= 2018 United States House of Representatives elections in Missouri =

- November 6, 2018

All eight of Missouri's seats to the United States House of Representatives
	Majority party	Minority party
Party	Republican	Democratic
Last election	6	2
Seats won	6	2
Seat change	Steady	Steady
Popular vote	1,330,975	1,027,969
Percentage	55.03%	42.51%
Swing	▼3.17%	▲4.65%

Republican
50–60%
60–70%
70–80%
80–90%
Democratic
50–60%
60–70%
80–90%

The 2018 United States House of Representatives elections in Missouri were held on November 6, 2018, to elect the eight U.S. representatives from the state of Missouri, one from each of the state's eight congressional districts.

== Results summary ==
=== Statewide ===
Party	Candidates	Votes		Seats		
Party	Candidates	No.	%	No.	+/–	%
Republican	8	1,330,975	55.04	6	Steady	75.00%
Democratic	8	1,027,969	42.51	2	Steady	25.00%
Libertarian	8	54,746	2.26	0	Steady	0.00%
Green	2	3,831	0.16	0	Steady	0.00%
Constitution	1	876	0.04	0	Steady	0.00%
Write-in	3	16	0.0	0	Steady	0.00%
Total	30	2,418,413	100.0	8	Steady	100.0%

Popular vote
Republican	55.03%
Democratic	42.51%
Libertarian	2.26%
Other	0.20%

House seats
Republican	75.00%
Democratic	25.00%

=== District ===
Results of the 2018 United States House of Representatives elections in Missouri by district:

District	Republican		Democratic		Others		Total		Result
District	Votes	%	Votes	%	Votes	%	Votes	%	Result
District 1	45,867	16.72%	219,781	80.10%	8,727	3.18%	274,375	100.0%	Democratic hold
District 2	192,477	51.18%	177,611	47.23%	5,978	1.59%	376,066	100.0%	Republican hold
District 3	211,243	65.08%	106,589	32.84%	6,776	2.08%	324,608	100.0%	Republican hold
District 4	190,138	64.82%	95,968	32.72%	7,210	2.46%	293,316	100.0%	Republican hold
District 5	101,069	35.69%	175,019	61.53%	7,697	2.78%	283,785	100.0%	Democratic hold
District 6	199,796	65.42%	97,660	31.98%	7,953	2.60%	305,409	100.0%	Republican hold
District 7	196,343	66.23%	89,190	30.09%	10,922	3.68%	296,455	100.0%	Republican hold
District 8	194,042	73.39%	66,151	25.02%	4,206	1.59%	264,399	100.0%	Republican hold
Total	1,330,975	55.03%	1,027,969	42.51%	59,469	2.46%	2,418,413	100.0%	

== District 1 ==
2018 Missouri's 1st congressional district election
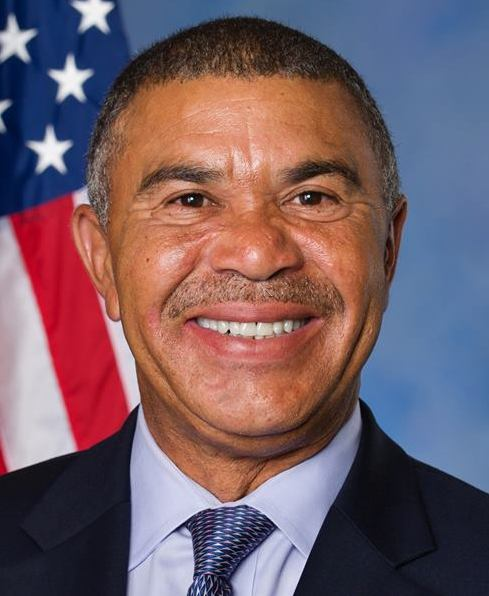

Nominee	Lacy Clay	Robert Vroman
Party	Democratic	Republican
Popular vote	219,781	45,867
Percentage	80.1%	16.7%
- Clay: 70–80% 80–90%
U.S. Representative before election
Lacy Clay
Democratic
Elected U.S. Representative
Lacy Clay
Democratic

The 1st district includes all of St. Louis City and much of Northern St. Louis County. Incumbent Democrat Lacy Clay, who had represented the district since 2001, ran for re-election. He was re-elected with 75% of the vote in 2016. The district had a PVI of D+29.

=== Democratic primary ===
==== Candidates ====
===== Nominee =====
- Lacy Clay, incumbent U.S. representative

===== Eliminated in primary =====
- Cori Bush, pastor, nurse and candidate for U.S. Senate in 2016
- Demarco Davidson
- Joshua Shipp, certified exercise physiologist

===== Withdrawn =====
- Susan Bolhafner

==== Endorsements ====
Cori Bush

State legislators

- Nina Turner, president of Our Revolution and former Ohio state senate

Organizations

- Brand New Congress
- Democracy for America
- Justice Democrats
- Our Revolution
- St. Louis Young Democrats

Individuals

- Alexandria Ocasio-Cortez, bartender, activist and nominee for New York's 14th district in 2018
Lacy Clay

Newspapers

- The St. Louis American

==== Primary results ====
Democratic primary results 50–60% Clay 60–70% Clay

Democratic primary results
Party	Candidate	Votes	%
Democratic	Lacy Clay (incumbent)	81,426	56.7
Democratic	Cori Bush	53,056	36.9
Democratic	Joshua Shipp	4,959	3.5
Democratic	DeMarco K. Davidson	4,229	2.9
Total votes		143,670	100.0

=== Republican primary ===
==== Candidates ====
===== Nominee =====
- Robert Vroman

===== Eliminated in primary =====
- Camille Lombardi-Olive
- Edward Van Deventer Jr.

==== Primary results ====
Republican primary results
Party	Candidate	Votes	%
Republican	Robert Vroman	5,095	34.5
Republican	Edward L. Van Deventer Jr.	4,864	32.9
Republican	Camille Lombardi-Olive	4,820	32.6
Total votes		14,779	100.0

=== Libertarian primary ===
==== Candidates ====
===== Nominee =====
- Robb Cunningham, nominee for this seat in 2008, 2012, 2014 and 2016 and candidate in 2010

==== Primary results ====
Libertarian primary results
Party	Candidate	Votes	%
Libertarian	Robb Cunningham	478	100.0
Total votes		478	100.0

=== General election ===
==== Predictions ====
Source	Ranking	As of
The Cook Political Report	Safe D	November 5, 2018
Inside Elections	Safe D	November 5, 2018
Sabato's Crystal Ball	Safe D	November 5, 2018
RCP	Safe D	November 5, 2018
Daily Kos	Safe D	November 5, 2018
538	Safe D	November 7, 2018
CNN	Safe D	October 31, 2018
Politico	Safe D	November 2, 2018

==== Results ====
Missouri's 1st congressional district, 2018
Party	Candidate	Votes	%
Democratic	Lacy Clay (incumbent)	219,781	80.1
Republican	Robert Vroman	45,867	16.7
Libertarian	Robb Cunningham	8,727	3.2
Total votes		274,375	100.0
Democratic hold			

== District 2 ==
2018 Missouri's 2nd congressional district election
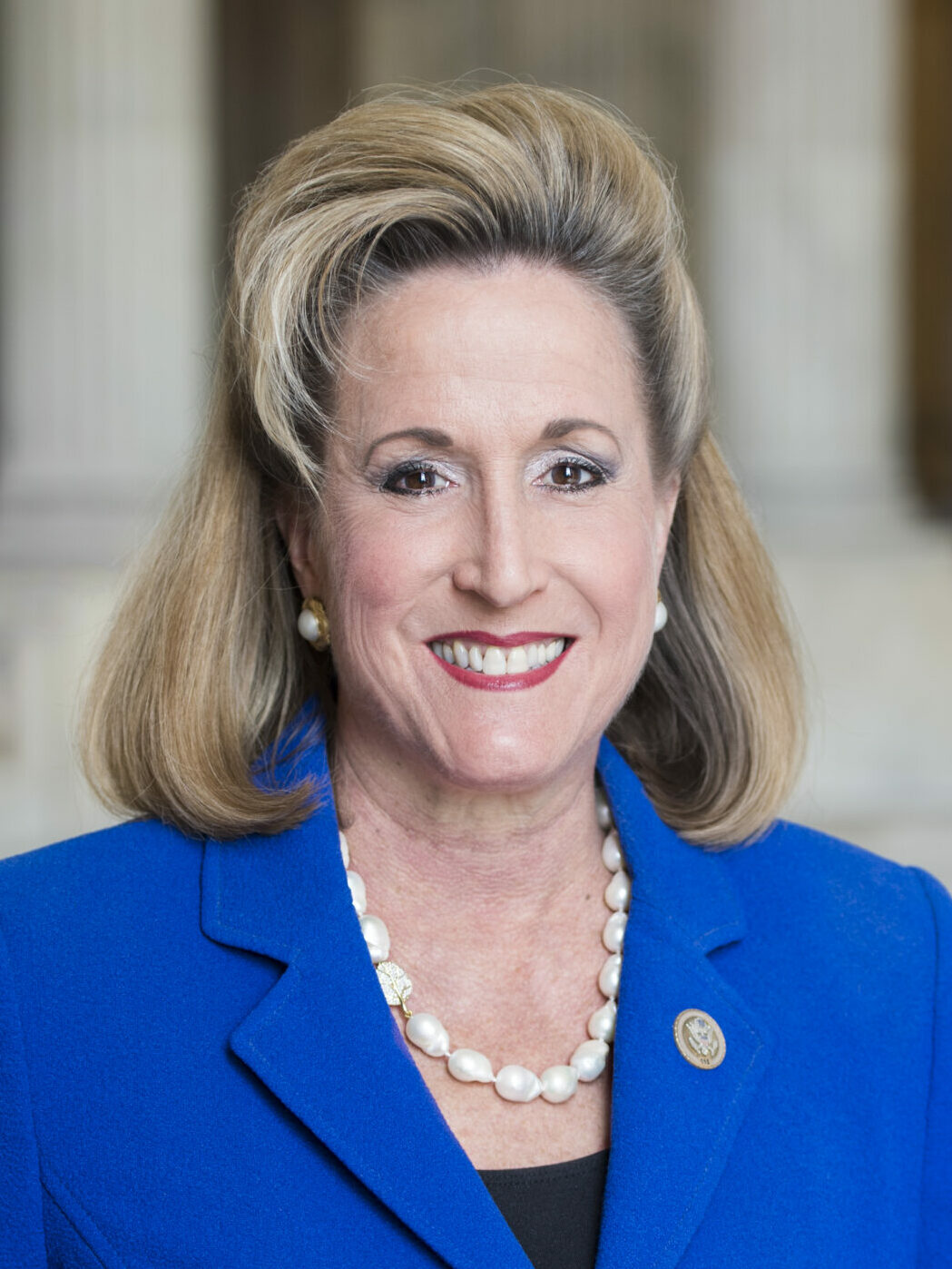

Nominee	Ann Wagner	Cort VanOstran
Party	Republican	Democratic
Popular vote	192,477	177,611
Percentage	51.2%	47.2%
- Wagner: 40–50% 50–60%
U.S. Representative before election
Ann Wagner
Republican
Elected U.S. Representative
Ann Wagner
Republican

The 2nd district includes the suburbs south and west of St. Louis City. Incumbent Republican Ann Wagner, who had represented the district since 2013, ran for re-election. She was re-elected with 59% of the vote in 2016. The district had a PVI of R+8.

=== Republican primary ===
Wagner was considered likely to run for the U.S. Senate in 2018 instead of running for re-election, but opted to seek re-election to the House.

At the filing deadline, one candidate, Noga Sachs, had filed with the Federal Election Commission to run in the Republican primary. Despite an attempt by the Missouri Republican Party to remove her from the ballot in April 2018, she remained on the ballot.

==== Candidates ====
===== Nominee =====
- Ann Wagner, incumbent U.S. representative

===== Eliminated in primary =====
- Noga Sachs, business owner

==== Primary results ====
Republican primary results
Party	Candidate	Votes	%
Republican	Ann Wagner (incumbent)	72,173	89.9
Republican	Noga Sachs	8,115	10.1
Total votes		80,288	100.0

=== Democratic primary ===
==== Candidates ====
===== Nominee =====
- Cort VanOstran, attorney, advocate and teacher

===== Eliminated in primary =====
- Bill Haas, St. Louis School Board member, candidate for mayor of St. Louis in 2017 and nominee for this seat in 2008
- Robert Hazel
- John Messmer, professor of political science at St. Louis Community College – Meramec
- Mark Osmack, former army officer and Afghanistan veteran

===== Withdrawn =====
- Kelli Dunaway, assistant director of legal professional development at Bryan Cave LLP and former elected delegate for the California Democratic Party
- Mike Evans, candidate for state house in 2016

===== Declined =====
- Sam Gladney, Iraq War veteran and stepson of former Republican representative Jo Ann Emerson

==== Endorsements ====
Cort VanOstran

Organizations

- St. Louis Young Democrats

==== Primary results ====
Democratic primary results
Party	Candidate	Votes	%
Democratic	Cort VanOstran	45,248	41.7
Democratic	Mark J. Osmack	27,389	25.2
Democratic	William "Bill" Haas	21,151	19.5
Democratic	John Messmer	10,503	9.7
Democratic	Robert W. Hazel	4,321	4.0
Total votes		108,612	100.0

=== Libertarian primary ===
==== Candidates ====
===== Nominee =====
- Larry Kirk

==== Primary results ====
Libertarian primary results
Party	Candidate	Votes	%
Libertarian	Larry Kirk	905	100.0
Total votes		905	100.0

=== Green primary ===
==== Candidates ====
===== Nominee =====
- David Justus Arnold

==== Primary results ====
Green primary results
Party	Candidate	Votes	%
Green	David Justus Arnold	177	100.0
Total votes		177	100.0

=== General election ===
==== Endorsements ====
Cort VanOstran (D)

Organizations

- Democratic Congressional Campaign Committee "Red to Blue" Program
- Everytown for Gun Safety

==== Polling ====
Poll source	Date(s) administered	Sample size	Margin of error	Ann Wagner (R)	Cort VanOstran (D)	Tony Kirk (L)	David Arnold (G)	Undecided
Expedition Strategies (D-VanOstran)	August 23–26, 2018	402	± 4.9%	41%	43%	1%	0%	14%
Remington Research (R)	August 22–23, 2018	983	± 3.1%	51%	40%	–	–	9%

==== Predictions ====
Source	Ranking	As of
The Cook Political Report	Lean R	November 5, 2018
Inside Elections	Safe R	November 5, 2018
Sabato's Crystal Ball	Likely R	November 5, 2018
RCP	Likely R	November 5, 2018
Daily Kos	Likely R	November 5, 2018
538	Likely R	November 7, 2018
CNN	Likely R	October 31, 2018
Politico	Likely R	November 4, 2018

==== Results ====
Missouri's 2nd congressional district, 2018
Party	Candidate	Votes	%
Republican	Ann Wagner (incumbent)	192,477	51.2
Democratic	Cort VanOstran	177,611	47.2
Libertarian	Tony Kirk	4,229	1.1
Green	David Arnold	1,740	0.5
Write-in		9	0.0
Total votes		376,066	100.0
Republican hold			

== District 3 ==
2018 Missouri's 3rd congressional district election
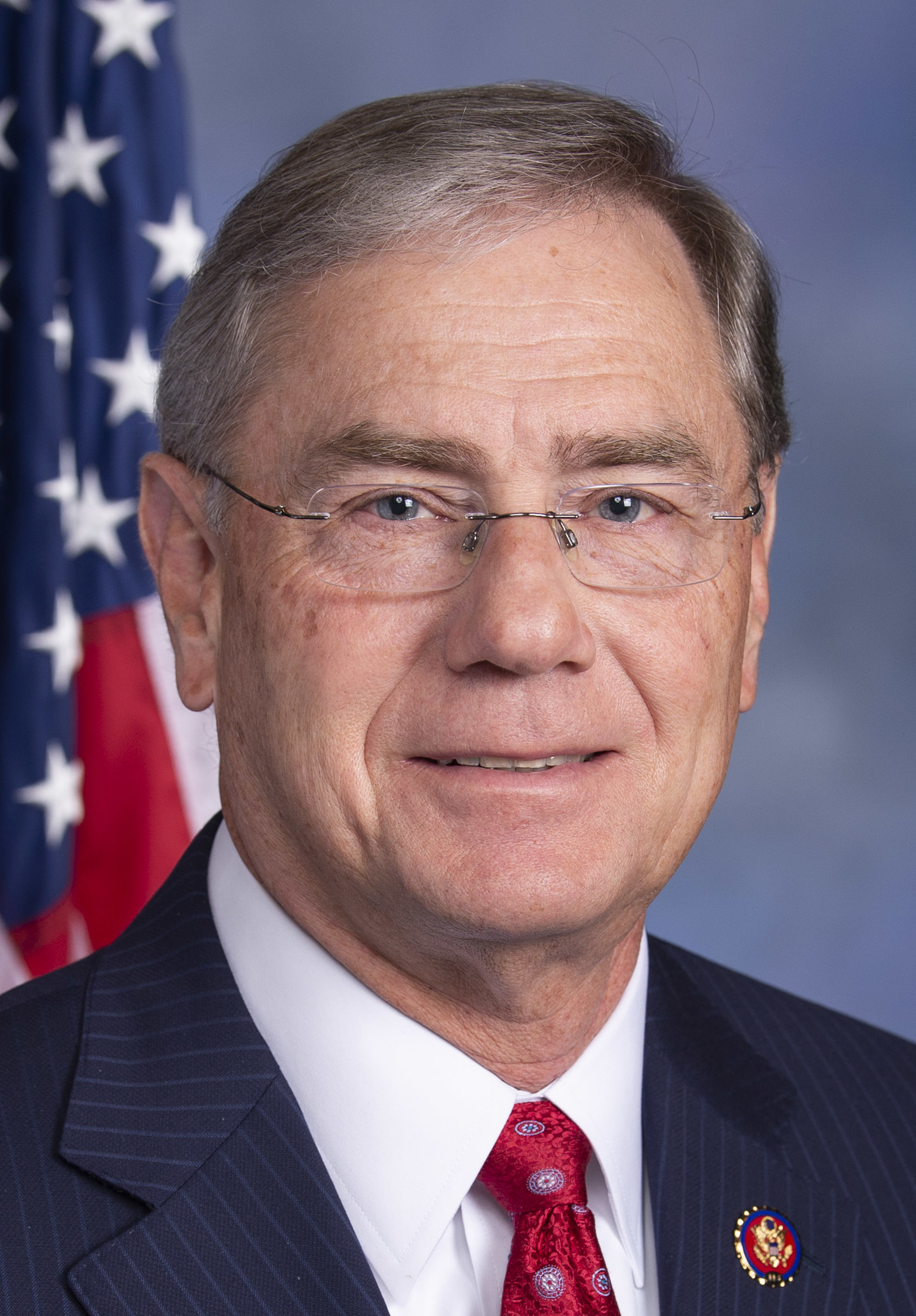

Nominee	Blaine Luetkemeyer	Katy Geppert
Party	Republican	Democratic
Popular vote	211,243	106,589
Percentage	65.1%	32.8%
- Luetkemeyer: 50–60% 60–70% 70–80% 80–90%
U.S. Representative before election
Blaine Luetkemeyer
Republican
Elected U.S. Representative
Blaine Luetkemeyer
Republican

The third district stretches from exurbs of St. Louis to the state capital Jefferson City. Incumbent Republican Blaine Luetkemeyer, who had represented the district since 2009, ran for re-election. He was re-elected with 68% of the vote in 2016. The district had a PVI of R+18.

=== Republican primary ===
==== Candidates ====
===== Nominee =====
- Blaine Luetkemeyer, incumbent U.S. representative

===== Eliminated in primary =====
- Chadwick Bicknell

==== Primary results ====
Republican primary results
Party	Candidate	Votes	%
Republican	Blaine Luetkemeyer (incumbent)	95,385	79.9
Republican	Chadwick Bicknell	24,000	20.1
Total votes		119,385	100.0

=== Democratic primary ===
==== Candidates ====
===== Nominee =====
- Katy Geppert, scientist

===== Withdrawn =====
- John Kiehne, musician

==== Endorsements ====
Katy Geppert

Organizations

- St. Louis Young Democrats

==== Primary results ====
Democratic primary results
Party	Candidate	Votes	%
Democratic	Katy Geppert	55,815	100.0
Total votes		55,815	100.0

=== Libertarian primary ===
==== Candidates ====
===== Nominee =====
- Donald Stolle

==== Primary results ====
Libertarian primary results
Party	Candidate	Votes	%
Libertarian	Donald Stolle	745	100.0
Total votes		745	100.0

=== General election ===
==== Predictions ====
Source	Ranking	As of
The Cook Political Report	Safe R	November 5, 2018
Inside Elections	Safe R	November 5, 2018
Sabato's Crystal Ball	Safe R	November 5, 2018
RCP	Safe R	November 5, 2018
Daily Kos	Safe R	November 5, 2018
538	Safe R	November 7, 2018
CNN	Safe R	October 31, 2018
Politico	Safe R	November 4, 2018

==== Results ====
Missouri's 3rd congressional district, 2018
Party	Candidate	Votes	%
Republican	Blaine Luetkemeyer (incumbent)	211,243	65.1
Democratic	Katy Geppert	106,589	32.8
Libertarian	Donald Stolle	6,776	2.1
Total votes		324,608	100.0
Republican hold			

== District 4 ==
2018 Missouri's 4th congressional district election
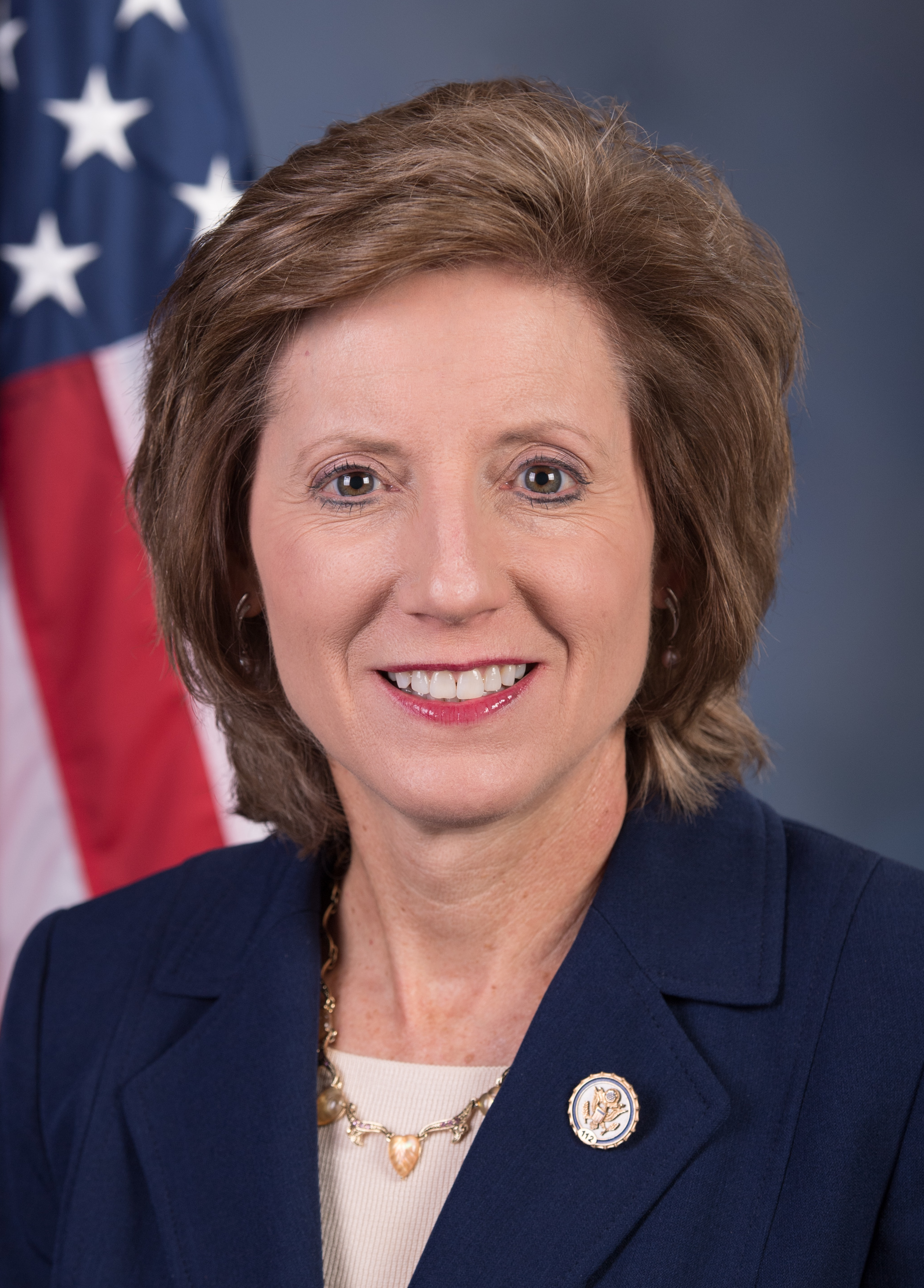

Nominee	Vicky Hartzler	Renee Hoagenson
Party	Republican	Democratic
Popular vote	190,138	95,968
Percentage	64.8%	32.7%
- Hartzler: 60–70% 70–80% 80–90% Hoagenson: 50–60%
U.S. Representative before election
Vicky Hartzler
Republican
Elected U.S. Representative
Vicky Hartzler
Republican

The fourth district comprises the city of Columbia and much of rural west-central Missouri. Incumbent Republican Vicky Hartzler, who had represented the district since 2011, ran for re-election. She was re-elected with 68% of the vote in 2016. The district had a PVI of R+17.

=== Republican primary ===
Hartzler had been considered a potential candidate for the U.S. Senate in 2018.

==== Candidates ====
===== Nominee =====
- Vicky Hartzler, incumbent U.S. representative

===== Eliminated in primary =====
- John Webb, small business owner

===== Withdrawn =====
- Jenna Marie Bourgeois, CEO of a global technology startup

==== Primary results ====
Republican primary results
Party	Candidate	Votes	%
Republican	Vicky Hartzler (incumbent)	74,226	73.5
Republican	John Webb	26,787	26.5
Total votes		101,013	100

=== Democratic primary ===
==== Candidates ====
===== Nominee =====
- Renee Hoagenson, business owner

===== Eliminated in primary =====
- Hallie Thompson, scientist

==== Primary results ====
Democratic primary results
Party	Candidate	Votes	%
Democratic	Renee Hoagenson	24,139	51.9
Democratic	Hallie J. Thompson	22,398	48.1
Total votes		46,537	100

=== Libertarian primary ===
==== Candidates ====
===== Nominee =====
- Mark Bliss, co-pastor of a Warrensburg church group and nominee for this seat in 2016

===== Eliminated in primary =====
- Steven Koonse, financial examiner, Vietnam War veteran and Bronze Star recipient

==== Primary results ====
Libertarian primary results
Party	Candidate	Votes	%
Libertarian	Mark Bliss	398	56.1
Libertarian	Steven Koonse	312	43.9
Total votes		710	100.0

=== General election ===
==== Predictions ====
Source	Ranking	As of
The Cook Political Report	Safe R	November 5, 2018
Inside Elections	Safe R	November 5, 2018
Sabato's Crystal Ball	Safe R	November 5, 2018
RCP	Safe R	November 5, 2018
Daily Kos	Safe R	November 5, 2018
538	Safe R	November 7, 2018
CNN	Safe R	October 31, 2018
Politico	Safe R	November 4, 2018

==== Endorsements ====
Renee Hoagenson (D)

Statewide officials

- Jason Kander, former Secretary of State of Missouri and nominee for U.S Senate in 2016
- Roger B. Wilson, former governor of Missouri and former chair of the Missouri Democratic Party

Labor unions

- Fire Fighters Local 42
- International Association of Machinists and Aerospace Workers
- North America's Building Trades Unions
- St. Louis–Kansas City Carpenters Regional Council

Organizations

- National Women's Political Caucus

==== Results ====
Missouri's 4th congressional district, 2018
Party	Candidate	Votes	%
Republican	Vicky Hartzler (incumbent)	190,138	64.8
Democratic	Renee Hoagenson	95,968	32.7
Libertarian	Mark Bliss	7,210	2.5
Total votes		293,316	100.0
Republican hold			

== District 5 ==
2018 Missouri's 5th congressional district election
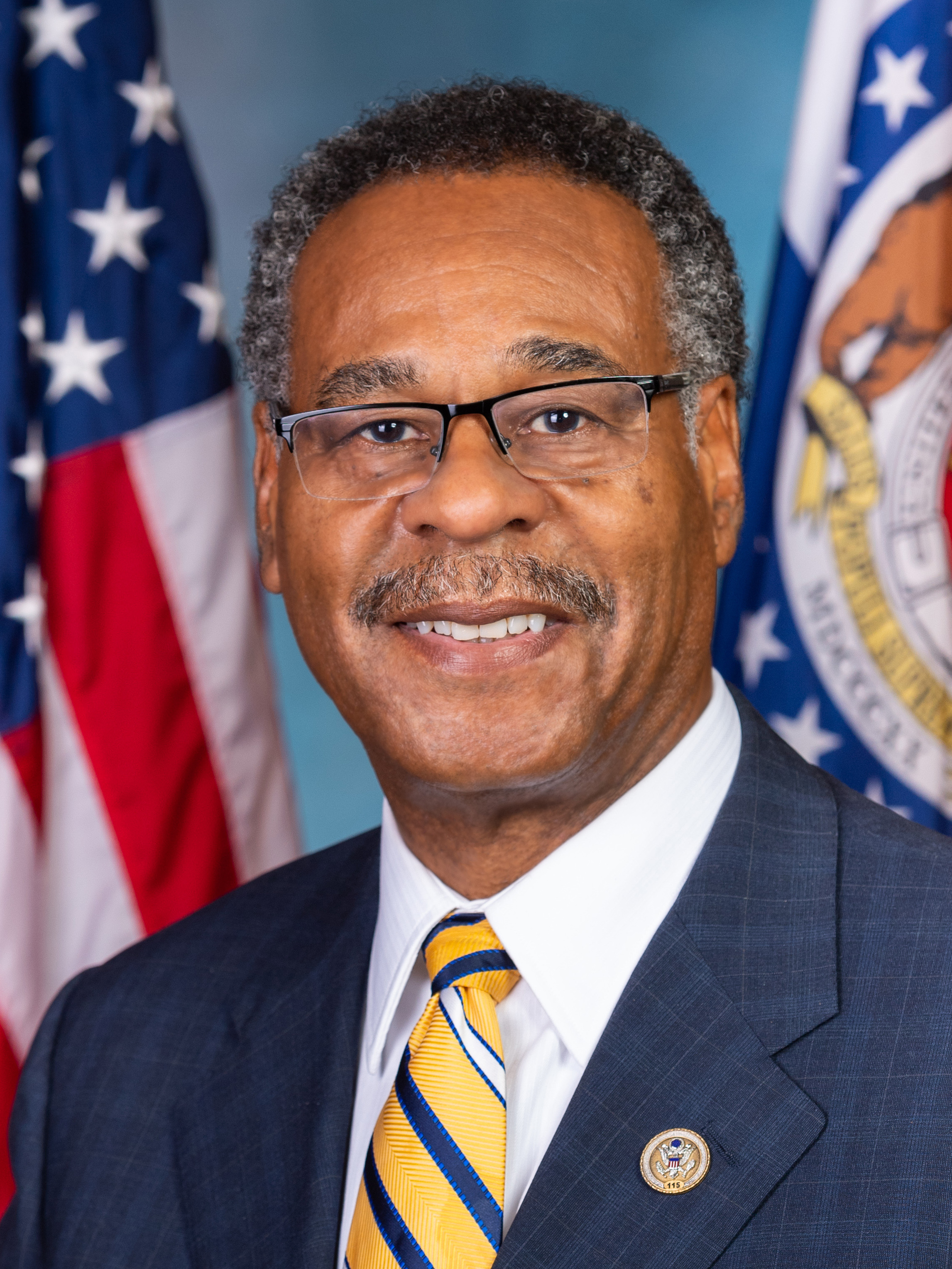

Nominee	Emanuel Cleaver	Jacob Turk
Party	Democratic	Republican
Popular vote	175,019	101,069
Percentage	61.7%	35.6%
- Cleaver: 50–60% 60–70% Turk: 50–60% 60–70%
U.S. Representative before election
Emanuel Cleaver
Democratic
Elected U.S. Representative
Emanuel Cleaver
Democratic

The fifth district encompasses most of Jackson County, the southern part of Clay County, and three other rural counties to the east. Incumbent Democrat Emanuel Cleaver, who had represented the district since 2005, ran for re-election. He was re-elected with 58% of the vote in 2016. The district had a PVI of D+7.

=== Democratic primary ===
==== Candidates ====
===== Nominee =====
- Emanuel Cleaver, incumbent U.S. representative

===== Withdrawn =====
- Jenna Squires

==== Primary results ====
Democratic primary results
Party	Candidate	Votes	%
Democratic	Emanuel Cleaver (incumbent)	87,449	100.0
Total votes		87,449	100.0

=== Republican primary ===
==== Candidates ====
===== Nominee =====
- Jacob Turk, Marine Corps veteran and nominee for this seat in 2006 and 2008, 2010, 2012, 2014 & 2016

===== Eliminated in primary =====
- Kress Cambers
- Richonda Oaks

===== Withdrawn =====
- Brent Lasater, state representative

==== Primary results ====
Republican primary results
Party	Candidate	Votes	%
Republican	Jacob Turk	35,883	75.1
Republican	Kress Cambers	8,423	17.6
Republican	Richonda Oaks	3,467	7.3
Total votes		47,773	100.0

=== Libertarian primary ===
==== Candidates ====
===== Nominee =====
- Alexander Howell, realtor

===== Eliminated in primary =====
- Cisse Spragins, director of a rodent control product manufacturer, former Missouri Libertarian Party chair, candidate for the U.S. Senate in 2010, nominee for Missouri Secretary of State in 2012 and for governor in 2016

==== Primary results ====
Libertarian primary results
Party	Candidate	Votes	%
Libertarian	Alexander Howell	512	56.3
Libertarian	Cisse Spragins	398	43.7
Total votes		910	100.0

=== Green primary ===
==== Candidates ====
===== Nominee =====
- Maurice Copeland

==== Primary results ====
Green primary results
Party	Candidate	Votes	%
Green	Maurice Copeland	315	100.0
Total votes		315	100.0

=== Constitution primary ===
==== Candidates ====
===== Nominee =====
- E. C. Fredland

=== General election ===
==== Predictions ====
Source	Ranking	As of
The Cook Political Report	Safe D	November 5, 2018
Inside Elections	Safe D	November 5, 2018
Sabato's Crystal Ball	Safe D	November 5, 2018
RCP	Safe D	November 5, 2018
Daily Kos	Safe D	November 5, 2018
538	Safe D	November 7, 2018
CNN	Safe D	October 31, 2018
Politico	Safe D	November 4, 2018

==== Results ====
Missouri's 5th congressional district, 2018
Party	Candidate	Votes	%
Democratic	Emanuel Cleaver (incumbent)	175,019	61.7
Republican	Jacob Turk	101,069	35.6
Libertarian	Alexander Howell	4,725	1.7
Green	Maurice Copeland	2,091	0.7
Constitution	E.C. Fredland	876	0.3
Write-in		5	0.0
Total votes		283,785	100.0
Democratic hold			

== District 6 ==
2018 Missouri's 6th congressional district election
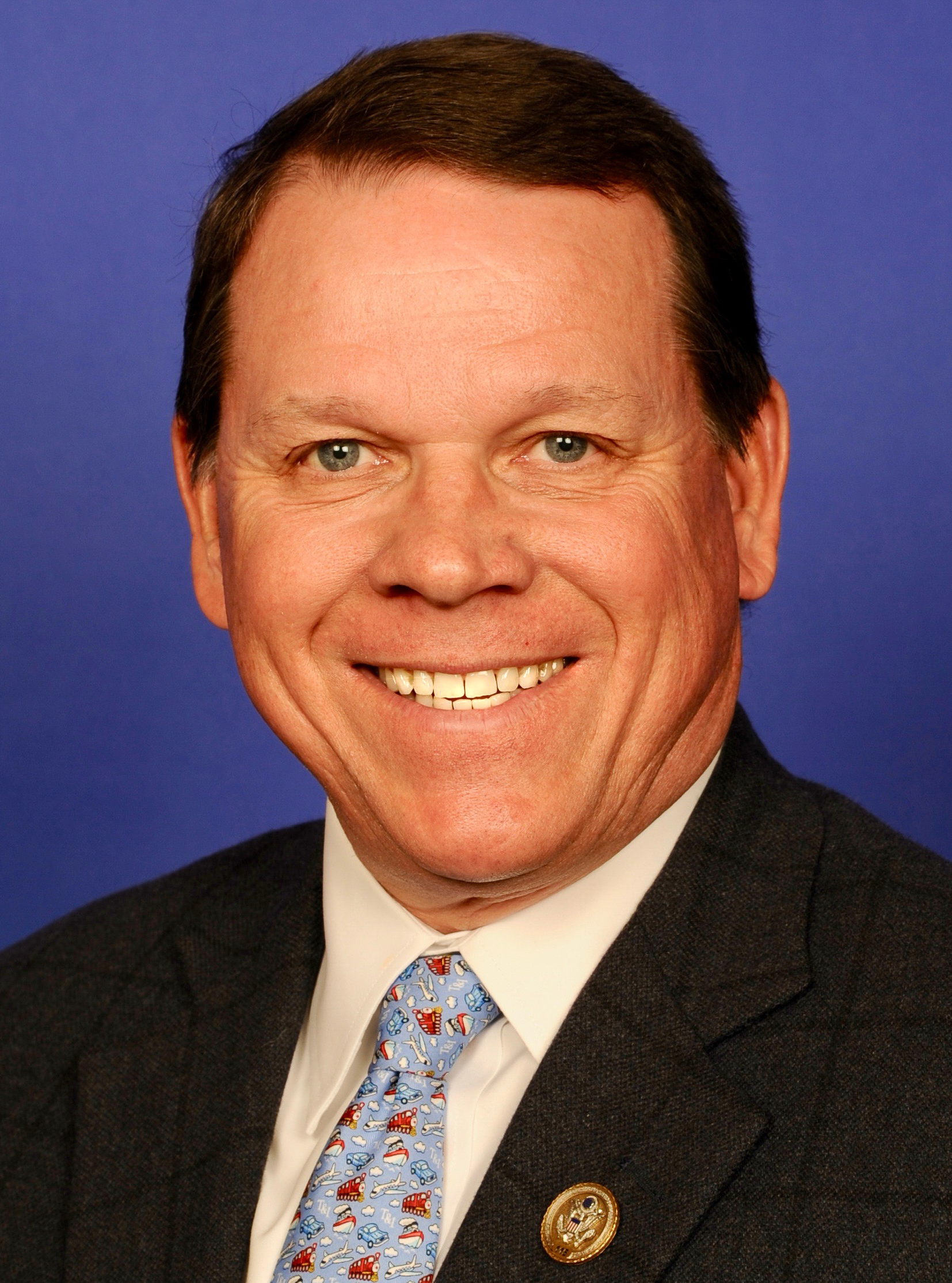

Nominee	Sam Graves	Henry Martin
Party	Republican	Democratic
Popular vote	199,796	97,660
Percentage	65.4%	32.0%
- Graves: 50–60% 60–70% 70–80% 80–90%
U.S. Representative before election
Sam Graves
Republican
Elected U.S. Representative
Sam Graves
Republican

The sixth district encompasses rural northern Missouri, St. Joseph and much of Kansas City north of the Missouri River. Incumbent Republican Sam Graves, who had represented the district since 2001, ran for re-election. He was re-elected with 68% of the vote in 2016. The district had a PVI of R+16.

=== Republican primary ===
==== Candidates ====
===== Nominee =====
- Sam Graves, incumbent U.S. representative

==== Primary results ====
Republican primary results
Party	Candidate	Votes	%
Republican	Sam Graves (incumbent)	89,595	100.0
Total votes		89,595	100.0

=== Democratic primary ===
==== Candidates ====
===== Nominee =====
- Henry Martin, educator and army veteran

===== Eliminated in primary =====
- Ed Andres
- Winston Apple, musician, educator and candidate for state house in 2014

==== Primary results ====
Democratic primary results
Party	Candidate	Votes	%
Democratic	Henry Robert Martin	21,677	41.5
Democratic	Winston Apple	16,087	30.8
Democratic	Ed Andres	14,453	27.7
Total votes		52,217	100.0

=== Libertarian primary ===
==== Candidates ====
===== Nominee =====
- Dan Hogan, nominee for the 3rd district in 2016

==== Primary results ====
Libertarian primary results
Party	Candidate	Votes	%
Libertarian	Dan Hogan	590	100.0
Total votes		590	100.0

=== General election ===
==== Predictions ====
Source	Ranking	As of
The Cook Political Report	Safe R	November 5, 2018
Inside Elections	Safe R	November 5, 2018
Sabato's Crystal Ball	Safe R	November 5, 2018
RCP	Safe R	November 5, 2018
Daily Kos	Safe R	November 5, 2018
538	Safe R	November 7, 2018
CNN	Safe R	October 31, 2018
Politico	Safe R	November 4, 2018

==== Results ====
Missouri's 6th congressional district, 2018
Party	Candidate	Votes	%
Republican	Sam Graves (incumbent)	199,796	65.4
Democratic	Henry Martin	97,660	32.0
Libertarian	Dan Hogan	7,953	2.6
Total votes		305,409	100.0
Republican hold			

== District 7 ==
2018 Missouri's 7th congressional district election
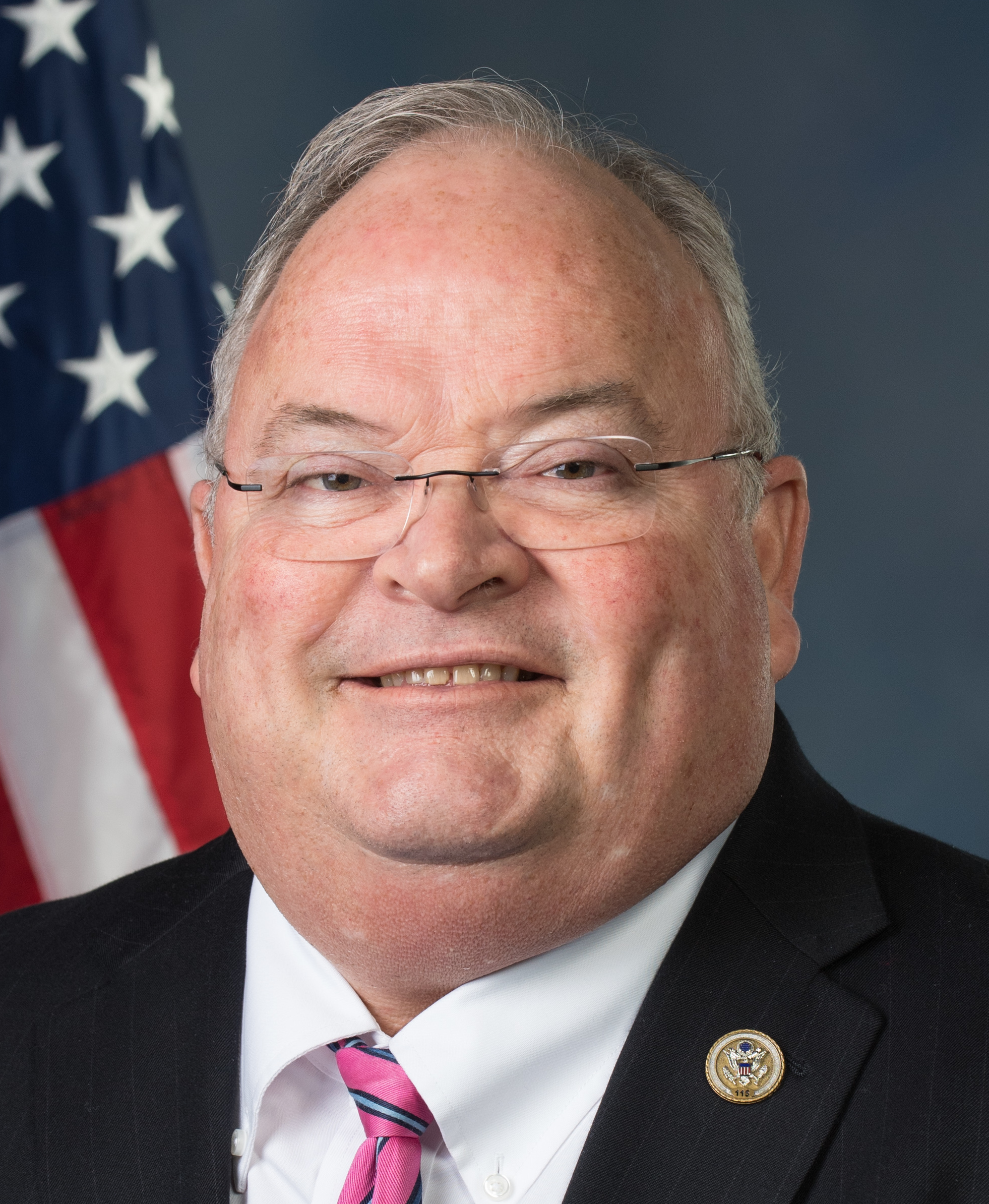

Nominee	Billy Long	Jamie Schoolcraft
Party	Republican	Democratic
Popular vote	196,343	89,190
Percentage	66.2%	30.1%
U.S. Representative before election
Billy Long
Republican
Elected U.S. Representative
Billy Long
Republican

The seventh district takes in Springfield, Joplin, and much of the rest of rural southwestern Missouri. Incumbent Republican Billy Long, who had represented the district since 2011, ran for re-election. He was re-elected with 68% of the vote in 20`6. The district had a PVI of R+23.

=== Republican primary ===
Long had been considered a potential candidate for the U.S. Senate in 2018.

==== Candidates ====
===== Nominee =====
- Billy Long, incumbent U.S. representative

===== Eliminated in primary =====
- Jim Evans, retired businessman, teacher, U.S. Army veteran and Democratic nominee for this seat in 2012 & 2014
- Benjamin Holcomb
- Lance Norris

==== Primary results ====
Republican primary results
Party	Candidate	Votes	%
Republican	Billy Long (incumbent)	68,438	65.1
Republican	Jim Evans	18,383	17.5
Republican	Lance Norris	10,884	10.4
Republican	Benjamin Holcomb	7,416	7.1
Total votes		105,121	100.0

=== Democratic primary ===
==== Candidates ====
===== Nominee =====
- Jamie Schoolcraft, former mayor of Willard

===== Eliminated in primary =====
- John Farmer de la Torre, television producer
- Kenneth Hatfield
- Vincent Jennings, former cult exit counselor, filmmaker, candidate for state house in 1996 and nominee in 2014

===== Withdrawn =====
- Natalie Faucett

==== Endorsements ====
Jamie Schoolcraft

U.S. representatives

- Russ Carnahan, former U.S. representative for Missouri's 3rd congressional district

Organizations

- Justice Democrats

==== Primary results ====
Democratic primary results
Party	Candidate	Votes	%
Democratic	Jamie Daniel Schoolcraft	12,499	40.6
Democratic	Kenneth Hatfield	6,854	22.3
Democratic	John Farmer de la Torre	6,685	21.7
Democratic	Vince Jennings	4,738	15.4
Total votes		30,776	100.0

=== Libertarian primary ===
==== Candidates ====
===== Nominee =====
- Ben Brixey, Secretary of the Greene County Libertarian Party and nominee for this seat in 2016

==== Primary results ====
Libertarian primary results
Party	Candidate	Votes	%
Libertarian	Benjamin Brixey	697	100.0
Total votes		697	100.0

=== General election ===
==== Predictions ====
Source	Ranking	As of
The Cook Political Report	Safe R	November 5, 2018
Inside Elections	Safe R	November 5, 2018
Sabato's Crystal Ball	Safe R	November 5, 2018
RCP	Safe R	November 5, 2018
Daily Kos	Safe R	November 5, 2018
538	Safe R	November 7, 2018
CNN	Safe R	October 31, 2018
Politico	Safe R	November 4, 2018

==== Results ====
Missouri's 7th congressional district, 2018
Party	Candidate	Votes	%
Republican	Billy Long (incumbent)	196,343	66.2
Democratic	Jamie Schoolcraft	89,190	30.1
Libertarian	Ben Brixey	10,920	3.7
Write-in		2	0.0
Total votes		296,455	100.0
Republican hold			

== District 8 ==
2018 Missouri's 8th congressional district election
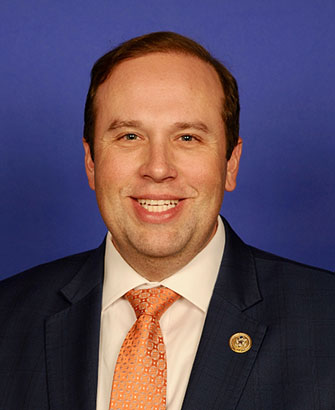

Nominee	Jason Smith	Kathy Ellis
Party	Republican	Democratic
Popular vote	194,042	66,151
Percentage	73.4%	25.0%
- Smith: 50–60% 60–70% 70–80% 80–90%
U.S. Representative before election
Jason Smith
Republican
Elected U.S. Representative
Jason Smith
Republican

The eighth district is the most rural district of Missouri, taking in all of the rural southeastern and south-central part of the state. It had a PVI of R+24, the most strongly Republican district of Missouri. Incumbent Republican Jason Smith, who had represented the district since 2013, ran for re-election. He was re-elected with 74% of the vote in 2016. The district had a PVI of R+24.

=== Republican primary ===
==== Candidates ====
===== Nominee =====
- Jason Smith, incumbent U.S. representative

==== Primary results ====
Republican primary results
Party	Candidate	Votes	%
Republican	Jason Smith (incumbent)	91,809	100.0
Total votes		91,809	100.0

=== Democratic primary ===
==== Candidates ====
===== Nominee =====
- Kathryn Ellis, social worker

==== Primary results ====
Democratic primary results
Party	Candidate	Votes	%
Democratic	Kathryn Ellis	33,799	100.0
Total votes		33,799	100.0

=== Libertarian primary ===
==== Candidates ====
===== Nominee =====
- Jonathan Shell, nominee for this seat in 2016

==== Primary results ====
Libertarian primary results
Party	Candidate	Votes	%
Libertarian	Jonathan Shell	361	100.0
Total votes		361	100.0

=== General election ===
==== Predictions ====
Source	Ranking	As of
The Cook Political Report	Safe R	November 5, 2018
Inside Elections	Safe R	November 5, 2018
Sabato's Crystal Ball	Safe R	November 5, 2018
RCP	Safe R	November 5, 2018
Daily Kos	Safe R	November 5, 2018
538	Safe R	November 7, 2018
CNN	Safe R	October 31, 2018
Politico	Safe R	November 4, 2018

==== Results ====
Missouri's 8th congressional district, 2018
Party	Candidate	Votes	%
Republican	Jason Smith (incumbent)	194,042	73.4
Democratic	Kathy Ellis	66,151	25.0
Libertarian	Jonathan Shell	4,206	1.6
Total votes		264,399	100.0
Republican hold			
