= 2016 United States House of Representatives elections in Missouri =

- November 8, 2016

All eight of Missouri's seats to the United States House of Representatives
	Majority party	Minority party
Party	Republican	Democratic
Last election	6	2
Seats won	6	2
Seat change	Steady	Steady
Popular vote	1,600,524	1,041,306
Percentage	58.20%	37.86%
Swing	▼0.57%	▲1.85%

Republican
40–50%
50–60%
60–70%
70–80%
80–90%
Democratic
50–60%
70–80%

The 2016 United States House of Representatives elections in Missouri were held on November 8, 2016, to elect the eight U.S. representatives from the state of Missouri, one from each of the state's eight congressional districts. The elections coincided with the 2016 U.S. presidential election, as well as other elections to the House of Representatives, elections to the United States Senate and various state and local elections. The primaries were held on August 2.

== Overview ==
United States House of Representatives elections in Missouri, 2016
Party	Votes	Percentage	Seats Before	Seats After	+/–
Republican	1,600,524	58.20%	6	6	Steady
Democratic	1,041,306	37.86%	2	2	Steady
Libertarian	96,492	3.51%	0	0	Steady
Green	8,136	0.30%	0	0	Steady
Constitution	3,605	0.13%	0	0	Steady
Write-ins	16	<0.01%	0	0	Steady
Totals	2,750,079	100.00%	8	8	0

=== District ===
Results of the 2014 United States House of Representatives elections in Missouri by district:

District	Republican		Democratic		Others		Total		Result
District	Votes	%	Votes	%	Votes	%	Votes	%	Result
District 1	62,714	19.97%	236,993	75.47%	14,317	4.56%	314,024	100.0%	Democratic hold
District 2	241,954	58.54%	155,689	37.67%	15,653	3.79%	413,296	100.0%	Republican hold
District 3	249,865	67.84%	102,891	27.93%	15,577	4.23%	368,333	100.0%	Republican hold
District 4	225,348	67.83%	92,510	27.84%	14,376	4.33%	332,234	100.0%	Republican hold
District 5	123,771	38.17%	190,766	58.83%	9,733	3.00%	324,270	100.0%	Democratic hold
District 6	238,388	68.02%	99,692	28.45%	12,364	3.53%	350,444	100.0%	Republican hold
District 7	228,692	67.54%	92,756	27.39%	17,159	5.07%	338,607	100.0%	Republican hold
District 8	229,792	74.40%	70,009	22.67%	9,070	2.94%	308,871	100.0%	Republican hold
Total	1,600,524	58.20%	1,041,306	37.86%	108,249	3.94%	2,750,079	100.0%	

== District 1 ==
2016 Missouri's 1st congressional district election
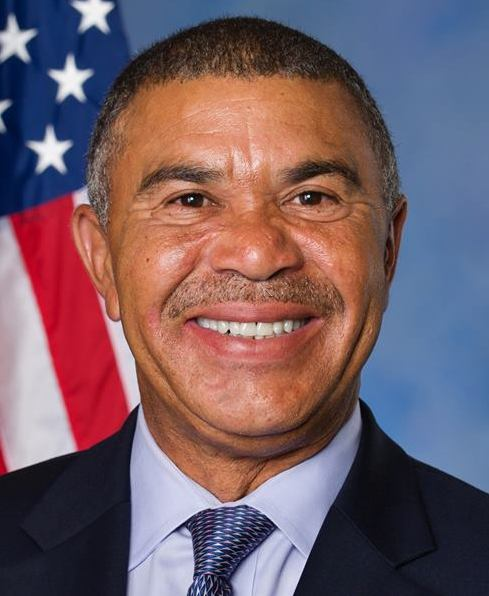

Nominee	Lacy Clay	Steven Bailey
Party	Democratic	Republican
Popular vote	236,993	62,714
Percentage	75.5%	20.0%
- Clay: 70–80%
U.S. Representative before election
Lacy Clay
Democratic
Elected U.S. Representative
Lacy Clay
Democratic

The 1st district includes all of St. Louis City and much of Northern St. Louis County, and it had a PVI of D+28. Incumbent Democrat Lacy Clay, who had represented the district since 2001, ran for re-election. He was re-elected with 73% of the vote in 2014.

=== Democratic primary ===
==== Candidates ====
===== Nominee =====
- Lacy Clay, incumbent U.S. Representative

===== Eliminated in primary =====
- Maria Chappelle-Nadal, state senator
- Bill Haas, perennial candidate

==== Results ====
Democratic primary results
Party	Candidate	Votes	%
Democratic	Lacy Clay (incumbent)	56,139	62.6
Democratic	Maria Chappelle-Nadal	24,059	26.9
Democratic	Bill Haas	9,422	10.5
Total votes		89,620	100.0

=== Republican primary ===
==== Candidates ====
===== Nominee =====
- Steven G. Bailey

===== Eliminated in primary =====
- Paul Berry III, community activist

==== Results ====
Republican primary results
Party	Candidate	Votes	%
Republican	Steven G. Bailey	12,450	67.2
Republican	Paul Berry III	6,067	32.8
Total votes		18,517	100.0

=== Libertarian primary ===
==== Candidates ====
===== Nominee =====
- Robb Cunningham

==== Results ====
Libertarian primary results
Party	Candidate	Votes	%
Libertarian	Robb E. Cunningham	367	100.0
Total votes		367	100.0

=== General election ===
==== Predictions ====
Source	Ranking	As of
The Cook Political Report	Safe D	November 7, 2016
Daily Kos Elections	Safe D	November 7, 2016
Rothenberg	Safe D	November 3, 2016
Sabato's Crystal Ball	Safe D	November 7, 2016
RCP	Safe D	October 31, 2016

==== Results ====
Missouri’s 1st congressional district, 2016
Party	Candidate	Votes	%
Democratic	Lacy Clay (incumbent)	236,993	75.5
Republican	Steven Bailey	62,714	20.0
Libertarian	Robb Cunningham	14,317	4.5
Total votes		314,024	100.0
Democratic hold			

== District 2 ==
2016 Missouri's 2nd congressional district election
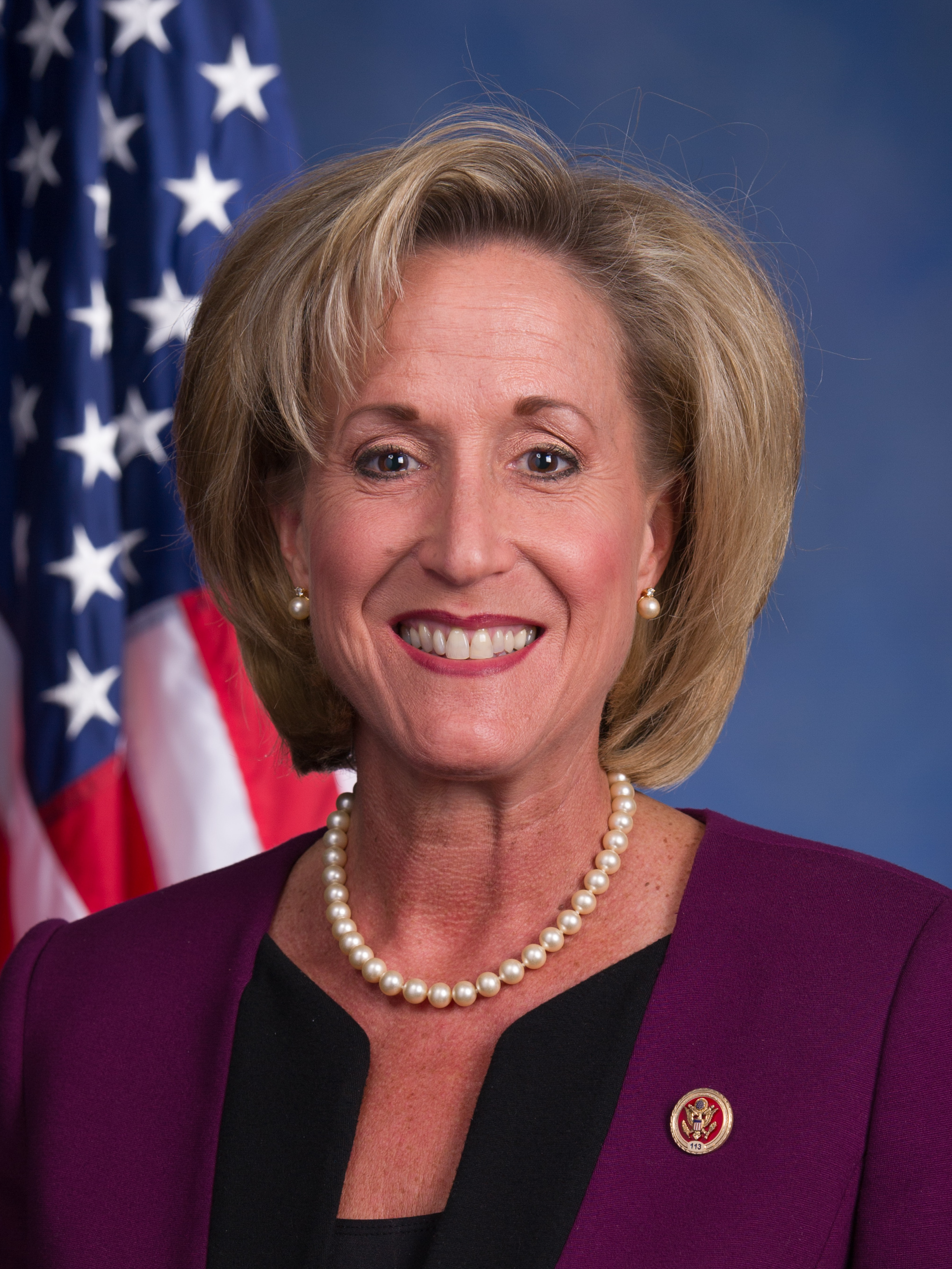

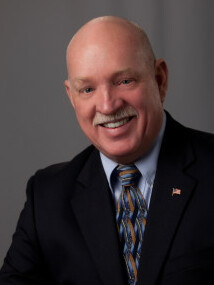
Nominee	Ann Wagner	Bill Otto
Party	Republican	Democratic
Popular vote	241,954	155,689
Percentage	58.5%	37.7%
- Wagner: 50–60% 60–70%
U.S. Representative before election
Ann Wagner
Republican
Elected U.S. Representative
Ann Wagner
Republican

The 2nd district includes the suburbs south and west of St. Louis City. Incumbent Republican Ann Wagner, who has represented the district since 2013, ran for re-election. She was re-elected with 64% of the vote in 2014 and the district had a PVI of R+8.

=== Republican primary ===
==== Candidates ====
===== Nominee =====
- Ann Wagner, incumbent U.S. Representative

===== Eliminated in primary =====
- Greg Sears

==== Results ====
Republican primary results
Party	Candidate	Votes	%
Republican	Ann Wagner (incumbent)	77,084	82.6
Republican	Greg Sears	16,263	17.4
Total votes		93,347	100.0

=== Democratic primary ===
==== Candidates ====
===== Nominee =====
- Bill Otto, state representative

===== Declined =====
- Arthur Lieber, educator and nominee for this seat in 2010 and 2014

==== Results ====
Democratic primary results
Party	Candidate	Votes	%
Democratic	Bill Otto	40,379	100.0
Total votes		40,379	100.0

=== Libertarian primary ===
==== Candidates ====
===== Nominee =====
- Jim Higgins

==== Results ====
Libertarian primary results
Party	Candidate	Votes	%
Libertarian	Jim Higgins	553	100.0
Total votes		367	100.0

=== Green Party ===
==== Candidates ====
===== Nominee =====
- David Arnold

=== General election ===
==== Predictions ====
Source	Ranking	As of
The Cook Political Report	Safe R	November 7, 2016
Daily Kos Elections	Safe R	November 7, 2016
Rothenberg	Safe R	November 3, 2016
Sabato's Crystal Ball	Safe R	November 7, 2016
RCP	Safe R	October 31, 2016

==== Results ====
Missouri’s 2nd congressional district, 2016
Party	Candidate	Votes	%
Republican	Ann Wagner (incumbent)	241,954	58.5
Democratic	Bill Otto	155,689	37.7
Libertarian	Jim Higgins	11,758	2.9
Green	David Justus Arnold	3,895	0.9
Total votes		413,296	100.0
Republican hold			

== District 3 ==
2016 Missouri's 3rd congressional district election
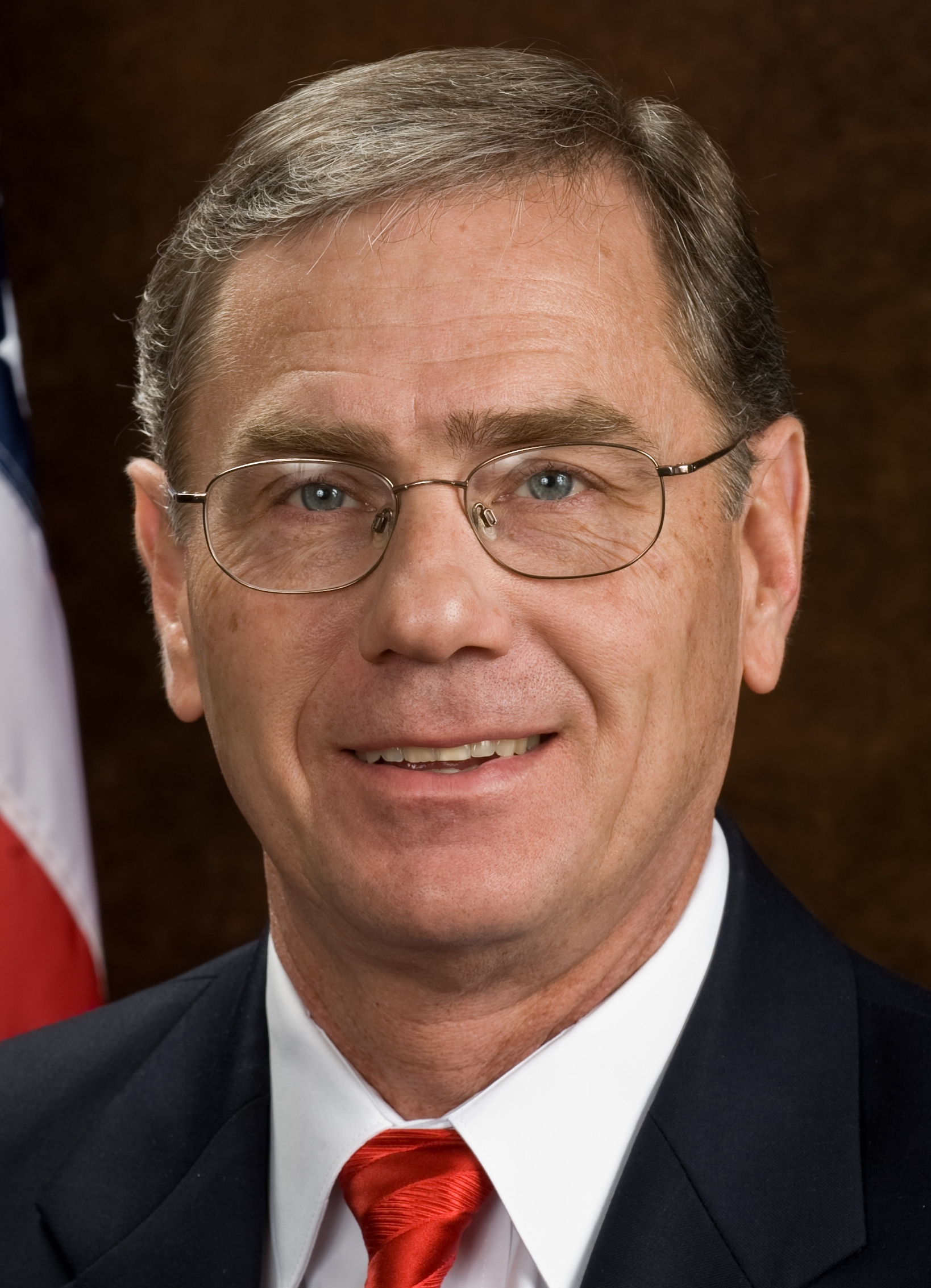

Nominee	Blaine Luetkemeyer	Kevin Miller
Party	Republican	Democratic
Popular vote	249,865	102,891
Percentage	67.8%	27.9%
- Luetkemeyer: 60–70% 70–80% 80–90%
U.S. Representative before election
Blaine Luetkemeyer
Republican
Elected U.S. Representative
Blaine Luetkemeyer
Republican

The third district stretches from exurbs of St. Louis to the state capitol Jefferson City. Incumbent Republican Blaine Luetkemeyer, who had represented the district since 2009, ran for re-election. He was re-elected with 68% of the vote in 2014. The district had a PVI of R+13.

=== Republican primary ===
Luetkemeyer had been speculated about as a potential candidate for Governor of Missouri in the 2016, rather than as a candidate for re-election. In January 2015, Luetkemeyer said that he would "probably" run for re-election and not run for governor.

==== Candidates ====
===== Nominee =====
- Blaine Luetkemeyer, incumbent U.S. Representative

===== Eliminated in primary =====
- Cynthia Davis, former state representative and Constitution nominee for Lieutenant Governor in 2012

==== Results ====
Republican primary results
Party	Candidate	Votes	%
Republican	Blaine Luetkemeyer (incumbent)	84,274	73.5
Republican	Cynthia Davis	30,440	26.5
Total votes		114,714	100.0

=== Democratic primary ===
==== Candidates ====
===== Nominee =====
- Kevin Miller

==== Results ====
Democratic primary results
Party	Candidate	Votes	%
Democratic	Kevin Miller	26,369	100.0
Total votes		40,379	100.0

=== Libertarian primary ===
==== Candidates ====
===== Nominee =====
- Dan Hogan

==== Results ====
Libertarian primary results
Party	Candidate	Votes	%
Libertarian	Dan Hogan	483	100.0
Total votes		483	100.0

=== Constitution primary ===
==== Candidates ====
===== Nominee =====
- Doanita Simmons

==== Results ====
Constitution primary results
Party	Candidate	Votes	%
Constitution	Doanita Simmons	80	100.0
Total votes		80	100.0

=== General election ===
==== Predictions ====
Source	Ranking	As of
The Cook Political Report	Safe R	November 7, 2016
Daily Kos Elections	Safe R	November 7, 2016
Rothenberg	Safe R	November 3, 2016
Sabato's Crystal Ball	Safe R	November 7, 2016
RCP	Safe R	October 31, 2016

==== Results ====
Missouri’s 3rd congressional district, 2016
Party	Candidate	Votes	%
Republican	Blaine Luetkemeyer (incumbent)	249,865	67.8
Democratic	Kevin Miller	102,891	27.9
Libertarian	Dan Hogan	11,962	3.3
Constitution	Doanita Simmons	3,605	1.0
Independent	Harold Davis (write-in)	10	0.0
Total votes		368,333	100.0
Republican hold			

== District 4 ==
2016 Missouri's 4th congressional district election
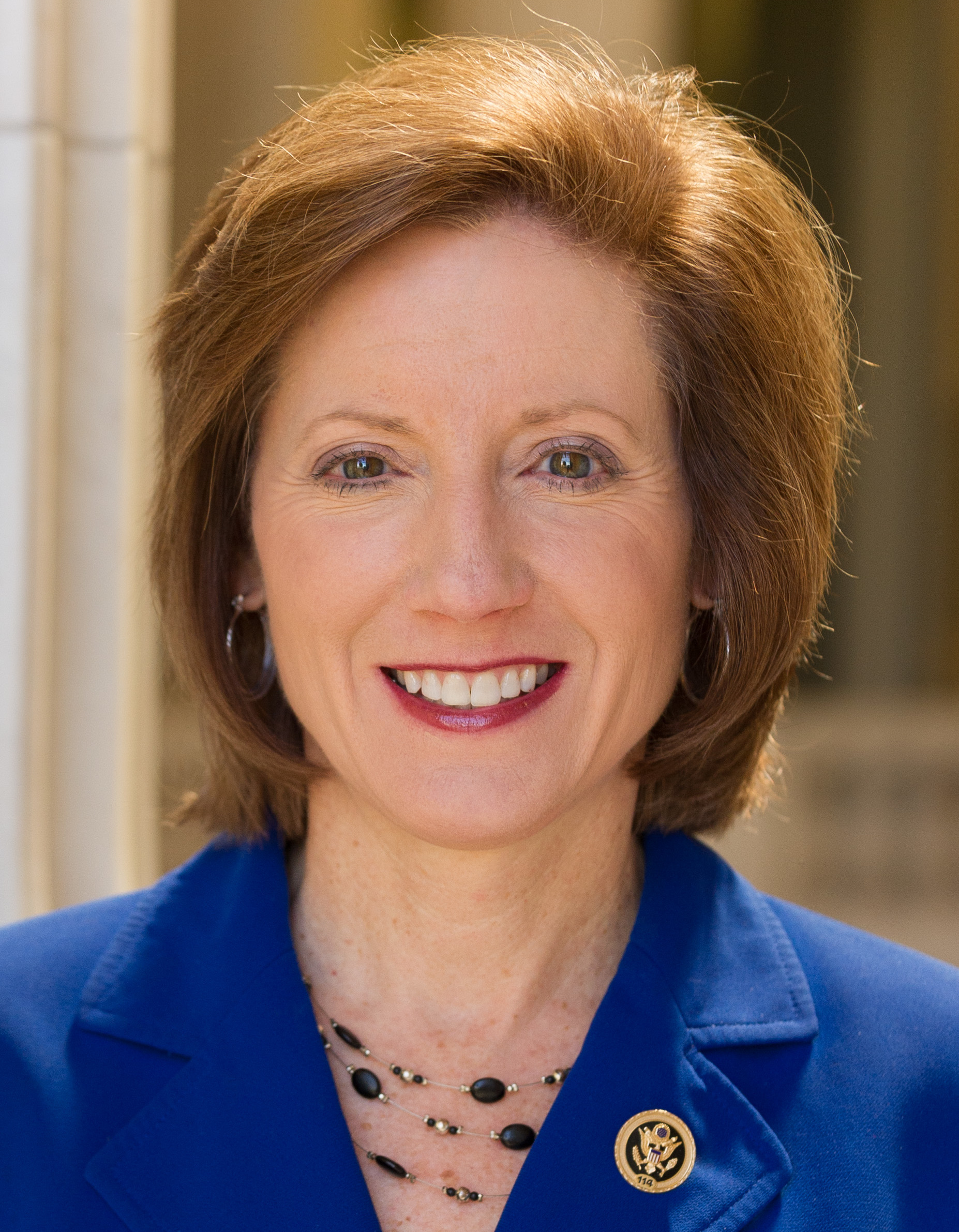

Nominee	Vicky Hartzler	Gordon Christensen
Party	Republican	Democratic
Popular vote	225,348	92,510
Percentage	67.8%	27.8%
- Hartzler: 40–50% 60–70% 70–80% 80–90%
U.S. Representative before election
Vicky Hartzler
Republican
Elected U.S. Representative
Vicky Hartzler
Republican

The fourth district takes in Columbia and much of rural west-central Missouri. Incumbent Republican Vicky Hartzler, who had represented the district since 2011, ran for re-election. She was re-elected in 2014 with 68% of the vote. The district had a PVI of R+13.

=== Republican primary ===
==== Candidates ====
===== Nominee =====
- Vicky Hartzler, incumbent U.S. Representative

===== Eliminated in primary =====
- John Webb, small business owner and candidate for this seat in 2014

==== Results ====
Republican primary results
Party	Candidate	Votes	%
Republican	Vicky Hartzler (incumbent)	73,853	72.5
Republican	John E Webb	28,037	27.5
Total votes		101,890	100.0

=== Democratic primary ===
Jim White, a retired investment banker and 2012 State House candidate, was also running but announced on February 22, 2016, that he was suspending his campaign due to medical issues.

==== Candidates ====
===== Nominee =====
- Gordon Christensen, University of Missouri Hospital Chief of Staff

===== Eliminated in primary =====
- Jack Truman, candidate for the 7th District in 2004, and nominee in 2006

===== Withdrawn =====
- Jim White, retired investment banker and candidate for state representative in 2012

==== Results ====
Democratic primary results
Party	Candidate	Votes	%
Democratic	Gordon Christensen	17,160	62.7
Democratic	Jack Truman	10,196	37.3
Total votes		27,356	100.0

=== Libertarian primary ===
==== Candidates ====
===== Nominee =====
- Mark Bliss, co-pastor of a Warrensburg church group

==== Results ====
Libertarian primary results
Party	Candidate	Votes	%
Libertarian	Mark Bliss	521	100.0
Total votes		521	100.0

=== General election ===
==== Predictions ====
Source	Ranking	As of
The Cook Political Report	Safe R	November 7, 2016
Daily Kos Elections	Safe R	November 7, 2016
Rothenberg	Safe R	November 3, 2016
Sabato's Crystal Ball	Safe R	November 7, 2016
RCP	Safe R	October 31, 2016

==== Results ====
Missouri’s 4th congressional district, 2016
Party	Candidate	Votes	%
Republican	Vicky Hartzler (incumbent)	225,348	67.8
Democratic	Gordon Christensen	92,510	27.8
Libertarian	Mark Bliss	14,376	4.3
Total votes		332,234	100.0
Republican hold			

== District 5 ==
2016 Missouri's 5th congressional district election
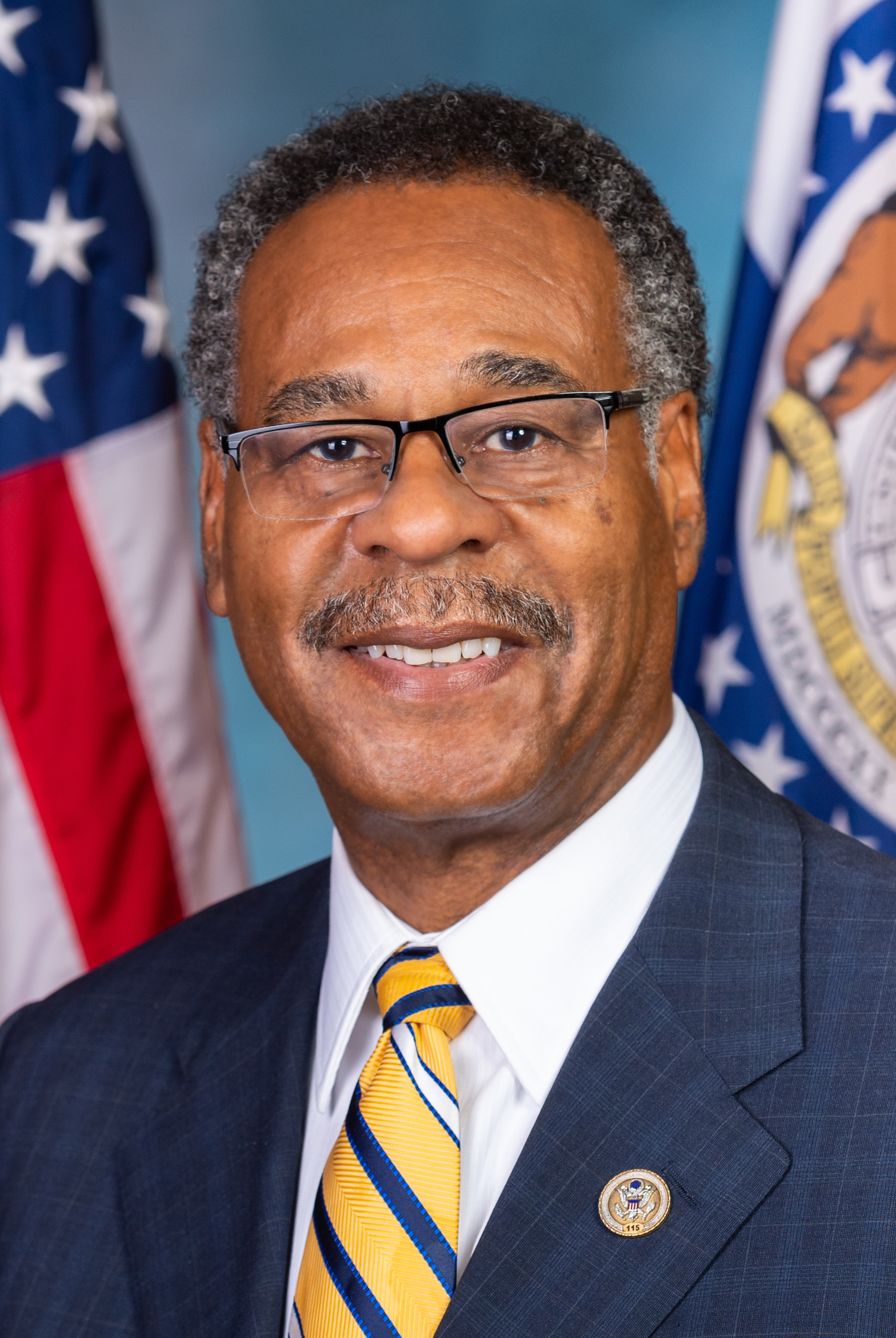

Nominee	Emanuel Cleaver	Jacob Turk
Party	Democratic	Republican
Popular vote	190,776	123,771
Percentage	58.8%	38.2%
- Cleaver: 50–60% 60–70% Turk: 50–60% 60–70%
U.S. Representative before election
Emanuel Cleaver
Democratic
Elected U.S. Representative
Emanuel Cleaver
Democratic

The fifth district encompasses most of Jackson County, the southern part of Clay County, and three other rural counties to the east. Incumbent Democrat Emanuel Cleaver, who had represented the district since 2005, ran for re-election. He was re-elected with 51.6% of the vote in 2014. The district had a PVI of D+9.

=== Democratic primary ===
==== Candidates ====
===== Nominee =====
- Emanuel Cleaver, incumbent U.S. Representative

===== Eliminated in primary =====
- Roberta Gough

==== Results ====
Democratic primary results
Party	Candidate	Votes	%
Democratic	Emanuel Cleaver (incumbent)	48,755	88.2
Democratic	Roberta Gough	6,519	11.8
Total votes		55,274	100.0

=== Republican primary ===
==== Candidates ====
===== Nominee =====
- Jacob Turk, Marine Corps veteran and nominee for this seat in 2006 and 2008, 2010, 2012 & 2014

===== Eliminated in primary =====
- Austin Rucker
- Berton Knox, US Merchant Marine chief engineer and candidate for this seat in 2014
- Michael Burris, businessman and candidate for this seat in 2014

==== Results ====
Republican primary results
Party	Candidate	Votes	%
Republican	Jacob Turk	28,096	68.0
Republican	Michael Burris	6,898	16.7
Republican	Austin Rucker	4,137	10.0
Republican	Berton A. Knox	2,166	5.3
Total votes		41,297	100.0

=== Libertarian primary ===
==== Candidates ====
===== Nominee =====
- Roy Welborn

==== Results ====
Libertarian primary results
Party	Candidate	Votes	%
Libertarian	Roy Welborn	577	100.0
Total votes		577	100.0

=== General election ===
==== Predictions ====
Source	Ranking	As of
The Cook Political Report	Safe D	November 7, 2016
Daily Kos Elections	Safe D	November 7, 2016
Rothenberg	Safe D	November 3, 2016
Sabato's Crystal Ball	Safe D	November 7, 2016
RCP	Safe D	October 31, 2016

==== Results ====
Missouri’s 5th congressional district, 2016
Party	Candidate	Votes	%
Democratic	Emanuel Cleaver (incumbent)	190,766	58.8
Republican	Jacob Turk	123,771	38.2
Libertarian	Roy Welborn	9,733	3.0
Total votes		324,270	100.0
Democratic hold			

== District 6 ==
2016 Missouri's 6th congressional district election
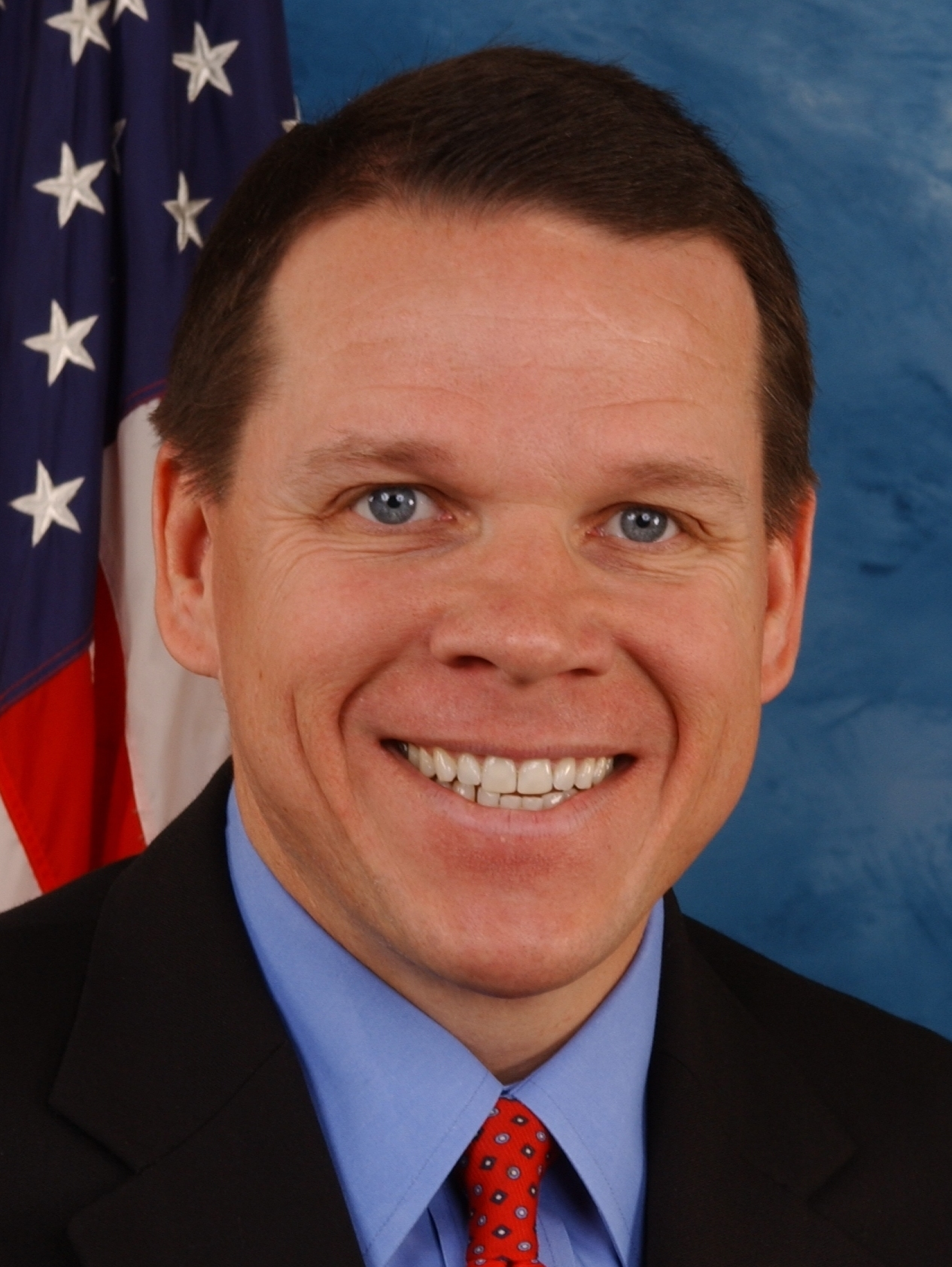

Nominee	Sam Graves	David Blackwell
Party	Republican	Democratic
Popular vote	238,388	99,692
Percentage	68.0%	28.5%
- Graves: 60–70% 70–80% 80–90%
U.S. Representative before election
Sam Graves
Republican
Elected U.S. Representative
Sam Graves
Republican

The sixth district encompasses rural northern Missouri. Incumbent Republican Sam Graves, who had represented the district since 2001, ran for re-election. He was re-elected with 67% of the vote in 2014. The district had a PVI of R+12.

=== Republican primary ===
Donnie Swartz was challenging Graves for the Republican nomination, but was arrested for distribution of controlled substances.

==== Candidates ====
===== Nominee =====
- Sam Graves, incumbent U.S. Representative

===== Eliminated in primary =====
- Kyle Reid, farmer and candidate for this seat in 2014
- Christopher Ryan, stay-at-home father, former U.S. Marine and candidate for this seat in 2010, 2012 and 2014

===== Withdrawn =====
- Donnie Swartz

==== Results ====
Republican primary results
Party	Candidate	Votes	%
Republican	Sam Graves (incumbent)	62,764	76.2
Republican	Christopher Ryan	11,686	14.2
Republican	Kyle Reid	7,910	9.6
Total votes		82,360	100.0

=== Democratic primary ===
==== Candidates ====
===== Nominee =====
- David Blackwell

===== Eliminated in primary =====
- Edward Dwayne Fields, candidate for this seat in 2014
- Kyle Yarber, teacher and nominee for this seat in 2012
- Matthew McNabney
- Travis Gonzales

==== Results ====
Democratic primary results
Party	Candidate	Votes	%
Democratic	David Blackwell	7,983	28.0
Democratic	Kyle Yarber	7,116	24.9
Democratic	Travis Gonzalez	6,623	23.2
Democratic	Edward Dwayne Fields	3,881	13.6
Democratic	Matthew McNabney	2,931	10.3
Total votes		28,534	100.0

=== Libertarian primary ===
==== Candidates ====
===== Nominee =====
- Russ Lee Monchil

==== Results ====
Libertarian primary results
Party	Candidate	Votes	%
Libertarian	Russ Lee Monchil	385	100.0
Total votes		385	100.0

=== Green Party ===
==== Candidates ====
===== Nominee =====
- Mike Diel

=== General election ===
==== Predictions ====
Source	Ranking	As of
The Cook Political Report	Safe R	November 7, 2016
Daily Kos Elections	Safe R	November 7, 2016
Rothenberg	Safe R	November 3, 2016
Sabato's Crystal Ball	Safe R	November 7, 2016
RCP	Safe R	October 31, 2016

==== Results ====
Missouri’s 6th congressional district, 2016
Party	Candidate	Votes	%
Republican	Sam Graves (incumbent)	238,388	68.0
Democratic	David Blackwell	99,692	28.5
Libertarian	Russ Lee Monchil	8,123	2.3
Green	Mike Diel	4,241	1.2
Total votes		350,444	100.0
Republican hold			

== District 7 ==
2016 Missouri's 7th congressional district election
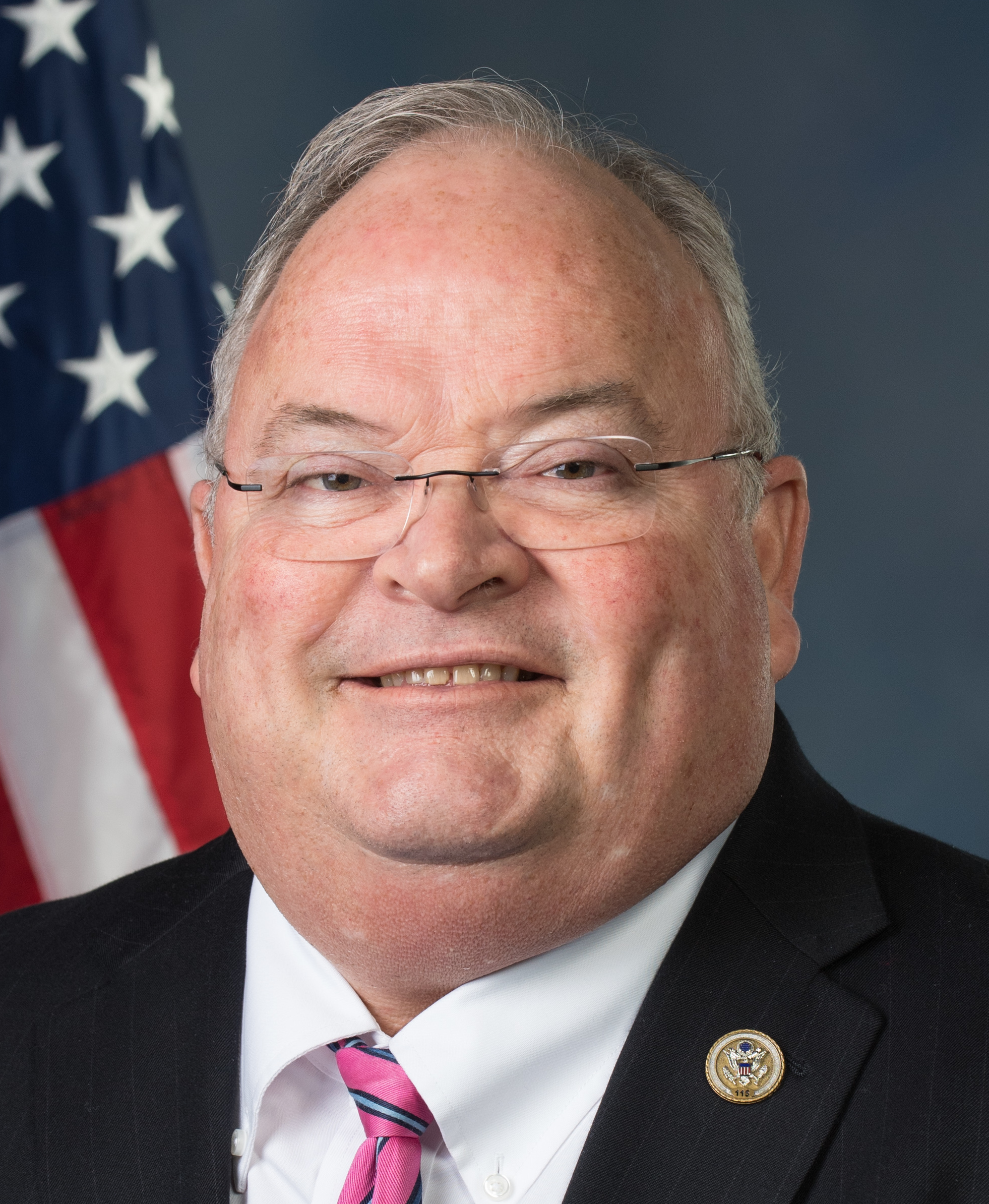

Nominee	Billy Long	Genevieve Williams	Benjamin T. Brixey
Party	Republican	Democratic	Libertarian
Popular vote	228,692	92,756	17,153
Percentage	67.5%	27.4%	5.1%
U.S. Representative before election
Billy Long
Republican
Elected U.S. Representative
Billy Long
Republican

The seventh district takes in Springfield, Joplin, and much of the rest of rural southwestern Missouri. Incumbent Republican Billy Long, who had represented the district since 2011, ran for re-election. He was re-elected with 63% of the vote in 2014. The district had a PVI of R+19, the most strongly Republican district of Missouri.

=== Republican primary ===
Businessman Christopher Batsche previously announced a primary challenge of Senator Roy Blunt but withdrew from that race and filed to challenge Long for the Republican nomination.

==== Candidates ====
===== Nominee =====
- Billy Long, incumbent U.S. Representative

===== Eliminated in primary =====
- Christopher Batsche, businessman
- Nathan Bradham
- Mary Byrne, national speaker and co-founding member of Missouri Coalition Against Common Core
- Matt Canovi, civilian Law Enforcement contractor
- Matthew Evans
- James Nelson
- Lyndle Spencer, law enforcement officer and Iraq combat veteran

==== Results ====
Republican primary results
Party	Candidate	Votes	%
Republican	Billy Long (incumbent)	67,012	62.4
Republican	Mary Byrne	14,069	13.1
Republican	Matt Canovi	9,538	8.9
Republican	Matthew Evans	5,346	5.0
Republican	Christopher Batsche	4,860	4.5
Republican	Lyndle Spencer	3,537	3.3
Republican	James Nelson	2,037	1.9
Republican	Nathan Clay Bradham	1,042	0.8
Total votes		107,441	100.0

=== Democratic primary ===
==== Candidates ====
===== Nominee =====
- Genevieve Williams, small business owner, Missouri Democratic Party committee member and candidate for this seat in 2014

===== Eliminated in primary =====
- Camille Lombardi-Olive
- Steven Reed

==== Results ====
Democratic primary results
Party	Candidate	Votes	%
Democratic	Genevieve Williams	9,402	52.1
Democratic	Steven Reed	4,915	27.3
Democratic	Camille Lombardi-Olive	3,714	20.6
Total votes		18,031	100.0

=== Libertarian primary ===
==== Candidates ====
===== Nominee =====
- Benjamin Brixey, Secretary of the Greene County Libertarian Party

==== Results ====
Libertarian primary results
Party	Candidate	Votes	%
Libertarian	Benjamin T. Brixey	398	100.0
Total votes		398	100.0

=== General election ===
==== Predictions ====
Source	Ranking	As of
The Cook Political Report	Safe R	November 7, 2016
Daily Kos Elections	Safe R	November 7, 2016
Rothenberg	Safe R	November 3, 2016
Sabato's Crystal Ball	Safe R	November 7, 2016
RCP	Safe R	October 31, 2016

==== Results ====
Missouri’s 7th congressional district, 2016
Party	Candidate	Votes	%
Republican	Billy Long (incumbent)	228,692	67.5
Democratic	Genevieve Williams	92,756	27.4
Libertarian	Benjamin T. Brixey	17,153	5.1
Independent	Amber Thomsen (write-in)	6	0.0
Total votes		338,607	100.0
Republican hold			

== District 8 ==
2016 Missouri's 8th congressional district election
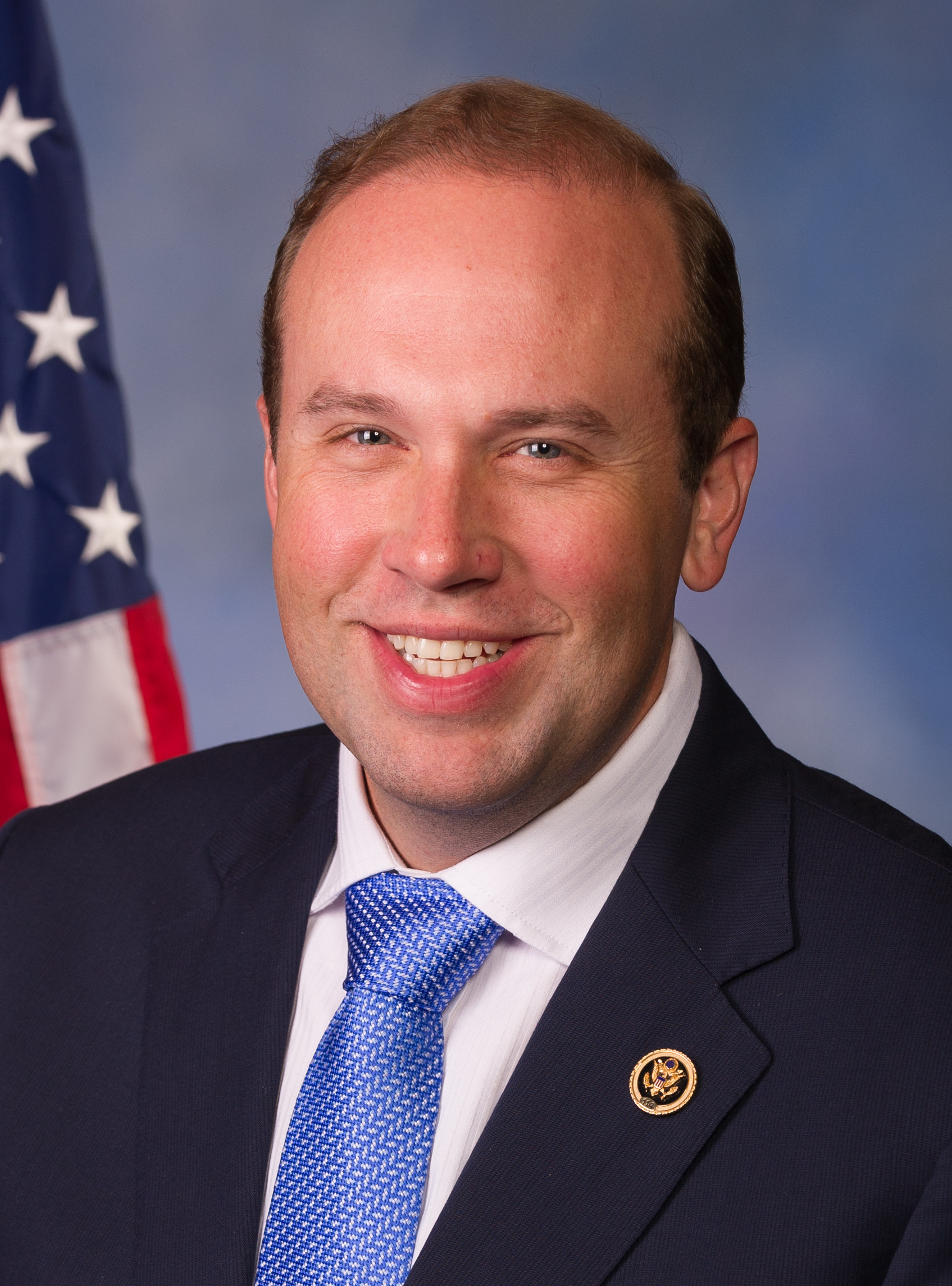

Nominee	Jason Smith	Dave Cowell
Party	Republican	Democratic
Popular vote	229,792	70,009
Percentage	74.4%	22.7%
- Smith: 60–70% 70–80% 80–90%
U.S. Representative before election
Jason Smith
Republican
Elected U.S. Representative
Jason Smith
Republican

The eighth district is the most rural district of Missouri, taking in all of the rural southeastern and south-central part of the state. Incumbent Republican Jason Smith, who had represented the district since June 2013, ran for re-election. He was re-elected with 67% of the vote in 2014. The district had a PVI of R+17.

=== Republican primary ===
==== Candidates ====
===== Nominee =====
- Jason Smith, incumbent U.S. Representative

===== Eliminated in primary =====
- Hal Brown, doctor
- Phillip Smith, U.S. Army veteran
- Todd Mahn, funeral home owner and Democratic candidate for this seat in 2012 & 2013

==== Results ====
Republican primary results
Party	Candidate	Votes	%
Republican	Jason Smith (incumbent)	65,450	67.5
Republican	Hal Brown	15,342	15.8
Republican	Todd Mahn	11,564	11.9
Republican	Phillip Smith	4,602	4.8
Total votes		96,958	100.0

=== Democratic primary ===
==== Candidates ====
===== Nominee =====
- Dave Cowell, electronics store manager

==== Results ====
Democratic primary results
Party	Candidate	Votes	%
Democratic	Dave Cowell	22,314	100.0
Total votes		22,314	100.0

=== Libertarian primary ===
==== Results ====
Libertarian primary results
Party	Candidate	Votes	%
Libertarian	Jonathan Shell	254	100.0
Total votes		254	100.0

=== General election ===
==== Predictions ====
Source	Ranking	As of
The Cook Political Report	Safe R	November 7, 2016
Daily Kos Elections	Safe R	November 7, 2016
Rothenberg	Safe R	November 3, 2016
Sabato's Crystal Ball	Safe R	November 7, 2016
RCP	Safe R	October 31, 2016

==== Results ====
Missouri’s 8th congressional district, 2016
Party	Candidate	Votes	%
Republican	Jason Smith (incumbent)	229,792	74.4
Democratic	Dave Cowell	70,009	22.7
Libertarian	Jonathan Shell	9,070	2.9
Total votes		308,871	100.0
Republican hold			
