= Senator Bass =

Senator Bass may refer to:

- Adam Bass (politician) (fl. 2020s), Louisiana State Senate
- Charles Bass (born 1952), New Hampshire State Senate
- Earl Bass (1915–2002), Iowa State Senate
- James O. Bass (1910–2019), Tennessee State Senate
- John Bass (politician) (1926–2007), Missouri State Senate
- Perkins Bass (1912–2011), New Hampshire State Senate
- Randy Bass (born 1954), Oklahoma State Senate
- Robert P. Bass (1873–1960), New Hampshire State Senate
- Ross Bass (1918–1993), U.S. Senator from Tennessee from 1964 to 1967
