= Missouri's 2nd congressional district =

U.S. House district for Missouri

Coordinates: 38°36′11″N 90°31′56″W

- Interactive map of district boundaries since January 3, 2023
- Representative: Ann Wagner; R–Ballwin
- Population (2025): 779,021
- Median household income: $107,341
- Ethnicity: 84.2% White; 4.6% Asian; 4.3% Two or more races; 3.2% Black; 3.2% Hispanic; 0.5% other
- Cook PVI: R+4

Missouri's second congressional district is in the eastern portion of the state, primarily consisting of the suburbs south and west of St. Louis, including Arnold, Town and Country, Wildwood, Chesterfield, and Oakville. The district includes all of Franklin County and portions of St. Louis, St. Charles, and Warren counties. Following redistricting in 2010, the St. Louis Post-Dispatch reported that the district now included more Democratic-leaning voters than it had its 2001–2010 boundaries, but still leaned Republican as a whole. The latest U.S. Census Electorate Profile for the 2nd congressional district estimates there are 581,131 citizens of voting age living in 293,984 households. A primarily suburban district, MO-02 is the wealthiest of Missouri's congressional districts.

Its current representative is Republican Ann Wagner, who was first elected in 2012.

== Composition ==
For the 118th and successive Congresses (based on redistricting following the 2020 census), the district contains all or portions of the following counties, townships, and municipalities:

Franklin County (14)

All 14 communities

St. Charles County (10)

Augusta, Dardenne Prairie, Defiance, Foristell (part; also 3rd; shared with Warren County), Lake St. Louis (part; also 3rd), New Melle, O'Fallon (part; also 3rd), Weldon Spring (part; also 3rd), Weldon Spring Heights, Wentzville (part; also 3rd)

St. Louis County (45)

Affton, Ballwin, Brentwood (part; also 1st), Chesterfield, Clarkson Valley, Concord, Country Life Acres, Crestwood, Creve Coeur (part; also 1st), Crystal Lake Park, Des Peres, Ellisville, Eureka (part; also 3rd; shared with Jefferson County), Fenton, Frontenac (part; also 1st), Glendale (part; also 1st), Grantwood Village, Green Park, Huntleigh, Kirkwood, Ladue (part; also 1st), Lakeshire, Lemay, Manchester, Maplewood, Marlborough, Maryland Heights (part; also 1st), Mehlville, Oakland, Oakville, Pacific (shared with Franklin County), Richmond Heights (part; also 1st), Sappington, Shrewsbury, St. George, Sunset Hills, Town and Country, Twin Oaks, Valley Park, Warson Woods, Webster Groves (part; also 1st), Westwood, Wilbur Park, Wildwood, Winchester

Warren County (8)

Foristell (part; also 3rd; shared with St. Charles County), Innsbrook, Marthasville, Pendleton, Three Creeks, Truesdale, Warrenton (part; also 3rd), Wright City (part; also 3rd)

== List of members representing the district ==
Member	Party	Years	Cong ress	Electoral history	District location
District created March 4, 1847
John Jameson (Fulton)	Democratic	March 4, 1847 – March 3, 1849	30th	Elected in 1846. Retired.	1847–1853 [data missing]
William Van Ness Bay (Union)	Democratic	March 4, 1849 – March 3, 1851	31st	Elected in 1848. Retired.	1847–1853 [data missing]
Gilchrist Porter (Bowling Green)	Whig	March 4, 1851 – March 3, 1853	32nd	Elected in 1850. Lost re-election.	1847–1853 [data missing]
Alfred W. Lamb (Hannibal)	Democratic	March 4, 1853 – March 3, 1855	33rd	Elected in 1852. Retired.	1853–1863 [data missing]
Gilchrist Porter (Hannibal)	Opposition	March 4, 1855 – March 3, 1857	34th	Elected in 1854. Retired.	1853–1863 [data missing]
Thomas L. Anderson (Palmyra)	Know Nothing	March 4, 1857 – March 3, 1859	35th 36th	Elected in 1856. Re-elected in 1858. Retired.	1853–1863 [data missing]
Thomas L. Anderson (Palmyra)	Independent Democratic	March 4, 1859 – March 3, 1861	35th 36th	Elected in 1856. Re-elected in 1858. Retired.	1853–1863 [data missing]
James S. Rollins (Columbia)	Constitutional Union	March 4, 1861 – March 3, 1863	37th	Elected in 1860. Redistricted to the 9th district.	1853–1863 [data missing]
Henry T. Blow (St. Louis)	Unconditional Unionist	March 4, 1863 – March 3, 1865	38th 39th	Elected in 1862. Re-elected in 1864. Retired.	1863–1873 [data missing]
Henry T. Blow (St. Louis)	Republican	March 4, 1865 – March 3, 1867	38th 39th	Elected in 1862. Re-elected in 1864. Retired.	1863–1873 [data missing]
Carman A. Newcomb (Vineland)	Republican	March 4, 1867 – March 3, 1869	40th	Elected in 1866. Retired.	1863–1873 [data missing]
Gustavus A. Finkelnburg (St. Louis)	Republican	March 4, 1869 – March 3, 1871	41st 42nd	Elected in 1868. Re-elected in 1870. Retired.	1863–1873 [data missing]
Gustavus A. Finkelnburg (St. Louis)	Liberal Republican	March 4, 1871 – March 3, 1873	41st 42nd	Elected in 1868. Re-elected in 1870. Retired.	1863–1873 [data missing]
Erastus Wells (St. Louis)	Democratic	March 4, 1873 – March 3, 1877	43rd 44th	Redistricted from the 1st district and re-elected in 1872. Re-elected in 1874. Lost re-election.	1873–1883 [data missing]
Nathan Cole (St. Louis)	Republican	March 4, 1877 – March 3, 1879	45th	Elected in 1876. Lost re-election.	1873–1883 [data missing]
Erastus Wells (St. Louis)	Democratic	March 4, 1879 – March 3, 1881	46th	Elected in 1878. Retired.	1873–1883 [data missing]
Thomas Allen (St. Louis)	Democratic	March 4, 1881 – April 8, 1882	47th	Elected in 1880. Died.	1873–1883 [data missing]
Vacant		April 8, 1882 – December 15, 1882	47th		1873–1883 [data missing]
James H. McLean (St. Louis)	Republican	December 15, 1882 – March 3, 1883	47th	Elected to finish Allen's term. and seated December 15, 1882. Redistricted the same day to the 9th district and lost election to the next term.	1873–1883 [data missing]
Armstead M. Alexander (Paris)	Democratic	March 4, 1883 – March 3, 1885	48th	Elected in 1882. Lost renomination.	1883–1893 [data missing]
John B. Hale (Carrollton)	Democratic	March 4, 1885 – March 3, 1887	49th	Elected in 1884. Lost renomination and lost re-election as an independent..	1883–1893 [data missing]
Charles H. Mansur (Chillicothe)	Democratic	March 4, 1887 – March 3, 1893	50th 51st 52nd	Elected in 1886. Re-elected in 1888. Re-elected in 1890. Lost renomination.	1883–1893 [data missing]
Uriel S. Hall (Hubbard)	Democratic	March 4, 1893 – March 3, 1897	53rd 54th	Elected in 1892. Re-elected in 1894. Retired.	1893–1903 [data missing]
Robert N. Bodine (Paris)	Democratic	March 4, 1897 – March 3, 1899	55th	Elected in 1896. Lost renomination.	1893–1903 [data missing]
William W. Rucker (Keytesville)	Democratic	March 4, 1899 – March 3, 1923	56th 57th 58th 59th 60th 61st 62nd 63rd 64th 65th 66th 67th	Elected in 1898. Re-elected in 1900. Re-elected in 1902. Re-elected in 1904. Re-elected in 1906. Re-elected in 1908. Re-elected in 1910. Re-elected in 1912. Re-elected in 1914. Re-elected in 1916. Re-elected in 1918. Re-elected in 1920. Lost renomination.	1893–1903 [data missing]
William W. Rucker (Keytesville)	Democratic	March 4, 1899 – March 3, 1923	56th 57th 58th 59th 60th 61st 62nd 63rd 64th 65th 66th 67th	Elected in 1898. Re-elected in 1900. Re-elected in 1902. Re-elected in 1904. Re-elected in 1906. Re-elected in 1908. Re-elected in 1910. Re-elected in 1912. Re-elected in 1914. Re-elected in 1916. Re-elected in 1918. Re-elected in 1920. Lost renomination.	1903–1913 [data missing]
William W. Rucker (Keytesville)	Democratic	March 4, 1899 – March 3, 1923	56th 57th 58th 59th 60th 61st 62nd 63rd 64th 65th 66th 67th	Elected in 1898. Re-elected in 1900. Re-elected in 1902. Re-elected in 1904. Re-elected in 1906. Re-elected in 1908. Re-elected in 1910. Re-elected in 1912. Re-elected in 1914. Re-elected in 1916. Re-elected in 1918. Re-elected in 1920. Lost renomination.	1913–1923 [data missing]
Ralph F. Lozier (Carrollton)	Democratic	March 4, 1923 – March 3, 1933	68th 69th 70th 71st 72nd	Elected in 1922. Re-elected in 1924. Re-elected in 1926. Re-elected in 1928. Re-elected in 1930. Redistricted to the at-large district.	1923–1933 [data missing]
District inactive		March 4, 1933 – January 3, 1935	73rd	All representatives elected At-large on a general ticket.	
William L. Nelson (Columbia)	Democratic	January 3, 1935 – January 3, 1943	74th 75th 76th 77th	Elected in 1934. Re-elected in 1936. Re-elected in 1938. Re-elected in 1940. Lost re-election.	1935–1943 [data missing]
Max Schwabe (Columbia)	Republican	January 3, 1943 – January 3, 1949	78th 79th 80th	Elected in 1942. Re-elected in 1944. Re-elected in 1946. Lost re-election.	1943–1953 [data missing]
Morgan M. Moulder (Camdenton)	Democratic	January 3, 1949 – January 3, 1953	81st 82nd	Elected in 1948. Re-elected in 1950. Redistricted to the 11th district.	1943–1953 [data missing]
Thomas B. Curtis (Webster Groves)	Republican	January 3, 1953 – January 3, 1969	83rd 84th 85th 86th 87th 88th 89th 90th	Redistricted from the 12th district and re-elected in 1952. Re-elected in 1954. Re-elected in 1956. Re-elected in 1958. Re-elected in 1960. Re-elected in 1962. Re-elected in 1964. Re-elected in 1966. Retired to run for U.S. senator.	1953–1963 [data missing]
Thomas B. Curtis (Webster Groves)	Republican	January 3, 1953 – January 3, 1969	83rd 84th 85th 86th 87th 88th 89th 90th	Redistricted from the 12th district and re-elected in 1952. Re-elected in 1954. Re-elected in 1956. Re-elected in 1958. Re-elected in 1960. Re-elected in 1962. Re-elected in 1964. Re-elected in 1966. Retired to run for U.S. senator.	1963–1973 [data missing]
James W. Symington (Ladue)	Democratic	January 3, 1969 – January 3, 1977	91st 92nd 93rd 94th	Elected in 1968. Re-elected in 1970. Re-elected in 1972. Re-elected in 1974. Retired to run for U.S. senator.	1963–1973 [data missing]
James W. Symington (Ladue)	Democratic	January 3, 1969 – January 3, 1977	91st 92nd 93rd 94th	Elected in 1968. Re-elected in 1970. Re-elected in 1972. Re-elected in 1974. Retired to run for U.S. senator.	1973–1983 [data missing]
Robert A. Young (Maryland Heights)	Democratic	January 3, 1977 – January 3, 1987	95th 96th 97th 98th 99th	Elected in 1976. Re-elected in 1978. Re-elected in 1980. Re-elected in 1982. Re-elected in 1984. Lost re-election.	1973–1983 [data missing]
Robert A. Young (Maryland Heights)	Democratic	January 3, 1977 – January 3, 1987	95th 96th 97th 98th 99th	Elected in 1976. Re-elected in 1978. Re-elected in 1980. Re-elected in 1982. Re-elected in 1984. Lost re-election.	1983–1993 [data missing]
Jack Buechner (St. Louis)	Republican	January 3, 1987 – January 3, 1991	100th 101st	Elected in 1986. Re-elected in 1988. Lost re-election.	1983–1993 [data missing]
Joan Kelly Horn (St. Louis)	Democratic	January 3, 1991 – January 3, 1993	102nd	Elected in 1990. Lost re-election.	1983–1993 [data missing]
Jim Talent (Chesterfield)	Republican	January 3, 1993 – January 3, 2001	103rd 104th 105th 106th	Elected in 1992. Re-elected in 1994. Re-elected in 1996. Re-elected in 1998. Retired to run for Governor of Missouri.	1993–2003 [data missing]
Todd Akin (St. Louis)	Republican	January 3, 2001 – January 3, 2013	107th 108th 109th 110th 111th 112th	Elected in 2000. Re-elected in 2002. Re-elected in 2004. Re-elected in 2006. Re-elected in 2008. Re-elected in 2010. Retired to run for U.S. Senator.	1993–2003 [data missing]
Todd Akin (St. Louis)	Republican	January 3, 2001 – January 3, 2013	107th 108th 109th 110th 111th 112th	Elected in 2000. Re-elected in 2002. Re-elected in 2004. Re-elected in 2006. Re-elected in 2008. Re-elected in 2010. Retired to run for U.S. Senator.	2003–2013
Ann Wagner (Ballwin)	Republican	January 3, 2013 – present	113th 114th 115th 116th 117th 118th 119th	Elected in 2012. Re-elected in 2014. Re-elected in 2016. Re-elected in 2018. Re-elected in 2020. Re-elected in 2022. Re-elected in 2024. Lost re-election.	2013–2023
Ann Wagner (Ballwin)	Republican	January 3, 2013 – present	113th 114th 115th 116th 117th 118th 119th	Elected in 2012. Re-elected in 2014. Re-elected in 2016. Re-elected in 2018. Re-elected in 2020. Re-elected in 2022. Re-elected in 2024. Lost re-election.	2023–present
Fred Wellman (Wildwood)	Democratic	Assuming office on January 3, 2027		Elected in 2026.	2023–present

== Recent election results from statewide races ==
Year	Office	Results
2008	President	McCain 54% - 45%
2012	President	Romney 60% - 40%
2012	Senate	McCaskill 51% - 44%
2012	Governor	Nixon 50% - 48%
2016	President	Trump 56% - 39%
2016	Senate	Blunt 50% - 46%
2016	Governor	Greitens 52% - 45%
2016	Lt. Governor	Parson 54% - 42%
2016	Secretary of State	Ashcroft 59% - 37%
2016	Attorney General	Hawley 61% - 39%
2018	Senate	Hawley 50% - 48%
2018	Auditor	Galloway 52% - 43%
2020	President	Trump 53% - 45%
2020	Governor	Parson 54% - 44%
2020	Lt. Governor	Kehoe 57% - 41%
2020	Secretary of State	Ashcroft 59% - 38%
2020	Treasurer	Fitzpatrick 58% - 40%
2020	Attorney General	Schmitt 58% - 40%
2022	Senate	Schmitt 51% - 48%
2022	Auditor	Fitzpatrick 56% - 41%
2024	President	Trump 53% - 45%
2024	Senate	Hawley 50% - 47%
2024	Governor	Kehoe 56% - 42%
2024	Lt. Governor	Wasinger 54% - 42%
2024	Secretary of State	Hoskins 54% - 44%
2024	Treasurer	Malek 55% - 42%
2024	Attorney General	Bailey 55% - 43%

== Election results ==
=== 1998 ===
1998 Missouri's 2nd congressional election
Party	Candidate	Votes	%
Republican	Jim Talent (incumbent)	142,313	70.0%
Democratic	John Ross	57,565	28.3%
Libertarian	Brian K. Lundy	3,331	1.6%
Independent	William Warner	50	0.0%
Total votes		203,259	100.0%
Republican hold			

=== 2000 ===
2000 Missouri's 2nd congressional election
Party	Candidate	Votes	%
Republican	Todd Akin	164,926	55.3%
Democratic	Ted House	126,441	42.4%
Green	Mike Odell	2,907	1.0%
Libertarian	James Higgins	2,524	0.8%
Reform	Richard J. Gimpelson	1,265	0.4%
Total votes		298,062	100.0%
Republican hold			

=== 2002 ===
2002 Missouri's 2nd congressional election
Party	Candidate	Votes	%
Republican	Todd Akin (incumbent)	167,057	67.1%
Democratic	John Hogan	77,223	31.0%
Libertarian	Daria R. Maloney	4,548	1.8%
Total votes		248,828	100.0%
Republican hold			

=== 2004 ===
2004 Missouri's 2nd congressional election
Party	Candidate	Votes	%
Republican	Todd Akin (incumbent)	228,725	65.4%
Democratic	George D. Weber	115,366	33.0%
Libertarian	Daria R. Maloney	4,822	1.4%
Constitution	David Leefe	954	0.3%
Total votes		349,867	100.0%
Republican hold			

=== 2006 ===
2006 Missouri's 2nd congressional election
Party	Candidate	Votes	%
Republican	Todd Akin (incumbent)	176,452	61.3%
Democratic	George D. Weber	105,242	36.6%
Libertarian	Tamara A. Millay	5,923	2.1%
Total votes		287,617	100.0%
Republican hold			

=== 2008 ===
2008 Missouri's 2nd congressional election
Party	Candidate	Votes	%
Republican	Todd Akin (incumbent)	232,276	62.3%
Democratic	Bill Haas	132,068	35.4%
Libertarian	Thomas L. Knapp	8,628	2.3%
Total votes		372,972	100.0%
Republican hold			

=== 2010 ===
2010 Missouri's 2nd congressional election
Party	Candidate	Votes	%
Republican	Todd Akin (incumbent)	180,481	67.9%
Democratic	Arthur Lieber	77,467	29.2%
Libertarian	Steve Mosbacher	7,677	2.9%
Independent	Patrick M. Cannon	7	0.0%
Total votes		265,632	100.0%
Republican hold			

=== 2012 ===
2012 Missouri's 2nd congressional election
Party	Candidate	Votes	%
Republican	Ann Wagner	236,971	60.1%
Democratic	Glenn Koenen	146,272	37.1%
Libertarian	Bill Slantz	9,193	2.3%
Constitution	Anatol Zorikova	2,012	0.5%
Total votes		394,448	100.0%
Republican hold			

=== 2014 ===
2014 Missouri's 2nd congressional election
Party	Candidate	Votes	%
Republican	Ann Wagner (incumbent)	147,819	64.1%
Democratic	Arthur Lieber	75,384	32.6%
Libertarian	Bill Slantz	7,542	3.3%
Total votes		231,117	100.0%
Republican hold			

=== 2016 ===
2016 Missouri's 2nd congressional election
Party	Candidate	Votes	%
Republican	Ann Wagner (incumbent)	241,954	58.6%
Democratic	Bill Otto	155,689	37.7%
Libertarian	Jim Higgins	11,758	2.8%
Green	David Justus Arnold	3,605	0.9%
Total votes		413,296	100.0%
Republican hold			

=== 2018 ===
2018 Missouri's 2nd congressional election
Party	Candidate	Votes	%
Republican	Ann Wagner (incumbent)	192,477	51.2%
Democratic	Cort VanOstran	177,611	47.2%
Libertarian	Larry A. Kirk	4,229	1.1%
Green	David Justus Arnold	1,740	0.5%
Total votes		376,066	100.0%
Republican hold			

=== 2020 ===
2020 Missouri's 2nd congressional election
Party	Candidate	Votes	%
Republican	Ann Wagner (incumbent)	233,157	51.9%
Democratic	Jill Schupp	204,540	45.5%
Libertarian	Martin Schulte	11,647	2.6%
Write-ins		4	0.0%
Total votes		449,348	100.0%
Republican hold			

=== 2022 ===
2022 Missouri's 2nd congressional election
Party	Candidate	Votes	%
Republican	Ann Wagner (incumbent)	173,277	54.9%
Democratic	Trish Gunby	135,895	43.1%
Libertarian	Bill Slantz	6,494	2.1%
Total votes		315,666	100.0%
Republican hold			

=== 2024 ===
2024 Missouri's 2nd congressional election
Party	Candidate	Votes	%
Republican	Ann Wagner (incumbent)	233,444	54.5%
Democratic	Ray Hartmann	182,056	42.5%
Libertarian	Brandon Daugherty	8,951	2.0%
Green	Shelby Davis	3,941	0.9%
Total votes		428,392	100.0%
Republican hold			

== See also ==
- Missouri's congressional districts
- List of United States congressional districts
