= Tom Hannegan =

American businessman and politician (1970–2021)

Member of the Missouri House of Representatives from the 65th district
- In office January 2017 – October 20, 2021
- Preceded by: Anne Zerr
- Succeeded by: Wendy Hausman

Personal details
- Born: May 6, 1970 St. Charles, Missouri
- Died: October 20, 2021 (aged 51) St. Charles, Missouri
- Party: Republican
- Domestic partner: Scott Mell
- Education: Lindenwood University

Thomas P. Hannegan (May 6, 1970 – October 20, 2021) was an American businessman and politician from the state of Missouri. A Republican, Hannegan was elected to the Missouri House of Representatives from Missouri's 65th District in November 2016, and re-elected in 2018. He represented a portion of Saint Charles County north and northeast of the city of St. Charles to the Mississippi River. Hannegan also worked for a family-owned real estate business and as a magazine publisher and chief editor.

Hannegan was openly gay. In 2021, he was one of three LGBT Republicans serving in the Missouri House of Representatives, alongside representatives Phil Christofanelli and Chris Sander. His partner was Scott Mell, an account manager for Hannegan's magazine business.

Hannegan died from a stroke on October 20, 2021, at age 51.

== Election results ==
Missouri House of Representatives — District 65 — St. Charles County (2020)
Party	Candidate	Votes	%	±%
Republican	Tom Hannegan	10,779	54.06%	+3.09
Democratic	Bill Otto	9,159	45.94%	–3.09

Missouri House of Representatives — District 65 — St. Charles County (2018)
Party	Candidate	Votes	%	±%
Republican	Tom Hannegan	8,288	50.97%	−3.17
Democratic	Bill Otto	7,973	49.03%	+6.21

Missouri House of Representatives — District 65 — St. Charles County (2016)
Party	Candidate	Votes	%	±%
Republican	Tom Hannegan	9,716	54.14%	−45.86
Democratic	Kenny Biermann	7,684	42.82%	+42.82
Libertarian	Dean (Draig) Hodge	545	3.04%	+3.04
