= Bill Otto (Missouri politician) =

American politician (born 1956)

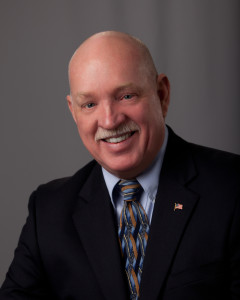

Member of the Missouri House of Representatives from the 70th district
- In office January 7, 2013 – January 4, 2017
- Succeeded by: Mark Matthiesen

Personal details
- Born: January 1, 1956 (age 70) St. Louis, Missouri, U.S.
- Party: Democratic
- Spouse: Kathy
- Children: 6
- Occupation: Air Traffic Controller (retired)
- Website: billotto.org

Bill Otto (born January 1, 1956) is a former Democratic member of the Missouri House of Representatives, representing District 70. He is a Navy veteran and retired air traffic controller. In 2016, Otto choose to run for the 2nd Congressional District seat rather than run for re-election on the state level. He ran a campaign with no primary opposition for the 2nd District Congressional seat and lost to Rep. Ann Wagner. In March 2017, Bill Otto was hired as the executive director of the St. Charles County Democratic Central Committee. In February 2018, Otto announced his run for the Missouri House District 65, located in St. Charles County; he lost to incumbent Tom Hannegan by less than two percent in November.

== Personal ==
Otto was born on January 1, 1956. At age 15 his mother died, and he was sent to a boys home. Otto was provided food and shelter until he was 17, when state law forced him to leave.

Otto went on to earn his GED, and attended Meramec Community College and Embry-Riddle Aeronautical University. He was in the United States Navy from 1976 to 1983 and served in VAQ-136 Prowler Squadron at Naval Air Station Whidbey Island.

After his service in the U.S. Navy, Otto worked as an air traffic controller for 31 years. He is a founding member of the National Air Traffic Controllers Association and served as a leader in the St. Louis area and later as president at the national level. Otto retired after 31 years as an air traffic controller.

He and his wife Kathy have been married for over 31 years and raised two sons and three daughters in Bridgeton, Missouri. Bill & Kathy have 9 grandchildren.

== Political career ==
From 1989 to 1995, Otto served on the Bridgeton City Council and worked on numerous candidates' campaigns. In 2012 he was elected to his first term in the Missouri House and was a leader in the efforts to end lobbyist gifts. He accepted zero dollars or gifts in all four of the years he served.

Missouri House of Representatives — District 70 — St. Charles County (2014)
Party	Candidate	Votes	%	±%
Democratic	Bill Otto	5,309	50.7%	
Republican	Joe Corica	5,155	49.3%	

Missouri House of Representatives — District 70 — St. Charles County (2012)
Party	Candidate	Votes	%	±%
Democratic	Bill Otto	9,254	52%	
Republican	Eugene Dokes	8,537	48%	

In his 2016 Congressional race against U.S. Rep. Ann Wagner, Otto raised more than $400,000. After a campaign with no primary opposition, Otto lost his bid for the 2nd District Congressional seat to Representative Ann Wagner.

2016 Election for U.S. Representative of Missouri's 2nd Congressional District
Party	Candidate	Votes	%
Republican	Ann Wagner	241,954	58.54
Democratic	Bill Otto	155,689	37.67
Libertarian	Jim Higgins	11,758	2.84
Green	David Justus Arnold	3,895	.94

In February 2018, Otto announced his run for Missouri House district 65. In the November general election, he lost to incumbent Republican Tom Hannegan by less than two percent of the vote.

Missouri House of Representatives — District 65 — St. Charles County (2018)
Party	Candidate	Votes	%	±%
Republican	Tom Hannegan	8,288	50.97%	−3.17
Democratic	Bill Otto	7,973	49.03%	+6.21

== Committee membership ==
- Consumer Affairs
- Veterans
- Banking
- Insurance
