= John Bass (politician) =

American politician

- Born: July 18, 1926
- Died: March 25, 2007 (aged 80)
- Education: Sumner High School (St. Louis); Lincoln University of Missouri (B.S.); Washington University in St. Louis (M.A.)
- Occupation: politician
- Years active: 1981–1991
- Known for: member, Missouri State Senate
- Political party: Democratic
- Spouse: Frieda Whitmore (m. 1946)

John Bass (July 18, 1926 – March 25, 2007) was an American boxer, schoolteacher, school principal, and Democratic politician from St. Louis, Missouri, who served in the Missouri State Senate from 1981 to 1991.

== Background ==
Bass was born in St. Louis on July 18, 1926. He graduated from Sumner High School, served in the United States Navy, and was successful enough as a boxer to win an athletic scholarship to Lincoln University, where he earned a B.S. in business administration, and went on to earn an M.A. in educational administration from Washington University in St. Louis. He became a teacher at, and eventually principal of, Beaumont High School. He also became active in the Democratic Party, which was overwhelmingly dominant in St. Louis city politics.

== Public office ==
Bass was tapped to serve as St. Louis' city Director of Welfare by then-Mayor of St. Louis Alfonso J. Cervantes. Bass, who gradually became alienated from Cervantes and closer to rival William Clay, Sr., won office as alderman from the 20th ward, first winning his seat in a special election. In 1973 Bass won the Democratic nomination for City Comptroller of St. Louis, with a plurality over three other aldermen (all white).

He was elected to the Senate in a 1981 special election and won re-election twice, eventually resigning to take a staff post on a Congressional committee headed by long-time political ally William Clay, Sr. This in turn freed up Bass' senate seat to be won by Clay's son, state representative William Clay, Jr., who was described by a potential rival as having the seat "sewn up" before the campaign began.

== Personal life ==
He married Frieda Whitmore in 1946. Their granddaughter, Kacie Starr Triplett, won nomination as St. Louis alderman a few days after Bass' death, and was unopposed in the general election.
