= Lacy Clay =

American politician (born 1956)

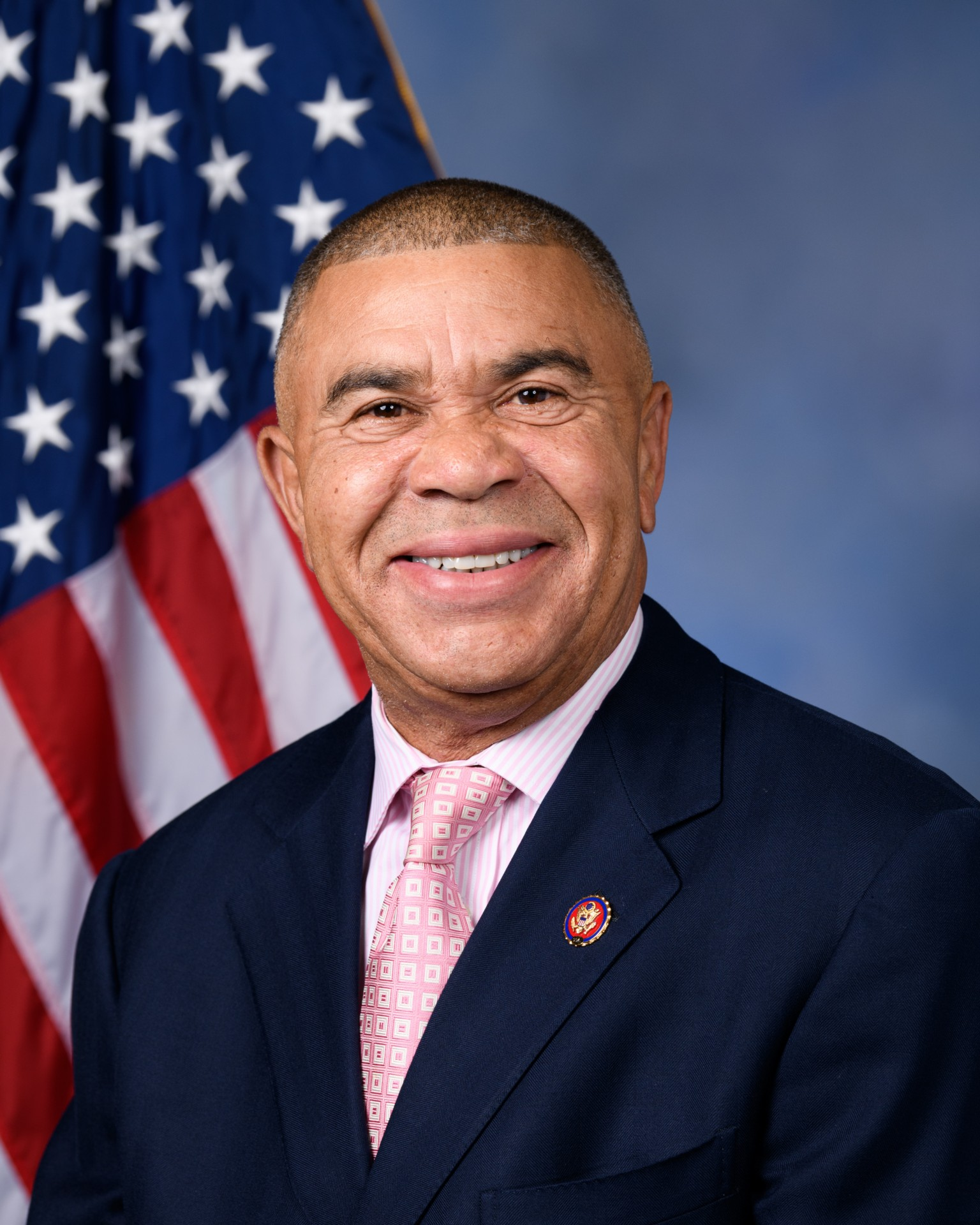
- Official portrait, 2019

Member of the U.S. House of Representatives from Missouri's 1st district
- In office January 3, 2001 – January 3, 2021
- Preceded by: Bill Clay
- Succeeded by: Cori Bush

Member of the Missouri Senate from the 4th district
- In office September 1991 – January 2001
- Preceded by: John Bass
- Succeeded by: Pat Dougherty

Member of the Missouri House of Representatives from the 59th district
- In office November 1983 – September 1991
- Preceded by: Nat Rivers
- Succeeded by: Frank Williamson

Personal details
- Born: William Lacy Clay Jr. July 27, 1956 (age 70) St. Louis, Missouri, U.S.
- Party: Democratic
- Spouses: Ivie Lewellen (m. 1992; div. 2011); Pat Goncalves (m. 2015)
- Children: 2
- Relatives: Bill Clay (father)
- Education: University of Maryland, College Park (BA); Howard University

William Lacy Clay Jr. (born July 27, 1956) is an American politician who served as the U.S. representative from Missouri's 1st congressional district from 2001 to 2021. His congressional career ended after he lost in a Democratic primary to Cori Bush in 2020, after successfully defeating her in the 2018 primary.

The district Clay represented is based in the city of St. Louis and includes most of northern St. Louis County (North County), including the cities of Maryland Heights, University City, Ferguson and Florissant.

== Early life and education ==
William Lacy Clay Jr. was born on July 27, 1956, in St. Louis, Missouri. His family moved to Washington, D.C., when his father, Bill Clay, was elected to Congress. His mother was Carol Ann (née Johnson).

In his teenage years, Clay attended public schools in Silver Spring, Maryland, and graduated from Springbrook High School in 1974. He subsequently attended the University of Maryland, College Park, earning a degree in political science and a paralegal certificate. Clay is a member of Kappa Alpha Psi fraternity. He attended Howard University School of Law, worked as an Assistant Doorkeeper of the United States House of Representatives, and worked on his father's Congressional campaigns.

== Missouri Legislature ==
Clay entered the Missouri House of Representatives in 1983, winning a special election to complete the term of Nathaniel J. "Nat" Rivers. In 1991, he was elected to the Missouri Senate.

== U.S. House of Representatives ==
In 2000, Bill Clay announced his retirement after 32 years in Congress. His son, Lacy Clay, faced a three-way Democratic primary to succeed his father. Clay Jr. prevailed with 62% of the vote. He breezed to victory in the general election. He was reelected nine times, winning Democratic primaries by an average margin of 30 points. In ten general elections, Clay Jr. has received an average of 73.5% of the general election vote.

For his first six terms, Clay represented the northern two-thirds of St. Louis, while the southern third was in Missouri's 3rd congressional district, represented by Russ Carnahan. After Missouri lost a congressional district as a result of the 2010 census, the final map resulted in the 3rd district being eliminated and the 1st district absorbing all of St. Louis, a decision in which then-U.S. Senator Claire McCaskill said Clay was involved for his self-interest. Clay beat Carnahan in the August 7, 2012, primary, 63% to 34%.

In the 2018 Democratic primary, he defeated Cori Bush, a Justice Democrat, and two other challengers with 56.7% of the vote. In the general election, Clay beat Republican Robert Vroman with 80% of the vote.

In the 2020 Democratic primary, he lost to Bush, with 45% of the vote to her 48%.

=== Committee assignments ===
- Committee on Financial Services
  - Subcommittee on Housing, Community Development and Insurance (Chairman)
- United States House Committee on Oversight and Reform
  - United States House Natural Resources Committee

=== Caucus memberships ===
- Congressional Black Caucus
- Congressional Progressive Caucus
- United States Congressional International Conservation Caucus
- Congressional Arts Caucus

=== Capitol painting ===
In January 2017, Clay argued with Republican lawmakers over the right to hang a controversial painting in the Capitol building. The winner of an art competition, the painting represents the violent Ferguson unrest of 2014 and ensuing police-community relations in Ferguson, Missouri, depicting police officers as pigs while apprehending suspects. The painting is displayed near the police security checkpoint. Representative Duncan Hunter removed the painting and Clay rehung it. Several Republicans, including Doug Lamborn, Dana Rohrabacher, and Brian Babin, repeatedly removed the painting, and Clay rehung it each time. Clay then attempted to file a complaint with the Capitol Police accusing Hunter of theft. After the Architect of the Capitol ruled that the winning painting had violated the rules of the competition and ordered its permanent removal, Clay sued to overturn the decision, but the suit was dismissed by a federal judge. Clay continued to assert a First Amendment argument on behalf of his young constituent, asking, "How is it possible that we stand for freedom of speech and freedom of expression every place across this country, except the U.S. Capitol?"

=== Federal legislation to curb gun violence ===
In the 116th Congress, Clay introduced HR 3435, the Local Public Health and Safety Protection Act, legislation that would, for the first time at the federal level, give local communities the freedom to enact regulations to curb gun violence without seeking permission from their state legislatures. The legislation grants local control over the issue via the Supremacy Clause of the U.S. Constitution and by tying the law to future public safety grant funding to states from the U.S. Department of Justice. Support across the nation for Clay's bill is growing, with endorsements from Moms Demand Action Against Gun Violence, Newtown Action, Giffords Courage, Brady, and many other gun control advocates.

=== Environment ===
While in his role as a member of the House Natural Resources Committee, Clay was an advocate for renewable energy, acting on climate change, cosponsoring the Green New Deal, protecting National Parks, national seashores, wildlife refuges, forests, and rivers. He was also an outspoken champion for cleaning up hazardous waste sites in largely minority communities, which are often the victims of environmental racism. Clay led the effort to clean up three dangerous, hazardous sites in his district: $5 million for the former St. Louis Army Ammunition Plant in North St. Louis, $33 million for the former Carter Carburetor plant site in North St. Louis, and $266 million for the radiologically contaminated West Lake Landfill Superfund site in Northwest St. Louis County.

== Political positions ==
During Clay's 17 years in the Missouri legislature, he authored Missouri's Hate Crimes Law, which included gender, sexual orientation and sexual identity in the criteria for what constitutes a hate crime.

He was one of the 31 United States Representatives who voted not to count the electoral votes from Ohio in the 2004 presidential election.

Clay voted against the Emergency Economic Stabilization Act of 2008.

Clay is a supporter of the Federal Reserve's program of quantitative easing, claiming it has led to economic recovery after the 2008 financial crisis.

On December 18, 2019, Clay voted for both articles in the first impeachment of Donald Trump.

== Electoral history ==
Missouri 1st Congressional District Democratic Primary, 2000
Party	Candidate	Votes	%
Democratic	William Lacy Clay Jr.	34,398	60.56
Democratic	Charlie Dooley	15,612	27.48
Democratic	Eric Erfan Vickers	3,543	6.24
Democratic	Bill (William C.) Haas	1,602	2.82
Democratic	Steven G. Bailey	1,144	2.01
Democratic	Joe Mondrak	504	0.89
Total votes		56,803	100.0

Missouri 1st Congressional District General Election, 2000
Party	Candidate	Votes	%
Democratic	William Lacy Clay Jr.	149,173	75.21
Republican	Z. Dwight Billingsly	42,730	21.54
Green	Brenda (Ziah) Reddick	3,099	1.56
Libertarian	Tamara A. Millay	2,253	1.14
Reform	Robert Penningroth	1,092	0.55
Total votes		198,347	100.0

Missouri 1st Congressional District Democratic Primary, 2002
Party	Candidate	Votes	%
Democratic	William Lacy Clay Jr. (incumbent)	41,405	74.30
Democratic	Carl E. Harris	14,322	25.70
Total votes		55,727	100.0

Missouri 1st Congressional District General Election, 2002
Party	Candidate	Votes	%
Democratic	William Lacy Clay Jr. (incumbent)	133,946	70.11
Republican	Richard Schwadron	51,755	27.09
Libertarian	Jim Higgins	5,354	2.80
Total votes		191,055	100.0

Missouri 1st Congressional District General Election, 2004
Party	Candidate	Votes	%
Democratic	William Lacy Clay Jr. (incumbent)	213,658	75.29
Republican	Leslie L. Farr II	64,791	22.83
Libertarian	Terry Chadwick	3,937	1.39
Constitution	Robert Rehbein	1,385	0.49
Total votes		283,771	100.0

Missouri 1st Congressional District General Election, 2006
Party	Candidate	Votes	%
Democratic	William Lacy Clay Jr. (incumbent)	141,574	72.89
Republican	Mark J. Byrne	47,893	24.66
Libertarian	Robb E. Cunningham	4,768	2.45
Total votes		194,235	100.0

Missouri 1st Congressional District General Election, 2008
Party	Candidate	Votes	%
Democratic	William Lacy Clay Jr. (incumbent)	242,570	86.86
Libertarian	Robb E. Cunningham	36,700	13.14
Write-in votes	Damien Johnson	7	0.00
Total votes		279,277	100.0

Missouri 1st Congressional District Democratic Primary, 2010
Party	Candidate	Votes	%
Democratic	William Lacy Clay Jr. (incumbent)	37,041	81.25
Democratic	Candice (Britt) Britton	8,546	18.75
Total votes		45,587	100.0

Missouri 1st Congressional District General Election, 2010
Party	Candidate	Votes	%
Democratic	William Lacy Clay Jr. (incumbent)	135,907	73.55
Republican	Robyn Hamlin	43,649	23.62
Libertarian	Julie Stone	5,223	2.83
Total votes		184,779	100.0

Missouri 1st Congressional District Democratic Primary, 2012
Party	Candidate	Votes	%
Democratic	William Lacy Clay Jr. (incumbent)	57,791	63.30
Democratic	Russ Carnahan (incumbent)	30,943	33.89
Democratic	Candice Britton	2,570	2.82
Total votes		91,304	100.0

Missouri 1st Congressional District General Election, 2012
Party	Candidate	Votes	%
Democratic	William Lacy Clay Jr. (incumbent)	267,927	78.67
Republican	Robyn Hamlin	60,832	17.86
Libertarian	Robb E. Cunningham	11,824	3.47
Total votes		340,583	100.0

Missouri 1st Congressional District General Election, 2014
Party	Candidate	Votes	%
Democratic	William Lacy Clay Jr. (incumbent)	119,315	72.98
Republican	Daniel J. Elder	35,273	21.58
Libertarian	Robb E. Cunningham	8,906	5.45
Total votes		163,494	100.0

Missouri 1st Congressional District Democratic Primary, 2016
Party	Candidate	Votes	%
Democratic	William Lacy Clay Jr. (incumbent)	56,139	62.64
Democratic	Maria N. Chappelle-Nadal	24,059	26.85
Democratic	(William) Bill Haas	9,422	10.51
Total votes		89,620	100.0

Missouri 1st Congressional District General Election, 2016
Party	Candidate	Votes	%
Democratic	William Lacy Clay Jr. (incumbent)	236,993	75.48
Republican	Steven G. Bailey	62,714	19.97
Libertarian	Robb E. Cunningham	14,317	4.56
Total votes		314,024	100.0

Missouri 1st Congressional District Democratic Primary, 2018
Party	Candidate	Votes	%
Democratic	William Lacy Clay Jr. (incumbent)	81,812	56.70
Democratic	Cori Bush	53,250	36.91
Democratic	Joshua Shipp	4,974	3.45
Democratic	DeMarco K. Davidson	4,243	2.94
Total votes		144,279	100.0

Missouri 1st Congressional District General Election, 2018
Party	Candidate	Votes	%
Democratic	William Lacy Clay Jr. (incumbent)	219,781	80.10
Republican	Robert Vroman	45,867	16.72
Libertarian	Robb E. Cunningham	8,727	3.18
Total votes		274,375	100.0

Missouri 1st Congressional District Democratic Primary, 2020
Party	Candidate	Votes	%
Democratic	Cori Bush	73,274	48.52
Democratic	William Lacy Clay Jr. (incumbent)	68,887	45.61
Democratic	Katherine Bruckner	8,850	5.86
Total votes		151,011	100.0

== Personal life ==
Clay married his first wife, Ivie, in 1992, when he was a state senator. He filed for divorce in 2009. Ivie initially found out about the divorce "only through the media." Through her lawyer, she stated: "“I and my children are devastated and embarrassed that my husband let us find out from the children’s friends and the media that he had filed for divorce, and mostly that he still has not contacted our children. I would have wanted to prepare the children." The divorce was finalized in 2011.

Clay later married Patricia Beauchemin, a nonprofit executive. He is the father of two children, Carol and William III. Clay and his wife reside in University City, St. Louis County.

He is Catholic.

== See also ==
- List of African-American United States representatives

U.S. House of Representatives
Preceded by Bill Clay	Member of the U.S. House of Representatives from Missouri's 1st congressional district 2001–2021	Succeeded by Cori Bush
U.S. order of precedence (ceremonial)
Preceded by Don Manzullo as Former U.S. Representative	Order of precedence of the United States as Former U.S. Representative	Succeeded by Bill McCollum as Former U.S. Representative
