= Missouri's congressional districts =

Congressional districts in Missouri

Map of Missouri's congressional districts from 2023 Interactive map version

Map of Missouri's congressional districts as passed by the Governor of Missouri on September 28, 2025, and was intended to be used for the 2026 elections, but will instead be put to a veto referendum that year to determine if it should be used in the 2028 elections. Interactive map version

The state of Missouri is currently divided into eight congressional districts, with each one being represented by a member of the United States House of Representatives. The current dean of the Missouri delegation is Representative Sam Graves (MO-6) of the Republican Party. He has served in the House since 2001.

Due to the 2010 census, Missouri lost a congressional seat in 2013. The biggest impact has been in the 3rd congressional district, which includes portions of St. Louis that had undergone large population losses in the census. The district effectively became part of the 1st district. The largely rural 9th district, which also suffered population decreases and was dissolved as well, became part of the 6th district north of the Missouri River as well as part of a redrawn more rural 3rd district south of the river.

After the 2020 census, the number of congressional districts stayed the same.

== Current districts and representatives ==
This is a list of United States representatives from Missouri, their terms, their district boundaries, and the district political ratings according to the CPVI. The delegation in the 118th United States Congress has a total of 8 members, including 6 Republicans and 2 Democrats.

Current U.S. representatives from Missouri
District	Member (Residence)	Party	Incumbent since	CPVI (2026)	District map
1st	Wesley Bell (Clayton)	Democratic	January 3, 2025	D+29	
2nd	Ann Wagner (Ballwin)	Republican	January 3, 2013	R+4	
3rd	Bob Onder (Lake St. Louis)	Republican	January 3, 2025	R+13	
4th	Mark Alford (Lake Winnebago)	Republican	January 3, 2023	R+21	
5th	Emanuel Cleaver (Kansas City)	Democratic	January 3, 2005	D+12	
6th	Sam Graves (Tarkio)	Republican	January 3, 2001	R+19	
7th	Eric Burlison (Ozark)	Republican	January 3, 2023	R+21	
8th	Jason Smith (Salem)	Republican	June 4, 2013	R+27	

== Historical and present district boundaries ==
Table of United States congressional district boundary maps in the State of Missouri, presented chronologically. All redistricting events that took place in Missouri between 1973 and 2013 are shown.

Year	Statewide map	St. Louis highlight
1973–1982		
1983–1992		
1993–2002		
2003–2013		
2013–2023		

== Obsolete districts ==
The following list includes districts which are no longer in use in Missouri, due to Missouri's decrease in population relative to the United States at large in recent times.

- Missouri's 9th congressional district, obsolete since the 2010 census
- Missouri's 10th congressional district, obsolete since the 1980 census
- Missouri's 11th congressional district, obsolete since the 1960 census
- Missouri's 12th congressional district, obsolete since the 1950 census
- Missouri's 13th congressional district, obsolete since the 1950 census
- Missouri's 14th congressional district, obsolete since the 1930 census
- Missouri's 15th congressional district, obsolete since the 1930 census
- Missouri's 16th congressional district, obsolete since the 1930 census
- Missouri's at-large congressional seat, obsolete since 3 January 1935
- Missouri Territory's at-large congressional seat, obsolete since statehood in 1821

== See also ==
- List of United States congressional districts
- Historical maps from The Columbia Missourian
