= 2012 United States Senate election in Missouri =

- November 6, 2012
- Turnout: 64.75%
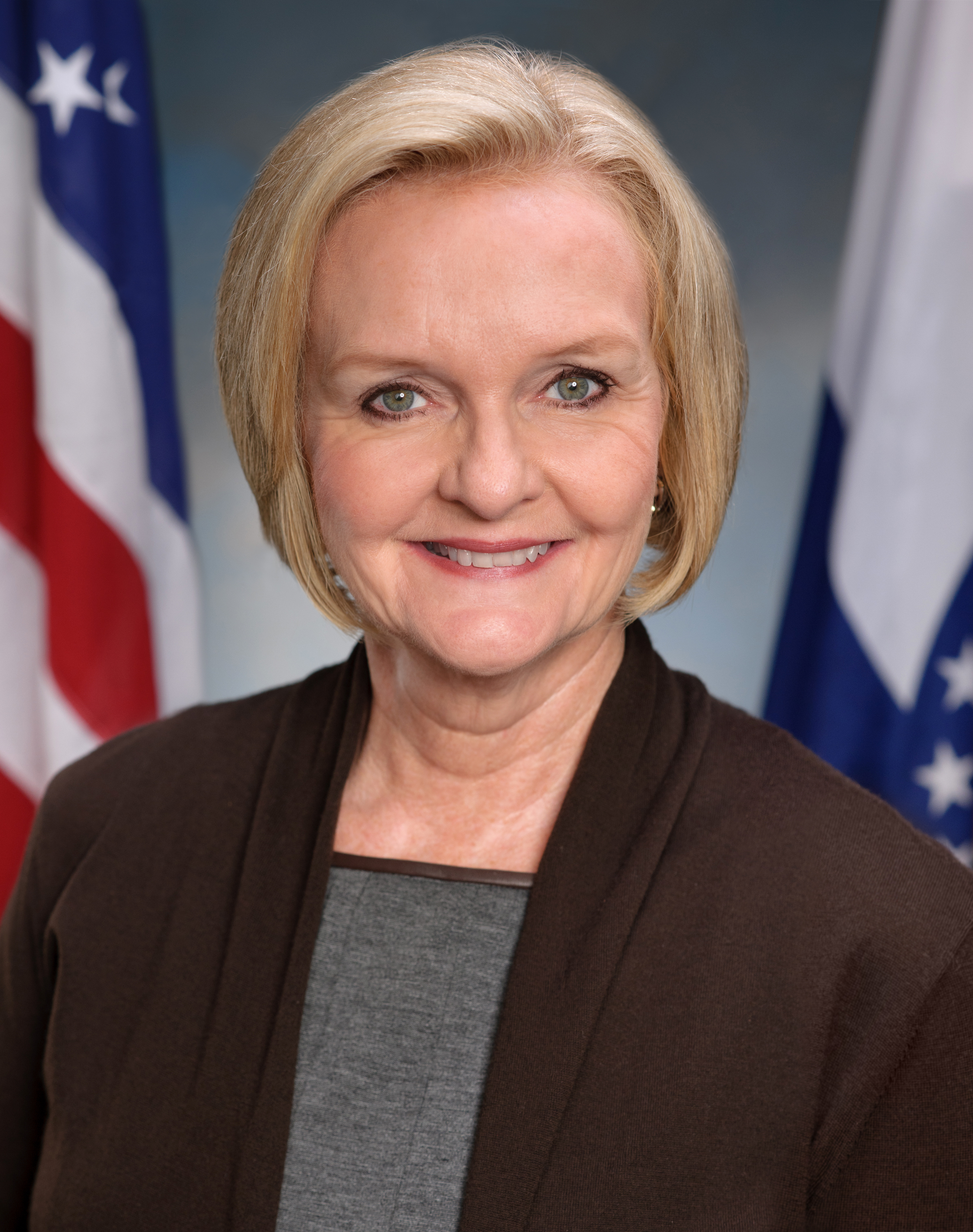

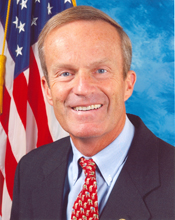

Nominee	Claire McCaskill	Todd Akin	Jonathan Dine
Party	Democratic	Republican	Libertarian
Popular vote	1,494,125	1,066,159	165,468
Percentage	54.81%	39.11%	6.07%
- McCaskill: 40–50% 50–60% 60–70% 70–80% 80–90% >90% Akin: 40–50% 50–60% 60–70% 70–80% Tie: 40–50%
U.S. senator before election
Claire McCaskill
Democratic
Elected U.S. Senator
Claire McCaskill
Democratic

The 2012 United States Senate election in Missouri was held on November 6, 2012, concurrently with the 2012 presidential election, elections to the United States Senate in other states, elections to the United States House of Representatives, and various state and local elections.

Incumbent senator Claire McCaskill was unopposed in the Democratic primary, and U.S. Representative Todd Akin won the Republican nomination with a plurality in a close three-way race. McCaskill's campaign purposely elevated Akin's chances in the primary, under the belief he would be the easiest candidate to defeat in the general election, due to his extreme views on social issues and strong religious views.

Years prior, many forecasters had considered McCaskill to be the most vulnerable Democratic senator seeking re-election in 2012, due to her low approval ratings and the state's rightward trend, with most analysts expecting a Republican pick-up. However, this election received considerable media coverage, due to controversial comments made by the eventual Republican nominee, Akin, most notably his claim that women could not get pregnant from rape. This led most analysts to reclassify the race as a "toss-up", and caused many major Republican Party figures to rescind their endorsements, demand Akin withdraw from the election, and cut off fundraising.

Throughout most of the fall, the race continued to trend in McCaskill's favor and was reclassified as a likely Democratic hold.

McCaskill handily won a second term, with backlash against Akin from women, particularly suburban white women, being cited as the main reason. This marked the first time where an incumbent senator was reelected to Missouri's Class 1 seat since 1988. As of 2026, this was the last time the Democrats won a U.S. Senate election in Missouri.

== Background ==
In 2006, Claire McCaskill was elected with 49.6% of the vote, narrowly defeating Republican incumbent Jim Talent.

== Democratic primary ==
Incumbent senator Claire McCaskill ran unopposed in the Democratic primary election.

=== Candidates ===
==== Nominee ====
- Claire McCaskill, incumbent U.S. senator

=== Results ===
Democratic primary results
Party	Candidate	Votes	%
Democratic	Claire McCaskill (incumbent)	289,481	100.00
Total votes		289,481	100.00

== Republican primary ==
The Republican primary election for the United States Senate in Missouri, held on August 7, 2012, was one of the three most anticipated of the summer of 2012. This was due to the projected closeness of the federal races in Missouri in November 2012, and the potential to change the control of the Senate in January 2013. Democrats believed that Todd Akin would be the weakest among the likely challengers for the Senate seat, and ads attacking him as "too conservative" were largely viewed as veiled support for his nomination. In McCaskill's memoir, she revealed that she also influenced the Akin campaign by providing polling information, which some election law experts later felt was a violation of regulations against coordination.

=== Candidates ===
==== Nominee ====
- Todd Akin, U.S. representative

==== Eliminated in primary ====
- Jerry Beck
- John Brunner, businessman
- Mark Lodes
- Hector Maldonado
- Mark Memoly, author and businessman
- Robert Poole
- Sarah Steelman, former state treasurer, former state senator and candidate for governor in 2008

==== Declined ====
- Jo Ann Emerson, U.S. representative
- Sam Graves, U.S. representative
- Peter Kinder, lieutenant governor (running for reelection)
- Blaine Luetkemeyer, U.S. representative
- Ed Martin, attorney (running for Missouri attorney general)
- Tom Schweich, state auditor
- Jim Talent, former U.S. senator
- Ann Wagner, former U.S. Ambassador to Luxembourg and former Missouri Republican Party chairwoman (running for Congress)

=== Endorsements ===
Todd Akin

Individuals

- Congresswoman Michele Bachmann, 2012 presidential candidate (R-MN)
- Congressman Jeb Hensarling, vice chair of Committee on Financial Services (R-TX)
- State Representative Kurt Bahr
- Mike Huckabee, former governor of Arkansas and 2008 presidential candidate
- Congressman Jim Jordan, chair of Republican Study Committee (R-OH)
- Congressman Steve King (R-IA)
- Phyllis Schlafly, president of Eagle Forum
- Congressman Pete Sessions (R-TX)
John Brunner

Individuals

- August Busch III, former chairman of Anheuser-Busch
- U.S. senator Tom Coburn (Oklahoma)
- U.S. senator Ron Johnson (Wisconsin)

Organizations

- FreedomWorks
- John Deere
- Missouri Pork Association
- Missouri Soybean Association
- United States Chamber of Commerce
Sarah Steelman

Individuals

- Rep. Jay Barnes (Jefferson City)
- Rep. T.J. Berry (Kearney)
- Rep. Eric Burlison (Springfield)
- Rep. Steve Cookson (Fairdealing)
- Rep. Sandy Crawford (Buffalo)
- Jane Cunningham, state senator
- Rep. David Day (Dixon)
- Rep. Charlie Denison (Springfield)
- Rep. Tonny Dugger (Hartfield)
- Rep. Kevin Elmer (Nixa)
- Rep. Paul Fitzwater (Potosi)
- Rep. Diane Franklin (Camdenton)
- Rep. Ward Franz (West Plains)
- Rep. Keith Frederick (Rolla)
- Rep. Jeff Grisamore (Lee's Summit)
- Rep. Casey Guernsey (Bethany)
- Rep. Kent Hampton (Malden)
- Rep. Galen Higdon (St. Joseph)
- Rep. Dave Hinson (St. Clair)
- Rep. Denny Hoskins (Warrensburg)
- Rep. Lincoln Hough (Springfield)
- Rep. Caleb Jones (California)
- Rep. Delus Johnson (St. Joseph)
- Rep. Shelley Keeney (Marble Hill)
- Rep. Mike Lair (Chillicothe)
- Rep. Bill Lant (Joplin)
- Rep. Scott Largent (Clinton)
- Rep. Mike Leara (St. Louis)
- U.S. Senator Mike Lee (Utah)
- Rep. Donna Lichtenegger (Jackson)
- Rep. Tom Loehner (Koeltztown)
- Rep. Thomas Long (Battlefield)
- Rep. Mike McGhee (Odessa)
- Rep. Chris Molendorp (Belton)
- Rep. Myron Neth (Liberty)
- Former Alaska governor Sarah Palin
- Rep. Don Phillips (Kimberling City)
- Rep. Darrell Pollock (Lebanon)
- Rep. Craig Redmon (Canton)
- Rep. Lyle Rowland (Cedar Creek)
- Rep. Don Ruzicka (Mount Vernon)
- Rep. Jason Smith (Salem)
- Rep. Sheila Solon (Blue Springs)
- Rep. Mike Thomson (Maryville)
- Rep. Steven Tilley, speaker of the Missouri House of Representatives
- Rep. Noel Torpey (Independence)
- Rep. Don Wells (Cabool)
- Rep. Ray Weter (Nixa)
- Rep. Billy Pat Wright (Dexter)
- Rep. Anne Zerr (St. Charles)

Organizations

- Tea Party Express
- Susan B. Anthony List

=== Polling ===
Poll source	Date(s) administered	Sample size	Margin of error	Todd Akin	John Brunner	Sarah Steelman	Undecided
Public Policy Polling	September 9–12, 2011	400	±4.9%	29%	6%	40%	26%
Public Policy Polling	January 27–29, 2012	574	±4.1%	23%	18%	32%	28%
Public Policy Polling	May 24–27, 2012	430	±4.7%	23%	25%	28%	20%
Mason-Dixon	July 23–25, 2012	400	±5.0%	17%	33%	27%	19%
Public Policy Polling	August 4–5, 2012	590	±4.0%	30%	35%	25%	8%

=== Results ===
Republican primary results by county Akin: 30–40%; 40–50%; 50–60%; Brunner: 30–40%; 40–50%; Steelman: 30–40%; 40–50%; 50–60%; 60–70%; Tied: 30–40%

Republican primary results
Party	Candidate	Votes	%
Republican	Todd Akin	217,404	36.05
Republican	John Brunner	180,788	29.98
Republican	Sarah Steelman	176,127	29.20
Republican	Jerry Beck	9,801	1.62
Republican	Hector Maldonado	7,410	1.23
Republican	Robert Poole	6,100	1.01
Republican	Mark Memoly	3,205	0.53
Republican	Mark Lodes	2,285	0.38
Total votes		603,120	100.00

== Libertarian primary ==
Jonathan Dine ran unopposed in the Libertarian primary election.

=== Candidates ===
- Jonathan Dine, personal trainer and nominee for the U.S. Senate in 2010

=== Results ===
Libertarian primary results
Party	Candidate	Votes	%
Libertarian	Jonathan Dine	2,470	100.00
Total votes		2,470	100.00

== General election ==
=== Candidates ===
- Todd Akin (Republican), U.S. representative
- Jonathan Dine (Libertarian), personal trainer
- Claire McCaskill (Democratic), incumbent U.S. senator

=== Debates ===
The first debate was held on September 21 in Columbia, Missouri and was sponsored by the Missouri Press Association. Topics discussed by the three candidates included the Affordable Care Act, the future of the U.S. Postal Service, the rapid rise of college tuition, and Representative Akin's controversial comments on rape.

The second and final debate was held October 18 in St. Louis. It was sponsored by the Clayton Chamber of Commerce and hosted by television station KSDK, public radio station KWMU, and the St. Louis Business Journal.

External links

- Complete video of debate, September 21, 2012 - C-SPAN
- Complete video of debate, October 18, 2012 - C-SPAN

=== Rape and pregnancy controversy ===
While making remarks on rape and abortion on August 19, 2012, Akin made the claim that female victims of what he described as "legitimate rape" rarely experience pregnancy from rape. In an interview aired on St. Louis television station KTVI-TV, Akin was asked his views on whether women who became pregnant due to rape should have the option of abortion. He replied:

Well you know, people always want to try to make that as one of those things, well how do you, how do you slice this particularly tough sort of ethical question. First of all, from what I understand from doctors, that's really rare. If it's a legitimate rape, the female body has ways to try to shut that whole thing down. But let's assume that maybe that didn’t work or something. I think there should be some punishment, but the punishment ought to be on the rapist and not attacking the child.

The comments from Akin almost immediately led to an uproar, with the term "legitimate rape" being taken to imply belief in a view that some kinds of rape are "legitimate", or, alternatively, that victims who do become pregnant from rape are likely to be lying about their claims. His claims about the likelihood of pregnancy resulting from rape were widely seen as being based on long-discredited pseudoscience, with experts seeing the claims as lacking medical validity. Akin was not the first to make such claims, but was perhaps one of the most prominent. While some voices such as Iowa Congressman Steve King supported Akin, senior figures in both parties condemned his remarks and called for him to resign. Akin apologized after making the comment, saying he "misspoke", and he stated he planned to remain in the Senate race. This response was itself attacked by many commentators who saw the initial comments as representative of his long-held views, rather than an accidental gaffe.

The comment was widely characterized as misogynistic and recklessly inaccurate, with many commentators remarking on the use of the words "legitimate rape". Related news articles cited a 1996 article in an obstetrics and gynecology journal, which found that 5% of women who were raped became pregnant, which equaled about 32,000 pregnancies each year in the US alone. A separate 2003 article in the journal Human Nature estimated that rapes are twice as likely to result in pregnancies as consensual sex. (See also pregnancy from rape.)

The incident was seen as having an impact upon the Republicans' chances of gaining a majority in the U.S. Senate by making news in the week before the 2012 Republican National Convention and by "shift[ing] the national discussion to divisive social issues that could repel swing voters rather than economic issues that could attract them" to the Republican Party. Akin, along with other Republican candidates with controversial positions on rape, lost due to backlash from women voters.

=== Other controversies ===
On October 20, at a fundraiser, Akin compared McCaskill to a dog. After being criticized, Akin's campaign aide wrote on his official Twitter page that if Claire McCaskill "were a dog, she’d be a ‘Bullshitsu.’" The aide later said that he was joking. Akin was caught on tape commenting that "Sen. Claire McCaskill goes to Washington, D.C., to ‘fetch' higher taxes and regulations."

=== Fundraising ===
Candidate (party)	Receipts	Disbursements	Cash on hand	Debt
Claire McCaskill (D)	$10,250,644	$7,689,961	$3,465,846	$0
Todd Akin (R)	$2,229,189	$2,229,754	$531,559	$0
Source: Federal Election Commission

==== Top contributors ====
Claire McCaskill	Contribution	Todd Akin	Contribution
EMILY's List	$261,390	Emerson	$41,700
Simmons Cooper LLC	$83,225	Crawford Group	$32,750
Express Scripts	$81,358	Edward Jones Investments	$23,000
Bryan Cave LLP	$79,245	American Pulverizer Co	$20,000
Husch Blackwell	$70,525	Murray Energy	$18,605
Washington University in St. Louis	$56,510	Essex Industries	$18,000
Hallmark Cards	$52,000	General Dynamics	$18,000
Boeing	$50,500	Washington University in St. Louis	$17,000
Crawford Group	$47,050	Boeing	$15,700
Polsinelli Shughart PC	$45,250	Patriot Machine	$15,000
Source: OpenSecrets

==== Top industries ====
Claire McCaskill	Contribution	Todd Akin	Contribution
Lawyers/law firms	$1,929,339	Retired	$234,936
Retired	$626,456	Leadership PACs	$126,340
Women's issues	$556,681	Health professionals	$120,050
Entertainment industry	$346,715	Defense contractors	$118,900
Financial institutions	$344,960	Manufacturing & distributing	$95,641
Leadership PACs	$335,500	Mining	$65,880
Lobbyists	$279,883	Automotive	$65,790
Real estate	$266,844	Republican/Conservative	$64,125
Business services	$232,175	Electronics manufacturing services	$42,350
Health services/HMOs	$210,533	Financial institutions	$42,250
Source: OpenSecrets

=== Predictions ===
Source	Ranking	As of
The Cook Political Report	Likely D	November 1, 2012
Sabato's Crystal Ball	Lean D	November 5, 2012
Rothenberg Political Report	Likely D	November 2, 2012
Real Clear Politics	Lean D	November 5, 2012

=== Polling ===
Poll source	Date(s) administered	Sample size	Margin of error	Claire McCaskill (D)	Todd Akin (R)	Other	Undecided
Public Policy Polling	March 3–6, 2011	612	±4.0%	45%	44%	—	11%
Public Policy Polling	April 28 – May 1, 2011	555	±3.9%	46%	45%	—	8%
Public Policy Polling	September 9–12, 2011	632	±3.9%	45%	43%	—	12%
Rasmussen Reports	November 9, 2011	500	±4.5%	47%	45%	5%	3%
Public Policy Polling	January 27–29, 2012	582	±4.1%	43%	43%	—	14%
Rasmussen Reports	March 14–15, 2012	500	±4.5%	43%	50%	4%	4%
Rasmussen Reports	April 17, 2012	500	±4.5%	43%	48%	2%	7%
Public Policy Polling	May 24–27, 2012	602	±4.0%	44%	45%	—	11%
Rasmussen Reports	June 7, 2012	500	±4.5%	42%	50%	2%	7%
Mason-Dixon	July 23–25, 2012	625	±4.0%	44%	49%	—	7%
Rasmussen Reports	July 30, 2012	500	±4.5%	44%	47%	4%	5%
Chilenski Strategies/Missouri Scout	August 8, 2012	663	±3.8%	47%	48%	—	6%
Survey USA	August 9–12, 2012	585	±4.1%	40%	51%	4%	5%
August 19, 2012 - Akin makes "legitimate rape" comments on KTVI
Public Policy Polling	August 20, 2012	500	±4.4%	43%	44%	—	13%
Rasmussen Reports	August 22, 2012	500	±4.5%	48%	38%	9%	5%
Mason-Dixon	August 22–23, 2012	625	±4.0%	50%	41%	—	9%
Wenzel Strategies	August 27–28, 2012	829	±3.3%	42%	45%	—	13%
Public Policy Polling	August 28–29, 2012	621	±3.9%	45%	44%	—	11%
Rasmussen Reports	September 11, 2012	500	±4.5%	49%	43%	4%	4%
Wenzel Strategies	September 10–11, 2012	850	±3.3%	43%	48%	—	10%
Gravis Marketing	September 15–16, 2012	1,959	±2.3%	42%	44%	—	16%
We Ask America	September 25–27, 2012	1,145	±2.9%	46%	45%	—	9%
Kiley & Company	September 30, 2012	600	±3.5%	50%	41%	2%	7%
Public Policy Polling	October 1–3, 2012	700	±3.7%	46%	40%	9%	5%
Rasmussen Reports	October 3, 2012	500	±4.5%	51%	45%	1%	3%
Wenzel Strategies	October 12–13, 2012	1,000	±3.7%	45%	49%	—	7%
Rasmussen Reports	October 19, 2012	500	±4.5%	51%	43%	3%	3%
Public Policy Polling	October 19–21, 2012	582	±4.1%	46%	40%	6%	8%
Mason-Dixon	October 23–25, 2012	625	±4%	45%	43%	—	8%
WeAskAmerica	October 30, 2012	1,217	±2.9%	49%	45%	6%	—
SurveyUSA	October 28 – November 3, 2012	589	±4.1%	51%	36%	8%	5%
Public Policy Polling	November 2–3, 2012	835	±3.4%	48%	44%	6%	2%

Hypothetical polling

Republican primary

Poll source	Date(s) administered	Sample size	Margin of error	Todd Akin	John Brunner	Blaine Luetkemeyer	Ed Martin	Sarah Steelman	Other/ Undecided
Public Policy Polling	April 28 – May 1, 2011	400	±4.9%	23%	4%	18%	6%	27%	23%

Poll source	Date(s) administered	Sample size	Margin of error	Todd Akin	John Brunner	Ed Martin	Sarah Steelman	Other/ Undecided
Public Policy Polling	April 28 – May 1, 2011	400	±4.9%	29%	6%	9%	28%	28%

General election

Poll source	Date(s) administered	Sample size	Margin of error	Claire McCaskill (D)	John Brunner (R)	Other	Undecided
Public Policy Polling	April 28 – May 1, 2011	555	±3.9%	47%	41%	—	12%
Public Policy Polling	September 9–12, 2011	632	±3.9%	46%	37%	—	17%
Public Policy Polling	January 27–29, 2012	582	±4.1%	43%	43%	–	14%
Rasmussen Reports	March 14–15, 2012	500	±4.5%	42%	49%	4%	6%
Rasmussen Reports	April 17, 2012	500	±4.5%	45%	45%	3%	7%
Public Policy Polling	May 24–27, 2012	602	±4.0%	46%	44%	—	11%
Rasmussen Reports	June 7, 2012	500	±4.5%	41%	51%	2%	6%
Mason-Dixon	July 23–25, 2012	625	±4.0%	41%	52%	—	7%
Rasmussen Reports	July 30, 2012	500	±4.5%	43%	49%	5%	3%

Poll source	Date(s) administered	Sample size	Margin of error	Claire McCaskill (D)	Peter Kinder (R)	Other	Undecided
Public Policy Polling	November 29 – December 1, 2010	515	±4.3%	44%	46%	—	10%

Poll source	Date(s) administered	Sample size	Margin of error	Claire McCaskill (D)	Blaine Luetkemeyer (R)	Other	Undecided
Public Policy Polling	April 28 – May 1, 2011	555	±3.9%	45%	42%	—	13%

Poll source	Date(s) administered	Sample size	Margin of error	Claire McCaskill (D)	Ed Martin (R)	Other	Undecided
Public Policy Polling	March 3–6, 2011	612	±4.0%	46%	40%	—	14%
Public Policy Polling	April 28 – May 1, 2011	555	±3.9%	46%	39%	—	15%

Poll source	Date(s) administered	Sample size	Margin of error	Claire McCaskill (D)	Tom Schweich (R)	Other	Undecided
Rasmussen Reports	March 14–15, 2012	500	±4.5%	43%	47%	4%	6%

Poll source	Date(s) administered	Sample size	Margin of error	Claire McCaskill (D)	Sarah Steelman (R)	Other	Undecided
Public Policy Polling	November 29 – December 1, 2010	515	±4.3%	45%	44%	—	12%
Public Policy Polling	March 3–6, 2011	612	±4.0%	45%	42%	—	14%
Public Policy Polling	April 28 – May 1, 2011	555	±3.9%	45%	42%	—	14%
Public Policy Polling	September 9–12, 2011	632	±3.9%	43%	42%	—	16%
Rasmussen Reports	November 9, 2011	500	±4.5%	45%	47%	3%	4%
Public Policy Polling	January 27–29, 2012	582	±4.1%	43%	44%	–	13%
Rasmussen Reports	March 14–15, 2012	500	±4.5%	41%	51%	4%	4%
Rasmussen Reports	April 17, 2012	500	±4.5%	42%	49%	2%	6%
Public Policy Polling	May 24–27, 2012	602	±4.0%	44%	44%	—	12%
Rasmussen Reports	June 7, 2012	500	±4.5%	39%	51%	3%	7%
Mason-Dixon	July 23–25, 2012	625	±4.0%	41%	49%	—	10%
Rasmussen Reports	July 30, 2012	500	±4.5%	43%	49%	4%	4%

Poll source	Date(s) administered	Sample size	Margin of error	Claire McCaskill (D)	Jim Talent (R)	Other	Undecided
Public Policy Polling	November 29 – December 1, 2010	515	±4.3%	45%	47%	—	8%

Poll source	Date(s) administered	Sample size	Margin of error	Claire McCaskill (D)	Ann Wagner (R)	Other	Undecided
Public Policy Polling	March 3–6, 2011	612	±4.0%	45%	36%	—	19%

=== Results ===
Even though the last poll before the election showed Akin only losing by four percentage points, McCaskill defeated him handily, by a 15.7% margin of victory and a vote margin of 427,966. Both McCaskill and incumbent governor Jay Nixon, running at the same time, were able to get a large number of votes from rural parts of the state, something President Barack Obama was not able to do. McCaskill and Nixon were declared the winners of their respective races even before results from the known big Democratic strongholds of St. Louis and Kansas City came in. Akin conceded defeat to McCaskill at 10:38 P.M. Central Time.

Time featured the race in an article on the Senate. The article mentioned that McCaskill had been fading in pre-election polls, and that she was considered the most vulnerable/endangered Democratic incumbent in 2012. However, Akin's controversial comments helped McCaskill rise in the polls and propelled her to a victory in the election. In August 2015, McCaskill penned a Politico article in which she stated that in 2012, she had "successfully manipulated the Republican primary so that in the general election [she] would face the candidate [she] was most likely to beat."

United States Senate election in Missouri, 2012
Party	Candidate	Votes	%	±%
Democratic	Claire McCaskill (incumbent)	1,494,125	54.81%	+5.36%
Republican	Todd Akin	1,066,159	39.11%	−8.20%
Libertarian	Jonathan Dine	165,468	6.07%	+3.83%
Write-in		41	0.01%	+0.01%
Total votes		2,725,793	100.00%	N/A
Democratic hold				

==== Counties that flipped from Republican to Democratic ====
- Andrew (largest city: Savannah)
- Audrain (largest city: Mexico)
- Worth (largest city: Grant City)
- Chariton (largest city: Salisbury)
- Livingston (largest city: Chillicothe)
- Bates (largest city: Butler)
- Gentry (largest city: Albany)
- Nodaway (largest city: Maryville)
- Lafayette (largest city: Odessa)
- Pettis (largest city: Sedalia)
- Sullivan (largest city: Milan)
- Clark (largest city: Kahoka)
- Cass (largest city: Harrisonville)
- Daviess (largest city: Gallatin)
- Knox (largest city: Edina)
- Lewis (largest city: Canton)
- Grundy (largest city: Trenton)
- Johnson (largest city: Warrensburg)
- Howard (largest city: Fayette)
- Schuyler (largest city: Lancaster)
- Scotland (largest city: Memphis)
- Dunklin (largest city: Kennett)
- Madison (largest city: Fredericktown)
- Pulaski (largest city: Fort Leonard Wood)
- Greene (largest city: Springfield)
- Franklin (largest city: Washington)
- Wayne (largest city: Piedmont)

==== Counties that flipped from Democratic to Republican ====
- Oregon (largest city: Thayer)

==== By congressional district ====
McCaskill won six of eight congressional districts, four of which were won by Republicans, including Akin's own district.

District	McCaskill	Akin	Representative
1st	86.93%	13.22%	Lacy Clay
2nd	51.97%	42.77%	Todd Akin (112th Congress)
2nd	51.97%	42.77%	Ann Wagner (113th Congress)
3rd	47.02%	46.49%	Russ Carnahan (112th Congress)
3rd	47.02%	46.49%	Blaine Luetkemeyer (113th Congress)
4th	48.65%	43.28%	Vicky Hartzler
5th	66.48%	27.61%	Emanuel Cleaver
6th	50.72%	41.98%	Sam Graves
7th	41.77%	51.1%	Billy Long
8th	46.3%	47.76%	Jo Ann Emerson

== See also ==
- 2012 United States Senate elections
- 2012 United States House of Representatives elections in Missouri
- 2012 United States presidential election in Missouri
- 2012 Missouri gubernatorial election
- 2012 Missouri lieutenant gubernatorial election
- 2012 Missouri Attorney General election
- 2012 Missouri State Treasurer election
- 2012 Missouri Secretary of State election
