= 2012 United States House of Representatives elections in Missouri =

- November 6, 2012

All 8 Missouri seats to the United States House of Representatives
| | Majority party | Minority party |
|---|---|---|
| Party | Republican | Democratic |
| Last election | 6 | 3 |
| Seats won | 6 | 2 |
| Seat change | Steady | ▼1 |
| Popular vote | 1,463,586 | 1,119,554 |
| Percentage | 54.70% | 41.84% |
| Swing | ▼2.74% | ▲4.97% |

Republican
40–50%
50–60%
60–70%
70–80%
80–90%
Democratic
40–50%
50–60%
60–70%
70–80%
80–90%

The 2012 United States House of Representatives elections in Missouri were held on Tuesday, November 6, 2012, and elected the eight U.S. representatives from the state of Missouri, a loss of one seat following the 2010 United States census. The elections coincided with the elections of other federal and state offices, including a federal quadrennial presidential election, concurrent statewide gubernatorial election, quadrennial statewide lieutenant gubernatorial election, and an election to the U.S. Senate.

== Overview ==
United States House of Representatives elections in Missouri, 2012
| Party | Votes | Percentage | Seats before | Seats after | +/– |
|---|---|---|---|---|---|
| Republican | 1,463,586 | 54.70% | 6 | 6 | - |
| Democratic | 1,119,554 | 41.84% | 3 | 2 | -1 |
| Libertarian | 87,774 | 3.28% | 0 | 0 | - |
| Constitution | 4,971 | 0.19% | 0 | 0 | - |
| Independent | 15 | <0.01% | 0 | 0 | - |
| Total | 2,675,900 | 100.00% | 9 | 8 | — |

== Redistricting ==
A new congressional map was passed by the Missouri General Assembly on April 27, 2011. The map was vetoed by Democratic Governor Jay Nixon on April 30, but Nixon's veto was overridden by the General Assembly on May 4, making the plan law. The map effectively eradicated the former 3rd district, which had been represented by Democrat Russ Carnahan since 2005, splitting it between the districts represented by Republicans Blaine Luetkemeyer and Todd Akin and Democrat William Lacy Clay, Jr. The bulk of the old 9th district became the new 3rd district.

== District 1 ==
2012 Missouri's 1st congressional district election
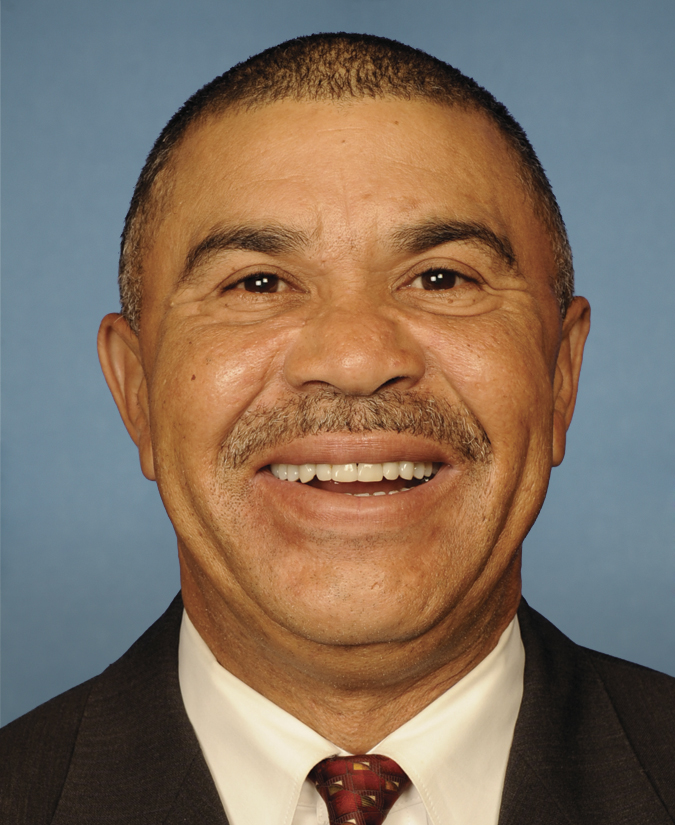

| Nominee | Lacy Clay | Robyn Hamlin |
| Party | Democratic | Republican |
| Popular vote | 267,927 | 60,832 |
| Percentage | 78.7% | 17.9% |
- Clay: 70–80% 80–90%
U.S. Representative before election
Lacy Clay
Democratic
Elected U.S. Representative
Lacy Clay
Democratic

Democrat William Lacy Clay, Jr., who had represented Missouri's 1st congressional district since 2001, ran for re-election.

=== Democratic primary ===
Fellow U.S. Representative Russ Carnahan, part of whose district was drawn into the 1st district, challenged Clay in the Democratic primary.

==== Candidates ====
===== Nominee =====
- William Lacy Clay, Jr., incumbent U.S. representative

===== Eliminated in primary =====
- Candice Britton
- Russ Carnahan, incumbent U.S. representative for the 3rd district

===== Declined =====
- Francis Slay, mayor of St. Louis (endorse Clay)

==== Endorsements ====
Lacy Clay

Local officials

- Francis Slay, mayor of St. Louis

==== Polling ====
| Poll source | Date(s) administered | Sample size | Margin of error | Candice Britton | Russ Carnahan | Lacy Clay | Undecided |
|---|---|---|---|---|---|---|---|
| SurveyUSA | August 2–4, 2012 | 490 (RV) | ± 4.5% | 2% | 35% | 56% | 7% |

==== Primary results ====
Democratic primary results
| Party | Candidate | Votes | % |
|---|---|---|---|
| Democratic | William Lacy Clay, Jr. (incumbent) | 57,791 | 63.3 |
| Democratic | Russ Carnahan (incumbent) | 30,943 | 33.9 |
| Democratic | Candice Britton | 2,570 | 2.8 |
| Total votes | | 91,304 | 100.0 |

=== Republican primary ===
==== Candidates ====
===== Nominee =====
- Robyn Hamlin, insurance agent and nominee for this seat in 2010.

===== Eliminated in primary =====
- Martin Baker, political organizer

==== Primary results ====
Republican primary results
| Party | Candidate | Votes | % |
|---|---|---|---|
| Republican | Robyn Hamlin | 9,737 | 57.9 |
| Republican | Martin D. Baker | 7,085 | 42.1 |
| Total votes | | 16,822 | 100.0 |

=== Libertarian primary ===
==== Candidates ====
===== Nominee =====
- Robb Cunningham, candidate for this seat in 2010

==== Primary results ====
Libertarian primary results
| Party | Candidate | Votes | % |
|---|---|---|---|
| Libertarian | Robb E. Cunningham | 246 | 100.0 |
| Total votes | | 246 | 100.0 |

=== General election ===
==== Polling ====
| Poll source | Date(s) administered | Sample size | Margin of error | Lacy Clay (D) | Robyn Hamlin (R) | Robb Cunningham (L) | Undecided |
|---|---|---|---|---|---|---|---|
| SurveyUSA | August 2–4, 2012 | 950 (RV) | ± 3.2% | 58% | 19% | 6% | 18% |

Hypothetical polling

===== Clay vs Baker =====
| Poll source | Date(s) administered | Sample size | Margin of error | Lacy Clay (D) | Martin Baker (R) | Robb Cunningham (L) | Undecided |
|---|---|---|---|---|---|---|---|
| SurveyUSA | August 2–4, 2012 | 950 (RV) | ± 3.2% | 58% | 18% | 7% | 18% |

===== Carnahan vs Hamlin =====
| Poll source | Date(s) administered | Sample size | Margin of error | Russ Carnahan (D) | Robyn Hamlin (R) | Robb Cunningham (L) | Undecided |
|---|---|---|---|---|---|---|---|
| SurveyUSA | August 2–4, 2012 | 950 (RV) | ± 3.2% | 56% | 18% | 6% | 20% |

===== Carnahan vs Baker =====
| Poll source | Date(s) administered | Sample size | Margin of error | Russ Carnahan (D) | Martin Baker (R) | Robb Cunningham (L) | Undecided |
|---|---|---|---|---|---|---|---|
| SurveyUSA | August 2–4, 2012 | 950 (RV) | ± 3.2% | 56% | 17% | 7% | 20% |

==== Predictions ====
| Source | Ranking | As of |
|---|---|---|
| The Cook Political Report | Safe D | November 5, 2012 |
| Rothenberg | Safe D | November 2, 2012 |
| Roll Call | Safe D | November 4, 2012 |
| Sabato's Crystal Ball | Safe D | November 5, 2012 |
| NY Times | Safe D | November 4, 2012 |
| RCP | Safe D | November 4, 2012 |
| The Hill | Safe D | November 4, 2012 |

==== Results ====
Missouri's 1st congressional district, 2012
| Party | Candidate | Votes | % |
|---|---|---|---|
| Democratic | Lacy Clay (incumbent) | 267,927 | 78.7 |
| Republican | Robyn Hamlin | 60,832 | 17.9 |
| Libertarian | Robb E. Cunningham | 11,824 | 3.5 |
| Total votes | | 340,583 | 100.0 |
| Democratic hold | | | |

== District 2 ==
2012 Missouri's 2nd congressional district election
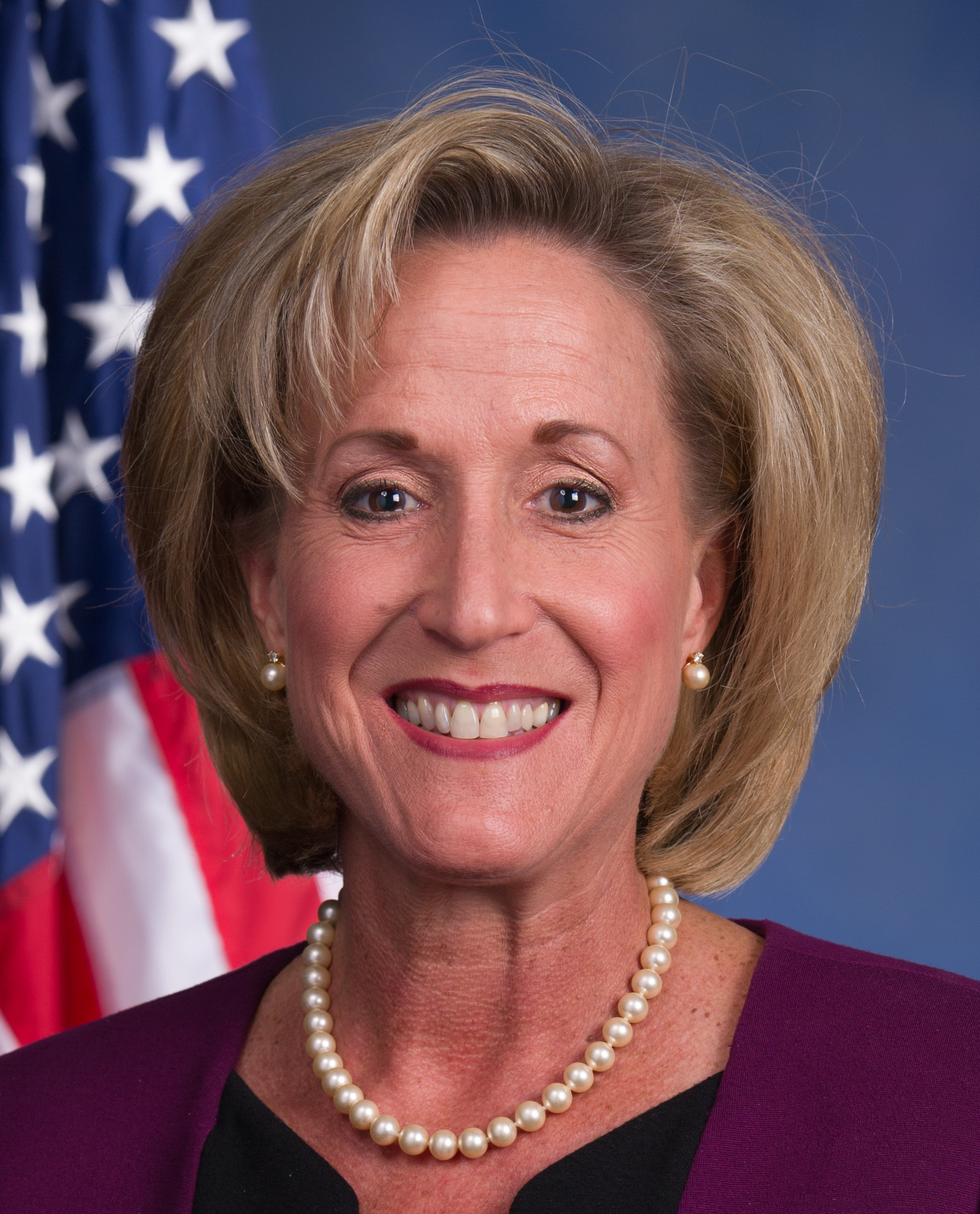

| Nominee | Ann Wagner | Glenn Koenen |
| Party | Republican | Democratic |
| Popular vote | 236,971 | 146,272 |
| Percentage | 60.1% | 37.1% |
- Wagner: 50–60% 60–70%
U.S. Representative before election
Todd Akin
Republican
Elected U.S. Representative
Ann Wagner
Republican

Republican Todd Akin, who had represented Missouri's 2nd congressional district since 2001, chose to run for the U.S. Senate rather than seek re-election.

=== Republican primary ===
==== Candidates ====
===== Nominee =====
- Ann Wagner, former U.S. Ambassador to Luxembourg and former chair of the Missouri Republican Party

===== Eliminated in primary =====
- James Baker, businessman
- Randy Jotte, emergency room physician and former member of the Webster Groves City Council
- John Morris

===== Withdrawn =====
- Ed Martin, lawyer and nominee for the 3rd district in 2010 (running for state attorney general)

===== Declined =====
- Todd Akin, incumbent U.S. representative
- Jane Cunningham, state senator
- Joe Smith, former state representative

==== Primary results ====
Republican primary results
| Party | Candidate | Votes | % |
|---|---|---|---|
| Republican | Ann Wagner | 53,583 | 65.8 |
| Republican | Randy Jotte | 18,644 | 22.9 |
| Republican | John Morris | 6,041 | 7.4 |
| Republican | James O. Baker | 3,185 | 3.9 |
| Total votes | | 81,453 | 100.0 |

=== Democratic primary ===
==== Candidates ====
===== Nominee =====
- Glenn Koenen, non-profit executive

===== Eliminated in primary =====
- George Weber, realtor
- Harold Whitfield, attorney
- Marshall Works, insurance executive

===== Declined =====
- Russ Carnahan, incumbent U.S. representative for the 3rd district

=== Campaign ===
3rd District Congressman Russ Carnahan briefly mulled over a run in this district, though the district was more Republican than his previous district, and he did not live in the district. A poll commissioned by Carnahan showed him being competitive with Ann Wagner and Ed Martin. The Democratic Congressional Campaign Committee had preferred that Carnahan run in the district, and considered him a member of the Frontline program for vulnerable members. Ultimately, he ran unsuccessfully for the 1st district.

==== Primary results ====
Whitfield requested a recount, as the race was separated by less than 1%. By September 13, 2012, the recount was completed and Koenen was declared the winner.

Democratic primary results
| Party | Candidate | Votes | % |
|---|---|---|---|
| Democratic | Glenn Koenen | 7,894 | 28.38 |
| Democratic | Harold Whitfield | 7,848 | 28.22 |
| Democratic | George Weber | 7,541 | 27.11 |
| Democratic | Marshall Works | 4,532 | 16.29 |
| Total votes | | 27,815 | 100.0 |

=== Libertarian primary ===
==== Candidates ====
===== Nominee =====
- Bill Slantz, businessman

=== Constitution primary ===
==== Candidates ====
===== Nominee =====
- Anatol Zorikova, business owner

=== General election ===
==== Endorsements ====
Ann Wagner (R)

Organizations

- Maggie's List
- National Republican Congressional Committee "Vanguard" Program
- Susan B. Anthony List

==== Predictions ====
| Source | Ranking | As of |
|---|---|---|
| The Cook Political Report | Safe R | November 5, 2012 |
| Rothenberg | Safe R | November 2, 2012 |
| Roll Call | Safe R | November 4, 2012 |
| Sabato's Crystal Ball | Safe R | November 5, 2012 |
| NY Times | Safe R | November 4, 2012 |
| RCP | Safe R | November 4, 2012 |
| The Hill | Safe R | November 4, 2012 |

==== Results ====
Missouri's 2nd congressional district, 2012
| Party | Candidate | Votes | % |
|---|---|---|---|
| Republican | Ann Wagner | 236,971 | 60.1 |
| Democratic | Glenn Koenen | 146,272 | 37.1 |
| Libertarian | Bill Slantz | 9,193 | 2.3 |
| Constitution | Anatol Zorikova | 2,012 | 0.5 |
| Total votes | | 394,448 | 100.0 |
| Republican hold | | | |

== District 3 ==
2012 Missouri's 3rd congressional district election
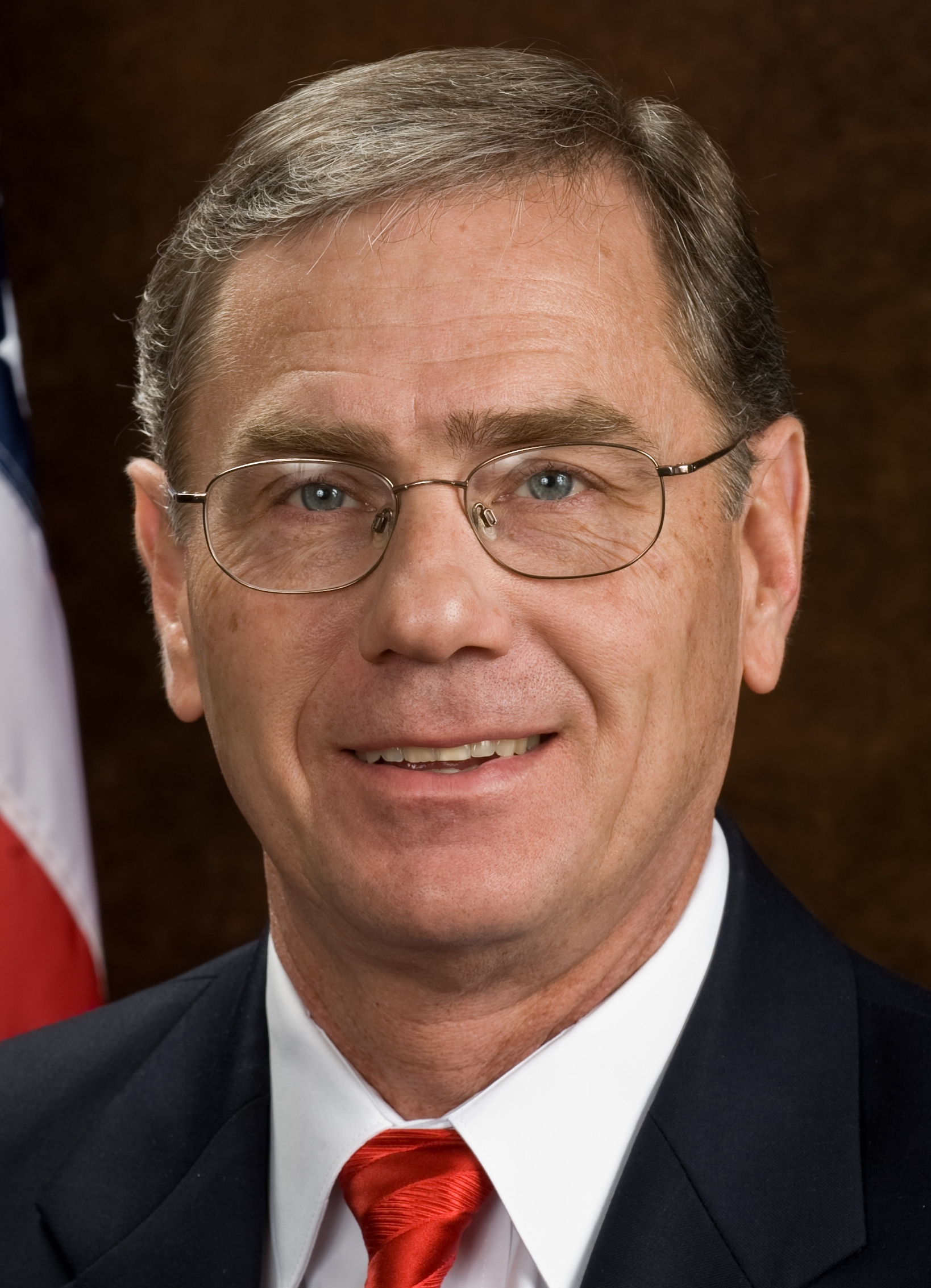

| Nominee | Blaine Luetkemeyer | Eric C. Mayer |
| Party | Republican | Democratic |
| Popular vote | 214,843 | 111,189 |
| Percentage | 63.5% | 32.8% |
- Luetkemeyer: 50–60% 60–70% 70–80% 80–90%
U.S. Representative before election
Blaine Luetkemeyer
Republican
Elected U.S. Representative
Blaine Luetkemeyer
Republican

Republican Blaine Luetkemeyer ran in the reconfigured 3rd district, which includes most of the 9th district he had represented since 2009.

=== Republican primary ===
==== Candidates ====
===== Nominee =====
- Blaine Luetkemeyer, incumbent U.S. representative

==== Primary results ====
Republican primary results
| Party | Candidate | Votes | % |
|---|---|---|---|
| Republican | Blaine Luetkemeyer (incumbent) | 79,661 | 100.0 |
| Total votes | | 79,661 | 100.0 |

=== Democratic primary ===
==== Candidates ====
===== Nominee =====
- Eric Mayer, small business owner from Camdenton

==== Primary results ====
Democratic primary results
| Party | Candidate | Votes | % |
|---|---|---|---|
| Democratic | Eric C. Mayer | 22,478 | 100.0 |
| Total votes | | 22,478 | 100.0 |

=== Libertarian primary ===
==== Candidates ====
===== Nominee =====
- Steven Wilson, commercial artist

==== Primary results ====
Libertarian primary results
| Party | Candidate | Votes | % |
|---|---|---|---|
| Libertarian | Steven Wilson | 367 | 100.0 |
| Total votes | | 367 | 100.0 |

=== Constitution primary ===
==== Candidates ====
===== Declined =====
- Cynthia Davis, former state representative

=== General election ===
==== Predictions ====
| Source | Ranking | As of |
|---|---|---|
| The Cook Political Report | Safe R | November 5, 2012 |
| Rothenberg | Safe R | November 2, 2012 |
| Roll Call | Safe R | November 4, 2012 |
| Sabato's Crystal Ball | Safe R | November 5, 2012 |
| NY Times | Safe R | November 4, 2012 |
| RCP | Safe R | November 4, 2012 |
| The Hill | Safe R | November 4, 2012 |

==== Results ====
Missouri's 3rd congressional district, 2012
| Party | Candidate | Votes | % |
|---|---|---|---|
| Republican | Blaine Luetkemeyer (incumbent) | 214,843 | 63.5 |
| Democratic | Eric C. Mayer | 111,189 | 32.8 |
| Libertarian | Steven Wilson | 12,353 | 3.7 |
| Total votes | | 338,385 | 100.0 |
| Republican hold | | | |

== District 4 ==
2012 Missouri's 4th congressional district election

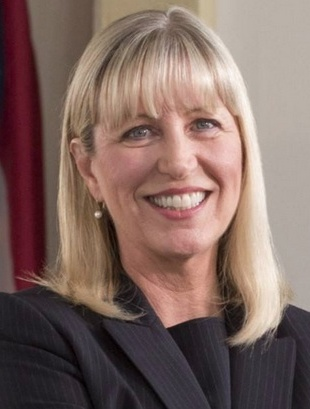
| Nominee | Vicky Hartzler | Teresa Hensley |
| Party | Republican | Democratic |
| Popular vote | 192,237 | 113,120 |
| Percentage | 60.3% | 35.5% |
- Hartzler: 50–60% 60–70% 70–80% Hensley: 40–50%
U.S. Representative before election
Vicky Hartzler
Republican
Elected U.S. Representative
Vicky Hartzler
Republican

Republican Vicky Hartzler, who represented the 4th district since January 2011, sought re-election. In redistricting, all of Boone, Cooper, Howard, and Randolph counties, and parts of Audrain County, were added to the 4th district, while Cole, Lafayette, Ray, and Saline counties were removed from the district.

=== Republican primary ===
==== Candidates ====
===== Nominee =====
- Vicky Hartzler, incumbent U.S. representative

===== Eliminated in primary =====
- Bernie Mowinski, U.S. Air Force veteran

==== Primary results ====
Republican primary results
| Party | Candidate | Votes | % |
|---|---|---|---|
| Republican | Vicky Hartzler (incumbent) | 71,615 | 84.0 |
| Republican | Bernie Mowinski | 13,645 | 16.0 |
| Total votes | | 85,260 | 100.0 |

=== Democratic primary ===
==== Candidates ====
===== Nominee =====
- Teresa Hensley, Cass County prosecuting attorney

==== Primary results ====
Democratic primary results
| Party | Candidate | Votes | % |
|---|---|---|---|
| Democratic | Teresa Hensley | 24,631 | 100.0 |
| Total votes | | 24,631 | 100.0 |

=== Libertarian primary ===
==== Candidates ====
===== Nominee =====
- Thomas Holbrook

===== Eliminated in primary =====
- Herschel Young, small business owner

==== Primary results ====
Libertarian primary results
| Party | Candidate | Votes | % |
|---|---|---|---|
| Libertarian | Thomas Holbrook | 232 | 58.0 |
| Libertarian | Herschel L. Young | 168 | 42.0 |
| Total votes | | 400 | 100.0 |

=== Constitution primary ===
==== Candidates ====
===== Nominee =====
- Greg Cowan, retired Navy lieutenant commander

=== General election ===
==== Endorsements ====
Vicky Hartzler (R)

Organizations

- Maggie's List
- Susan B. Anthony List
Teresa Hensley (D)

Organizations

- Democratic Congressional Campaign Committee "Emerging Races" Program

==== Predictions ====
| Source | Ranking | As of |
|---|---|---|
| The Cook Political Report | Safe R | November 5, 2012 |
| Rothenberg | Safe R | November 2, 2012 |
| Roll Call | Safe R | November 4, 2012 |
| Sabato's Crystal Ball | Safe R | November 5, 2012 |
| NY Times | Safe R | November 4, 2012 |
| RCP | Safe R | November 4, 2012 |
| The Hill | Safe R | November 4, 2012 |

==== Results ====
Missouri's 4th congressional district, 2012
| Party | Candidate | Votes | % |
|---|---|---|---|
| Republican | Vicky Hartzler (incumbent) | 192,237 | 60.3 |
| Democratic | Teresa Hensley | 113,120 | 35.5 |
| Libertarian | Thomas Holbrook | 10,407 | 3.3 |
| Constitution | Greg Cowan | 2,959 | 0.9 |
| Total votes | | 318,723 | 100.0 |
| Republican hold | | | |

== District 5 ==
2012 Missouri's 5th congressional district election
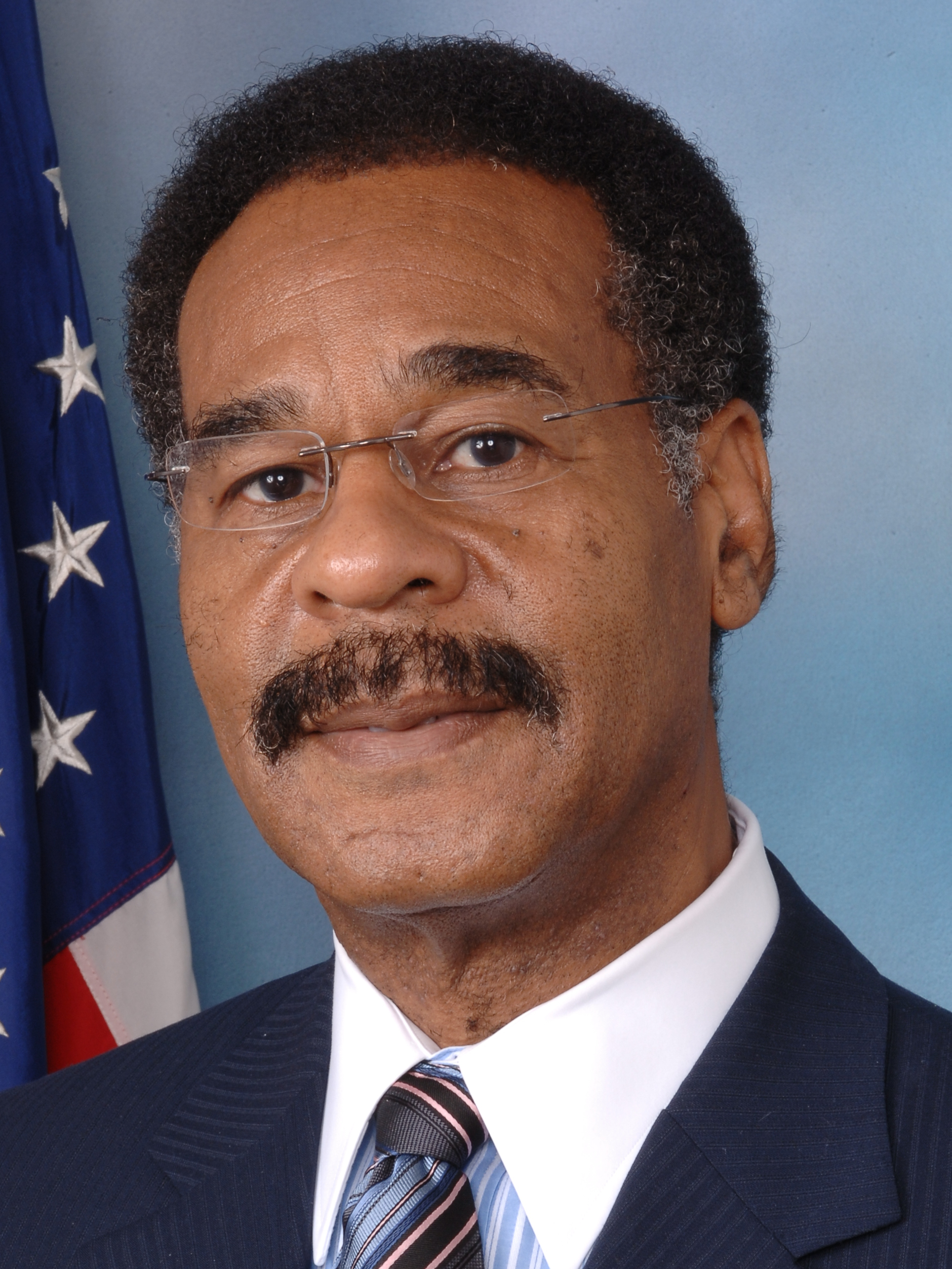

| Nominee | Emanuel Cleaver | Jacob Turk |
| Party | Democratic | Republican |
| Popular vote | 200,290 | 122,149 |
| Percentage | 60.5% | 36.9% |
- Cleaver: 40–50% 50–60% 60–70% Turk: 40–50% 50–60%
U.S. Representative before election
Emanuel Cleaver
Democratic
Elected U.S. Representative
Emanuel Cleaver
Democratic

Missouri's 5th Congressional district was perhaps the one most complicated by redistricting, and the legal challenges that have ensued. Democratic incumbent Emanuel Cleaver successfully won re-election.

=== Democratic primary ===
==== Candidates ====
===== Nominee =====
- Emanuel Cleaver, incumbent U.S. representative

==== Primary results ====
Democratic primary results
| Party | Candidate | Votes | % |
|---|---|---|---|
| Democratic | Emanuel Cleaver (incumbent) | 43,712 | 100.0 |
| Total votes | | 43,712 | 100.0 |

=== Republican primary ===
Republican Jerry Nolte, who at first announced his intention to run in the 6th district, decided to run in the 5th. His residence lay on the court-contested border of the two districts.

==== Candidates ====
===== Nominee =====
- Jacob Turk, Marine Corps veteran and nominee for this seat in 2006, 2008, and 2010

===== Eliminated in primary =====
- Jason Greene
- Jerry Nolte, former state representative
- Ron Paul Shawd

==== Primary results ====
Republican primary results
| Party | Candidate | Votes | % |
|---|---|---|---|
| Republican | Jacob Turk | 24,814 | 58.9 |
| Republican | Jerry Nolte | 10,734 | 25.5 |
| Republican | Jason Greene | 5,067 | 12.0 |
| Republican | Ron Paul Shawd | 1,542 | 3.6 |
| Total votes | | 42,157 | 100.0 |

=== Libertarian primary ===
==== Candidates ====
===== Nominee =====
- Randall Langkraehr

==== Primary results ====
Libertarian primary results
| Party | Candidate | Votes | % |
|---|---|---|---|
| Libertarian | Randall Langkraehr | 335 | 100.0 |
| Total votes | | 335 | 100.0 |

=== General election ===
==== Predictions ====
| Source | Ranking | As of |
|---|---|---|
| The Cook Political Report | Safe D | November 5, 2012 |
| Rothenberg | Safe D | November 2, 2012 |
| Roll Call | Safe D | November 4, 2012 |
| Sabato's Crystal Ball | Safe D | November 5, 2012 |
| NY Times | Safe D | November 4, 2012 |
| RCP | Safe D | November 4, 2012 |
| The Hill | Safe D | November 4, 2012 |

==== Results ====
Missouri's 5th congressional district, 2012
| Party | Candidate | Votes | % |
|---|---|---|---|
| Democratic | Emanuel Cleaver (incumbent) | 200,290 | 60.5 |
| Republican | Jacob Turk | 122,149 | 36.9 |
| Libertarian | Randall Langkraehr | 8,497 | 2.6 |
| Independent | Andrew Feagle (write-in) | 6 | 0.0 |
| Total votes | | 330,942 | 100.0 |
| Democratic hold | | | |

== District 6 ==
2012 Missouri's 6th congressional district election
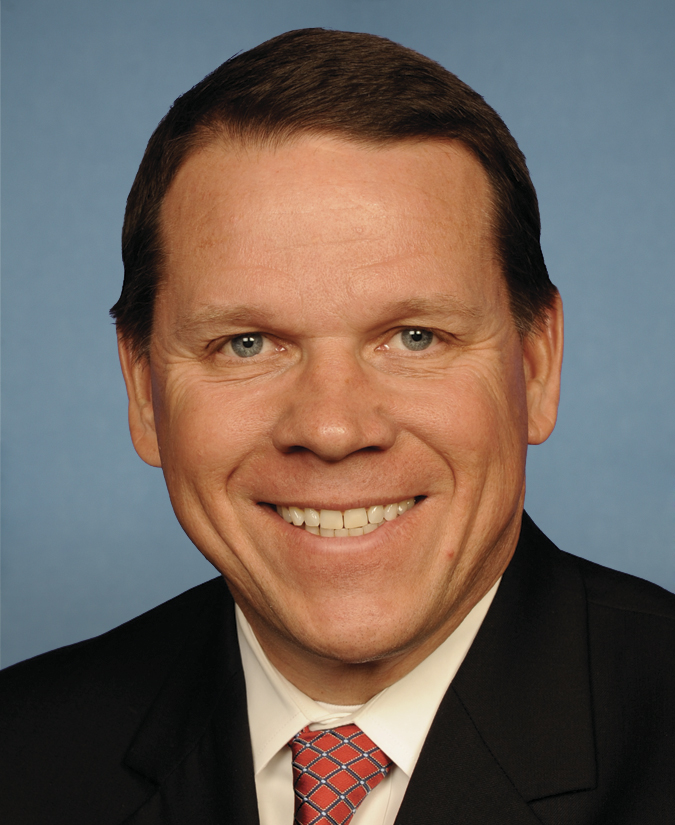

| Nominee | Sam Graves | Kyle Yarber |
| Party | Republican | Democratic |
| Popular vote | 216,906 | 108,503 |
| Percentage | 65.0% | 32.5% |
- Graves: 50–60% 60–70% 70–80% 80–90%
U.S. Representative before election
Sam Graves
Republican
Elected U.S. Representative
Sam Graves
Republican

Due to realignment following the 2010 U.S. census, the district spanned most of the northern portion of the state, from St. Joseph to Kirksville, and also included most of the state's portion of the Kansas City Metropolitan Area north of the Missouri River. Incumbent Sam Graves, who had represented the district since 2001, ran for reelection.

=== Republican primary ===
==== Candidates ====
===== Nominee =====
- Sam Graves, incumbent U.S. representative

===== Eliminated in primary =====
- Bob Gough, high school mathematics teacher
- Christopher Ryan

===== Withdrawn =====
- Jerry Nolte, former state representative

==== Primary results ====
Republican primary results
| Party | Candidate | Votes | % |
|---|---|---|---|
| Republican | Sam Graves (incumbent) | 59,388 | 80.3 |
| Republican | Christopher Ryan | 9,945 | 13.5 |
| Republican | Bob Gough | 4,598 | 6.2 |
| Total votes | | 73,931 | 100.0 |

=== Democratic primary ===
==== Candidates ====
===== Nominee =====
- Kyle Yarber, teacher

===== Eliminated in primary =====
- Ronald Harris, truck driver, Air Force veteran and candidate for the 5th district in 2000
- Bill Hedge, pastor of St. Francis Baptist Temple
- Ted Rights, physician

==== Primary results ====
Democratic primary results
| Party | Candidate | Votes | % |
|---|---|---|---|
| Democratic | Kyle Yarber | 10,242 | 32.5 |
| Democratic | Bill Hedge | 8,620 | 27.4 |
| Democratic | Ronald William Harris | 7,483 | 23.8 |
| Democratic | Ted Rights | 5,118 | 16.3 |
| Total votes | | 31,463 | 100.0 |

=== Libertarian primary ===
==== Candidates ====
===== Nominee =====
- Russ Lee Monchil, committeeman in Mirabile Township

==== Primary results ====
Libertarian primary results
| Party | Candidate | Votes | % |
|---|---|---|---|
| Libertarian | Russ Lee Monchil | 252 | 100.0 |
| Total votes | | 252 | 100.0 |

=== General election ===
==== Predictions ====
| Source | Ranking | As of |
|---|---|---|
| The Cook Political Report | Safe R | November 5, 2012 |
| Rothenberg | Safe R | November 2, 2012 |
| Roll Call | Safe R | November 4, 2012 |
| Sabato's Crystal Ball | Safe R | November 5, 2012 |
| NY Times | Safe R | November 4, 2012 |
| RCP | Safe R | November 4, 2012 |
| The Hill | Safe R | November 4, 2012 |

==== Results ====
Missouri's 6th congressional district, 2012
| Party | Candidate | Votes | % |
|---|---|---|---|
| Republican | Sam Graves (incumbent) | 216,906 | 65.0 |
| Democratic | Kyle Yarber | 108,503 | 32.5 |
| Libertarian | Russ Lee Monchil | 8,279 | 2.5 |
| Total votes | | 333,688 | 100.0 |
| Republican hold | | | |

== District 7 ==
2012 Missouri's 7th congressional district election
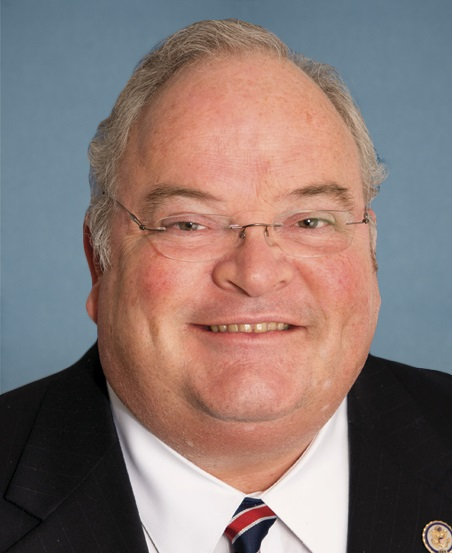

| Nominee | Billy Long | Jim Evans | Kevin Craig |
| Party | Republican | Democratic | Libertarian |
| Popular vote | 203,565 | 98,498 | 16,668 |
| Percentage | 63.9% | 30.9% | 5.2% |
- County results Long: 50–60% 60–70% 70–80%
U.S. Representative before election
Billy Long
Republican
Elected U.S. Representative
Billy Long
Republican

Incumbent Republican Billy Long, who had represented the district since 2011, ran for re-election.

=== Republican primary ===
==== Candidates ====
===== Nominee =====
- Billy Long, incumbent U.S. representative

===== Eliminated in primary =====
- Mike Moon, membership coordinator
- Tom Stilson, environmental geochemist

==== Primary results ====
Republican primary results
| Party | Candidate | Votes | % |
|---|---|---|---|
| Republican | Billy Long (incumbent) | 62,917 | 59.7 |
| Republican | Mike Moon | 22,860 | 21.7 |
| Republican | Tom Stilson | 19,666 | 18.6 |
| Total votes | | 105,443 | 100.0 |

=== Democratic primary ===
==== Candidates ====
===== Nominee =====
- Jim Evans, retired businessman, teacher, and U.S. Army veteran

==== Primary results ====
Democratic primary results
| Party | Candidate | Votes | % |
|---|---|---|---|
| Democratic | Jim Evans | 14,446 | 100.0 |
| Total votes | | 14,446 | 100.0 |

=== Libertarian primary ===
==== Candidates ====
===== Nominee =====
- Kevin Craig, editor of Vine & Fig Tree

==== Primary results ====
Libertarian primary results
| Party | Candidate | Votes | % |
|---|---|---|---|
| Libertarian | Kevin Craig | 303 | 100.0 |
| Total votes | | 303 | 100.0 |

=== General election ===
==== Predictions ====
| Source | Ranking | As of |
|---|---|---|
| The Cook Political Report | Safe R | November 5, 2012 |
| Rothenberg | Safe R | November 2, 2012 |
| Roll Call | Safe R | November 4, 2012 |
| Sabato's Crystal Ball | Safe R | November 5, 2012 |
| NY Times | Safe R | November 4, 2012 |
| RCP | Safe R | November 4, 2012 |
| The Hill | Safe R | November 4, 2012 |

==== Results ====
Missouri's 7th congressional district, 2012
| Party | Candidate | Votes | % |
|---|---|---|---|
| Republican | Billy Long (incumbent) | 203,565 | 63.9 |
| Democratic | Jim Evans | 98,498 | 30.9 |
| Libertarian | Kevin Craig | 16,668 | 5.2 |
| Independent | Kenneth Joe Brown (write-in) | 9 | 0.0 |
| Total votes | | 318,740 | 100.0 |
| Republican hold | | | |

== District 8 ==
2012 Missouri's 8th congressional district election
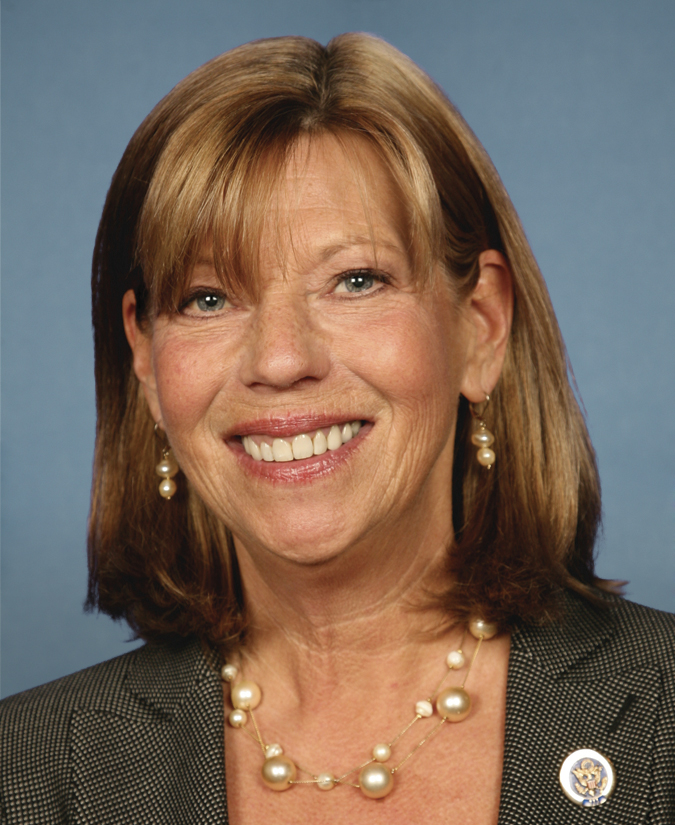

| Nominee | Jo Ann Emerson | Jack Rushin |
| Party | Republican | Democratic |
| Popular vote | 216,083 | 73,755 |
| Percentage | 71.9% | 24.6% |
- County results Emerson: 50–60% 60–70% 70–80% 80–90%
U.S. Representative before election
Jo Ann Emerson
Republican
Elected U.S. Representative
Jo Ann Emerson
Republican

Republican Jo Ann Emerson, who had represented Missouri's 8th congressional district since 1996, was challenged by Democratic nominee Jack Rushin and Libertarian nominee Rick Vandeven.

=== Republican primary ===
==== Candidates ====
===== Nominee =====
- Jo Ann Emerson, incumbent U.S. representative

===== Eliminated in primary =====
- Bob Parker, rancher and real estate agent

==== Primary results ====
Republican primary results
| Party | Candidate | Votes | % |
|---|---|---|---|
| Republican | Jo Ann Emerson (incumbent) | 61,975 | 67.1 |
| Republican | Bob Parker | 30,429 | 32.9 |
| Total votes | | 92,404 | 100.0 |

=== Democratic primary ===
==== Candidates ====
===== Nominee =====
- Jack Rushin, chiropractor

===== Withdrawn =====
- Todd Mahn, businessman

==== Primary results ====
Democratic primary results
| Party | Candidate | Votes | % |
|---|---|---|---|
| Democratic | Jack Rushin | 27,839 | 100.0 |
| Total votes | | 27,839 | 100.0 |

=== Libertarian primary ===
==== Candidates ====
===== Nominee =====
- Rick Vandeven

==== Primary results ====
Libertarian primary results
| Party | Candidate | Votes | % |
|---|---|---|---|
| Libertarian | Rick Vandeven | 164 | 100.0 |
| Total votes | | 164 | 100.0 |

=== General election ===
==== Endorsements ====
Jo Ann Emerson (R)

Organizations

- Maggie's List

==== Predictions ====
| Source | Ranking | As of |
|---|---|---|
| The Cook Political Report | Safe R | November 5, 2012 |
| Rothenberg | Safe R | November 2, 2012 |
| Roll Call | Safe R | November 4, 2012 |
| Sabato's Crystal Ball | Safe R | November 5, 2012 |
| NY Times | Safe R | November 4, 2012 |
| RCP | Safe R | November 4, 2012 |
| The Hill | Safe R | November 4, 2012 |

==== Results ====
Missouri's 8th congressional district, 2012
| Party | Candidate | Votes | % |
|---|---|---|---|
| Republican | Jo Ann Emerson (incumbent) | 216,083 | 71.9 |
| Democratic | Jack Rushin | 73,755 | 24.6 |
| Libertarian | Rob Vandeven | 10,553 | 3.5 |
| Total votes | | 300,391 | 100.0 |
| Republican hold | | | |

== See also ==
- 2013 Missouri's 8th congressional district special election
- 2012 United States Senate election in Missouri
- 2012 Missouri gubernatorial election
- 2012 Missouri lieutenant gubernatorial election
- 2012 Missouri Attorney General election
- 2012 Missouri State Treasurer election
- 2012 Missouri Secretary of State election
