= Electoral history of Jason Kander =

This is the electoral history of Jason Kander, the former Secretary of State of Missouri. He previously served as a member of the Missouri House of Representatives, and was a candidate for the United States Senate.

== Missouri House of Representatives elections ==
=== 2008 ===
Missouri House of Representatives Democratic primary election (44th district), 2008
Party	Candidate	Votes	%
Democratic	Jason Kander	3,277	68.4
Democratic	Amy Coffman	1,168	24.4
Democratic	Mary Cosgrove Spence	345	7.2

Missouri House of Representatives general election (44th district), 2008
Party	Candidate	Votes	%
Democratic	Jason Kander	16,082	100

=== 2010 ===
Missouri House of Representatives Democratic primary election (44th district), 2010
Party	Candidate	Votes	%
Democratic	Jason Kander (incumbent)	3,177	100

Missouri House of Representatives general election (44th district), 2010
Party	Candidate	Votes	%
Democratic	Jason Kander (incumbent)	8,922	69.6
Republican	Sarah B. Miller	3,892	30.4

== Secretary of State of Missouri elections, 2012 ==
Missouri Secretary of State Democratic primary election, 2012
Party	Candidate	Votes	%
Democratic	Jason Kander	247,630	86.9
Democratic	MD Rabbi Alam	37,390	13.1

Missouri Secretary of State general election, 2012
Party	Candidate	Votes	%
Democratic	Jason Kander	1,298,022	48.9
Republican	Shane Schoeller	1,258,937	47.4
Libertarian	Cisse W. Spragins	70,814	2.7
Constitution	Justin Harter	27,710	1.0

== United States Senate elections, 2016 ==
United States Senate Democratic primary election in Missouri, 2016
Party	Candidate	Votes	%
Democratic	Jason Kander	222,769	69.89
Democratic	Cori Bush	42,255	13.26
Democratic	Chief Wana Dubie	30,340	9.52
Democratic	Robert Mack	23,378	7.33

United States Senate general election in Missouri, 2016
Party	Candidate	Votes	%	±%
Republican	Roy Blunt (incumbent)	1,378,458	49.18%	−5.05%
Democratic	Jason Kander	1,300,200	46.39%	+5.76%
Libertarian	Jonathan Dine	67,738	2.42%	−0.60%
Green	Johnathan McFarland	30,743	1.10%	N/A
Constitution	Fred Ryman	25,407	0.91%	−1.22%
	Write-ins	95	0.03%	N/A
Plurality		78,258	2.79%	
Total votes		2,802,641	100.00%	
Republican hold				
