= 2012 Missouri lieutenant gubernatorial election =

- November 6, 2012
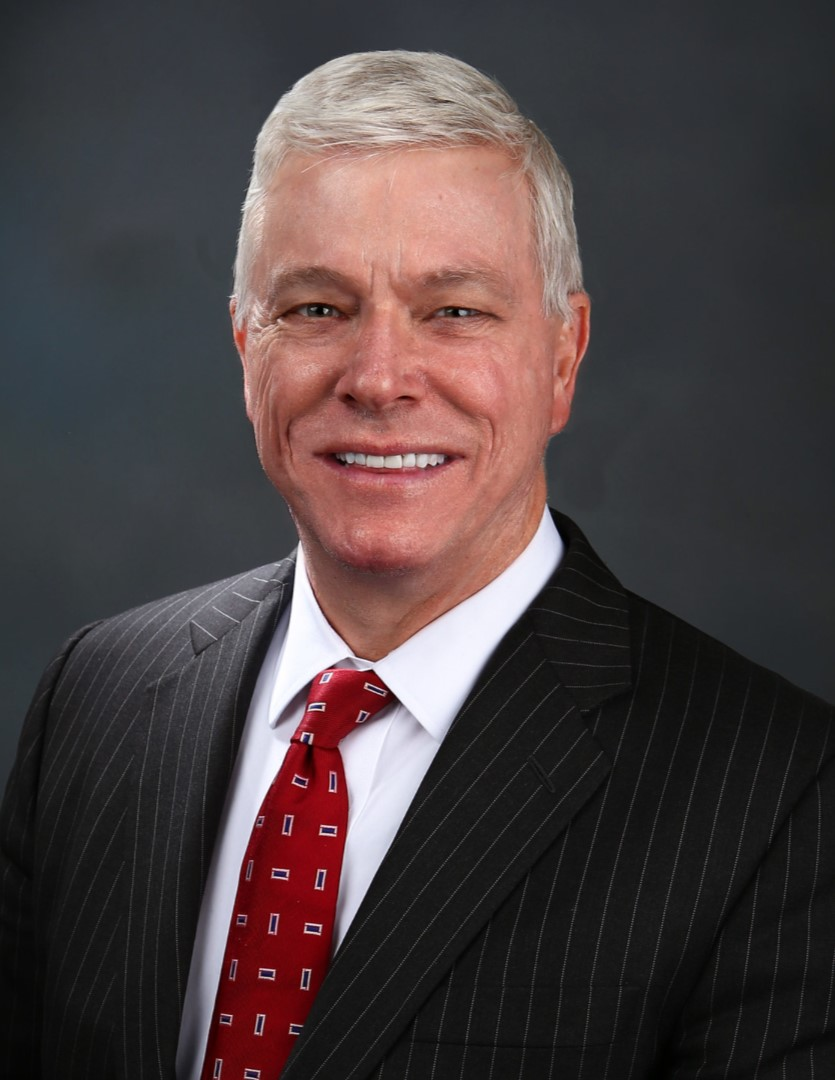

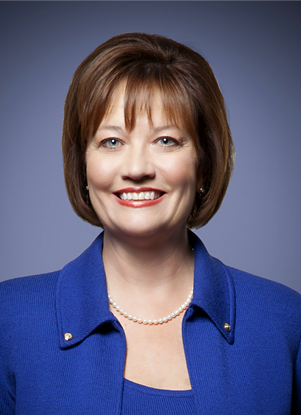
Nominee	Peter Kinder	Susan Montee
Party	Republican	Democratic
Popular vote	1,316,669	1,211,368
Percentage	49.4%	45.4%
- Kinder: 40–50% 50–60% 60–70% 70–80% Montee: 40–50% 50–60% 70–80%
Lieutenant Governor before election
Peter Kinder
Republican
Elected Lieutenant Governor
Peter Kinder
Republican

The 2012 Missouri lieutenant gubernatorial election was held on November 6, 2012. Incumbent Republican Peter Kinder faced Democratic nominee and former state auditor Susan Montee, Libertarian Matthew Copple, and the Constitution Party nominee, former state representative Cynthia Davis.

== Background ==
Incumbent lieutenant governor Peter Kinder won the 2008 Missouri lieutenant gubernatorial election with 49.9% of the vote against Democratic candidate Sam Page. Kinder had been considered the front-runner in the 2012 Republican Gubernatorial primary, but after various controversies emerged, he decided to run for re-election. His decision was also influenced by St. Louis businessman and multimillionaire Dave Spence unexpectedly declaring to run for governor and pledging to put much of his own money into the race.

=== Timeline ===
- March 27, 2012 – Filing deadline for Democrats, Republicans and Libertarians
- August 7, 2012 – Primary (gubernatorial and other statewide office) elections
- August 21, 2012 – Filing deadline for other third parties and Independents
- November 6, 2012 – General election

== Republican primary ==
=== Candidates ===
==== Declared ====
- Michael E. Carter, former municipal judge, corporate attorney and Democratic candidate for lieutenant governor in 2008
- Peter Kinder, incumbent lieutenant governor
- Charles W. Kullmann, retired college teacher
- Brad Lager, state senator

==== Declined ====
- Ed Martin, attorney
- Chris McKee, developer
- Luann Ridgeway, state senator
- Steven Tilley, speaker of the Missouri House of Representatives

=== Polling ===
Poll source	Date(s) administered	Sample size	Margin of error	Mike Carter	Peter Kinder	Charles Kullman	Brad Lager	Undecided
Public Policy Polling	August 4–5, 2012	590	± 4.0%	6%	42%	5%	30%	18%
Mason-Dixon	July 23–25, 2012	400	± 5.0%	6%	47%	1%	21%	25%

=== Results ===
Republican primary results
Party	Candidate	Votes	%
Republican	Peter Kinder (incumbent)	255,064	44.2
Republican	Brad Lager	239,735	41.5
Republican	Michael Carter	47,515	8.2
Republican	Charles Kullmann	34,940	6.1
Total votes		577,254	100.0

== Democratic primary ==
=== Candidates ===
==== Declared ====
- Judy Baker, former state representative and former regional director of the United States Department of Health and Human Services
- Sara Lampe, state representative
- Susan Montee, former State Auditor of Missouri and former chairwoman of the Missouri Democratic Party
- Becky Plattner, Missouri Conservation Commission chairwoman, former Presiding Commissioner of Saline County and candidate for lieutenant governor in 2008

==== Declined ====
- Mike Sanders, county executive of Jackson County
- Wes Shoemyer, former state senator

=== Polling ===
Poll source	Date(s) administered	Sample size	Margin of error	Judy Baker	Bill Haas	Susan Montee	Sarah Lampe	Becky Plattner	Undecided
Mason-Dixon	July 23–25, 2012	400	± 5.0%	5%	9%	28%	13%	4%	41%

=== Results ===
Democratic primary results
Party	Candidate	Votes	%
Democratic	Susan Montee	131,319	44.9
Democratic	Judy Baker	46,236	15.8
Democratic	Bill Haas	35,044	12.0
Democratic	Sarah Lampe	25,955	8.9
Democratic	Dennis Weisenburger	16,149	5.5
Democratic	Jackie Townes McGee	15,493	5.3
Democratic	Becky Lee Plattner	11,080	3.8
Democratic	Fred Kratky	10,976	3.8
Total votes		292,252	100.0

== Libertarian primary ==
=== Candidate ===
- Matthew Copple

=== Results ===
Libertarian primary results
Party	Candidate	Votes	%
Libertarian	Matthew Copple	2,432	100.0
Total votes		2,432	100.0

== Constitution primary ==
=== Candidate ===
- Cynthia Davis, former state representative

=== Results ===
Constitution primary results
Party	Candidate	Votes	%
Constitution	Cynthia Davis	760	100.0
Total votes		760	100.0

== General election ==
Kinder defeated all other candidates to become the first Missouri lieutenant governor to be elected to a third term since Frank Gaines Harris, who served from January 1933 to December 1944. Kinder received 49.4 percent of the vote, while Susan Montee received 45.4 percent. Libertarian Matthew Copple and Constitution Party candidate Cynthia L. Davis garnered 2.8 and 2.4 percent, respectively.

=== Polling ===
Poll source	Date(s) administered	Sample size	Margin of error	Peter Kinder (R)	Susan Montee (D)	Other	Undecided
Public Policy Polling	November 2–3, 2012	835	± 3.4%	44%	43%	—	13%
Mason-Dixon	October 23–25, 2012	625	± 4%	46%	41%	—	13%
Public Policy Polling	October 19–21, 2012	582	± 4.1%	43%	43%	—	13%
Public Policy Polling	August 20, 2012	500	± 4.4%	45%	38%	—	17%

=== Results ===
2012 Missouri lieutenant gubernatorial clection
Party	Candidate	Votes	%
Republican	Peter Kinder (incumbent)	1,316,653	49.4
Democratic	Susan Montee	1,211,353	45.4
Libertarian	Matthew Copple	75,169	2.8
Constitution	Cynthia Davis	63,594	2.3
Total votes		2,678,313	100.0
Republican hold			

==== By congressional district ====
Kinder won six of eight congressional districts.

District	Kinder	Montee	Representative
1st	19%	77%	Lacy Clay
2nd	54%	42%	Todd Akin (112th Congress)
2nd	54%	42%	Ann Wagner (113th Congress)
3rd	56%	37%	Russ Carnahan (112th Congress)
3rd	56%	37%	Blaine Luetkemeyer (113th Congress)
4th	55%	39%	Vicky Hartzler
5th	36%	59%	Emanuel Cleaver
6th	54%	41%	Sam Graves
7th	62%	33%	Billy Long
8th	61%	35%	Jo Ann Emerson

== See also ==
- 2012 United States gubernatorial elections
- 2012 United States Senate election in Missouri
- 2012 United States House of Representatives elections in Missouri
- 2012 Missouri gubernatorial election
- 2012 Missouri Attorney General election
- 2012 Missouri State Treasurer election
- 2012 Missouri Secretary of State election
