= 2012 Missouri Attorney General election =

- November 6, 2012
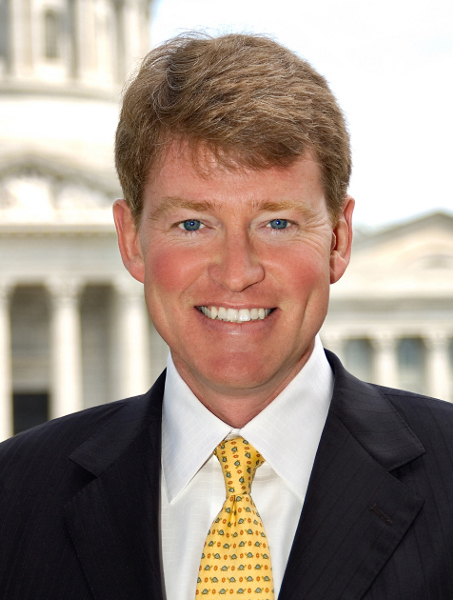

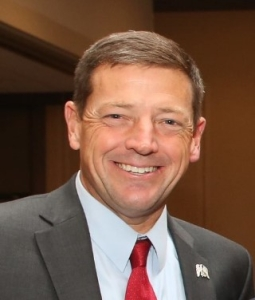
Nominee	Chris Koster	Ed Martin
Party	Democratic	Republican
Popular vote	1,491,139	1,084,106
Percentage	55.9%	40.6%
- Koster: 40–50% 50–60% 60–70% 80–90% Martin: 40–50% 50–60% 60–70%
Attorney General before election
Chris Koster
Democratic
Elected Attorney General
Chris Koster
Democratic

The 2012 Missouri Attorney General election was held on November 6, 2012, alongside the presidential and gubernatorial elections. The incumbent Missouri Attorney General Chris Koster, a Democrat, won re-election for a second full term against Republican attorney Ed Martin. As of 2026, this is the last time a Democrat was elected Attorney General of Missouri.

== Background ==
Koster was originally elected as attorney general in 2008 as a Democrat after switching from the Republican Party. Koster won despite accusations that his campaign violated state law in raising money from multiple committees. He also survived the disclosure that he played a supporting role in a plagiarism episode that damaged Attorney General William L. Webster’s campaign for governor in 1992. Fresh out of law school, Koster worked for Webster, a Republican, as an assistant state attorney general.

He defeated State Representative Margaret Donnelly in the Democratic primary for the nomination for Missouri Attorney General and won against Republican state senator Michael R. Gibbons in the general election, 53%-47%. He was sworn in as attorney general on January 12, 2009, succeeding Jay Nixon, who had served since 1993.

== Timeline ==
- March 27, 2012 - Filing deadline for Democrats, Republicans and Libertarians
- August 7, 2012 - Primary (gubernatorial and other statewide office) elections
- August 21, 2012 - Filing deadline for other third parties and Independents
- November 6, 2012 - General election

== Republican primary ==
=== Candidates ===
==== Declared ====
- Ed Martin, attorney
- Adam Lee Warren, prosecuting attorney of Livingston County

==== Declined ====
- Cole McNary, state representative

=== Polling ===
Poll source	Date(s) administered	Sample size	Margin of error	Ed Martin	Adam Warren	Undecided
Public Policy Polling	August 4–5, 2012	590	± 4.0%	46%	17%	37%

=== Results ===
100% reporting (3,420 of 3,420 precincts)

Republican primary results
Party	Candidate	Votes	%
Republican	Ed Martin	373,434	71.6
Republican	Adam Lee Warren	148,432	28.4
Total votes		521,866	100.0

Martin, who served as chief of staff for Governor Matt Blunt from 2006 until November 2007, won the Republican primary in a landslide, 72%-28% and became the party's nominee.

== Democratic primary ==
=== Candidates ===
==== Declared ====
- Chris Koster, incumbent attorney general since 2008

Koster was unopposed for the Democratic nomination.

== General election ==
=== Polling ===
Poll source	Date(s) administered	Sample size	Margin of error	Chris Koster (D)	Ed Martin (R)	Other	Undecided
Mason-Dixon	October 23–25, 2012	625	± 4%	51%	37%	—	12%
Public Policy Polling	October 19–21, 2012	582	± 4.1%	48%	38%	—	13%
Public Policy Polling	August 20, 2012	500	± 4.4%	41%	39%	—	20%

=== Results ===
2012 Missouri Attorney General election
Party	Candidate	Votes	%	±%
Democratic	Chris Koster (incumbent)	1,482,381	55.81%	+2.98
Republican	Ed Martin	1,081,510	40.71%	−6.46
Libertarian	Dave Browning	92,465	3.48%	N/A
Total votes		2,668,064	100.00%	N/A
Democratic hold				

On election day, Koster defeated Martin by a wide margin of over 14 percentage points, an increase from his 5% margin of victory in 2008. This was despite Republican Mitt Romney defeating Democratic President Barack Obama in the concurrent presidential election in Missouri, although other incumbent state Democratic officials were re-elected as well. Governor Jay Nixon won re-election by more than 12 percentage points, Senator Claire McCaskill won re-election by over 15 percentage points, and Clint Zweifel won by 5 percentage points. Jason Kander was also elected Secretary of State by just over one percentage point.

==== By congressional district ====
Koster won six of eight congressional districts, including four that elected Republicans.

District	Koster	Martin	Representative
1st	83%	15%	Lacy Clay
2nd	51%	46%	Todd Akin (112th Congress)
2nd	51%	46%	Ann Wagner (113th Congress)
3rd	50%	46%	Russ Carnahan (112th Congress)
3rd	50%	46%	Blaine Luetkemeyer (113th Congress)
4th	52%	44%	Vicky Hartzler
5th	67%	29%	Emanuel Cleaver
6th	51%	45%	Sam Graves
7th	44%	52%	Billy Long
8th	48.0%	48.3%	Jo Ann Emerson

== See also ==
- 2012 United States presidential election in Missouri
- 2012 United States Senate election in Missouri
- 2012 United States House of Representatives elections in Missouri
- 2012 Missouri gubernatorial election
- 2012 Missouri lieutenant gubernatorial election
- 2012 Missouri State Treasurer election
- 2012 Missouri Secretary of State election
