= 2012 Missouri Secretary of State election =

- November 6, 2012
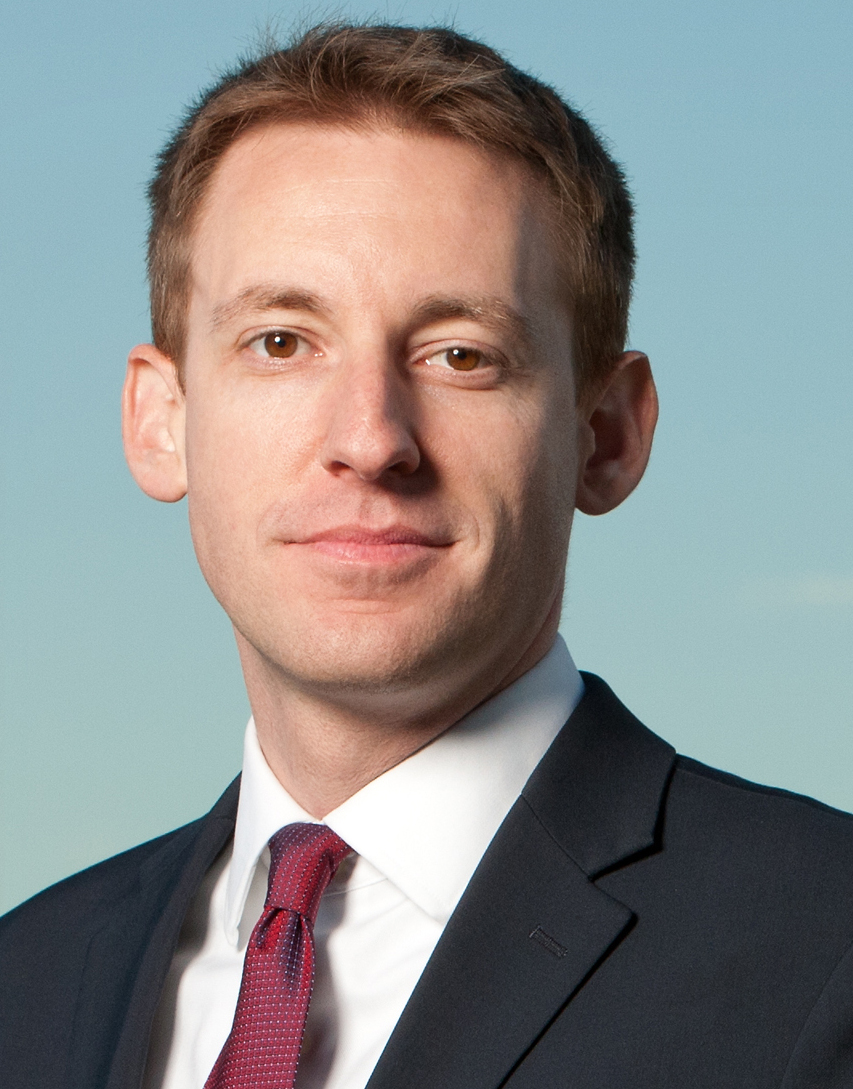

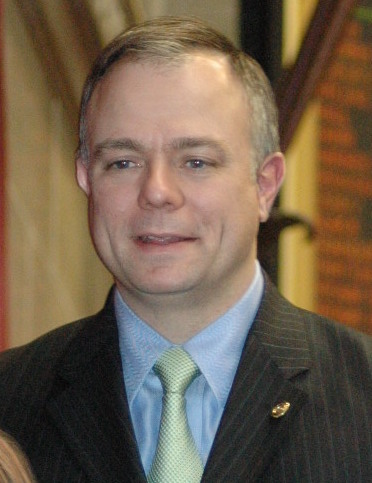
Nominee	Jason Kander	Shane Schoeller
Party	Democratic	Republican
Popular vote	1,298,022	1,258,937
Percentage	48.9%	47.4%
- Kander: 40–50% 50–60% 60–70% 80–90% Schoeller: 40–50% 50–60% 60–70% 70–80%
Secretary of State before election
Robin Carnahan
Democratic
Elected Secretary of State
Jason Kander
Democratic

The 2012 Missouri Secretary of State election was held on November 6, 2012, alongside the presidential and gubernatorial elections. Democratic State Representative Jason Kander defeated Republican Speaker Pro Tem Shane Schoeller by 39,085 votes.

== Background ==
Incumbent Missouri Secretary of State Robin Carnahan won the 2008 Missouri secretary of state election with 61.8% of the vote against Republican candidate Mitchell Hubbard. She announced on September 30, 2011 that she would not run for reelection, creating an open seat in 2012.

== Timeline ==
- March 27, 2012 - Filing deadline for Democrats, Republicans and Libertarians
- August 7, 2012 - Primary (gubernatorial and other statewide office) elections
- August 21, 2012 - Filing deadline for other third parties and Independents
- November 6, 2012 - General election

== Republican primary ==
=== Candidates ===
- Scott Rupp, state senator
- Shane Schoeller, speaker pro tem of the Missouri House of Representatives
- Bill Stouffer, state senator

=== Potential ===
- Jason Crowell, state senator
- John Diehl, state representative
- Mike Kehoe, state senator
- Ron Richard, state senator and former Speaker of the Missouri House of Representatives

=== Declined ===
- Brad Lager, state senator
- Ed Martin, attorney

=== Results ===
Republican primary results
Party	Candidate	Votes	%
Republican	Shane Schoeller	193,207	35.3
Republican	Scott Rupp	188,701	34.5
Republican	Bill Stouffer	165,588	30.2
Total votes		547,496	100.0

== Democratic primary ==
=== Candidates ===
- MD Rabbi Alam
- Jason Kander, state representative

=== Potential ===
- Stacey Newman, state representative

=== Declined ===
- Robin Carnahan, incumbent Secretary of State
- Russ Carnahan, U.S. representative
- Ryan Dillon, former aide to former U.S. Rep. Ike Skelton
- Mike Sanders, county executive of Jackson County

=== Results ===
Democratic primary results
Party	Candidate	Votes	%
Democratic	Jason Kander	247,630	86.9
Democratic	MD Rabbi Alam	37,390	13.1
Total votes		285,020	100.0

== General election results ==
2012 Missouri Secretary of State election
Party	Candidate	Votes	%
Democratic	Jason Kander	1,298,022	48.9%
Republican	Shane Schoeller	1,258,937	47.4%
Libertarian	Cisse W. Spragins	70,814	2.7%
Constitution	Justin Harter	27,710	1.0%
Total votes		2,655,483	100.0%
Democratic hold			

=== By congressional district ===
Despite losing the state, Schoeller won six of eight congressional districts.

District	Kander	Schoeller	Representative
1st	81%	16%	Lacy Clay
2nd	46%	51%	Todd Akin (112th Congress)
2nd	46%	51%	Ann Wagner (113th Congress)
3rd	42%	54%	Russ Carnahan (112th Congress)
3rd	42%	54%	Blaine Luetkemeyer (113th Congress)
4th	42%	54%	Vicky Hartzler
5th	63%	33%	Emanuel Cleaver
6th	45%	51%	Sam Graves
7th	32%	64%	Billy Long
8th	39%	57%	Jo Ann Emerson

== See also ==
- 2012 United States presidential election in Missouri
- 2012 United States Senate election in Missouri
- 2012 United States House of Representatives elections in Missouri
- 2012 Missouri gubernatorial election
- 2012 Missouri lieutenant gubernatorial election
- 2012 Missouri Attorney General election
- 2012 Missouri State Treasurer election

== Official campaign websites ==
- Jason Kander for Secretary of State
- Rabbi Alam for Secretary of State
- MD Rabbi Alam for Secretary of State
- Scott Rupp for Secretary of State
- Shane Schoeller for Secretary of State
- Bill Stouffer for Secretary of State
