= 2008 Missouri gubernatorial election =

- November 4, 2008
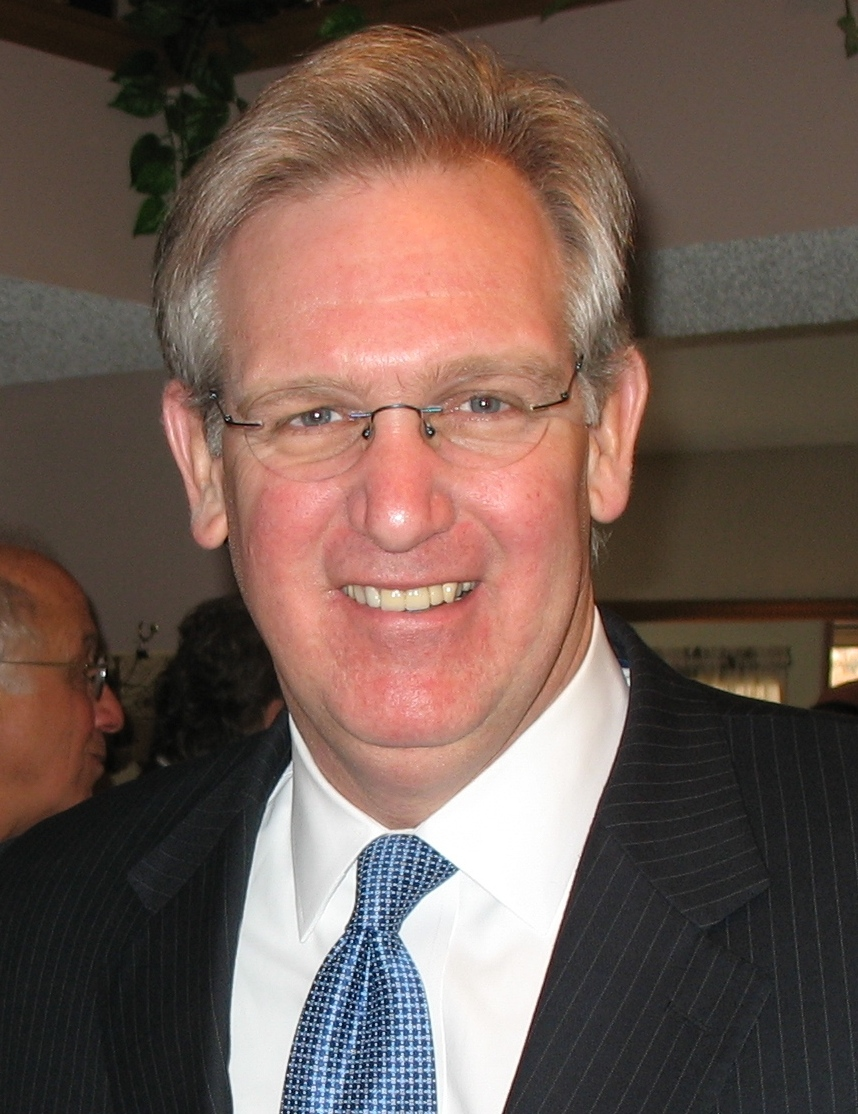

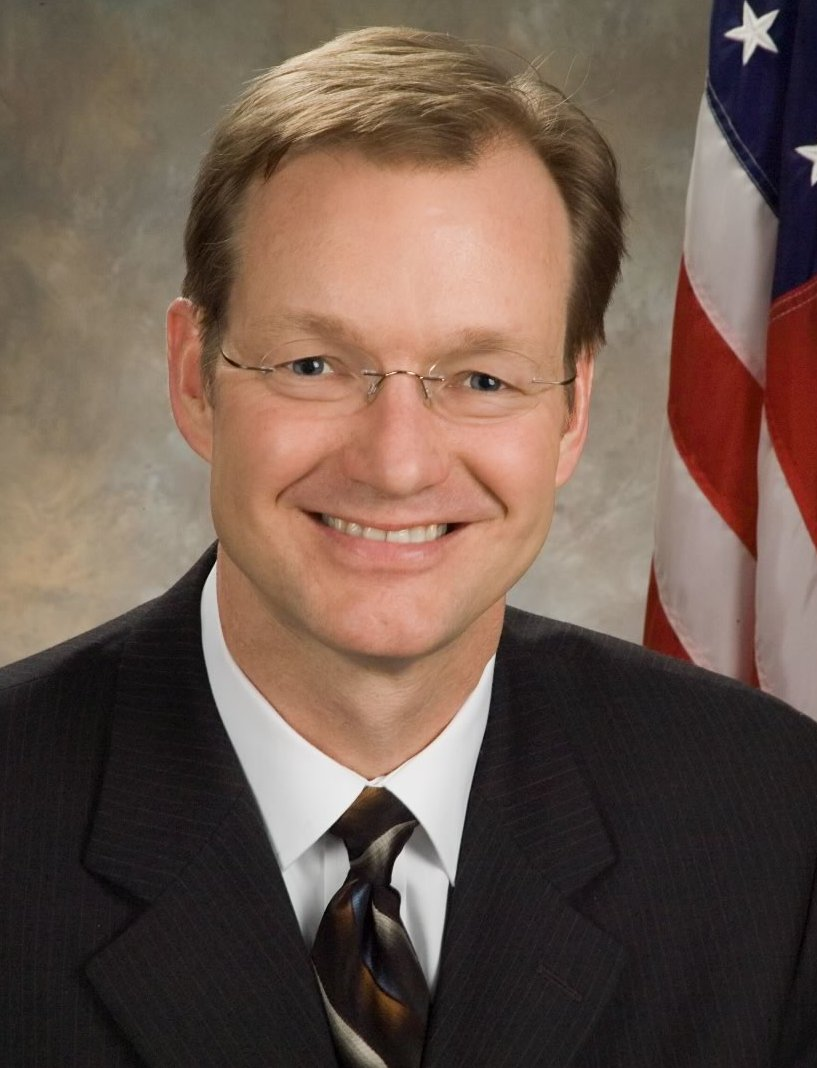
Nominee	Jay Nixon	Kenny Hulshof
Party	Democratic	Republican
Popular vote	1,680,661	1,136,364
Percentage	58.40%	39.49%
- Nixon: 40–50% 50–60% 60–70% 80–90% Hulshof: 40–50% 50–60% 60–70%
Governor before election
Matt Blunt
Republican
Elected Governor
Jay Nixon
Democratic

The 2008 Missouri gubernatorial election was held on November 4, 2008. Incumbent Republican Governor Matt Blunt decided to retire instead of seeking reelection to a second term in office. Despite John McCain narrowly carrying the state in the concurrent presidential election, Democratic nominee Jay Nixon won the open seat, defeating Republican nominee Kenny Hulshof in a landslide.

As of 2024, this remains the last gubernatorial election in which the Democratic Party improved upon its performance from the previous election

== Background ==
On January 22, 2008, Governor Blunt unexpectedly announced that he would not seek re-election because he had already "achieved virtually everything I set out to accomplish, and more ... Because I feel we have changed what I wanted to change in the first term, there is not the same sense of mission for a second."

A November 2007 poll conducted by SurveyUSA showed Blunt with a 44% approval rating. His approval among Republicans polled was 68%, and his rating among Democrats was 23%. On November 10, 2007, Democrat Jay Nixon filed the necessary paperwork with the Missouri Ethics Commission to launch a 2008 campaign for governor.

The gubernatorial and other statewide office primaries were held August 5, 2008. CQ Politics rated the race as "Leans Democratic".

=== Timeline ===
- March 25, 2008 – Filing deadline for Democrats, Republicans and Libertarians
- August 5, 2008 – Primary (gubernatorial and other statewide office) elections
- August 19, 2008 – Filing deadline for other third parties and Independents
- November 4, 2008 – General election.

== Primaries ==
=== Republican primary ===
Republican primary results
Party	Candidate	Votes	%
Republican	Kenny Hulshof	194,556	49.2
Republican	Sarah Steelman	176,750	44.7
Republican	Scott Long	18,745	4.7
Republican	Jen Sievers	5,664	1.4
Total votes		395,715	100.0

=== Democratic primary ===
Democratic primary results
Party	Candidate	Votes	%
Democratic	Jay Nixon	303,796	85.0
Democratic	Daniel Carroll	53,768	15.0
Total votes		357,564	100.0

== General election ==
=== Predictions ===
Source	Ranking	As of
The Cook Political Report	Lean D (flip)	October 16, 2008
Rothenberg Political Report	Likely D (flip)	November 2, 2008
Sabato's Crystal Ball	Lean D (flip)	November 3, 2008
Real Clear Politics	Likely D (flip)	November 4, 2008

=== Polling ===
Source	Date	Kenny Hulshof (R)	Jay Nixon (D)
Public Policy Polling	November 2, 2008	38%	58%
Survey USA	November 2, 2008	39%	54%
Survey USA	October 26, 2008	38%	55%
Rasmussen Reports	October 14, 2008	38%	57%
Survey USA	September 24, 2008	37%	54%
Rasmussen Reports	September 11, 2008	39%	54%
Public Policy Polling	August 17, 2008	42%	48%
Survey USA	July 31, 2008	42%	48%
Rasmussen Reports	July 7, 2008	38%	49%
Rasmussen	June 9, 2008	34%	54%
Survey USA	May 20, 2008	33%	57%
Rasmussen	May 8, 2008	35%	51%
Rasmussen	March 24, 2008	37%	48%
Rasmussen	February 13, 2008	30%	48%

Hypothetical polling

With Steelman

Source	Date	Sarah Steelman (R)	Jay Nixon (D)
Survey USA	July 31, 2008	41%	50%
Rasmussen Reports	July 7, 2008	37%	46%
Rasmussen	June 9, 2008	34%	56%
Survey USA	May 20, 2008	33%	58%
Rasmussen	May 8, 2008	35%	51%
Rasmussen	March 24, 2008	39%	46%
Rasmussen	February 13, 2008	35%	46%

With Blunt

Source	Date	Matt Blunt (R)	Jay Nixon (D)
Rasmussen Reports	December 12, 2007	42%	47%
Research2000	November 24, 2007	42%	51%
Rasmussen	October 10, 2007	44%	43%
Rasmussen	August 23, 2007	43%	46%
SurveyUSA	July 25–27, 2007	38%	57%

=== Results ===
On election night, Nixon won easily, even though fellow Democrat Barack Obama lost in Missouri in the concurrent presidential election (albeit by only 4,000 votes). Nixon performed well in rural parts of the state. When combined with heavily populated, strong Democratic areas like St. Louis and Kansas City, Hulshof did not have a chance to come back. Nixon was declared the winner right when the polls closed in Missouri. Hulshof conceded defeat at 9:02 P.M. Central Time.

2008 Missouri gubernatorial election
Party	Candidate	Votes	%	±%
Democratic	Jay Nixon	1,680,611	58.40%	+10.55%
Republican	Kenny Hulshof	1,136,364	39.49%	−11.34%
Libertarian	Andrew Finkenstadt	31,850	1.11%	+0.21%
Constitution	Gregory Thompson	28,941	1.01%	+0.59%
Write-in		12	0.00%	—
Majority		544,247	18.91%	+15.93%
Turnout		2,877,778		
Democratic gain from Republican				

==== Counties that flipped from Republican to Democratic ====
- Caldwell (largest city: Hamilton)
- Daviess (largest city: Gallatin)
- Gentry (largest city: Albany)
- Crawford (largest city: Cuba)
- Oregon (largest city: Thayer)
- Vernon (largest city: Nevada)
- Lincoln (largest city: Troy)
- St. Clair (largest city: Appleton City)
- Livingston (largest city: Chillicothe)
- Andrew (largest city: Savannah)
- Atchison (largest city: Tarkio)
- Benton (largest city: Warsaw)
- Camden (largest city: Osage Beach)
- Carter (largest city: Van Buren)
- Cass (largest city: Harrisonville)
- Dallas (largest city: Buffalo)
- Dent (largest city: Salem)
- Douglas (largest city: Ava)
- Howell (largest city: West Plains)
- Laclede (largest city: Lebanon)
- Maries (largest city: Belle)
- Morgan (largest city: Versailles)
- Ozark (largest city: Gainesville)
- Pulaski (largest city: Fort Leonard Wood)
- Polk (largest city: Bolivar)
- Phelps (largest city: Rolla)
- Ripley (largest city: Doniphan)
- Texas (largest city: Licking)
- Wright (largest city: Mountain Grove)
- Webster (largest city: Marshfield)
- Audrain (largest city: Mexico)
- Bates (largest city: Butler)
- Chariton (largest city: Salisbury)
- Clark (largest city: Kahoka)
- Dunklin (largest city: Kennett)
- Franklin (largest city: Washington)
- Henry (largest city: Clinton)
- Hickory (largest city: Hermitage)
- Howard (largest city: Fayette)
- Iron (largest city: Ironton)
- Knox (largest city: Edina)
- Lafayette (largest city: Odessa)
- Lewis (largest city: Canton)
- Linn (largest city: Brookfield)
- Madison (largest city: Fredericktown)
- Nodaway (largest city: Maryville)
- Pike (largest city: Bowling Green)
- Reynolds (largest city: Ellington)
- Scott (largest city: Sikeston)
- Shannon (largest city: Winona)
- St. Francois (largest city: Farmington)
- Wayne (largest city: Piedmont)
- Buchanan (largest city: St. Joseph)
- Washington (largest city: Potosi)
- Iron (largest city: Ironton)
- St. Charles (largest city: O'Fallon)
- Pettis (largest city: Sedalia)
- Adair (largest city: Kirksville)
- Greene (largest city: Springfield)
- Johnson (largest city: Warrensburg)
- Monroe (largest city: Monroe City)

== See also ==
- 2008 United States gubernatorial elections
- 2004 Missouri gubernatorial election
- 2008 Missouri lieutenant gubernatorial election
- 2008 United States presidential election in Missouri
