= 2008 Missouri lieutenant gubernatorial election =

2008 Missouri Lieutenant gubernatorial election
- November 4, 2008
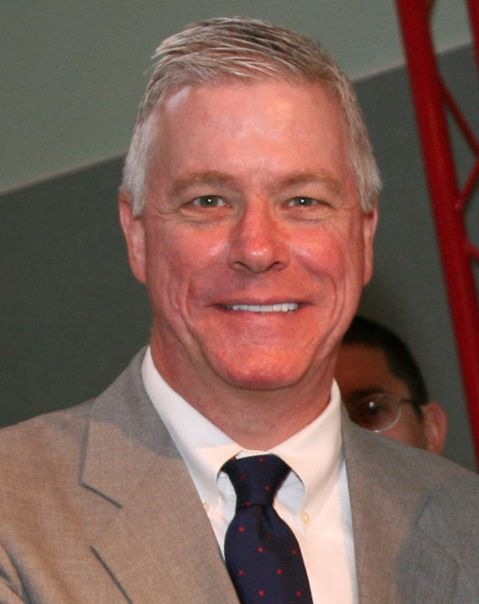

Nominee	Peter Kinder	Sam Page
Party	Republican	Democratic
Popular vote	1,403,706	1,331,177
Percentage	49.9%	47.3%
- Kinder: 40–50% 50–60% 60–70% 70–80% 80–90% >90% Page: 40–50% 50–60% 60–70% 70–80% 80–90% >90% Tie: 40–50% 50% No votes
Lieutenant Governor before election
Peter Kinder
Republican
Elected Lieutenant Governor
Peter Kinder
Republican

The 2008 Missouri lieutenant gubernatorial election was held on November 4, 2008, to elect the Lieutenant Governor of Missouri. Republican incumbent Peter Kinder won the election narrowly, despite the fact that Democratic Attorney General Jay Nixon won the 2008 Missouri gubernatorial election by nearly 20 points.

== Background ==
On January 22, 2008, Governor Blunt unexpectedly announced that he would not seek re-election because he had already "achieved virtually everything I set out to accomplish, and more ... Because I feel we have changed what I wanted to change in the first term, there is not the same sense of mission for a second."

A November 2007 poll conducted by SurveyUSA showed Blunt with a 44% approval rating. His approval among Republicans polled was 68%, but his rating among Democrats was only 23%.

On November 10, 2005, Democrat Jay Nixon filed the necessary paperwork with the Missouri Ethics Commission to launch a 2008 campaign for governor.

The gubernatorial and other statewide office primaries were held August 5, 2008. CQ Politics rated the race as 'Leans Democratic'.

== Timeline ==
- March 25, 2008 - Filing deadline for Democrats, Republicans and Libertarians
- August 5, 2008 - Primary (gubernatorial and other statewide office) elections
- August 19, 2008 - Filing deadline for other third parties and Independents
- November 4, 2008 - General election.

== Republican primary ==
Republican primary results
Party	Candidate	Votes	%
Republican	Peter Kinder (incumbent)	283,955	78.3
Republican	Paul Douglas Sims	50,833	14.0
Republican	Arthur Hodge Sr.	27,982	7.7
Turnout		362,770	100

== Democratic primary ==
Democratic primary results
Party	Candidate	Votes	%
Democratic	Sam Page	129,423	40.2
Democratic	Michael E. Carter	52,574	16.3
Democratic	Mary Williams	43,930	13.7
Democratic	Becky L. Plattner	41,141	12.8
Democratic	Richard Charles Tolbert	33,589	10.4
Democratic	C. Lillian Metzger	20,964	6.5
Turnout		321,621	100

== General election ==
=== Polling ===
Source	Date	Peter Kinder (R)	Sam Page (D)
Public Policy Polling	November 2, 2008	50%	41%
Global Strategies Group	September 22, 2008	37%	38%
Public Policy Polling	August 17, 2008	48%	37%

=== Results ===
2008 Missouri lieutenant gubernatorial election
Party	Candidate	Votes	%	±%
Republican	Peter Kinder (incumbent)	1,403,706	49.9	+1.0
Democratic	Sam Page	1,331,177	47.3	−1.1
Libertarian	Teddy Fleck	49,862	1.8	−0.2
Constitution	James Rensing	29,153	1.0	+0.4
Majority		72,529		
Turnout		2,813,898		
Republican hold		Swing		

== See also ==
- 2008 United States gubernatorial elections
- 2008 Missouri gubernatorial election
