= Peter Kinder =

American lawyer and politician (born 1954)

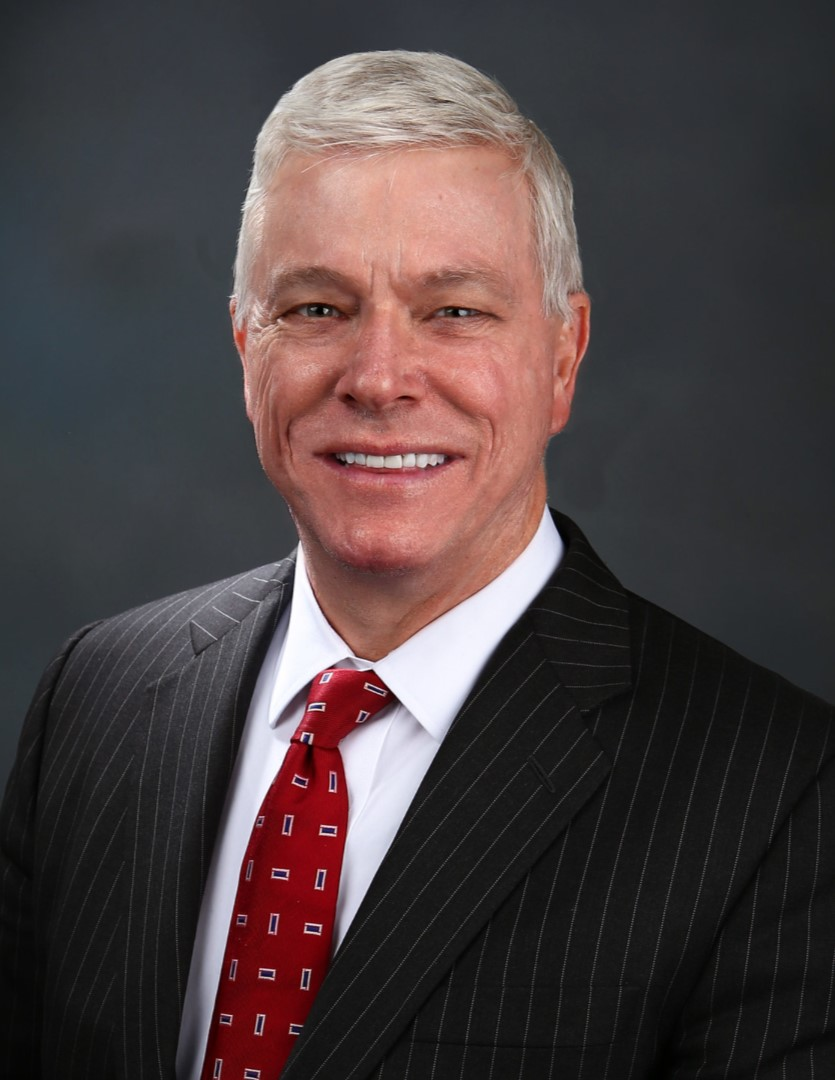

Chair of the Missouri Republican Party
- Incumbent
- Assumed office February 1, 2025
- Preceded by: Nick Myers

46th Lieutenant Governor of Missouri
- In office January 10, 2005 – January 9, 2017
- Governor: Matt Blunt; Jay Nixon
- Preceded by: Joe Maxwell
- Succeeded by: Mike Parson

President pro tempore of the Missouri Senate
- In office February 5, 2001 – January 5, 2005
- Preceded by: Edward Quick
- Succeeded by: Michael R. Gibbons

Member of the Missouri Senate from the 27th district
- In office January 6, 1993 – January 5, 2005
- Preceded by: John Dennis
- Succeeded by: Jason Crowell

Personal details
- Born: May 12, 1954 (age 72) Cape Girardeau, Missouri, U.S.
- Party: Republican
- Education: Southeast Missouri State University (attended); University of Missouri, Columbia (BA); St. Mary's University, Texas (JD)

Peter Dickson Kinder (born May 12, 1954) is an American lawyer and politician who served as the 46th Lieutenant Governor of Missouri from 2005 to 2017. He was appointed as a co-chairman of the Delta Regional Authority in August 2017, serving in that post until he resigned in June 2018.

Kinder was first elected lieutenant governor in 2004, succeeding Joe Maxwell, and was re-elected in 2008 at the same time Democrat Jay Nixon was elected governor. Kinder was the only Republican in Missouri to win statewide office in 2008, as all other Republicans running for each of the other statewide offices suffered defeat. Despite the generally poor election year for Republicans, Kinder carried 109 of Missouri's 114 counties.

Considered the front-runner in the 2012 Republican gubernatorial primary, Kinder instead ran for re-election in 2012 and was again the only Republican to win statewide and became the first lieutenant governor to be elected to a third term in Missouri since 1940. In July 2015, Kinder announced his entry into the 2016 gubernatorial election; he was later defeated in the Republican primary by Eric Greitens.

== Education and early career ==
Kinder was born and raised in Cape Girardeau, the son of pediatrician James A. Kinder Jr. and Mary Frances Hunter Kinder. He attended Cape Girardeau Public Schools and then attended Southeast Missouri State University and the University of Missouri in Columbia. He received his J.D. degree from St. Mary's University School of Law in San Antonio, Texas in 1979 and was admitted to the Missouri Bar in 1980.

In 1972, fresh out of high school, Kinder worked for former U.S. Sen. Jack Danforth's re-election bid for Missouri attorney general. After graduating from law school at St. Mary's University in San Antonio, Texas, Kinder managed Bill Emerson's successful 1980 campaign for U.S. Congress. It was the first time a Republican won in southeast Missouri for U.S. Congress since 1928.

After law school Kinder served as a member of the late U.S. Representative Bill Emerson's staff in Washington, D.C. from 1980 to 1983. He returned to Missouri and worked as an attorney and real estate specialist for hotel developer Charles Drury of Drury Industries. In 1987 Kinder became associate publisher of the Southeast Missourian newspaper, where he wrote weekly columns and editorials.

Southeast Missouri Hospital in Cape Girardeau dedicated its Department of Pediatrics to his father two months before he died in an automobile accident on July 1, 2000. His mother, who died on January 4, 2008, sang duets with the mother of Rush Limbaugh for 50 years; Rush Limbaugh attended the funeral.

== Political career ==
In 1992, Kinder made his first bid for public office, winning election to a seat in the Missouri State Senate representing Cape Girardeau and surrounding counties by defeating former Missouri First Lady and gubernatorial candidate Betty C. Hearnes (D). Kinder was reelected to the State Senate in 1996 and 2000. When the Republicans gained a majority in the Missouri Senate for the first time in over 50 years, following a round of special elections in February 2001, Kinder was voted president pro tempore, the top official in the Missouri Senate. Kinder was the first Republican president pro tempore in the Missouri Senate in 53 years. In 2004 he sought and won election as lieutenant governor, narrowly defeating Bekki Cook (D-Cape Girardeau).

=== Tour of Missouri ===
As a member of the Missouri Tourism Commission, Kinder helped establish the Tour of Missouri, an international professional bicycle race, and served as its chairman. The week-long (6 days in 2007), 600+ mile event first took place in 2007, with Kinder as its chairman. The race was extended to seven days for 2008 and 2009. The race ran annually from 2007 to 2009 and was the third highest profile domestic race in the United States. The Tour of Missouri was one of the top stage races outside of Europe and brought in athletes from over 20 countries. During its three-year run, the race attracted an estimated 1.2 million spectators and created a direct economic impact of $80 million. The Tour of Missouri was cancelled from 2010 by the Missouri Tourism Commission. Funding for the tour was described as a power struggle between Kinder and Governor Nixon.

=== Healthcare policy ===
Kinder was reelected in November 2008. He led a lawsuit by Missouri citizens against the federal healthcare law. Kinder's lawsuit sought to have the individual mandate declared unconstitutional. On August 4, 2010, Missouri voters passed Proposition C, rejecting the federal law's mandate to purchase health insurance, by 71%.

=== Alleged relationship with exotic dancer ===
In August 2011, The Riverfront Times published an article where Tammy Chapman, a former exotic dancer, and 1992 Penthouse Pet, claimed she met Kinder at a political event at a gentleman's club around 1994. The two did not speak again until a chance encounter 18 years later during the summer of 2011. Chapman approached Kinder and asked to take a photo with him. The photo was then published when The Riverfront Times ran Chapman's speculative story where Chapman claimed Kinder visited her club in the early to mid 90s when he was a state senator.

Kinder responded and said he had visited the club around 1994 and met Chapman, and that he had not seen her again until the chance encounter in 2011. Chapman confirmed that the two had not spoken since the mid 90s until she saw him in 2011 and approached him to take a picture. Kinder said that, sometime around 1994, after going to the club he decided not to go back because it was inconsistent with how he had been raised. Kinder stated that Chapman's story was part of a "partisan smear" to derail his campaign for governor. Kinder further said that Democrats tried to use similar tactics against him in his 2008 campaign for lieutenant governor.

=== Hotel expenses and repayment ===
In April 2011, the St. Louis Post-Dispatch published a story stating that Kinder (who has a home in Cape Girardeau and an office in Jefferson City) charged the taxpayers over $35,000 for at least 329 nights at hotels in St. Louis and St. Louis County since 2006. Kinder responded that he had been audited twice, both times by Democratic state auditors, and no concerns were raised about any of the hotel stays. Kinder stated that he always paid the government rate, typically $105/night, during his stays at the Chase Park Plaza, the Four Seasons, the Ritz-Carlton and elsewhere. He further stated, "There were many times I'd attempt to stay at other [lesser known] hotels, The Sheraton, The Westin, The Renaissance Grand, some Hampton Inns and they would have a rate higher than the $105 that I was staying with." Kinder defended the stays as fulfillment of official government duties as Lt Governor; meetings, events, and state business that he routinely scheduled during his weekly drive home to Cape Girardeau from Jefferson City. Kinder maintained that all of the overnight stays were proper, and tied to official events. He acknowledged that on occasion he attended campaign or personal events the same days he was in the area as a practice of good financial stewardship. Kinder announced that he would repay the state $35,050 for hotel costs incurred while traveling in the St. Louis area, to avoid "the slightest taint or suspicion" associated with his name or public service. Due to concerns over campaign finance laws, Kinder ultimately chose not to use campaign funds and instead repaid the money personally. Kinder elected to repay $52,320, the entire amount that he had been reimbursed by the state for in-state travel since 2005.

=== Shooting of Michael Brown ===
In reference to the period after the shooting of Michael Brown by police in August 2014, Kinder said in March 2015 that President Barack Obama and Attorney General Eric Holder had engaged in "incitement of the mob" and "encouraging disorder in Ferguson." Kinder also repeatedly accused Missouri Governor Jay Nixon of reckless disregard and lack of leadership during the Ferguson riots.

=== 2016 campaign ===
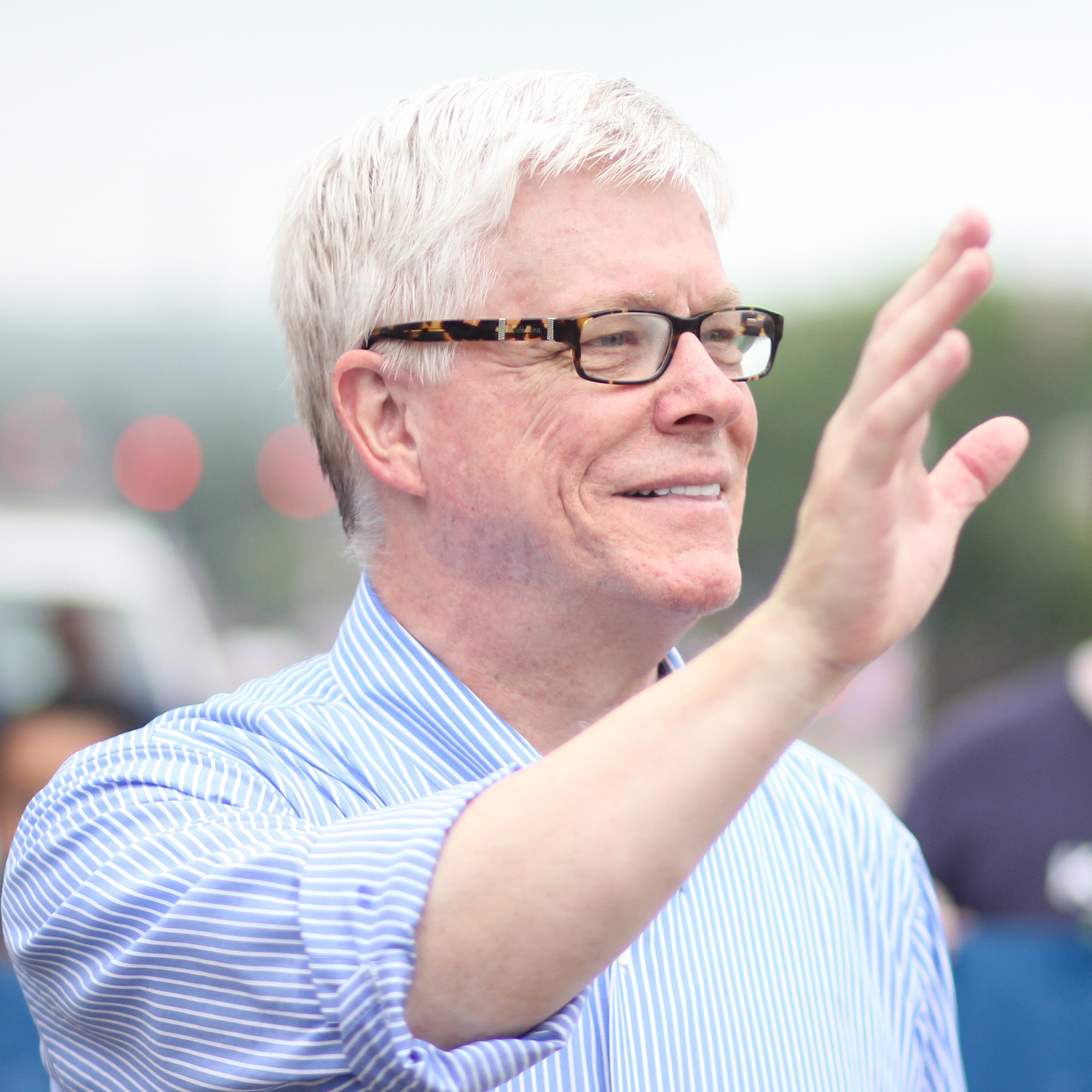
Kinder at a 2016 Independence Day parade

Kinder announced in the Ferguson/Dellwood area in July 2015 that he would seek election to the Missouri governor's office in 2016. Following his announcement, an August 2015 Public Policy Polling poll showed that Peter Kinder led Democratic candidate Chris Koster 40% to 37%. Results of a transportation union funded poll from April 2016 showed Kinder as the only Republican candidate close to Koster, yet trailing; its margin of error at 3.8% with 95% confidence. In late June 2016, Kinder was trailing the three other Republican primary candidates in fundraising, having raised $1.5 million. The other Republican candidates, Greitens, Brunner, and Hanaway, had collected $6.2, $5.7, and $3.4 million, respectively.

A negative attack ad campaign by LG PAC during summer 2016 implied that it supported Kinder despite Kinder's pledge to campaign cleanly. The PAC was secretly associated with Greitens. Kinder later called it the dirtiest political trick he'd witnessed in his career.

Kinder lost the Missouri Republican primary on August 2, 2016. He finished third with 20.7% of the popular vote, losing to Eric Greitens. Kinder carried six counties in Southeast Missouri, including Bollinger, Cape Girardeau, Mississippi, Perry, Scott, and Stoddard, with businessman John Brunner winning eleven counties mostly in Southwest Missouri and Navy SEAL Eric Greitens winning the rest of the state. When his term as lieutenant governor expired in January 2017, Kinder went out of public office for the first time since his election to the state Senate in 1992.

=== Later service ===
In a February 2017 interview with Cape Girardeau's KFVS-TV, Kinder said he was "considering a couple private sector opportunities" in Missouri, had been offered a consulting position, and had discussed a few potential positions to help the Trump administration.

In August 2017, President Trump appointed Kinder as a co-chairman of the Delta Regional Authority, a federal economic development board serving over 250 counties and parishes in eight states near the Mississippi River. By October 2017, Kinder had directed more than $500,000 in cuts to DRA administrative expenses, which had previously taken 8.6 percent of the agency's $30 million budget. Kinder acted as head of the DRA until Chris Caldwell of Arkansas was confirmed and sworn in to its higher co-chairman role in January 2018. Kinder resigned from the DRA on June 1, 2018, saying he plans to work in the private sector and remain in Cape Girardeau. He was succeeded by Leslie Durham.

== Electoral history ==
=== For Governor ===
2016 Republican Primary Election for Governor of Missouri
| Party | Candidate | Votes | % |
|---|---|---|---|
| Republican | Eric Greitens | 236,481 | 34.56% |
| Republican | John Brunner | 169,620 | 24.79% |
| Republican | Peter Kinder | 141,629 | 20.70% |
| Republican | Catherine Hanaway | 136,521 | 19.95% |
| Total votes | | 684,251 | 100.00% |

=== As Lt. Governor ===
2012 Election for Lieutenant Governor of Missouri
| Party | Candidate | Votes | % | ±% |
|---|---|---|---|---|
| Republican | Peter Kinder (incumbent) | 1,319,747 | 49.28 | −0.60 |
| Democratic | Susan Montee | 1,219,457 | 45.53 | −1.78 |
| Libertarian | Matthew Copple | 75,169 | 2.81 | +1.04 |
| Constitution | Cynthia L. Davis | 63,594 | 2.37 | +1.33 |
| Write-In | Charles Jackson | 346 | 0.01 | |

2012 Republican Primary Election for Lieutenant Governor of Missouri
| Party | Candidate | Votes | % | ± |
|---|---|---|---|---|
| Republican | Peter Kinder (incumbent) | 255,064 | 44.19 | |
| Republican | Brad Lager | 239,735 | 41.53 | |
| Republican | Mike Carter | 47,515 | 8.23 | |
| Republican | Charles Kullmann | 34,940 | 6.05 | |

2008 Election for Lieutenant Governor of Missouri
| Party | Candidate | Votes | % | ±% |
|---|---|---|---|---|
| Republican | Peter Kinder (incumbent) | 1,403,706 | 49.88 | +0.93 |
| Democratic | Sam Page | 1,331,177 | 47.31 | −1.12 |
| Libertarian | Teddy Fleck | 49,862 | 1.77 | −0.25 |
| Constitution | James C. Rensing | 29,153 | 1.04 | +0.44 |

2008 Republican Primary Election for Lieutenant Governor of Missouri
| Party | Candidate | Votes | % | ± |
|---|---|---|---|---|
| Republican | Peter Kinder (incumbent) | 284,064 | 78.3 | |
| Republican | Paul Douglas Sims | 50,870 | 14.0 | |
| Republican | Arthur Hodge, Sr. | 27,994 | 7.7 | |

2004 Election for Lieutenant Governor of Missouri
| Party | Candidate | Votes | % | ±% |
|---|---|---|---|---|
| Republican | Peter Kinder | 1,300,109 | 48.95 | |
| Democratic | Bekki Cook | 1,286,295 | 48.43 | |
| Libertarian | Mike Ferguson | 53,770 | 2.02 | |
| Constitution | Bruce Hillis | 15,935 | 0.60 | |

2004 Republican Primary Election for Lieutenant Governor of Missouri
| Party | Candidate | Votes | % | ± |
|---|---|---|---|---|
| Republican | Peter Kinder | 313,528 | 56.2 | |
| Republican | Patricia "Pat" Secrest | 244,699 | 43.8 | |

=== As Missouri State Senator ===
2000 Election for Missouri's 27th Senatorial District Seat
| Party | Candidate | Votes | % | ±% |
|---|---|---|---|---|
| Republican | Peter Kinder (incumbent) | 49,442 | 100.00 | +36.27 |

1996 Election for Missouri's 27th Senatorial District Seat
| Party | Candidate | Votes | % | ±% |
|---|---|---|---|---|
| Republican | Peter Kinder (incumbent) | 40,412 | 63.73 | |
| Democratic | Rick Althaus | 22,999 | 36.27 | |

1992 Election for Missouri's 27th Senatorial District Seat
| Party | Candidate | Votes | % | ±% |
|---|---|---|---|---|
| Republican | Peter Kinder | 37,047 | 55.41 | |
| Democratic | Betty Hearnes | 29,817 | 44.59 | |

Missouri Senate
| Preceded by Edward Quick | President pro tempore of the Missouri Senate; 2001–2005 | Succeeded by Michael R. Gibbons |
Party political offices
| Preceded by Wendell Bailey | Republican nominee for Lieutenant Governor of Missouri; 2004, 2008, 2012 | Succeeded by Mike Parson |
| Preceded by Nick Myers | Chair of the Missouri Republican Party; 2025–present | Incumbent |
Political offices
| Preceded by Joe Maxwell | Lieutenant Governor of Missouri; 2005–2017 | Succeeded by Mike Parson |
