= Jerry Nolte =

American politician

Jerry Nolte (born October 4, 1955) formerly served as a Republican member of the Missouri House of Representatives. He is a former teacher. He resides in Gladstone, Missouri.

He has been an advertising artist working out of his own studio since 1978. He has also been an art teacher at Oakhill Day School. He attends St. Charles Catholic Church in Gladstone, and is an officer of the Knights of Columbus.

He was first elected to the Missouri House of Representatives in 2004, and served on the following committees:

- Appropriations - Public Safety and Corrections,
- Local Government, and
- Tourism.

On 28 February 2008, Nolte introduced House Bill No. 1463 providing "that aliens unlawfully present in the United States shall not be eligible for enrollment in the university or college."

== Electoral history ==
=== State Representative ===
Missouri State Representative General Election, District 33, November 2, 2004
Party	Candidate	Votes	%	±%
Republican	Jerry Nolte	9,024	51.52	
Democratic	Pam Payne	8,491	48.48	
Total votes		17,515	100.00	

Missouri State Representative General Election, District 33, November 7, 2006
Party	Candidate	Votes	%	±%
Republican	Jerry Nolte	6,980	50.53	−0.99
Democratic	Terry Stone	6,833	49.47	+0.99
Total votes		13,813	100.00	

Missouri State Representative General Election, District 33, November 4, 2008
Party	Candidate	Votes	%	±%
Republican	Jerry Nolte	9,442	53.15	+2.62
Democratic	Terry Stone	8,323	46.85	−2.62
Total votes		17,765	100.00	

Missouri State Representative General Election, District 33, November 2,2010
Party	Candidate	Votes	%	±%
Republican	Jerry Nolte	7,853	65.13	+11.98
Democratic	Jim Stoufer	4,204	34.87	−11.98
Total votes		12,057	100.00	

=== Clay County Presiding Commissioner ===
Clay County Presiding Commissioner Republican Primary, August 5, 2014
Party	Candidate	Votes	%	±%
Republican	Jerry Nolte	8,299	51.63	
Republican	Pam Mason	7,775	48.37	
Total votes		16,074	100.00	

Clay County Presiding Commissioner General Election, November 4, 2014
Party	Candidate	Votes	%	±%
Republican	Jerry Nolte	28,752	56.70	
Democratic	Jay P. Swearingen	21,884	43.16	
Write-in		72	0.14	
Total votes		50,708	100.00	

Clay County Presiding Commissioner Republican Primary, August 7, 2018
Party	Candidate	Votes	%	±%
Republican	Jerry Nolte	10,877	50.49	−1.14
Republican	Pam Mason	7,403	34.37	−14.00
Republican	Beth Keller	1,756	8.15	n/a
Republican	Dan Troutz	1,505	5.99	n/a
Total votes		21,541	100.00	

Clay County Presiding Commissioner General Election November 6, 2018
Party	Candidate	Votes	%	±%
Republican	Jerry Nolte	51,448	54.21	−2.49
Democratic	Wendi Bridges	43,329	45.65	+2.49
Write-in		129	0.14	0.00
Total votes		94,906	100.00	

Clay County Presiding Commissioner General Election, November 8, 2022
Party	Candidate	Votes	%	±%
Nonpartisan	Jerry Nolte	54,097	70.81	
Nonpartisan	Dan Troutz	21,393	28.00	
Write-in		911	1.19	
Total votes		76,401	100.00	
