= Cynthia Davis =

American politician

Cynthia L. Davis

Member of the Missouri House of Representatives from the 19th district
- In office 2003–2011
- Preceded by: Charles F. Nordwald
- Succeeded by: Kurt Bahr

Personal details
- Born: November 23, 1959 Chicago, Illinois, U.S.
- Party: Republican (before 2011, 2016–present)
- Other political affiliations: Constitution (2011-2016)
- Spouse: Bernie Davis
- Children: John, Benjamin, Cathryn, Matthew, Amanda, Susanna, and Philip
- Education: Nyack College
- Profession: Politician

Cynthia L. Davis (born November 23, 1959) is an American politician, who served as a member of the Missouri House of Representatives from 2003 to 2011. A member of the Republican Party while in office, Davis was the Constitution Party nominee for Missouri Lieutenant Governor in the 2012 election.

== Personal life ==
Davis was born in Chicago, Illinois, but moved to the Massachusetts area as a teenager. Following graduation from Needham School in Needham, Massachusetts she attended Nyack College, a private, evangelical college in Nyack, New York, majoring in music. Davis and husband Bernie moved to Missouri in 1984, opening a Christian bookstore in O'Fallon, Missouri in 1989. They are the parents of seven children.

== Political career ==
Davis was appointed to chair the legislative committee for the O'Fallon Business Association in 1992. She was elected to the O'Fallon Board of Aldermen in 1994, serving as its president in 1995 and was thereafter elected to five consecutive terms. Davis was elected to the 19th district seat in the Missouri House of Representatives in 2002. After defeating fellow Republicans Marilyn Field and Mark Haynes in the August primary, she ran unopposed in the November general election. Davis was reelected in 2004, 2006, and 2008.

While a member of the House Davis served on the following committees: Chairman of the Children and Families Committee, Chairman of the Interim Committee on Poverty, Member of Healthcare Policy Committee, State Parks and Waterways Committee, Vice-chair of the Healthcare, Policy Committee, Elections Committee. Additionally, she served as the Missouri House majority whip.

Among the bills filed by Davis one called for a state ban on elective abortions. She said the bill would "protect public safety, health and welfare". Representative Davis, along with fellow representative Tim Jones were among a number of politicians to support a "Birther" lawsuit by attorney/dentist Orly Taitz against President Barack Obama and various members of his administration. The lawsuit was dismissed by Federal judge David Carter.

In 2004 Davis used campaign funds to pay the property taxes on a home in Jefferson City, Missouri. She paid a $1,000 fine to settle a finding by the state Ethics Commission that violated campaign finance laws.

Due to Missouri's term limit rules, Davis was ineligible to run for the House seat again in 2010. She lost a Republican primary race for state senator in 2010, receiving 12,494 votes, or 45.4%. Davis left the Republican party in July 2011, joining the Constitution Party. In a letter to the Republican Central Committee she cited among her reasons for making the switch were pandering over principles, government of the highest bidders, and blocking fair party nominations. Further, she claimed that both the Republican and Democratic parties had "become destructive to our rights and freedoms". Speaking on her party switch, according to Davis, Democrats and Republicans have locked into a vicious cycle of abuse and "..both have treated us with what is known as the battered wife syndrome, when people get beaten up and before the court date they kiss and make up and everybody is happy again. Then they get to court and police officers have documentation that they saw the broken window and the body go through the window, they have pictures of the black eye and the fat lip and the broken arm, but by the time the court date comes, like my grandmother would say, 'tweren't nothing'".

Davis also lost a subsequent election for the St. Charles County Ambulance Board. After her final House term expired in January 2011 Davis took a position as executive director with the Center for Marriage Policy as well as serving on the executive board for Pure Hope, a group formerly known as the National Coalition for the protection of Children and Families.

On October 2, 2011, she announced her run for Lieutenant Governor as a Constitution Party candidate. She received 63,390 votes, or 2.37%.

On March 29, 2016, she filed as a Republican to run for the U.S. House of Representatives in Missouri's 3rd Congressional District, the only person challenging incumbent Blaine Luetkemeyer in the Republican primary. She lost the primary with 26.54% of the votes.

== Lunch controversy ==
In June 2009, remarks made by Davis in her constituent newsletter received local and national criticism. Davis attacked programs providing subsidized meals for school-age children from lower-income families during the summer months, claiming that such programs "could break apart more families" and asserting that "Hunger can be a positive motivator."

The Daily Star-Journal said that Davis "seems to have missed a lesson in humanity," concluding that "Schools provide real parents a real place where their real children can get a real meal, which is a lot more filling than empty advice from politicians." St. Louis Today characterized Davis as "oblivious," declaring that "When you chair a state special committee on children and families, you probably ought to learn something about the needs of children and families." Springfields New-Leader columnist Roger Ray called Davis "clueless" and noted reports that Davis had been seen "stealing food at state dinners to take home to her children.". Missouri House Minority Floor Leader Paul LeVota requested Davis be removed as chairwoman of the Children and Families Committee. And Missouri's junior U.S. Senator Claire McCaskill responded that "Fagin agreed that hunger was a motivator for children. I don't."

Davis was named the daily "worst person in the world" more than once on Countdown with Keith Olbermann for her comments. Stephen Colbert mocked Davis's comments about the motivational effect of hunger, telling Missourians "If you see Representative Davis at a restaurant or a hot dog stand or even through the window of her own dining room, do the right thing and take her food away." Los Angeles Times columnist Patt Morrison concluded that "Questioning the need for school meals doesn't prove that there is no need for them – only that someone's not paying attention, or chooses not to.".

Davis has responded by stating her comments were taken out of context, saying "We all agree on the importance of feeding children, but we differ on who should do this." However, in an April 2012 interview with The Kirksville Daily Express newspaper she was quoted "people pushing the left-wing ideology will use children as human shields to protect more government spending. But, I'm a big champion of the family, and I believe children are best served when they have their mom and dad feed them meals, not when they're institutionalized." Explaining her use of the term institutionalized, Davis said the lunch programs weakened families by pulling children away from the home and was "treating them like a herd of cattle". She further went on in the interview to say "If government needs to feed children then why don't we build barracks and provide them with beds at night? If the parents aren't going to feed them, maybe they don't get their own bed, either. Where does it end?".
