= 2010 United States House of Representatives elections in Missouri =

- November 2, 2010

All 9 Missouri seats to the United States House of Representatives
	Majority party	Minority party
Party	Republican	Democratic
Last election	5	4
Seats won	6	3
Seat change	▲1	▼1
Popular vote	1,103,290	708,064
Percentage	57.44%	36.87%
Swing	▲10.90%	▼13.21%

Republican
40–50%
50–60%
60–70%
70–80%
80–90%
Democratic
40–50%
50–60%
60–70%
70–80%

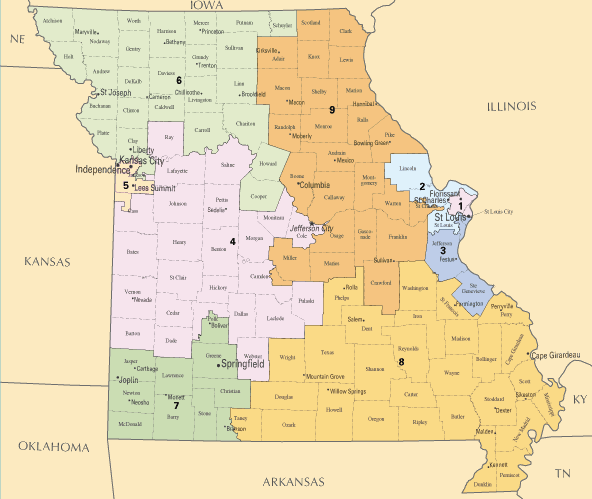
Missouri's congressional districts in 2010

Elections were held on November 2, 2010, to determine Missouri's nine members of the United States House of Representatives. Representatives were elected for two-year terms to serve in the 112th Congress from January 3, 2011, until January 3, 2013. Primary elections were held on August 3, 2010.

Of the nine elections, the races in the 3rd and 4th districts were rated as competitive by The Cook Political Report, CQ Politics, The Rothenberg Political Report and Sabato's Crystal Ball. Seven of Missouri's nine incumbents were re-elected, while one (Ike Skelton of the 4th district) unsuccessfully sought re-election and one (Roy Blunt of the 7th district) did not seek re-election.

In total, six Republicans and three Democrats were elected. A total of 1,920,675 votes were cast, of which 1,103,290 (57.44 percent) were for Republican candidates, 708,064 (36.87 percent) were for Democratic candidates, 92,485 (4.81 percent) were for Libertarian Party candidates, 8,759 (0.46 percent) were for Constitution Party candidates, 7,193 (0.37 percent) were for an independent candidate and 884 (0.05 percent) were for write-in candidates.

== Overview ==
Results of the 2010 United States House of Representatives elections in Missouri by district:

District	Republican		Democratic		Others		Total		Result
District	Votes	%	Votes	%	Votes	%	Votes	%	Result
District 1	43,649	23.62%	135,907	73.55%	5,223	2.83%	184,779	100.0%	Democratic hold
District 2	180,481	67.94%	77,467	29.16%	7,684	2.89%	265,632	100.0%	Republican hold
District 3	94,757	46.66%	99,398	48.94%	8,930	4.40%	203,085	100.0%	Democratic hold
District 4	113,489	50.43%	101,532	45.11%	10,035	4.46%	225,056	100.0%	Republican gain
District 5	84,578	44.18%	102,076	53.33%	4,769	2.49%	191,423	100.0%	Democratic hold
District 6	154,103	69.44%	67,762	30.54%	47	0.02%	221,912	100.0%	Republican hold
District 7	141,010	63.39%	67,545	30.37%	13,876	6.24%	222,431	100.0%	Republican hold
District 8	128,499	65.56%	56,377	28.76%	11,123	5.68%	195,999	100.0%	Republican hold
District 9	162,724	77.36%	0	0.00%	47,634	22.64%	210,358	100.0%	Republican hold
Total	1,103,290	57.44%	708,064	36.87%	109,321	5.69%	1,920,675	100.0%	

== District 1 ==
2010 Missouri's 1st congressional district election
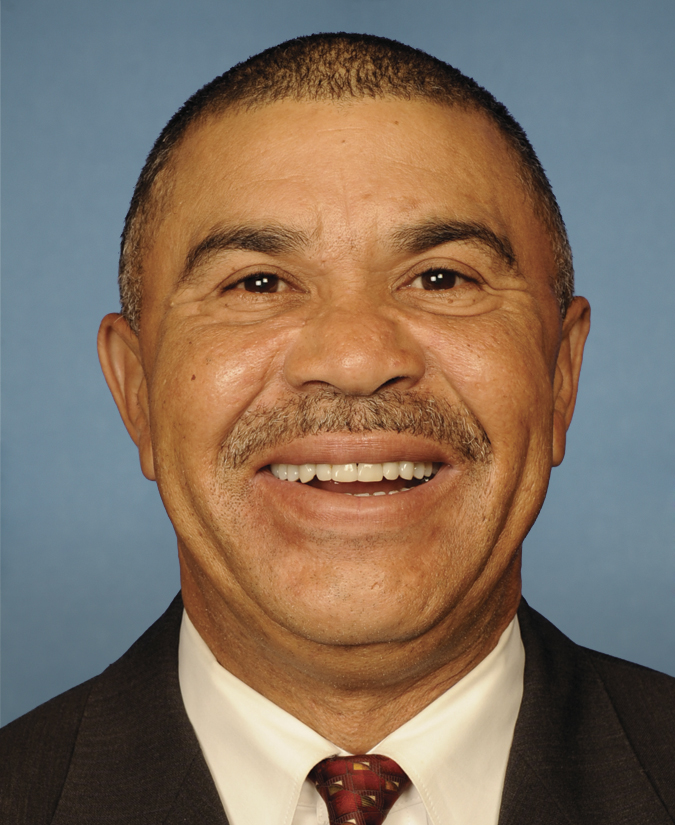

Nominee	Lacy Clay	Robyn Hamlin
Party	Democratic	Republican
Popular vote	135,907	43,649
Percentage	73.6%	23.6%
- County results Clay: 60–70% 90–100%
U.S. Representative before election
Lacy Clay
Democratic
Elected U.S. Representative
Lacy Clay
Democratic

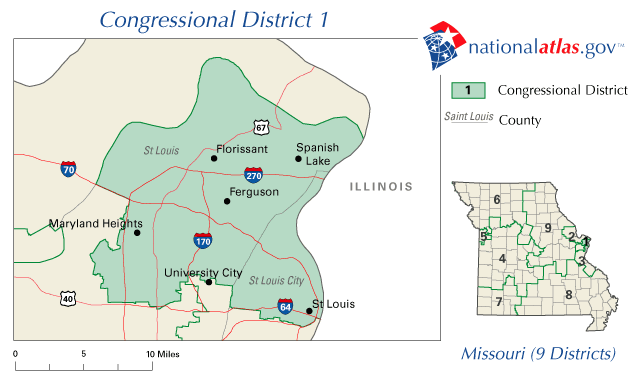
Missouri's 1st congressional district in 2010

The 1st district included Ferguson, Florissant, Hazelwood, Spanish Lake, and parts of St. Louis and University City. The district's population was 54 percent black and 40 percent white (see Race and ethnicity in the United States census); 83 percent were high school graduates and 24 percent had received a bachelor's degree or higher. Its median income was $41,404. In the 2008 presidential election the district gave 80 percent of its vote to Democratic nominee Barack Obama and 19 percent to Republican nominee John McCain.

Democrat William Lacy Clay, Jr., who took office in 2001, was the incumbent. Clay was re-elected in 2008 with 87 percent of the vote. In 2010 Clay's opponent in the general election was Republican nominee Robyn Hamlin, an insurance agent. Libertarian Party nominee Julie Stone also ran. Candice Britton also sought the Democratic nomination. Martin Baker and Marshall Works also sought the Republican nomination. Robb Cunningham also sought the Libertarian nomination.

Clay raised $693,370 and spent $635,944. Hamlin raised $23,930 and spent $24,012. Britton raised $1,813 and spent $2,026.

Prior to the election FiveThirtyEight's forecast gave Clay a 100 percent chance of winning and projected that he would receive 74 percent of the vote to Hamlin's 23 percent. On election day Clay was re-elected with 74 percent of the vote to Hamlin's 24 percent. Clay was re-elected in 2012, again over Hamlin, and in 2014.

=== Democratic primary results ===
Democratic primary results
Party	Candidate	Votes	%
Democratic	William Lacy Clay, Jr. (incumbent)	37,041	81.25
Democratic	Candice Britton	8,546	18.75
Total votes		45,587	100.00

=== Republican primary results ===
Republican primary results
Party	Candidate	Votes	%
Republican	Robyn Hamlin	10,305	63.21
Republican	Martin Baker	4,532	27.80
Republican	Marshall Works	1,467	9.00
Total votes		16,304	100.00

=== Libertarian primary results ===
Libertarian primary results
Party	Candidate	Votes	%
Libertarian	Julie Stone	150	51.55
Libertarian	Robb E. Cunningham	141	48.45
Total votes		291	100.00

==== Predictions ====
Source	Ranking	As of
The Cook Political Report	Safe D	November 1, 2010
Rothenberg	Safe D	November 1, 2010
Sabato's Crystal Ball	Safe D	November 1, 2010
RCP	Safe D	November 1, 2010
CQ Politics	Safe D	October 28, 2010
New York Times	Safe D	November 1, 2010
FiveThirtyEight	Safe D	November 1, 2010

=== General election results ===
Missouri's 1st district general election, November 2, 2010
Party	Candidate	Votes	%
Democratic	William Lacy Clay, Jr. (incumbent)	135,907	73.55
Republican	Robyn Hamlin	43,649	23.62
Libertarian	Julie Stone	5,223	2.83
Total votes		184,779	100.00

=== External links ===
- "Martin Baker campaign website". Archived from the original on February 6, 2010.
- "Candice Britton campaign website". Archived from the original on October 17, 2010.
- "William Lacy Clay, Jr. campaign website". Archived from the original on August 17, 2010.
- "Robb Cunningham campaign website". Archived from the original on September 8, 2010.
- "Robyn Hamlin campaign website". Archived from the original on October 28, 2010.

== District 2 ==
2010 Missouri's 2nd congressional district election
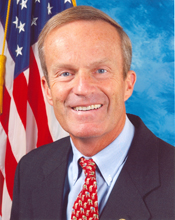

Nominee	Todd Akin	Arthur Lieber
Party	Republican	Democratic
Popular vote	180,481	77,467
Percentage	67.9%	29.2%
- County results Akin: 60–70%
U.S. Representative before election
Todd Akin
Republican
Elected U.S. Representative
Todd Akin
Republican

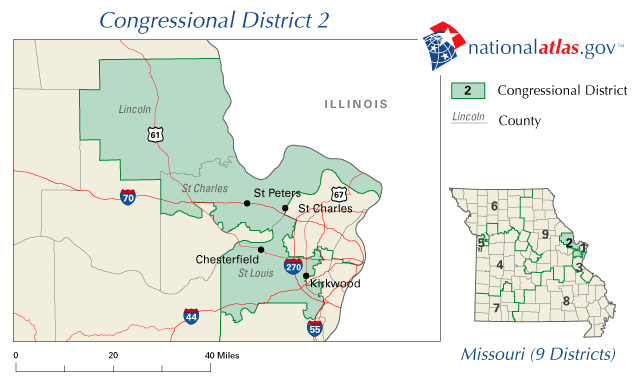
Missouri's 2nd congressional district in 2010

The 2nd district included Ballwin, Chesterfield, St. Charles, Wildwood and parts of O'Fallon, St. Peters and Wentzville. The district's population was 91 percent white (see Race and ethnicity in the United States); 93 percent were high school graduates and 42 percent had received a bachelor's degree or higher. Its median income was $73,641. In the 2008 presidential election the district gave 55 percent of its vote to Republican nominee John McCain and 44 percent to Democratic nominee Barack Obama.

Republican Todd Akin, who took office in 2001, was the incumbent. Akin was re-elected in 2008 with 62 percent of the vote. In 2010 Akin's opponent in the general election was Democratic nominee Arthur Lieber, the co-founder of the Crossroads College Preparatory School. Libertarian Party nominee Steve Mosbacher also ran. Bill Haas and Jeffrey Lowe also sought the Republican nomination. Liz Lauber, a government and industry relations communications consultant for Wells Fargo, ended her campaign for the Republican nomination in April 2010. Lieber was unopposed for the Democratic nomination.

Akin raised $767,798 and spent $825,668. Lieber raised $50,504 and spent $49,234. Haas raised $33,372 and spent $13,449. Lauber raised $6,724 and spent the same amount.

Prior to the election FiveThirtyEight's forecast gave Akin a 100 percent chance of winning, and projected that he would receive 68 percent of the vote to Lieber's 29 percent. On election day Akin was re-elected with 68 percent of the vote to Lieber's 29 percent. In 2011 Lieber wrote and published a book about his campaign entitled An Unlikely Candidate: Reflections on My Run for Office. Akin unsuccessfully ran for the U.S. Senate in 2012. He was succeeded by Republican Ann Wagner.

=== Republican primary results ===
Republican primary results
Party	Candidate	Votes	%
Republican	Todd Akin (incumbent)	72,269	84.57
Republican	Bill Haas	9,494	11.11
Republican	Jeffrey Lowe	3,692	4.32
Total votes		85,455	100.00

==== Predictions ====
Source	Ranking	As of
The Cook Political Report	Safe R	November 1, 2010
Rothenberg	Safe R	November 1, 2010
Sabato's Crystal Ball	Safe R	November 1, 2010
RCP	Safe R	November 1, 2010
CQ Politics	Safe R	October 28, 2010
New York Times	Safe R	November 1, 2010
FiveThirtyEight	Safe R	November 1, 2010

=== General election results ===
Missouri's 2nd district general election, November 2, 2010
Party	Candidate	Votes	%
Republican	Todd Akin (incumbent)	180,481	67.94
Democratic	Arthur Lieber	77,467	29.16
Libertarian	Steve Mosbacher	7,677	2.89
Write-In	Patrick M. Cannon	7	0.00
Total votes		265,632	100.00

=== Further reading ===
- Lieber, Arthur (May 5, 2011). An Unlikely Candidate: Reflections on My Run for Congress. eBookIt.com. ISBN 978-1-4566-0268-0.

=== External links ===
- "Todd Akin campaign website". Archived from the original on October 28, 2010.
- "Arthur Lieber campaign website". Archived from the original on October 28, 2010.
- "Steve Mosbacher campaign website". Archived from the original on October 31, 2010.

== District 3 ==
2010 Missouri's 3rd congressional district election
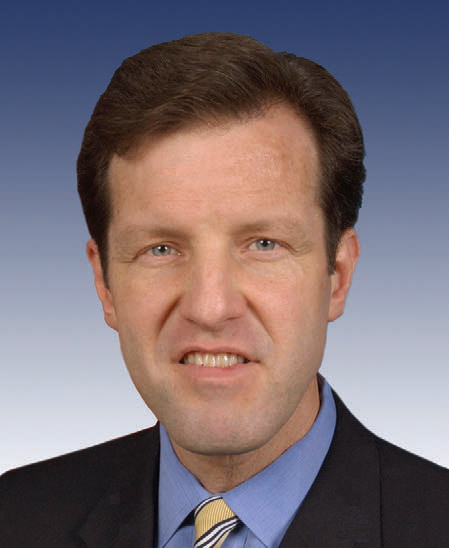

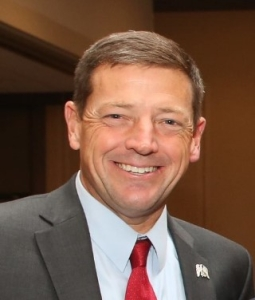
Nominee	Russ Carnahan	Ed Martin
Party	Democratic	Republican
Popular vote	99,398	94,757
Percentage	48.9%	46.7%
- County results Carnahan: 40–50% 60–70% Martin: 50–60%
U.S. Representative before election
Russ Carnahan
Democratic
Elected U.S. Representative
Russ Carnahan
Democratic

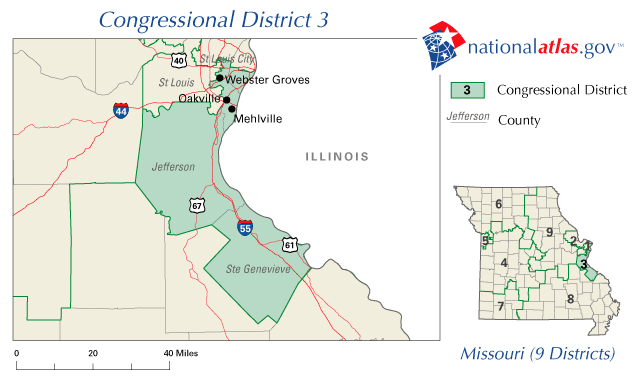
Missouri's 3rd congressional district in 2010

The 3rd district included Oakville and part of St. Louis. The district's population was 85 percent white and 9 percent black (see Race and ethnicity in the United States); 86 percent were high school graduates and 27 percent had received a bachelor's degree or higher. Its median income was $51,192. In the 2008 presidential election the district gave 60 percent of its vote to Democratic nominee Barack Obama and 39 percent to Republican nominee John McCain.

Democrat Russ Carnahan, who took office in 2005, was the incumbent. Carnahan was re-elected in 2008 with 66 percent of the vote. In 2010 Carnahan's opponent in the general election was Republican nominee Ed Martin, a former chief of staff to Governor of Missouri Matt Blunt. Constitution Party nominee Nick Ivanovich and Libertarian Party nominee Steven Hedrick also ran. David Arnold and Edward Crim also sought the Democratic nomination. John Wayne Tucker and Rusty Wallace, a computer-aided design technician, also sought the Republican nomination.

Carnahan raised $2,127,173 and spent $2,276,619. Martin raised $1,539,980 and spent $1,514,663. Arnold raised $907 and spent $904. Tucker raised $9,125 and spent $9,124.

A poll of 400 likely voters, conducted by Ayres, McHenry & Associates on August 16, 17 and 20, 2010, found Carnahan leading with 54 percent to Martin's 38 percent, while 8 percent were undecided. In a poll of 1,089 registered voters, conducted on August 17, 2010, by We Ask America, found Carnahan leading with 48 percent to Martin's 39 percent, while 13 percent were undecided.

On election day Carnahan was re-elected with 49 percent of the vote to Martin's 47 percent. Martin conceded on November 8. Carnahan unsuccessfully sought re-election in 2012. The same year Martin unsuccessfully ran for Missouri Attorney General.

=== Democratic primary results ===
Democratic primary results
Party	Candidate	Votes	%
Democratic	Russ Carnahan (incumbent)	36,976	80.14
Democratic	David Arnold	6,467	14.02
Democratic	Edward Crim	2,697	5.85
Total votes		46,140	100.00

=== Republican primary results ===
Republican primary results
Party	Candidate	Votes	%
Republican	Ed Martin	22,266	63.39
Republican	Rusty Wallace	7,478	21.29
Republican	John Wayne Tucker	5,379	15.31
Total votes		35,123	100.00

==== Predictions ====
Source	Ranking	As of
The Cook Political Report	Lean D	November 1, 2010
Rothenberg	Likely D	November 1, 2010
Sabato's Crystal Ball	Likely D	November 1, 2010
RCP	Lean D	November 1, 2010
CQ Politics	Likely D	October 28, 2010
New York Times	Safe D	November 1, 2010
FiveThirtyEight	Safe D	November 1, 2010

=== General election results ===
Missouri's 3rd district general election, November 2, 2010
Party	Candidate	Votes	%
Democratic	Russ Carnahan (incumbent)	99,398	48.94
Republican	Ed Martin	94,757	46.66
Libertarian	Steven Hedrick	5,772	2.84
Constitution	Nick Ivanovich	3,155	1.55
Write-In	Brian Wallner	3	0.00
Total votes		203,085	100.00

=== External links ===
- "Russ Carnahan campaign website". Archived from the original on October 28, 2010.
- "Edward Crim campaign website". Archived from the original on August 29, 2010.
- "Nick Ivanovich campaign website". Archived from the original on November 4, 2010.
- "Ed Martin campaign website". Archived from the original on October 28, 2010.
- "John Wayne Tucker campaign website". Archived from the original on May 12, 2010.

== District 4 ==
2010 Missouri's 4th congressional district election

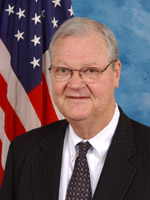
Nominee	Vicky Hartzler	Ike Skelton
Party	Republican	Democratic
Popular vote	113,489	101,532
Percentage	50.4%	45.1%
- County results Hartzler: 40–50% 50–60% 60–70% Skelton: 40–50% 50–60% 60–70%
U.S. Representative before election
Ike Skelton
Democratic
Elected U.S. Representative
Vicky Hartzler
Republican

The 4th district included Sedalia and part of Jefferson City. The district's population was 91 percent white (see Race and ethnicity in the United States census); 85 percent were high school graduates and 17 percent had received a bachelor's degree or higher. Its median income was $42,317. In the 2008 presidential election the district gave 61 percent of its vote to Republican nominee John McCain and 38 percent to Democratic nominee Barack Obama.

Democrat Ike Skelton, who took office in 1977, was the incumbent. Skelton was re-elected in 2008 with 66 percent of the vote. In 2010 Skelton's opponent in the general election was Republican nominee Vicky Hartzler, a former member of the Missouri General Assembly. Constitution Party nominee Greg Cowan and Libertarian Party nominee Jason Michael Braun also ran. Leonard Steinman, a salvage dealer and perennial candidate, also sought the Democratic nomination. Brian Clark; Arthur Madden; Eric McElroy; Jeff Parnell; Brian Riley; James Scholz; Bill Stouffer, a member of the Missouri Senate; and Roy Viessman, a former member of the Jefferson City Council, also sought the Republican nomination. Thomas Holbrook also sought the Libertarian nomination.

Skelton raised $2,923,038 and spent $3,107,552. Hartzler raised $1,373,530 and spent $1,351,176. Cowan raised $1,369 and spent $2,320. Madden raised $19,596 and spent the same amount. Riley raised $44,655 and spent $44,654. Scholz raised $31,208 and spent $31,081. Stouffer raised $464,174 and spent $460,777.

In a poll of 1,207 registered voters, conducted by We Ask America on August 17, 2010, Skelton led with 45 percent to Hartzler's 42 percent, while 13 percent were undecided. A poll of 187 registered voters, conducted by KY3 and Missouri State University (MSU) between August 7 and 22, 2010, found 47 percent supported Skelton while 35 percent favored Hartzler and 2 percent were undecided. In a poll of 300 likely voters, conducted in October 2010 by Wilson Research Strategies, Hartzler and Skelton were tied with 42 percent apiece. A poll of 159 likely voters, conducted by MSU's Center for Social Sciences and Policy Research between October 20 and 27, 2010, found Skelton led with 46 percent to Hartzler's 39 percent, while 14 percent were undecided and 2 percent supported other candidates.

Prior to the election, FiveThirtyEight's forecast gave Hartzler a 52 percent chance of winning and projected that she would receive 50 percent of the vote to Skelton's 48 percent. On election day, Hartzler was elected with 50 percent of the vote to Skelton's 45 percent. Hartzler was re-elected in 2012 and 2014. Skelton died in October 2013.

=== Democratic primary results ===
Democratic primary results
Party	Candidate	Votes	%
Democratic	Ike Skelton (incumbent)	25,919	80.53
Democratic	Leonard Steinman	6,268	19.47
Total votes		32,187	100.00

=== Republican primary results ===
Republican primary results
Party	Candidate	Votes	%
Republican	Vicky Hartzler	35,860	40.46
Republican	Bill Stouffer	26,573	29.98
Republican	Jeff Parnell	7,969	9.00
Republican	James Scholz	4,259	4.81
Republican	Roy Viessman	3,702	4.18
Republican	Brian Riley	3,197	3.61
Republican	Brian Clark	2,658	3.00
Republican	Arthur Madden	2,484	2.80
Republican	Eric McElroy	1,928	2.18
Total votes		88,630	100.00

=== Libertarian primary results ===
Libertarian primary results
Party	Candidate	Votes	%
Libertarian	Jason Michael Braun	165	50.61
Libertarian	Thomas Holbrook	161	49.39
Total votes		326	100.00

==== Predictions ====
Source	Ranking	As of
The Cook Political Report	Tossup	November 1, 2010
Rothenberg	Tossup	November 1, 2010
Sabato's Crystal Ball	Lean D	November 1, 2010
RCP	Tossup	November 1, 2010
CQ Politics	Tossup	October 28, 2010
New York Times	Lean D	November 1, 2010
FiveThirtyEight	Tossup	November 1, 2010

=== General election results ===
Missouri's 4th district general election, November 2, 2010
Party	Candidate	Votes	%
Republican	Vicky Hartzler	113,489	50.43
Democratic	Ike Skelton (incumbent)	101,532	45.11
Libertarian	Jason Michael Braun	6,123	2.72
Constitution	Greg Cowan	3,912	1.74
Total votes		225,056	100.00

=== External links ===
- "Greg Cowan campaign website". Archived from the original on October 28, 2010.
- "Vicky Hartzler campaign website". Archived from the original on October 28, 2010.
- "Arthur Madden campaign website". Archived from the original on September 24, 2010.
- "Jeff Parnell campaign website". Archived from the original on July 21, 2010.
- "Ike Skelton campaign website". Archived from the original on October 29, 2010.
- "Bill Stouffer campaign website". Archived from the original on March 28, 2010.

== District 5 ==
2010 Missouri's 5th congressional district election
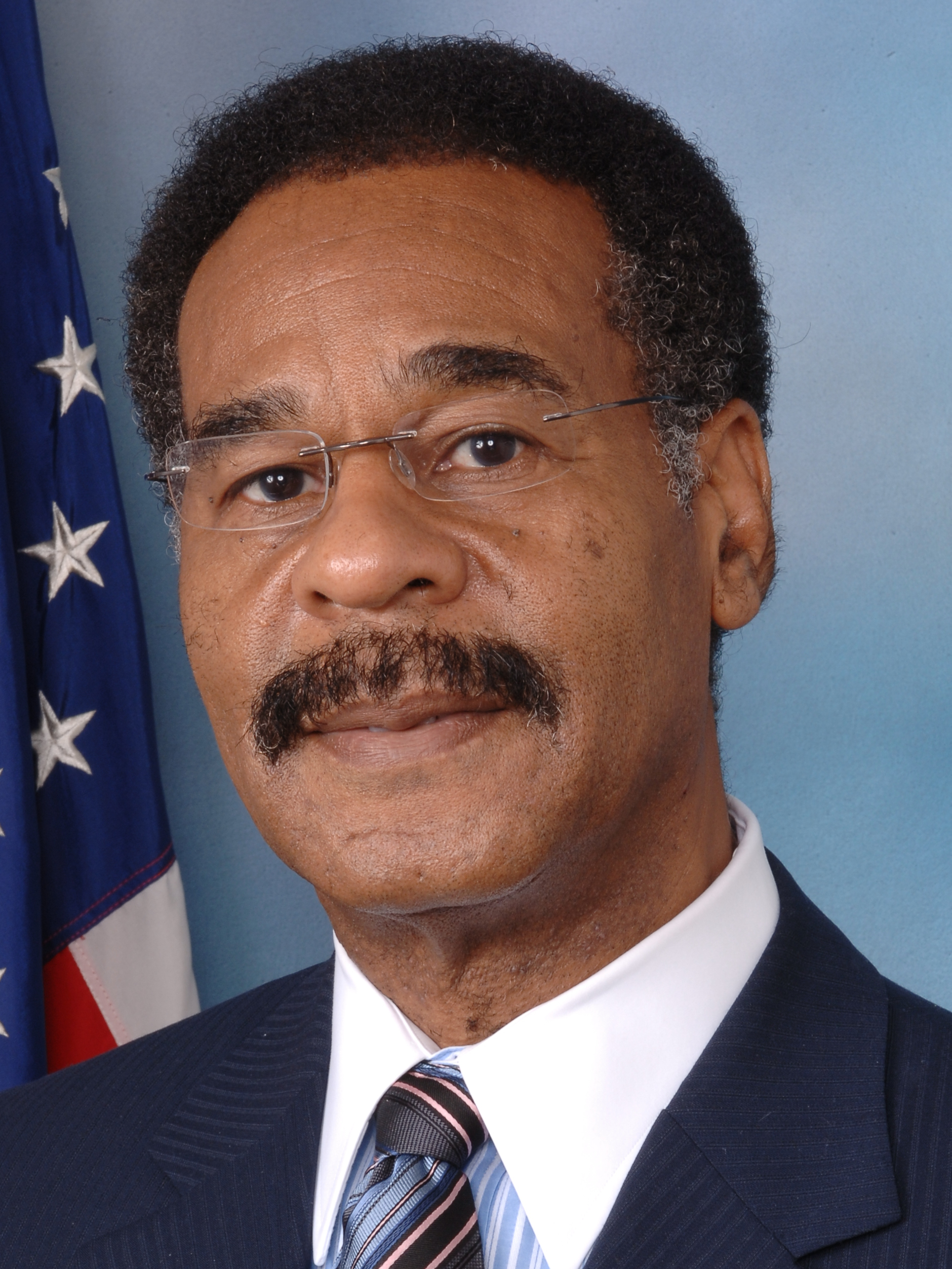

Nominee	Emanuel Cleaver	Jacob Turk
Party	Democratic	Republican
Popular vote	102,076	84,578
Percentage	53.3%	44.2%
U.S. Representative before election
Emanuel Cleaver
Democratic
Elected U.S. Representative
Emanuel Cleaver
Democratic

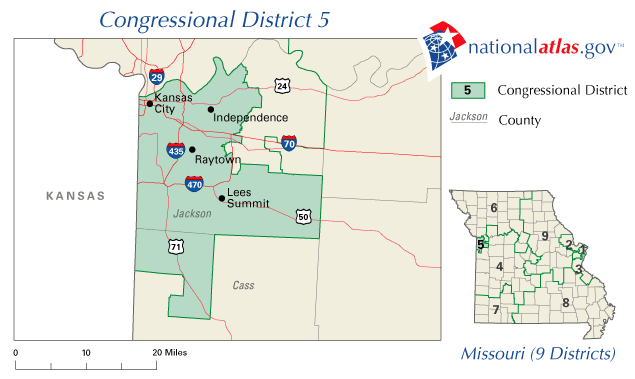
Missouri's 5th congressional district in 2010

The 5th district included Belton, Grandview, Raytown, and parts of Independence, Kansas City and Lee's Summit. The district's population was 64 percent white, 24 percent black and 8 percent Hispanic (see Race and ethnicity in the United States census); 87 percent were high school graduates and 26 percent had received a bachelor's degree or higher. Its median income was $45,213. In the 2008 presidential election the district gave 63 percent of its vote to Democratic nominee Barack Obama and 36 percent to Republican nominee John McCain.

Democrat Emanuel Cleaver, who took office in 2005, was the incumbent. Cleaver was re-elected in 2008 with 64 percent of the vote. In 2010 Cleaver's opponent in the general election was Republican nominee Jacob Turk, who also ran in 2006 and 2008. Constitution Party nominee Dave Lay and Libertarian Party nominee Randall D. Langkraehr also ran. Jerry Fowler; Patrick Haake; Ron Shawd, a former car dealer; and Ralph Sheffield also sought the Republican nomination. Cleaver was unopposed for the Democratic nomination.

Cleaver raised $637,380 and spent $607,575. Turk raised $274,423 and spent $258,627. In a poll of 500 likely voters, conducted by Pulse Opinion Research (a service run by Rasmussen Reports), found 52 percent supported Cleaver while 43 percent backed Turk. FiveThirtyEight's forecast gave Cleaver a 100 percent chance of winning and projected that he would receive 59 percent of the vote to Turk's 39 percent. On election day Cleaver was re-elected with 53 percent of the vote to Turk's 44 percent. Cleaver was re-elected, again over Turk, in 2012 and 2014.

=== Republican primary results ===
Republican primary results
Party	Candidate	Votes	%
Republican	Jacob Turk	23,078	67.00
Republican	Jerry Fowler	3,963	11.51
Republican	Patrick Haake	3,469	10.07
Republican	Ralph Sheffield	2,748	7.98
Republican	Ron Shawd	1,185	3.44
Total votes		34,443	100.00

==== Predictions ====
Source	Ranking	As of
The Cook Political Report	Safe D	November 1, 2010
Rothenberg	Safe D	November 1, 2010
Sabato's Crystal Ball	Safe D	November 1, 2010
RCP	Likely D	November 1, 2010
CQ Politics	Safe D	October 28, 2010
New York Times	Safe D	November 1, 2010
FiveThirtyEight	Safe D	November 1, 2010

=== General election results ===
Missouri's 5th district general election, November 2, 2010
Party	Candidate	Votes	%
Democratic	Emanuel Cleaver	102,076	53.32
Republican	Jacob Turk	84,578	44.18
Libertarian	Randall D. Langkraehr	3,077	1.61
Constitution	Dave Lay	1,692	0.88
Total votes		191,423	100.00

=== External links ===
- "Patrick Haake campaign website". Archived from the original on August 15, 2010.
- "Randall D. Langkkraehr campaign website". Archived from the original on October 28, 2010.
- "Dave Lay campaign website". Archived from the original on October 28, 2010.
- "Jacob Turk campaign website". Archived from the original on October 29, 2010.

== District 6 ==
2010 Missouri's 6th congressional district election
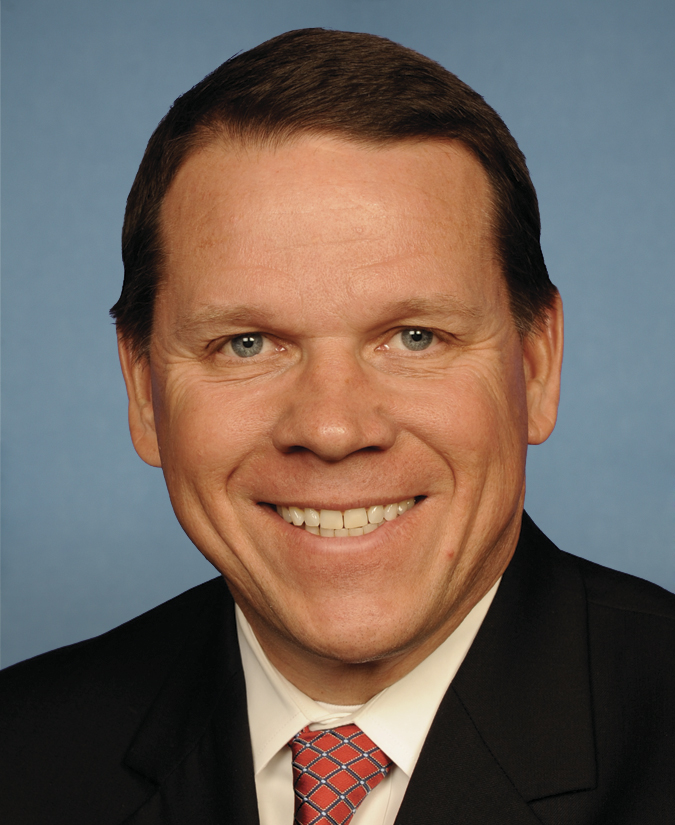

Nominee	Sam Graves	Clint Hylton
Party	Republican	Democratic
Popular vote	154,103	67,762
Percentage	69.4%	30.5%
- County results Graves: 60–70% 70–80% 80–90%
U.S. Representative before election
Sam Graves
Republican
Elected U.S. Representative
Sam Graves
Republican

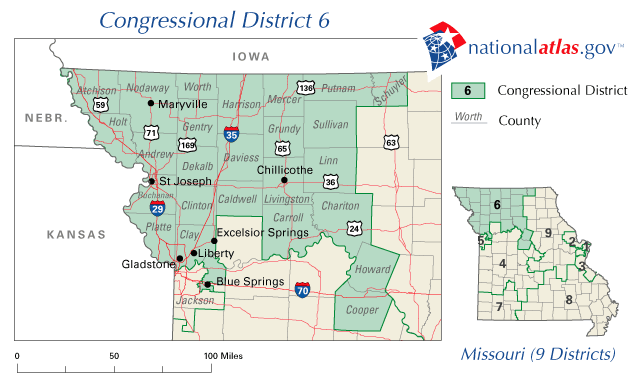
Missouri's 6th congressional district in 2010

The 6th district included St. Joseph and parts of Blue Springs and Kansas City. The district's population was 90 percent white (see Race and ethnicity in the United States census); 89 percent were high school graduates and 25 percent had received a bachelor's degree or higher. Its median income was $51,899. In the 2008 presidential election the district gave 54 percent of its vote to Republican nominee John McCain and 45 percent to Democratic nominee Barack Obama.

Republican Sam Graves, who took office in 2001, was the incumbent. In 2010 Graves's opponent in the general election was Democratic nominee Clint Hylton, an insurance salesman. Write-in candidate Kyle Yarber also ran. Christopher Ryan also sought the Republican nomination. Hylton was unopposed for the Democratic nomination.

Graves raised $1,057,245 and spent $1,071,726. Hylton raised $9,461 and spent $9,394. Yarber raised $16,602 and spent $16,601.

Prior to the election FiveThirtyEight's forecast gave Graves a 100 percent chance of winning and projected that he would receive 66 percent of the vote to Hylton's 31 percent. On election day Graves was re-elected with 69 percent of the vote to Hylton's 31 percent. Graves was again re-elected in 2012 and 2014.

=== Republican primary results ===
Republican primary results
Party	Candidate	Votes	%
Republican	Sam Graves (incumbent)	54,566	82.46
Republican	Christopher Ryan	11,608	17.54
Total votes		66,174	100.00

==== Predictions ====
Source	Ranking	As of
The Cook Political Report	Safe R	November 1, 2010
Rothenberg	Safe R	November 1, 2010
Sabato's Crystal Ball	Safe R	November 1, 2010
RCP	Safe R	November 1, 2010
CQ Politics	Safe R	October 28, 2010
New York Times	Safe R	November 1, 2010
FiveThirtyEight	Safe R	November 1, 2010

=== General election results ===
Missouri's 6th district general election, November 2, 2010
Party	Candidate	Votes	%
Republican	Sam Graves (incumbent)	154,103	69.44
Democratic	Clint Hylton	67,762	30.54
Write-In	Kyle Yarber	47	0.02
Total votes		221,912	100.00

=== External links ===
- "Sam Graves campaign website". Archived from the original on October 28, 2010.
- "Clint Hylton campaign website". Archived from the original on October 29, 2010.
- "Christopher Ryan campaign website". Archived from the original on October 15, 2010.

== District 7 ==
2010 Missouri's 7th congressional district election
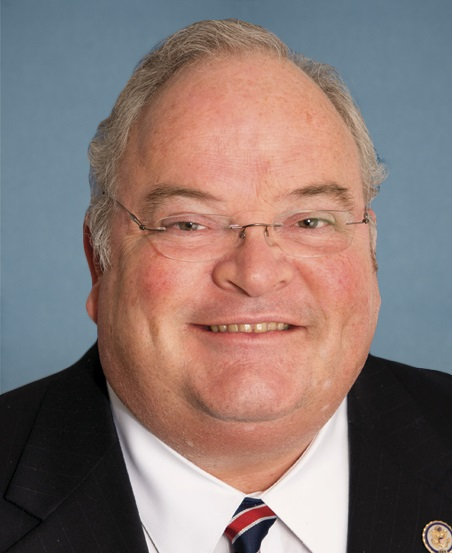

Nominee	Billy Long	Scott Eckersley	Kevin Craig
Party	Republican	Democratic	Libertarian
Popular vote	141,010	67,545	13,866
Percentage	63.4%	30.4%	6.2%
- County results Long: 50–60% 60–70% 70–80%
U.S. Representative before election
Roy Blunt
Republican
Elected U.S. Representative
Billy Long
Republican

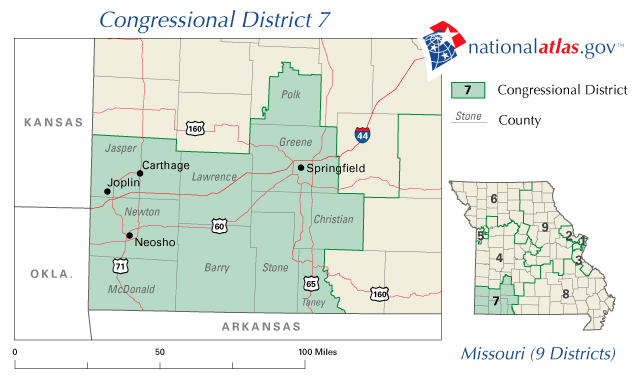
Missouri's 7th congressional district in 2010

The 7th district included Joplin and Springfield. The district's population was 90 percent white (see Race and ethnicity in the United States census); 85 percent were high school graduates and 22 percent had received a bachelor's degree or higher. Its median income was $41,452. In the 2008 presidential election, the district gave 63 percent of its vote to Republican nominee John McCain and 35 percent to Democratic nominee Barack Obama.

Republican Roy Blunt, who took office in 1997, was the incumbent. Blunt, the father of Governor Matt Blunt, was re-elected in 2008 with 68 percent of the vote. In 2010 he ran for the U.S. Senate rather than seeking re-election.

The candidates in the general election were Republican nominee Billy Long, an auctioneer; and Democratic nominee Scott Eckersley, an attorney who previously worked for Governor Blunt. Libertarian Party nominee Kevin Craig and write-in candidate Nicholas Ladendorf also ran.

Jack Goodman, a member of the Missouri Senate; Steve Hunter, a former member of the Missouri House of Representatives; Mike Moon, a farmer; Darrell Moore, the Greene County prosecuting attorney; Gary Nodler, a member of the Missouri Senate; Michael Wardell, a small business owner; and Jeff Wisdom, an Iraq War veteran, also sought the Republican nomination. Sarah Steelman, the former State Treasurer of Missouri, announced in September 2009 that she would not run in the 7th district in 2010. Tim Davis, an attorney, also sought the Democratic nomination.

Long raised $1,260,007 and spent $1,230,604. Eckersley raised $186,310 and spent the same amount. Goodman raised $482,233 and spent $478,534. Moon raised $25,279 and spent $25,278. Moore raised $45,424 and spent $44,977. Nodler raised $383,130 and spent $380,240. Wisdom raised $20,101 and spent $20,080. Davis raised $24,119 and spent $22,928.

In a poll of 198 registered voters, conducted by KY3 and Missouri State University (MSU) between August 7 and August 22, 2010, Long led with 51 percent to Eckersley's 23 percent. A poll of 199 likely voters, conducted by MSU's Center for Social Sciences and Public olicy Research between October 20 and 27, 2010, found Long leading with 56 percent to Eckersley's 23 percent while 7 percent supported Craig, 1 percent favored other candidates, and 13 percent were undecided. Prior to the election FiveThirtyEight's forecast gave Long a 100 percent chance of winning and projected that he would receive 69 percent of the vote to Eckersley's 28 percent. Eckersley increased his share of the voting to more than 30 percent, but Long was elected with 63 percent of the vote. Long was re-elected in 2012 and 2014.

On October 29, 2010, an email was sent to local media, purportedly by Eckersley, which falsely claimed that he had ended his campaign. At least one television station inaccurately reported the story as fact. Eckersley later filed a complaint with the Federal Election Commission (FEC) alleging that Long may have been involved in the hoax. The FEC investigated and reported in 2013 that the emails had come from Patrick Binning, a political consultant, and that Binning had acted independently of Long's campaign. As the FEC found no evidence that Long's campaign or the Republican Party was involved, under the law electoral fraud had not occurred.

=== Republican primary results ===
Republican primary results
Party	Candidate	Votes	%
Republican	Billy Long	38,218	36.56
Republican	Jack Goodman	30,401	29.08
Republican	Gary Nodler	14,561	13.93
Republican	Darrell Moore	9,312	13.93
Republican	Jeff Wisdom	4,552	4.35
Republican	Mike Moon	4,473	4.28
Republican	Steve Hunter	2,173	2.08
Republican	Michael Wardell	844	0.81
Total votes		104,534	100.00

=== Democratic primary results ===
Democratic primary results
Party	Candidate	Votes	%
Democratic	Scott Eckersley	9,210	62.66
Democratic	Tim Davis	5,489	37.34
Total votes		14,699	100.00

==== Predictions ====
Source	Ranking	As of
The Cook Political Report	Safe R	November 1, 2010
Rothenberg	Safe R	November 1, 2010
Sabato's Crystal Ball	Safe R	November 1, 2010
RCP	Safe R	November 1, 2010
CQ Politics	Safe R	October 28, 2010
New York Times	Safe R	November 1, 2010
FiveThirtyEight	Safe R	November 1, 2010

=== General election results ===
Missouri's 7th district general election, November 2, 2010
Party	Candidate	Votes	%
Republican	Billy Long	141,010	63.39
Democratic	Scott Eckersley	67,545	30.37
Libertarian	Kevin Craig	13,866	6.23
Write-In	Nicholas Ladendorf	10	0.00
Total votes		222,431	100.00

=== External links ===
- "Kevin Craig campaign website". Archived from the original on November 1, 2010.
- "Tim Davis campaign website". Archived from the original on May 31, 2010.
- "Scott Eckersley campaign website". Archived from the original on October 29, 2010.
- "Jack Goodman campaign website". Archived from the original on August 4, 2010.
- "Nicholas Ladendorf campaign website". Archived from the original on October 15, 2010.
- "Billy Long campaign website". Archived from the original on November 2, 2010.
- "Mike Moon campaign website". Archived from the original on October 8, 2010.
- "Gary Nodler campaign website". Archived from the original on July 3, 2010.
- "Jeff Wisdom campaign website". Archived from the original on July 27, 2010.

== District 8 ==
2010 Missouri's 8th congressional district election
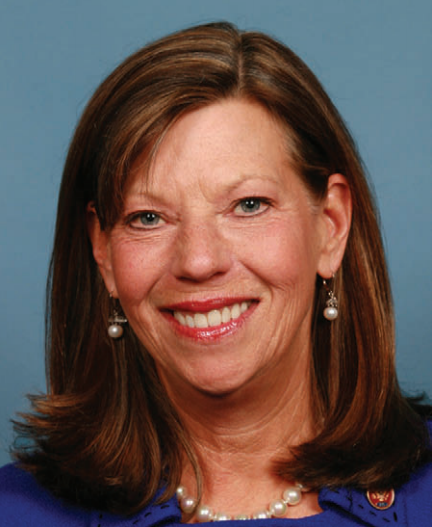

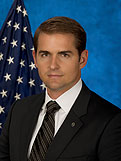
Nominee	Jo Ann Emerson	Tommy Sowers
Party	Republican	Democratic
Popular vote	128,499	56,377
Percentage	65.6%	28.8%
U.S. Representative before election
Jo Ann Emerson
Republican
Elected U.S. Representative
Jo Ann Emerson
Republican

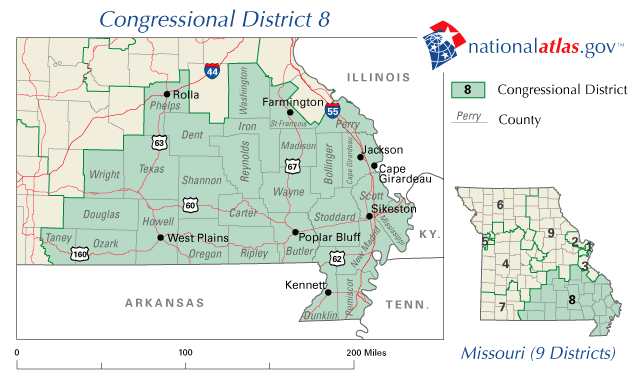
Missouri's 8th congressional district in 2010

The 8th district included Cape Girardeau, Poplar Bluff and Rolla. The district's population was 91 percent white and 5 percent black (see Race and ethnicity in the United States census); 77 percent were high school graduates and 14 percent had received a bachelor's degree or higher. Its median income was $34,454. In the 2008 presidential election the district gave 62 percent of its vote to Republican nominee John McCain and 36 percent to Democratic nominee Barack Obama.

Republican Jo Ann Emerson, who took office in 1996, was the incumbent. Emerson was re-elected with 71 percent of the vote in 2008. Emerson announced in January 2009 that she would not run for the U.S. Senate in 2010. In 2010 Emerson's opponent in the general election was Democratic nominee Tommy Sowers, a former member of the United States Army Special Forces. Independent candidate Larry Bill, a real estate investor and building contractor; and Libertarian Party nominee Rick Vandeven, a technician with Procter & Gamble, also ran. Bob Parker, a farmer, also sought the Republican nomination. Sowers was unopposed for the Democratic nomination.

Emerson raised $2,006,543 and spent $2,071,160. Sowers raised $1,588,389 and spent $1,572,930. Bill raised $15,630 and spent the same amount. Parker raised $38,565 and spent $37,472.

In a poll of 400 likely voters, conducted on April 19 and 20, 2010, by American Viewpoint (AV) for Emerson's campaign, Emerson led with 71 percent to Sowers's 18 percent. A poll of 171 registered voters, conducted by KY3 and Missouri State University between August 7 and 22, 2010, found Emerson leading with 64 percent to Sowers's 17 percent while 3 percent supported other candidates. An AV poll of 400 likely voters, conducted on September 13 and 14, 2010, found Emerson had the support of 63 percent while 24 percent backed Sowers.

Prior to the election FiveThirtyEight's forecast gave Emerson a 100 percent chance of winning and projected that she would receive 68 percent of the vote to Sowers's 29 percent. On election day Emerson was re-elected with 66 percent of the vote to Sowers's 29 percent. Emerson was again re-elected in 2012 and resigned from Congress in January 2013. She was succeeded by Jason T. Smith. In August 2012 Sowers was confirmed as Assistant Secretary for Public and Intergovernmental Affairs at the Department of Veterans Affairs.

=== Republican primary results ===
Republican primary results
Party	Candidate	Votes	%
Republican	Jo Ann Emerson (incumbent)	47,880	65.59
Republican	Bob Parker	25,118	34.41
Total votes		72,998	100.00

==== Predictions ====
Source	Ranking	As of
The Cook Political Report	Safe R	November 1, 2010
Rothenberg	Safe R	November 1, 2010
Sabato's Crystal Ball	Safe R	November 1, 2010
RCP	Safe R	November 1, 2010
CQ Politics	Safe R	October 28, 2010
New York Times	Safe R	November 1, 2010
FiveThirtyEight	Safe R	November 1, 2010

=== General election results ===
Missouri's 8th district general election, November 2, 2010
Party	Candidate	Votes	%
Republican	Jo Ann Emerson (incumbent)	128,499	65.56
Democratic	Tommy Sowers	56,377	28.76
Independent	Larry Bill	7,193	3.67
Libertarian	Rick Vandeven	3,930	2.01
Total votes		195,999	100.00

=== External links ===
- "Larry Bill campaign website". Archived from the original on October 28, 2010.
- "Jo Ann Emerson campaign website". Archived from the original on November 2, 2010.
- "Bob Parker campaign website". Archived from the original on September 19, 2010.
- "Tommy Sowers campaign website".

== District 9 ==
2010 Missouri's 9th congressional district election
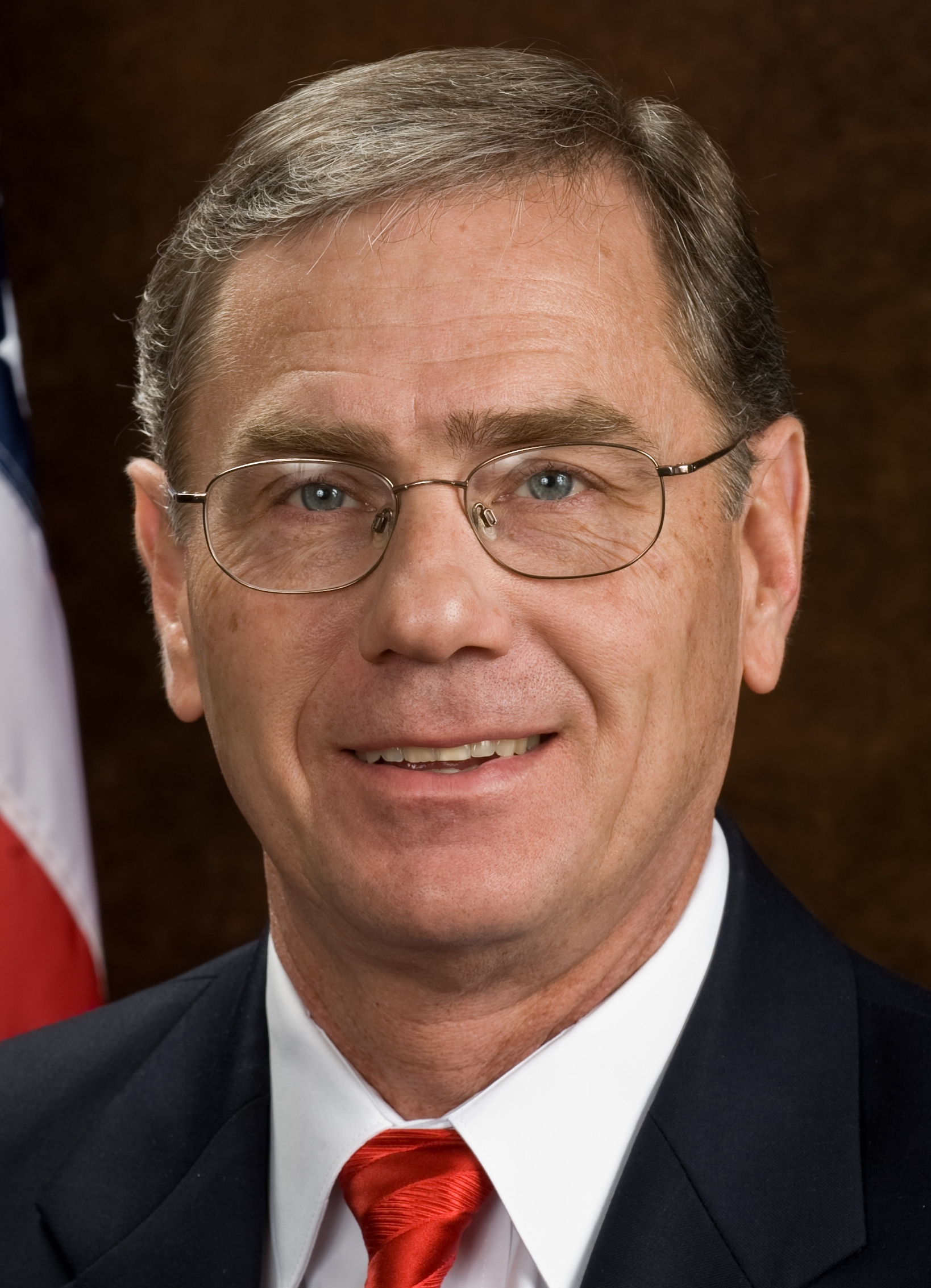

Nominee	Blaine Luetkemeyer	Christopher Dwyer
Party	Republican	Libertarian
Popular vote	162,724	46,817
Percentage	77.4%	22.3%
- County results Luetkemeyer: 60–70% 70–80% 80–90%
U.S. Representative before election
Blaine Luetkemeyer
Republican
Elected U.S. Representative
Blaine Luetkemeyer
Republican

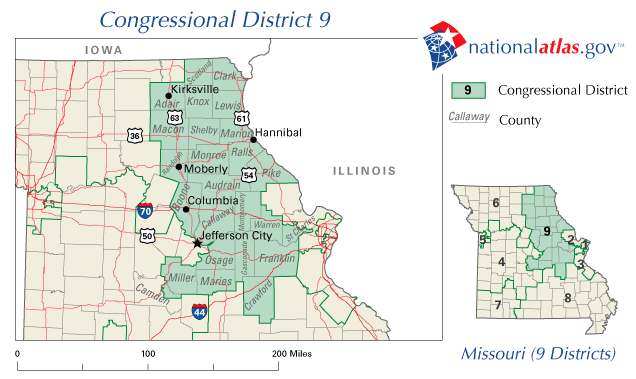
Missouri's 9th congressional district in 2010

The 9th district included Columbia, Hannibal and Kirksville. The district's population was 92 percent white (see Race and ethnicity in the United States census); 86 percent were high school graduates and 23 percent had received a bachelor's degree or higher. Its median income was $44,118. In the 2008 presidential election the district gave 55 percent of its vote to Republican nominee John McCain and 44 percent to Democratic nominee Barack Obama.

Republican Blaine Luetkemeyer, who took office in 2009, was the incumbent. Luetkemeyer was elected with 50 percent of the vote in 2008. In 2010 Luetkemeyer's opponent in the general election was Libertarian Party nominee Christopher Dwyer. The 2010 election in the 9th district marked the first time since 1984 that a U.S. Representative from Missouri ran unopposed in the general election. Ron Burrus and Jeff Reed also ran as write-in candidates. James O. Baker also sought the Republican nomination. Steven Wilson also sought the Libertarian nomination.

Luetkemeyer raised $1,358,842 and spent $737,857. Prior to the election FiveThirtyEight's forecast gave Luetkemeyer a 100 percent chance of winning. On election day Luetkemeyer was re-elected with 77 percent of the vote to Dwyer's 22 percent. Luetkemeyer was again re-elected in 2012 and 2014.

=== Republican primary results ===
Republican primary results
Party	Candidate	Votes	%
Republican	Blaine Luetkemeyer (incumbent)	59,684	82.97
Republican	James O. Baker	12,248	17.03
Total votes		71,932	100.00

=== Libertarian primary results ===
Libertarian primary results
Party	Candidate	Votes	%
Libertarian	Christopher Dwyer	291	55.96
Libertarian	Steven Wilson	229	44.04
Total votes		520	100.00

==== Predictions ====
Source	Ranking	As of
The Cook Political Report	Safe R	November 1, 2010
Rothenberg	Safe R	November 1, 2010
Sabato's Crystal Ball	Safe R	November 1, 2010
RCP	Safe R	November 1, 2010
CQ Politics	Safe R	October 28, 2010
New York Times	Safe R	November 1, 2010
FiveThirtyEight	Safe R	November 1, 2010

=== General election results ===
Missouri's 9th district general election, November 2, 2010
Party	Candidate	Votes	%
Republican	Blaine Luetkemeyer (incumbent)	162,724	77.36
Libertarian	Christopher Dwyer	46,817	22.26
Write-In	Jeff Reed	748	0.36
Write-In	Ron Burrus	69	0.03
Total votes		210,358	100.00

=== External links ===
- "Christopher Dwyer campaign website". Archived from the original on October 28, 2010.
- "Blaine Luetkemeyer campaign website". Archived from the original on October 28, 2010.

== See also ==
- List of United States representatives from Missouri
- Missouri's congressional delegations
