= 2014 United States House of Representatives elections in Missouri =

- November 4, 2014

All 8 Missouri seats to the United States House of Representatives
	Majority party	Minority party
Party	Republican	Democratic
Last election	6	2
Seats won	6	2
Seat change	Steady	Steady
Popular vote	838,283	513,600
Percentage	58.77%	36.01%
Swing	▲4.07%	▼5.83%

Republican
40–50%
50–60%
60–70%
70–80%
80–90%
Democratic
50–60%
70–80%

The 2014 United States House of Representatives elections in Missouri were held on Tuesday, November 4, 2014, to elect the eight U.S. representatives from the state of Missouri, one from each of the state's eight congressional districts.

== Overview ==
United States House of Representatives elections in Missouri, 2014
Party	Votes	Percentage	Seats before	Seats after	+/–
Republican	838,283	58.77%	6	6	-
Democratic	513,600	36.01%	2	2	-
Libertarian	63,682	4.46%	0	0	-
Independent	6,939	0.49%	0	0	-
Constitution	3,799	0.27%	0	0	-
Total	1,426,303	100.00%	8	8	—

=== District ===
Results of the 2014 United States House of Representatives elections in Missouri by district:

District	Republican		Democratic		Others		Total		Result
District	Votes	%	Votes	%	Votes	%	Votes	%	Result
District 1	35,273	21.57%	119,315	72.98%	8,906	5.45%	163,494	100.0%	Democratic hold
District 2	148,191	64.12%	75,384	32.62%	7,542	1.59%	231,117	100.0%	Republican hold
District 3	130,940	68.33%	52,021	27.15%	8,659	4.52%	191,620	100.0%	Republican hold
District 4	120,014	68.08%	46,464	26.36%	9,808	5.56%	176,286	100.0%	Republican hold
District 5	69,071	44.96%	79,256	51.59%	5,308	2.78%	153,635	100.0%	Democratic hold
District 6	124,616	66.65%	55,157	29.50%	7,197	3.85%	186,970	100.0%	Republican hold
District 7	104,054	63.46%	47,282	28.84%	12,621	7.70%	163,957	100.0%	Republican hold
District 8	106,124	66.65%	38,721	24.32%	14,379	9.03%	159,224	100.0%	Republican hold
Total	838,283	58.77%	513,600	36.01%	74,420	5.22%	1,426,303	100.0%	

== District 1 ==
2014 Missouri's 1st congressional district election
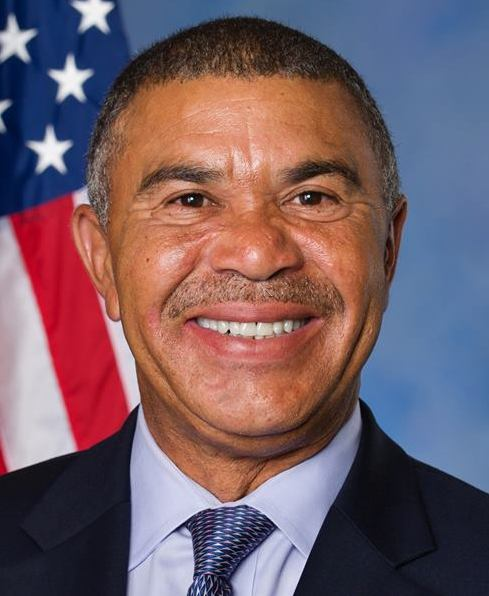

Nominee	Lacy Clay	Daniel J. Elder	Robb E. Cunningham
Party	Democratic	Republican	Libertarian
Popular vote	119,315	35,273	8,906
Percentage	73.0%	21.6%	5.4%
- Clay: 70–80%
U.S. Representative before election
Lacy Clay
Democratic
Elected U.S. Representative
Lacy Clay
Democratic

Incumbent Democrat Lacy Clay, who had represented the district since 2001, ran for re-election.

=== Democratic primary ===
==== Candidates ====
===== Nominee =====
- William Lacy Clay Jr., incumbent U.S. Representative

==== Results ====
Democratic primary results
Party	Candidate	Votes	%
Democratic	Lacy Clay (incumbent)	69,650	100.0

=== Republican primary ===
==== Candidates ====
===== Nominee =====
- Daniel Elder, network engineer

===== Eliminated in primary =====
- Martin Baker, political organizer and candidate for this seat in 2012
- David Koehr, retired Marine Corps lieutenant colonel

==== Results ====
Republican primary results
Party	Candidate	Votes	%
Republican	Daniel Elder	4,196	39.3
Republican	Martin Baker	3,659	34.2
Republican	David Koehr	2,833	26.5
Total votes		10,688	100.0

=== Libertarian primary ===
==== Candidates ====
===== Nominee =====
- Robb Cunningham

==== Results ====
Libertarian primary results
Party	Candidate	Votes	%
Libertarian	Robb E. Cunningham	465	100.0

=== General election ===
==== Predictions ====
Source	Ranking	As of
The Cook Political Report	Safe D	November 3, 2014
Rothenberg	Safe D	October 24, 2014
Sabato's Crystal Ball	Safe D	October 30, 2014
RCP	Safe D	November 2, 2014
Daily Kos Elections	Safe D	November 4, 2014

==== Results ====
Missouri's 1st congressional district, 2014
Party	Candidate	Votes	%
Democratic	Lacy Clay (incumbent)	119,315	73.0
Republican	Daniel J. Elder	35,273	21.6
Libertarian	Robb E. Cunningham	8,906	5.4
Total votes		163,494	100.0
Democratic hold			

== District 2 ==
2014 Missouri's 2nd congressional district election
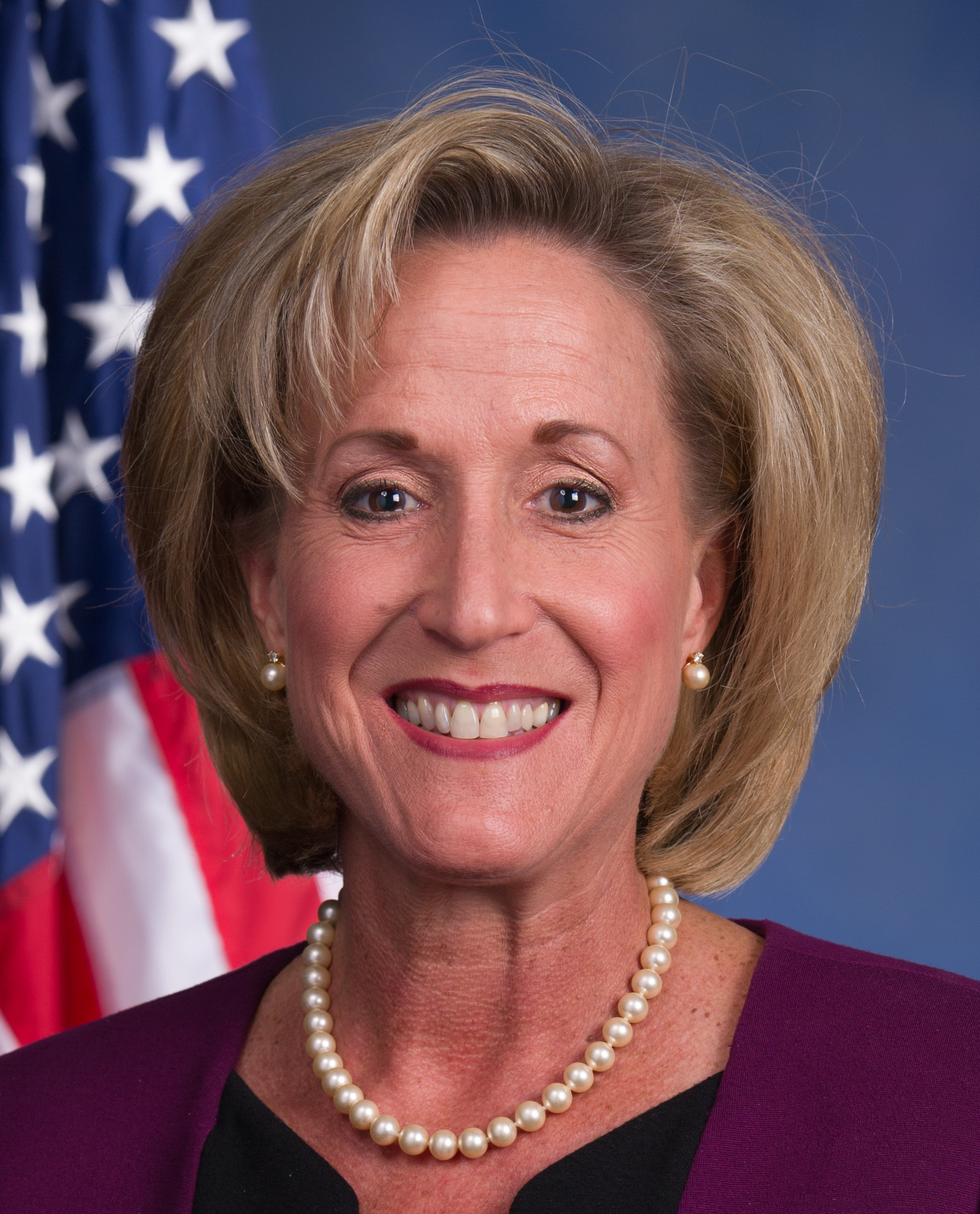

Nominee	Ann Wagner	Arthur Lieber
Party	Republican	Democratic
Popular vote	148,191	75,384
Percentage	64.1%	32.6%
- Wagner: 60–70%
U.S. Representative before election
Ann Wagner
Republican
Elected U.S. Representative
Ann Wagner
Republican

Incumbent Republican Ann Wagner, who had represented the district since 2013, ran for re-election.

=== Republican primary ===
==== Candidates ====
===== Nominee =====
- Ann Wagner, incumbent U.S. Representative

==== Results ====
Republican primary results
Party	Candidate	Votes	%
Republican	Ann Wagner (incumbent)	55,322	100.0

=== Democratic primary ===
==== Candidates ====
===== Nominee =====
- Arthur Lieber, educator and nominee for this seat in 2010

==== Results ====
Democratic primary results
Party	Candidate	Votes	%
Democratic	Arthur Lieber	54,557	100.0

=== Libertarian primary ===
==== Candidates ====
===== Nominee =====
- Bill Slantz, businessman and nominee for this seat in 2012

==== Results ====
Libertarian primary results
Party	Candidate	Votes	%
Libertarian	Bill Slantz	720	100.0

=== General election ===
==== Predictions ====
Source	Ranking	As of
The Cook Political Report	Safe R	November 3, 2014
Rothenberg	Safe R	October 24, 2014
Sabato's Crystal Ball	Safe R	October 30, 2014
RCP	Safe R	November 2, 2014
Daily Kos Elections	Safe R	November 4, 2014

==== Results ====
Missouri's 2nd congressional district, 2014
Party	Candidate	Votes	%
Republican	Ann Wagner (Incumbent)	148,191	64.1
Democratic	Arthur Lieber	75,384	32.6
Libertarian	Bill Slantz	7,542	3.3
Total votes		231,117	100.0
Republican hold			

== District 3 ==
2014 Missouri's 3rd congressional district election
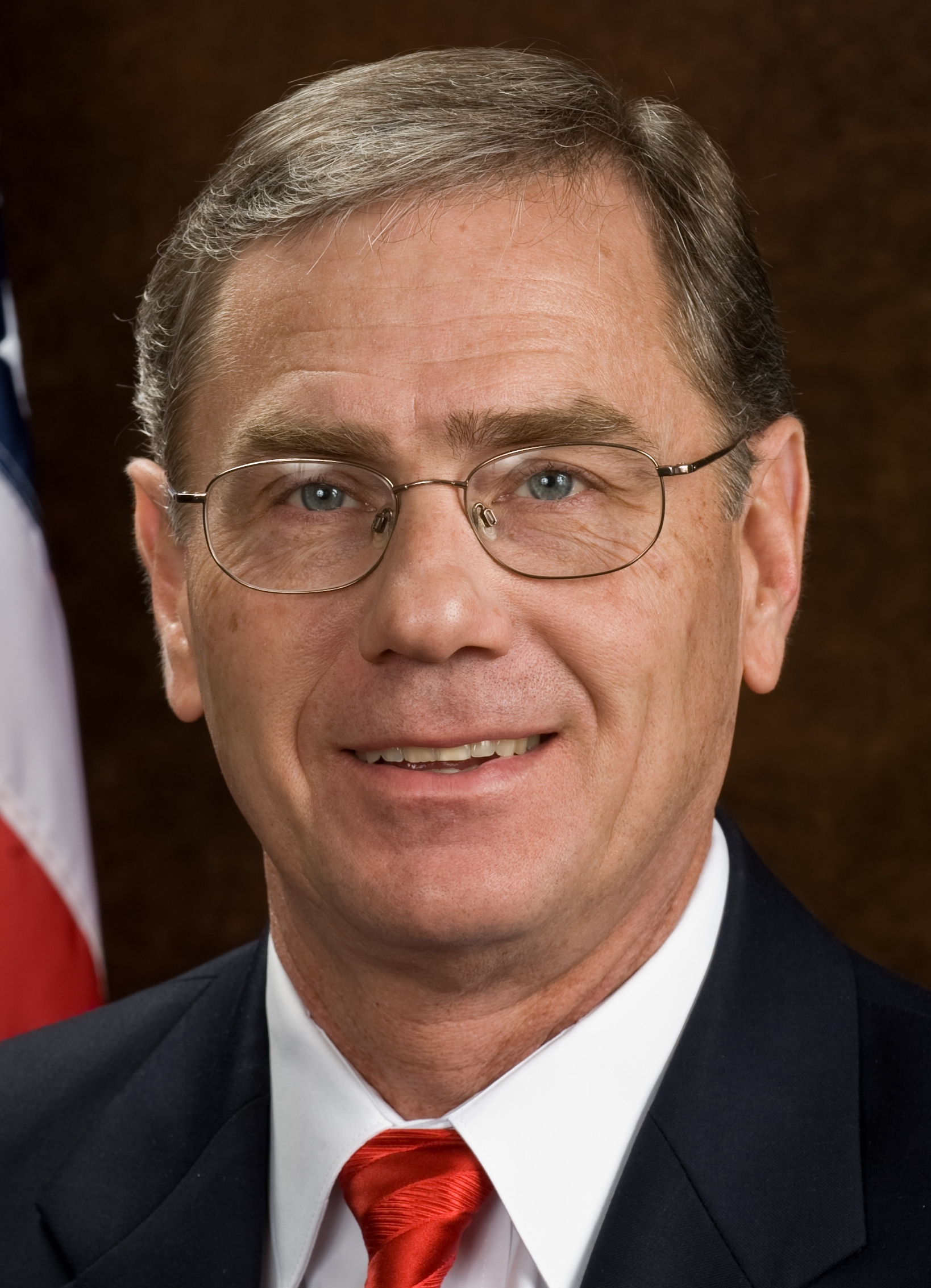

Nominee	Blaine Luetkemeyer	Courtney Denton
Party	Republican	Democratic
Popular vote	130,940	52,021
Percentage	68.3%	27.2%
- Luetkemeyer: 60–70% 70–80% 80–90%
U.S. Representative before election
Blaine Luetkemeyer
Republican
Elected U.S. Representative
Blaine Luetkemeyer
Republican

Incumbent Republican Blaine Luetkemeyer, who had represented the district since 2009, ran for re-election.

=== Republican primary ===
==== Candidates ====
===== Nominee =====
- Blaine Luetkemeyer, incumbent U.S. Representative

===== Eliminated in primary =====
- John Morris, candidate for 2nd District in 2012
- Leonard Steinman, truck driver

===== Withdrawn =====
- Joe Frost

==== Results ====
Republican primary results
Party	Candidate	Votes	%
Republican	Blaine Luetkemeyer (incumbent)	71,030	79.5
Republican	John Morris	9,786	10.9
Republican	Leonard Steinman	8,580	9.6
Total votes		89,396	100.0

=== Democratic primary ===
==== Candidates ====
===== Nominee =====
- Courtney Denton, teacher

===== Eliminated in primary =====
- Velma Steinman

==== Results ====
Democratic primary results
Party	Candidate	Votes	%
Democratic	Courtney Denton	15,987	57.1
Democratic	Velma Steinman	11,988	42.9
Total votes		27,975	100.0

=== Libertarian primary ===
==== Candidates ====
===== Nominee =====
- Steven Hedrick

==== Results ====
Libertarian primary results
Party	Candidate	Votes	%
Libertarian	Steven Hedrick	774	100.0

=== General election ===
==== Predictions ====
Source	Ranking	As of
The Cook Political Report	Safe R	November 3, 2014
Rothenberg	Safe R	October 24, 2014
Sabato's Crystal Ball	Safe R	October 30, 2014
RCP	Safe R	November 2, 2014
Daily Kos Elections	Safe R	November 4, 2014

==== Results ====
Missouri's 3rd congressional district, 2014
Party	Candidate	Votes	%
Republican	Blaine Luetkemeyer (incumbent)	130,940	68.3
Democratic	Courtney Denton	52,021	27.2
Libertarian	Steven Hedrick	8,593	4.5
Independent	Harold Davis (write-in)	66	0.0
Total votes		191,620	100.0
Republican hold			

== District 4 ==
2014 Missouri's 4th congressional district election
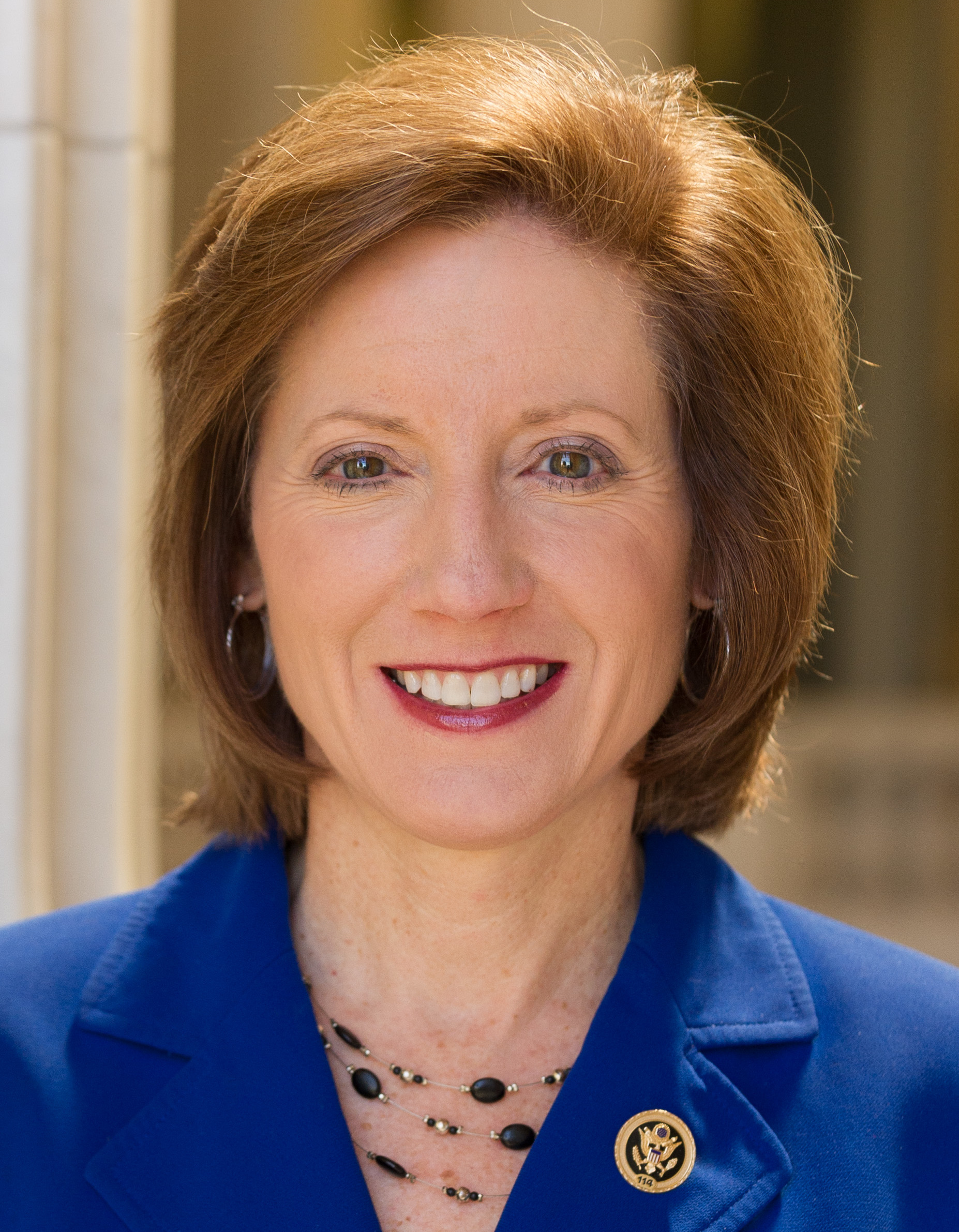

Nominee	Vicky Hartzler	Nate Irvin	Herschel L. Young
Party	Republican	Democratic	Libertarian
Popular vote	120,014	46,464	9,793
Percentage	68.1%	26.3%	5.6%
- Hartzler: 50–60% 60–70% 70–80% 80–90%
U.S. Representative before election
Vicky Hartzler
Republican
Elected U.S. Representative
Vicky Hartzler
Republican

Incumbent Republican Vicky Hartzler, who had represented the district since 2011, ran for re-election.

=== Republican primary ===
==== Candidates ====
===== Nominee =====
- Vicky Hartzler, incumbent U.S. Representative

===== Eliminated in primary =====
- John Webb, small business owner

==== Results ====
Republican primary results
Party	Candidate	Votes	%
Republican	Vicky Hartzler (incumbent)	65,404	74.7
Republican	John Webb	22,131	25.3
Total votes		87,535	100.0

=== Democratic primary ===
==== Candidates ====
===== Nominee =====
- Nate Irvin

===== Eliminated in primary =====
- Jim White

==== Results ====
Democratic primary results
Party	Candidate	Votes	%
Democratic	Nate Irvin	26,831	100.0

=== Libertarian primary ===
==== Candidates ====
===== Nominee =====
- Herschel L. Young, small business owner

===== Eliminated in primary =====
- Randy Langkraehr

==== Results ====
Libertarian primary results
Party	Candidate	Votes	%
Libertarian	Herschel L. Young	567	53.0
Libertarian	Randall (Randy) Langkraehr	503	47.0
Total votes		1,070	100.0

=== General election ===
==== Predictions ====
Source	Ranking	As of
The Cook Political Report	Safe R	November 3, 2014
Rothenberg	Safe R	October 24, 2014
Sabato's Crystal Ball	Safe R	October 30, 2014
RCP	Safe R	November 2, 2014
Daily Kos Elections	Safe R	November 4, 2014

==== Results ====
Missouri's 4th congressional district, 2014
Party	Candidate	Votes	%
Republican	Vicky Hartzler (incumbent)	120,014	68.1
Democratic	Nate Irvin	46,464	26.3
Libertarian	Herschel L. Young	9,793	5.6
Independent	Gregory A Cowan (write-in)	15	0.0
Total votes		176,286	100.0
Republican hold			

== District 5 ==
2014 Missouri's 5th congressional district election
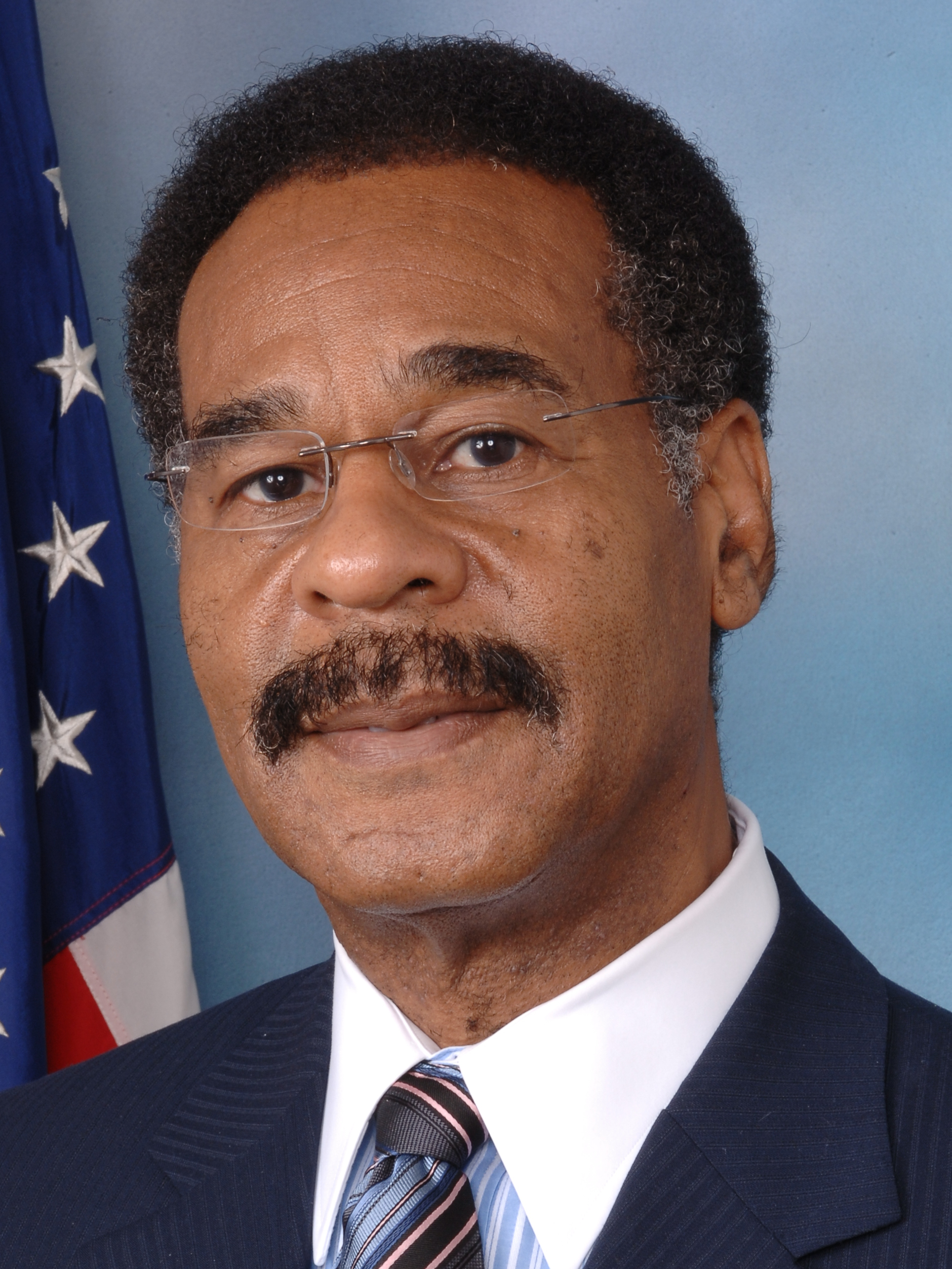

Nominee	Emanuel Cleaver	Jacob Turk
Party	Democratic	Republican
Popular vote	79,256	69,071
Percentage	51.6%	45.0%
- Cleaver: 50–60% Turk: 50–60% 60–70%
U.S. Representative before election
Emanuel Cleaver
Democratic
Elected U.S. Representative
Emanuel Cleaver
Democratic

Incumbent Democrat Emanuel Cleaver, who had represented the district since 2005, ran for re-election.

=== Democratic primary ===
==== Candidates ====
===== Nominee =====
- Emanuel Cleaver, incumbent U.S. Representative

===== Eliminated in primary =====
- Bob Gough, high school mathematics teacher and Republican candidate for the 6th District in 2012
- Eric Holmes, US Army colonel
- Charles Lindsey
- Mark S. Memoly, author, businessman and Republican candidate for Senate in 2012

==== Results ====
Democratic primary results
Party	Candidate	Votes	%
Democratic	Emanuel Cleaver II (incumbent)	44,926	82.0
Democratic	Mark S. Memoly	2,988	5.5
Democratic	Charles Lindsey	2,687	5.0
Democratic	Eric Holmes	2,584	4.8
Democratic	Bob Gough	1,438	2.7
Total votes		53,993	100.0

=== Republican primary ===
==== Candidates ====
===== Nominee =====
- Jacob Turk, Marine Corps veteran and nominee for this seat in 2006 and 2008, 2010 & 2012

===== Eliminated in primary =====
- Michael Burris, businessman
- Berton A. Knox, US Merchant Marine chief engineer
- Bill Lindsey, teacher and debate coach

===== Withdrawn =====
- Samuel Alao

==== Results ====
Republican primary results
Party	Candidate	Votes	%
Republican	Jacob Turk	24,615	68.6
Republican	Bill Lindsey	5,020	14.0
Republican	Michael Burris	4,797	13.4
Republican	Berton Knox	1,453	4.0
Total votes		35,885	100.0

=== Libertarian primary ===
==== Candidates ====
===== Nominee =====
- Roy Welborn, IT worker

==== Results ====
Libertarian primary results
Party	Candidate	Votes	%
Libertarian	Roy Welborn	813	100.0

=== General election ===
==== Predictions ====
Source	Ranking	As of
The Cook Political Report	Safe D	November 3, 2014
Rothenberg	Safe D	October 24, 2014
Sabato's Crystal Ball	Safe D	October 30, 2014
RCP	Safe D	November 2, 2014
Daily Kos Elections	Safe D	November 4, 2014

==== Results ====
Missouri's 5th congressional district, 2014
Party	Candidate	Votes	%
Democratic	Emanuel Cleaver (incumbent)	79,256	51.6
Republican	Jacob Turk	69,071	45.0
Libertarian	Roy Welborn	5,308	3.4
Total votes		153,635	100.0
Democratic hold			

== District 6 ==
2014 Missouri's 6th congressional district election
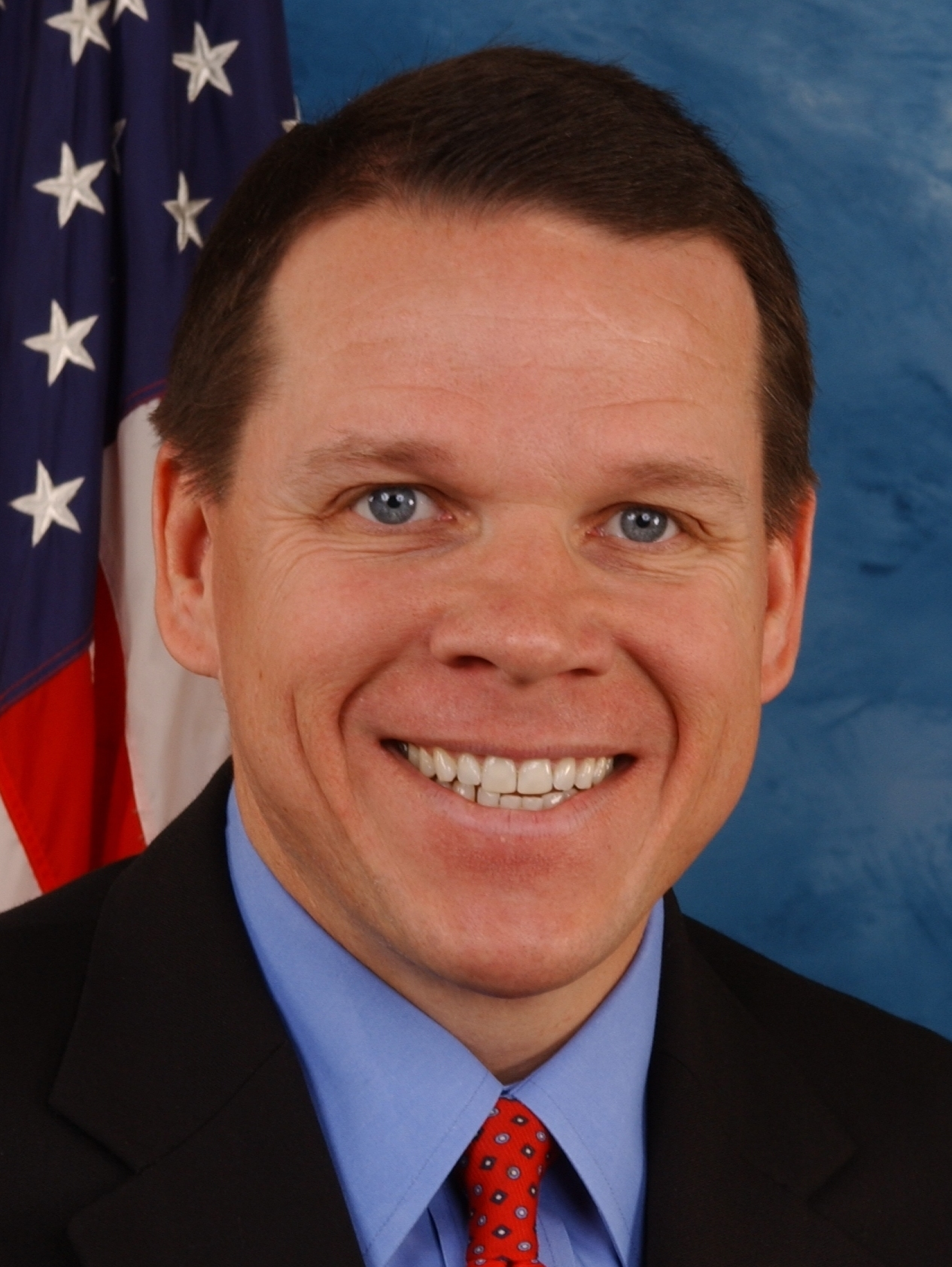

Nominee	Sam Graves	Bill Hedge
Party	Republican	Democratic
Popular vote	124,616	55,157
Percentage	66.6%	29.5%
- Graves: 50–60% 60–70% 70–80% 80–90%
U.S. Representative before election
Sam Graves
Republican
Elected U.S. Representative
Sam Graves
Republican

Incumbent Republican Sam Graves, who had represented the district since 2001, ran for re-election.

=== Republican primary ===
==== Candidates ====
===== Nominee =====
- Sam Graves, incumbent U.S. Representative

===== Eliminated in primary =====
- Kyle Reid, farmer
- Christopher Ryan, stay-at-home father and former U.S. Marine
- Brian Tharp, entrepreneur

==== Results ====
Republican primary results
Party	Candidate	Votes	%
Republican	Sam Graves (incumbent)	56,789	76.6
Republican	Christopher Ryan	8,745	11.8
Republican	Kyle Reid	4,364	5.9
Republican	Brian L. Tharp	4,244	5.7
Total votes		74,142	100.0

=== Democratic primary ===
==== Candidates ====
===== Nominee =====
- Bill Hedge, pastor of St. Francis Baptist Temple

===== Eliminated in primary =====
- Gary Crose
- Edward Fields

==== Results ====
Democratic primary results
Party	Candidate	Votes	%
Democratic	W. A. (Bill) Hedge	18,109	51.7
Democratic	Edward Dwayne Fields	9,706	27.7
Democratic	Gary Lynn Crose	7,241	20.6
Total votes		35,056	100.0

=== Libertarian primary ===
==== Candidates ====
===== Nominee =====
- Russ Monchil

==== Results ====
Libertarian primary results
Party	Candidate	Votes	%
Libertarian	Russ Monchil	591	100.0

=== General election ===
==== Predictions ====
Source	Ranking	As of
The Cook Political Report	Safe R	November 3, 2014
Rothenberg	Safe R	October 24, 2014
Sabato's Crystal Ball	Safe R	October 30, 2014
RCP	Safe R	November 2, 2014
Daily Kos Elections	Safe R	November 4, 2014

==== Results ====
Missouri's 6th congressional district, 2014
Party	Candidate	Votes	%
Republican	Sam Graves (incumbent)	124,616	66.6
Democratic	W. A. (Bill) Hedge	55,157	29.5
Libertarian	Russ Monchil	7,197	3.9
Total votes		186,970	100.0
Republican hold			

== District 7 ==
2014 Missouri's 7th congressional district election
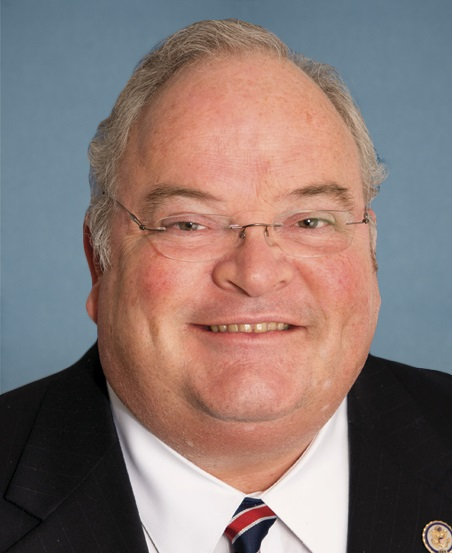

Nominee	Billy Long	Jim Evans	Kevin Craig
Party	Republican	Democratic	Libertarian
Popular vote	104,054	47,282	12,584
Percentage	63.5%	28.8%	7.7%
- County results Long: 50–60% 60–70% 70–80%
U.S. Representative before election
Billy Long
Republican
Elected U.S. Representative
Billy Long
Republican

Incumbent Republican Billy Long, who had represented the district since 2011, ran for re-election.

=== Republican primary ===
==== Candidates ====
===== Nominee =====
- Billy Long, incumbent U.S. Representative

===== Eliminated in primary =====
- Marshall Works, insurance executive and Democratic candidate for the 2nd District in 2012

==== Results ====
Republican primary results
Party	Candidate	Votes	%
Republican	Billy Long (incumbent)	55,505	62.4
Republican	Marshall Works	33,498	37.6
Total votes		89,003	100.0

=== Democratic primary ===
==== Candidates ====
===== Nominee =====
- Jim Evans, retired businessman, teacher, U.S. Army veteran and nominee for this seat in 2012

===== Eliminated in primary =====
- Genevieve Williams

==== Results ====
Democratic primary results
Party	Candidate	Votes	%
Democratic	Jim Evans	8,671	53.8
Democratic	Genevieve Williams	7,457	46.2
Total votes		16,128	100.0

=== Libertarian primary ===
==== Candidates ====
===== Nominee =====
- Kevin Craig

==== Results ====
Libertarian primary results
Party	Candidate	Votes	%
Libertarian	Kevin Craig	764	100.0

=== General election ===
==== Predictions ====
Source	Ranking	As of
The Cook Political Report	Safe R	November 3, 2014
Rothenberg	Safe R	October 24, 2014
Sabato's Crystal Ball	Safe R	October 30, 2014
RCP	Safe R	November 2, 2014
Daily Kos Elections	Safe R	November 4, 2014

==== Results ====
Missouri's 7th congressional district, 2014
Party	Candidate	Votes	%
Republican	Billy Long (incumbent)	104,054	63.5
Democratic	Jim Evans	47,282	28.8
Libertarian	Kevin Craig	12,584	7.7
n/a	Write-ins	37	0.0
Total votes		163,957	100.0
Republican hold			

== District 8 ==
2014 Missouri's 8th congressional district election
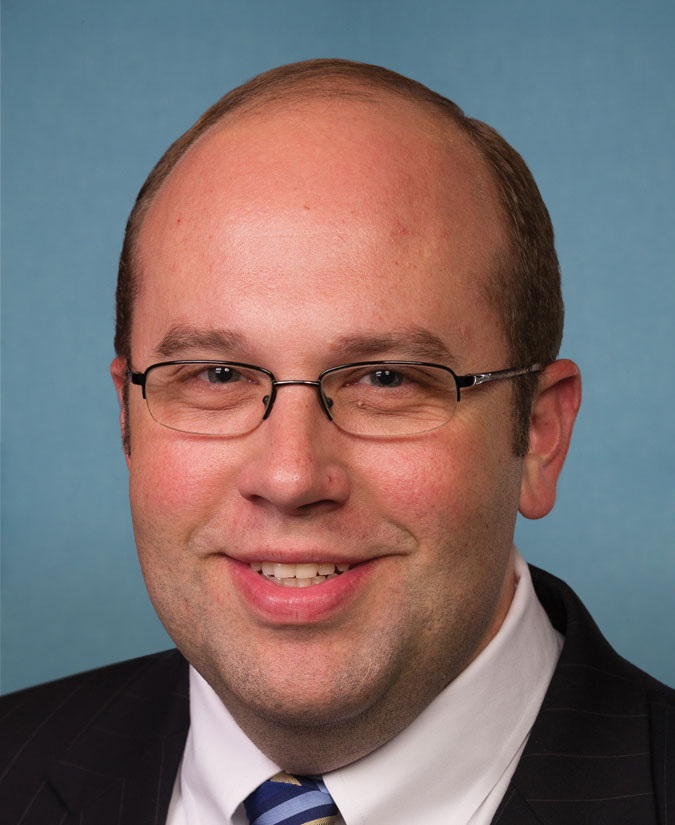

Nominee	Jason Smith	Barbara Stocker
Party	Republican	Democratic
Popular vote	106,124	38,721
Percentage	66.6%	24.3%
- Smith: 50–60% 60–70% 70–80% 80–90%
U.S. Representative before election
Jason Smith
Republican
Elected U.S. Representative
Jason Smith
Republican

Incumbent Republican Jason Smith, who had represented the district since 2013, ran for re-election.

=== Republican primary ===
==== Candidates ====
===== Nominee =====
- Jason Smith, incumbent U.S. Representative

===== Declined =====
- Peter Kinder, incumbent Lieutenant Governor

==== Results ====
Republican primary results
Party	Candidate	Votes	%
Republican	Jason Smith (incumbent)	66,511	100.0

=== Democratic primary ===
==== Candidates ====
===== Nominee =====
- Barbara Stocker, medical researcher

==== Results ====
Democratic primary results
Party	Candidate	Votes	%
Democratic	Barbara Stocker	28,303	100.0

=== Libertarian primary ===
==== Nominee ====
- Rick Vandeven

==== Results ====
Libertarian primary results
Party	Candidate	Votes	%
Libertarian	Rick Vandeven	462	100.0

=== Constitution primary ===
==== Nominee ====
- Doug Enyart, forester

==== Results ====
Constitution primary results
Party	Candidate	Votes	%
Constitution	Doug Enyart	368	100.0

=== General election ===
==== Predictions ====
Source	Ranking	As of
The Cook Political Report	Safe R	November 3, 2014
Rothenberg	Safe R	October 24, 2014
Sabato's Crystal Ball	Safe R	October 30, 2014
RCP	Safe R	November 2, 2014
Daily Kos Elections	Safe R	November 4, 2014

==== Results ====
Missouri's 8th congressional district, 2014
Party	Candidate	Votes	%
Republican	Jason Smith (incumbent)	106,124	66.6
Democratic	Barbara Stocker	38,721	24.3
Independent	Terry Hampton	6,821	4.3
Constitution	Doug Enyart	3,799	2.4
Libertarian	Rick Vandeven	3,759	2.4
Total votes		159,224	100.0
Republican hold			
