= Crossroads College Preparatory School =

High school in St. Louis, Missouri, US

Location
- 500 DeBaliviere Ave; St. Louis, Missouri 63112; United States; 38°39′07″N 90°17′03″W

Information
- Former name: Crossroads School (1974–2012)
- Type: Private
- Established: 1974; 52 years ago
- Founder: Arthur Lieber
- Grades: 7–12
- Enrollment: 210 (2018)
- Campus: Urban
- Colors: Blue and yellow
- Nickname: Chargers
- Accreditation: Independent Schools Association of the Central States (ISACS)
- Tuition: Individualized Tuition
- Website: crossroadscollegeprep.org

Crossroads College Preparatory School is a college-preparatory school in St. Louis, Missouri, United States founded by St. Louis native Arthur Lieber in 1974. It is located near Forest Park on the western edge of St. Louis. There is a MetroLink mass transit station within walking distance.

As of 2023, there are 33 students enrolled in the seventh and eighth grades and 85 in the high school. In 2023, the school offers individualized tuition based on each family’s ability to pay.

Crossroads College Prep School is a member of the following independent school associations:

- Independent Schools of St. Louis (ISSL)
- National Association of Independent Schools (NAIS)
- Independent Schools Association of the Central States (ISACS)

== History ==
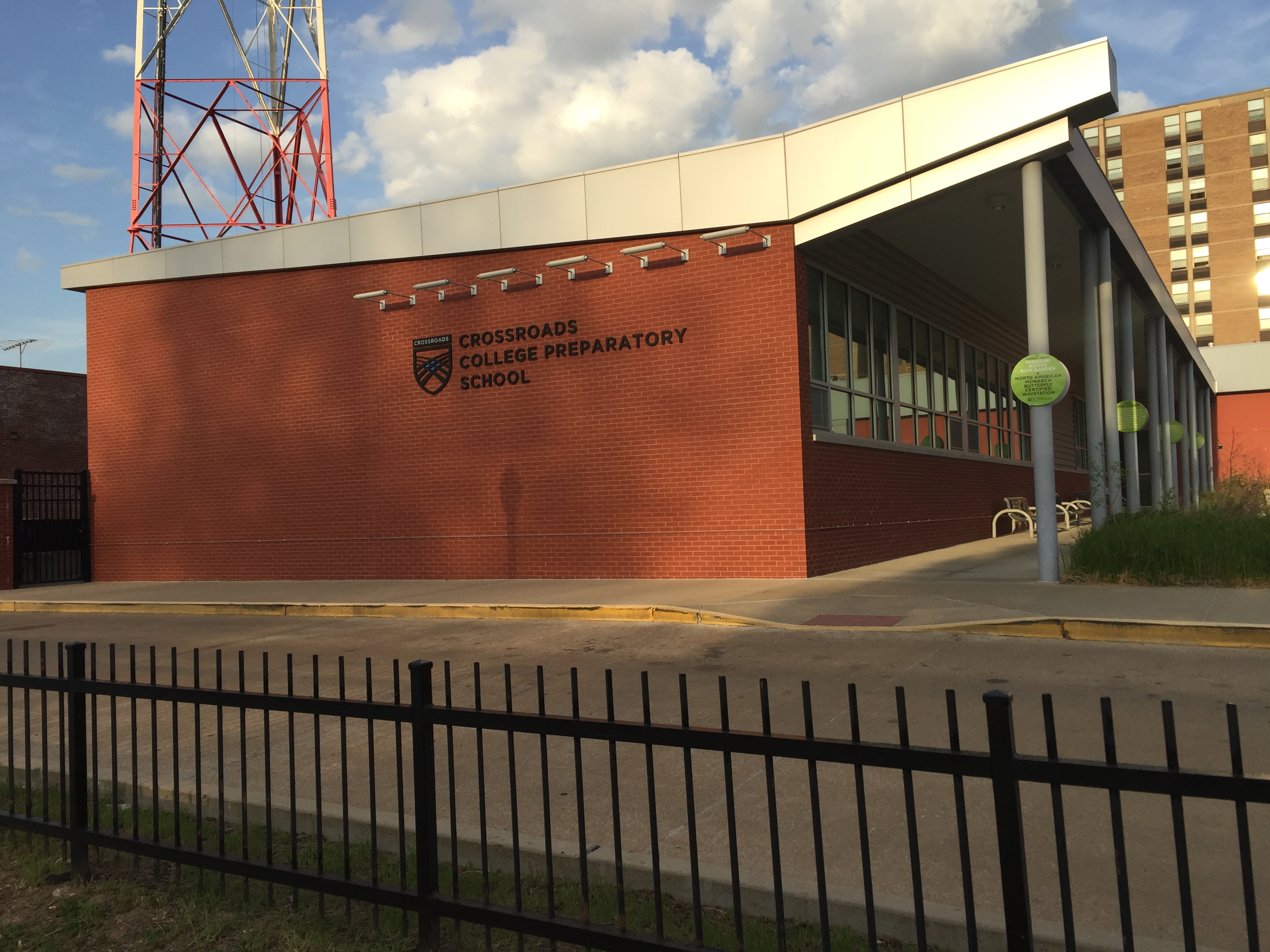
Crossroads in 2017

Crossroads was founded by Arthur Lieber in 1974 as a middle school. It began as an experiential school with an emphasis on personal relationships between students and teachers. In 1981, the school expanded to include a high school and moved to the Skinker DeBaliviere neighborhood of St. Louis.

The 1990s saw a change in the school's focus as the board of directors hired Billy Handmaker as head of school and tasked him with overhauling the curriculum and increasing academic requirements to focus on college preparation. The school changed its name from Crossroads School to Crossroads College Preparatory School in 2006.

In 2012, Crossroads was one of 78 schools in the country, and one of two in Missouri, to be named a "Green Ribbon School" by the Department of Education for their "comprehensive approach to creating 'green' environments through reducing environmental impact, promoting health, and ensuring a high-quality environmental and outdoor education to prepare students with the 21st century skills and sustainability concepts needed in the growing global economy".

== Notable people ==
- Annie Wersching (1995), actress
- David Jay (2000), asexual activist
