= Tommy Sowers =

American academic administrator and former U.S. Army officer

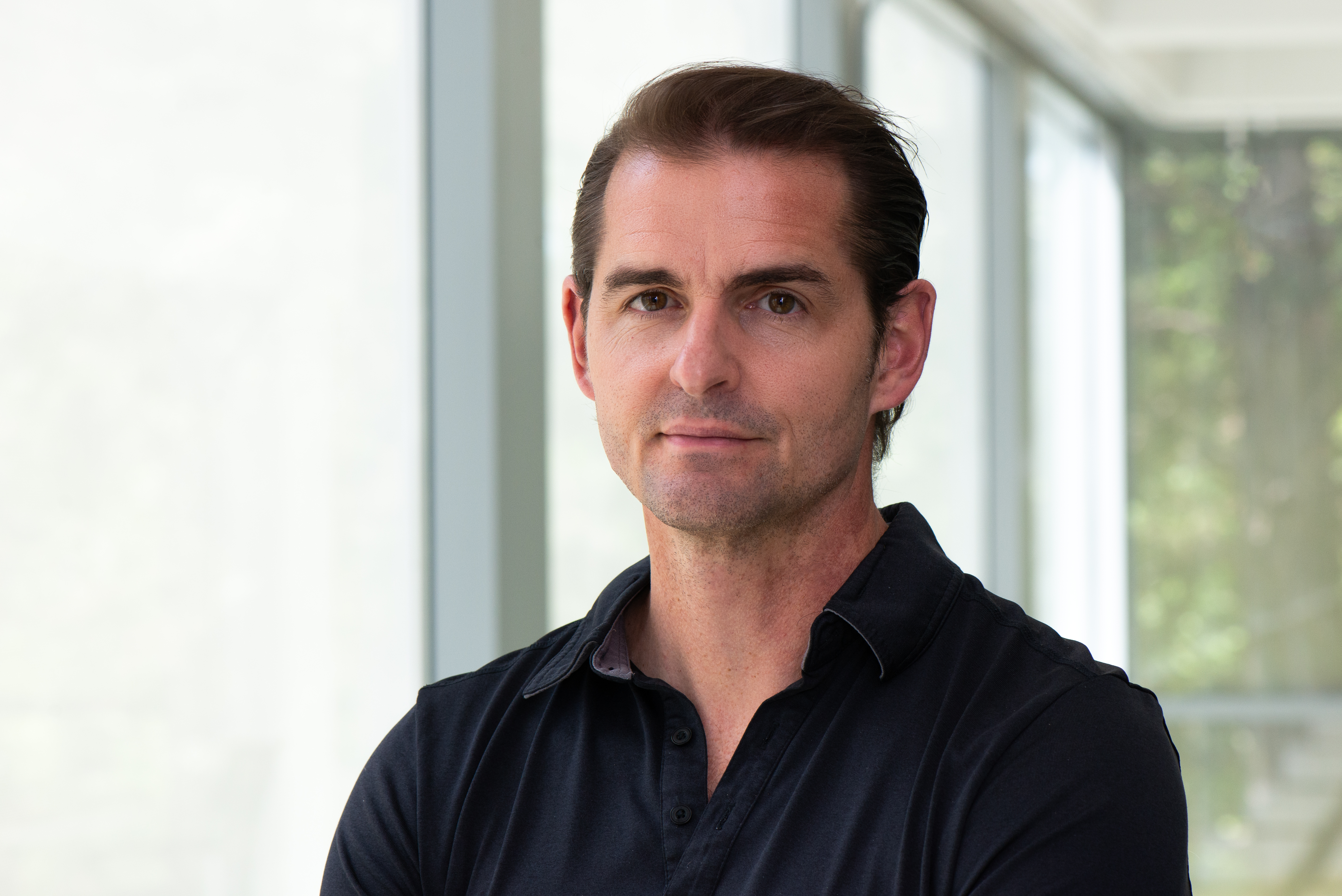

Vice Chancellor for Innovation, Entrepreneurship and Economic Development, University of North Carolina at Chapel Hill
- Incumbent
- Assumed office April 20, 2026

Assistant Secretary of Veterans Affairs for Public and Intergovernmental Affairs
- In office August 20, 2012 – April 2014
- President: Barack Obama

Personal details
- Born: February 23, 1976 (age 50) Rolla, Missouri, U.S.
- Party: Democratic
- Education: Duke University (AB); London School of Economics (PhD)
- Profession: University administrator, entrepreneur

Military service
- Allegiance: United States
- Branch/service: United States Army
- Years of service: 1998–2009
- Rank: Major
- Unit: 10th Special Forces Group
- Battles/wars: Kosovo War; Iraq War

Tommy Sowers (born February 23, 1976) is an American academic administrator, entrepreneur, and former United States Army officer. A veteran of the Kosovo and Iraq wars, he was the Democratic nominee for Missouri's 8th congressional district in 2010 and served as assistant secretary for public and intergovernmental affairs at the United States Department of Veterans Affairs from 2012 to 2014. He co-founded the real estate startup GoldenKey and later taught at Duke University. Since April 2026 he has been vice chancellor for innovation, entrepreneurship and economic development and chief innovation officer at the University of North Carolina at Chapel Hill.

== Early life and education ==
Sowers grew up in Rolla, Missouri, where his family ran the local newspaper. He attended Duke University on an ROTC scholarship, graduating in 1998 with a degree in public policy. He later studied at the London School of Economics, completing a PhD in 2011 with a dissertation on how monitoring technology affects the relationship between superiors and subordinates in the U.S. and British armies in Iraq.

== Military career ==
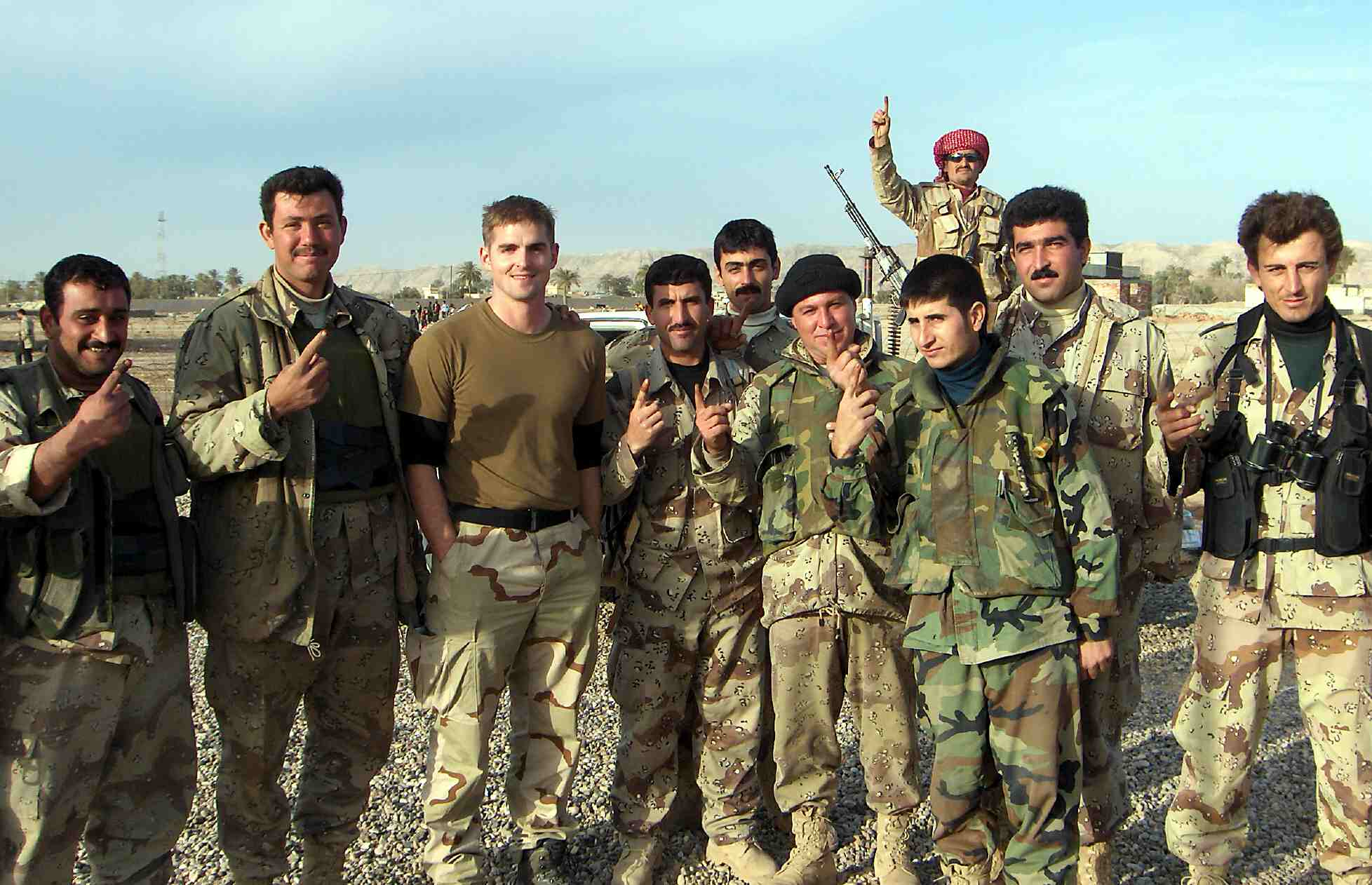
Sowers in Iraq

Sowers was commissioned in the U.S. Army Corps of Engineers in 1998 and led a combat engineer platoon with the 1st Infantry Division during the Kosovo War. He later qualified as a Special Forces officer and deployed twice to Iraq with the 10th Special Forces Group between 2004 and 2006. He received two Bronze Star Medals and left the Army in 2009 as a major.

From 2006 to 2009 he was an assistant professor in the Department of Social Sciences at the United States Military Academy at West Point, teaching American government.

== 2010 congressional campaign ==
In September 2009, Sowers announced his candidacy as a Democrat for Missouri's 8th congressional district against incumbent Republican Jo Ann Emerson. He campaigned by working a day's job in each of the district's 28 counties, and raised more than $1 million, outraising Emerson in some quarters. Politico described him as one of the party's most promising recruits of the cycle.

Sowers drew national attention for calling for an end to the conventional war in Afghanistan, arguing that the goal of training the Afghan army and police was unrealistic; The Washington Post profiled the campaign in October 2010 as a test of whether the war registered with voters. Emerson defeated Sowers with 65 percent of the vote.

== Department of Veterans Affairs ==
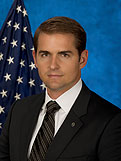
Sowers as assistant secretary

On May 9, 2012, President Barack Obama nominated Sowers to be assistant secretary for public and intergovernmental affairs at the United States Department of Veterans Affairs. He was confirmed by the Senate on August 2, 2012. In the role he served as a principal spokesman for the department during the backlog in disability claims, and served until April 2014. He co-created the Lincoln Awards, a televised awards program honoring service to veterans and military families.

== Business career ==
In 2015, Sowers co-founded GoldenKey, an online real estate marketplace based in Durham, North Carolina. The company was acquired by Landis in 2018. In 2018 he became Southeast regional director of MD5, the Department of Defense's national security technology accelerator, later the National Security Innovation Network. From 2021 he was president and chief operating officer of flyExclusive, a private jet operator based in Kinston, North Carolina.

== Academic career ==
Sowers joined the Sanford School of Public Policy at Duke University as visiting faculty in 2014. In 2024 he became faculty lead for the Duke Initiative for Science & Society's applied technology ethics program.

In March 2026, the University of North Carolina at Chapel Hill named Sowers its vice chancellor for innovation, entrepreneurship and economic development and its first chief innovation officer, effective April 20, 2026.
