= 2006 United States House of Representatives elections in Missouri =

- November 7, 2006

All 9 Missouri seats to the United States House of Representatives
| | Majority party | Minority party |
|---|---|---|
| Party | Republican | Democratic |
| Last election | 5 | 4 |
| Seats won | 5 | 4 |
| Seat change | Steady | Steady |
| Popular vote | 1,049,346 | 992,258 |
| Percentage | 50.03% | 47.31% |
| Swing | ▼3.58% | ▲2.59% |

Republican
50–60%
60–70%
70–80%
80–90%
Democratic
50–60%
60–70%
70–80%
80–90%

== Overview ==
United States House of Representatives elections in Missouri, 2006
| Party | Votes | Percentage | Seats | +/– |
|---|---|---|---|---|
| Republican | 1,049,346 | 50.03% | 5 | - |
| Democratic | 992,258 | 47.31% | 4 | - |
| Libertarian | 47,213 | 2.25% | 0 | - |
| Progressive | 8,452 | 0.40% | 0 | - |
| Independents | 53 | <0.01% | 0 | - |
| Totals | 2,097,322 | 100.00% | 9 | - |

== District 1 ==
2006 Missouri's 1st congressional district election
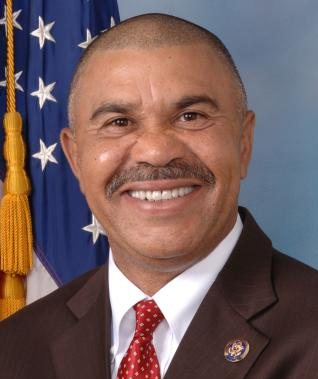

| Nominee | William Lacy Clay, Jr. | Mark J. Byrne |
| Party | Democratic | Republican |
| Popular vote | 141,574 | 47,893 |
| Percentage | 72.9% | 24.7% |
- County results Clay: 60–70% 90–100%
U.S. Representative before election
William Lacy Clay, Jr. (inc.)
Democratic
Elected U.S. Representative
William Lacy Clay, Jr.
Democratic

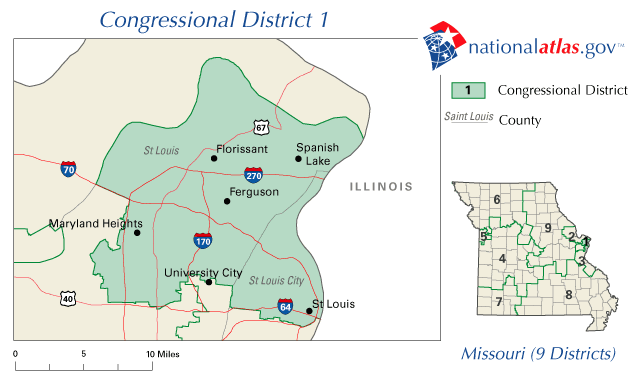

Incumbent Democratic Congressman William Lacy Clay Jr. faced no difficulty in seeking another term in this liberal, St. Louis–based district over Republican Mark Byrne and Libertarian Robb Cunningham.

=== Predictions ===
| Source | Ranking | As of |
|---|---|---|
| The Cook Political Report | Safe D | November 6, 2006 |
| Rothenberg | Safe D | November 6, 2006 |
| Sabato's Crystal Ball | Safe D | November 6, 2006 |
| Real Clear Politics | Safe D | November 7, 2006 |
| CQ Politics | Safe D | November 7, 2006 |

Missouri's 1st congressional district election, 2006)
| Party | Candidate | Votes | % |
|---|---|---|---|
| Democratic | William Lacy Clay, Jr. (inc.) | 141,574 | 72.89 |
| Republican | Mark J. Byrne | 47,893 | 24.66 |
| Libertarian | Robb E. Cunningham | 4,768 | 2.45 |
| Total votes | | 194,235 | 100.00 |
| Democratic hold | | | |

== District 2 ==
2006 Missouri's 2nd congressional district election
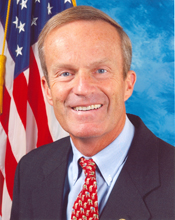

| Nominee | Todd Akin | George D. Weber |
| Party | Republican | Democratic |
| Popular vote | 176,452 | 105,242 |
| Percentage | 61.4% | 36.6% |
- County results Akin: 50–60% 60–70%
U.S. Representative before election
Todd Akin (inc.)
Republican
Elected U.S. Representative
Todd Akin
Republican

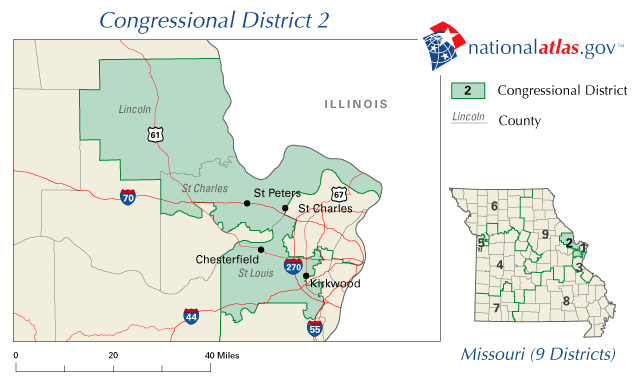

Though confronted with a powerful Democratic wave, incumbent Republican Congressman Todd Akin easily won a third term over Democrat George Weber and Libertarian Tamara Millay.

=== Predictions ===
| Source | Ranking | As of |
|---|---|---|
| The Cook Political Report | Safe R | November 6, 2006 |
| Rothenberg | Safe R | November 6, 2006 |
| Sabato's Crystal Ball | Safe R | November 6, 2006 |
| Real Clear Politics | Safe R | November 7, 2006 |
| CQ Politics | Safe R | November 7, 2006 |

Missouri's 2nd congressional district election, 2006
| Party | Candidate | Votes | % |
|---|---|---|---|
| Republican | Todd Akin (inc.) | 176,452 | 61.35 |
| Democratic | George D. Weber | 105,242 | 36.59 |
| Libertarian | Tamara Millay | 5,923 | 2.06 |
| Total votes | | 287,617 | 100.00 |
| Republican hold | | | |

== District 3 ==
2006 Missouri's 3rd congressional district election
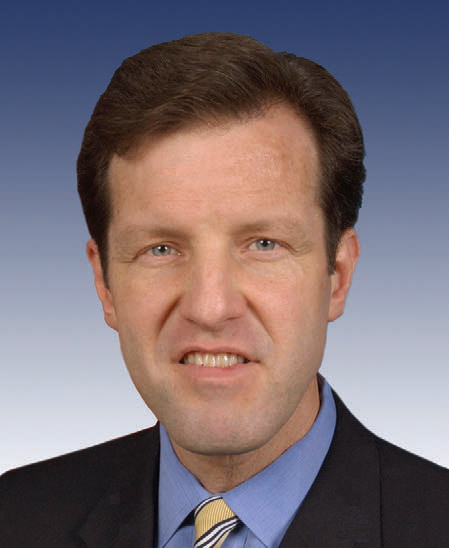

| Nominee | Russ Carnahan | David Bertelsen |
| Party | Democratic | Republican |
| Popular vote | 145,219 | 70,189 |
| Percentage | 65.6% | 31.7% |
- County results Carnahan: 60–70% 70–80%
U.S. Representative before election
Russ Carnahan (inc.)
Democratic
Elected U.S. Representative
Russ Carnahan
Democratic

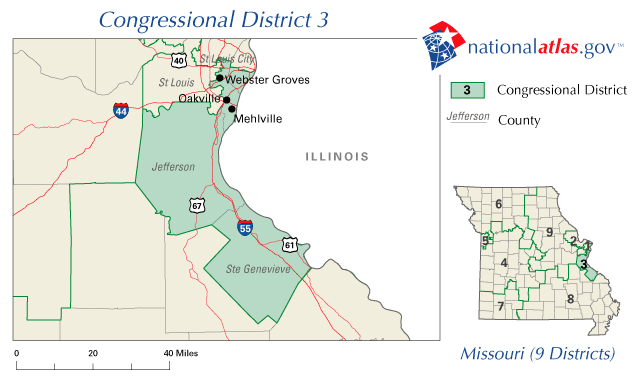

Freshman incumbent Congressman Russ Carnahan, a Democrat, had an easy time in winning a second term in this fairly liberal district based in the southern portion of St. Louis.

=== Predictions ===
| Source | Ranking | As of |
|---|---|---|
| The Cook Political Report | Safe D | November 6, 2006 |
| Rothenberg | Safe D | November 6, 2006 |
| Sabato's Crystal Ball | Safe D | November 6, 2006 |
| Real Clear Politics | Safe D | November 7, 2006 |
| CQ Politics | Safe D | November 7, 2006 |

Missouri's 3rd congressional district election, 2006
| Party | Candidate | Votes | % |
|---|---|---|---|
| Democratic | Russ Carnahan (inc.) | 145,219 | 65.58 |
| Republican | David Bertelsen | 70,189 | 31.70 |
| Libertarian | R. Christophel | 4,213 | 1.90 |
| Progressive | David Sladky | 1,827 | 0.83 |
| Total votes | | 221,448 | 100.00 |
| Democratic hold | | | |

== District 4 ==
2006 Missouri's 4th congressional district election
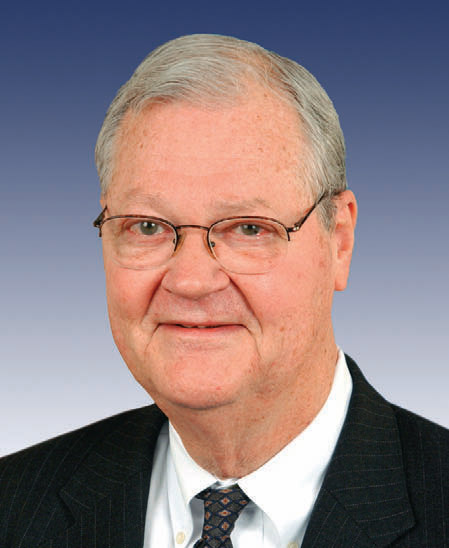

| Nominee | Ike Skelton | Jim Noland |
| Party | Democratic | Republican |
| Popular vote | 159,303 | 69,254 |
| Percentage | 67.6% | 29.4% |
- County results Skelton: 50–60% 60–70% 70–80% 80–90% Noland: 50–60%
U.S. Representative before election
Ike Skelton
Democratic
Elected U.S. Representative
Ike Skelton
Democratic

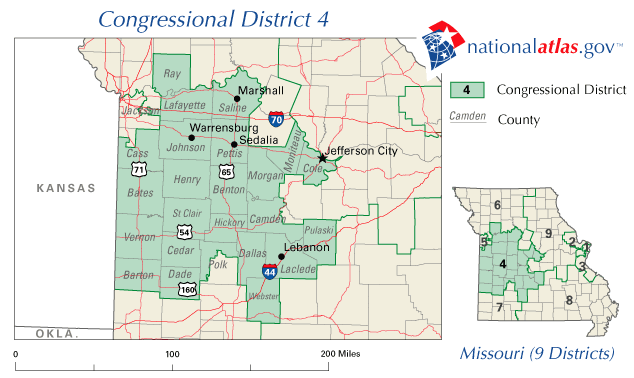

Incumbent Democratic Congressman Ike Skelton, seeking his sixteenth term in this conservative, west-central Missouri–based district, defeated Republican candidate Jim Noland, Libertarian nominee Bryce Holthouse, and Progressive Party candidate Mel Ivey.

=== Predictions ===
| Source | Ranking | As of |
|---|---|---|
| The Cook Political Report | Safe D | November 6, 2006 |
| Rothenberg | Safe D | November 6, 2006 |
| Sabato's Crystal Ball | Safe D | November 6, 2006 |
| Real Clear Politics | Safe D | November 7, 2006 |
| CQ Politics | Safe D | November 7, 2006 |

Missouri's 4th congressional district election, 2006)
| Party | Candidate | Votes | % |
|---|---|---|---|
| Democratic | Ike Skelton (inc.) | 159,303 | 67.64 |
| Republican | Jim Noland | 69,254 | 29.40 |
| Libertarian | Bryce A. Holthouse | 4,479 | 1.90 |
| Progressive | Mel Ivey | 2,459 | 1.04 |
| Write-ins | | 30 | 0.01 |
| Total votes | | 235,525 | 100.00 |
| Democratic hold | | | |

== District 5 ==
2006 Missouri's 5th congressional district election
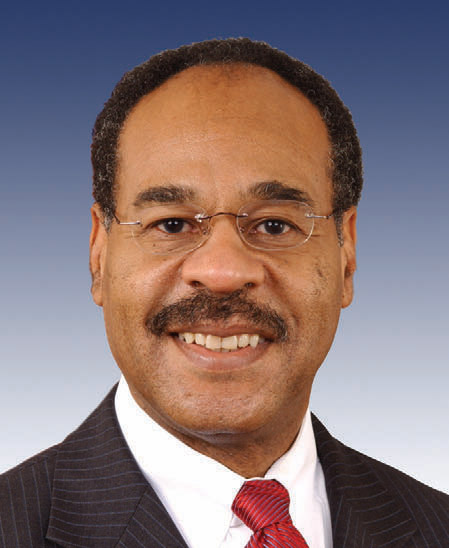

| Nominee | Emanuel Cleaver | Jacob Turk |
| Party | Democratic | Republican |
| Popular vote | 136,149 | 68,456 |
| Percentage | 64.3% | 32.3% |
- County results Cleaver: 50–60% 70–80% Turk: 40–50%
U.S. Representative before election
Emanuel Cleaver (inc.)
Democratic
Elected U.S. Representative
Emanuel Cleaver
Democratic

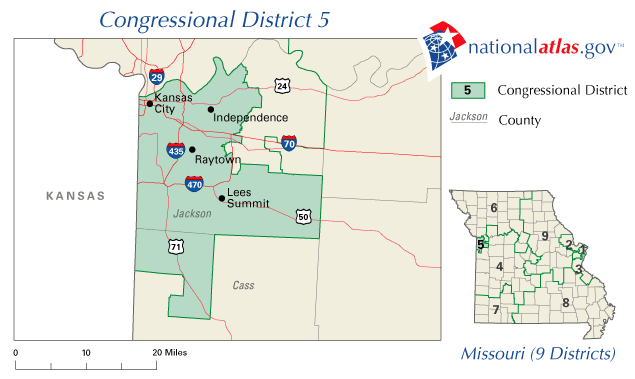

Following from a close election in 2004, freshman incumbent Congressman Emanuel Cleaver, a Democrat, defeated Republican nominee Jacob Turk to win a third term.

=== Predictions ===
| Source | Ranking | As of |
|---|---|---|
| The Cook Political Report | Safe D | November 6, 2006 |
| Rothenberg | Safe D | November 6, 2006 |
| Sabato's Crystal Ball | Safe D | November 6, 2006 |
| Real Clear Politics | Safe D | November 7, 2006 |
| CQ Politics | Safe D | November 7, 2006 |

Missouri's 5th congressional district election, 2006)
| Party | Candidate | Votes | % |
|---|---|---|---|
| Democratic | Emanuel Cleaver (inc.) | 136,149 | 64.25 |
| Republican | Jacob Turk | 68,456 | 32.30 |
| Libertarian | Randy Langkraehr | 7,314 | 3.45 |
| Total votes | | 211,919 | 100.00 |
| Democratic hold | | | |

== District 6 ==
2006 Missouri's 6th congressional district election
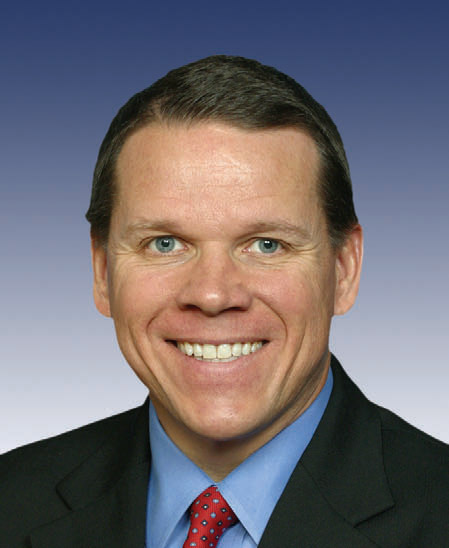

| Nominee | Sam Graves | Sara Jo Shettles |
| Party | Republican | Democratic |
| Popular vote | 150,882 | 87,477 |
| Percentage | 61.6% | 35.7% |
- County results Graves: 50–60% 60–70% 70–80%
U.S. Representative before election
Sam Graves (inc.)
Republican
Elected U.S. Representative
Sam Graves
Republican

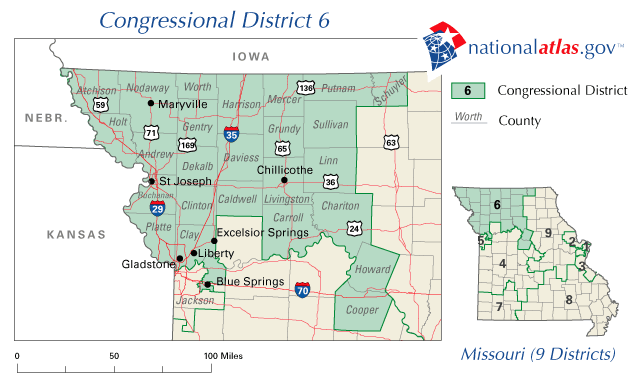

In this conservative, northwest Missouri district, incumbent Republican Congressman Sam Graves easily dispatched with Democratic nominee Sara Jo Shettles, Libertarian candidate Erik Buck, and Progressive candidate Shirley Yurkonis to win a fourth term in Congress.

=== Predictions ===
| Source | Ranking | As of |
|---|---|---|
| The Cook Political Report | Safe R | November 6, 2006 |
| Rothenberg | Safe R | November 6, 2006 |
| Sabato's Crystal Ball | Safe R | November 6, 2006 |
| Real Clear Politics | Safe R | November 7, 2006 |
| CQ Politics | Safe R | November 7, 2006 |

Missouri's 6th congressional district election, 2006
| Party | Candidate | Votes | % |
|---|---|---|---|
| Republican | Sam Graves (inc.) | 150,882 | 61.64 |
| Democratic | Sara Jo Shettles | 87,477 | 35.73 |
| Libertarian | Erik Buck | 4,757 | 1.94 |
| Progressive | Shirley A. Yurkonis | 1,679 | 0.69 |
| Total votes | | 244,795 | 100.00 |
| Republican hold | | | |

== District 7 ==
2006 Missouri's 7th congressional district election
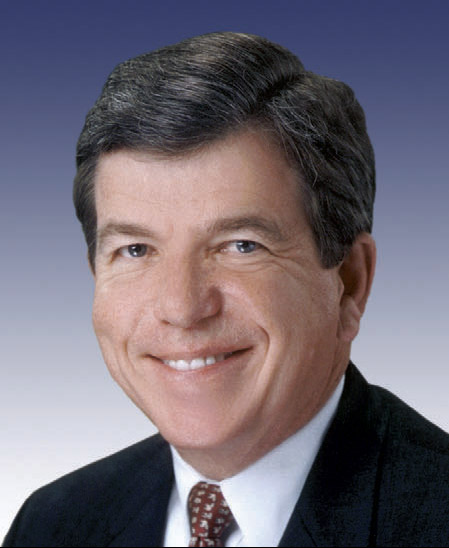

| Nominee | Roy Blunt | Jack Truman |
| Party | Republican | Democratic |
| Popular vote | 160,942 | 72,592 |
| Percentage | 66.8% | 30.1% |
- County results Blunt: 60–70% 70–80%
U.S. Representative before election
Roy Blunt (inc.)
Republican
Elected U.S. Representative
Roy Blunt
Republican

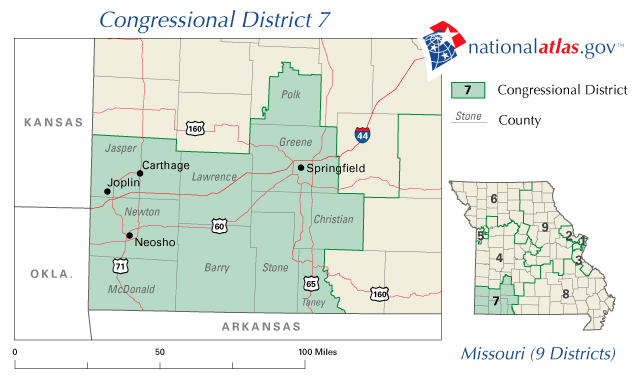

Incumbent Republican Congressman Roy Blunt, the House Majority Whip, found no difficulty in winning a sixth term in his very conservative district located in southwest Missouri.

=== Predictions ===
| Source | Ranking | As of |
|---|---|---|
| The Cook Political Report | Safe R | November 6, 2006 |
| Rothenberg | Safe R | November 6, 2006 |
| Sabato's Crystal Ball | Safe R | November 6, 2006 |
| Real Clear Politics | Safe R | November 7, 2006 |
| CQ Politics | Safe R | November 7, 2006 |

Missouri's 7th congressional district election, 2006
| Party | Candidate | Votes | % |
|---|---|---|---|
| Republican | Roy Blunt (inc.) | 160,942 | 66.75 |
| Democratic | Jack Truman | 72,592 | 30.11 |
| Libertarian | Kevin Craig | 7.566 | 3.14 |
| Independent (write-in) | Frazier Glenn Miller, Jr. | 23 | 0.01 |
| Total votes | | 241,123 | 100.00 |
| Republican hold | | | |

== District 8 ==
2006 Missouri's 8th congressional district election
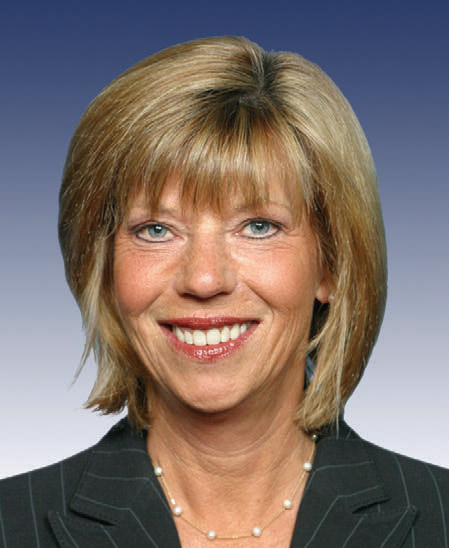

| Nominee | Jo Ann Emerson | Veronica J. Hambacker |
| Party | Republican | Democratic |
| Popular vote | 156,164 | 57,557 |
| Percentage | 71.6% | 26.4% |
U.S. Representative before election
Jo Ann Emerson (inc.)
Republican
Elected U.S. Representative
Jo Ann Emerson
Republican

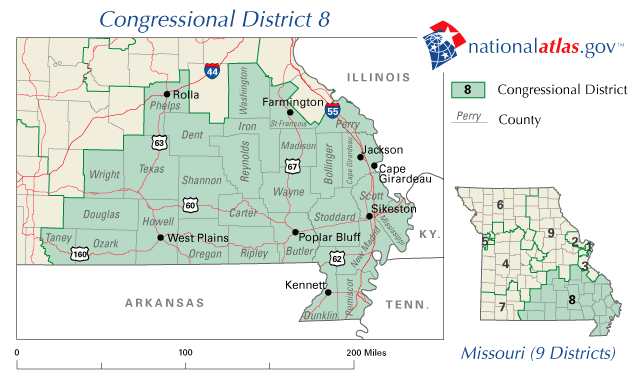

In the most conservative district found in Missouri, incumbent Republican Congresswoman Jo Ann Emerson coasted to re-election, swamping Democratic nominee Veronica Hambacker and Libertarian nominee Branden McCullough.

=== Predictions ===
| Source | Ranking | As of |
|---|---|---|
| The Cook Political Report | Safe R | November 6, 2006 |
| Rothenberg | Safe R | November 6, 2006 |
| Sabato's Crystal Ball | Safe R | November 6, 2006 |
| Real Clear Politics | Safe R | November 7, 2006 |
| CQ Politics | Safe R | November 7, 2006 |

Missouri's 8th congressional district election, 2006
| Party | Candidate | Votes | % |
|---|---|---|---|
| Republican | Jo Ann Emerson (inc.) | 156,164 | 71.64 |
| Democratic | Veronica J. Hambacker | 57,557 | 26.40 |
| Libertarian | Branden C. McCullough | 4,268 | 1.96 |
| Total votes | | 217,989 | 100.00 |
| Republican hold | | | |

== District 9 ==
2006 Missouri's 9th congressional district election
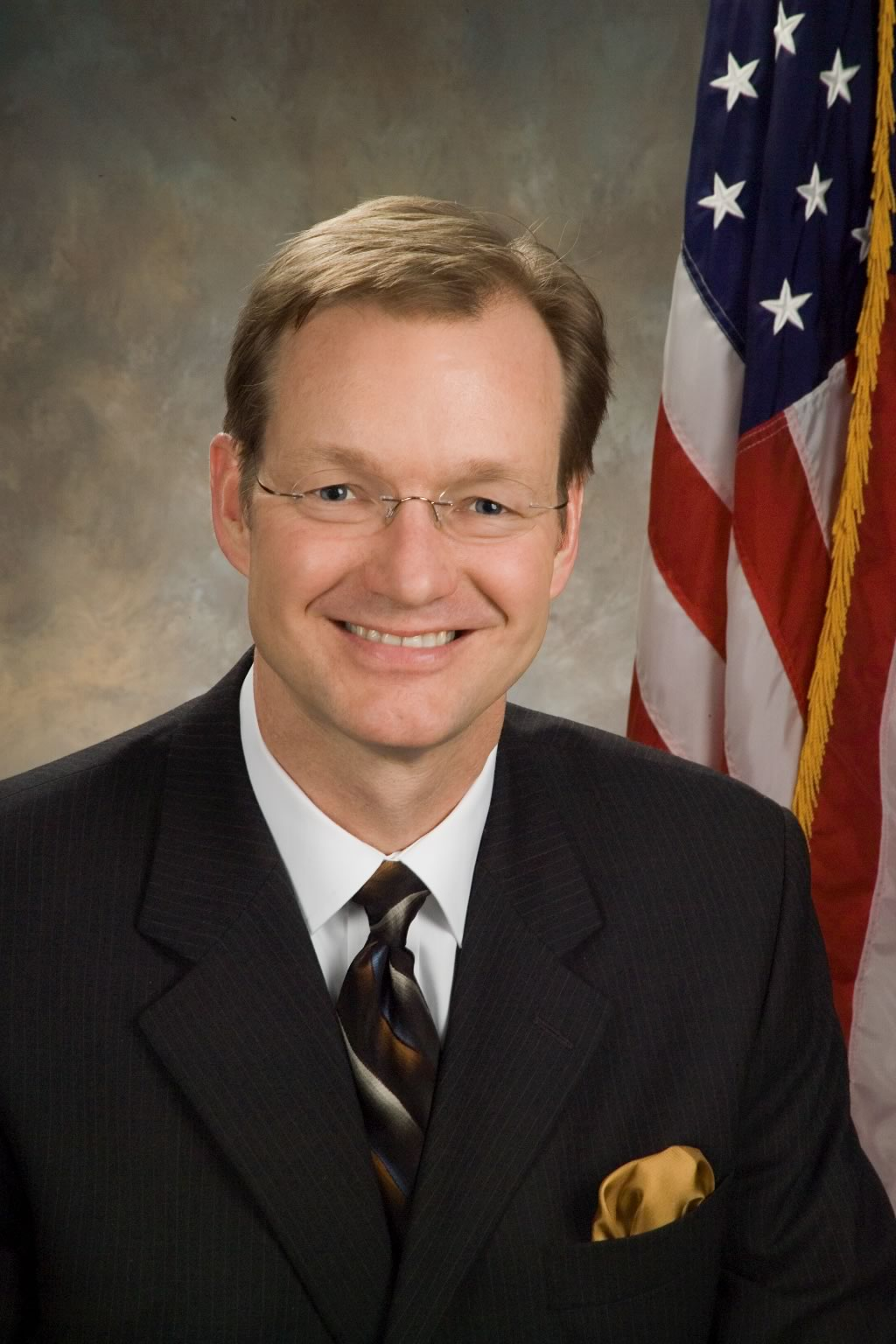

| Nominee | Kenny Hulshof | Duane N. Burghard |
| Party | Republican | Democratic |
| Popular vote | 149,114 | 87,145 |
| Percentage | 61.5% | 35.9% |
- County results Hulshof: 50–60% 60–70% 70–80%
U.S. Representative before election
Kenny Hulshof (inc.)
Republican
Elected U.S. Representative
Kenny Hulshof
Republican

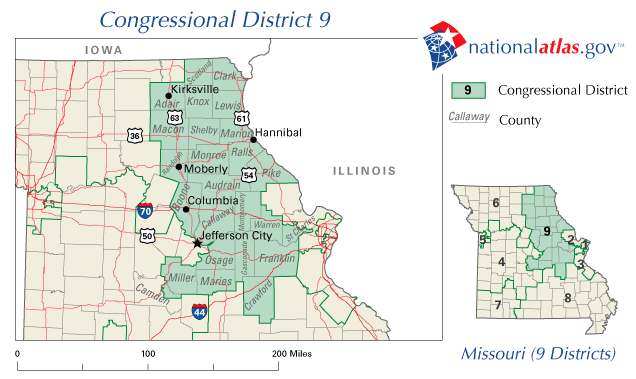

This district, based in "Little Dixie," located in northeast Missouri, has a strongly conservative bent and incumbent Republican Congressman Kenny Hulshof sought and won a sixth term against several opponents.

=== Predictions ===
| Source | Ranking | As of |
|---|---|---|
| The Cook Political Report | Safe R | November 6, 2006 |
| Rothenberg | Safe R | November 6, 2006 |
| Sabato's Crystal Ball | Safe R | November 6, 2006 |
| Real Clear Politics | Safe R | November 7, 2006 |
| CQ Politics | Safe R | November 7, 2006 |

Missouri's 9th congressional district election, 2006
| Party | Candidate | Votes | % |
|---|---|---|---|
| Republican | Kenny Hulshof (inc.) | 149,114 | 61.45 |
| Democratic | Duane N. Burghard | 87,145 | 35.91 |
| Libertarian | Steven R. Hedrick | 3,925 | 1.62 |
| Progressive | Bill Hastings | 2,487 | 1.02 |
| Total votes | | 242,671 | 100.00 |
| Republican hold | | | |

| Preceded by 2004 elections | United States House elections in Missouri; 2006 | Succeeded by 2008 elections |
