= 2000 United States House of Representatives elections in Missouri =

- November 7, 2000

All 9 Missouri seats to the United States House of Representatives
	Majority party	Minority party
Party	Republican	Democratic
Last election	4	5
Seats won	5	4
Seat change	▲1	▼1
Popular vote	1,135,724	1,136,020
Percentage	48.83%	48.85%

Republican
40–50%
50–60%
60–70%
70–80%
80–90%
Democratic
40–50%
50–60%
60–70%
70–80%

The 2000 House elections in Missouri occurred on November 7, 2000 to elect the members of the State of Missouri's delegation to the United States House of Representatives. Missouri had nine seats in the House, apportioned according to the 1990 United States census.

These elections were held concurrently with the United States Senate elections of 2000 (including an election in Missouri where Democrat Mel Carnahan was posthumously elected to the United States Senate), the United States House elections in other states, and various state and local elections.

Republicans narrowly flipped the sixth district, thereby giving Republicans a majority in the delegation. Missouri was one of five states where the party that won the popular vote did not win the most seats, along with Texas, New Mexico, Wisconsin, and Pennsylvania.

== Overview ==
United States House of Representatives elections in Missouri, 2000
Party	Votes	Percentage	Seats before	Seats after	+/–
Republican	1,135,724	48.83%	4	5	+1
Democratic	1,136,020	48.85%	5	4	-1
Libertarian	24,847	1.07%	0	0	0
Progressive	15,947	0.69%	0	0	0
Reform	8,293	0.36%	0	0	0
Natural Law	4,957	0.21%	0	0	0
Totals	2,325,788	100.00%	9	9	—
Voter turnout	%				

== Election results ==
District	Incumbent	Party	First elected	Results	Candidates
Missouri 1	William Lacy Clay, Sr.	Democratic	1968	Retired; Democratic hold	William Lacy Clay, Jr. (D) 75% Dwight Billingsly (R) 22% Brenda Reddick (G) 2%
Missouri 2	James Talent	Republican	1992	Retired to run for Governor; Republican hold	Todd Akin (R) 55% Ted House (D) 42% Mike Odell (G) 1%
Missouri 3	Dick Gephardt	Democratic	1976	Re-elected	Dick Gephardt (D) 58% Bill Federer (R) 40% Mary Maroney (G) 1%
Missouri 4	Ike Skelton	Democratic	1976	Re-elected	Ike Skelton (D) 67% Cecilia Noland (R) 31%
Missouri 5	Karen McCarthy	Democratic	1994	Re-elected	Karen McCarthy (D) 69% Steve Gordon (R) 29% Charles Reitz (G) 1%
Missouri 6	Patsy Danner	Democratic	1992	Retired; Republican gain	Sam Graves (R) 51% Steve Danner (D) 47%
Missouri 7	Roy Blunt	Republican	1996	Re-elected	Roy Blunt (R) 74% Charles Christrup (D) 24%
Missouri 8	Jo Ann Emerson	Republican	1996	Re-elected	Jo Ann Emerson (R) 69% Bob Camp (D) 29% Tom Sager (G) 1%
Missouri 9	Kenny Hulshof	Republican	1996	Re-elected	Kenny Hulshof (R) 59% Steven Carroll (D) 38% Devin Scherubel (G) 1%

== District 1 ==
2000 Missouri's 1st congressional district election
- November 7, 2000
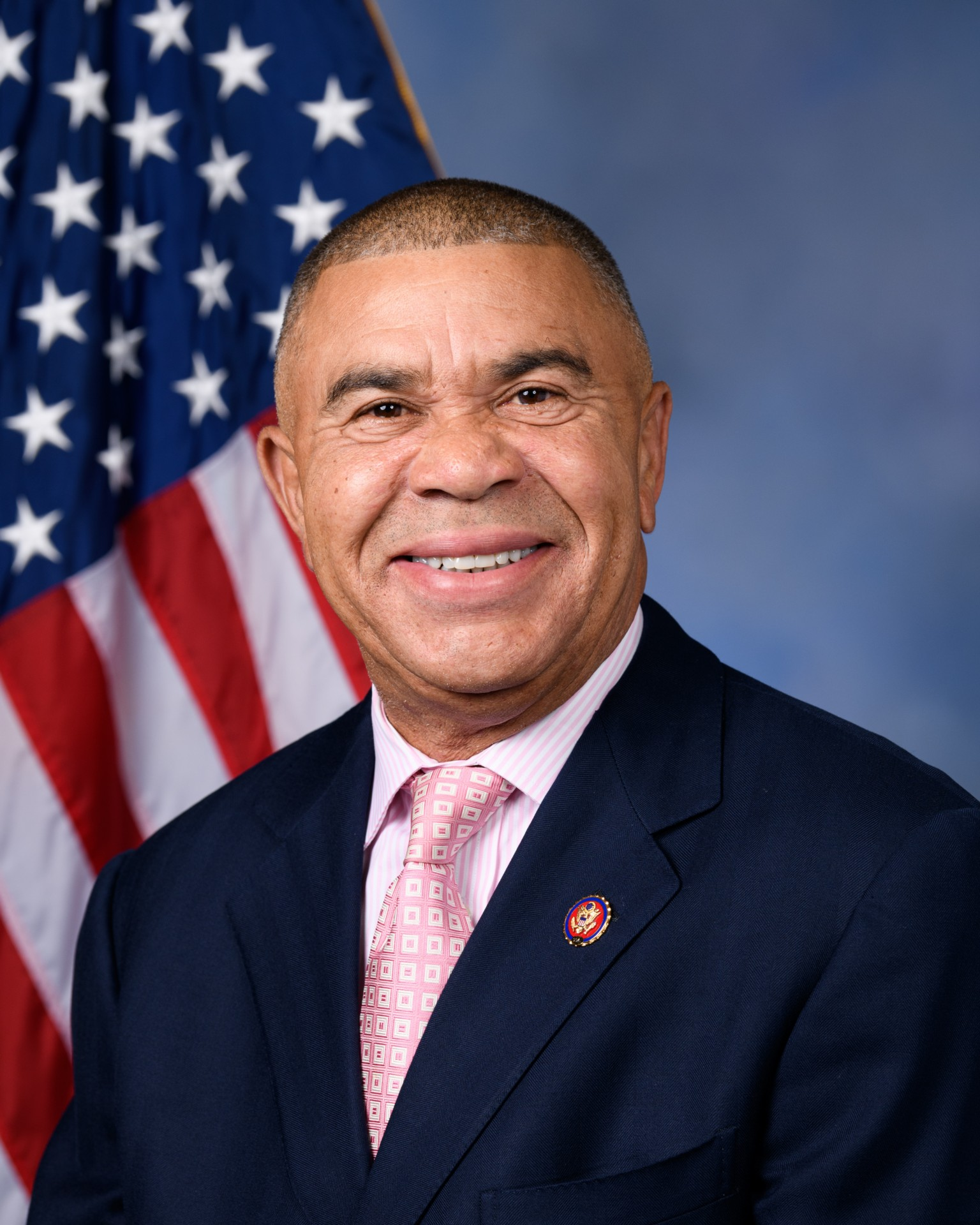

Nominee	William Lacy Clay, Jr.	Dwight Billingsly
Party	Democratic	Republican
Popular vote	149,173	42,730
Percentage	75.2%	21.5%
- County results Clay: 70–80% 90–100%
U.S. Representative before election
William Lacy Clay, Sr.
Democratic
Elected U.S. Representative
William Lacy Clay, Jr.
Democratic

Incumbent Democrat William Lacy Clay, Sr., who was first elected in 1968, retired. William Lacy Clay, Jr. won the open seat with 75.2% of the vote.

=== General election ===
==== Results ====
Missouri's 1st congressional district election, 2000
Party	Candidate	Votes	%
Democratic	William Lacy Clay, Jr.	149,173	75.2
Republican	Dwight Billingsly	42,730	21.5
Green	Brenda Reddick	3,099	1.6
Libertarian	Tamara A. Millay	2,253	1.1
Reform	Robert Penningroth	1,092	0.6
Total votes		198,347	100.0
Democratic hold			

== District 2 ==
2000 Missouri's 2nd congressional district election
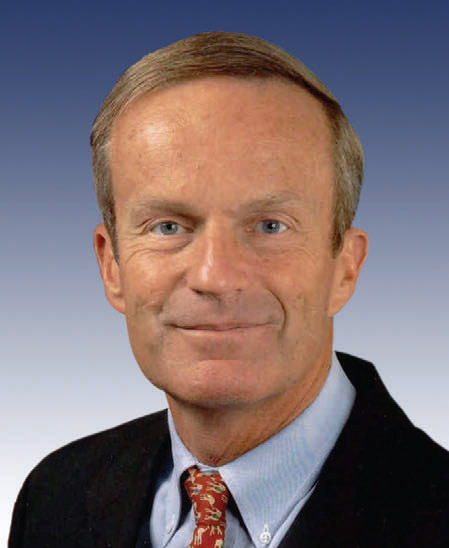

Nominee	Todd Akin	Ted House
Party	Republican	Democratic
Popular vote	164,926	126,441
Percentage	55.3%	42.4%
U.S. Representative before election
Jim Talent
Republican
Elected U.S. Representative
Todd Akin
Republican

=== General election ===
==== Polling ====
Poll source	Date(s)	Sample size	Margin of error	Todd Akin (R)	Ted House (D)	Other / undecided (Note: Calculated by taking the difference of 100% and all other candidates combined.)
Moore Information Group (R) (Note: Poll conducted for Todd Akin.)	October 18, 2000	350 (RV)	—	39%	37%	24%

Results

Missouri's 2nd congressional district election, 2000
Party	Candidate	Votes	%
Republican	Todd Akin	164,926	55.33%
Democratic	Ted House	126,441	42.42%
Green	Mike Odell	2,907	0.98%
Libertarian	James Higgins	2,524	0.85%
Reform	Richard J. Gimpelson	1,264	0.42%
Total votes		298,062	100.00%

== District 3 ==
2000 Missouri's 3rd congressional district election
- November 7, 2000
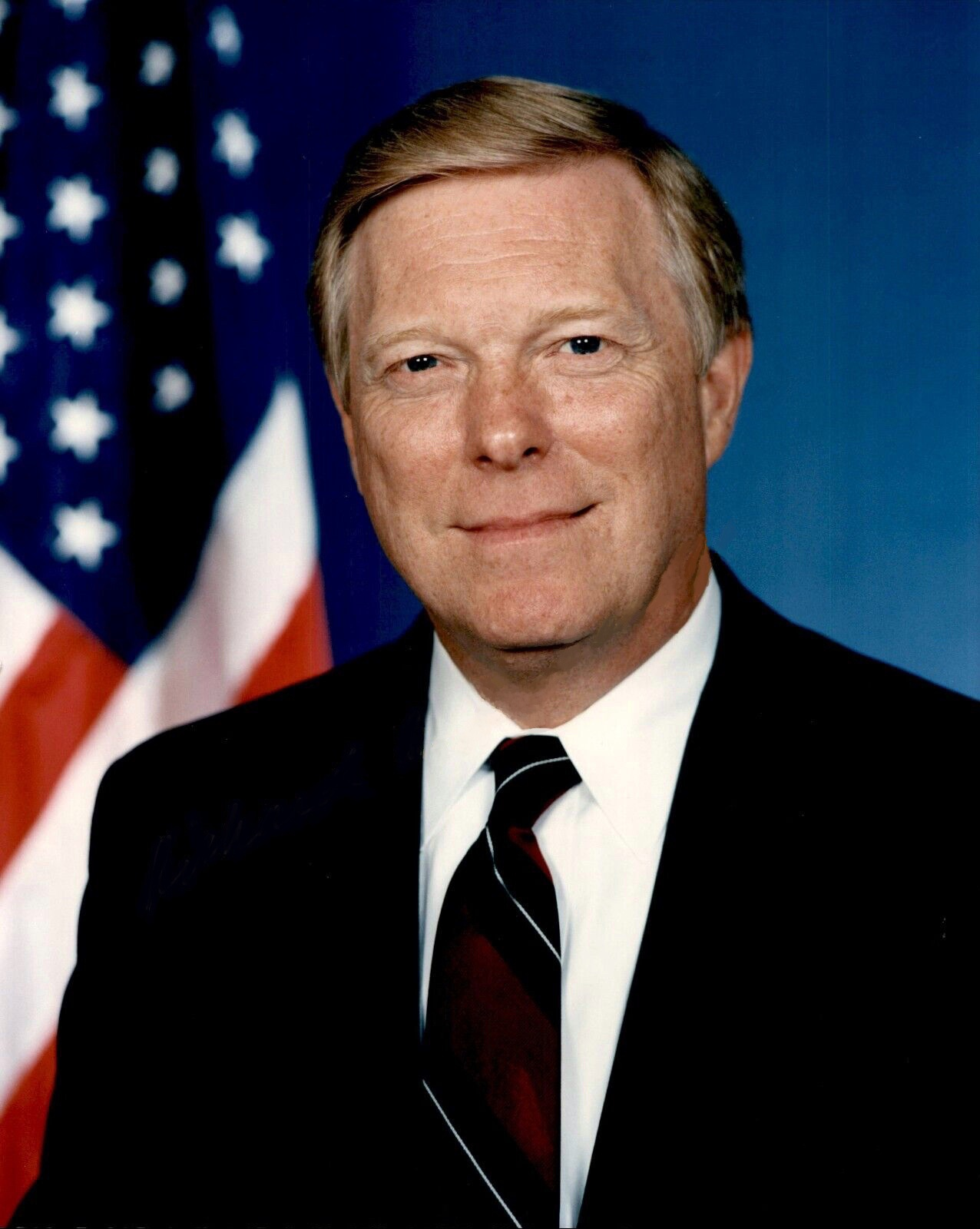

Nominee	Dick Gephardt	Bill Federer
Party	Democratic	Republican
Popular vote	147,222	100,967
Percentage	57.8%	39.7%
- County results Gephardt: 50–60% 60–70%
U.S. Representative before election
Dick Gephardt
Democratic
Elected U.S. Representative
Dick Gephardt
Democratic

Incumbent Democrat Dick Gephardt, who was first elected in 1976, ran for re-election. Gephardt was re-elected with 57.8% of the vote.

=== General election ===
==== Results ====
Missouri's 3rd congressional district election, 2000
Party	Candidate	Votes	%
Democratic	Dick Gephardt (incumbent)	147,222	57.8
Republican	Bill Federer	100,967	39.7
Green	Mary Maroney	3,266	1.3
Libertarian	Michael H. Crist	2,245	0.9
Reform	Anthony J. Windisch	839	0.3
Total votes		254,539	100.0
Democratic hold			

== District 4 ==
2000 Missouri's 4th congressional district election
- November 7, 2000
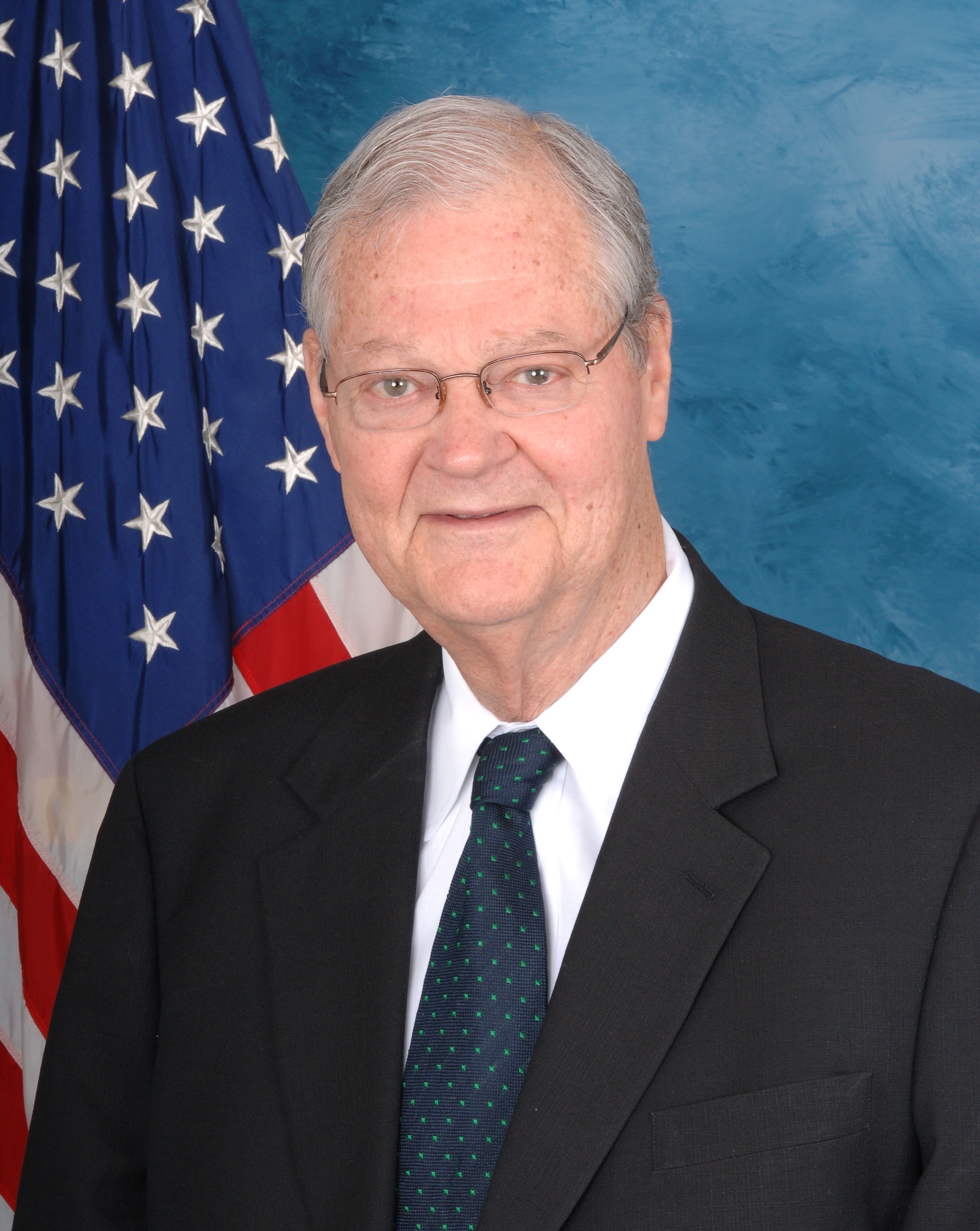

Nominee	Ike Skelton	Cecilia Noland
Party	Democratic	Republican
Popular vote	180,634	84,406
Percentage	66.9%	31.3%
- County results Skelton: 50–60% 60–70% 70–80%
U.S. Representative before election
Ike Skelton
Democratic
Elected U.S. Representative
Ike Skelton
Democratic

Incumbent Democrat Ike Skelton, who was first elected in 1976, ran for re-election. Skelton was re-elected with 66.9% of the vote.

=== General election ===
==== Results ====
Missouri's 4th congressional district election, 2000
Party	Candidate	Votes	%
Democratic	Ike Skelton (incumbent)	180,634	66.9
Republican	Cecilia Noland	84,406	31.3
Libertarian	Thomas L. Knapp	2,878	1.1
Reform	James Edward Rinehart	1,971	0.7
Total votes		269,889	100.0
Democratic hold			

== District 5 ==
2000 Missouri's 5th congressional district election
- November 7, 2000
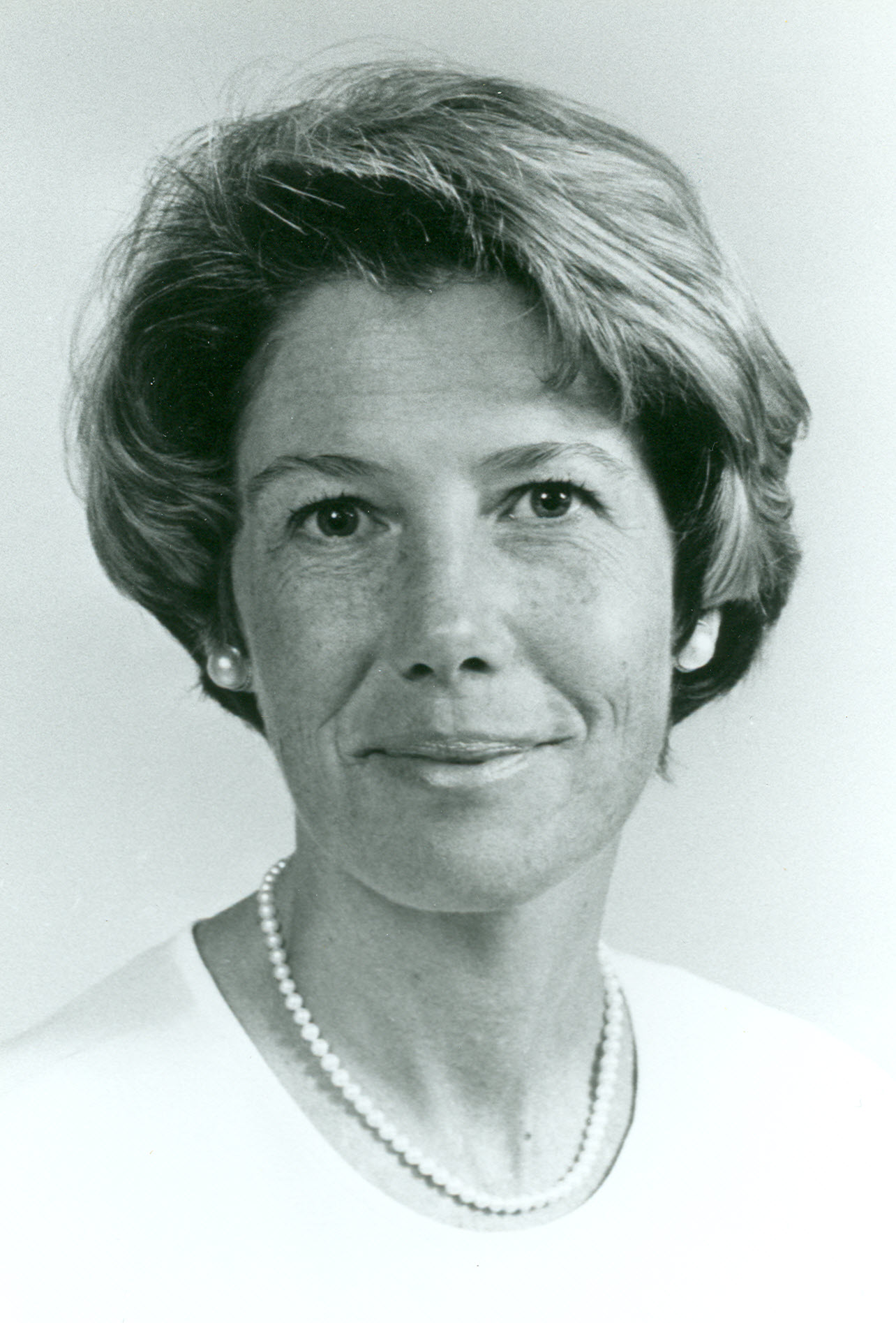

Nominee	Karen McCarthy	Steve Gordon
Party	Democratic	Republican
Popular vote	159,826	66,439
Percentage	68.8%	28.6%
- County results Mccarthy: 60–70%
U.S. Representative before election
Karen McCarthy
Democratic
Elected U.S. Representative
Karen McCarthy
Democratic

Incumbent Democrat Karen McCarthy, who was first elected in 1994, ran for re-election. McCarthy was re-elected with 68.8% of the vote.

=== General election ===
==== Results ====
Missouri's 5th congressional district election, 2000
Party	Candidate	Votes	%
Democratic	Karen McCarthy (incumbent)	159,826	68.8
Republican	Steve Gordon	66,439	28.6
Green	Charles Reitz	2,548	1.1
Libertarian	Alan Newberry	2,350	1.0
Reform	Dennis M. Carriger	974	0.4
Total votes		232,137	100.0
Democratic hold			

== District 6 ==
2000 Missouri's 6th congressional district election
- November 7, 2000
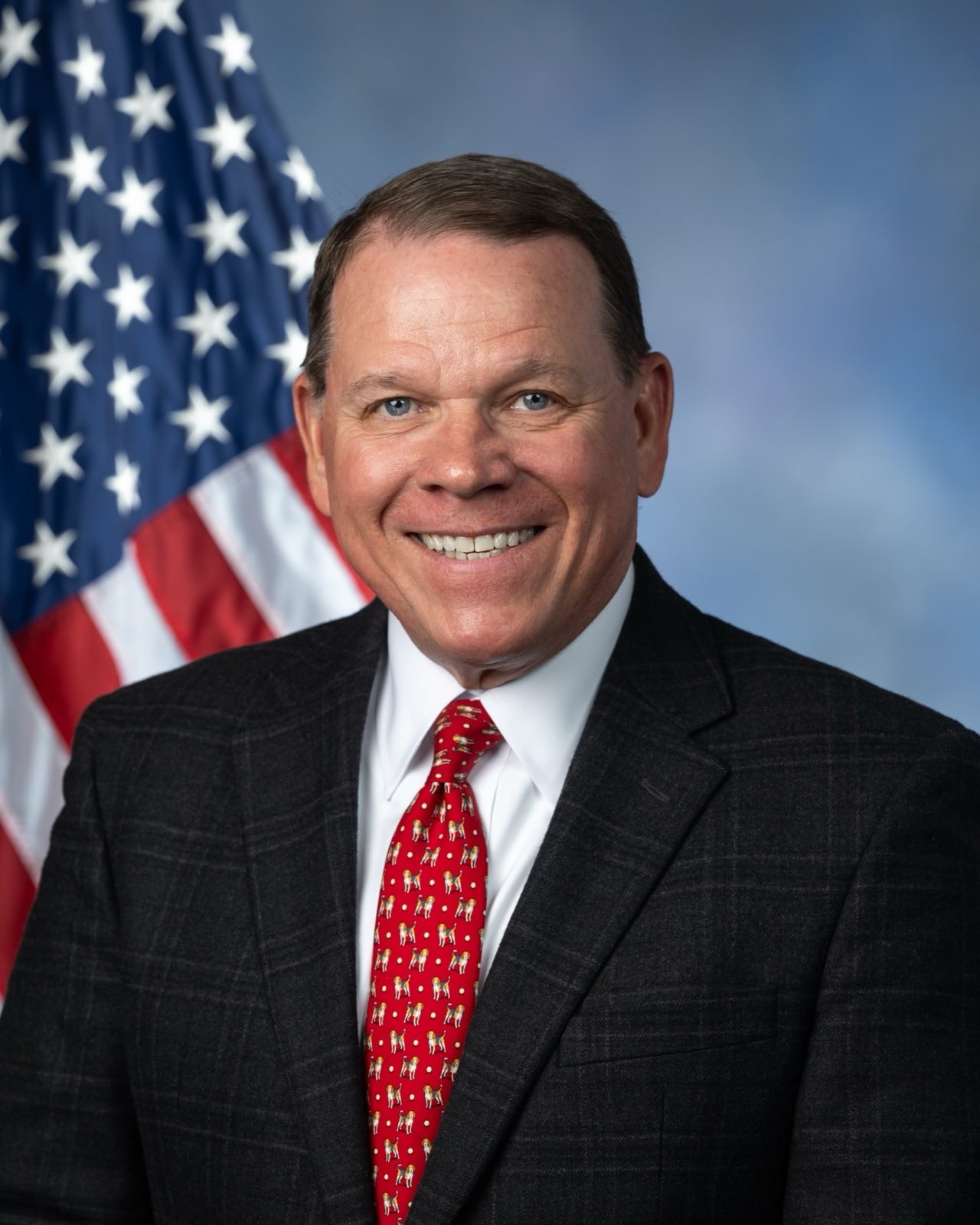

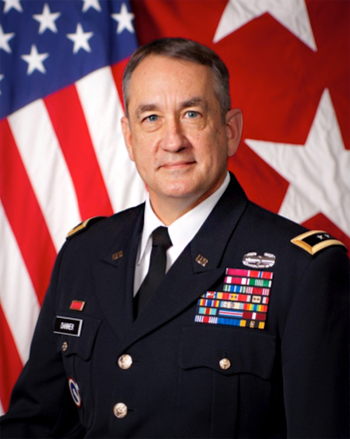
Nominee	Sam Graves	Steve Danner
Party	Republican	Democratic
Popular vote	138,925	127,792
Percentage	50.9%	46.8%
- County results Graves: 40–50% 50–60% 60–70% 70–80% Danner: 40–50% 50–60% 60–70%
U.S. Representative before election
Patsy Danner
Democratic
Elected U.S. Representative
Sam Graves
Republican

Incumbent Democrat Patsy Danner, who was first elected in 1992, retired. Sam Graves won the open seat with 50.9% of the vote.

=== General election ===
==== Results ====
Missouri's 6th congressional district election, 2000
Party	Candidate	Votes	%
Republican	Sam Graves	138,925	50.9
Democratic	Steve Danner	127,792	46.8
Libertarian	Jimmy Dykes	3,696	1.4
Natural Law	Marie Richey	2,788	1.0
Total votes		273,201	100.0
Republican gain from Democratic			

== District 7 ==
2000 Missouri's 7th congressional district election
- November 7, 2000
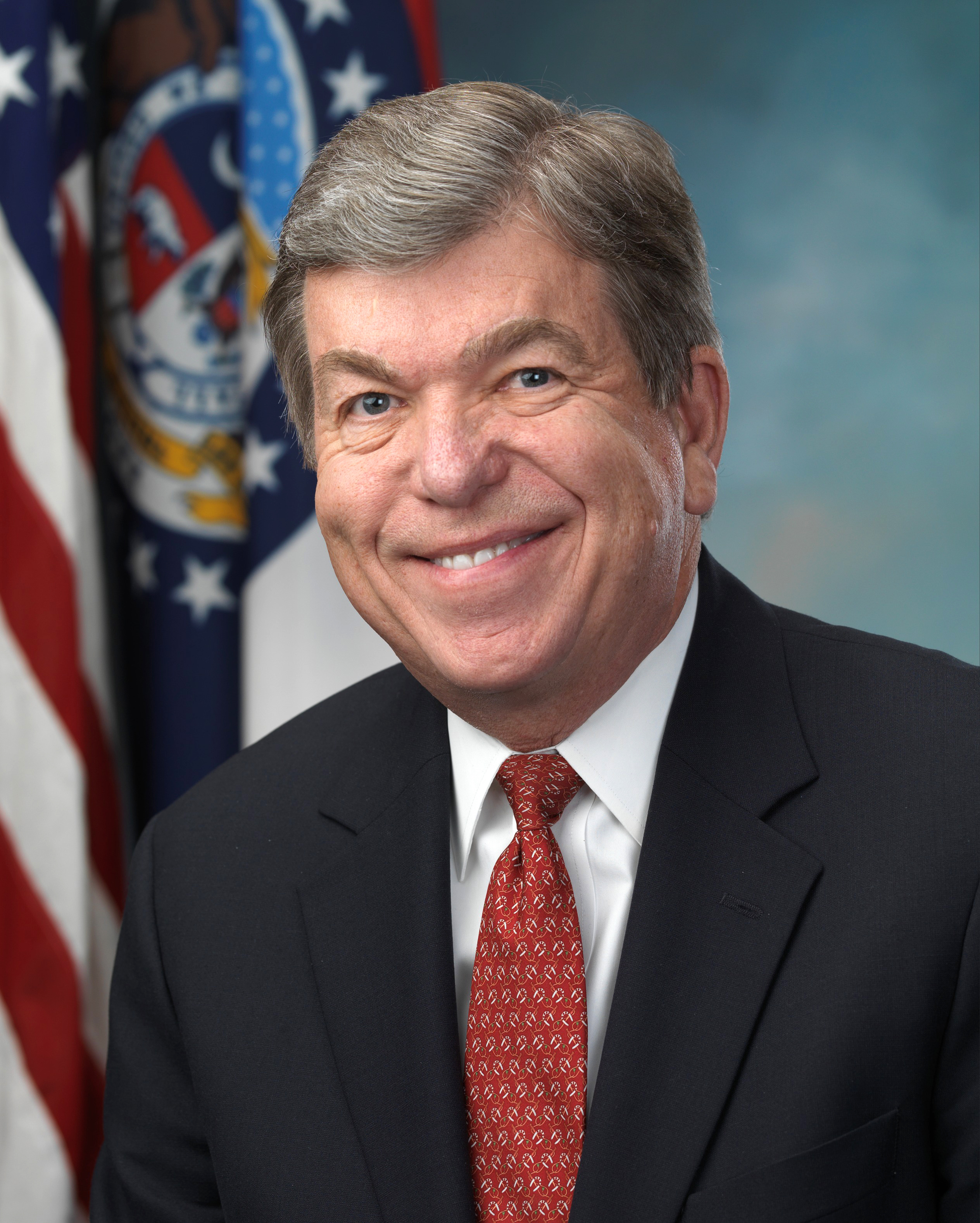

Nominee	Roy Blunt	Charles Christrup
Party	Republican	Democratic
Popular vote	202,305	65,510
Percentage	73.9%	23.9%
- County results Blunt: 70–80% 80–90%
U.S. Representative before election
Roy Blunt
Republican
Elected U.S. Representative
Roy Blunt
Republican

Incumbent Republican Roy Blunt, who was first elected in 1996, ran for re-election. Blunt was re-elected with 73.9% of the vote.

=== General election ===
==== Results ====
Missouri's 7th congressional district election, 2000
Party	Candidate	Votes	%
Republican	Roy Blunt (incumbent)	202,305	73.9
Democratic	Charles Christrup	65,510	23.9
Libertarian	Doug Burlison	2,965	1.1
Natural Law	Sharalyn Harris	2,169	0.8
Reform	Ron Lapham	988	0.4
Total votes		273,937	100.0
Republican hold			

== District 8 ==
2000 Missouri's 8th congressional district election
- November 7, 2000
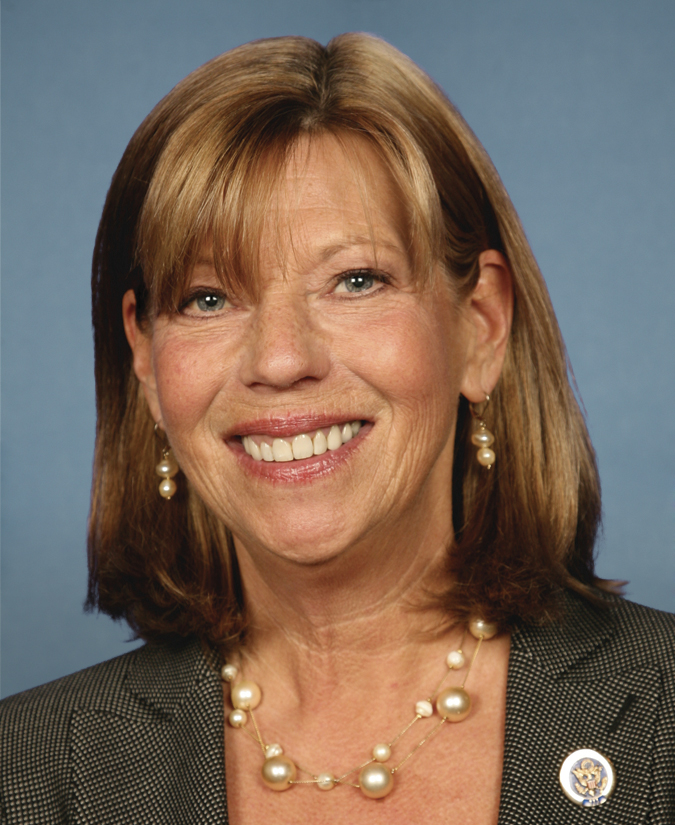

Nominee	Jo Ann Emerson	Bob Camp
Party	Republican	Democratic
Popular vote	162,239	67,760
Percentage	69.3%	28.9%
U.S. Representative before election
Jo Ann Emerson
Republican
Elected U.S. Representative
Jo Ann Emerson
Republican

Incumbent Republican Jo Ann Emerson, who was first elected in 1996, ran for re-election. Emerson was re-elected with 69.3% of the vote.

=== General election ===
==== Results ====
Missouri's 8th congressional district election, 2000
Party	Candidate	Votes	%
Republican	Jo Ann Emerson (incumbent)	162,239	69.3
Democratic	Bob Camp	67,760	28.9
Libertarian	John B. Hendricks	2,328	1.0
Green	Tom Sager	1,739	0.7
Total votes		234,066	100.0
Republican hold			

== District 9 ==
2000 Missouri's 9th congressional district election
- November 7, 2000
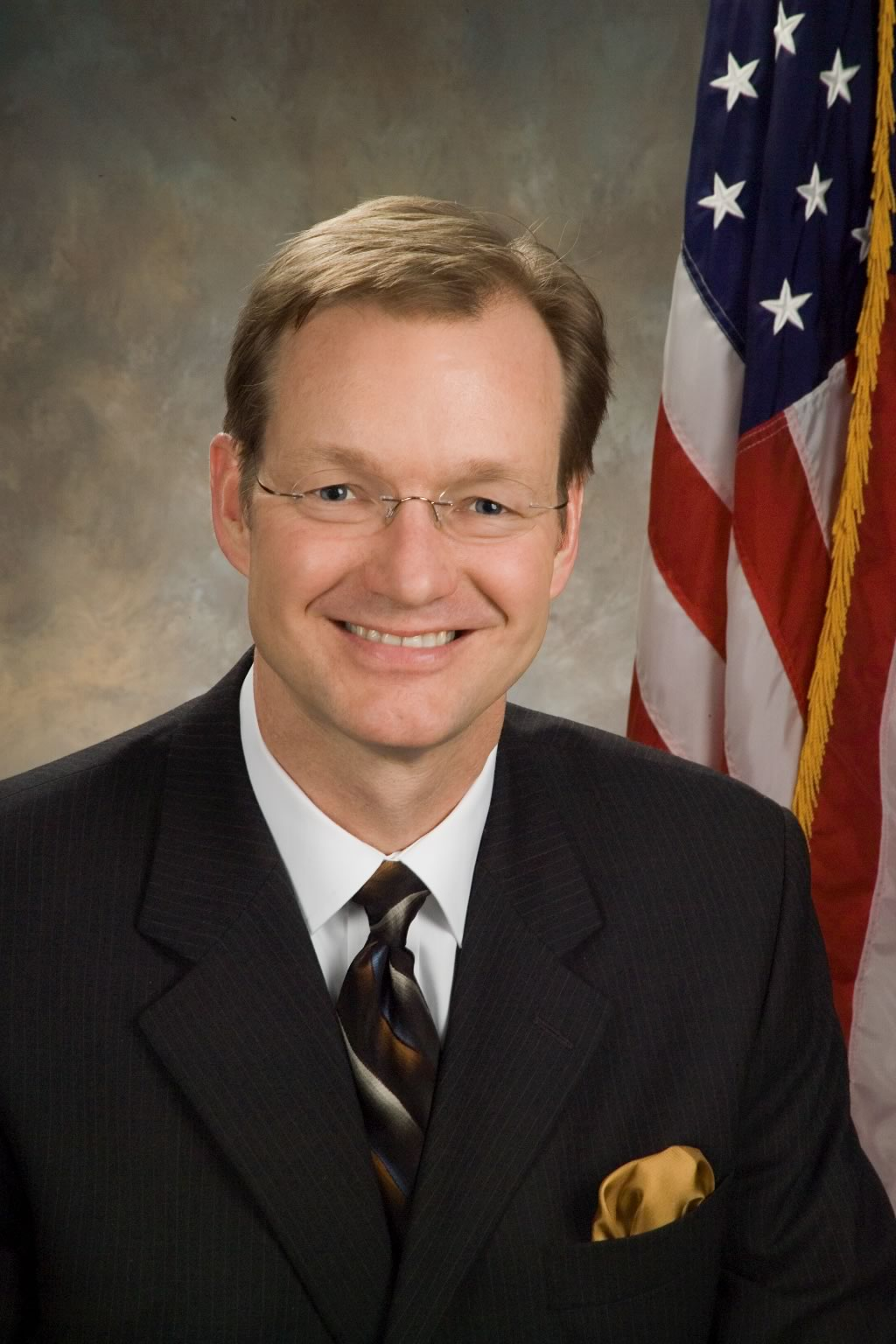

Nominee	Kenny Hulshof	Steven Carroll
Party	Republican	Democratic
Popular vote	172,787	111,662
Percentage	59.3%	38.3%
- County results Hulshof: 50–60% 60–70% 70–80% Carroll: 40–50%
U.S. Representative before election
Kenny Hulshof
Republican
Elected U.S. Representative
Kenny Hulshof
Republican

Incumbent Republican Kenny Hulshof, who was first elected in 1996, ran for re-election. Hulshof was re-elected with 59.3% of the vote.

=== General election ===
==== Results ====
Missouri's 9th congressional district election, 2000
Party	Candidate	Votes	%
Republican	Kenny Hulshof (incumbent)	172,787	59.3
Democratic	Steven Carroll	111,662	38.3
Libertarian	Robert Hoffman	3,608	1.2
Green	Devin Scherubel	2,388	0.8
Reform	Steven D. Dotson	1,165	0.4
Total votes		291,610	100.0
Republican hold			
