= 2004 United States House of Representatives elections in Missouri =

- November 2, 2004

All 9 Missouri seats to the United States House of Representatives
	Majority party	Minority party
Party	Republican	Democratic
Last election	5	4
Seats won	5	4
Seat change	Steady	Steady
Popular vote	1,429,767	1,192,674
Percentage	53.61%	44.72%
Swing	▲0.42%	▼0.01%

Republican
40–50%
50–60%
60–70%
70–80%
80–90%
Democratic
50–60%
60–70%
70–80%

The 2004 House elections in Missouri occurred on November 2, 2004, to elect the members of the State of Missouri's delegation to the United States House of Representatives. Missouri had nine seats in the House, apportioned according to the 2000 United States census.

These elections were held concurrently with the United States presidential election of 2004, United States Senate elections of 2004 (including one in Missouri), the United States House elections in other states, and various state and local elections.

The most notable race of the 2004 cycle in Missouri was the contest for the Third District seat held by outgoing Representative and former House Democratic floor leader Dick Gephardt.

== Overview ==
United States House of Representatives elections in Missouri, 2004
Party	Votes	Percentage	Seats before	Seats after	+/–
Republican	1,429,767	53.61%	5	5	±0
Democratic	1,192,674	44.72%	4	4	±0
Libertarian	33,937	1.27%	0	0	0
Constitution	10,634	0.4%	0	0	0
Independent	11	0.0%	0	0	0
Totals	2,667,023	100.00%	9	9	—
Voter turnout	%				

== Election results ==
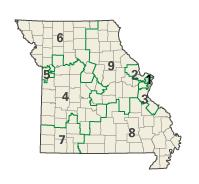
Missouri congressional districts in the 2004 elections

District	Incumbent	Party	First elected	Result	Candidates
Missouri 1	William Lacy Clay Jr.	Democratic	2000	Re-elected	William Lacy Clay, Jr. (D) 75.3% Leslie L. Farr II (R) 22.8% Terry Chadwick (L) 1.4% Robert Rehbein (C) 0.5%
Missouri 2	Todd Akin	Republican	2000	Re-elected	Todd Akin (R) 65.4% George D. Weber (D) 33.0% Darla Maloney (L) 1.4% David Leefe (C) 0.3%
Missouri 3	Dick Gephardt	Democratic	1976	Retired; Democratic hold	Russ Carnahan (D) 52.9% Bill Federer (R) 45.1% Kevin C. Babcock (L) 1.6% William Renaud (C) 0.4%
Missouri 4	Ike Skelton	Democratic	1976	Re-elected	Ike Skelton (D) 66.2% Jim Noland (R) 32.4% Bill Lower (L) 1.0% Raymond Lister (C) 0.4%
Missouri 5	Karen McCarthy	Democratic	1994	Retired; Democratic hold	Emanuel Cleaver (D) 55.2% Jeanne Patterson (R) 42.1% Rick Bailie (L) 2.0% Darin Rodenberg (C) 0.7%
Missouri 6	Sam Graves	Republican	2000	Re-elected	Sam Graves (R) 63.8% Charles S. Broomfield (D) 34.8% Erik Buck (L) 1.4%
Missouri 7	Roy Blunt	Republican	1996	Re-elected	Roy Blunt (R) 70.4% Jim Newberry (D) 28.3% Kevin Craig (L) 0.9% Steve Alger (C) 0.3%
Missouri 8	Jo Ann Emerson	Republican	1996	Re-elected	Jo Ann Emerson (R) 72.2% Dean Henderson (D) 26.6% Stan Cuff (L) 0.7% Leonard Davidson (C) 0.5%
Missouri 9	Kenny Hulshof	Republican	1996	Re-elected	Kenny Hulshof (R) 64.6% Linda Jacobsen (D) 33.8% Tamara A. Millay (L) 1.1% Chris Earl (C) 0.5%

== District 1 ==
2004 Missouri's 1st congressional district election
- November 2, 2004
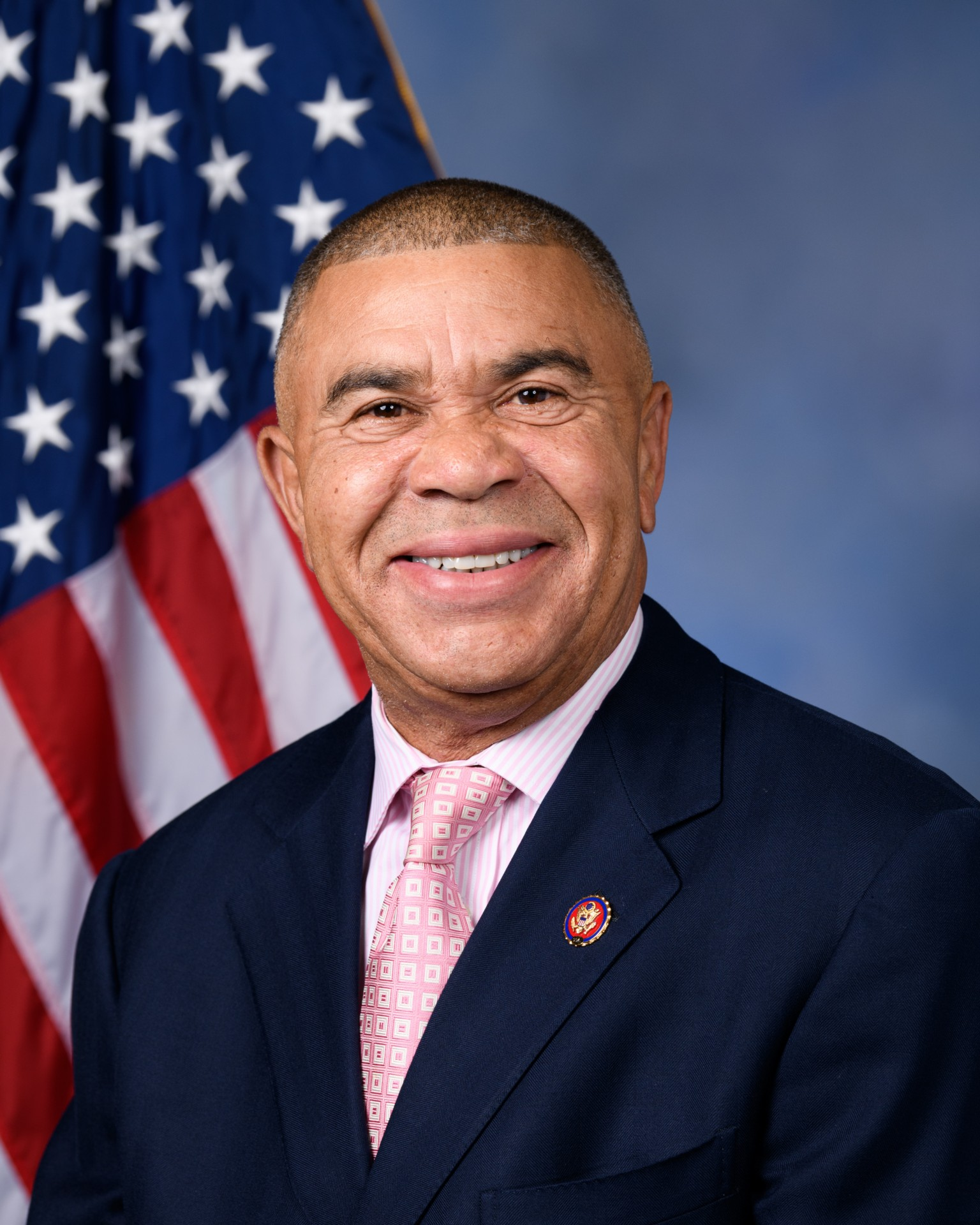

Nominee	William Lacy Clay, Jr.	Leslie L. Farr II
Party	Democratic	Republican
Popular vote	213,658	64,791
Percentage	75.3%	22.8%
- County results Clay: 70–80% 90–100%
U.S. Representative before election
William Lacy Clay Jr.
Democratic
Elected U.S. Representative
William Lacy Clay, Jr.
Democratic

Incumbent Democrat William Lacy Clay Jr., who was first elected in 2000, ran for re-election. Jr. was re-elected with 75.3% of the vote.

=== General election ===
==== Results ====
Missouri's 1st congressional district election, 2004
Party	Candidate	Votes	%
Democratic	William Lacy Clay, Jr. (incumbent)	213,658	75.3
Republican	Leslie L. Farr II	64,791	22.8
Libertarian	Terry Chadwick	3,937	1.4
Constitution	Robert Rehbein	1,385	0.5
Total votes		283,771	100.0
Democratic hold			

== District 2 ==
2004 Missouri's 2nd congressional district election
- November 2, 2004
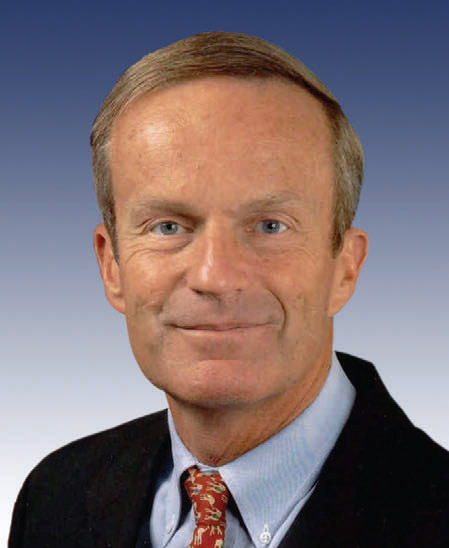

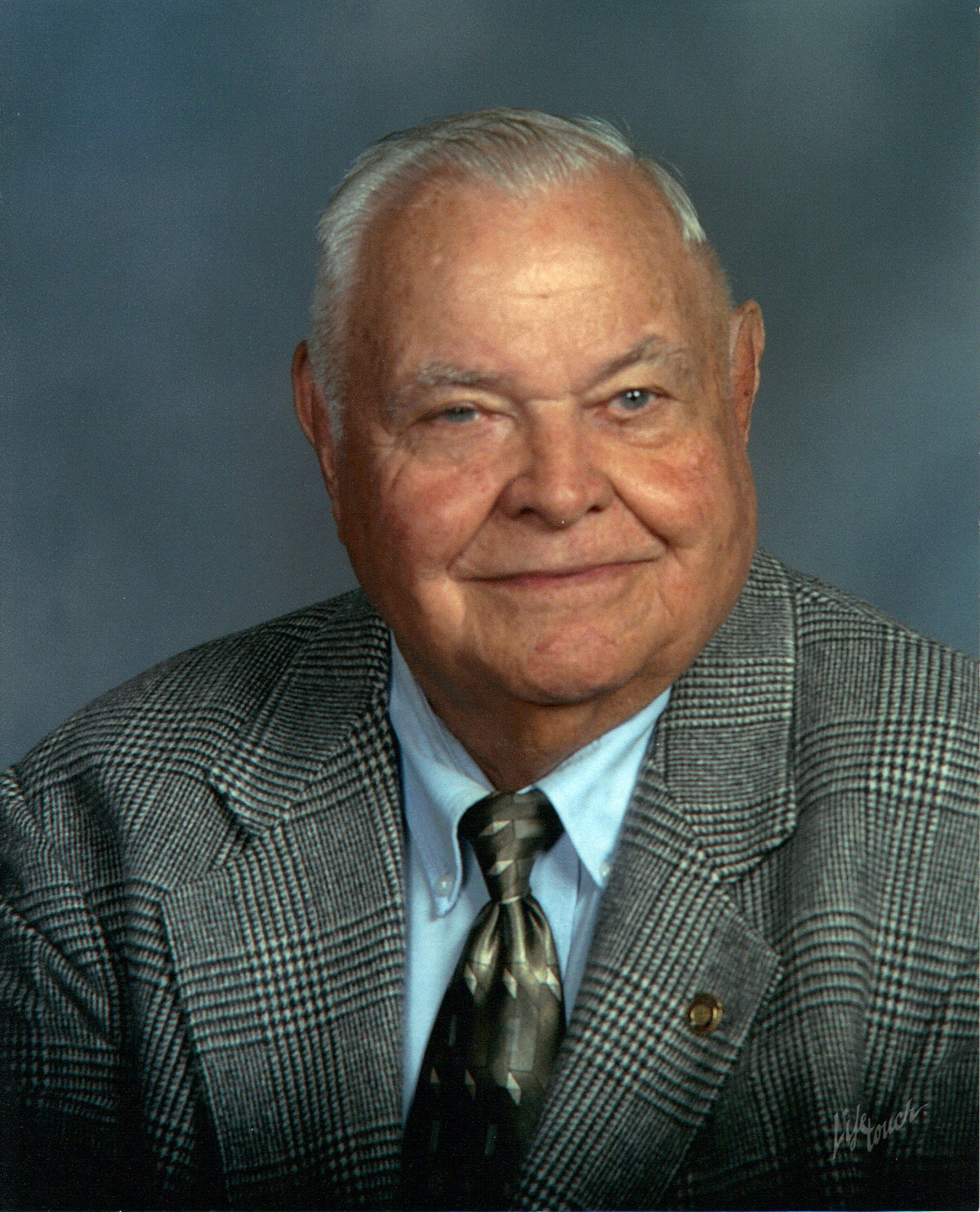
Nominee	Todd Akin	George D. Weber
Party	Republican	Democratic
Popular vote	228,725	115,366
Percentage	65.4%	33.0%
- County results Akin: 60–70%
U.S. Representative before election
Todd Akin
Republican
Elected U.S. Representative
Todd Akin
Republican

Incumbent Republican Todd Akin, who was first elected in 2000, ran for re-election. Akin was re-elected with 65.4% of the vote.

=== General election ===
==== Results ====
Missouri's 2nd congressional district election, 2004
Party	Candidate	Votes	%
Republican	Todd Akin (incumbent)	228,725	65.4
Democratic	George D. Weber	115,366	33.0
Libertarian	Darla Maloney	4,822	1.4
Constitution	David Leefe	954	0.3
Total votes		349,867	100.0
Republican hold			

== District 3 ==
2004 Missouri's 3rd congressional district election
- November 2, 2004
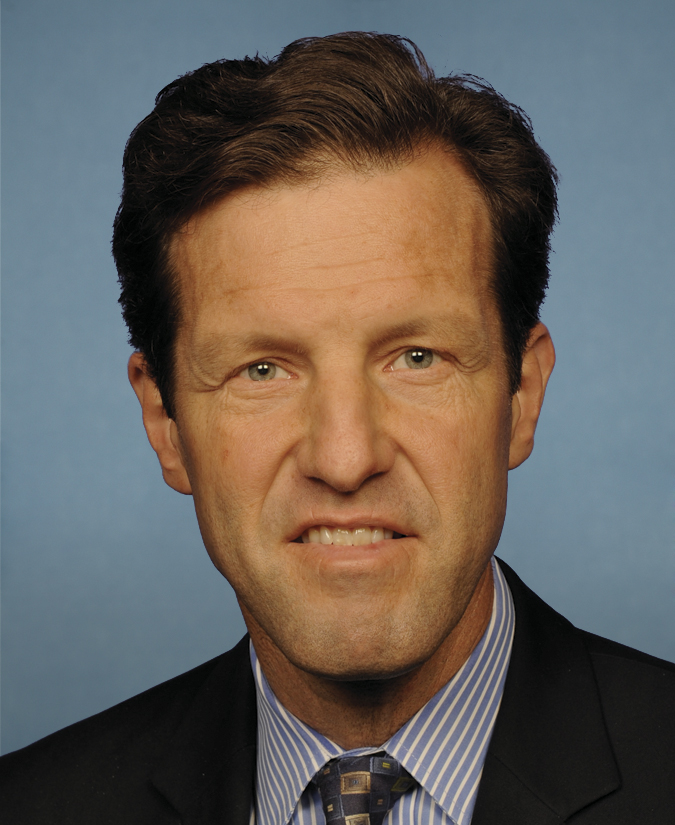

Nominee	Russ Carnahan	Bill Federer
Party	Democratic	Republican
Popular vote	146,894	125,422
Percentage	52.9%	45.1%
U.S. Representative before election
Dick Gephardt
Democratic
Elected U.S. Representative
Russ Carnahan
Democratic

Incumbent Democrat Dick Gephardt, who was first elected in 1976, retired. Russ Carnahan won the open seat with 52.9% of the vote.

=== General election ===
==== Results ====
Missouri's 3rd congressional district election, 2004
Party	Candidate	Votes	%
Democratic	Russ Carnahan	146,894	52.9
Republican	Bill Federer	125,422	45.1
Libertarian	Kevin C. Babcock	4,367	1.6
Constitution	William Renaud	1,222	0.4
Write-In	Joseph L. Badaracco	11	0.0
Total votes		277,916	100.0
Democratic hold			

== District 4 ==
2004 Missouri's 4th congressional district election
- November 2, 2004
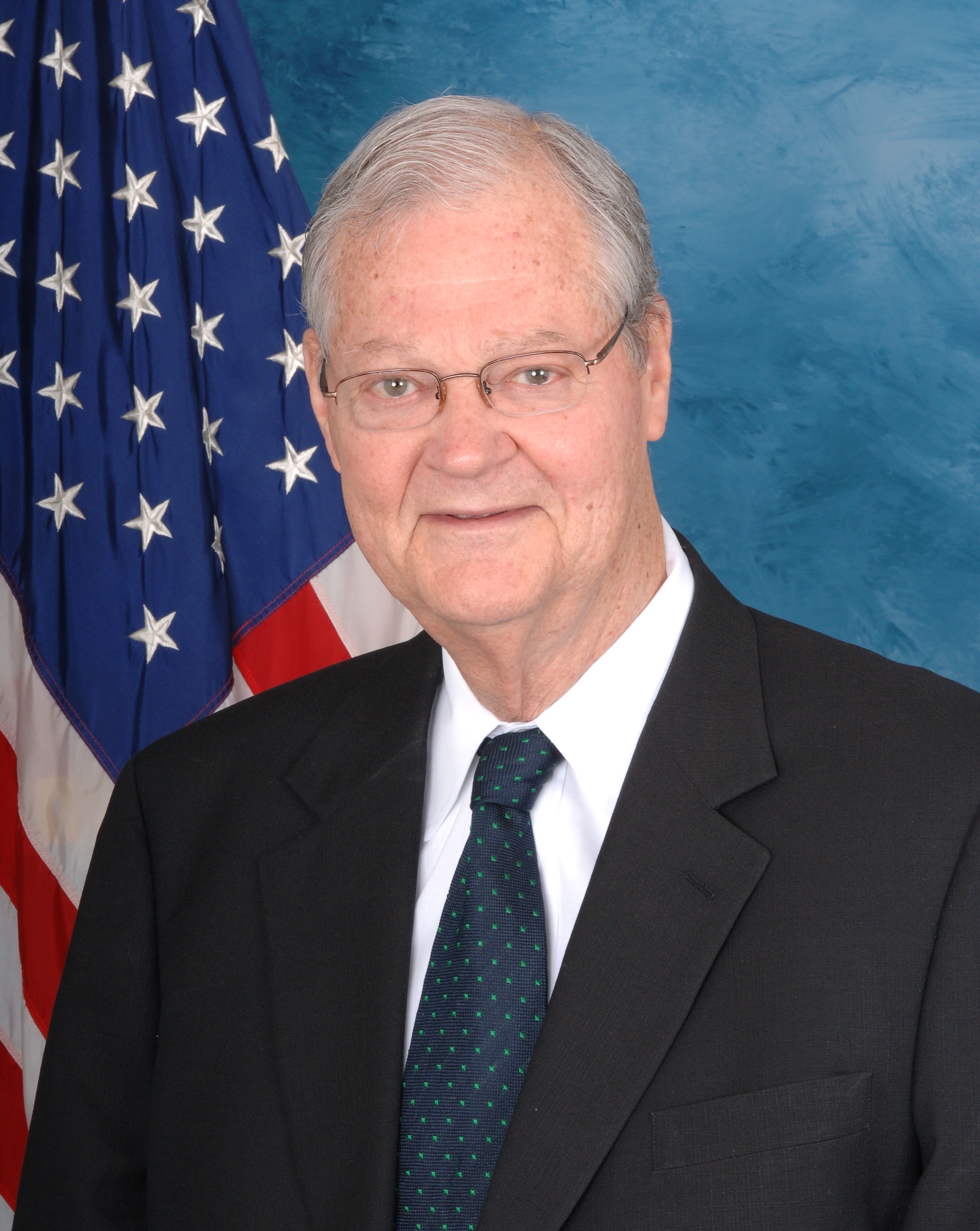

Nominee	Ike Skelton	Jim Noland
Party	Democratic	Republican
Popular vote	190,800	93,334
Percentage	66.2%	32.4%
- County results Skelton: 40–50% 50–60% 60–70% 70–80% Noland: 50–60%
U.S. Representative before election
Ike Skelton
Democratic
Elected U.S. Representative
Ike Skelton
Democratic

Incumbent Democrat Ike Skelton, who was first elected in 1976, ran for re-election. Skelton was re-elected with 66.2% of the vote.

=== General election ===
==== Results ====
Missouri's 4th congressional district election, 2004
Party	Candidate	Votes	%
Democratic	Ike Skelton (incumbent)	190,800	66.2
Republican	Jim Noland	93,334	32.4
Libertarian	Bill Lower	2,827	1.0
Constitution	Raymond Lister	1,265	0.4
Total votes		288,226	100.0
Democratic hold			

== District 5 ==
2004 Missouri's 5th congressional district election
- November 2, 2004
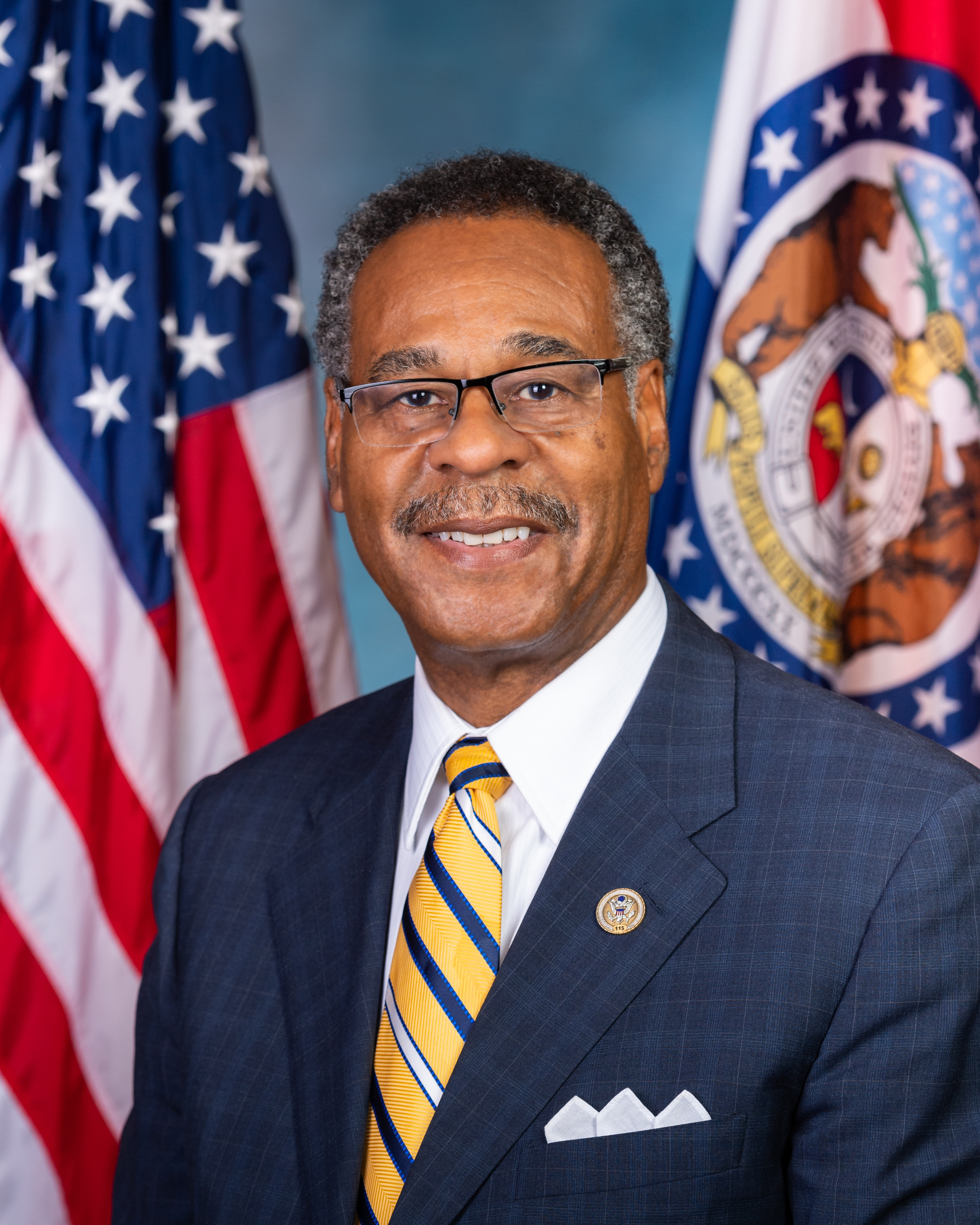

Nominee	Emanuel Cleaver	Jeanne Patterson
Party	Democratic	Republican
Popular vote	161,727	123,431
Percentage	55.2%	42.1%
U.S. Representative before election
Karen McCarthy
Democratic
Elected U.S. Representative
Emanuel Cleaver
Democratic

Incumbent Democrat Karen McCarthy, who was first elected in 1994, retired. Emanuel Cleaver won the open seat with 55.2% of the vote.

=== General election ===
==== Results ====
Missouri's 5th congressional district election, 2004
Party	Candidate	Votes	%
Democratic	Emanuel Cleaver	161,727	55.2
Republican	Jeanne Patterson	123,431	42.1
Libertarian	Rick Bailie	5,827	2.0
Constitution	Darin Rodenberg	2,040	0.7
Total votes		293,025	100.0
Democratic hold			

== District 6 ==
2004 Missouri's 6th congressional district election
- November 2, 2004
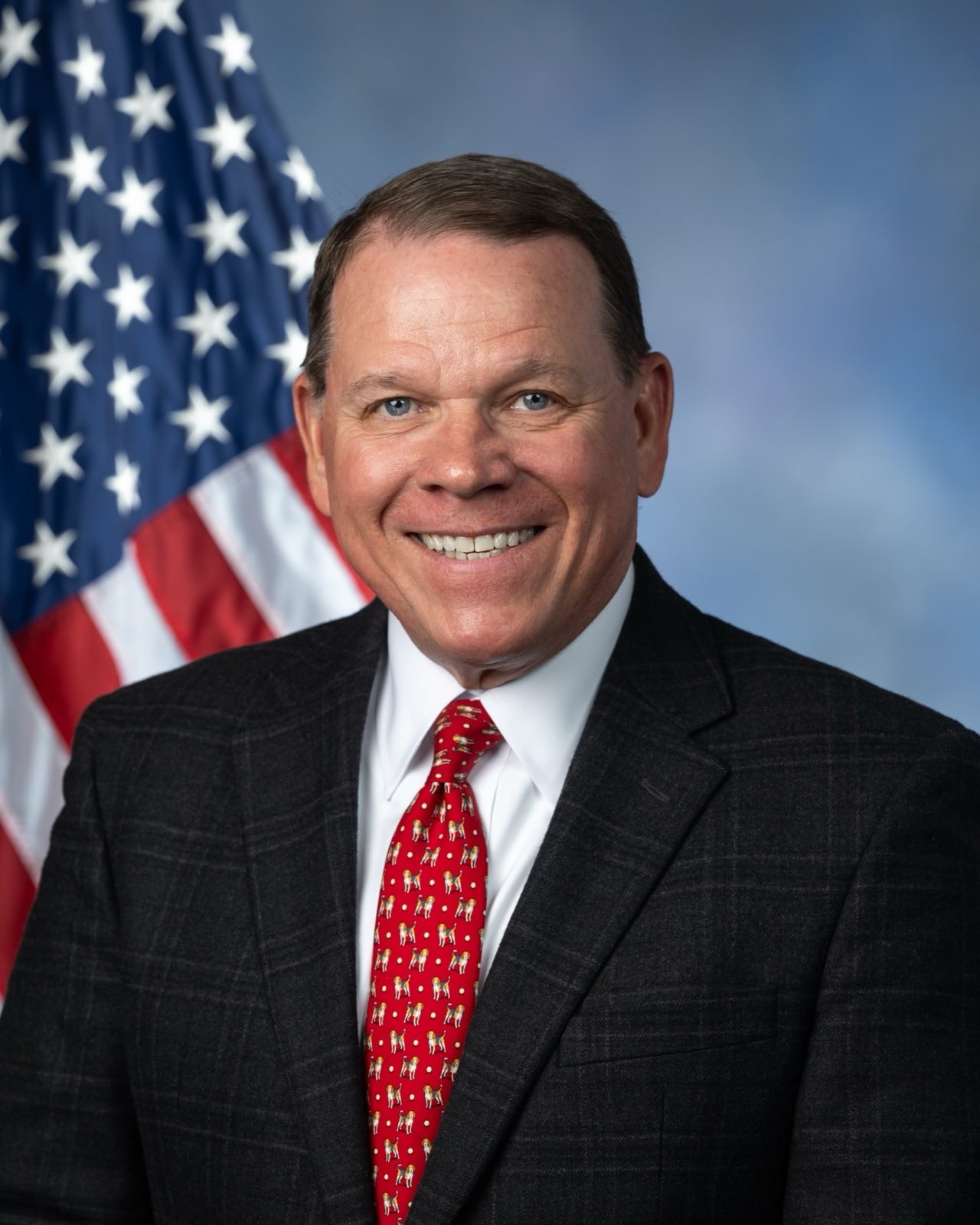

Nominee	Sam Graves	Charles S. Broomfield
Party	Republican	Democratic
Popular vote	196,516	106,987
Percentage	63.8%	34.8%
- County results Graves: 50–60% 60–70% 70–80% 80–90%
U.S. Representative before election
Sam Graves
Republican
Elected U.S. Representative
Sam Graves
Republican

Incumbent Republican Sam Graves, who was first elected in 2000, ran for re-election. Graves was re-elected with 63.8% of the vote.

=== General election ===
==== Results ====
Missouri's 6th congressional district election, 2004
Party	Candidate	Votes	%
Republican	Sam Graves (incumbent)	196,516	63.8
Democratic	Charles S. Broomfield	106,987	34.8
Libertarian	Erik Buck	4,352	1.4
Total votes		307,855	100.0
Republican hold			

== District 7 ==
2004 Missouri's 7th congressional district election
- November 2, 2004
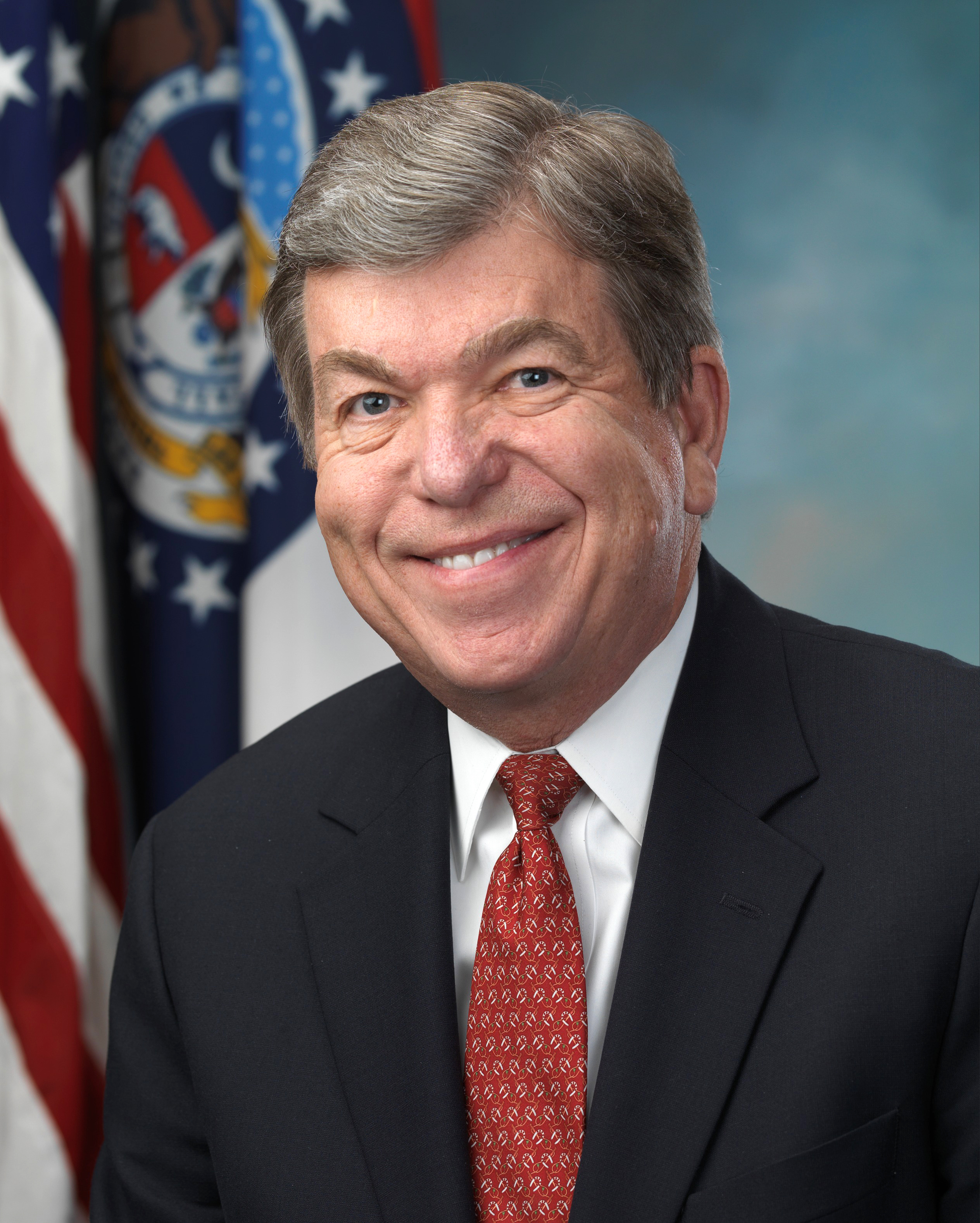

Nominee	Roy Blunt	Jim Newberry
Party	Republican	Democratic
Popular vote	210,080	84,356
Percentage	70.4%	28.3%
- County results Blunt: 60–70% 70–80%
U.S. Representative before election
Roy Blunt
Republican
Elected U.S. Representative
Roy Blunt
Republican

Incumbent Republican Roy Blunt, who was first elected in 1996, ran for re-election. Blunt was re-elected with 70.4% of the vote.

=== General election ===
==== Results ====
Missouri's 7th congressional district election, 2004
Party	Candidate	Votes	%
Republican	Roy Blunt (incumbent)	210,080	70.4
Democratic	Jim Newberry	84,356	28.3
Libertarian	Kevin Craig	2,767	0.9
Constitution	Steve Alger	1,002	0.3
Total votes		298,205	100.0
Republican hold			

== District 8 ==
2004 Missouri's 8th congressional district election
- November 2, 2004
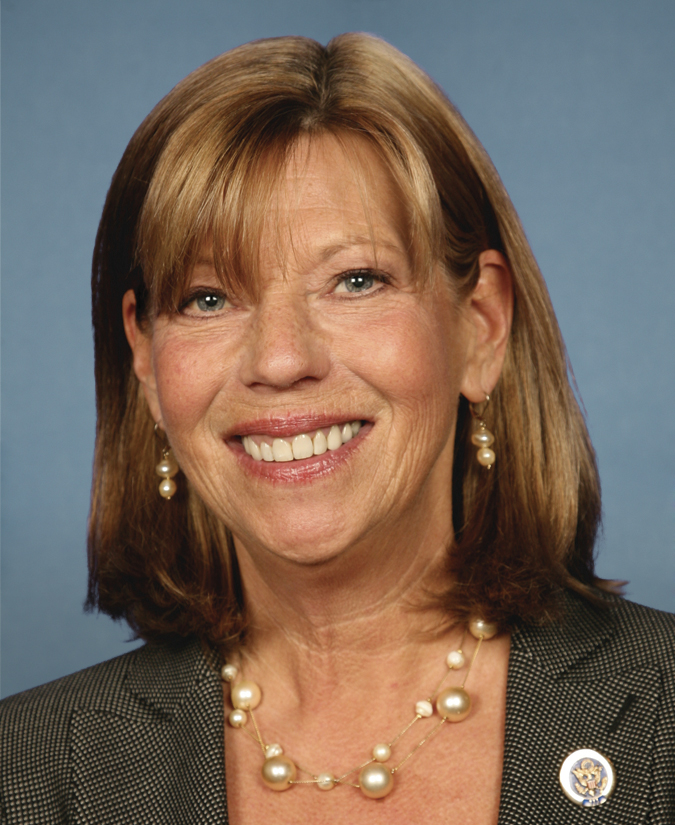

Nominee	Jo Ann Emerson	Dean Henderson
Party	Republican	Democratic
Popular vote	194,039	71,543
Percentage	72.2%	26.6%
- County results Emerson: 50–60% 60–70% 70–80% 80–90%
U.S. Representative before election
Jo Ann Emerson
Republican
Elected U.S. Representative
Jo Ann Emerson
Republican

Incumbent Republican Jo Ann Emerson, who was first elected in 1996, ran for re-election. Emerson was re-elected with 72.2% of the vote.

=== General election ===
==== Results ====
Missouri's 8th congressional district election, 2004
Party	Candidate	Votes	%
Republican	Jo Ann Emerson (incumbent)	194,039	72.2
Democratic	Dean Henderson	71,543	26.6
Libertarian	Stan Cuff	1,810	0.7
Constitution	Leonard Davidson	1,319	0.5
Total votes		268,711	100.0
Republican hold			

== District 9 ==
2004 Missouri's 9th congressional district election
- November 2, 2004
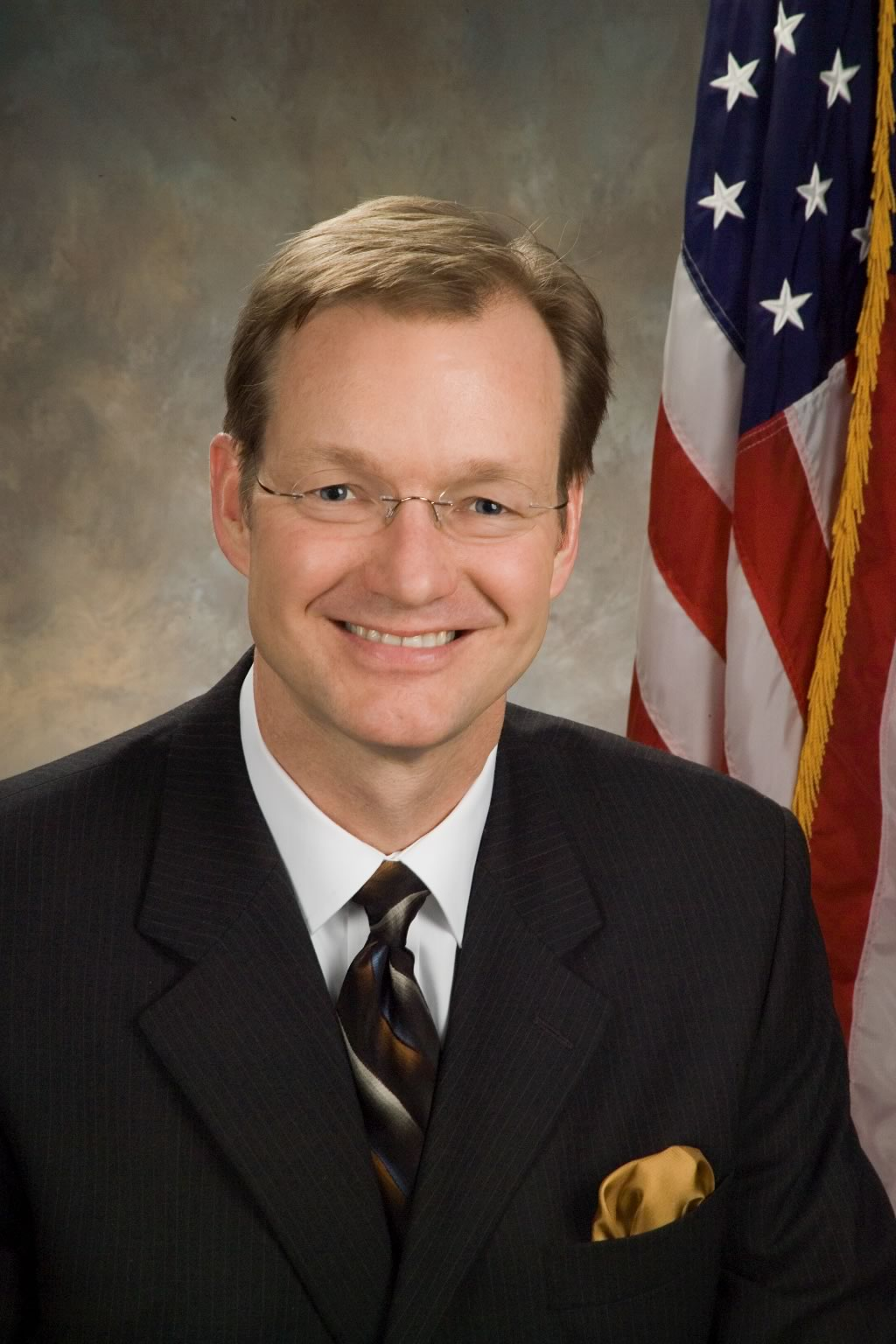

Nominee	Kenny Hulshof	Linda Jacobsen
Party	Republican	Democratic
Popular vote	193,429	101,343
Percentage	64.6%	33.8%
- County results Hulshof: 50–60% 60–70% 70–80% 80–90%
U.S. Representative before election
Kenny Hulshof
Republican
Elected U.S. Representative
Kenny Hulshof
Republican

Incumbent Republican Kenny Hulshof, who was first elected in 1996, ran for re-election. Hulshof was re-elected with 64.6% of the vote.

=== General election ===
==== Results ====
Missouri's 9th congressional district election, 2004
Party	Candidate	Votes	%
Republican	Kenny Hulshof (incumbent)	193,429	64.6
Democratic	Linda Jacobsen	101,343	33.8
Libertarian	Tamara A. Millay	3,228	1.1
Constitution	Chris Earl	1,447	0.5
Total votes		299,447	100.0
Republican hold			
