= Senator Danner =

Senator Danner may refer to:

- Edward Danner (1900–1970), Nebraska State Senate
- Pat Danner (born 1934), Missouri State Senate
- Steve Danner (born 1953), Missouri State Senate
