= Senator Westfall =

Senator Westfall may refer to:

- L. L. Westfall (1865–1927), Washington State Senate
- Morris Westfall (born 1939), Missouri State Senate
