= Jack Jackson =

Jack Jackson may refer to:

- Jack Jackson (radio personality) (1906–1978), British dance band trumpeter, bandleader and radio disc jockey
- Jack Jackson (ice hockey) (1925–2015), retired Canadian professional ice hockey player
- Jack Jackson (1941–2006), American cartoonist known as Jaxon
- Jack Jackson (American football) (born 1972), American football wide receiver
- Jack Jackson Sr. (1933-2023), American politician from Arizona
- Jack Jackson (Missouri politician), American politician from Missouri and highly-decorated Marine Corps aviator
- Jack Jackson Jr., American politician from Arizona
- Jack Jackson (businessman), co-founder of Pep Boys

Jackie Jackson may refer to:

- Jackie Jackson (born 1951), U.S. singer in the Jackson 5
- Jackie Jackson (bassist) (born 1947), Jamaican bass player
- Jumpin Jackie Jackson (1940-2019), former basketball and streetball player

== See also ==
- Union Jack Jackson, fictional British comics character
- Jack Jackson, a fictional character in the novel The Pillars of the Earth and its miniseries
- John Jackson (disambiguation)
