= Samuel Alexander (disambiguation) =

Samuel Alexander (1859–1938) was an Australian-born British philosopher.

Samuel Alexander or Sam Alexander may also refer to:

- Samuel Alexander (banker), English banker
- Samuel David Alexander (1862–1943), Croatian industrialist and philanthropist
- Samuel Davies Alexander (1819–1894), Presbyterian minister.
- Samuel N. Alexander (1910–1967), American computer pioneer
- Samuel Thomas Alexander (1836–1904), founder of Alexander & Baldwin on Maui
- Samuel Kern Alexander (born 1939), American educational theorist and university president
- Sam Alexander (politician), American politician
- Nova (Sam Alexander), Marvel Comics character
- Sam Alexander (Royal Marine) (Samuel Giles William Alexander, 1982−2011)
- Chuffie Alexander (Samuel Alexander, 1902–1989), American baseball player
