= 1994 Missouri State Auditor election =

- November 8, 1994
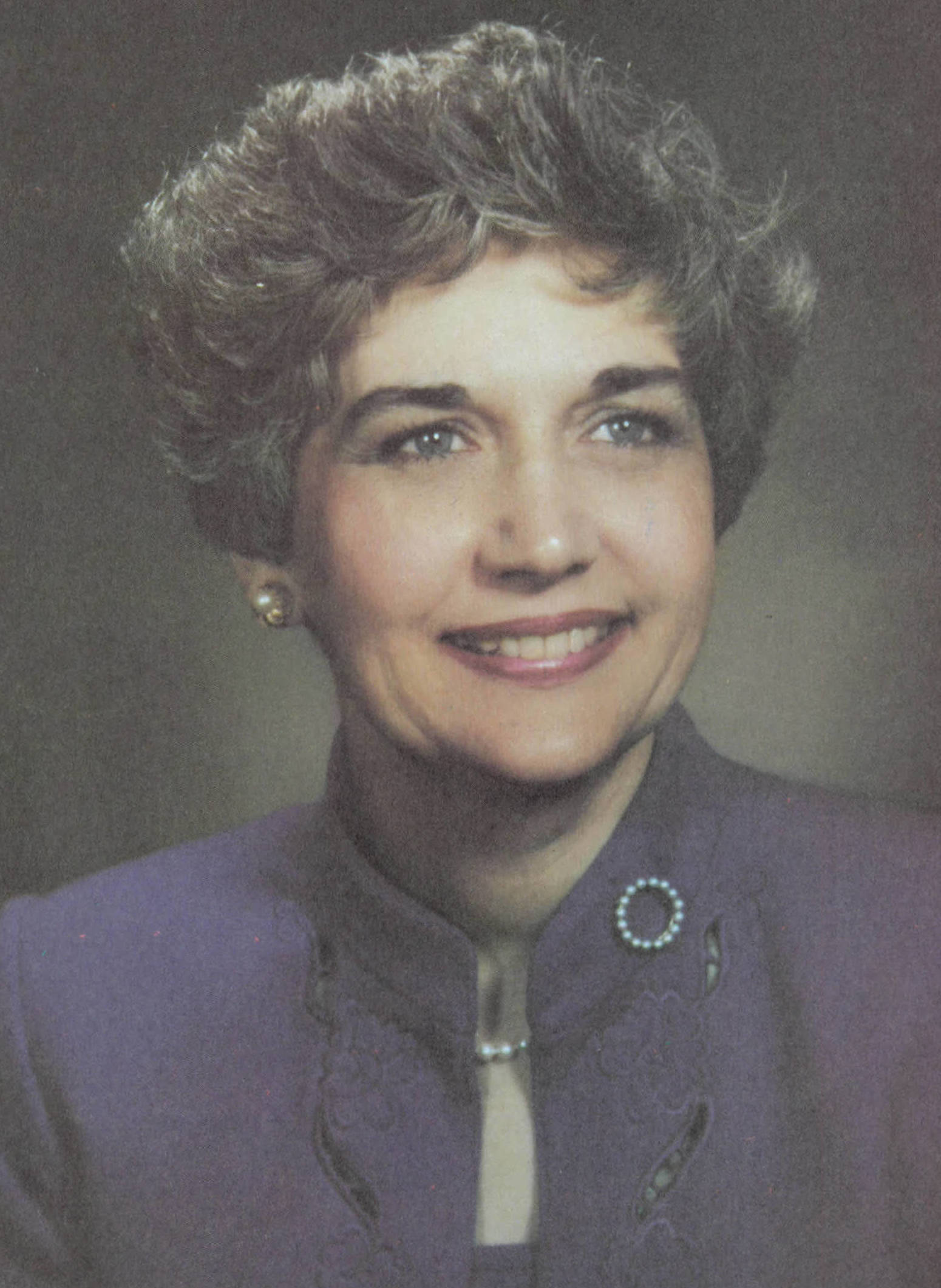

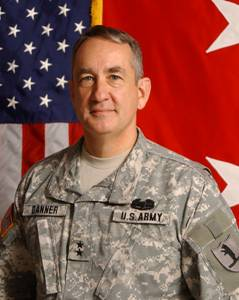
Nominee	Margaret B. Kelly	Steve Danner
Party	Republican	Democratic
Popular vote	1,009,094	678,437
Percentage	57.86%	38.90%
State Auditor before election
Margaret B. Kelly
Republican
Elected State Auditor
Margaret B. Kelly
Republican

The 1994 Missouri State Auditor election was held on November 8, 1994, in order to elect the state auditor of Missouri. Republican nominee and incumbent state auditor Margaret B. Kelly defeated Democratic nominee and incumbent member of the Missouri Senate Steve Danner and Libertarian nominee Grant Stauffer.

== General election ==
On election day, November 8, 1994, Republican nominee Margaret B. Kelly won re-election by a margin of 330,657 votes against her foremost opponent Democratic nominee Steve Danner, thereby retaining Republican control over the office of state auditor. Kelly was sworn in for her third term on January 3, 1995.

=== Results ===
Missouri State Auditor election, 1994
Party	Candidate	Votes	%
Republican	Margaret B. Kelly (incumbent)	1,009,094	57.86
Democratic	Steve Danner	678,437	38.90
Libertarian	Grant Stauffer	56,580	3.24
Total votes		1,744,111	100.00
Republican hold			
