= George D. Weber =

American politician

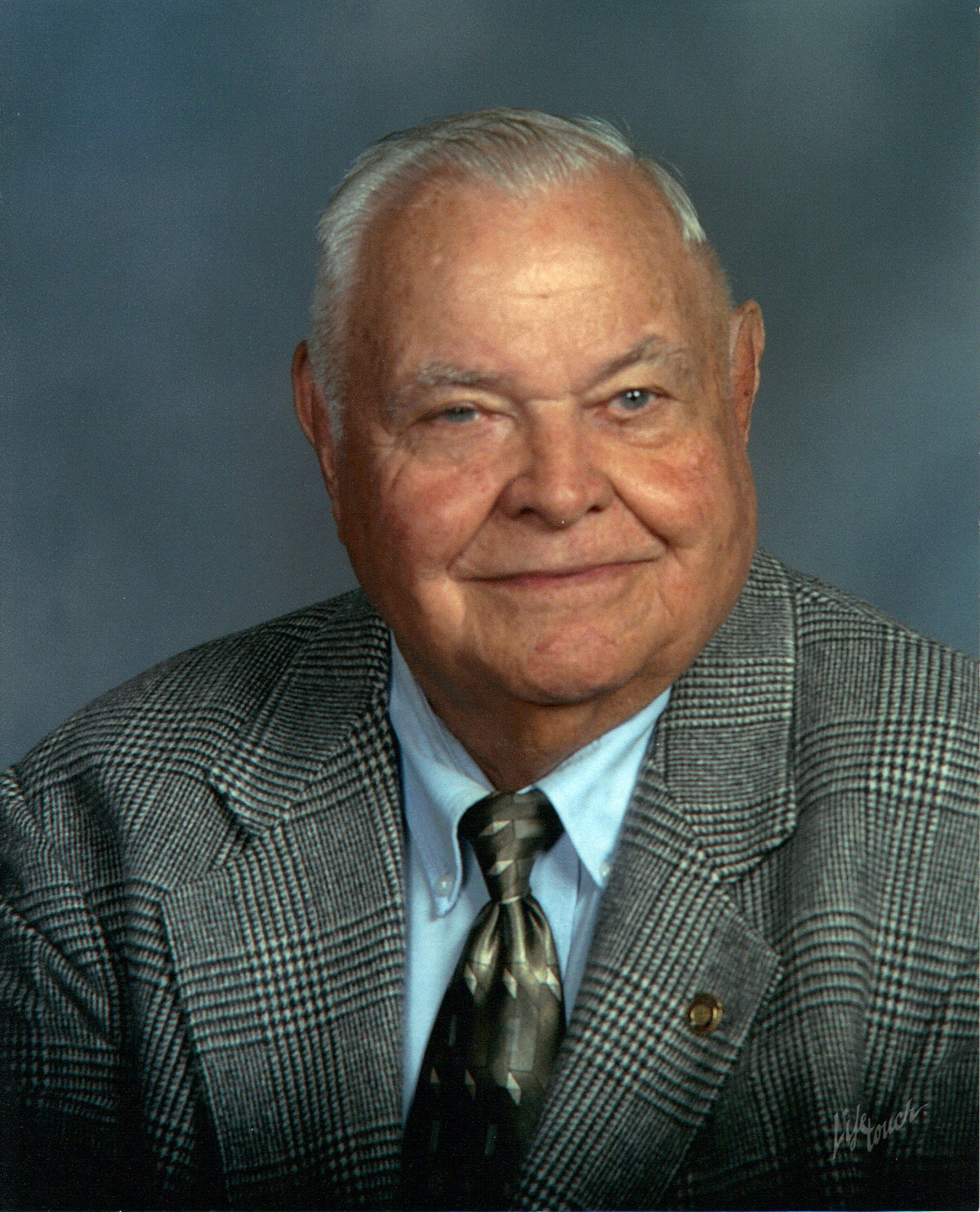

Member of the Missouri House of Representatives
- In office 1962–1966

Personal details
- Born: March 2, 1925 Missouri, U.S.
- Died: November 19, 2012 (aged 87)

George D. "Boots" Weber (March 2, 1925 – November 19, 2012) was an American politician from Missouri. He served a two-year term in the Missouri House of Representatives and then became a perennial candidate, running unsuccessfully for various offices over the course of his life.

== Early life ==
Weber was born to William and Anna Weber on a farm outside of Eureka, Missouri, into a family of seven children. He graduated from Eureka High School in 1942 and went on to attend the University of Missouri.

Prior to his graduation at Missouri, Weber joined the Marine Corps, where he served from 1944 until 1947. After his service, he became a farmer and later a real estate broker and prison guard.

== Political career ==
Weber served as state representative from District 11 in St. Louis County from 1964 to 1966.

Weber lost his first race for Missouri House of Representatives in 1962. He won in 1964 with 51% of the vote, narrowly defeating incumbent Republican Robert O. Snyder, but never again won an election. He lost reelection to Eric F. Fink in 1966, and lost again to Fink when he sought a comeback in 1968. In 1970, Weber ran for the Missouri Senate but lost the Democratic primary. In 1972, he lost the primary for his old House seat by just two votes. In 1974, he lost the primary for state Senate, and in 1976 he ran for Governor of Missouri but lost the primary to Joseph P. Teasdale, coming in sixth place with 1.3% of the vote.

Following his run for governor, Weber lost several more Democratic primaries: for state senate in 1978, for Missouri's 8th congressional district in 1980, for state House in 1990, and for U.S. Senate in 1992. He then joined the Reform Party and was that party's nominee for Missouri Auditor in 1998 and then Lieutenant Governor in 2000.

Also in 2000, Weber ran for President of the United States. He received 9,173 votes among independent voters in California and 217 votes in the Reform Party primaries. After that, he rejoined the Democratic Party. He was the nominee for the 89th district of the Missouri House of Representatives in 2002, losing to Jack Jackson with 27% of the vote. In 2004, he won the primary for Missouri's 2nd congressional district but lost the general election to incumbent Todd Akin. Weber was also the nominee for that seat in 2006, losing again to Akin. He unsuccessfully ran for state House in 2008 and state Senate in 2010. In 2012, Weber narrowly lost his final race, the Democratic primary for Missouri's 2nd district, to Glenn Koenen.

== Personal life and death ==
Weber married his wife, Roberta, in 1947; she died in 2001. Together, they had six children and at the time of his death, Weber had six grandchildren and three great grandchildren.

Weber was diagnosed with mantle cell lymphoma in 2010. Treatment was unsuccessful, and despite being told he had only two months to live in November of that year, he survived for two more years and died November 19, 2012. Weber outlived all but one of his siblings; his brother Bud, who was mayor of Eureka, died in 2016 at age 97.

== Political positions ==
Weber was anti-abortion and pro-gun, but believed existing gun laws need to be better enforced. He was a strong conservationist and believed clean water is about to become a major economic and conservation issue. His conservative social views made him vulnerable to insurgent campaigns in the Democratic primaries in 2004 and 2006, but he narrowly won the nomination both years. The largely progressive Democratic mainstream in St. Louis County, however, was slow to embrace him as a candidate despite his frequent campaigns for office in the area.
