= Tom Coleman (Missouri politician) =

American politician (born 1943)

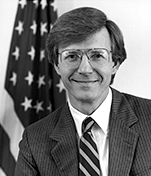

Member of the U.S. House of Representatives from Missouri's 6th district
- In office November 2, 1976 – January 3, 1993
- Preceded by: Jerry Litton
- Succeeded by: Pat Danner

Member of the Missouri House of Representatives from the 21st district
- In office January 1973 – November 2, 1976
- Preceded by: Howard Hines
- Succeeded by: David Christian

Personal details
- Born: Earl Thomas Coleman; May 29, 1943 (age 83) Gladstone, Missouri, U.S.
- Party: Republican
- Education: William Jewell College (BA); New York University (MPA); Washington University in St. Louis (JD)

Earl Thomas Coleman (born May 29, 1943) is an American politician who represented Missouri in the United States House of Representatives from 1976 to 1993.

== Education ==
He attended public schools and received a B.A. from William Jewell College in 1965 and an M.P.A. from Wagner Graduate School of Public Service, in 1969. He also received a J.D. from Washington University School of Law in 1969. He was admitted to the Missouri Bar in 1969 and commenced practice in Kansas City.

== Career ==
From 1969 to 1972, Coleman, a Republican, served as Missouri's State Assistant Attorney General. In 1972, he was elected to the Missouri House of Representatives, where he served until 1976. After the unexpected death of U.S. Representative Jerry Litton, who represented Missouri's 6th congressional district, Coleman was elected to succeed him. He ran in and won two elections that day—a special election for the remainder of Litton's second term, and a regular election for a full two-year term.

Coleman's district encompassed northwestern Missouri, including a portion of Kansas City north of the Missouri River and the city of Saint Joseph. Coleman won reelection every two years thereafter until 1992, when he was defeated for reelection by Democrat Pat Danner, Litton's former district administrator.

After leaving office, he has worked for The Livingston Group, a lobbying organization founded by former Congressman Bob Livingston.

== Later career ==
Coleman wrote an opinion piece in May 2019 declaring that the Trump presidency was illegitimate and that Trump and Mike Pence should be impeached. In August 2020, Coleman was one of 24 former Republican lawmakers to endorse Democratic presidential nominee Joe Biden on the opening day of the Republican National Convention.

He currently sits on the bipartisan advisory board of States United Democracy Center.

U.S. House of Representatives
Preceded by Jerry Litton	Member of the U.S. House of Representatives from Missouri's 6th congressional district 1976–1993	Succeeded by Pat Danner
Preceded by Edward Rell Madigan	Ranking Member of the House Agriculture Committee; 1991–1993	Succeeded by Pat Roberts
U.S. order of precedence (ceremonial)
Preceded by Dan Lipinski as Former U.S. Representative	Order of precedence of the United States as Former U.S. Representative	Succeeded by Jo Ann Emerson as Former U.S. Representative
