= David Doctorian =

American politician (1934–2023)

Member of the Missouri Senate from the 28th district
- In office February 21, 1977 – January 9, 1991
- Preceded by: Ike Skelton
- Succeeded by: Steve Danner

Personal details
- Born: November 9, 1934 Beirut, Lebanon
- Died: January 12, 2023 (aged 88)
- Party: Republican

David Doctorian (November 9, 1934 – January 12, 2023) was an American politician who served in the Missouri Senate from the 28th district from 1977 to 1991.

Doctorian died on January 12, 2023, at the age of 88.
