= Sam Alexander (politician) =

American politician

Member-elect of the Missouri Senate from the 28th district
- Assuming office January 12, 2027
- Succeeding: Sandy Crawford

Personal details
- Party: Republican
- Website: alexanderformo.com

Sam Alexander is an American politician of the Missouri Republican Party who is the representative-elect for the 28th district in the Missouri State Senate. He was elected at the 2026 election. He is a physician.
