= Ted House =

American politician (born 1959)

Ted House (born August 22, 1959) is an American circuit judge assigned to St. Charles County and a former Democratic politician who served in the Missouri Senate for the 2nd District. Between 1989 and 1993, he served in the Missouri House of Representatives. He previously served as field representative for U.S. Congressman Ike Skelton.

House was born in Kansas City. In 1977, he graduated from Fayette High School. He has a Bachelor of Arts in political science from Central Methodist University and a Juris Doctor degree from University of Missouri-Kansas City law school.

In 2011, House became the new president of the Missouri Circuit Judges Association, succeeding Judge Kathleen Forsyth of Jackson County. He was elected associate circuit judge in 2002 and circuit judge in 2004, being re-elected as circuit judge in 2008.
