= Sandy Crawford =

American politician

Member of the Missouri Senate from the 28th district
- Incumbent
- Assumed office August 8, 2017
- Preceded by: Mike Parson
- Succeeded by: Sam Alexander (elect)

Member of the Missouri House of Representatives from the 129th district
- In office January 9, 2013 – August 8, 2017
- Preceded by: Bill White
- Succeeded by: Jeff Knight

Member of the Missouri House of Representatives from the 119th district
- In office January 5, 2011 – January 9, 2013
- Preceded by: Larry Wilson
- Succeeded by: Dave Hinson

Personal details
- Born: October 1, 1957 (age 69) Buffalo, Missouri, U.S.
- Party: Republican
- Spouse: John
- Education: Missouri State University (BS)

Sandy Crawford is an American politician. A Republican, she represents the 28th District in the Missouri Senate, which encompasses Benton County, Cedar County, Dallas County, Henry County, Hickory County, Pettis County, Polk County, St. Clair County, and Vernon County. She was elected in an August 2017 special election. Crawford previously served as the House Majority Whip, and in the Missouri House from 2010 to August 2017.

== Personal life ==
Crawford was born October 1, 1957, in Buffalo, Missouri. She graduated from Buffalo High School in 1975, and married husband John in 1976. Ten years after high school Crawford began taking college classes at night while also working in the banking industry during the day, eventually earning a Bachelor of Science degree in Finance from Missouri State University in 1995. Later, in 1998, she would earn an advanced degree from the Graduate School of Banking at Colorado. When not involved with her legislative duties in Jefferson City, Crawford assists her husband John in running their livestock production operation (beef cattle).

== Political career ==
Crawford was first elected to the Missouri House of Representatives in 2010. Previously her involvement in politics consisted of serving as Chairperson of the Dallas County (Missouri) Republican Central Committee. She defeated fellow Republican Warren Love by just under 1,400 votes to win the August, 2010 Primary. In the November, 2010 general election she won nearly sixty-six percent of the vote to defeat Democrat John L. Wilson and Constitution Party candidate Raymond Kish for the right to represent the 119th District in the Missouri House of Representatives.

Following the 2010 U.S. census all Missouri House of Representative districts were reapportioned and district boundaries redrawn. Since Sandy Crawford's home was in the newly created 129th District, she ran for that House seat in 2012. In the August, 2012 Republican primary Crawford faced off with Randy Angst, who had represented the 146th District prior to the redrawn boundaries. Crawford was victorious in the primary with a bit over fifty-five percent of the ballots cast in her favor. The November general election again pitted Crawford against Democratic opponent John L. Wilson, who she soundly defeated in 2010. The margin of victory for Crawford was even larger in 2012, as she received nearly seventy-seven percent of all votes cast.

Soon after 97th General Assembly began their first session, Representative Crawford was elected to serve as House Majority Whip by fellow Republicans.

In 2024, Crawford opposed legislation that would allow abortion in cases of rape or incest. She argued, "God is perfect. God does not make mistakes."

== Election history ==
Missouri 119th District State Representative Election 2010
Party	Candidate	Votes	%
Republican	Sandy Crawford	9,006	65.72
Democratic	John L. Wilson	3,952	28.84
Constitution	Raymond Kish	746	5.44

Missouri 129th District State Representative Election 2012
Party	Candidate	Votes	%
Republican	Sandy Crawford	12,032	76.71
Democratic	John L. Wilson	3,653	23.29

Missouri 129th District State Representative Election 2014
Party	Candidate	Votes	%
Republican	Sandy Crawford	6,284	83.06
Democratic	John L. Wilson	1,282	16.94

Missouri 129th District State Representative Election 2016
Party	Candidate	Votes	%
Republican	Sandy Crawford	14,260	88.56
Independent	Charles Matranga	1,842	11.44

Missouri 28th State Senate District Special Election 2017
Party	Candidate	Votes	%
Republican	Sandy Crawford	9,768	68.28
Democratic	Albert J. Skalicky	4,538	31.72

Missouri 28th State Senate District Election 2018
Party	Candidate	Votes	%	±%
Republican	Sandy Crawford	53,693	79.17	+10.89
Democratic	Joe Poor	14,126	20.83	−10.89

Missouri 28th State Senate District Election 2022
Party	Candidate	Votes	%	±%
Republican	Sandy Crawford	55,062	100.00%	+20.83
