= Missouri's 28th Senate district =

American legislative district

Missouri's 28th State Senate district
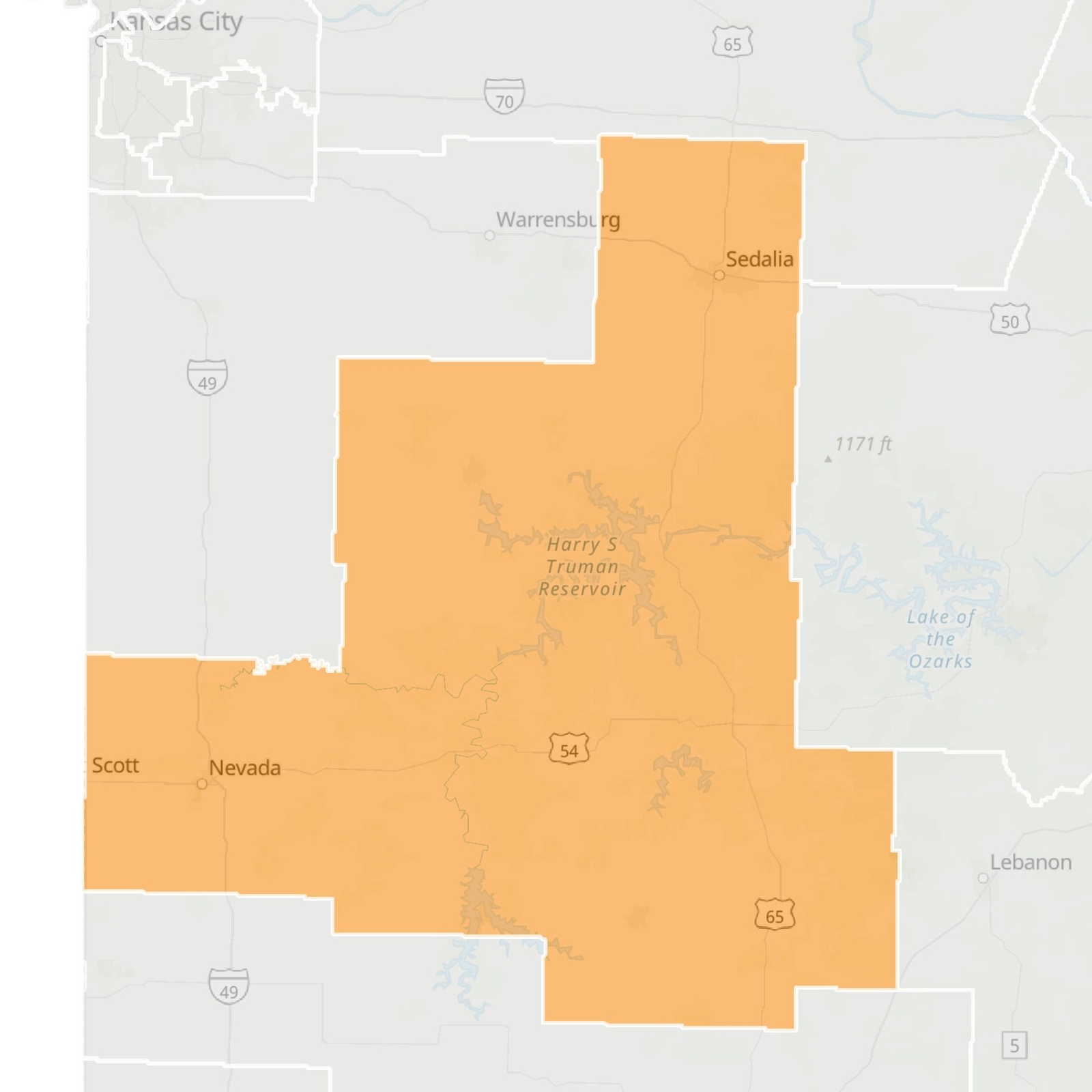
Senator
Sandy Crawford; R–Buffalo
- Demographics: 90% White; 1% Black; 4% Hispanic; 4% Multiracial
- Population (2023): 186,844

Missouri's 28th Senatorial District is one of 34 districts in the Missouri Senate. The district has been represented by Republican Sandy Crawford since 2017.

== Geography ==
The district is based in western Missouri and includes all of Benton, Cedar, Dallas, Henry, Hickory, Pettis, Polk, St. Clair and Vernon counties. Major municipalities in the district include Bolivar, Clinton, Nevada, and Sedalia. The district is also home to the Harry S. Truman Reservoir, Southwest Baptist University, and most of Stockton Lake.

== 2026 candidates ==
=== Republican primary ===
- Sam Alexander, ER physician and candidate for Missouri's 7th congressional district in 2022
- Bradley Pollitt, state representative of District 52

=== Democratic primary ===
- Mike McCaffree, real estate agent

== Election results (1998–2022) ==
=== 1998 ===
Missouri's 28th Senatorial District election (1998)
Party	Candidate	Votes	%
Republican	Morris Westfall	40,402	87.1
Constitution	Marvalene Pankey	5,976	12.9
Total votes		46,378	100.0

=== 2002 ===
Missouri's 28th Senatorial District election (2002)
Party	Candidate	Votes	%
Republican	Delbert L. Scott	37,543	65.4
Democratic	Catherine D. Johnson	18,703	32.6
Libertarian	Jesse O. Watson	1,179	2.1
Total votes		57,425	100.0
Republican hold			

=== 2006 ===
Missouri's 28th Senatorial District election (2006)
Party	Candidate	Votes	%
Republican	Delbert L. Scott (incumbent)	36,287	57.2
Independent	Mike Holzknecht	27,128	42.8
Total votes		63,415	100.0
Republican hold			

=== 2010 ===
Missouri's 28th Senatorial District election (2010)
Party	Candidate	Votes	%
Republican	Mike Parson	47,380	83.7
Constitution	Bennie B. Hatfield	9,213	16.3
Total votes		56,593	100.0
Republican hold			

=== 2014 ===
Missouri's 28th Senatorial District election (2014)
Party	Candidate	Votes	%
Republican	Mike Parson (incumbent)	34,573	100.0
Total votes		34,573	100.0
Republican hold			

=== 2017 ===
Missouri's 28th Senatorial District special election (2017)
Party	Candidate	Votes	%
Republican	Sandy Crawford	9,771	68.3
Democratic	Albert J. Skalicky	4,539	31.7
Total votes		67,818	100.0
Republican hold			

=== 2018 ===
Missouri's 28th Senatorial District election (2018)
Party	Candidate	Votes	%
Republican	Sandy Crawford	53,692	79.2
Democratic	Joe Poor	14,126	20.8
Total votes		67,818	100.0
Republican hold			

=== 2022 ===
Missouri's 28th Senatorial District election (2022)
Party	Candidate	Votes	%
Republican	Sandy Crawford (incumbent)	55,062	100.0
Total votes		55,062	100.0
Republican hold			

== Statewide election results ==
Year	Office	Results
2008	President	McCain 60.2 – 37.1%
2012	President	Romney 67.9 – 32.1%
2016	President	Trump 74.8 – 20.8%
2016	Senate	Blunt 63.2 – 31.8%
2016	Governor	Greitens 64.3 – 32.6%
2018	Senate	Hawley 68.7 – 27.4%
2020	President	Trump 77.2 – 21.1%
2020	Governor	Parson 77.4 – 20.5%
