= Robert O. Snyder =

American politician (1917–2016)

Member of the U.S. House of Representatives from Missouri's 95th district

Missouri House of Representatives
- In office 1961–1977

Personal details
- Born: 1917 Lima, Ohio, US
- Died: 2016 (aged 98–99)
- Party: Republican
- Spouse: Margaret E. Beaton
- Children: 3 (1 sons, 2 daughters)
- Occupation: attorney

Robert Oscar Snyder (July 25, 1917 – May 25, 2016) was an American Republican politician who served in the Missouri House of Representatives. He was born in Lima, Ohio, and was educated at Lima Central High School and Ohio University in Athens, Ohio. On February 8, 1941, he married Margaret E. Beaton in Bridgeport, Connecticut. He served in the United States Navy during World War II, serving on a destroyer in the Mediterranean, Atlantic, and Pacific theaters. He passed the Missouri Bar in 1951. In 1977, Snyder was appointed to the Missouri Court of Appeals, Eastern District.
