= L. L. Westfall =

American politician (1865–1927)

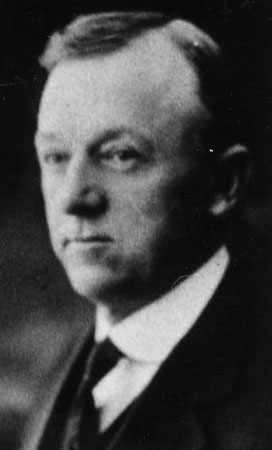
- Westfall in 1919

Member of the Washington House of Representatives for the 2nd district
- In office 1917–1921

Member of the Washington State Senate for the 3rd district
- In office 1921–1927

Personal details
- Born: April 5, 1865 McDonough County, Illinois, United States
- Died: January 31, 1927 (aged 61) Spokane, Washington, United States
- Party: Republican

Linneus Lincoln Westfall (April 5, 1865 – January 31, 1927) was an American politician in the state of Washington. He served in the Washington House of Representatives and Washington State Senate.
