= Mike Odell =

American businessman

Michael R. Odell was the chief executive officer at Pep Boys from September 22, 2008, until September 26, 2014, and its president from 2008 until 2014. He was an interim chief executive officer at Pep Boys from April 23, 2008, to September 2008 and its executive vice president and chief operating officer from September 17, 2007, to April 2008.

Before that he was an executive vice president and general manager of Sears Retail & Specialty Stores, a $27 billion division of Sears Holdings Corporation. He joined Sears in its finance department in 1994 until he joined Sears' operations team in 1998. Odell held executive operations positions of increasing responsibility, including vice president of stores, finance and operations at Sears Automotive Group. He began his career with Deloitte & Touche in Chicago, Illinois, as its CPA. He has been a director of Meritage Homes Corporation since December 2011.

Odell holds an M.B.A. from Northwestern University's Kellogg School of Management, and a B.S. in accounting from the University of Denver's Daniels College of Business.
