= Jack Jackson (Missouri politician) =

Former American politician

Member of the Missouri House of Representatives from the 89th district

Personal details
- Born: November 13, 1942 (age 83) Sullivan, Indiana, U.S.
- Party: Republican
- Spouse: Arleen Henderlong
- Occupation: aviator, politician

Jack Jackson (born November 13, 1942, in Sullivan, Indiana) is an American politician and highly decorated Marine Corps aviator who served as a Missouri state representative. Jackson also ran for office to become state senator and state auditor.

Jackson is the recipient of thirty-three air medals, four distinguished flying crosses, and the Navy commendation for valor. During Operation Desert Storm, he returned to active duty to train pilots on how to fly the Harrier jump jet. As a civilian, Jackson served as the chief test pilot for Boeing in St. Louis where he was responsible for flying and evaluating military aircraft.
