= Steve Danner =

American politician (born 1953)

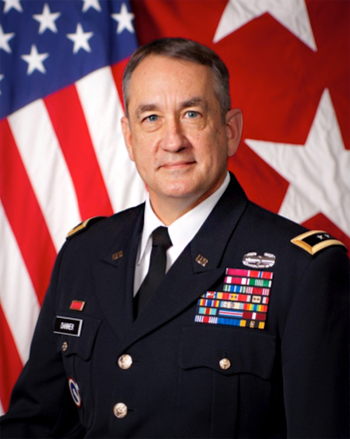

Member of the Missouri Senate from the 28th district
- In office January 9, 1991 – January 4, 1995
- Preceded by: David Doctorian
- Succeeded by: Morris Westfall

Member of the Missouri House of Representatives from the 11th district
- In office January 5, 1983 – July 31, 1987
- Preceded by: Ralph L. Moore
- Succeeded by: Dale Whiteside

Personal details
- Born: May 3, 1953 (age 73) Macon, Missouri
- Party: Democratic
- Relatives: Pat Danner (mother)

Stephen L. Danner (born May 3, 1953) is an American politician who served in the Missouri House of Representatives from the 11th district from 1983 to 1987 and in the Missouri Senate from the 28th district from 1991 to 1995.

== Background ==
Danner was born in Macon, Missouri. He received his B.A. degree in history from University of Missouri–Kansas City and his J.D. degree from University of Missouri School of Law. Danner was admitted to the Missouri bar and practiced law in Smithville, Missouri. He was involved in construction and motel management. From 1987 to 1989, Danner served as a Missouri Administrative Law Judge.

Danner served in the United States Army and the Missouri National Guard, where he served as the adjutant general of the Missouri National Guard from 2009 to 2019, retiring with the rank of major general. While serving, he earned a master's degree in strategic studies from the United States Army War College. From May 2005 to January 2007, Danner was deployed to Iraq as a Command Judge Advocate with the rank of colonel. He received the Legion of Merit, Bronze Star Medal, and Meritorious Service Medal for his military service.

His mother Pat Danner also served in the Missouri Senate and U.S. Congresswoman, whilst his wife Katie Steele Danner served in the Missouri House of Representatives from 1988 to 1994.

Party political offices
Preceded by Connie B. Hendren	Democratic nominee for State Auditor of Missouri; 1994	Succeeded by Claire McCaskill
