= Ike Skelton =

American politician (1931–2013)

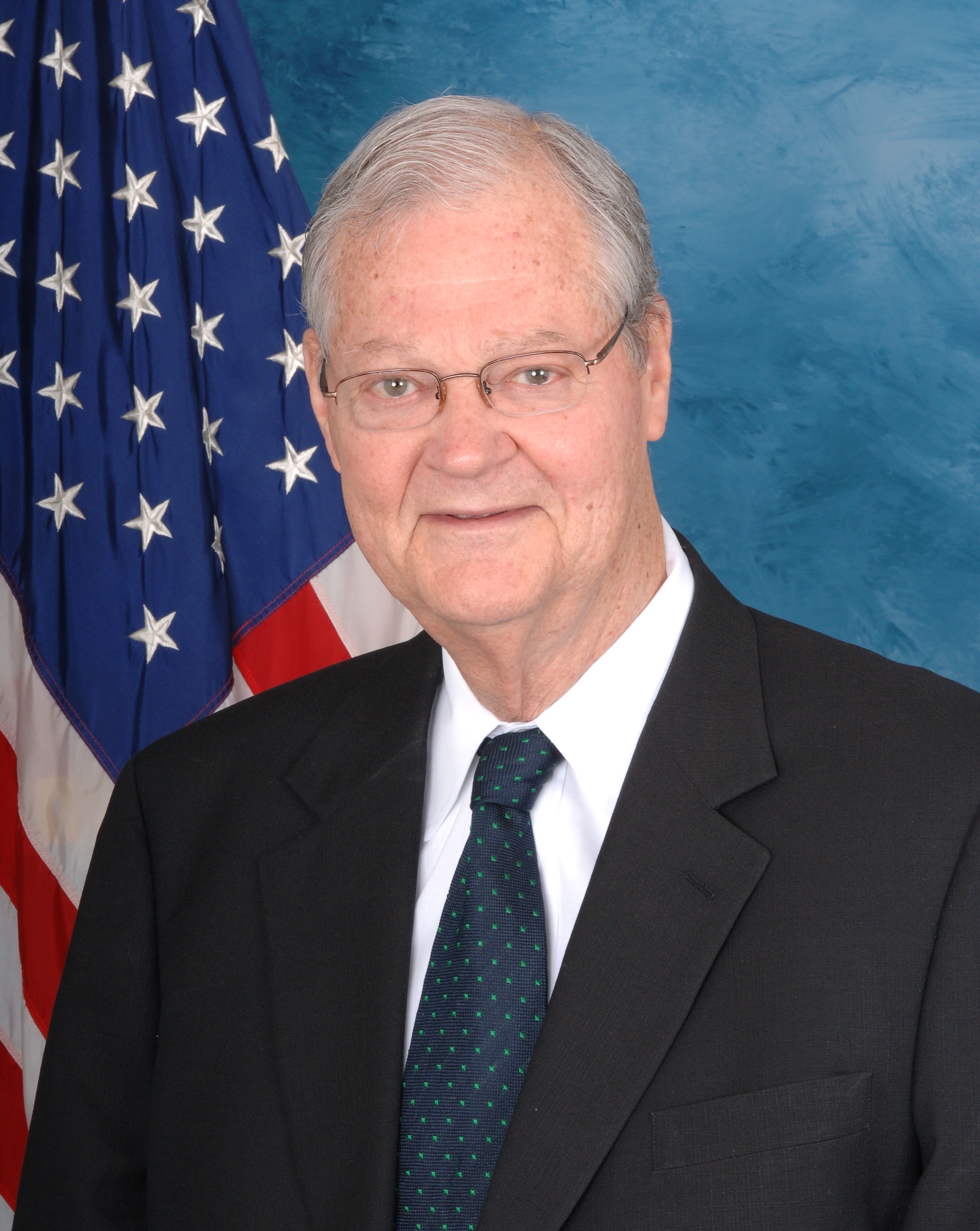

Chair of the House Armed Services Committee
- In office January 3, 2007 – January 3, 2011
- Preceded by: Duncan Hunter
- Succeeded by: Buck McKeon

Ranking Member of the House Armed Services Committee
- In office February 6, 1998 – January 3, 2007
- Preceded by: Ron Dellums
- Succeeded by: Duncan Hunter

Member of the U.S. House of Representatives from Missouri's 4th district
- In office January 3, 1977 – January 3, 2011
- Preceded by: William Randall
- Succeeded by: Vicky Hartzler

Member of the Missouri Senate from the 28th district
- In office 1971–1977
- Preceded by: John Ryan
- Succeeded by: David Doctorian

Personal details
- Born: Isaac Newton Skelton IV; December 20, 1931 Lexington, Missouri, U.S.
- Died: October 28, 2013 (aged 81) Arlington, Virginia, U.S.
- Party: Democratic
- Spouses: Susan Anding (m. 1961; died 2005) Patty Martin (m. 2009)
- Education: Wentworth Military Academy and College (AA); University of Missouri (AB, LLB)
- Ike Skelton's voice Ike Skelton explains his support for the 2002 AUMF Against Iraq; Recorded October 8, 2002

Isaac Newton Skelton IV (December 20, 1931 – October 28, 2013) was an American politician and lawyer who served as the U.S. representative for Missouri's 4th congressional district from 1977 to 2011. During his tenure, he served as the chairman of the House Armed Services Committee. He was a member of the Democratic Party. On November 2, 2010, he unexpectedly lost his seat to Republican Vicky Hartzler amid a Republican landslide. Notably, he was one of three Democratic committee chairmen to lose reelection in the 2010 midterm cycle, alongside House Budget Committee chairman John Spratt of South Carolina and House Transportation and Infrastructure Committee chairman Jim Oberstar of Minnesota.

== Early life and education ==
Skelton was born in Lexington, Missouri, a rural town with extensive Civil War history. He was the son of Carolyn Marie (Boone) and Isaac Newton Skelton III.

In 1928, Skelton's father met Harry S. Truman, then a Jackson County judge, and the men became good friends. When he was 17, Skelton attended Truman's 1949 inauguration.

Skelton was an Eagle Scout. He earned an associate of arts degree from Wentworth Military Academy and College in 1951, followed by an A.B. in 1953 and an LL.B. in 1956 from the University of Missouri. He is a brother of Sigma Chi and Alpha Phi Omega at the University of Missouri. He also attended the University of Edinburgh in Scotland in 1953.

== Career ==
Skelton became a lawyer and entered private practice in Lafayette County, Missouri. He was a prosecuting attorney from 1957 until 1960 and a special assistant attorney general in the office of the Missouri Attorney General.

Skelton served as a member of the Missouri Senate, representing Lafayette County, from 1971 until 1977.

== U.S. House of Representatives ==
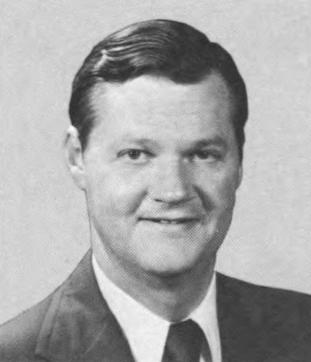
Inaugural Congressional photo of Skelton from the 1977 Congressional Pictorial Directory.

=== Committee assignments ===
- Committee on Armed Services (Chair)
  - As chairman of the full committee, Skelton was entitled to sit as an ex officio member of all subcommittees.

Skelton served as chair of the House Armed Services Committee, having previously served as ranking member on the House Armed Services Committee since 1998 but was promoted to chairman following the 2006 midterm elections when Democrats regained control of Congress.

== Political positions ==
Skelton voted with Democratic leadership 94.6% of the time during the 111th Congress, meaning he broke with his party more frequently than 82% of the Democratic Caucus. Vicky Hartzler, Skelton's 2010 Congressional opponent, stated on the campaign trail that Skelton has voted in line with House Speaker Nancy Pelosi 95% of the time during his tenure in the House.

Before the 2006 election, Skelton told columnist George Will that if the Democrats won control of Congress, his main priority would be "oversight, oversight, oversight!" While he voted for the War in Iraq, he expressed serious misgivings about troop readiness. In 2006, he favored reducing the number of troops in Iraq and supported redeploying a brigade from Iraq to Kuwait. Will suggested that under Skelton, the Armed Services Committee would resemble a U.S. Senate committee created to examine defense spending during World War II. This committee was chaired by Skelton's hero, Harry S. Truman.

=== Fiscal issues ===
Skelton voted against the 2001 Bush Tax cuts. In 1981, he voted against Reagan's tax cuts. He was supportive of labor. The League of Conservation Voters rated Skelton at 53 percent on environmental issues. He was one of the few Congressional Democrats to vote in favor of CAFTA and mostly supported free trade deals. He was a supporter of TRiO programs.

=== Social issues ===
Skelton was fairly conservative on social issues. He opposed abortion and gun control. He helped craft the Don't Ask, Don't Tell policy, and voted against its repeal in 2010.

=== Military issues ===
Skelton was a long-time proponent of the Missouri National Guard, in recognition for which the National Guard Training Center in Jefferson City is named in his honor. However, at times he has disagreed with other members of Missouri's congressional delegation over the state's defense installations. In 2005, for instance, he opposed Senator Kit Bond's efforts to keep open the 131st Air National Guard Fighter Wing in St. Louis County.

The wing was considered an "alert site" by the Defense Department, responsible for maintaining sovereignty over United States air space. In its final report, the 9/11 Commission found that the lack of alert sites, and with their positions primarily on the nation's periphery, reduced the capability of the military to respond effectively to the 9/11 attacks. Senator Bond testified in the Base Realignment and Closure (BRAC) hearings against the closure of the 131st, which was based at Lambert International Airport. He noted that this wing, which was located in a strategically important location, had protected critical assets on 09-11-01. He warned that the loss of the wing would compromise security over a vast area of the Midwestern United States. Representative Skelton, as the ranking Democrat on the House Armed Services Committee, voted in favor of closure. The House passed the BRAC recommendations, and the base was subsequently closed, with its components deployed elsewhere.

== Controversy ==
On October 8, 2009, Skelton, after addressing fellow Missouri Congressman Todd Akin, a Republican, on the House floor, said to Akin, "stick it up your ass." The comment was picked up by the microphone and could be heard on the C-SPAN broadcast. Skelton's spokeswoman, Jennifer Kohl, said the comment was not intended to be broadcast and was "said out of frustration in the heat of debate." Akin's spokesman, Steve Taylor, said the remark was "shocking and not characteristic of Skelton's behavior."

== Political campaigns ==
When William J. Randall retired after 17 years in the U.S. House of Representatives, Skelton won the Democratic nomination to succeed him with 40% of the vote in a crowded primary field of nine Democratic candidates. He ran with the endorsement of Truman's widow, Bess, which he attributes to his own father's support for Harry S. Truman in the 1940 U.S. Senate primary. He was reelected 16 times, usually by well over 60 percent of the vote. Before 2010, he only faced one truly serious challenge, in 1982. That year, Missouri lost a district, and Skelton's district was merged with the neighboring 8th District, represented by freshman Republican Wendell Bailey. Although Skelton retained almost 60 percent of his former territory, Bailey held him to 55 percent of the vote.

=== 2010 ===
Skelton seemed to have a fairly secure hold on his district, even though it had been trending Republican for some time. Historically, it had a character similar to Yellow Dog Democrat districts in the South. However, the rural areas of the district, once solidly Democratic, had swung hard to the GOP since the turn of the century. Indeed, in 2000, Republicans captured most of the area's legislative seats and have held them ever since. Even before then, the district had been shedding more of the strongly Democratic areas near Kansas City due to that city's dwindling population. As late as 1983, during Skelton's third term, the 4th stretched as far west as Independence on Kansas City's eastern border. As a result, it had been pushed further into heavily Republican Southwest Missouri. Al Gore, John Kerry and Barack Obama all won less than 40 percent of the vote in the district even as Skelton skated to reelection. It was considered very likely that Skelton would be succeeded by a Republican once he retired.

In 2010, Skelton faced former Republican state Representative Vicky Hartzler of Harrisonville, who had been out of politics for more than a decade. Polls consistently showed a very competitive race, easily the most competitive the district had seen in decades. Many pundits rated it as a toss-up.

It was still a surprise when Skelton lost to Hartzler, 50% to 45%. While Skelton ran evenly with Hartzler in the areas closer to Kansas City, he lost badly in the rural areas, including some that had supported him for many years. No Democrat has managed as much as 40 percent of the vote since Skelton left office.

== Awards and honors ==
In 2005 the U.S. Navy Memorial Foundation awarded Skelton its Naval Heritage award for his support of the U S Navy and military during his years in Congress. In 2010, Skelton was recognized by then, Commandant of the Marine Corps, General James F. Amos, as an Honorary Marine, the first U.S. congressman to be awarded the title. In 2012, the United States Military Academy recognized Skelton with the Sylvanus Thayer Award. In the same year, the USAF Air University presented Skelton with an honorary Doctor of Law degree for his work in the advancement of military education.

== Personal life ==
His wife of 44 years, Susan Anding Skelton, died on August 23, 2005. Later that year, on November 26, Skelton was injured when a van carrying him and fellow U.S. Representatives Tim Murphy and Jim Marshall overturned near Baghdad Airport while on an official visit to Iraq. Skelton and Murphy were airlifted to a U.S. Military hospital in Germany after complaining of neck pain. Both made a full recovery.

On August 29, 2009, Skelton married Patty Martin, a longtime friend and widowed middle school counselor from his home town.

Skelton was a member of the Christian Church and an honorary chieftain in Scouting's Tribe of Mic-O-Say. He was also of distant relation to Daniel Boone as well as to U.S. Representative Louise Slaughter of New York.

=== Death ===
Skelton died of pneumonia at Virginia Hospital Center in Arlington, Virginia on October 28, 2013, at the age of 81. According to Skelton's colleague, Russell Orban, Skelton had been admitted to the hospital a week earlier with a bad cough.

Skelton's memoir, Achieve the Honorable, had been published just two weeks before his death.

U.S. House of Representatives
Preceded by William J. Randall	Member of the U.S. House of Representatives from Missouri's 4th congressional district 1977–2011	Succeeded by Vicky Hartzler
Preceded by Ron Dellums	Ranking Member of the House Armed Services Committee; 1998–2007	Succeeded by Duncan Hunter
Preceded by Duncan Hunter	Chair of the House Armed Services Committee; 2007–2011	Succeeded by Howard McKeon
