= Pat Danner =

American politician (born 1934)

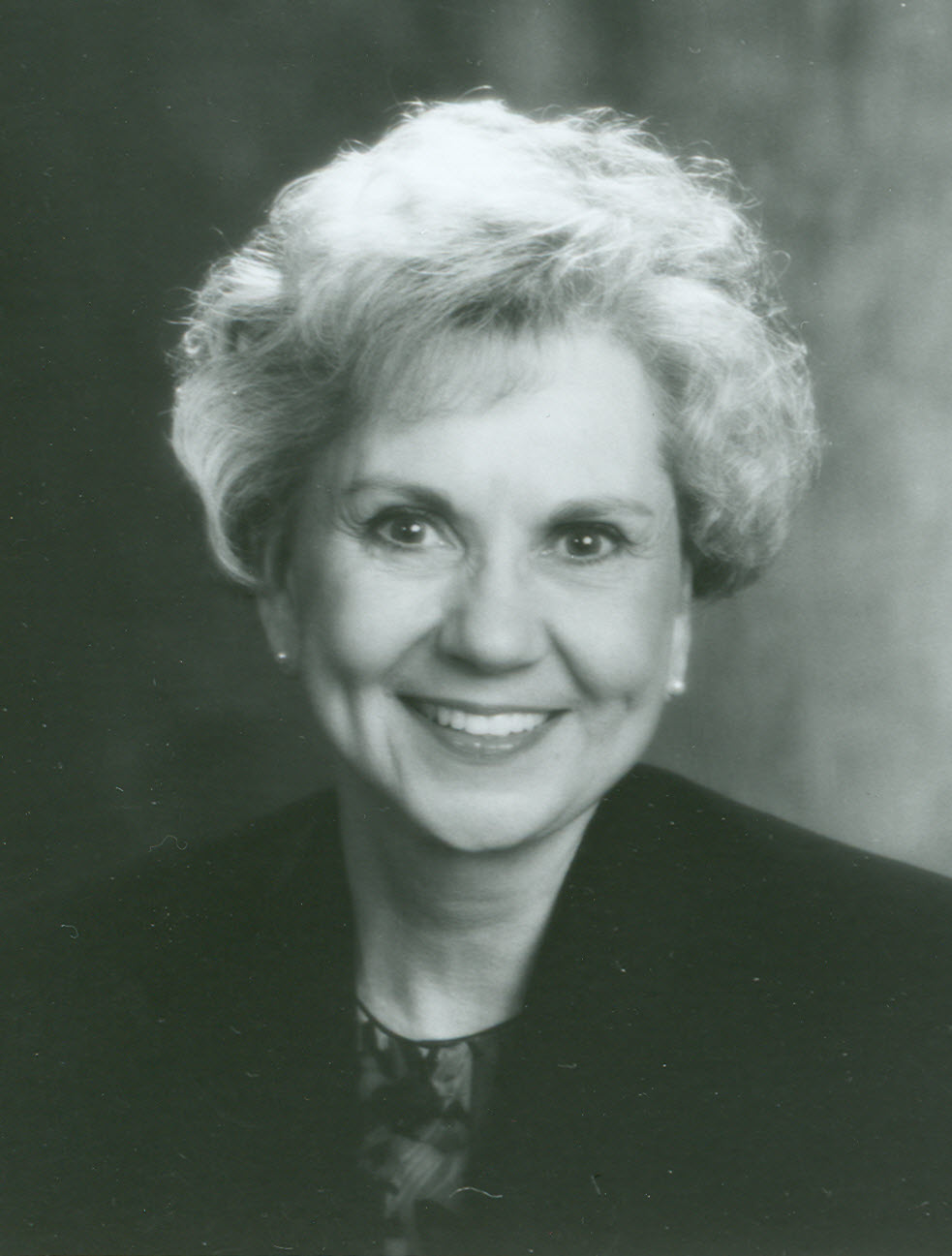

Member of the U.S. House of Representatives from Missouri's 6th district
- In office January 3, 1993 – January 3, 2001
- Preceded by: Tom Coleman
- Succeeded by: Sam Graves

Member of the Missouri Senate from the 12th district
- In office January 1983 – January 1993
- Preceded by: Hardin Cox
- Succeeded by: Glen Klippenstein

Personal details
- Born: Patsy Ann Berrer; January 13, 1934 (age 92) Louisville, Kentucky, U.S.
- Party: Democratic
- Spouse(s): Lavon Danner; Markt Meyer
- Children: Steve (son)
- Education: Truman State University (BA)

Patsy Ann Danner (née Berrer; born January 13, 1934) is an American politician. She formerly represented the Missouri's 6th congressional district in the United States House of Representatives as a Democrat.

== Education and background ==
Danner grew up in Bevier, Missouri; her maternal grandparents emigrated from Lebanon in the first decade of the 20th century. She attended public schools and graduated from Northwest Missouri State University cum laude with a BA in political science. Following graduation, Danner worked as district administrator to Congressman Jerry Litton. She was appointed to a sub-cabinet position in the Carter administration.

== Political career ==
Congressman Litton vacated his seat to run for the United States Senate in 1976, and Danner filed in the race to replace him. Danner was defeated in the August 1976, Democratic primary by Morgan Maxfield, who was himself defeated in November by Republican state Representative Tom Coleman. In 1982, Danner was elected to the Missouri Senate, and was re-elected in 1986 and 1990. In 1992, Danner successfully ran for Congress, defeating the incumbent Coleman in an upset. Danner was re-elected to the House in 1994, 1996, and 1998.

In 2000, Danner announced that she would not seek re-election because she was undergoing treatment for breast cancer. Her son, Steve Danner, a former state senator, filed to replace her and was defeated by Sam Graves, 51% to 47%.

== See also ==
- List of Arab and Middle-Eastern Americans in the United States Congress
- Women in the United States House of Representatives

U.S. House of Representatives
Preceded by Tom Coleman	Member of the U.S. House of Representatives from Missouri's 6th congressional district 1993–2001	Succeeded by Sam Graves
U.S. order of precedence (ceremonial)
Preceded by James W. Symington as Former U.S. Representative	Order of precedence of the United States as Former U.S. Representative	Succeeded by Russ Carnahan as Former U.S. Representative
