= Morris Westfall =

American politician

Morris Westfall (born April 5, 1939) is a former American Republican politician who has served in the Missouri General Assembly in the Missouri Senate and the Missouri House of Representatives.

Westfall graduated from University of Missouri with a bachelor's degree in agriculture. He has served in the U.S. Marine Corps and has worked as a livestock farmer. As chairman of the Senate Transportation Committee, Westfall has been an advocate for road safety and against drunk driving.
