= List of Missouri state high school baseball champions =

Missouri high school baseball champions since 1950

Below is a list of Missouri state high school baseball championships sanctioned by the Missouri State High School Activities Association since the organization began holding the tournaments in 1950. More recently, championships have been held at Meador Park in Springfield to 2012, and CarShield Field (formerly T.R. Hughes Ballpark) in O'Fallon from 2013. Since 2021, they are played at U.S. Baseball Park in Ozark, Missouri, renamed as the Ozark Mountain Sports Complex in 2024.

== Championships ==
Year	Class	Champion (record)	Score	Runner-up	Site	Ref
1950	—	Central (St. Louis)	2–1 (8)	St. Mary's (St. Louis)	Sportsman's Park, St. Louis	
1951	—	Central (St. Louis)	13–0	Sikeston	Sportsman's Park, St. Louis	
1952	—	Central (St. Louis)	3–0	Central (Cape Girardeau)	Sportsman's Park, St. Louis	
1953	—	Normandy (19-4)	2–1	McBride (St. Louis)	Sportsman's Park, St. Louis	
1954	—	Central (Cape Girardeau) (15–0)	5–4	Lutheran (St. Louis)	Sportsman's Park, St. Louis	
1955	—	Joplin (15–1)	5–2	McKinley	Sportsman's Park, St. Louis	
1956	—	Beaumont (21–1)	2–1	St. Mary's (St. Louis)	Cherokee Park, St. Louis	
1957	—	Ritenour (20–2)	4–0	St. Francis Borgia	Fairground Park, St. Louis	
1958	—	Cleveland (St. Louis) (23–1)	12–0	University City	Sportsman's Park, St. Louis	
1959	—	Joplin (20–2)	1–0	Ferguson	Sportsman's Park, St. Louis	
1960	—	Beaumont (16–5)	4–2	Ladue Horton Watkins	Sportsman's Park, St. Louis	
1961	—	Kirkwood (19–4)	3–0	Ferguson	Sportsman's Park, St. Louis	
1962	—	Central (Cape Girardeau) (21–0)	4–2	St. Louis Univ. High	Sportsman's Park, St. Louis	
1963	—	University City (22–3)	6–3	Central (Cape Girardeau)	Fairground Park, St. Louis	
1964	—	McBride (St. Louis)	4–2	Central (Springfield)	Sportsman's Park, St. Louis	
1965	—	Crystal City (14–6)	6–4	Southwest (St. Louis)	Sportsman's Park, St. Louis	
1966	—	Ritenour (20–1)	2–0	Augustinian Academy (St. Louis)	Heine Meine Field, Lemay	
1967	—	Ritenour (20–5)	8–2	Hickman	Heine Meine Field, Lemay	
1968	—	Oak Park (21–7)	8–7	West Plains	Meador Park, Springfield	
1969	—	Oak Park (19–8)	5–1	Lafayette (Wildwood)	Meador Park, Springfield	
1970	—	Lafayette (Wildwood) (18–6)	3–2	McCluer	Meador Park, Springfield	
1971	—	Lafayette (Wildwood) (21–3)	4–2	Memorial (Joplin)	Meador Park, Springfield	
1972	—	Lafayette (Wildwood) (22–3)	6–3	Lee's Summit	Heine Meine Field, Lemay	
1973	A	Pembroke Country Day (16–9)	9–4	Scott City	Meador Park, Springfield	
1973	AA	Fox (13–5)	1–0	Chaminade	Heine Meine Field, Lemay	
1974	A	Pembroke Country Day (13–1)	1–0	Nixa	Whiteley Park, Poplar Bluff	
1974	AA	Hazelwood (20–6)	4–0	Fox	3&2 Stadium, Kansas City	
1975	A	Chaffee (13–5)	7–2 (6)	St. Francis Borgia	City Park, Washington	
1975	AA	Fox (14–6)	8–5	Raytown South	Meador Park, Springfield	
1976	A	Dixon (19–0)	11–2	Lilbourn	Sports Complex, Flat River	
1976	AA	Glendale (21–2)	7–5	Jennings	Sports Complex, Flat River	
1977	A	Chaffee (20–7)	8–1	Dixon	Lebanon High Field, Lebanon	
1977	AA	Truman (23–3)	6–3	Lindbergh	Heine Meine Field, Lemay	
1978	A	Brentwood (15–8)	12–10 (8)	Scott City	Simmons Field, UMC, Columbia	
1978	AA	Glendale (19–4)	6–3	Fox	Simmons Field, UMC, Columbia	
1979	A	Smithville (14–2)	15–1 (5)	Ozark	Simmons Field, UMC, Columbia	
1979	AA	Hillcrest (24–1)	2–1	Hazelwood Central	Simmons Field, UMC, Columbia	
1980	1A	Sturgeon (12–1)	14–0	Humansville	Simmons Field, UMC, Columbia	
1980	2A–3A	Winfield (16–3)	2–1	Bismarck	Simmons Field, UMC, Columbia	
1980	4A	Winnetonka (19–5)	5–4 (10)	Central (Cape Girardeau)	Simmons Field, UMC, Columbia	
1981	1A	Englewood Christian (15–7)	4–3	Laquey	Simmons Field, UMC, Columbia	
1981	2A–3A	Maryville (14–4)	9–7	Ozark	Simmons Field, UMC, Columbia	
1981	4A	Hazelwood Central (12–7)	8–5	Lindbergh	Simmons Field, UMC, Columbia	
1982	1A	Sturgeon (14–2)	6–0	Englewood Christian	Simmons Field, UMC, Columbia	
1982	2A–3A	Central (Park Hills) (20–3)	7–1	Clayton	Simmons Field, UMC, Columbia	
1982	4A	Hazelwood Central (19–6)	3–2	Mehlville	Simmons Field, UMC, Columbia	
1983	1A	Chaffee (16–5)	6–2	Englewood Christian	Simmons Field, UMC, Columbia	
1983	2A	Notre Dame (Cape Girardeau) (17–3)	7–0	Licking	Simmons Field, UMC, Columbia	
1983	3A	Farmington (21–4)	7–6	Duchesne	Simmons Field, UMC, Columbia	
1983	4A	Oak Park (20–2)	13–6	Mehlville	Simmons Field, UMC, Columbia	
1984	1A	Englewood Christian (21–2)	18–3 (5)	Holcomb	Simmons Field, UMC, Columbia	
1984	2A	Notre Dame (Cape Girardeau) (13–5)	11–4	Mansfield	Simmons Field, UMC, Columbia	
1984	3A	Duchesne (14–4)	5–4	Sullivan	Simmons Field, UMC, Columbia	
1984	4A	Parkwood (Joplin) (22–2)	7–3	Mehlville	Simmons Field, UMC, Columbia	
1985	1A	Galena (17–5)	10–3	Valley Park	Simmons Field, UMC, Columbia	
1985	2A	John Burroughs (19–4)	5–3	Licking	Simmons Field, UMC, Columbia	
1985	3A	Raymore-Peculiar (18–6)	4–0	Farmington	Simmons Field, UMC, Columbia	
1985	4A	Winnetonka (23–4)	14–11	Kickapoo	Simmons Field, UMC, Columbia	
1986	1A	New Bloomfield (17–5)	7–1	Marion C. Early	Simmons Field, UMC, Columbia	
1986	2A	Brentwood (22–4)	6–1	Westran	Simmons Field, UMC, Columbia	
1986	3A	Herculaneum (21–4–1)	8–4	Affton	Simmons Field, UMC, Columbia	
1986	4A	Pattonville (25–1)	2–1 (11)	Winnetonka	Simmons Field, UMC, Columbia	
1987	1A	New Haven (17–6)	14–0 (5)	New Franklin	Simmons Field, UMC, Columbia	
1987	2A	Hallsville (17–4)	4–1	Eugene	Simmons Field, UMC, Columbia	
1987	3A	Helias (22–5)	7–3	Dexter	Simmons Field, UMC, Columbia	
1987	4A	Oak Park (24–2)	9–8	Lafayette (Wildwood)	Simmons Field, UMC, Columbia	
1988	1A	Valley Park (16–9)	4–3	Canton	Simmons Field, UMC, Columbia	
1988	2A	Licking (18–5)	8–5	Salisbury	Simmons Field, UMC, Columbia	
1988	3A	Helias (24–0)	11–2	St. Dominic	Simmons Field, UMC, Columbia	
1988	4A	Hillcrest (20–5)	3–2	Blue Springs	Simmons Field, UMC, Columbia	
1989	1A	New Bloomfield (18–6)	18–6	Southland	Simmons Field, UMC, Columbia	
1989	2A	Licking (16–3)	3–1	Neelyville	Simmons Field, UMC, Columbia	
1989	3A	Helias (21–2)	13–3 (5)	Branson	Simmons Field, UMC, Columbia	
1989	4A	Jefferson City (21–2)	10–3	Oakville	Simmons Field, UMC, Columbia	
1990	1A	Billings (21–0)	8–7	Holcomb	Simmons Field, UMC, Columbia	
1990	2A	Principia (15–9)	10–5	Westran	Simmons Field, UMC, Columbia	
1990	3A	Fulton (20–4)	11–1 (5)	Festus	Simmons Field, UMC, Columbia	
1990	4A	Hickman (17–6)	4–0	Parkway West	Simmons Field, UMC, Columbia	
1991	1A	New Bloomfield (18–5)	3–2 (8)	Holcomb	Simmons Field, UMC, Columbia	
1991	2A	St. Pius X (Kansas City) (20–3)	9–5	Mansfield	Simmons Field, UMC, Columbia	
1991	3A	John Burroughs (19–3)	12–1 (6)	Central (Park Hills)	Simmons Field, UMC, Columbia	
1991	4A	Fort Osage (23–2–1)	10–4	Francis Howell	Simmons Field, UMC, Columbia	
1992	1A	New Bloomfield (19–6)	5–4	Crane	Simmons Field, UMC, Columbia	
1992	2A	Fatima (23–1)	7–0	Ash Grove	Simmons Field, UMC, Columbia	
1992	3A	Oak Grove (23-2)	5–2	Branson	Simmons Field, UMC, Columbia	
1992	4A	Chaminade (26-0-1)	7–4	Parkway Central	Simmons Field, UMC, Columbia	
1993	1A	New Bloomfield (16–6)	2–1	Crane	Simmons Field, UMC, Columbia	
1993	2A	Notre Dame (Cape Girardeau) (16–7)	3–1	Mansfield	Simmons Field, UMC, Columbia	
1993	3A	Hancock (16–3)	5–4	Helias	Simmons Field, UMC, Columbia	
1993	4A	Oak Park (22–0)	7–4	Parkway Central	Simmons Field, UMC, Columbia	
1994	1A	Whitfield (21–5–1)	7–6 (9)	Billings	Simmons Field, UMC, Columbia	
1994	2A	Senath-Hornersville (20–4)	3–0	Licking	Simmons Field, UMC, Columbia	
1994	3A	Potosi (21–4)	10–0 (6)	Sullivan	Simmons Field, UMC, Columbia	
1994	4A	Central (Cape Girardeau) (23–4)	8–1	Joplin	Simmons Field, UMC, Columbia	
1995	1A	St. Elizabeth (15–4)	20–2 (6)	North Pemiscot	Simmons Field, UMC, Columbia	
1995	2A	Mansfield (19–7)	2–1	Fatima	Simmons Field, UMC, Columbia	
1995	3A	Kirksville (19–1)	19–0	Herculaneum	Simmons Field, UMC, Columbia	
1995	4A	Oak Park (17–4)	6–2	Joplin	Simmons Field, UMC, Columbia	
1996	1A	New Bloomfield (16–7)	6–2	North Pemiscot	Simmons Field, UMC, Columbia	
1996	2A	Mansfield (23–4)	2–0	Principia	Simmons Field, UMC, Columbia	
1996	3A	Potosi (21–4)	5–4	Helias	Simmons Field, UMC, Columbia	
1996	4A	Parkway West (24–2)	14–3 (5)	Fort Zumwalt South	Simmons Field, UMC, Columbia	
1997	1A	St. Elizabeth (27–0)	9–0	New Bloomfield	Simmons Field, UMC, Columbia	
1997	2A	Springfield Catholic (22–8)	—	(historically vacant; forfeit)	Simmons Field, UMC, Columbia	
1997	3A	North County (25–2)	13–2	Webb City	Simmons Field, UMC, Columbia	
1997	4A	Fort Osage (21–7)	5–4	Francis Howell	Simmons Field, UMC, Columbia	
1998	1A	Halfway (23–2)	9–3	Oran	Simmons Field, UMC, Columbia	
1998	2A	St. Pius X (Kansas City) (20–6)	15–2	Springfield Catholic	Simmons Field, UMC, Columbia	
1998	3A	Kearney (25–5)	14–0	Marshfield	Simmons Field, UMC, Columbia	
1998	4A	Chaminade (25–3)	5–0	De Smet	Simmons Field, UMC, Columbia	
1999	1A	Bevier (13–3)	5–3	Marion C. Early	Simmons Field, UMC, Columbia	
1999	2A	St. Pius X (Kansas City) (17–5)	13–7	Notre Dame (Cape Girardeau)	Simmons Field, UMC, Columbia	
1999	3A	Herculaneum (24–3)	4–1	Branson	Simmons Field, UMC, Columbia	
1999	4A	Blue Springs (28–2)	13–6	Parkway South	Simmons Field, UMC, Columbia	
2000	1A	St. Vincent (16–13)	9–0	North Shelby	Taylor Stadium, UMC, Columbia	
2000	2A	Crystal City (13–14)	15–11	St. Pius X (Kansas City)	Taylor Stadium, UMC, Columbia	
2000	3A	Helias (25–2)	6–1	Carl Junction	Taylor Stadium, UMC, Columbia	
2000	4A	De Smet (23–4–1)	9–3	Lafayette (Wildwood)	Taylor Stadium, UMC, Columbia	
2001	1A	Jasper (22–2)	5–4	St. Vincent	Taylor Stadium, UMC, Columbia	
2001	2A	Iberia (24–2)	10–0 (6)	Clearwater	Taylor Stadium, UMC, Columbia	
2001	3A	Helias (22–7)	13–3 (6)	Sikeston	Taylor Stadium, UMC, Columbia	
2001	4A	Joplin (22–10)	2–0	Francis Howell North	Taylor Stadium, UMC, Columbia	
2002	1A	Marion C. Early (20–5)	5–4 (8)	New Haven	Taylor Stadium, UMC, Columbia	
2002	2A	John Burroughs (24–3)	9–3	St. Pius X (Kansas City)	Taylor Stadium, UMC, Columbia	
2002	3A	Platte County (24–3)	19–1 (5)	St. Mary's (St. Louis)	Taylor Stadium, UMC, Columbia	
2002	4A	Liberty (23–8)	6–5 (9)	Francis Howell North	Taylor Stadium, UMC, Columbia	
2003	1	Sparta (21–1)	5–2	Oran	Taylor Stadium, UMC, Columbia	
2003	2	Valley Park (23–4)	3–2	Clearwater	Taylor Stadium, UMC, Columbia	
2003	3	North County (28–3)	2–0	Willard	Taylor Stadium, UMC, Columbia	
2003	4	Francis Howell (25–6)	8–7	Joplin	Taylor Stadium, UMC, Columbia	
2004	1	Archie (18–4)	4–3	Oran	Taylor Stadium, UMC, Columbia	
2004	2	Hallsville (23–2)	11–4	Springfield Catholic	Taylor Stadium, UMC, Columbia	
2004	3	Ozark (29–4)	8–2	MICDS	Taylor Stadium, UMC, Columbia	
2004	4	Vianney (22–7)	9–6	Rockhurst	Taylor Stadium, UMC, Columbia	
2005	1	Plato (23–3)	1–0	Archie	Taylor Stadium, UMC, Columbia	
2005	2	Hallsville (24–5)	8–7	Mansfield	Taylor Stadium, UMC, Columbia	
2005	3	Webb City (24–4)	9–1	St. Charles	Taylor Stadium, UMC, Columbia	
2005	4	Hickman (28–2)	17–7	De Smet	Taylor Stadium, UMC, Columbia	
2006	1	Sacred Heart (22–2)	11–4	Stoutland	Taylor Stadium, UMC, Columbia	
2006	2	Blair Oaks (21–2)	4–2	South Pemiscot	Taylor Stadium, UMC, Columbia	
2006	3	Webb City (22–4)	6–5	Lee's Summit West	Taylor Stadium, UMC, Columbia	
2006	4	Vianney (24–3)	3–1 (8)	Hazelwood Central	Taylor Stadium, UMC, Columbia	
2007	1	New Haven (16–5)	5–4	Stoutland	Meador Park, Springfield	
2007	2	Blair Oaks (22–0)	13–10	Houston	Meador Park, Springfield	
2007	3	Benton (St. Joseph) (24–3)	2–0	Sullivan	Meador Park, Springfield	
2007	4	Blue Springs (25–2)	11–3	Holt	Meador Park, Springfield	
2008	1	Santa Fe (18–1)	12–7	Stoutland	Meador Park, Springfield	
2008	2	Scott City (16–10)	13–3	Barstow	Meador Park, Springfield	
2008	3	St. Dominic (21–8)	8–0	Webb City	Meador Park, Springfield	
2008	4	Ozark (20–3)	3–2	Francis Howell	Meador Park, Springfield	
2009	1	Dora (20–4)	8–5	Santa Fe	Meador Park, Springfield	
2009	2	Valle Catholic (22–5)	6–2	Strafford	Meador Park, Springfield	
2009	3	Notre Dame (Cape Girardeau) (28–2)	18–4	Carl Junction	Meador Park, Springfield	
2009	4	Fort Zumwalt South (27–7)	8–4	Lee's Summit North	Meador Park, Springfield	
2010	1	Concordia (18–3)	6–1	Brashear	Meador Park, Springfield	
2010	2	Crystal City (20–5)	10–1	Carrollton	Meador Park, Springfield	
2010	3	Bishop DuBourg (24–4)	8–5	Winfield	Meador Park, Springfield	
2010	4	Christian Brothers College (25–7)	14–4	Webb City	Meador Park, Springfield	
2011	1	La Plata (20–2)	7–6	Liberal	Meador Park, Springfield	
2011	2	New Bloomfield (18–4)	20–4	Summit Christian	Meador Park, Springfield	
2011	3	Westminster Christian (26–4–1)	6–3	Savannah	Meador Park, Springfield	
2011	4	Francis Howell (31–3)	10–5	Liberty	Meador Park, Springfield	
2012	1	Santa Fe (22–1)	12–3	Norwood	Meador Park, Springfield	
2012	2	South Callaway (23–4)	4–3	Valle Catholic	Meador Park, Springfield	
2012	3	Westminster Christian (28–3)	10–4	Lutheran South	Meador Park, Springfield	
2012	4	Rockwood Summit (18–9)	4–3	Parkway North	Meador Park, Springfield	
2013	1	Oran (21–5)	8–4	Santa Fe	T.R. Hughes Ballpark, O'Fallon	
2013	2	Hartville (17–4)	4–3	West Platte	T.R. Hughes Ballpark, O'Fallon	
2013	3	Fatima (22–5)	2–0 (8)	Springfield Catholic	T.R. Hughes Ballpark, O'Fallon	
2013	4	Westminster Christian (32–3)	2–1	Oak Grove	T.R. Hughes Ballpark, O'Fallon	
2013	5	Francis Howell (32–5)	7–3	Christian Brothers College	T.R. Hughes Ballpark, O'Fallon	
2014	1	Cooter (19–12)	1–0	Northeast (Cairo)	T.R. Hughes Ballpark, O'Fallon	
2014	2	Valle Catholic (29–3)	13–2	Hartville	T.R. Hughes Ballpark, O'Fallon	
2014	3	Springfield Catholic (27–2)	8–3	Christian	T.R. Hughes Ballpark, O'Fallon	
2014	4	Westminster Christian (30–5)	5–0	Pembroke Hill	T.R. Hughes Ballpark, O'Fallon	
2014	5	Rock Bridge with Columbia Independent (23–12)	9–6	Francis Howell	T.R. Hughes Ballpark, O'Fallon	
2015	1	Bell City (24–3)	6–3	Atlanta	T.R. Hughes Ballpark, O'Fallon	
2015	2	Valle Catholic (29–5)	7–1	New Bloomfield	T.R. Hughes Ballpark, O'Fallon	
2015	3	Fatima (21–7)	3–2 (8)	Scott City	T.R. Hughes Ballpark, O'Fallon	
2015	4	Notre Dame (Cape Girardeau) (27–5)	17–0	Sullivan	T.R. Hughes Ballpark, O'Fallon	
2015	5	Christian Brothers College (31–6)	17–5	Staley	T.R. Hughes Ballpark, O'Fallon	
2016	1	Bell City (23–3)	7–2	New Covenant with The Summit Preparatory	CarShield Field, O'Fallon	
2016	2	Valle Catholic (33–2)	15–2	Canton	CarShield Field, O'Fallon	
2016	3	Mountain Grove (25–5)	4–1	Summit Christian	CarShield Field, O'Fallon	
2016	4	MICDS (20–7)	7–3	Boonville	CarShield Field, O'Fallon	
2016	5	Francis Howell (28–11)	8–2	Jefferson City	CarShield Field, O'Fallon	
2017	1	Bell City (20–6)	10–0	Wellsville	CarShield Field, O'Fallon	
2017	2	Mansfield (20–2)	16–3	Canton	CarShield Field, O'Fallon	
2017	3	South Callaway (27–5)	4–0	Valley Park	CarShield Field, O'Fallon	
2017	4	Aurora (26–3)	5–3	Lutheran South	CarShield Field, O'Fallon	
2017	5	Jefferson City (30–2)	2–1 (8)	Fort Zumwalt West	CarShield Field, O'Fallon	
2018	1	Oran (17–9)	4–1	St. Elizabeth	CarShield Field, O'Fallon	
2018	2	Valle Catholic (24–9)	12–5	Mansfield	CarShield Field, O'Fallon	
2018	3	Malden (25–5)	9–8	Strafford	CarShield Field, O'Fallon	
2018	4	Aurora (30–1)	2–0	St. Mary's (St. Louis)	CarShield Field, O'Fallon	
2018	5	Vianney (36–2)	8–2	Hickman	CarShield Field, O'Fallon	
2019	1	St. Elizabeth (17–4)	2–1	La Plata	CarShield Field, O'Fallon	
2019	2	Ellington (28–1)	9–0	Seymour	CarShield Field, O'Fallon	
2019	3	Blair Oaks (22–11)	1–0	Fatima	CarShield Field, O'Fallon	
2019	4	St. Francis Borgia (22–7)	13–1	Westminster Christian	CarShield Field, O'Fallon	
2019	5	De Smet (13–13–1)	6–4	Marquette	CarShield Field, O'Fallon	
2020	1–5	N/A (cancelled)	N/A	N/A	CarShield Field, O'Fallon	
2021	1	Oran (24–4)	3–0	St. Elizabeth	U.S. Baseball Park, Ozark	
2021	2	Marionville (23–6)	8–7	East Buchanon	U.S. Baseball Park, Ozark	
2021	3	St. Pius X (Kansas City) (23–3)	10–5	Linn	U.S. Baseball Park, Ozark	
2021	4	Kennett (26–8)	16–5	Blair Oaks	U.S. Baseball Park, Ozark	
2021	5	Willard (26–8)	27–10	Grain Valley	U.S. Baseball Park, Ozark	
2021	6	Liberty (32–9)	8–4	Fort Zumwalt West	U.S. Baseball Park, Ozark	
2022	1	St. Elizabeth (18–6)	9–2	Oran	U.S. Baseball Park, Ozark	
2022	2	Russellville (29–4)	5–3	Portageville	U.S. Baseball Park, Ozark	
2022	3	Father Tolton Regional Catholic (18–3)	8–4	Springfield Catholic	U.S. Baseball Park, Ozark	
2022	4	Southern Boone (34–2)	8–3	Logan-Rogersville	U.S. Baseball Park, Ozark	
2022	5	Platte County (27–8)	6–1	Festus	U.S. Baseball Park, Ozark	
2022	6	Liberty North (33–9)	11–5	Blue Springs South	U.S. Baseball Park, Ozark	
2023	1	St. Elizabeth (23–7)	13–3	South Nodaway/Jefferson	U.S. Baseball Park, Ozark	
2023	2	Ash Grove (25–0)	13–3	Salisbury	U.S. Baseball Park, Ozark	
2023	3	Licking (27–6)	3–1	South Callaway	U.S. Baseball Park, Ozark	
2023	4	John Burroughs (28–3)	9–4	Springfield Catholic	U.S. Baseball Park, Ozark	
2023	5	Festus (28–3)	8–1	St. Francis Borgia	U.S. Baseball Park, Ozark	
2023	6	Liberty North (34–7)	9–3	Francis Howell	U.S. Baseball Park, Ozark	
2024	1	Oran (20–5)	11–1	Sacred Heart	Ozark Mountain Sports Complex, Ozark	
2024	2	Iberia (28–0)	7–3	Maysville	Ozark Mountain Sports Complex, Ozark	
2024	3	Duchesne (25–10)	9–0	Mid-Buchanan	Ozark Mountain Sports Complex, Ozark	
2024	4	Blair Oaks (26–13)	7–2	Benton (St. Joseph)	Ozark Mountain Sports Complex, Ozark	
2024	5	Willard (34–5)	5–1	Webster Groves	Ozark Mountain Sports Complex, Ozark	
2024	6	Blue Springs (28–11)	11–10	Lafayette (Wildwood)	Ozark Mountain Sports Complex, Ozark	
2025	1	St. Elizabeth (25–7)	5–2	Faith Christian	Ozark Mountain Sports Complex, Ozark	
2025	2	Miller (25–5)	7–1	Eugene	Ozark Mountain Sports Complex, Ozark	
2025	3	Fatima (20–13)	2–0	Fair Grove	Ozark Mountain Sports Complex, Ozark	
2025	4	Chillicothe (23–12)	9–7	Logan-Rogersville	Ozark Mountain Sports Complex, Ozark	
2025	5	Platte County (29–8)	14–4	Vianney	Ozark Mountain Sports Complex, Ozark	
2025	6	Blue Springs South (27–7)	8–6	Staley	Ozark Mountain Sports Complex, Ozark	
2026	1	Northland Christian (32–8)	10–0	St. Elizabeth	Ozark Mountain Sports Complex, Ozark	
2026	2	Faith Christian (30–5)	5–4	Portageville	Ozark Mountain Sports Complex, Ozark	
2026	3	Blair Oaks (21–10)	11–1	Duchesne	Ozark Mountain Sports Complex, Ozark	
2026	4	Excelsior Springs (29–7)	2–0	Orchard Farm	Ozark Mountain Sports Complex, Ozark	
2026	5	Willard (34–8)	9–8	St. Dominic	Ozark Mountain Sports Complex, Ozark	
2026	6	Blue Springs South (28–10)	10–5	Christian Brothers College	Ozark Mountain Sports Complex, Ozark	

== See also ==
- List of Missouri state high school football champions
- List of Missouri state high school boys basketball championships
- List of Missouri state high school girls basketball championships
- List of Missouri state high school girls volleyball championships
- List of Missouri high schools by athletic conferences
