= List of Missouri state high school girls basketball championships =

Below is a list of Missouri state high school girls' basketball championships sanctioned by the Missouri State High School Activities Association since the organization began holding the tournaments in 1973. Girls' basketball in Missouri started as early as the 1920s, but was played by schools mostly in the rural areas north of current U.S. Route 36. Few, if any, schools in the larger metro areas or central and southern Missouri schools offered organized basketball for girls until many decades later. A series of regional tournaments were held in Monroe City, Missouri from 1927 to 1933. Considering the lack of girls' basketball elsewhere, these regional tournament winners could be considered state champions de facto, if not de jure. A state-sanctioned tournament was held during the 1939–40 and 1940-41 seasons in Clarence. However, the advent of World War II and gas rationing caused their discontinuation. Regional girls' basketball tournaments did not resume in Missouri until 1972.

== Championships ==
| Year | Class | Champion | Record | Head coach | Score | Runner-up | Third place | Score | Fourth place | Venue |
|---|---|---|---|---|---|---|---|---|---|---|
| 1973 | — | Northeast Nodaway | 31-0 | Claude Samson | 41-35 | South Shelby | Wheeling | 43-30 | Cass-Midway | Lamkin Gymnasium, NWMSU, Maryville |
| 1974 | — | South Shelby | 30-0 | Greg Pohlman | 42-40 | Wheeling | Northeast Nodaway | 40-24 | Bronaugh | Lamkin Gymnasium, NWMSU, Maryville |
| 1975 | A | Wheeling | 32-0 | Dick Halterman | 55-46 (OT) | Northeast Nodaway | Bronaugh | 53-41 | Southwest (Washburn) | Pershing Arena, NMSU, Kirksville |
| 1975 | AA | St. Joseph's Academy (St. Louis) | 25-0 | Kathy Boles | 54-28 | Marceline | South Shelby | 53-47 | Kickapoo (Springfield) | Peshing Arena, NMSU, Kirksville |
| 1976 | A | Northeast Nodaway | 30-1 | Claude Samson | 38-31 | Hale | Bronaugh | 45-41 | Belle | Pershing Arena, NMSU, Kirksville |
| 1976 | AA | Knox County | 27-3 | Carol Gross | 51-38 | St. Mary's (Independence) | Rosati-Kain (St. Louis) | 37-30 | Kickapoo (Springfield) | Pershing Arena, NMSU, Kirksville |
| 1977 | 1A | Northeast Nodaway | 32-0 | Claude Samson | 41-17 | Belle | Wheeling | 68-51 | Harrisburg | Multipurpose Fieldhouse, CMSU, Warrensburg |
| 1977 | 2A | Penney | 29-0 | Herb Webster | 40-37 | Canton | Catholic (Springfield) | 50-38 | Kelly | Multipurpose Fieldhouse, CMSU, Warrensburg |
| 1977 | 3A | Hickman Mills (Kansas City) | 29-1 | Clyde Cozad | 40-34 | Bishop Dubourg (St. Louis) | Lindbergh (St. Louis) | 60-41 | Highland | Multipurpose Fieldhouse, CMSU, Warrensburg |
| 1978 | 1A | Northeast Nodaway | 32-0 | Claude Sampson | 41-32 | Wheaton | North Shelby | 46-36 | Catholic (Springfield) | Multipurpose Fieldhouse, CMSU, Warrensburg |
| 1978 | 2A | Visitation Academy (St. Louis) | 30-0 | Thad Strobach | 53-43 | Kelly | Penney | 54-23 | Reeds Spring | Multipurpose Fieldhouse, CMSU, Warrensburg |
| 1978 | 3A | Lee's Summit | 29-2 | Larry Jansen | 53-38 | St. Joseph's Academy (St. Louis) | Boonville | 48-30 | Bishop Dubourg (St. Louis) | Mark Twain Building, UMSL, St. Louis |
| 1979 | 1A | Northeast Nodaway | 30-3 | Claude Samson | 52-27 | Greenwood | Wheeling | 51-46 | Wheaton | Pershing Arena, NMSU, Kirksville |
| 1979 | 2A | Visitation Academy (St. Louis) | 28-1 | Thad Strobach | 45-43 | Reeds Spring | South Shelby | 65-52 | Penney | Pershing Arena, NMSU, Kirksville |
| 1979 | 3A | Central (Kansas City) | 24-2 | Wayne Howe | 53-52 | St. Joseph's Academy (St. Louis) | Union | 48-47 | Camdenton | Multipurpose Fieldhouse, CMSU, Warrensburg |
| 1979 | 4A | Hickman Mills (Kansas City) | 27-4 | Clyde Cozad | 50-40 | Lee's Summit | McCluer North (Florissant) | 49-47 | Poplar Bluff | Multipurpose Fieldhouse, CMSU, Warrensburg |
| 1980 | 1A | Fairfax | 25-0 | Garey Smith | 68-42 | Delta | Hermitage | 43-42 | Northwestern (Mendon) | Heanes Center, UMC, Columbia |
| 1980 | 2A | South Harrison | 29-2 | Richard Smith | 46-35 | Paris | Scott Co. Central | 67-57 | Purdy | Hearnes Center, UMC, Columbia |
| 1980 | 3A | Visitation Academy (St. Louis) | 25-8 | Thad Strobach | 40-38 | McDonald Co. | Nevada | 47-45 | Union | Hearnes Center, UMC, Columbia |
| 1980 | 4A | Hickman Mills (Kansas City) | 27-4 | Clyde Cozad | 50-48 | McCluer North (Florissant) | Truman (Independence) | 63-52 | Poplar Bluff | Hearnes Center, UMC, Columbia |
| 1981 | 1A | Purdy | 24-3 | Bill Reece | 74-65 | Northeast (Cairo) | Polo | 63-57 | Lincoln | Hearnes Center, UMC, Columbia |
| 1981 | 2A | Palmyra | 29-3 | Robert Fohey | 66-62 | Scott Co. Central | Rock Port | 56-50 | Gainesville | Hearnes Center, UMC, Columbia |
| 1981 | 3A | McDonald County | 29-1 | Jerry Davis | 47-34 | Charleston | Macon | 57-43 | Maryville | Hearnes Center, UMC, Columbia |
| 1981 | 4A | Truman (Independence) | 27-4 | Peter Hile | 63-57 | Southwest (St. Louis) | Central (St. Joseph) | 59-50 | St. Joseph's Academy (St. Louis) | Hearnes Center, UMC, Columbia |
| 1982 | 1A | Northeast Nodaway | 30-1 | Claude Samson | 44-28 | Purdy | North Shelby | 50-48 | Skyline (Urbana) | Hearnes Center, UMC, Columbia |
| 1982 | 2A | Scott Co. Central | 31-0 | Fred Johnson | 85-49 | Salisbury | Sherwood (Creighton) | 67-66 | Gainesville | Hearnes Center, UMC, Columbia |
| 1982 | 3A | Bolivar | 28-2 | Junior Roweton | 48-43 | Visitation Academy (St. Louis) | Rosati-Kain (St. Louis) | 43-23 | Chillicothe | Hearnes Center, UMC, Columbia |
| 1982 | 4A | Paseo (Kansas City) | 28-3 | Melvin Harvey | 59-40 | Truman (Independence) | Lindbergh (St. Louis) | 60-42 | Ladue Horton-Watkins (St. Louis) | Hearnes Center, UMC, Columbia |
| 1983 | 1A | Catholic (Springfield) | 30-2 | Patti Henderson | 51-40 | Winston | Wellsville-Middletown | 66-58 | Archie | Hammons Student Center, SWMSU, Springfield |
| 1983 | 2A | Bishop Lebond (St. Joseph) | 24-4 | Jan Shores | 54-51 | Palmyra | Willow Springs | 54-38 | Viburnum | Hammons Student Center, SWMSU, Springfield |
| 1983 | 3A | McDonald County | 31-1 | Jerry Davis | 52-48 | Visitation Academy (St. Louis) | Perryville | 36-32 | St. Mary's (Independence) | Hearnes Center, UMC, Columbia |
| 1983 | 4A | Cleveland (St. Louis) | 29-2 | Ron Rhodes | 59-39 | Glendale (Springfield) | Fort Zumwalt (O'Fallon) | 53-42 | Lee's Summit | Hearnes Center, UMC, Columbia |
| 1984 | 1A | Scott Co. Central | 29-1 | Fred Johnson | 38-31 | Lincoln | Northeast Nodaway | 55-44 | Clopton | Hearnes Center, UMC, Columbia |
| 1984 | 2A | Palmyra | 24-5 | Robert Fohey | 67-44 | Brentwood (St. Louis) | Willow Springs | 44-26 | Smithville | Hearnes Center, UMC, Columbia |
| 1984 | 3A | Visitation Academy (St. Louis) | 31-2 | Thad Strobach | 51-50 | Perryvile | St. Mary's (Independence) | 41-24 | Monett | Hearnes Center, UMC, Columbia |
| 1984 | 4A | Central (Springfield) | 30-2 | Susan Alley | 56-43 | Lindbergh (St. Louis) | Hazelwood Central (Florissant) | 46-41 | Central (St. Joseph) | Hearnes Center, UMC, Columbia |
| 1985 | 1A | Scott Co. Central | 27-1 | Danny Farmer | 47-34 | Northeast Nodaway | New Bloomfield | 53-50 | Rich Hill | Hammons Student Center, SWMSU, Springfield |
| 1985 | 2A | Brentwood (St. Louis) | 28-3 | Stephen Crotz | 56-48 | Palmyra | Mt. Vernon | 46-42 | Smithville | Hammons Student Center, SWMSU, Springfield |
| 1985 | 3A | Afton (St. Louis) | 30-2 | Jan Ennen | 47-44 (OT) | Troy Buchanan | Monett | 37-30 | Nevada | Hearnes Center, UMC, Columbia |
| 1985 | 4A | Kickapoo (Springfield) | 29-1 | Sue Schuble | 49-41 | Hazelwood Central (Florissant) | St. Teresa's Academy (Kansas City) | 52-34 | Bishop Dubourg (St. Louis) | Hearnes Center, UMC, Columbia |
| 1986 | 1A | New Bloomfield | 30-1 | Kenneth Walker | 66-54 | Wheaton | Santa Fe (Alma) | 53-44 | Princeton | Hammons Student Center, SWMSU, Springfield |
| 1986 | 2A | Palmyra | 29-1 | Robert Fohey | 48-35 | Diamond | Brentwood (St. Louis) | 65-41 | Bishop Lebond (St. Joseph) | Hammons Student Center, SWMSU, Springfield |
| 1986 | 3A | Perryville | 29-2 | Steve Wunderlich | 39-34 | Kearney | Troy Buchanan | 71-32 | Monett | Hearnes Center, UMC, Columbia |
| 1986 | 4A | McCluer North (Florissant) | 30-1 | Carol Meyer | 50-48 | Hickman Mills (Kansas City) | Lee's Summit | 67-37 | Oakville (St. Louis) | Hearnes Center, UMC, Columbia |
| 1987 | 1A | Scott Co. Central | 25-5 | Danny Farmer | 73-50 | Clopton | Santa Fe (Alma) | 53-41 | King City | Hammons Student Center, SWMSU, Springfield |
| 1987 | 2A | Hermann | 24-8 | Doug Smith | 55-54 | Monroe City | Mt. Vernon | 56-53 | Holden | Hammons Student Center, SWMSU, Springfield |
| 1987 | 3A | Visitation Academy (St. Louis) | 29-4 | Thad Strohbach | 56-44 | Perryville | O'Hara (Kansas City) | 59-50 | McDonald County | Hearnes Center, UMC, Columbia |
| 1987 | 4A | Kickapoo (Springfield) | 30-0 | Sue Schuble | 63-47 | St. Teresa's Academy (Kansas City) | Normandy (St. Louis) | 61-50 | Hannibal | Hearnes Center, UMC, Columbia |
| 1988 | 1A | New Bloomfield | 31-0 | Kenneth Walker | 67-60 | Rich Hill | Scott Co. Central | 60-54 | Lutheran (Kansas City) | Hammons Student Center, SWMSU, Springfield |
| 1988 | 2A | Holden | 27-0 | Rick Riddle | 60-57 | Linn | Monroe City | 64-40 | Hartville | Hammons Student, SWMSU, Springfield |
| 1988 | 3A | Marshfield | 32-0 | Scott Ballard | 59-58 | Duchesne (St. Charles) | Central (Kansas City) | 58-48 | Festus | Hearnes Center, UMC, Columbia |
| 1988 | 4A | DeSoto | 27-5 | Ron Rhodes | 46-44 | Lee's Summit | Glendale (Springfield) | 40-38 | Hannibal | Hearnes Center, UMC, Columbia |
| 1989 | 1A | Jefferson | 31-0 | Don Edwards | 60-50 | Marion C. Early (Morrisville) | New Bloomfield | 62-60 | Scott Co. Central | Hammons Stdt. Ctr., MSU, Springfield |
| 1989 | 2A | Salisbury | 32-0 | Dennis Humphrey | 50-48 | Catholic (Springfield) | Brentwood (St. Louis) | 39-36 | North Platte | Hammons Stdt. Ctr., MSU, Springfield |
| 1989 | 3A | Marshfield | 32-0 | Scott Ballard | 55-52 | Visitation Academy (St. Louis) | O'hara (Kansas City) | 49-47 (OT) | Doniphan | Hammons Stdt. Ctr., MSU, Springfield |
| 1989 | 4A | DeSoto | 29-3 | Ron Rhodes | 48-38 | Joplin | Central (St. Joseph) | 72-47 | Central (Cape Girardeau) | Hammons Stdt. Ctr., MSU, Springfield |
| 1990 | 1A | North Shelby | 30-2 | Brad Pollitt | 63-57 | Scott Co. Central | Jefferson | 60-36 | Leeton | Hammons Stdt. Ctr., MSU, Springfield |
| 1990 | 2A | Catholic (Springfield) | 28-2 | Ken Hopper | 53-38 | Brentwood (St. Louis) | North Callaway | 40-35 | Lafayette County | Hammons Stdt. Ctr., MSU, Springfield |
| 1990 | 3A | Marshfield | 32-0 | Scott Ballard | 55-39 | Oak Grove | Visitation Academy (St. Louis) | 84-63 | Fredericktown | Hammons Stdt. Ctr., MSU, Springfield |
| 1990 | 4A | Lee's Summit | 30-0 | Larry Jansen | 38-36 | Joplin | Poplar Bluff | 73-63 | Parkway West (Ballwin) | Hammons Stdt. Ctr., MSU, Springfield |
| 1991 | 1A | Scott Co. Central | 28-1 | Danny Farmer | 56-46 | Princeton | New Bloomfield | 54-49 | Malta Bend | Hammons Stdt. Ctr., MSU, Springfield |
| 1991 | 2A | Marionville | 30-3 | Steve Shepard | 65-49 | Palmyra | Eskridge | 62-55 | Plattsburg | Hammons Stdt. Ctr., MSU, Springfield |
| 1991 | 3A | Marshfield | 31-2 | Gary Murphy | 61-43 | Visitation Academy (St. Louis) | Benton (St. Joseph) | 62-61 | Perryville | Hearnes Center, UMC, Columbia |
| 1991 | 4A | St. Joseph's Academy (St. Louis) | 30-4 | Larry Eller | 64-43 | Jefferson City | DeSoto | 61-56 (OT) | Blue Springs | Hearnes Center, UMC, Columbia |
| 1992 | 1A | Scott Co. Central | 29-0 | Danny Farmer | 85-38 | North Shelby | Wellington-Napoleon | 54-50 | Rich Hill | Hearnes Center, UMC, Columbia |
| 1992 | 2A | Catholic (Springfield) | 27-3 | Rhonda Hubbard | 50-26 | Putnam County | Kelly | 45-34 | Cole Camp | Hearnes Center, UMC, Columbia |
| 1992 | 3A | Oak Grove | 31-0 | Brad Gaines | 51-41 | Perryville | Marshfield | 55-43 | Troy Buchanan | Hearnes Center, UMC, Columbia |
| 1992 | 4A | St. Joseph's Academy (St. Louis) | 32-0 | Larry Eller | 43-32 | Jefferson City | St. Teresa's Academy (Kansas City) | 48-44 (OT) | Jackson | Hearnes Center, UMC, Columbia |
| 1993 | 1A | Scott Co. Central | 28-2 | Danny Farmer | 73-44 | Rich Hill | North Shelby | 35-28 | Wellington-Napoleon | Hearnes Center, UMC, Columbia |
| 1993 | 2A | Catholic (Springfield) | 28-5 | Rhonda Hubbard | 40-31 | Cole Camp | Palmyra | 67-57 | Eskridge | Hearnes Center, UMC, Columbia |
| 1993 | 3A | Raymore-Peculiar | 31-1 | Paul Cummings | 44-42 | Republic | Incarnate Word Academy (Bel-Nor) | 50-46 | St. Francis Borgia (Washington) | Hearnes Center, UMC, Columbia |
| 1993 | 4A | St. Joseph's Academy (St. Louis) | 28-0 | Bob Hayes | 59-43 | Kickapoo (Springfield) | Northwest (Cedar Hill) | 63-57 | William Chrisman (Independence) | Hearnes Center, UMC, Columbia |
| 1994 | 1A | Norwood | 25-7 | Don Forrest | 46-38 | Rich Hill | Wellington-Napoleon | 48-41 | Meadville | Hearnes Center, UMC, Columbia |
| 1994 | 2A | Eskridge | 28-2 | Carl Davis | 53-52 | Warsaw | Catholic (Springfield) | 41-38 (OT) | Brookfield | Hearnes Center, UMC, Columbia |
| 1994 | 3A | Republic | 30-1 | Dave McQuerter | 66-43 | Chillicothe | Troy Buchanan | 42-41 (OT) | Owensville | Hearnes Center, UMC, Columbia |
| 1994 | 4A | St. Joseph's Academy (St. Louis) | 29-1 | Bob Hayes | 67-42 | Kickapoo (Springfield) | Lee's Summit | 67-51 | Poplar Bluff | Hearnes Center, UMC, Columbia |
| 1995 | 1A | Meadville | 30-2 | Laurie Hardie | 86-76 | Scott Co. Central | Drexel | 81-68 | South Nodaway | Hearnes Center, UMC, Columbia |
| 1995 | 2A | Pembroke Hill (Kansas City) | 25-5 | Mark Spigarelli | 44-41 | Notre Dame (Cape Girardeau) | Clark County | 68-45 | Mansfield | Hearnes Center, UMC, Columbia |
| 1995 | 3A | Incarnate Word Academy (Bel-Nor) | 29-4 | Jim Johnson | 51-50 | Helias Catholic (Jefferson City) | St. Teresa's Academy (Kansas City) | 67-58 | St. James | Hearnes Center, UMC, Columbia |
| 1995 | 4A | Cor Jesu Academy (St. Louis) | 31-0 | Gary Glassock | 59-48 | Park Hill (Kansas City) | Jackson | 52-47 | Holt (Wentzville) | Hearnes Center, UMC, Columbia |
| 1996 | 1A | Drexel | 31-0 | Brent Bartlett | 60-45 | Gallatin | Atlanta | 63-57 | Norwood | Hearnes Center, UMC, Columbia |
| 1996 | 2A | Skyline (Urbana) | 29-1 | Lynn Long | 56-43 | Palmyra | Hartville | 70-66 | Eskridge | Hearnes Center, UMC, Columbia |
| 1996 | 3A | Marshfield | 29-4 | Gary Murphy | 65-52 | Central (New Madrid Co.) | Incarnate Word Academy (Bel-Nor) | 48-47 | Warrensburg | Hearnes Center, UMC, Columbia |
| 1996 | 4A | Glendale (Springfield) | 27-3 | Nyla Milleson | 71-66 | Jackson | Cor Jesu Academy (St. Louis) | 67-54 | Truman (Independence) | Hearnes Center, UMC, Columbia |
| 1997 | 1A | Jefferson | 30-2 | Don Edwards | 59-54 (OT) | Greenwood | Atlanta | 67-61 | Dadeville | Hearnes Center, UMC, Columbia |
| 1997 | 2A | Skyline (Urbana) | 31-1 | Lynn Long | 61-45 | Notre Dame (Cape Girardeau) | Palmyra | 65-39 | Hartville | Hearnes Center, UMC, Columbia |
| 1997 | 3A | Marshfield | 30-2 | Gary Murphy | 61-48 | Rosary (St. Louis) | Nevada | 58-39 | Eureka | Hearnes Center, UMC, Columbia |
| 1997 | 4A | Gateway Tech (St. Louis) | 28-0 | Sherman Curtis | 42-41 | Jackson | Glendale (Springfield) | 46-31 | Blue Springs | Hearnes Center, UMC, Columbia |
| 1998 | 1A | Atlanta | 31-0 | Bob Roberts | 62-56 | Appleton City | Norwood | 54-46 | North Andrew Co. | Hearnes Center, UMC, Columbia |
| 1998 | 2A | Monroe City | 31-1 | Bob Plourde | 51-45 | Skyline (Urbana) | Pierce City | 29-27 | John Burroughs (St. Louis) | Hearnes Center, UMC, Columbia |
| 1998 | 3A | Rosary (St. Louis) | 31-2 | Ron Sanford | 50-48 | Savannah | Marshfield | 64-43 | St. Francis Borgia (Washington) | Hearnes Center, UMC, Columbia |
| 1998 | 4A | West Plains | 29-3 | Scott Womack | 52-36 | Jackson | Truman (Independence) | 51-39 | Gateway Tech | Hearnes Center, UMC, Columbia |
| 1999 | 1A | Tarkio | 32-0 | Doug Kingery | 55-38 | Crest Ridge | Newburg | 52-33 | Marion County | Hearnes Center, UMC, Columbia |
| 1999 | 2A | Pembroke Hill (Kansas City) | 29-2 | Mark Spigarelli | 59-34 | East Newton | Monroe City | 55-47 | John Burroughs (St. Louis) | Hearnes Center, UMC, Columbia |
| 1999 | 3A | Marshfield | 31-1 | Gary Murphy | 78-58 | Savannah | St. Francis Borgia (Washington) | 38-32 | Incarnate Word Academy (Bel-Nor) | Hearnes Center, UMC, Columbia |
| 1999 | 4A | Gateway Tech (St. Louis) | 22-6 | Sherman Curtis | 38-25 | St. Joseph's Academy (St. Louis) | Blue Springs | 55-47 | Kickapoo (Springfield) | Hearnes Center, UMC, Columbia |
| 2000 | 1A | Glasgow | 28-5 | Mike Reynolds | 53-46 | Climax Springs | Albany | 51-42 | Newburg | Hearnes Center, UMC, Columbia |
| 2000 | 2A | Monroe City | 30-2 | Bob Plourde | 59-44 | John Burroughs (St. Louis) | East Newton | 64-48 | St. Pius X (Kansas City) | Hearnes Center, UMC, Columbia |
| 2000 | 3A | Nixa | 31-1 | Randy Towe | 67-51 | Savannah | Visitation Academy (St. Louis) | 51-47 | Bishop Dubourg (St. Louis) | Hearnes Center, UMC, Columbia |
| 2000 | 4A | Eureka | 28-3 | James Alsup | 52-36 | Poplar Bluff | Hickman (Columbia) | 61-33 | Lee's Summit North | Hearnes Center, UMC, Columbia |
| 2001 | 1A | Silex | 28-4 | Tony Francis | 61-52 | Climax Springs | Tarkio | 55-49 | Couch | Hearnes Center, UMC, Columbia |
| 2001 | 2A | Stockton | 25-6 | Tony Armstrong | 61-42 | Notre Dame (Cape Girardeau) | Elsberry | 49-44 | East Newton | Hearnes Center, UMC, Columbia |
| 2001 | 3A | Notre Dame de Sion (Kansas City) | 26-5 | Kristy Guffey | 70-40 | Doniphan | Duchesne (St. Charles) | 69-61 | Marshfield | Hearnes Center, UMC, Columbia |
| 2001 | 4A | Kickapoo (Springfield) | 27-4 | Sue Schuble | 50-42 | Parkway West (Ballwin) | Jackson | 58-55 (OT) | Lee's Summit North | Hearnes Center, UMC, Columbia |
| 2002 | 1A | New Haven | 28-4 | Melanie Schmit | 58-49 | Northeast Nodaway | Chadwick | 48-38 | Macks Creek | Hearnes Center, UMC, Columbia |
| 2002 | 2A | Notre Dame (Cape Girardeau) | 29-2 | Jerry Grim | 63-57 | Elsberry | Stockton | 67-58 | Seymour | Hearnes Center, UMC, Columbia |
| 2002 | 3A | Notre Dame de Sion (Kansas City) | 24-7 | Kristy Guffey | 63-46 | Visitation Academy (St. Louis) | Marshfield | 57-42 | St. James | Hearnes Center, UMC, Columbia |
| 2002 | 4A | Lee's Summit North | 24-5 | Tricia Lillygren | 55-50 | Hickman (Columbia) | Poplar Bluff | 51-29 | Gateway Tech (St. Louis) | Hearnes Center, UMC, Columbia |
| 2003 | 1A | Adair Co. R-II (Brashear) | 28-2 | Sara Parish | 54-38 | Chilhowee | Delta | 54-43 | Worth County | Hearnes Center, UMC, Columbia |
| 2003 | 2A | Skyline (Urbana) | 29-4 | Kevin Cheek | 61-49 | Clopton | Stoutland | 45-42 | Christian (St. Joseph) | Hearnes Center, UMC, Columbia |
| 2003 | 3A | Stockton | 28-2 | Tony Armstrong | 80-51 | John Burroughs (St. Louis) | Lutheran (St. Charles) | 67-61 | Hermann | Hearnes Center, UMC, Columbia |
| 2003 | 4A | Duchesne (St. Charles) | 29-2 | Charles Elmendorf | 56-52 | Notre Dame (Cape Girardeau) | Benton (St. Joseph) | 39-38(Double OT) | Carthage | Hearnes Center, UMC, Columbia |
| 2003 | 5A | Kickapoo (Springfield) | 31-0 | Stephanie Phillips | 51-46 | St. Joseph's Academy (St. Louis) | Jackson | 50-44 | Lee’s Summit | Hearnes Center, UMC, Columbia |
| 2004 | 1A | Adair Co. R-II (Brashear) | 32-0 | Sara Williams | 51-35 | Walnut Grove | Chadwick | 54-45 | Mound City | Hearnes Center, UMC, Columbia |
| 2004 | 2A | Skyline (Urbana) | 30-2 | Kevin Cheek | 59-46 | Clopton | Christian (St. Joseph) | 57-48 | Stoutland | Hearnes Center, UMC, Columbia |
| 2004 | 3A | Stockton | 30-1 | Tony Armstrong | 56-44 | Metro (St. Louis) | California | 58-52 | Hancock (St. Louis) | Hearnes Center, UMC, Columbia |
| 2004 | 4A | Republic | 24-7 | Kris Flood | 61-55 | Duchesne (St. Charles) | St. James | 45-40 | Center (Kansas City) | Hearnes Center, UMC, Columbia |
| 2004 | 5A | St. Joseph's Academy (St. Louis) | 26-4 | Julie Matheny | 56-44 | Hickman (Columbia) | Incarnate Word Academy (Bel-Nor) | 60-53 | Lee’s Summit | Hearnes Center, UMC, Columbia |
| 2005 | 1A | Chadwick | 27-4 | Doug Dunn | 51-32 | New Franklin | DeKalb | 37-31 | Leeton | Mizzou Arena, UMC, Columbia |
| 2005 | 2A | Clopton | 32-0 | Ed Lindsay | 57-50 | Metro (St. Louis) | Gainesville | 61-53 | Crest Ridge | Mizzou Arena, UMC, Columbia |
| 2005 | 3A | Pembroke Hill (Kansas City) | 27-4 | Mark Spigarelli | 47-45 (OT) | Lutheran (St. Charles) | Hancock (St. Louis) | 55-54 | Catholic (Springfield) | Mizzou Arena, UMC, Columbia |
| 2005 | 4A | Ozark | 24-8 | Yancey Little | 34-31 | Lincoln Prep Academy (Kansas City) | St. James | 49-47 | Jennings (St. Louis) | Mizzou Arena, UMC, Columbia |
| 2005 | 5A | Kickapoo (Springfield) | 30-1 | Stephanie Phillips | 52-33 | Lee’s Summit | Incarnate Word Academy (Bel-Nor) | 62-43 | Nerinx Hall (Webster Groves) | Mizzou Arena, UMC, Columbia |
| 2006 | 1A | DeKalb | 30-2 | Cori Elifrits | 51-39 | Leeton | Delta | 42-37 | Silex | Mizzou Arena, UMC, Columbia |
| 2006 | 2A | Metro (St. Louis) | 29-3 | Gary Glasscock | 49-44 | Clopton | Marion C. Early(Morrisville) | 68-64(OT) | North Platte | Mizzou Arena, UMC, Columbia |
| 2006 | 3A | Pembroke Hill (Kansas City) | 26-5 | Mark Spigarelli | 66-40 | Blair Oaks (Jefferson City) | Westran (Huntsville) | 63-51 | Doniphan | Mizzou Arena, UMC, Columbia |
| 2006 | 4A | Ozark | 25-6 | Yancey Little | 48-38 | Lee’s Summit West | Lutheran South (St. Louis) | 60-51 | Duchesne (St. Charles) | Mizzou Arena, UMC, Columbia |
| 2006 | 5A | Incarnate Word Academy (Bel-Nor) | 31-1 | Dan Rolfes | 43-31 | Notre Dame de Sion (Kansas City) | Jefferson City | 62-48 | Hazelwood East (Spanish Lake) | Mizzou Arena, UMC, Columbia |
| 2007 | 1A | Walnut Grove | 27-4 | Darin Meinders | 41-22 | Leeton | Mound City | 52-43 | Northeast (Cairo) | Mizzou Arena, UMC, Columbia |
| 2007 | 2A | Hartville | 27-5 | Mike Percival | 49-48 | Westran (Huntsville) | Clopton | 72-63 | Osceola | Mizzou Arena, UMC, Columbia |
| 2007 | 3A | Metro (St. Louis) | 28-4 | Gary Glasscock | 63-40 | Catholic (Springfield) | Blair Oaks (Jefferson City) | 37-28 | Pembroke Hill (Kansas City) | Mizzou Arena, UMC, Columbia |
| 2007 | 4A | Benton (St. Joseph) | 30-0 | Brett Goodwin | 52-37 | Farmington | Bolivar | 64-53 | St. Dominic (O'Fallon) | Mizzou Arena, UMC, Columbia |
| 2007 | 5A | Liberty | 27-4 | Brad Oyler | 56-46 | Hazelwood East (Spanish Lake) | Hickman (Columbia) | 69-41 | Normandy (St. Louis) | Mizzou Arena, UMC, Columbia |
| 2008 | 1A | Northeast (Cairo) | 28-3 | Bob Roberts | 54-32 | Delta | Meadville | 58-36 | Macks Creek | Mizzou Arena, UMC, Columbia |
| 2008 | 2A | Penney (Hamilton) | 32-0 | David Prather | 47-39 | Westran (Huntsville) | Clopton | 59-54 | Crane | Mizzou Arena, UMC, Columbia |
| 2008 | 3A | Skyline (Urbana) | 29-3 | Kevin Cheek | 44-43 | South Shelby (Shelbina) | Hermann | 65-56 | Metro (St. Louis) | Mizzoui Arena, UMC, Columbia |
| 2008 | 4A | Bolivar | 29-2 | Gary Keeling | 47-43 (OT) | Notre Dame de Sion (Kansas City) | McCluer South-Berkely (Ferguson) | 63-45 | Notre Dame (St. Louis) | Mizzou Arena, UMC, Columbia |
| 2008 | 5A | Rock Bridge (Columbia) | 26-6 | Jill Nagel | 50-35 | Incarnate Word Academy (Bel-Nor) | St. Joseph's Academy (St. Louis) | 70-67 | Hickman Mills (Kansas City) | Mizzou Arena, UMC, Columbia |
| 2009 | 1A | Exeter | 27-2 | Jason Cole | 56-31 | Marion County | Jefferson (Conception) | 50-31 | Bakersfield | Mizzou Arena, UMC, Columbia |
| 2009 | 2A | Sparta | 27-0 | Jerry Songer | 56-49 | Canton | New Franklin | 41-39 | Couch | Mizzou Arena, UMC, Columbia |
| 2009 | 3A | Cardinal Ritter (St. Louis) | 20-4 | Darren Wade | 50-49 | Skyline (Urbana) | Fair Grove | 82-52 | California | Mizzou Arena, UMC, Columbia |
| 2009 | 4A | Platte County | 25-3 | Chris Stubbs | 81-75 | Webb City | Miller Career Academy (St. Louis) | 54-50 | Dexter | Mizzou Arena, UMC, Columbia |
| 2009 | 5A | Nixa | 25-2 | Jim Middleton | 56-39 | Blue Springs | Hazelwood Central (Florissant) | 58-38 | Nerinx Hall (Webster Groves) | Mizzou Arena, UMC, Columbia |
| 2010 | 1A | Montrose | 31-0 | Scott Ireland | 45-37 | Jefferson | Marion County | 52-48 | Naylor | Mizzou Arena, UMC, Columbia |
| 2010 | 2A | Harrisburg | 31-0 | Daniel Bachmeier | 52-40 | Thayer | Miller | 78-69 | Canton | Mizzou Arena, UMC, Columbia |
| 2010 | 3A | Mt. Vernon | 30-3 | Doug Hepler | 44-30 | Cardinal Ritter (St. Louis) | Maryville | 60-44 | Macon | Mizzou Arena, UMC, Columbia |
| 2010 | 4A | Webb City | 33-1 | Brad Shorter | 60-53 | Notre Dame (Cape Girardeau) | O'Hara (Kansas City) | 40-37 | St. Dominic (O'Fallon) | Mizzou Arena, UMC, Columbia |
| 2010 | 5A | Incarnate Word Academy (Bel-Nor) | 30-1 | Dan Rolfes | 52-43 | Blue Springs | Kickapoo (Springfield) | 52-36 | Ft. Zumwalt West (O'Fallon) | Mizzou Arena, UMC, Columbia |
| 2011 | 1A | Marion County | 30-0 | Mike Johnson | 62-38 | Exeter | Montrose | 59-45 | Jefferson (Conception) | Mizzou Arena, UMC, Columbia |
| 2011 | 2A | Purdy | 26-6 | Grant Young | 55-49 | Couch | Clopton | 58-33 | North Platte | Mizzou Arena, UMC, Columbia |
| 2011 | 3A | Stockton | 28-3 | Richard Driscoll | 74-52 | Hermann | Hallsville | 61-55 | Kennett | Mizzou Arena, UMC, Columbia |
| 2011 | 4A | St. Dominic (O'Fallon) | 30-0 | Suzie Mennemeier | 61-44 | Smithville | St. Francis Borgia (Washington) | 53-43 | Farmington | Mizzou Arena, UMC, Columbia |
| 2011 | 5A | Incarnate Word Acandemy (Bel-Nor) | 27-4 | Dan Rolfes | 59-49 | Blue Springs | Webb City | 69-64 | St. Joseph's Academy (St. Louis) | Mizzou Arena, UMC, Columbia |
| 2012 | 1A | Eminence | 29-1 | Jeff Williams | 36-35 | Walnut Grove | Marion County | 65-38 | Jefferson (Conception) | Mizzou Arena, UMC, Columbia |
| 2012 | 2A | Harrisburg | 29-2 | Daniel Bachmeier | 43-32 | New Haven | Marionville | 43-37 | North Platte | Mizzou Arena, UMC, Columbia |
| 2012 | 3A | Mt. Vernon | 26-7 | Doug Hepler | 52-48 | Stockton | Hallsville | 47-44 | Seymour | Mizzou Arena, UMC, Columbia |
| 2012 | 4A | Republic | 23-8 | Kris Flood | 53-51 | Smithville | Miller Career Academy (St. Louis) | 59-50 | Westminster Christian Academy (Chesterfield) | Mizzou Arena, UMC, Columbia |
| 2012 | 5A | Rock Bridge (Columbia) | 26-3 | Jill Nagel | 52-41 | Blue Springs | Incarnate Word Academy (Bel-Nor) | 49-45 | Ft. Zumwalt West (O'Fallon) | Mizzou Arena, UMC, Columbia |
| 2013 | 1A | Walnut Grove | 30-2 | Rory Henry | 47-46 | Chamois | Mercer Co. | 75-54 | Chadwick | Mizzou Arena, UMC, Columbia |
| 2013 | 2A | Crane | 30-3 | Jeremy Mullins | 55-45 | New Haven | Skyline (Urbana) | 64-53 | Marceline | Mizzou Arena, UMC, Columbia |
| 2013 | 3A | Lutheran (St. Charles) | 28-4 | Erin Pauk | 80-68 | Cameron | St. James | 65-44 | North Technical | Mizzou Arena, UMC, Columbia |
| 2013 | 4A | Incarnate Word Academy (Bel-Nor) | 31-0 | Dan Rolfes | 63-22 | Webb City | Smithville | 54-36 | Dexter | Mizzou Arena, UMC, Columbia |
| 2013 | 5A | Rock Bridge (Columbia) | 25-5 | Jill Nagel | 45-38 | St. Joseph's Academy (St. Louis) | Blue Springs | 45-13 | Cor Jesu Academy (St. Louis) | Mizzou Arena, UMC, Columbia |
| 2014 | 1A | Walnut Grove | 29-5 | Rory Henry | 84-49 | North Andrew (Rosendale) | Chadwick | 59-37 | Marion County | Mizzou Arena, UMC, Columbia |
| 2014 | 2A | Crane | 30-1 | Jeremy Mullins | 67-52 | Skyline (Urbana) | New Franklin | 51-38 | New Haven | Mizzou Arena, UMC, Columbia |
| 2014 | 3A | Eldorado Springs | 28-3 | Beau Swopes | 66-56 | Ash Grove | Hermann | 68-53 | Saxony Lutheran (Cape Girardeau) | Mizzou Arena, UMC, Columbia |
| 2014 | 4A | Incarnate Word Academy (Bel-Nor) | 31-1 | Dan Rolfes | 60-43 | Dexter | Marshfield | 42-33 | Benton (St. Joseph) | Mizzou Arena, UMC, Columbia |
| 2014 | 5A | Rock Bridge (Columbia) | 29-3 | Jill Nagel | 62-45 | Lee's Summit North | St. Joseph's Academy (St. Louis) | 63-59 | Eureka | Mizzou Arena, UMC, Columbia |
| 2015 | 1A | Walnut Grove | 31-1 | Rory Henry | 48-45 | Naylor | Tuscumbia | 74-59 | Southwest (Livingston County) | Mizzou Arena, UMC, Columbia |
| 2015 | 2A | Crane | 30-2 | Jeremy Mullins | 58-51 | Skyline (Urbana) | Clopton | 54-41 | Northeast (Cairo) | Mizzou Arena, UMC, Columbia |
| 2015 | 3A | Central (Park Hills) | 30-1 | Josh Mapes | 55-19 | Cardinal Ritter (St. Louis) | Boonville | 63-54 | Buffalo | Mizzou Arena, UMC, Columbia |
| 2015 | 4A | Incarnate Word Academy (Bel-Nor) | 29-2 | Dan Rolfes | 60-27 | MICDS (St. Louis) | Bolivar | 45-43 | Hillcrest (Springfield) | Mizzou Arena, UMC, Columbia |
| 2015 | 5A | Rock Bridge (Columbia) | 24-7 | Jill Nagel | 49-35 | Liberty | Parkway North (St. Louis) | 67-54 | Cor Jesu Academy (St. Louis) | Mizzou Arena, UMC, Columbia |
| 2016 | 1A | Mound City/Craig | 30-1 | Derek Petty | 57-45 | Naylor | Walnut Grove | 52-51 | Glasgow | Mizzou Arena, UMC, Columbia |
| 2016 | 2A | Crane | 32-1 | Jeremy Mullins | 78-57 | Neelyville | Skyline (Urbana) | 36-13 | New Franklin | Mizzou Arena, UMC, Columbia |
| 2016 | 3A | Strafford | 30-3 | Steve Frank | 50-46 | Saxony Lutheran (Cape Girardeau) | St. Pius X (Kansas City) | 57-55 | Southern Boone | Mizzou Arena, UMC, Columbia |
| 2016 | 4A | Benton (St. Joseph) | 32-0 | Brett Goodwin | 41-34 | MICDS (St. Louis) | Owensville | 55-48 | Incarnate Word Academy (Bel-Nor) | Mizzou Arena, UMC, Columbia |
| 2016 | 5A | Kickapoo (Springfield) | 29-3 | Jim Pendergrass | 63-53 | Kirkwood | Liberty | 53-46 | Francis Howell (O'Fallon) | Mizzou Arena, UMC, Columbia |
| 2017 | 1A | Mercer | 31-1 | Dan Owens | 43-34 | Walnut Grove | South Iron | 61-54 | Prairie Home | Mizzou Arena, UMC, Columbia |
| 2017 | 2A | Skyline (Urbana) | 31-2 | Kevin Cheek | 69-42 | Adrian | Scotland County | 49-41 | Oran | Mizzou Arena, UMC, Columbia |
| 2017 | 3A | Strafford | 33-0 | Steve Frank | 83-37 | Whitfield (St. Louis) | Lutheran North (St. Louis) | 61-56 | Trenton | Mizzou Arena, UMC, Columbia |
| 2017 | 4A | Incarnate Word Academy (Bel-Nor) | 28-4 | Dan Rolfes | 59-37 | St. Pius X (Kansas City) | Dexter | 47-38 | Carl Junction | Mizzou Arena, UMC, Columbia |
| 2017 | 5A | Kirkwood | 28-3 | Ron Sanford | 43-36 | Lee's Summit | Rock Bridge (Columbia) | 64-51 | St. Joseph's Academy (St. Louis) | Mizzou Arena, UMC, Columbia |
| 2018 | 1A | Mound City/Craig | 29-3 | Derek Petty | 52-35 | Bradleyville | Wheatland | 56-50 | Glasgow | JHQ Arena, MSU, Springfield |
| 2018 | 2A | Neelyville | 26-4 | Becky Hale | 70-51 | Mid-Buchanan | Skyline (Urbana) | 64-35 | Northeast (Cairo) | JHQ Arena, MSU, Springfield |
| 2018 | 3A | Strafford | 33-0 | Steve Frank | 77-36 | California | Whitfield (St. Louis) | 60-42 | Clark County | JHQ Arena, MSU, Springfield |
| 2018 | 4A | Incarnate Word Academy (Bel-Nor) | 27-5 | Dan Rolfes | 69-35 | Carl Junction | Kearney | 61-52 | Miller Career Academy (St. Louis) | JHQ Arena, MSU, Springfield |
| 2018 | 5A | Kirkwood | 28-3 | Ron Sanford | 67-50 | Kickapoo (Springfield) | St. Joseph's Academy (St. Louis) | 49-48 | Liberty | JHQ Arena, MSU, Springfield |
| 2019 | 1A | Walnut Grove | 28-5 | Rory Henry | 52-35 | Stanberry | Community | 56-49 | Lakeland | JHQ Arena, MSU, Springfield |
| 2019 | 2A | Thayer | 30-3 | Cecil Meyer | 52-35 | Mid-Buchanan | Hartville | 60-55 | Clopton | JHQ Arena, MSU, Springfield |
| 2019 | 3A | Strafford | 33-0 | Steve Frank | 61-53 | Lutheran North (St. Louis) | Trenton | 54-40 | Licking | JHQ Arena, MSU, Springfield |
| 2019 | 4A | Incarnate Word Academy (Bel-Nor) | 30-2 | Dan Rolfes | 61-35 | Lincoln College Prep | Logan-Rogersville | 54-33 | Miller Career Academy (St. Louis) | JHQ Arena, MSU, Springfield |
| 2019 | 5A | North Kansas City | 29-2 | Jeff Lacy | 43-34 | Jefferson City | Parkway Central (St. Louis) | 55-53 | Republic | JHQ Arena, MSU, Springfield |
| 2020 | 1A | Walnut Grove | 28-5 | Rory Henry | 52-41 | Jefferson (Conception)/South Nodaway | No 3rd Place (COVID) | - | No 3rd Place (COVID) | JHQ Arena, MSU, Springfield |
| 2020 | 2A | East Buchanan | 29-3 | Cori Elms | 62-51 | Tipton | No 3rd Place (COVID) | - | No 3rd Place (COVID) | JHQ Arena, MSU, Springfield |
| 2020 | 3A | Strafford | 30-3 | Dustin Larsen | 65-62 | Licking | No 3rd Place (COVID) | - | No 3rd Place (COVID) | JHQ Arena, MSU, Springfield |
| 2020 | 4A | No Champion (COVID) | - | - | - | - | - | - | - | - |
| 2020 | 5A | No Champion (COVID) | - | - | - | - | - | - | - | - |
| 2021 | 1A | Jefferson (Conception)/South Nodaway | 31-0 | Tyler Pederson | 56-44 | Leeton | Walnut Grove | 52-44 | South Iron | JHQ Arena, MSU, Springfield |
| 2021 | 2A | Ellington | 23-5 | David Burrows | 63-56 | Wellington-Napolean | Blue Eye | 59-52 | Scotland County | JHQ Arena, MSU, Springfield |
| 2021 | 3A | Lift for Life Academy Charter (St. Louis) | 15-11 | Chandra Palmer | 56-52 | Skyline (Urbana) | Steelville | 45-44 | Tipton | JHQ Arena, MSU, Springfield |
| 2021 | 4A | Boonville | 27-2 | Jaryt Hunziker | 58-52 | Mount Vernon | Vashon (St. Louis) | 57-37 | Benton (St. Joseph) | JHQ Arena, MSU, Springfield |
| 2021 | 5A | Whitfield (St. Louis) | 27-4 | Michael Slater | 50-34 | West Plains | Union | 53-43 | William Chrisman (Independence) | JHQ Arena, MSU, Springfield |
| 2021 | 6A | Incarnate Word Academy (Bel-Nor) | 29-0 | Dan Rolfes | 58-37 | Webster Groves | Kickapoo (Springfield) | 79-47 | Staley (Kansas City) | JHQ Arena, MSU, Springfield |
| 2022 | 1A | Jefferson (Conception)/South Nodaway | 28-2 | Tyler Pederson | 63-50 | Delta | Leeton | 58-39 | Walnut Grove | JHQ Arena, MSU, Springfield |
| 2022 | 2A | Wellington-Napolean | 28-2 | Andy Hampton | 52-31 | Ellington | Blue Eye | 59-19 | St. Paul Lutheran(Concordia) | JHQ Arena, MSU, Springfield] |
| 2022 | 3A | El Dorado Springs | 29-3 | Beau J. Swopes | 61-26 | South Shelby | Strafford | 64-34 | West County | JHQ Arena, MSU, Springfield |
| 2022 | 4A | John Burroughs (St. Louis) | 22-4 | Jacob Yorg | 54-46 | Benton (St. Joseph) | Helias Catholic (Jefferson City) | 51-40 | St. James | JHQ Arena, MSU, Springfield |
| 2022 | 5A | West Plains | 27-4 | Scott Womack | 50-37 | Whitfield (St. Louis) | Webster Groves | 54-33 | Smithville | JHQ Arena, MSU, Springfield |
| 2022 | 6A | Incarnate Word Academy (Bel-Nor) | 29-0 | Dan Rolfes | 67-50 | Kickapoo (Springfield) | Blue Springs South | 63-43 | St. Joseph's Academy (St. Louis) | JHQ Arena, MSU, Springfield |
| 2023 | 1A | Meadville | 31-0 | Steve Carvajal | 39-28 | Chadwick | Jefferson (Conception)/South Nodaway | 46-42 | Leeton | Great Southern Bank Arena, MSU, Springfield |
| 2023 | 2A | Tipton | 31-1 | Jason Culpepper | 55-36 | Bishop Lebond | New Haven | 44-43 | Norwood | Great Southern Bank Arena, MSU, Springfield] |
| 2023 | 3A | Fair Grove | 29-3 | Jenny Talbert | 54-52 | El Dorado Springs | Skyline (Urbana) | 58-29 | West County | Great Southern Bank Arena, MSU, Springfield |
| 2023 | 4A | Vashon (St. Louis) | 27-5 | John Albert | 79-77 | Benton (St. Joseph) | Central (Park Hills) | 57-39 | Southern Boone | Great Southern Bank Arena, MSU, Springfield |
| 2023 | 5A | Lutheran (St. Charles) | 27-5 | Erin Luttschwager | 44-39 | Carl Junction | West Plains | 42-38 | Notre Dame (Cape Girardeau) | Great Southern Bank Arena, MSU, Springfield |
| 2023 | 6A | Incarnate Word Academy (Bel-Nor) | 32-0 | Dan Rolfes | 57-30 | Rock Bridge (Columbia) | Raytown | 67-53 | Eureka | Great Southern Bank Arena, MSU, Springfield |
| 2024 | 1A | Jefferson (Conception)/South Nodaway | 30-1 | Aaron Murphy | 64-52 | Northeast (Cairo) | Delta | 61-57 | Liberal | Mizzou Arena, UMC, Columbia |
| 2024 | 2A | Skyline (Urbana) | 30-2 | Kevin Cheek | 61-47 | Principia (St. Louis) | Tipton | 62-35 | Norwood | Mizzou Arena, UMC, Columbia |
| 2024 | 3A | Fair Grove | 29-3 | Gary Greene | 33-27 | El Dorado Springs | Centralia | 36-34 | St. Pius X (Festus) | Mizzou Arena, UMC, Columbia |
| 2024 | 4A | Lift for Life Academy Charter (St. Louis) | 28-3 | Chantell Polk | 75-57 | Central (Park Hills) | Chillicothe | 50-39 | Owensville | Mizzou Arena, UMC, Columbia |
| 2024 | 5A | John Burroughs (St. Louis) | 28-3 | Jacob Yorg | 57-41 | Lutheran (St. Charles) | Marshfield | 47-32 | Smithville | Mizzou Arena, UMC, Columbia |
| 2024 | 6A | Incarnate Word Academy (Bel-Nor) | 31-0 | Dan Rolfes | 53-43 | Kickapoo (Springfield) | Rock Bridge (Columbia) | 60-51 | Cor Jesu Academy (St. Louis) | Mizzou Arena, UMC, Columbia |
| 2025 | 1A | Chadwick | 28-4 | James Pendergrass | 44-43 | Northeast (Cairo) | Walnut Grove | 58-45 | Rock Port | Mizzou Arena, UMC, Columbia |
| 2025 | 2A | Skyline (Urbana) | 29-3 | Kevin Cheek | 53-45 | St. Vincent (Perryville) | Tipton | 61-42 | Norwood | Mizzou Arena, UMC, Columbia |
| 2025 | 3A | Fair Grove | 28-4 | Gary Greene | 39-33 | Principia (St. Louis) | Lone Jack | 48-39 | Portageville | Mizzou Arena, UMC, Columbia |
| 2025 | 4A | Doniphan | 29-2 | Adam Epps | 63-59 | Benton (St. Joseph) | Logan-Rogersville | 60-58 | MICDS (St. Louis) | Mizzou Arena, UMC, Columbia |
| 2025 | 5A | Lift for Life Academy Charter (St. Louis) | 22-6 | Chris Porter | 63-42 | St. Teresa's Academy (Kansas City) | Fort Zumwalt South (O'Fallon) | 38-35 | Helias Catholic (Jefferson City) | Mizzou Arena, UMC, Columbia |
| 2025 | 6A | Incarnate Word Academy (Bel-Nor) | 29-2 | Dan Rolfes | 55-41 | Staley (Kansas City) | Kickapoo (Springfield) | 45-31 | Cor Jesu Academy (St. Louis) | Mizzou Arena, UMC, Columbia |
| 2026 | 1A | St. Elizabeth | 30-2 | Quentin Voss | 68-64 | Delta | Rock Port | 51-38 | Northeast (Cairo) | Mizzou Arena, UMC, Columbia |
| 2026 | 2A | Tipton | 24-8 | Jason Culpepper | 76-46 | Portageville | Marionville | 68-49 | Barstow | Mizzou Arena, UMC, Columbia |
| 2026 | 3A | Principia (St. Louis) | 30-2 | Josh Spuhl | 60-32 | St. Vincent | Skyline | 59-42 | Lone Jack | Mizzou Arena, UMC, Columbia |
| 2026 | 4A | Strafford | 29-3 | Dustin Larsen | 75-45 | Doniphan | Cardinal Ritter | 65-60 | Benton (St. Joseph) | Mizzou Arena, UMC, Columbia |
| 2026 | 5A | Lift for Life Academy Charter (St. Louis) | 16-11 | Chris Porter | 60-41 | MICDS (St. Louis) | Marshfield | 57-42 | Grandview | Mizzou Arena, UMC, Columbia |
| 2026 | 6A | Incarnate Word Academy (Bel-Nor) | 29-2 | Dan Rolfes | 50-46 | Staley (Kansas City) | Lee's Summit West | 65-52 | Jackson | Mizzou Arena, UMC, Columbia |

== Number of titles won by school ==
| School | Number of titles | Years won |
|---|---|---|
| Adair Co. R-II (Brashear) | 2 | 2003, 2004 |
| Afton (St. Louis) | 1 | 1985 |
| Atlanta | 1 | 1998 |
| Benton (St. Joseph) | 2 | 2007, 2016 |
| Bishop LeBlond (St. Joseph) | 1 | 1983 |
| Bolivar | 2 | 1982, 2008 |
| Boonville | 1 | 2021 |
| Brentwood (St. Louis) | 1 | 1985 |
| Cardinal Ritter (St. Louis) | 1 | 2009 |
| Catholic (Springfield) | 4 | 1984, 1990, 1992, 1993 |
| Central (Park Hills) | 1 | 2015 |
| Central (Springfield) | 1 | 1984 |
| Chadwick | 2 | 2005, 2025 |
| Cleveland (St. Louis) | 1 | 1983 |
| Clopton | 1 | 2005 |
| Cor Jesu Academy (St. Louis) | 1 | 1995 |
| Crane | 4 | 2013, 2014, 2015, 2016 |
| DeKalb | 1 | 2006 |
| Desoto | 2 | 1988, 1989 |
| Doniphan | 1 | 2025 |
| Drexel | 1 | 1996 |
| Duchesne (St. Charles) | 1 | 2003 |
| East Buchanan | 1 | 2020 |
| El Dorado Springs | 1 | 2022 |
| Ellington | 1 | 2021 |
| Eminence | 1 | 2012 |
| Eskridge | 1 | 1994 |
| Eureka | 1 | 2000 |
| Exeter | 1 | 2009 |
| Fair Grove | 3 | 2023, 2024, 2025 |
| Fairfax | 1 | 1980 |
| Gateway Tech (St. Louis) | 2 | 1997, 1999 |
| Glasgow | 1 | 2000 |
| Glendale (Springfield) | 1 | 1996 |
| Harrisburg | 2 | 2010, 2012 |
| Hartville | 1 | 2007 |
| Hermann | 1 | 1987 |
| Hickman Mills (Kansas City) | 3 | 1977, 1979, 1980 |
| Holden | 1 | 1988 |
| Incarnate Word Academy (Bel-Nor) | 16 | 1995, 2006, 2010, 2011, 2013, 2014, 2015, 2017, 2018, 2019, 2021, 2022, 2023, 2024, 2025, 2026 |
| Jefferson | 2 | 1989, 1997 |
| Jefferson (Conception)/South Nodaway | 3 | 2021, 2022, 2024 |
| John Burroughs (St. Louis) | 2 | 2022, 2024 |
| Kansas City Central | 1 | 1979 |
| Kickapoo (Springfield) | 6 | 1985, 1987, 2001, 2003, 2005, 2016 |
| Kirkwood | 2 | 2017, 2018 |
| Knox County | 1 | 1976 |
| Lee's Summit | 2 | 1978, 1990 |
| Lee's Summit North | 1 | 2002 |
| Liberty | 1 | 2007 |
| Lift for Life Academy Charter (St. Louis) | 4 | 2021, 2024, 2025, 2026 |
| Lutheran (St. Charles) | 2 | 2013, 2023 |
| Marion County | 1 | 2011 |
| Marionville | 1 | 1991 |
| Marshfield | 7 | 1988, 1989, 1990, 1991, 1996, 1997, 1999 |
| McCluer North (Florissant) | 1 | 1986 |
| McDonald County | 2 | 1981, 1983 |
| Meadville | 2 | 1995, 2023 |
| Mercer | 1 | 2017 |
| Metro (St. Louis) | 2 | 2006, 2007 |
| Monroe City | 2 | 1998, 2000 |
| Montrose | 1 | 2010 |
| Mound City/Craig | 2 | 2016, 2018 |
| Mt. Vernon | 2 | 2010, 2012 |
| Neelyville | 1 | 2018 |
| New Bloomfield | 2 | 1986, 1988 |
| New Haven | 1 | 2002 |
| Nixa | 2 | 2000, 2009 |
| North Kansas City | 1 | 2019 |
| North Shelby | 1 | 1990 |
| Northeast (Cairo) | 1 | 2008 |
| Northeast Nodaway | 6 | 1973, 1976, 1977, 1978, 1979, 1982 |
| Norwood | 1 | 1994 |
| Notre Dame (Cape Girardeau) | 1 | 2002 |
| Notre Dame de Sion (Kansas City) | 2 | 2001, 2002 |
| Oak Grove | 1 | 1992 |
| Ozark | 2 | 2005, 2006 |
| Palmyra | 3 | 1981, 1984, 1986 |
| Paseo (Kansas City) | 1 | 1982 |
| Pembroke Hill (Kansas City) | 4 | 1995, 1999, 2005, 2006 |
| Penney (Hamilton) | 2 | 1977, 2008 |
| Perryville | 1 | 1986 |
| Platte County | 1 | 2009 |
| Principia (St. Louis) | 1 | 2026 |
| Purdy | 2 | 1981, 2011 |
| Raymore-Peculiar | 1 | 1993 |
| Republic | 3 | 1994, 2004, 2012 |
| Rock Bridge (Columbia) | 5 | 2008, 2012, 2013, 2014, 2015 |
| Rosary (St. Louis) | 1 | 1998 |
| Salisbury | 1 | 1989 |
| Scott County Central | 7 | 1982, 1984, 1985, 1987, 1991, 1992, 1993 |
| Silex | 1 | 2001 |
| Skyline (Urbana) | 8 | 1996, 1997, 2003, 2004, 2008, 2017, 2024, 2025 |
| South Harrison | 1 | 1980 |
| South Shelby | 1 | 1974 |
| Sparta | 1 | 2009 |
| St. Dominic (O'Fallon) | 1 | 2011 |
| St. Elizabeth | 1 | 2026 |
| St. Joseph's Academy (St. Louis) | 6 | 1975, 1991, 1992, 1993, 1994, 2004 |
| Stockton | 4 | 2001, 2003, 2004, 2011 |
| Strafford | 6 | 2016, 2017, 2018, 2019, 2020, 2026 |
| Tarkio | 1 | 1999 |
| Thayer | 1 | 2019 |
| Tipton | 2 | 2023, 2026 |
| Truman (Independence) | 1 | 1981 |
| Vashon (St. Louis) | 1 | 2023 |
| Visitation Academy (St. Louis) | 5 | 1978, 1979, 1980, 1984, 1987 |
| Walnut Grove | 6 | 2007, 2013, 2014, 2015, 2019, 2020 |
| Webb City | 1 | 2010 |
| Wellington-Napolean | 1 | 2022 |
| West Plains | 2 | 1998, 2022 |
| Wheeling | 1 | 1975 |
| Whitfield (St. Louis) | 1 | 2021 |

== See also ==
- List of Missouri state high school boys basketball championships
- List of Missouri state high school girls volleyball championships
- List of Missouri state high school baseball champions
- List of Missouri state high school football champions
- List of Missouri high schools by athletic conferences
