= List of Missouri state high school girls volleyball championships =

Below is a list of Missouri state high school girls' volleyball championships sanctioned by the Missouri State High School Activities Association since the organization began holding the tournaments in 1975.

== Championships ==
Season	Class	Champion	Record	Head coach	Score	Second place	Third place	Score	Fourth place	Venue
1975	—	Licking	20-1	Mary Menne	15–08, 15-06	Central (Park Hills)	William Chrisman	10–15, 15–05, 15-03	Branson	Missouri State University, Springfield
1976	—	Incarnate Word Academy	20-2	Jane Schreiber	15-05, 14–16, 15-09	Licking	Farmington	15-13, 15-13	Oak Park	Jefferson College, Hillsboro
1977	—	Raytown South	27-5-1	Loretta Sinnett	15-05, 14–15, 15-09	Licking	Ste. Genevieve	15-04, 08–15, 15-09	Rosati-Kain Academy	University of Missouri-Rolla, Rolla
1978	—	Lesterville	24-0-2	Stephanie Hanna	14-16, 15–10, 15-07	Central (Springfield)	Oak Park	15-09, 15-08	St. Charles	Meramec Community College, St. Louis
1979	1A-2A	Licking	20-2	Carole Garrison	15-10, 15-04	Advance	Sarcoxie	15-08, 05–15, 15-13	Santa Fe	Missouri State University, Springfield
1979	3A	Ste. Genevieve	30-0-1	Peggy J. Johnson	15-07, 15-10	Archbishop O'Hara	Rosati-Kain Academy	15-04, 15-11	Ozark	Missouri State University, Springfield
1979	4A	Truman	25-4-2	Chuck Harris	15-07, 15-05	Hickman Mills	McCluer North	15-13, 15-08	Hillsboro	Missouri State University, Springfield
1980	1A-2A	Valle Catholic	21-8-1	Mary Rosenquist	15-06, 15-13	Santa Fe	Sarcoxie	15-05, 15-07	Leopold	Waynesville High School, Waynesville
1980	3A	Ste. Genevieve	26-1-1	Peggy J. Johnson	15-08, 15-05	Rosati-Kain Academy	Archbishop O'Hara	15-12, 15-03	Willard	Avila College, Kansas City
1980	4A	Truman	23-3-1	Chuck Harris	15-13, 15-05	Hickman Mills	McCluer North	15-12, 15-12	Farmington	Avila College, Kansas City
1981	1A-2A	Eminence	24-2	Jim Keeling	15-10, 15-05	Sarcoxie	Santa Fe	15-06, 11–15, 15-11	Leopold	Hickman Mills High School, Kansas City
1981	3A	Willard	21-3-1	Dianne Cline	08-15, 15–05, 15-10	Festus	St. Mary's (Independence)	04-15, 15–08, 15-08	Cor Jesu Academy	Hickman Mills High School, Kansas City
1981	4A	William Chrisman	21-8	Billie Wilson	14-16, 15–06, 15-03	Hickman Mills	Affton	15-11, 15-08	Pattonville	Hickman Mills High School, Kansas City
1982	1A-2A	Santa Fe	27-0	Jerry MacLean	15-13, 15-12	Eminence	Sarcoxie	15-04, 04–15, 15-13	Leopold	Hickman Mills High School, Kansas City
1982	3A	Incarnate Word Academy	29-1	Teri Clemens	06-15, 15–03, 15-05	Hillsboro	Raymore-Peculiar	17-15, 13–15, 15-09	Salem	Hickman Mills High School, Kansas City
1982	4A	Hazelwood East	23-3-2	Nancy Ames	09-15, 15–10, 15-13	Kickapoo	Oak Park	10-15, 15–02, 15-09	Bishop DuBourg	Hickman Mills High School, Kansas City
1983	1A	Santa Fe	25-1-1	Charlie Bock	15-02, 15-10	Marionville	Advance	15-07, 16-14	Stover	Hickman Mills High School, Kansas City
1983	2A	Diamond	27-0	Bob Moore	15-03, 15-07	Bernie	Cole Camp	15-12, 13–15, 15-13	Crystal City	Hickman Mills High School, Kansas City
1983	3A	Incarnate Word Academy	29-3-1	Teri Clemens	16-14, 14–16, 15-08	Union	Hermann	15-11, 15-12	Willard	Hickman Mills High School, Kansas City
1983	4A	William Chrisman	24-5-2	Billie Wilson	15-12, 17-15	Hazelwood East	Kickapoo	08-15, 15–10, 16-14	Notre Dame (St. Louis)	Hickman Mills High School, Kansas City
1984	1A	Santa Fe	25-0	Charlie Bock	15-11, 15-13	Eminence	Stover	15-06, 15-08	Wheaton	Hickman Mills High School, Kansas City
1984	2A	Clearwater	25-3	Carmen Shaffer	15-11, 05–15, 15-05	Diamond	Crystal City	15-13, 13–15, 15-08	Knob Noster	Hickman Mills High School, Kansas City
1984	3A	Incarnate Word Academy	27-3	Teri Clemens	15-13, 05–15, 15-06	St. Francis Borgia	Warrensburg	15-02, 15-13	Mountain Grove	Hickman Mills High School, Kansas City
1984	4A	West Plains	27-1-1	Trish Gilliam	15-13, 05–15, 15-06	Truman	Washington	15-12, 15-00	Hazelwood Central	Hickman Mills High School, Kansas City
1985	1A	Santa Fe	22-0	Charlie Bock	15-07, 15-09	Eminence	Wheaton	11-15, 15–09, 15-04	New Haven	Kickapoo High School, Springfield
1985	2A	Diamond	25-0	Dale Shrum	15-03, 15-07	Knob Noster	Crystal City	15-11, 06–15, 16-14	Valle Catholic	Kickapoo High School, Springfield
1985	3A	Incarnate Word Academy	26-5	Karen Piedmonte	15-06, 11–15, 15-12	Ste. Genevieve	Warrensburg	12-15, 15–13, 15-06	Mountain Grove	Kickapoo High School, Springfield
1985	4A	West Plains	24-3-1	Trish Gilliam	15-11, 15-07	Washington	Oak Park	15-09, 15-03	St. Joseph's Academy	Kickapoo High School, Springfield
1986	1A	Santa Fe	24-1	Charlie Bock	08-15, 15–06, 15-11	Lesterville	Wheaton	15-07, 09–15, 15-12	Lutheran (Kansas City)	Parkway South High School, Ballwin
1986	2A	Hermann	19-6	Linda Birk	07-15, 15–06, 15-13	Diamond	Woodland	13-15, 15–07, 15-10	Versailles	Parkway South High School, Ballwin
1986	3A	Incarnate Word Academy	27-3-1	Karen Piedmonte	15-12, 10–15, 15-10	Union	Eldon	15-08, 15-03	Salem	Parkway South High School, Ballwin
1986	4A	West Plains	26-0	Trish Gilliam	15-05, 15-09	St. Joseph's Academy	Truman	15-10, 15-02	Washington	Parkway South High School, Ballwin
1987	1A	Santa Fe	27-4-2	Charlie Bock	15-02, 15-12	Wheaton	St. Vincent	15-02, 15-07	Archie	Hickman Mills High School, Kansas City
1987	2A	Clearwater	27-0	Carmen Shaffer	15-08, 15-11	Diamond	St. Mary's (Independence)	15-13, 09–15, 15-06	Crystal City	Hickman Mills High School, Kansas City
1987	3A	St. Francis Borgia	29-2-1	Mike Tyree	15-11, 15-11	Duchesne	Mountain Grove	15-07, 15-11	Eldon	Hickman Mills High School, Kansas City
1987	4A	West Plains	33-0	Trish Gilliam	15-10, 16-14	Kirkwood	Park Hill	15-09, 15-02	Washington	Hickman Mills High School, Kansas City
1988	1A	Lesterville	29-3	Carole Garrison	15-09, 15-12	Green Ridge	Purdy	15-06, 15-10	Archie	Multipurpose Building, UCM, Warrensburg
1988	2A	Clearwater	30-1	Carmen Shaffer	15-05, 15-07	Hermann	Diamond	15-12, 14–16, 15-05	St. Mary's (Independence)	Multipurpose Building, UCM, Warrensburg
1988	3A	St. Francis Borgia	31-1	Mike Tyree	15-05, 15-08	Eldon	Duchesne	15-02, 15-05	Mountain Grove	Multipurpose Building, UCM, Warrensburg
1988	4A	Park Hill	29-5-2	Debbie Fay	12-15, 15–05, 15-11	Kirkwood	Washington	15-01, 13–15, 15-12	Joplin	Multipurpose Building, UCM, Warrensburg
1989	1A	Valle Catholic	23-13-1	Nancy Fischer	10-15, 15–01, 15-10	Green Ridge	Purdy	15-05, 15-08	Adrian	Multipurpose Building, UCM, Warrensburg
1989	2A	Clearwater	26-4-2	Carmen Shaffer	15-09, 03–15, 15-10	Hermann	Springfield Catholic	15-03, 16-14	Cole Camp	Multipurpose Building, UCM, Warrensburg
1989	3A	St. Francis Borgia	33-0	Mike Tyree	15-06, 15-07	Duchesne	Eldon	16-14, 07–15, 15-07	Monett	Multipurpose Building, UCM, Warrensburg
1989	4A	Park Hill	35-2-1	Debbie Fay	15-13, 15-06	Ursuline Academy	Hillsboro	15-03, 10–15, 15-06	Joplin	Multipurpose Building, UCM, Warrensburg
1990	1A	Zalma	30-2	Carl D. Ritter, Jr.	15-04, 10–15, 15-13	Osceola	Santa Fe	15-07, 15-13	Lockwood	Multipurpose Building, UCM, Warrensburg
1990	2A	Hermann	31-3	Linda Birk	15-05, 05–15, 15-09	Springfield Catholic	Bernie	15-07, 11–15, 15-03	Versailles	Multipurpose Building, UCM, Warrensburg
1990	3A	St. Francis Borgia	31-6	Mike Tyree	15-10, 15-04	Duchesne	Eldon	15-09, 15-07	Monett	Multipurpose Building, UCM, Warrensburg
1990	4A	St. Joseph's Academy	31-2-2	Karen Elmore	06-15, 15–10, 15-08	Park Hill	West Plains	15-03, 10–15, 15-06	Incarnate Word Academy	Multipurpose Building, UCM, Warrensburg
1991	1A	New Haven	28-4-2	Dennis Carey	15-06, 15-11	Zalma	Lockwood	15-10, 15-05	Nodaway-Holt	Multipurpose Building, UCM, Warrensburg
1991	2A	Hermann	34-3	Linda Birk	16-14, 15-5	Diamond	Bernie	15-10, 15-12	St. Pius X (Kansas City)	Multipurpose Building, UCM, Warrensburg
1991	3A	Eldon	30-3-4	Ann Luetkemeyer	12-15, 15–11, 15-07	St. Francis Borgia	Houston	15-12, 10–15, 15-11	Montgomery County	Multipurpose Building, UCM, Warrensburg
1991	4A	St. Joseph's Academy	37-0	Karen Elmore	15-08, 15-09	Incarnate Word Academy	West Plains	15-10, 05–15, 15-11	Park Hill	Multipurpose Building, UCM, Warrensburg
1992	1A	New Haven	28-4-2	Dennis Carey	15-05, 10–15, 15-13	Zalma	Purdy	15-13, 15-02	Nodaway-Holt	Multipurpose Building, UCM, Warrensburg
1992	2A	Bloomfield	34-0	Barbara Dalton	15-13, 15-05	Versailles	Mark Twain	06-15, 15–09, 15-09	Lamar	Multipurpose Building, UCM, Warrensburg
1992	3A	St. Francis Borgia	30-5-3	Mike Tyree	15-06, 15-03	Houston	Eldon	15-12, 15-06	Duchesne	Multipurpose Building, UCM, Warrensburg
1992	4A	St. Joseph's Academy	37-0	Karen Elmore	15-06, 15-06	Park Hill	Cor Jesu Academy	15-08, 15-06	Jefferson City	Multipurpose Building, UCM, Warrensburg
1993	1A	Leopold	29-6	Greg Nenninger	13-15, 15–11, 15-12	Purdy	Osceola	15-11, 15-07	Rock Port	Multipurpose Building, UCM, Warrensburg
1993	2A	Hermann	22-13-1	Linda Birk	15-11, 15-11	Cole Camp	Woodland	15-09, 15-12	Strafford	Multipurpose Building, UCM, Warrensburg
1993	3A	St. Francis Borgia	33-3	Mike Tyree	15-11, 15-05	Eldon	Salem	15-03, 17–19, 15-10	Rosati-Kain Academy	Multipurpose Building, UCM, Warrensburg
1993	4A	St. Joseph's Academy	34-0	Karen Elmore	15-07, 15-04	Incarnate Word Academy	Jefferson City	15-09, 15-10	Park Hill	Multipurpose Building, UCM, Warrensburg
1994	1A	Bernie	33-1	Bill Zoll	15-05, 15-05	Purdy	Osceola	15-13, 15-06	Midway	Multipurpose Building, UCM, Warrensburg
1994	2A	Woodland	28-4	Johnna Welter	12-15, 15–11, 15-05	St. Mary's	Hermann	15-08, 15-06	Sarcoxie	Multipurpose Building, UCM, Warrensburg
1994	3A	Incarnate Word Academy	29-5-1	Karen Piedmonte	07-15, 15–12, 15-13	Festus	Archbishop O'Hara	15-11, 15-05	Lamar	Multipurpose Building, UCM, Warrensburg
1994	4A	Pacific	33-2-1	Lori Vanleer	15-05, 10–15, 15-07	Kickapoo	Ursuline Academy	15-13, 15-11	Blue Springs	Multipurpose Building, UCM, Warrensburg
1995	1A	Bernie	36-0	Bill Zoll	15-07, 13–15, 15-10	Purdy	Nodaway-Holt	15-07, 14–16, 15-08	Osceola	Multipurpose Building, UCM, Warrensburg
1995	2A	Holden	33-5	Julie Carver	15-07, 18-16	St. Pius X (Festus)	Hermann	15-06, 13–15, 15-13	Summersville	Multipurpose Building, UCM, Warrensburg
1995	3A	St. Francis Borgia	27-6-2	Mike Tyree	04-15, 15–09, 15-06	Salem	Incarnate Word Academy	15-10, 15-13	Warrensburg	Multipurpose Building, UCM, Warrensburg
1995	4A	Cor Jesu Academy	20-13-1	Terri Menghini	15-01, 15-12	Park Hill	Kirkwood	15-10, 15-01	Kickapoo	Multipurpose Building, UCM, Warrensburg
1996	1A	Bell City	33-3-2	Carl D. Ritter, Sr.	15-10, 15-08	New Haven	Wheaton	15-10, 15-05	Crest Ridge	Multipurpose Building, UCM, Warrensburg
1996	2A	Bernie	37-1-1	Bill Zoll	16-14, 17-15	Diamond	Hermann	15-11, 15-10	Cole Camp	Multipurpose Building, UCM, Warrensburg
1996	3A	Salem	37-2	Stephanie Bates	13-15, 15–07, 15-10	Bishop DuBourg	Marshfield	15-02, 15-11	Warrensburg	Multipurpose Building, UCM, Warrensburg
1996	4A	Kirkwood	32-2	Keith Price	15-06, 15-06	Park Hill	Incarnate Word Academy	15-02, 15-04	Lebanon	Multipurpose Building, UCM, Warrensburg
1997	1A	Leopold	28-4-2	Greg Nenninger	08-15, 15–3, 15-13	Smithton	Verona	15-11, 15-13	Crest Ridge	Multipurpose Building, UCM, Warrensburg
1997	2A	Hermann	33-3-2	Linda Birk	15-05, 15-08	Bernie	St. Mary's	15-12, 15-08	Strafford	Multipurpose Building, UCM, Warrensburg
1997	3A	Bishop DuBourg	34-4-1	Mark Hacker	15-09, 15-04	Archbishop O'Hara	Festus	15-13, 15-11	Nixa	Multipurpose Building, UCM, Warrensburg
1997	4A	Park Hill	33-5-4	Debbie Fay	15-07, 15-07	St. Joseph's Academy	Incarnate Word Academy	15-11, 15-13	Washington	Multipurpose Building, UCM, Warrensburg
1998	1A	Bernie	39-1-2	Bill Zoll	11-15, 15–12, 15-05	Santa Fe	Verona	17-15, 15-03	La Monte	Multipurpose Building, UCM, Warrensburg
1998	2A	East Newton	32-6-3	Beverly Goff	15-10, 12–15, 15-13	El Dorado Springs	Cole Camp	15-06, 15-05	Woodland	Multipurpose Building, UCM, Warrensburg
1998	3A	Bishop DuBourg	34-5-2	Tom Spiess	15-10, 15-13	Incarnate Word Academy	St. Teresa's Academy	15-02, 15-10	Marshfield	Multipurpose Building, UCM, Warrensburg
1998	4A	St. Joseph's Academy	34-1-1	Karen Davis	15-11, 15-07	Washington	Lee's Summit	10-15, 15–09, 15-06	Fort Zumwalt South	Multipurpose Building, UCM, Warrensburg
1999	1A	Bernie	36-2-2	Bill Zoll	16-14, 15-11	New Haven	Thomas Jefferson (St. Louis)	15-12, 15-07	Fairfax	Multipurpose Building, UCM, Warrensburg
1999	2A	El Dorado Springs	35-1-3	Becky Lipasek	15-10, 15-04	Hermann	Woodland	15-10, 15-11	Spokane	Multipurpose Building, UCM, Warrensburg
1999	3A	Incarnate Word Academy	31-8-3	Bridget Timoney	16-14, 15-04	St. Francis Borgia	Notre Dame de Sion	15-13, 15-12	Nixa	Multipurpose Building, UCM, Warrensburg
1999	4A	St. Joseph's Academy	31-2-2	Karen Davis	15-04, 17-15	Washington	Blue Springs	15-11, 15-10	St. Charles	Multipurpose Building, UCM, Warrensburg
2000	1	New Haven	21-12-3	Julie Gerdes	15-11, 15-06	Winona	Thomas Jefferson (St. Louis)	15-06, 15-10	Santa Fe	Multipurpose Building, UCM, Warrensburg
2000	2	Hermann	32-8	Linda Birk	15-10, 15-10	El Dorado Springs	Fair Grove	15-10, 15-08	Bismarck	Multipurpose Building, UCM, Warrensburg
2000	3	St. Francis Borgia	30-7	Mike Tyree	15-04, 15-09	Logan-Rogersville	Notre Dame de Sion	15-02, 15-01	Duchesne	Multipurpose Building, UCM, Warrensburg
2000	4	Cor Jesu Academy	33-6-1	Terri Menghini	15-11, 15-02	Incarnate Word Academy	Park Hill	15-08, 15-05	Jefferson City	Multipurpose Building, UCM, Warrensburg
2001	1	Winona	35-4-1	Francie McBride	15-06, 15-07	New Haven	Fairfax	08-15, 15–12, 15-13	Lockwood	Multipurpose Building, UCM, Warrensburg
2001	2	Hermann	30-7-3	Linda Birk	08-15, 15–12, 15-07	St. Pius X (Kansas City)	Fair Grove	15-13, 06–15, 15-03	Notre Dame (Cape Girardeau)	Multipurpose Building, UCM, Warrensburg
2001	3	Notre Dame de Sion	32-4-1	Mary Lile	15-08, 15-08	St. Francis Borgia	Logan-Rogersville	15-10, 15-09	Rosati-Kain Academy	Multipurpose Building, UCM, Warrensburg
2001	4	Cor Jesu Academy	35-5-1	Terri Menghini	11-15, 15–08, 15-05	Parkway West	Blue Springs	15-13, 15-13	Lebanon	Multipurpose Building, UCM, Warrensburg
2002	1	Leopold	34-2-3	Leanne Huffman	15-05, 15-05	Green Ridge	Eminence	08-15, 16–14, 15-06	Crest Ridge	Multipurpose Building, UCM, Warrensburg
2002	2	Hermann	37-2-1	Linda Birk	15-02, 15-05	Winona	Holden	15-04, 13–15, 15-04	Crystal City	Multipurpose Building, UCM, Warrensburg
2002	3	Archbishop O'Hara	36-4	Lori Hanaway	15-04, 15-06	Willard	St. Francis Borgia	08-15, 15–12, 15-09	Duchesne	Multipurpose Building, UCM, Warrensburg
2002	4	Cor Jesu Academy	29-11-1	Terri Menghini	12-15, 15–13, 15-07	Notre Dame de Sion	Incarnate Word Academy	15-05, 15-07	Glendale (Springfield)	Multipurpose Building, UCM, Warrensburg
2003	1	Bell City	26-9-1	Erin Hoffman	16-25, 25–23, 25-19	Lockwood	Eminence	25-21, 25-18	Crest Ridge	Multipurpose Building, UCM, Warrensburg
2003	2	Holden	35-3-1	Julie Carver	23-25, 25–21, 27-25	Lutheran (St. Charles County)	Valle Catholic	25-22, 10–25, 25-11	Winona	Multipurpose Building, UCM, Warrensburg
2003	3	Archbishop O'Hara	32-7-3	Lori Hanaway	30-28, 14–25, 25-21	Pleasant Hill	Duchesne	25-15, 25-21	Notre Dame (Cape Girardeau)	Multipurpose Building, UCM, Warrensburg
2003	4	Incarnate Word Academy	36-3-4	Lisa Oriet	25-17, 25-21	Park Hill South	Marquette	25-22, 22–25, 25-23	St. Joseph's Academy	Multipurpose Building, UCM, Warrensburg
2004	1	Lockwood	40-1	Cheryl Shores	25-10, 25-18	Gideon	Winona	25-21, 15–25, 25-16	Santa Fe	Multipurpose Building, UCM, Warrensburg
2004	2	Lutheran (St. Charles County)	34-4-1	Kathy Chapin	25-21, 25-10	Houston	Holden	26-24, 25-05	Valle Catholic	Multipurpose Building, UCM, Warrensburg
2004	3	St. Francis Borgia	34-4-3	Mike Tyree	25-18, 21–25, 25-15	Willard	Archbishop O'Hara	25-22, 25-23	Visitation Academy	Multipurpose Building, UCM, Warrensburg
2004	4	Incarnate Word Academy	38-0-2	Lisa Oriet	25-11, 25-16	St. Joseph's Academy	Marquette	25-20, 21–25, 25-22	Park Hill South	Multipurpose Building, UCM, Warrensburg
2005	1	New Haven	31-6-2	Jaime Hoener	25-12, 25-22	Santa Fe	Bell City	15-25, 26–24, 25-20	Winona	Multipurpose Building, UCM, Warrensburg
2005	2	El Dorado Springs	34-4-3	Becky Lipasek	25-16, 25-19	Lutheran (St. Charles County)	Spokane	17-25, 25–15, 26-24	Crystal City	Multipurpose Building, UCM, Warrensburg
2005	3	Archbishop O'Hara	31-5-4	Lori Hanaway	18-25, 25–17, 25-21	St. Francis Borgia	Republic	27-25, 11–25, 25-18	Visitation Academy	Multipurpose Building, UCM, Warrensburg
2005	4	Incarnate Word Academy	36-2-1	Lisa Oriet	24-26, 25–20, 25-18	St. Joseph's Academy	Park Hill South	25-21, 25-18	Washington	Multipurpose Building, UCM, Warrensburg
2006	1	Winona	33-3-5	Francie McBride	29-27, 20–25, 25-16	Santa Fe	Osceola	25-23, 25-15	Bell City	Multipurpose Building, UCM, Warrensburg
2006	2	Hermann	30-10	Linda Birk	25-15, 25-17	Crystal City	St. Mary's (Independence)	***	VACANT	Multipurpose Building, UCM, Warrensburg
2006	3	St. Pius X (Kansas City)	32-6-2	Inger Condit	25-19, 25-18	Lutheran (St. Charles County)	Reeds Spring	25-20, 18–25, 25-14	Lutheran South	Multipurpose Building, UCM, Warrensburg
2006	4	St. Teresa's Academy	36-4	Lori Hanaway	25-22, 25-16	St. Joseph's Academy	Washington	22-25, 25–17, 25-15	Parkway West	Multipurpose Building, UCM, Warrensburg
2007	1	Sacred Heart	31-2-4	David Fall	26-24, 25-21	Winona	Leopold	15-25, 25–12, 25-14	Osceola	Multipurpose Building, UCM, Warrensburg
2007	2	Stockton	30-4-3	Barry Wheeler	25-15, 25-22	St. Vincent	Hermann	19-25, 25–12, 25-22	Pierce City	Multipurpose Building, UCM, Warrensburg
2007	3	Archbishop O'Hara	24-12-1	Lori Hanaway	25-19, 25-19	Logan-Rogersville	St. Dominic	25-15, 25-14	Lutheran South	Multipurpose Building, UCM, Warrensburg
2007	4	Lee's Summit West	37-2-1	Mark Rice	17-25, 25–21, 25-23	Cor Jesu Academy	Lafayette (Wildwood)	25-22, 26-24	Incarnate Word Academy	Multipurpose Building, UCM, Warrensburg
2008	1	Sacred Heart	29-6-3	David Fall	21-25, 25–22, 25-23	Eminence	Bell City	25-20, 25-13	Santa Fe	Municipal Auditorium, Kansas City
2008	2	Hermann	28-8-2	Linda Lampkin	25-23, 25-19	Scott City	Ash Grove	22-25, 25–22, 25-18	Cole Camp	Municipal Auditorium, Kansas City
2008	3	Archbishop O'Hara	31-4-4	Lori Hanaway	25-22, 25-23	Westminster Christian Academy	Reeds Spring	25-15, 25-17	Ste. Genevieve	Municipal Auditorium, Kansas City
2008	4	St. Joseph's Academy	37-2-1	Karen Davis	25-21, 25-20	Lee's Summit West	Incarnate Word Academy	25-23, 23–25, 25-21	Glendale (Springfield)	Municipal Auditorium, Kansas City
2009	1	Lesterville	27-5-2	Betsy Middleton	25-23, 25-15	Winona	Osceola	27-25, 18–25, 25-21	Lutheran (Kansas City)	Municipal Auditorium, Kansas City
2009	2	Scott City	36-3-1	Haley A. Jennings	25-19, 25-22	Hermann	College Heights Christian	25-19, 29-27	Maryville	Municipal Auditorium, Kansas City
2009	3	Archbishop O'Hara	30-6-1	Lori Hanaway	25-16, 25-13	Villa Duchesne	Logan-Rogersville	25-18, 25-13	Notre Dame (Cape Girardeau)	Municipal Auditorium, Kansas City
2009	4	Ozark	34-3-3	Becky Justis	28-26, 22–25, 25-17	Blue Springs	Incarnate Word Academy	23-25, 25–17, 26-24	St. Joseph's Academy	Municipal Auditorium, Kansas City
2010	1	Valle Catholic	33-3-1	Nancy Fischer	25-23, 29-27	New Haven	Eminence	25-22, 25-20	St. Mary's (Independence)	Municipal Auditorium, Kansas City
2010	2	Hermann	34-4-3	Linda Lampkin	25-18, 25-20	St. Pius X (Festus)	St. Paul Lutheran (Concordia)	20-25, 25–20, 26-24	College Heights Christian	Municipal Auditorium, Kansas City
2010	3	Archbishop O'Hara	34-6	Lori Hanaway	25-13, 25-21	St. Francis Borgia	Logan-Rogersville	16-25, 25–15, 26-24	Notre Dame (Cape Girardeau)	Municipal Auditorium, Kansas City
2010	4	St. Joseph's Academy	31-7-2	Karen Davis	25-19, 31-29	Lee's Summit West	Ozark	25-17, 26–28, 25-14	Incarnate Word Academy	Municipal Auditorium, Kansas City
2011	1	Eminence	35-4-2	Shari Tune	25-16, 25-17	Valle Catholic	Liberal	25-23, 25-13	Santa Fe	Show-Me Center, SEMO, Cape Girardeau
2011	2	St. Pius X (Festus)	28-6-9	Karrie Hermann	27-25, 25-16	Fatima	Clever	19-25, 25–20, 25-20	St. Paul Lutheran (Concordia)	Show-Me Center, SEMO, Cape Girardeau
2011	3	Villa Duchesne	35-5-2	Shane Weber	25-21, 25-22	St. Pius X (Kansas City)	Lutheran South	12-25, 26–24, 25-23	Pleasant Hill	Show-Me Center, SEMO, Cape Girardeau
2011	4	Lafayette (Wildwood)	33-5-1	Steve Burkard	25-23, 24–26, 25-16	Lee's Summit West	Ozark	25-20, 21–25, 25-19	Francis Howell	Show-Me Center, SEMO, Cape Girardeau
2012	1	Winona	32-7-1	Francie McBride	25-21, 25-21	Bernie	Osceola	25-19, 28-26	Santa Fe	Show-Me Center, SEMO, Cape Girardeau
2012	2	Fatima	35-4-1	Mark Bockstruck	25-14, 25-19	St. Pius X (Festus)	Mountain Grove	25-22, 25-19	Bishop LeBlond	Show-Me Center, SEMO, Cape Girardeau
2012	3	Westminster Christian Academy	27-6-2	Tim Hall	25-16, 25-22	Pleasant Hill	St. Pius X (Kansas City)	25-15, 25-21	Perryville	Show-Me Center, SEMO, Cape Girardeau
2012	4	Lafayette (Wildwood)	40-0	Zach Young	26-24, 25-19	Lee's Summit West	Ozark	23-25, 25–13, 25-14	Francis Howell	Show-Me Center, SEMO, Cape Girardeau
2013	1	Winona	30-9-1	Francie McBride	25-20, 25-18	Leopold	Santa Fe	27-25, 25-20	Osceola	Show-Me Center, SEMO, Cape Girardeau
2013	2	Hermann	26-14	Linda Lampkin	25-22, 25-18	St. Pius X (Festus)	Lee's Summit Christian Academy	17-25, 25–22, 25-21	Fair Grove	Show-Me Center, SEMO, Cape Girardeau
2013	3	St. Francis Borgia	33-3-2	Brad Bruns	25-23, 25-21	Carl Junction	St. Pius X (Kansas City)	30-28, 25-14	Lutheran South	Show-Me Center, SEMO, Cape Girardeau
2013	4	Lafayette (Wildwood)	38-1-2	Zach Young	25-10, 25-13	Park Hill South	Ozark	25-15, 25-18	Marquette	Show-Me Center, SEMO, Cape Girardeau
2014	1	Winona	28-5-5	Francie McBride	22-25, 25–13, 25-20	St. Vincent	Santa Fe	19-25, 25–17, 25-22	New Haven	Show-Me Center, SEMO, Cape Girardeau
2014	2	Liberty (Mountain View)	39-3-1	Shari Tune	25-19, 20–25, 25-21	Fatima	St. Paul Lutheran (Concordia)	25-17, 25-17	Bloomfield	Show-Me Center, SEMO, Cape Girardeau
2014	3	Helias Catholic	43-0-1	David Harris	25-18, 18–25, 25-17	Villa Duchesne	St. Pius X (Festus)	25-20, 25-22	St. Pius X (Kansas City)	Show-Me Center, SEMO, Cape Girardeau
2014	4	Lafayette (Wildwood)	27-7-2	Zach Young	25-20, 25-20	St. Joseph's Academy	Ozark	09-25, 25–23, 25-15	Liberty	Show-Me Center, SEMO, Cape Girardeau
2015	1	Santa Fe	36-1-1	Kinsey Harms	28-26, 25-12	New Haven	Bernie	25-21, 25-22	Winona	Show-Me Center, SEMO, Cape Girardeau
2015	2	Lutheran (St. Charles County)	29-6-1	Sasa Vasiljevic	25-16, 25-20	Strafford	Bishop LeBlond	25-21, 25-15	Arcadia Valley	Show-Me Center, SEMO, Cape Girardeau
2015	3	Villa Duchesne	33-7-1	Shane Weber	25-17, 25-10	St. Pius X (Festus)	Pleasant Hill	25-22, 25-13	St. Pius X (Kansas City)	Show-Me Center, SEMO, Cape Girardeau
2015	4	Lafayette (Wildwood)	25-7-5	Zach Young	16-25, 25–19, 25-11	St. Teresa's Academy	Ozark	25-23, 25-23	St. Joseph's Academy	Show-Me Center, SEMO, Cape Girardeau
2016	1	Northland Christian	31-8-1	Brandy Tanner	25-23, 25-20	Valle Catholic	New Haven	25-16, 16–25, 29-27	Eminence	Show-Me Center, SEMO, Cape Girardeau
2016	2	St. Pius X (Festus)	36-4	Dustin Cutts	25-10, 25-18	Hermann	Liberty (Mountain View)	25-22, 25-11	St. Paul Lutheran (Concordia)	Show-Me Center, SEMO, Cape Girardeau
2016	3	Lutheran South	34-3-3	Carol Reinitz	25-23, 25-21	Pleasant Hill	St. Francis Borgia	25-23, 17–25, 25-21	Logan-Rogersville	Show-Me Center, SEMO, Cape Girardeau
2016	4	Lafayette (Wildwood)	33-6-1	Zach Young	20-25, 27–25, 25-21	Francis Howell	Ozark	25-22, 20–25, 25-21	St. Teresa's Academy	Show-Me Center, SEMO, Cape Girardeau
2017	1	Northland Christian	35-3-4	Brandy Tanner	25-21, 25-18	New Haven	Valle Catholic	25-15, 25-16	Winona	Show-Me Center, SEMO, Cape Girardeau
2017	2	St. Pius X (Festus)	28-8-1	Shannon Leftridge	23-25, 25–08, 25-22	Strafford	Hermann	25-17, 25-10	St. Michael the Archangel	Show-Me Center, SEMO, Cape Girardeau
2017	3	Helias Catholic	34-4-2	David Harris	25-17, 23–25, 25-15	Lutheran South	Pleasant Hill	25-22, 28-26	Incarnate Word Academy	Show-Me Center, SEMO, Cape Girardeau
2017	4	St. Joseph's Academy	34-3	Katie Richardson	25-20, 25-13	Ozark	St. Teresa's Academy	25-17, 23–25, 25-17	St. Dominic	Show-Me Center, SEMO, Cape Girardeau
2018	1	Advance	37-2-1	Erin Hoffman	25-12, 25-23	Calvary Lutheran	West Platte	25-22, 25-15	Billings	Show-Me Center, SEMO, Cape Girardeau
2018	2	Hermann	33-5-2	Linda Lampkin	25-21, 21–25, 25-17	Arcadia Valley	St. Michael the Archangel	25-22, 25-16	Liberty (Mountain View)	Show-Me Center, SEMO, Cape Girardeau
2018	3	Logan-Rogersville	38-2	Tammy Miller	25-16, 25-13	Lutheran South	St. Francis Borgia	25-18, 25-18	Pleasant Hill	Show-Me Center, SEMO, Cape Girardeau
2018	4	Eureka	31-8-3	Jodie Fowler	25-23, 25-23	Lafayette (Wildwood)	St. Teresa's Academy	25-14, 21–25, 25-23	Willard	Show-Me Center, SEMO, Cape Girardeau
2019	1	Advance	38-2	Erin Hoffman	25-11, 25-21	Santa Fe	Billings	25-12, 25-18	Calvary Lutheran	Show-Me Center, SEMO, Cape Girardeau
2019	2	Hermann	35-5	Phil Landolt	25-18, 25-19	St. Pius X (Festus)	Licking	25-13, 25-18	St. Paul Lutheran (Concordia)	Show-Me Center, SEMO, Cape Girardeau
2019	3	St. Francis Borgia	33-4-1	C.J. Steiger	25-15, 18–25, 25-20	Logan-Rogersville	St. Michael the Archangel	25-22, 25-22	Windsor (Imperial)	Show-Me Center, SEMO, Cape Girardeau
2019	4	Nixa	37-4-1	Annie Zimmerman	25-17, 25-22	Lafayette (Wildwood)	Liberty	28-26, 25-18	Francis Howell Central	Show-Me Center, SEMO, Cape Girardeau
2020	1	Advance	35-1-2	Erin Hoffman	25-13, 25–15, 18–25, 25-08	Lesterville	Midway	26-24, 25–15, 25-23	New Haven	Show-Me Center, SEMO, Cape Girardeau
2020	2	Living Word (O'Fallon) Christian	8-7	Kayla Hellebusch	25-22, 27–25, 22–25, 20–25, 19-17	Valle Catholic	Miller	25-16, 15–25, 25–19, 25-15	Lawson	Show-Me Center, SEMO, Cape Girardeau
2020	3	Maryville	22-2	Miranda Mizera	25-20, 25–21, 25-22	Central (Park Hills)	Hermann	25-11, 25–18, 25-12	Springfield Catholic	Show-Me Center, SEMO, Cape Girardeau
2020	4	Willard	31-3-1	Jamalee Hancock	25-08, 20–25, 25–09, 25-18	Parkway West	Platte County	25-21, 25–18, 25-19	Nerinx Hall	Show-Me Center, SEMO, Cape Girardeau
2020	5	Liberty North	24-0	Katie S. Dowden	26-24, 25–20, 25-16	Nixa	St. Francis Borgia	25-22, 24–26, 26–24, 25-21	St. Dominic	Show-Me Center, SEMO, Cape Girardeau
2021	1	Miller	34-3-1	Tamra Landers	25-15, 25–20, 25-18	Gideon	Santa Fe	25-21, 23–25, 25–10, 25-13	South Iron	Show-Me Center, SEMO, Cape Girardeau
2021	2	Hermann	31-5-1	Phil Landolt	25-18, 25–14, 25-17	Bishop LeBlond	Jefferson (Festus)	25-17, 25–19, 25-19	Skyline	Show-Me Center, SEMO, Cape Girardeau
2021	3	Blair Oaks	35-4	Megan Distler	25-17, 25–16, 25-18	Strafford	Valle Catholic	25-22, 25–14, 25-15	Notre Dame de Sion	Show-Me Center, SEMO, Cape Girardeau
2021	4	Westminster Christian Academy	26-8	Ben Briney	25-18, 25–23, 25-17	Logan-Rogersville	Pembroke Hill	25-21, 25–20, 25-17	Nerinx Hall	Show-Me Center, SEMO, Cape Girardeau
2021	5	Cor Jesu Academy	23-5-3	Tim Haffner	25-14, 25–18, 22–25, 25-23	Lee's Summit West	St. Dominic	25-22, 20–25, 23–25, 25–21, 15-10	Rock Bridge	Show-Me Center, SEMO, Cape Girardeau
2022	1	Advance	27-10	Erin Hoffman	11-25, 25–15, 21–25, 25–09, 15-12	Miller	Winona	25-13, 25–21, 25-12	Tarkio/Fairfax	Show-Me Center, SEMO, Cape Girardeau
2022	2	Jefferson (Festus)	32-5-1	Tara Fish	16-25, 25–23, 25–22, 25-19	Hermann	Strafford	25-15, 25–19, 26-24	East Buchanan	Show-Me Center, SEMO, Cape Girardeau
2022	3	Blair Oaks	33-3-1	Megan Distler	25-15, 25–08, 25-23	Pleasant Hill	Ste. Genevieve	25-17, 25–20, 22–25, 25-17	Eldon	Show-Me Center, SEMO, Cape Girardeau
2022	4	Westminster Christian Academy	32-2-5	Ben Briney	25-21, 17–25, 25–19, 25-23	Incarnate Word Academy	Platte County	25-23, 16–25, 22–25, 31–29, 15-11	Webb City	Show-Me Center, SEMO, Cape Girardeau
2022	5	Lafayette (Wildwood)	32-6	Zach Young	25-19, 24–26, 25–10, 25-17	Kickapoo	Liberty North	16-25, 25–16, 25–18, 25-18	St. Dominic	Show-Me Center, SEMO, Cape Girardeau
2023	1	Advance	35-3-3	Erin Hoffman	25-13, 25–13, 25-20	South Iron	Northwest Pettis County	25-13, 25–13, 25-10	Galena	Show-Me Center, SEMO, Cape Girardeau
2023	2	Fair Grove	35-1-2	Tonya Peck	22-25, 25–18, 17–25, 25–21, 15-05	Hermann	Bishop LeBlond	25-18, 18–25, 25–23, 25-20	Arcadia Valley	Show-Me Center, SEMO, Cape Girardeau
2023	3	Blair Oaks	31-5-1	Danielle Lueckenhoff	19-25, 20–25, 25–22, 25–18, 15-08	Ursuline Academy	Pleasant Hill	25-20, 25–21, 25-20	Clever	Show-Me Center, SEMO, Cape Girardeau
2023	4	Incarnate Word Academy	31-10-1	Shane Weber	25-15, 25–23, 25-20	St. Pius X (Festus)	Jefferson City	23-25, 25–18, 25–18, 25-19	St. Michael the Archangel	Show-Me Center, SEMO, Cape Girardeau
2023	5	Lafayette (Wildwood)	36-2	Zach Young	25-22, 25–18, 25-16	Francis Howell	Lee's Summit West	25-23, 25–20, 21–25, 16–25, 15-13	Kickapoo	Show-Me Center, SEMO, Cape Girardeau
2024	1	Winona	34-3-2	Jordan Denning	25-15, 25–22, 25-16	Advance	Jasper	19-25, 25-21, 25-09, 25-21	Santa Fe	Show-Me Center, SEMO, Cape Girardeau
2024	2	Fair Grove	41-0	Tonya Peck	25-19, 25–20, 25-17	Bishop LeBlond	St. Vincent	14-25, 21-25, 25-19, 25-22, 15-10	Hermann	Show-Me Center, SEMO, Cape Girardeau
2024	3	Potosi	27-9-1	Ashley Matthews	25-19, 25–21, 25-20	Logan-Rogersville	Odessa	25-12, 25-15, 25-22	Eldon	Show-Me Center, SEMO, Cape Girardeau
2024	4	St. Pius X (Festus)	37-2-1	Shannon Leftridge	14-25, 25-21, 25-16, 25-22	Jefferson City	Lutheran (St. Charles County)	25-11, 18-25, 25-20, 25-17	Platte County	Show-Me Center, SEMO, Cape Girardeau
2024	5	Lafayette (Wildwood)	32-5	Zach Young	26-24, 25-13, 25-13	Ozark	Liberty	25-14, 25-17, 25-17	Francis Howell	Show-Me Center, SEMO, Cape Girardeau
2025	1	Bismarck	39-3	Chelsea Hennes	17-25, 13-25, 27-25, 25-14, 15-10	Winona	Northland Christian	25-11, 25-17, 25-19	Liberal	St. Joseph Civic Center, Missouri Western, St. Joseph
2025	2	St. Vincent	28-6-2	Leeah Radil	25-18, 27-25, 25-23	Hermann	New Covenant Academy	22-25, 25-16, 25-23, 23-25, 15-12	East Buchanan	St. Joseph Civic Center, Missouri Western, St. Joseph
2025	3	Helias Catholic	36-1-1	David Harris	25-12, 25-21, 25-18	Mount Vernon	Oak Grove	25-08, 25-22, 25-22	Saxony Lutheran	St. Joseph Civic Center, Missouri Western, St. Joseph
2025	4	St. Michael the Archangel	32-7	Lori Hanaway	23-25, 25-23, 25-20, 27-25	St. Pius X (Festus)	Hannibal	19-25, 16-25, 25-22, 25-19, 15-12	Webb City	St. Joseph Civic Center, Missouri Western, St. Joseph
2025	5	Lafayette (Wildwood)	40-1	Zach Young	22-25, 25-14, 25-19, 25-21	Lee's Summit North	Nixa	25-21, 25-17, 25-18	Incarnate Word Academy	St. Joseph Civic Center, Missouri Western, St. Joseph
2026	1	Rock Port	37-4-1	Stephanie Parsons	25-19, 24-26, 27-25, 25-27, 15-11	Valle Catholic	Winona	25-12, 13-25, 23-25, 26-24, 15-11	Billings	St. Joseph Civic Center, Missouri Western, St. Joseph
2026	2	New Covenant Academy	35-1-1	Chenille Gaumer	25-18, 25-22, 25-17	Woodland	Liberty (Mountain View)	25-23, 25-18, 25-19	Mid-Buchanan	St. Joseph Civic Center, Missouri Western, St. Joseph
2026	3	Oak Grove	32-3	Kate Sollars	25-12, 25-19, 25-09	St. Francis Borgia	Potosi	25-20, 20-25, 25-10, 25-19	Nevada	St. Joseph Civic Center, Missouri Western, St. Joseph
2026	4	St. Dominic	25-9	Courtney Bland	25-13, 25-19, 23-25, 27-25	Helias Catholic	Smithville	15-25, 25-23, 25-23, 25-20	Rockwood Summit	St. Joseph Civic Center, Missouri Western, St. Joseph
2026	5	Lafayette (Wildwood)	35-5	Zach Young	25-27, 15-25, 27-25, 29-27, 15-09	Lee's Summit West	Lee's Summit North	25-22, 25-23, 25-21	Incarnate Word Academy	St. Joseph Civic Center, Missouri Western, St. Joseph

- Strafford forfeited its participation in the 2007–2008 MSHSAA State Volleyball Championships due to the use of an ineligible player. St. Mary's (Independence)), which lost to Strafford 25–23, 25-12 for third place on the court, is officially recognized as the third-place finisher, and the fourth-place position is hereby recognized as historically vacant.
- MSHSAA implemented the best-of-five format during the 2020–2021 season; prior to this, it was best-of-three. MSHSAA also added another class (Class 5) the same season. During the same 2020–2021 season, some championship teams' records above are lower than normal; this is due to an unusually high number of games and tournaments that had to be canceled during the regular season due to the coronavirus global pandemic.

== Number of state championships by school ==
The following table lists the number of championships (first-place finishes) that each school has won in the MSHSAA state tournament (updated to reflect the 2026–2027 season results).

School	Mascot	City	Type	Number of titles	County
Advance	Lady Hornets	Advance	Public	5	Stoddard
Archbishop O’Hara	Lady Celtics	Kansas City	Private	6	Jackson
Bell City	Lady Cubs	Bell City	Public	2	Stoddard
Bernie	Lady Mules	Bernie	Public	5	Stoddard
Bishop DuBourg	Lady Cavaliers	St. Louis	Private	2	St. Louis (City)
Bismarck	Lady Indians	Bismarck	Public	1	St. Francois
Blair Oaks	Lady Falcons	Jefferson City	Public	3	Cole
Bloomfield	Lady Wildcats	Bloomfield	Public	1	Stoddard
Clearwater	Lady Tigers	Piedmont	Public	4	Wayne
Cor Jesu Academy	Lady Chargers	Affton	Private	5	St. Louis (County)
Diamond	Lady Wildcats	Diamond	Public	2	Newton
East Newton	Lady Patriots	Granby	Public	1	Newton
El Dorado Springs	Lady Bulldogs	El Dorado Springs	Public	2	Cedar
Eldon	Lady Mustangs	Eldon	Public	1	Miller
Eminence	Lady Redwings	Eminence	Public	2	Shannon
Eureka	Lady Wildcats	Eureka	Public	1	St. Louis (County)
Fair Grove	Lady Eagles	Fair Grove	Public	2	Greene
Fatima	Lady Comets	Westphalia	Public	1	Osage
Hazelwood East	Lady Spartans	St. Louis	Public	1	St. Louis (County)
Helias Catholic	Lady Crusaders	Jefferson City	Private	3	Cole
Hermann	Lady Bearcats	Hermann	Public	15	Gasconade
Holden	Lady Eagles	Holden	Public	2	Johnson
Incarnate Word Academy	Lady Red Knights	Bel-Nor	Private	12	St. Louis (County)
Jefferson	Lady Blue Jays	Festus	Public	1	Jefferson
Kirkwood	Lady Pioneers	Kirkwood	Public	1	St. Louis (County)
Lafayette	Lady Lancers	Wildwood	Public	11	St. Louis (County)
Lee's Summit West	Lady Titans	Lee's Summit	Public	1	Jackson
Leopold	Lady Wildcats	Leopold	Public	3	Bollinger
Lesterville	Lady Bearcats	Lesterville	Public	2	Reynolds
Liberty	Lady Eagles	Mountain View	Public	1	Howell
Liberty North	Lady Eagles	Liberty	Public	1	Clay
Licking	Lady Wildcats	Licking	Public	2	Texas
Living Word Christian	Lady Eagles	O'Fallon	Private	1	St. Charles
Lockwood	Lady Tigers	Lockwood	Public	1	Dade
Logan-Rogersville	Lady Wildcats	Rogersville	Public	1	Greene
Lutheran (St. Charles County)	Lady Cougars	St. Peters	Private	2	St. Charles
Lutheran South	Lady Lancers	St. Louis	Private	1	St. Louis (County)
Maryville	Lady Spoofhounds	Maryville	Public	1	Nodaway
Miller	Lady Cardinals	Miller	Public	1	Lawrence
New Covenant Academy	Lady Warriors	Springfield	Private	1	Greene
New Haven	Lady Shamrocks	New Haven	Public	4	Franklin
Nixa	Lady Eagles	Nixa	Public	1	Christian
Northland Christian School	Lady Trailblazers	Kansas City	Private	2	Platte
Notre Dame de Sion	Lady Storm	Kansas City	Private	1	Jackson
Oak Grove	Lady Panthers	Oak Grove	Public	1	Jackson
Pacific	Lady Indians	Pacific	Public	1	Franklin
Park Hill	Lady Trojans	Kansas City	Public	3	Platte
Potosi	Lady Trojans	Potosi	Public	1	Washington
Raytown South	Lady Cardinals	Raytown	Public	1	Jackson
Rock Port	Lady Blue Jays	Rock Port	Public	1	Atchison
Rosati-Kain Academy	Lady Kougars	St. Louis	Private	1	St. Louis (County)
Sacred Heart	Lady Gremlins	Sedalia	Private	2	Pettis
Salem	Lady Tigers	Salem	Public	1	Dent
Santa Fe	Lady Chiefs	Alma	Public	7	Lafayette
Scott City	Lady Rams	Scott City	Public	1	Scott
St. Dominic	Lady Crusaders	O'Fallon	Private	1	St. Louis (County)
St. Francis Borgia	Lady Knights	Washington	Private	11	Franklin
St. Joseph's Academy	Lady Angels	Frontenac	Private	9	St. Louis (County)
St. Michael the Archangel	Lady Guardians	Lee's Summit	Private	1	Jackson
St. Pius X	Lady Lancers	Festus	Private	4	Jefferson
St. Pius X	Lady Warriors	Kansas City	Private	1	Clay
St. Teresa's Academy	Lady Stars	Kansas City	Private	1	Jackson
St. Vincent	Lady Indians	Perryville	Private	1	Perry
Ste. Genevieve	Lady Dragons	Ste. Genevieve	Public	2	Ste. Genevieve
Stockton	Lady Tigers	Stockton	Public	1	Cedar
Truman	Lady Patriots	Independence	Public	2	Jackson
Valle Catholic	Lady Warriors	Ste. Genevieve	Private	2	Ste. Genevieve
Villa Duchesne	Lady Saints	Frontenac	Private	2	St. Louis (County)
Westminster Christian Academy	Lady Wildcats	Town & Country	Private	3	St. Louis (County)
West Plains	Lady Zizzers	West Plains	Public	4	Howell
Willard	Lady Tigers	Willard	Public	2	Greene
William Chrisman	Lady Bears	Independence	Public	2	Jackson
Winona	Lady Wildcats	Winona	Public	6	Shannon
Woodland	Lady Cardinals	Marble Hill	Public	1	Bollinger
Zalma	Lady Bulldogs	Zalma	Public	1	Bollinger

== Number of district championships by school ==
The following table lists the number of district championship titles (first-place finishes) that each school has won since the MSHSAA was formed.

The numbers are current and have been updated to reflect the district titles from the ongoing 2026–2027 season (updated October 28, 2026).

School	Number of titles		
Incarnate Word Academy (Bel Nor)	40		
Santa Fe (Alma)	39		
Hermann	39		
New Haven	35		
St. Francis Borgia	34		
Archbishop O'Hara	26		
Duchesne	31		
Rosati-Kain	30		
Cor Jesu Academy (St. Louis)	33		
Leopold	25		
St. Teresa's Academy	31		
Lockwood	27		
Farmington	29		
Bernie	24		
Crystal City	21		
Dexter	24		
Osceola	29		
St. Joseph's Academy (St. Louis)	27		
Valle Catholic	29		
Cole Camp	23		
Eminence	21		
Festus	20		
Holden	20		
William Chrisman	18		
Kickapoo	19		
Lutheran South	23		
South Pemiscot	17		
Blue Springs	21		
St. Mary's (Independence)	16		
Warrensburg	16		
Washington	16		
West Platte	19		
Bishop LeBlond	24		
Gideon	22		
Jefferson City	20		
Licking	19		
Oak Park	16		
Ozark	22		
St. Charles	15		
St. Pius X (Kansas City)	23		
Clever	20		
David H. Hickman	16		
El Dorado Springs	19		
Eldon	17		
Lee's Summit	17		
Ste. Genevieve	19		
Versailles	14		
Willard	17		
Advance	22		
McCluer North	15		
Notre Dame (Cape Girardeau)	17		
Purdy	14		
Spokane	13		
Bishop DuBourg	13		
Clearwater	13		
Green Ridge	16		
Hazelwood West	12		
Logan-Rogersville	21		
Park Hill	16		
Strafford	21		
Truman	12		
Westminster Christian Academy	15		
Wheaton	12		
Winona	20		
Archie	14		
Bismarck	16		
Bloomfield	17		
Fort Zumwalt South	11		
Lebanon	12		
Monett	11		
Nixa	15		
Sparta	12		
Appleton City	12		
Bell City	11		
Belle	11		
Hazelwood Central	11		
Helias Catholic	19		
Liberty (Mountain View)	21		
Midway	15		
Park Hill South	12		
Crest Ridge	11		
Diamond	14		
Fair Grove	12		
Fatima	16		
Joplin	10*		
Montgomery County	9		
Plato	9		
Platte County	14		
Sarcoxie	13		
St. Pius X (Festus)	19		
Trinity Catholic	12*		
West Plains	11		
Billings	16		
Caruthersville	8		
East Newton	8		
Fairfax	11*		
Fort Osage	8		
Greenfield	10		
Houston	9		
Lafayette (Wildwood)	20		
Lesterville	15		
Lutheran (St. Charles County)	16		
Marshfield	9		
Mountain Grove	11		
Scott City	9		
St. Dominic	15		
Stockton	9		
Stover	14		
Woodland	11		
Ash Grove	7		
Brentwood	8		
Camdenton	8		
Carl Junction	11		
DeSoto	7		
Excelsior Springs	8		
Francis Howell	15		
Hickman Mills	7		
Lamar	7		
Lee's Summit West	15		
Nodaway-Holt	7		
Orchard Farm	9		
Pattonville	8		
Pleasant Hill	18		
Rich Hill	9		
Sacred Heart	11		
St. Vincent	14		
Steelville	8		
Tarkio	12*		
Visitation Academy	10		
The Whitfield School	11		
Boonville	8		
Central (Park Hills)	7		
Hayti	6		
Hillcrest	6		
Kearney	7		
Ladue Horton Watkins	7		
Lexington	7		
Liberal	9		
Lutheran (Kansas City)	8		
Notre Dame de Sion	10		
Reeds Spring	7		
Republic	7		
Rock Bridge	11		
Savannah	12		
University City	6		
Bayless	5		
Cameron	6		
Cassville	5		
Glendale (Springfield)	5		
Hazelwood East	5		
Hillsboro	6		
Jackson	13		
Kirkwood	6		
Lafayette County	9		
La Monte	5		
Lee's Summit Christian Academy	8		
Marionville	5		
Marquette	7		
Miller	14		
Mound City	6		
Nerinx Hall	7		
Parkway West	9		
Perryville	6		
Rock Port	12		
St. Paul Lutheran (Concordia)	11		
Ursuline Academy	9		
Affton	4		
California	8		
New Heights Christian Academy	7*		
Fox	4		
Fulton	5		
Holcomb	10		
Jasper	8		
Knob Noster	4		
Lee's Summit North	6		
Lone Jack	6		
Lutheran North	7		
North Kansas City	4		
Pacific	5		
Parkview	4		
Parkway Central	6		
Pierce City	4		
Puxico	4		
South Holt	4		
Springfield Catholic	7		
St. Elizabeth's Academy	4		
St. Joseph Christian School	7		
Summersville	7		
Troy Buchanan	4		
Villa Duchesne	8		
Wellington-Napoleon	5		
Windsor (Imperial)	5		
Adrian	10		
Aurora	7		
Blair Oaks	7		
Branson	4		
Butler	3		
Central (Cape Girardeau)	3		
Chamois	3		
Clarkton	5		
Crane	5		
Fort Zumwalt West	3		
Francis Howell Central	6		
Francis Howell North	3		
Grain Valley	4		
Grandview	3		
Hannibal	6		
Harrisonville	4		
Herculaneum	3		
John Burroughs School	7		
John F. Kennedy	3		
Lawson	8		
Liberty	9		
Lincoln	3		
Lindbergh	3		
Meadow Heights	4		
Mehlville	3		
Miami	3		
Mount Vernon	7		
Nevada	6		
Notre Dame (St. Louis)	5		
Oak Grove	5		
Oak Ridge	1		
Oakville	5		
Orrick	3		
Osage	3		
Parkway North	3		
The Principia	5		
Raymore-Peculiar	4		
Raytown South	3		
Risco	3		
Roosevelt	3		
Seymour	3		
Silex	3		
South Iron	5		
Thomas Jefferson Independent Day School	4		
Union	3		
Verona	3		
Viburnum	3		
Winnetonka	3		
Zalma	3		
Blue Springs South	7		
Carrollton	4		
Carthage	3		
Cleveland Junior Naval Academy	2		
Clinton	2		
Doniphan	2		
East Buchanan	6		
Everton	2		
Fordland	2		
Hurley	3		
Maplewood-Richmond Heights	5		
Marshall	2		
Maryville	4		
Miller Career Academy	3		
Niangua	2		
North Pemiscot	4		
Northland Christian School	5		
Northwest (Hughesville)	3		
Odessa	8		
Potosi	5		
Richland (Essex)	2		
Sherwood	2		
Smith-Cotton	3		
Smithton	2		
Southern Reynolds (Ellington)	3		
St. Charles West	2		
Twin Rivers	4		
Valley Park	2		
Warsaw	2		
Webb City	8		
Willow Springs	3		
Winfield	4		
Arcadia Valley	6		
Barat Academy	1		
Barstow	1		
Beaumont	1		
Belton	1		
Benton (St. Joseph)	3		
Bolivar	1		
Cabool	3		
Cardinal Ritter College Preparatory	3		
Center (Kansas City)	2		
Central (New Madrid County)	2		
Central (Springfield)	2		
Clayton	2		
Concordia	2		
Cuba	1		
Drexel	3		
Eugene	2		
Eureka	2		
Forsyth	2		
Fort Zumwalt	1		
Fort Zumwalt East	1		
Fredericktown	1		
Galena	4		
Gateway Institute of Technology	2		
Golden City	1		
Hollister	1		
Jefferson (Festus)	4		
Kennett	1		
Lafayette (St. Joseph)	1		
Laquey	1		
Lathrop	2		
Liberty North	5		
Linn	1		
Living Word (O'Fallon) Christian (Veritas Christian Academy)	3*		
Malden	3		
Mark Twain	1		
McDonald County	1		
Metro Academic & Classical	4		
Mid-Buchanan	1	New Covenant Academy	3
Norborne	1		
Normandy	1		
North Platte	1		
North St. Francois County	1		
Northeast (Kansas City)	1		
Owensville	2		
Pembroke Hill	8		
Portageville	8		
Ritenour	3		
Rockwood Summit	2		
Saxony Lutheran	6		
School of the Ozarks	4		
Senath-Hornersville	1		
Sikeston	1		
Skyline	3		
Smithville	4		
Soldan International Studies	1		
Southland	2		
Southwest (Washburn)	1		
St. Michael the Archangel (Kansas City)	6		
Sullivan	8		
Timberland	3		
Tipton	2		
Walnut Grove	1		
Wheaton	1		
Willard	5		
Wright City	1		
Blue Eye	3		
McAuley Catholic	1		
Calvary Lutheran	4		
Kirksville	3		
Conway	1		
Pleasant Hope	1		
Hallsville	3		
Seneca	1		
MICDS	2		
Chadwick	2		
Plattsburg	1		
St. Clair	1		
J.J. Hogan Preparatory Academy	1		
Southern Boone County	2		
St. Louis Collegiate School of Medicine & Bioscience	2		

Notes

- Italics indicate schools that have closed and are no longer in existence.
- One of Strafford's district titles was revoked after the school allowed an ineligible player to participate in the state tournament.
- Trinity Catholic High School's cumulative total (9) includes the district titles won by Rosary High School (3), Mercy High School (1), and St. Thomas Aquinas High School (1). These latter three schools were separate teams until they consolidated to form the current Trinity Catholic High School, which had won four district titles in its own right before the merger.
- Joplin High School's cumulative total (9) includes the two district titles won by Parkwood High School, which closed and merged with the modern-day Joplin High School, which has won seven district titles in its own right before the merger.
- Tarkio and Fairfax merged as a team during the 2021–2022, 2022–2023, and 2023–2024 seasons due to an insufficient number of players to field a team at each school. The district championships for those seasons are included in both schools' separate counts.
- Living Word (O'Fallon) Christian changed its name to Veritas Christian Academy during the 2024–2025 school year. Two of the school's three district championships were won before it changed its name.
- College Heights Christian School (Joplin) changed its name to New Heights Christian Academy during the 2025–2026 school year. Six of the seven district championships were won before it changed its name.

== State records ==
The following are individuals who hold records throughout the state of Missouri in high school volleyball. Records fall into three categories: offense (assists/sets and attacks/kills), defense (digs/receives and blocks) and serving (aces). They are broken down into three divisions: individual single-match records, individual season records, and individual career records.

=== Individual single-match records ===
Record	# or %	Athlete's name	Athlete's school	Game opponent	Date
Attack attempts	131	Kelly Lynn Clibon	Union Star	South Holt	Oct. 17, 2023
Kills	57	Raylee Stenzel	Mountain Grove	Winona	Oct. 10, 2024
Attack percentage*	0.813%	Tara Leray Venable	Ozark	Lutheran St. Charles	Oct. 12, 2024
Assists	67	Samantha Loida	Valle Catholic (Ste. Genevieve)	Veritas Christian Academy	Nov. 7, 2020
Aces in a single game/match	27	Emerson Walter	Platte County		Sept. 24, 2020
Aces in a single set	19	Lillian Colburn	Butler	Kansas City Christian Academy	Sept. 18, 2017
Digs	85	Sherilyn Long	Bell City		Nov. 11, 2008
Total blocks	17	Becky Haug	Lee's Summit North	Lee's Summit	Sept. 10, 2001

- Attack percentage: minimum of 30 attempts

=== Individual season records ===
Record	# or %	Athlete's name	Athlete's school	Athlete's graduation year	Season	Athlete's year in high school
Attacks	1,597	Raylee Stenzel	Mountain Grove	Class of 2025	2024–2025	Senior
Average attacks per game*	16.99	Raylee Stenzel	Mountain Grove	Class of 2025	2024–2025	Senior
Kills	939	Raylee Stenzel	Mountain Grove	Class of 2025	2024–2025	Senior
Average kills per game*	9.99	Raylee Stenzel	Mountain Grove	Class of 2025	2024–2025	Senior
Attack percentage*	0.538%	Kristin Folkl	St. Joseph's Academy (St. Louis)	Class of 1994	1990–1991	Freshman
Assists	1,329	Samantha Bergjans	Incarnate Word Academy	Class of 2024	2022–2023	Junior
Assists per game*	15.56	Shelley Jackson	Lee's Summit North	Class of 2000	1998–1999	Junior
Aces	136	Sophie Wallace	Collegiate School of Med-Bio Science	Class of 2026	2024–2025	Junior
Aces per game*	3.03	Jamie Shrum	Southwest (Washburn)	Class of 2016	2015–2016	Senior
Digs	865	Kennedy Lia Janes	Ft. Zumwalt North	Class of 2022	2021–2022	Senior
Digs per game*	11.24	Macey Browers	Arcadia Valley	Class of 2019	2018–2019	Senior
Solo blocks	159	Danielle Lindsay	Ste. Genevieve	Class of 2005	2004–2005	Senior
Solo blocks per game*	2.18	Danielle Lindsay	Ste. Genevieve	Class of 2005	2004–2005	Senior
Block assists	121	Marie Lutkewitte	Cor Jesu Academy (St. Louis)	Class of 1995	1993–1994	Junior
Block assists per game*	1.70	Marie Lutkewitte	Cor Jesu Academy (St. Louis)	Class of 1995	1993–1994	Junior
Total blocks	264	Kristin Folkl	St. Joseph's Academy (St. Louis)	Class of 1994	1992–1993	Junior
Total blocks per game*	3.57	Kristin Folkl	St. Joseph's Academy (St. Louis)	Class of 1994	1992–1993	Junior

- Per games: minimum of 65 games
- Attack percentage: minimum of 500 attempts

=== Individual career pecords ===
Record	# or %	Athlete's name	Athlete's school	Seasons played
Attacks	4,923	Raylee Stenzel	Mountain Grove	2021–2024 (4)
Attacks per game*	13.68	Raylee Stenzel	Mountain Grove	2021–2024 (4)
Kills	2,337	Raylee Stenzel	Mountain Grove	2021–2024 (4)
Kills per game*	6.49	Raylee Stenzel	Mountain Grove	2021–2024 (4)
Attack percentage*	0.482	Kristin Folkl	St. Joseph's Academy (St. Louis)	1990–1993 (4)
Assists	4,246	Lexi Lynn Lindsey	Winona	2022–2025 (4)
Assists per game*	13.17	Sarah Mueller	Santa Fe (Alma)	1994–1997 (4)
Aces	417	Sophia Marie Wallace	Collegiate School of Med-Bio Science	2022–2025 (4)
Aces per game*	2.05	Jamie Shrum	Washburn	2012–2015 (4)
Digs	2,360	Jadyn Guerin	Osceola	2022–2025 (4)
Digs per game*	7.67	Kennedy Lia Janes	Ft. Zumwalt North	2021 (1)
Solo blocks	393	Regan Michele Peltier	Nixa	2008–2011 (4)
Solo blocks per game*	1.33	Cameron Layne Dake	Mt. Vernon	2012–2015 (4)
Total blocks	726	Kristin Folkl	St. Joseph's Academy (St. Louis)	1990–1993 (4)
Total blocks per game*	2.37	Kristin Folkl	St. Joseph's Academy (St. Louis)	1990–1993 (4)
Sets played	443	Katelyn Diani-O'Day	Lutheran St. Charles	2021–2024 (4)
Matches played	156	Lisa Hunter	Cor Jesu Academy	1999–2002 (4)

- Per games: minimum of 140 games
- Attack percentage: minimum of 1,000 attempts

== See also ==
- List of Missouri state high school boys basketball championships
- List of Missouri state high school girls basketball championships
- List of Missouri state high school baseball champions
- List of Missouri state high school football champions
- List of Missouri high schools by athletic conferences
