= Halfway High School =

Halfway Junior/Senior High School

Location
- 2150 Hwy 32; Halfway, Missouri 65663; United States; 37°36′54″N 93°14′26″W

Information
- Type: US Public Secondary
- Superintendent: Lance Roweton
- Principal: Lawrence Graves
- Faculty: 11.70 (FTE)
- Grades: 7–12
- Enrollment: 122 (2023–2024)
- Student to teacher ratio: 10.43
- Campus: Rural
- Colors: Red & Black & White
- Mascot: Cardinals
- Website: www.halfwayschools.org/halfway-high-school.html

Halfway High School is a high school located in Halfway, Missouri, United States. The school's mascot is the Cardinal.

According to the 2006–07 School Accountability Report, 90.5% of classes at Halfway High School are taught by "Highly Qualified Teachers."
