= List of Baker Wildcats head football coaches =

The Baker Wildcats football program is a college football team that represents Baker University in the Heart of America Athletic Conference, a part of the NAIA. The team has had 23 head coaches since its first recorded football game in 1890. The current coach is Miguel Regalado who took the position for the 2023 season.

== Key ==
Key to symbols in coaches list
General		Overall		Conference		Postseason (Note: Although the first Rose Bowl Game was played in 1902, it has been continuously played since the 1916 game, and is recognized as the oldest bowl game by the NCAA. "—" indicates any season prior to 1916 when postseason games were not played.)	
No.	Order of coaches (Note: A running total of the number of head coaches, with coaches who served separate tenures being counted only once. Interim head coaches are represented with "Int" and are not counted in the running total. "—" indicates the team played but either without a coach or no coach is on record. "X" indicates an interim year without play.)	GC	Games coached	CW	Conference wins	PW	Postseason wins
DC	Division championships	OW	Overall wins	CL	Conference losses	PL	Postseason losses
CC	Conference championships	OL	Overall losses	CT	Conference ties	PT	Postseason ties
NC	National championships	OT	Overall ties (Note: Overtime rules in college football were introduced in 1996, making ties impossible in the period since.)	C%	Conference winning percentage		
†	Elected to the College Football Hall of Fame	O%	Overall winning percentage (Note: When computing the win–loss percentage, a tie counts as half a win and half a loss.)				

== Coaches ==
Statistics correct as of the end of the 2025 college football season.

No.	Name	Term	GC	OW	OL	OT	O%	CW	CL	CT	C%	PW	PL	CCs	NCs	Awards
1	Salem Goodale	1890–1891	9	6	2	1	.722	—	—	—		—	—	—	—	
2	Frank Crawford	1892	5	2	3	0	.400	—	—	—		—	—	—	—	
3	Charles Thomas	1893	7	6	0	1	.929	—	—	—		—	—	—	—	
X	No team	1894–1908	0	0	0	0	–	—	—	—		—	—	—	—	
4	Theodore M. Stuart	1909	4	3	0	1	.875	—	—	—		—	—	—	—	
5	Louis D. Scherer	1910–1912	23	8	13	2	.391	—	—	—		—	—	—	—	
6	Edward C. Gallagher	1913–1914	16	8	8	0	.500	—	—	—		—	—	—	—	
7	Thomas D. Shepherd	1915	8	5	3	0	.625	—	—	—		—	—	—	—	
8	Karl Schlademan	1916–1918	23	7	14	2	.348	—	—	—		—	—	—	—	
9	Arthur F. Smith	1919	9	4	4	1	.500	—	—	—		—	—	—	—	
10	Emil Liston	1920–1937	181	97	66	18	.586	—	—	—		—	—	—	—	
11	C. W. Ridgeway	1938–1939	18	5	11	2	.333	—	—	—		—	—	—	—	
12	Emil Liston	1940–1942	0	0	0	0	–	—	—	—		—	—	—	—	
X	No team	1943–1945	0	0	0	0	–	—	—	—		—	—	—	—	
13	Karl Spear	1946–1962	152	87	61	4	.586	—	—	—		—	—	2	—	
14	James Irick	1963–1975	117	50	63	4	.444	—	—	—		—	—	—	—	
15	Joe Girardi	1976–1979	41	25	15	1	.622	—	—	—		—	1	1	—	
16	Charlie Richard^{†}	1980–1990	152	123	28	1	.813	—	—	—		11	12	8	—	
17	Dan Harris	1991	9	6	2	1	.722	—	—	—		—	—	1	—	
18	Charlie Richard^{†}	1992–1994	0	0	0	0	–	—	—	—		3	2	2	—	
19	Steve Schottel	1995	9	3	6	0	.333	—	—	—		—	—	—	—	
20	John Frangoulis	1996–2003	84	45	39	0	.536	—	—	—		1	—	—	—	
21	Mike Grossner	2004–2018	172	117	55	0	.680	—	—	—		6	7	1		
22	Jason Thoren	2019–2022	42	30	12	0	.714	—	—	—		1	2			
23	Miguel Regalado	2023–present	33	24	9	0	.727	—	—	—		1	2			

== See also ==
- List of lists of people from Kansas
