= Missouri's 12th Senate district =

American legislative district

Missouri's 12th State Senate district
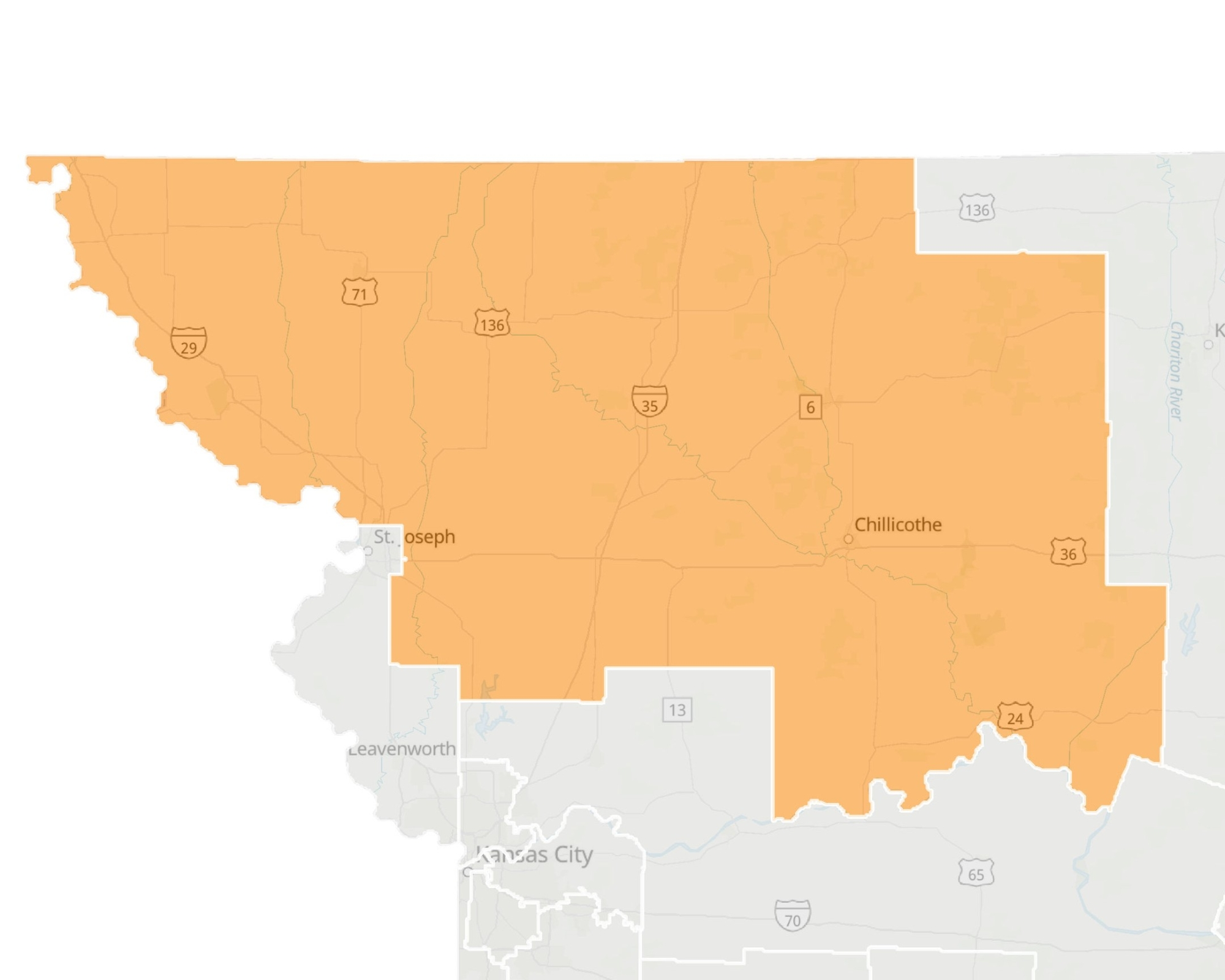
Senator
Rusty Black; R–Chillicothe
- Demographics: 92% White; 2% Black; 3% Hispanic; 1% Asian; 2% Multiracial
- Population (2023): 181,593

Missouri's 12th Senatorial District is one of 34 districts in the Missouri Senate. The district has been represented by Republican Rusty Black since 2023.

== Geography ==
The district is based in rural northwestern Missouri and includes Andrew, Atchison, Caldwell, Carroll, Chariton, Clinton, Daviess, Dekalb, Gentry, Grundy, Harrison, Holt, Linn, Livingston, Mercer, Nodaway, Sullivan, Worth, and northeastern Buchanan counties. Major municipalities in the district include Cameron, Chillicothe, Maryville, Savannah, and Trenton. The district is also home to Northwest Missouri State University, Swan Lake National Wildlife Refuge, and several state parks and conservation areas.

== Potential 2026 candidates ==
=== Republican primary ===
- Rusty Black, incumbent senator
- Freddie Griffin Jr, machine operator

== Election results (1998–2022) ==
=== 1998 ===
Missouri's 12th Senatorial District election (1998)
Party	Candidate	Votes	%
Republican	Sam Graves	31,883	62.7
Democratic	Beth M. Wheeler	18,974	37.3
Total votes		50,857	100.0

=== 2001 ===
Missouri's 12th Senatorial District special election (2001)
Party	Candidate	Votes	%
Republican	David Klindt	16,937	66.1
Democratic	Randall Relford	8,678	33.9
Total votes		25,615	100.0

=== 2002 ===
Missouri's 12th Senatorial District election (2002)
Party	Candidate	Votes	%
Republican	David Klindt (incumbent)	41,721	100.0
Total votes		41,721	100.0
Republican hold			

=== 2006 ===
Missouri's 12th Senatorial District election (2006)
Party	Candidate	Votes	%
Republican	Brad Lager	36,481	59.2
Democratic	James W. Neely	25,136	40.8
Total votes		61,617	100.0
Republican hold			

=== 2010 ===
Missouri's 12th Senatorial District election (2010)
Party	Candidate	Votes	%
Republican	Brad Lager (incumbent)	46,748	100.0
Total votes		46,748	100.0
Republican hold			

=== 2014 ===
Missouri's 12th Senatorial District election (2014)
Party	Candidate	Votes	%
Republican	Dan Hegeman	39,006	100.0
Total votes		39,006	100.0
Republican hold			

=== 2018 ===
Missouri's 12th Senatorial District election (2018)
Party	Candidate	Votes	%
Republican	Dan Hegeman (incumbent)	50,035	72.5
Democratic	Terry Richard	18,986	27.5
Total votes		69,021	100.0
Republican hold			

=== 2022 ===
Missouri's 12th Senatorial District election (2022)
Party	Candidate	Votes	%
Republican	Rusty Black	51,470	80.8
Democratic	Michael J. Baumli	12,254	19.2
Total votes		63,724	100.0
Republican hold			

== Statewide election results ==
Year	Office	Results
2008	President	McCain 58.2 – 38.1%
2012	President	Romney 67.9 – 32.1%
2016	President	Trump 74.3 – 21.1%
2016	Senate	Blunt 61.1 – 34.0%
2016	Governor	Greitens 63.4 – 33.8%
2018	Senate	Hawley 67.2 – 28.9%
2020	President	Trump 76.8 – 21.8%
2020	Governor	Parson 76.1 – 21.9%
