= Miss Show-Me Basketball =

- Awarded for: The top female high school basketball player in Missouri
- Country: United States
- Presented by: Missouri Basketball Coaches Association
- First award: 1985
- Website: Miss Show-Me Basketball Website

The Miss Show-Me Basketball honor recognizes the top female high school basketball player in the state of Missouri. The name of the award differs from other Miss Basketball awards to reflect Missouri's state nickname, the Show-Me State. The award is presented annually by the Missouri Basketball Coaches Association. In order to be considered for the award, nominees must have been nominated by their high school coach, started in 90 percent of all games, must be high school seniors, and must be of "outstanding moral character". Ten girls are selected as finalists after nominations are compiled, and a special committee of assistant college coaches in Missouri choose the winner.

The first recipient of the honor was Janet Clark in 1985, who is the all-time leader in total points scored for the Northwest Missouri State Bearcats women's basketball team with 2,121 points. Two sisters, Lori and Lisa Sandbothe, received the honor in 1986 and 1987 respectively and both went on to play for the Missouri Tigers women's basketball team. In 2015, the honor was shared between Napheesa Collier and Sophie Cunningham, who both played as teammates in the McDonald's All-American Game that year. Five recipients of the Miss Show-Me Basketball honor have been drafted into the WNBA, the highest draft pick being Kristin Folkl with the 1st overall pick in the 1999 WNBA draft as part of the initial expansion player allocation. Other recipients of the honor have played with professional teams in Europe and Asia, such as Kari Koch and Shakara Jones in Greece, Heather Ezell in Iceland, and Yvonne Anderson in Turkey. Many recipients have also pursued coaching opportunities in high schools and colleges.

== Winners ==
Year	Player	High School	College	Notes	Refs
1985	Janet Clark	Lafayette	Northwest Missouri State	All-time leader in total points scored for the Northwest Missouri State Bearcats women's basketball team with 2,121 points	
1986	Lori Sandbothe	Washington	Missouri	Played for the Missouri Tigers women's basketball team with her sister and fellow Miss Show-Me Basketball recipient Lisa Sandbothe	
1987	Lisa Sandbothe	Washington	Missouri	Played for the Missouri Tigers women's basketball team with her sister and fellow Miss Show-Me Basketball recipient Lori Sandbothe	
1988	Rhonda Moore	Hazelwood East	Missouri	Named on the 20-year all-star women's basketball team for the Greater St. Louis area by The St. Louis American in 2006	
1989	Kim Mahn	De Soto	Oklahoma State	In 2018, Mahn was the first athlete in De Soto High School history to have a number retired	
1990	Melody Howard	Marshfield	Missouri State	Played for the United States in the 1993 World University Games, inducted into the Missouri Sports Hall of Fame in 1999	
1991	Melissa Grider	Marshfield	Missouri Southern	Scored 3,211 total points in her high school career (Missouri record until 2010), named on the all-time Ozarks women's basketball team by Ozark Preps Illustrated in 2015	
1992	Andrea Siemer	Jackson	Missouri	Named to the academic all-conference team three years in a row while playing for the Missouri Tigers women's basketball team	
1993	Marsha Burton	Marionville	Missouri State and Evangel	Received NAIA All-American honors in 1997, basketball coach for Pierce City High School and Hurley High School	
1994	Kristin Folkl	St. Joseph's	Stanford	Selected by the Minnesota Lynx in the first round (1st overall pick) of the 1999 WNBA draft as part of the initial expansion player allocation, All-American her senior year playing for the Stanford Cardinal women's basketball team, first-alternate for the United States women's volleyball team during the 1996 Summer Olympics, recipient of the Dial Award for the top female high school athlete in the country in 1994	
1995	Amy Rhea	St. James	John Brown	Honored with Freshman of the Year in the Sooner Athletic Conference in 1996, all-time leader in total points scored for the St. James High School women's basketball team with 2,604 points	
1996	Niele Ivey	Cor Jesu	Notre Dame	Selected by the Indiana Fever in the second round (17th overall pick) of the 2001 WNBA draft, played in the WNBA for the Indiana Fever, Detroit Shock, and Phoenix Mercury, assistant basketball coach for the Notre Dame Fighting Irish women's basketball team, named on the 20-year all-star women's basketball team for the Greater St. Louis area by The St. Louis American in 2006	
1997	April McKinney	Incarnate Word	Saint Louis	Named on the 20-year all-star women's basketball team for the Greater St. Louis area by The St. Louis American in 2006	
1998	Lauren Jackson	North Kansas City	Memphis	All-time leader in total points scored for the North Kansas City High School women's basketball team with 2,124 points	
1999	Karensa Barr	West Plains	Missouri	Member of the Big 12 All-Star European Tour, invited to the USA Basketball tryouts in 2001, inducted into the Missouri Sports Hall of Fame in 2018	
2000	Terianne Wolford	Nixa	Missouri	All-time leader in total points scored for the Nixa Public High School women's basketball team with 2,267 points	
2001	Dionnah Jackson	Parkway West	Oklahoma	Selected by the Detroit Shock in the first round (13th overall pick) of the 2005 WNBA draft, assistant basketball coach for Mississippi State University and Southeast Missouri State University	
2002	Kari Koch	Elsberry	Missouri State	Played professional basketball in Greece for five years, named on the MVC all-centennial team in 2007, assistant basketball coach for Auburn University	
2003	Laura Granzow	Kickapoo	Denver and Canisius	Nominated for the Gatorade Player of the Year award and the McDonald's All-American Game	
2004	Katie Dierdorf	Visitation	Michigan	Injuries plagued Dierdorf for the majority of her collegiate career with the Michigan Wolverines women's basketball team	
2005	Heather Ezell	Kickapoo	Iowa State	Played professional basketball for Haukar in Iceland for the 2009–2010 season, assistant basketball coach for Fairfield University	
2006	Mackenzie Stirmlinger	St. Joseph's	Iowa State	Nominated for the Gatorade Player of the Year award	
2007	Shakara Jones	Francis Howell Central	Missouri	Played professional basketball in Greece for Asteras Exarchion	
2008	Yvonne Anderson	Hickman	Texas	Signed a training camp contract with the Chicago Sky in 2017, played in the Turkish Women's Basketball League for Galatasaray	
2009	Morgan Johnson	Platte County	Iowa	All-time leader for the Iowa Hawkeyes women's basketball team in career shot blocks with 293 blocks	
2010	Anne Marie Hartung	Bowling Green	Texas	Played for the Texas Longhorns women's basketball team for only two seasons	
2011	Shelby Winkelmann	Hermann	Central Missouri	Named to the 2015–2016 CoSIDA Academic All-American team for Division II	
2012	Taylor Manuel	Incarnate Word	Purdue, Loyola (IL), and Ole Miss	Awarded the 2014–2015 Missouri Valley Newcomer of the Year	
2013	Sierra Michaelis	Mercer	Missouri	–	
2014	Carrie Shephard	South Pemiscot	Missouri and SEMO	–	
2015	Napheesa Collier	Incarnate Word	UConn	Selected by the Minnesota Lynx in the first round (6th overall pick) of the 2019 WNBA draft	
2015	Sophie Cunningham	Rock Bridge	Missouri	Selected by the Phoenix Mercury in the second round (13th overall pick) of the 2019 WNBA draft	
2016	Taylor Baur	MICDS	Princeton	–	
2017	Lauryn Miller	Kirkwood	UCLA	–	
2018	Sonya Morris	Incarnate Word	DePaul	–	
2019	Hayley Frank	Strafford	Missouri	–	
2020	Katie Scott	Carl Junction	Grand Canyon, Oral Roberts, and Point Loma	–	
2021	Serena Sundell	Maryville	Kansas State	–	
2022	Ysabella Fontleroy	Kickapoo	Baylor	–	
2023	Grace Slaughter	Grain Valley	Missouri	–	
2024	Allie Turner	John Burroughs	Gonzaga	–	
2025	Nevaeh Coffey	Incarnate Word Academy	Indiana	–	

== Schools with multiple winners ==
School	Number of Awards	Years
Incarnate Word	4	1997, 2012, 2015, 2018
Kickapoo	3	2003, 2005, 2022
Marshfield	2	1990, 1991
St. Joseph's	2	1994, 2006
Washington	2	1986, 1987

== See also ==
- Mr. Show-Me Basketball
- Mr. Basketball USA
