= Frangoulis =

Frangoulis is a surname. Notable people with the surname include:

- Mario Frangoulis
- John Frangoulis
