= Saint Pius X Catholic High School (Kansas City, Missouri) =

St. Pius X Catholic High School

Location
- 1500 NE 42nd Terrace; Kansas City, Missouri 64116; United States; 39°10′22″N 94°33′42″W

Information
- Type: Private university preparatory secondary school
- Religious affiliations: Catholic Church; Latin Church
- Patron saint: Pope Pius X
- Established: 1956; 70 years ago
- Founders: Frank Tiedtka; Robert Henehan; Francis Brand; George Stark
- School district: Diocese of Kansas City–Saint Joseph
- Authority: James V. Johnston, Bishop
- Superintendent: Dr. Karen Kroh
- President: Joe Ross
- Principal: Bob Lee
- Chaplain: Fr. Mark Famuliner
- Teaching staff: 34.0 (FTE) (2021–22)
- Grades: 9–12
- Gender: Coeducational
- Enrollment: 341 (2021–22)
- Student to teacher ratio: 10.0 (2021–22)
- Classes offered: 14 AP & College Credit Classes
- Colors: Blue and Gold
- Slogan: "Restore All Things In Christ"
- Athletics conference: Midland Empire Conference
- Team name: Warriors
- Rival: Bishop LeBlond Eagles
- Accreditation: North Central Association of Colleges and Schools
- Newspaper: The Sartonian
- Yearbook: Tiara
- Website: spxkc.org

St. Pius X Catholic High School is a private Catholic university preparatory secondary school in Kansas City, Missouri (U.S.). It is located in the Diocese of Kansas City–Saint Joseph.

St. Pius X Catholic High School opened in 1956. The student body is composed of ninth through twelfth-grade students. The school is adjacent to St. Patrick Parish & School off of Interstate 29. The school's current principal is Robert Lee.

== State Championships ==
As of 2026, the school is not affiliated with any conference (it was with the Midland Empire Conference from 2017 to 2025. It has won 11 state championships through 2026.

- Baseball (Spring Season) - 1991 (Class 2A), 1998 (2A), 1999 (2A), 2021 (3)
- Football - 1998 (2A), 2000 (2A), 2002 (2)
- Golf Boys - 2019 (2)
- Volleyball Girls - 2006 (3)
- Wrestling Boys - 2024 (1), 2025 (3)
