= Irick =

Irick is a surname. Notable people with the surname include:

- Billy Ray Irick (1958–2018), American convicted murderer
- James Irick (1923–1993), American football and basketball coach

== See also ==
- Rick (disambiguation)
