= Klindt =

Klindt is a surname. Notable people with the surname include:

- Anna Klindt Sørensen (1899–1985), Danish painter and illustrator
- David Klindt (born 1950), American politician
- Nicolai Klindt (born 1988), Danish motorcycle speedway rider
