= Klippenstein =

Klippenstein is a surname. Notable people with the surname include:

- Dan Klippenstein (1939–1997), Canadian curler
- Glen Klippenstein (born 1937), American politician
- Ken Klippenstein (born 1988), American journalist
