= Maryville High School =

Maryville High School may refer to:

- Maryville High School (Missouri)
- Maryville High School (Ohio)
- Maryville High School (Maryland)
- Maryville High School (Tennessee)
