= Savannah High School =

Savannah High School may refer to:

- Savannah High School (Georgia) — Savannah, Georgia
- Savannah High School (Missouri) — Savannah, Missouri
- Savanna High School — Anaheim, California
