= Brad Lager =

American politician

Member of the Missouri Senate from the 12th district
- In office 2007–2015
- Preceded by: David Klindt
- Succeeded by: Dan Hegeman

Member of the Missouri House of Representatives from the 4th district
- In office 2003–2007
- Preceded by: Rex Barnett
- Succeeded by: Mike Thomson

Personal details
- Born: July 20, 1975 (age 51) Maryville, Missouri, U.S.
- Party: Republican
- Spouse: Stephanie
- Education: Northwest Missouri State University
- Occupation: Politician

Brad Ronald Lager (born July 20, 1975, in Maryville, Missouri) is a Republican politician from the state of Missouri. He is a former member of the Missouri Senate from the 12th District as well as a former member of the Missouri House of Representatives and former candidate for State Treasurer in 2008. Lager ran unsuccessfully for the Republican nomination for Missouri Lieutenant Governor in 2012.

== Personal life and education ==
Brad Lager is a lifelong resident of northwest Missouri. After graduation from Northeast Nodaway High School (Ravenwood) in 1993, he attended Northwest Missouri State University. Lager graduated summa cum laude with a B.S. in computer management systems in 1997. During his five years between college and running for political office, Lager worked for Northwest Missouri Cellular as General Manager.

Lager was the owner of the now dissolved LMS Communications and is a co-owner of Lager Car Wash. Lager spent five years working as a senior strategic analyst in health e-services for Cerner Corporation, a large healthcare information technology company. He is currently the President of Herzog Technologies, Inc. and the Executive-Vice President for William E Herzog Enterprises, Inc., the holding company for all of the Herzog Companies. Senator Lager and his wife Stephanie reside near Savannah, Missouri with their daughter Addison and son Andrew.

== Political career ==
Brad Lager's career in politics began in 2001, at age 25, when he was elected to the Maryville City Council, becoming the city's youngest councilmember ever. Shortly thereafter, in 2002, Lager was elected to the Missouri House of Representatives from the 4th District after defeating Democrat Larry Dougan. He would run unopposed for reelection in 2004. Brad Lager served as the House Budget Chairman in 2005 and moved from the House to the Missouri Senate in 2006 after defeating Democrat James W. Neely by over 11,000 votes. Lager ran statewide for Treasurer in 2008 and lost to Democrat Clint Zweifel. Lager would run unopposed in 2010 to win reelection to his State Senate seat.

== Political controversies ==
According to the Missouri Ethics Commission, as a state senator, Senator Lager received two $100,000.00 donations from two contributors on September 28, 2010 and September 30, 2010. Additionally, Lager's bid for Lieutenant Governor has been largely funded by two prominent Republican donors, The Humphreys Family (Tamko Building Products). Together and through their respective businesses, Humphreys have donated about $700,000 to Lager's campaign. In 2005, Lager was removed as Chairman of the House Budget Committee. Then Speaker of the House Rod Jetton stripped Lager of his chairmanship for Lager's refusal to work with Republican leadership to craft a consensus budget. Jetton cited "differences in priorities" in his decision to remove Lager.

== Statewide campaigns ==
In 2008 Senator Lager mounted an unsuccessful campaign for Missouri State Treasurer. After running unopposed in the August Republican primary, Brad Lager lost the November general election to Democratic nominee, State Representative Clint Zweifel. On November 14, 2011 Brad Lager announced his candidacy for Missouri Lieutenant Governor in 2012. He narrowly lost the GOP primary to the incumbent, Peter Kinder. Lager was term-limited in 2014 by Missouri law from running for his State Senate seat again.

=== Election results ===
Missouri 4th District State Representative, 2002
Party	Candidate	Votes	%	±%
Republican	Brad Lager	6,341	53	Winner
Democratic	Larry Dougan	5,617	47	

Missouri 12th District State Senate, 2006
Party	Candidate	Votes	%	±%
Republican	Brad Lager	36,481	59.2	Winner
Democratic	James W. Neely	25,136	40.8	

Missouri State Treasurer, 2008
Party	Candidate	Votes	%	±%
Democratic	Clint Zweifel	1,394,627	50.5	Winner
Republican	Brad Lager	1,302,625	47.1	

Party political offices
Preceded by Sarah Steelman	Republican nominee for State Treasurer of Missouri; 2008	Succeeded by Cole McNary
