= Rusty Black =

American politician

Member of the Missouri Senate from the 12th district
- Incumbent
- Assumed office 2023
- Preceded by: Dan Hegeman

Member of the Missouri House of Representatives from the 7th district
- In office 2017–2023
- Preceded by: Mike Lair
- Succeeded by: Peggy McGaugh (redistricting)

Personal details
- Born: Saint Joseph, Missouri, U.S.
- Party: Republican
- Education: University of Missouri

Rusty Black is an American politician. He is a Republican representing the 12th district in the Missouri Senate. He previously represented the 7th district in the Missouri House of Representatives from 2017 to 2023, elected in 2016, 2018, and 2020.

== Personal life ==
Black was born in Saint Joseph, Missouri and graduated from high school in King City, Missouri. He holds a Bachelor of Science and a Master of Science, both in Agriculture Education, from the University of Missouri, and worked as an agriculture educator for 32 years before retiring in 2016. He and his wife live in Chillicothe, Missouri and have four children.

== Political career ==
In 2016, Black ran for election to the District 7 seat in the Missouri House of Representatives, which was open due to the former representative, Mike Lair, reaching the term limit. Black defeated John Myers in the Republican primary with 86.42% of the vote, and was unopposed in the general election. In 2018, he defeated Democrat Dennis VanDyke with 79.6% of the vote, and ran unopposed in 2020. He won the Republican Primary in August 2022 for Senate district 12, defeating two opponents, and then won the general election by a landslide.

== Electoral history ==
=== State representative ===
2016 Republican primary: Missouri House of Representatives, District 7
Party	Candidate	Votes	%
Republican	Rusty Black	4,104	86.42%
Republican	John Myers	645	13.58%

2016 Republican Election: Missouri House of Representatives, District 7
Party	Candidate	Votes	%
Republican	Rusty Black	13,580	100.00%

2018 general election: Missouri House of Representatives, District 7
Party	Candidate	Votes	%
Republican	Rusty Black	9,763	79.6%
Democratic	Dennis VanDyke	2,501	20.4%

2020 general election: Missouri House of Representative, District 7
Party	Candidate	Votes	%
Republican	Rusty Black	14,134	100.00%

=== State Senate ===
Missouri Senate Primary Election, August 2, 2022, District 12
Party	Candidate	Votes	%
Republican	Rusty Black	20,385	64.82%
Republican	J. Eggleston	8,153	25.92%
Republican	Delus Johnson	2,912	9.26%
Total votes		31,450	100.00%

Missouri Senate Election, November 8, 2022, District 12
Party	Candidate	Votes	%
Republican	Rusty Black	51,470	80.77%
Democratic	Michael J. Baumli	12,254	19.23%
Total votes		63,724	100.00%
