= Midland Empire Conference =

High school athletic conference in Missouri, United States

- Association: MSHSAA
- No. of teams: 11
- Region: Northwest Missouri

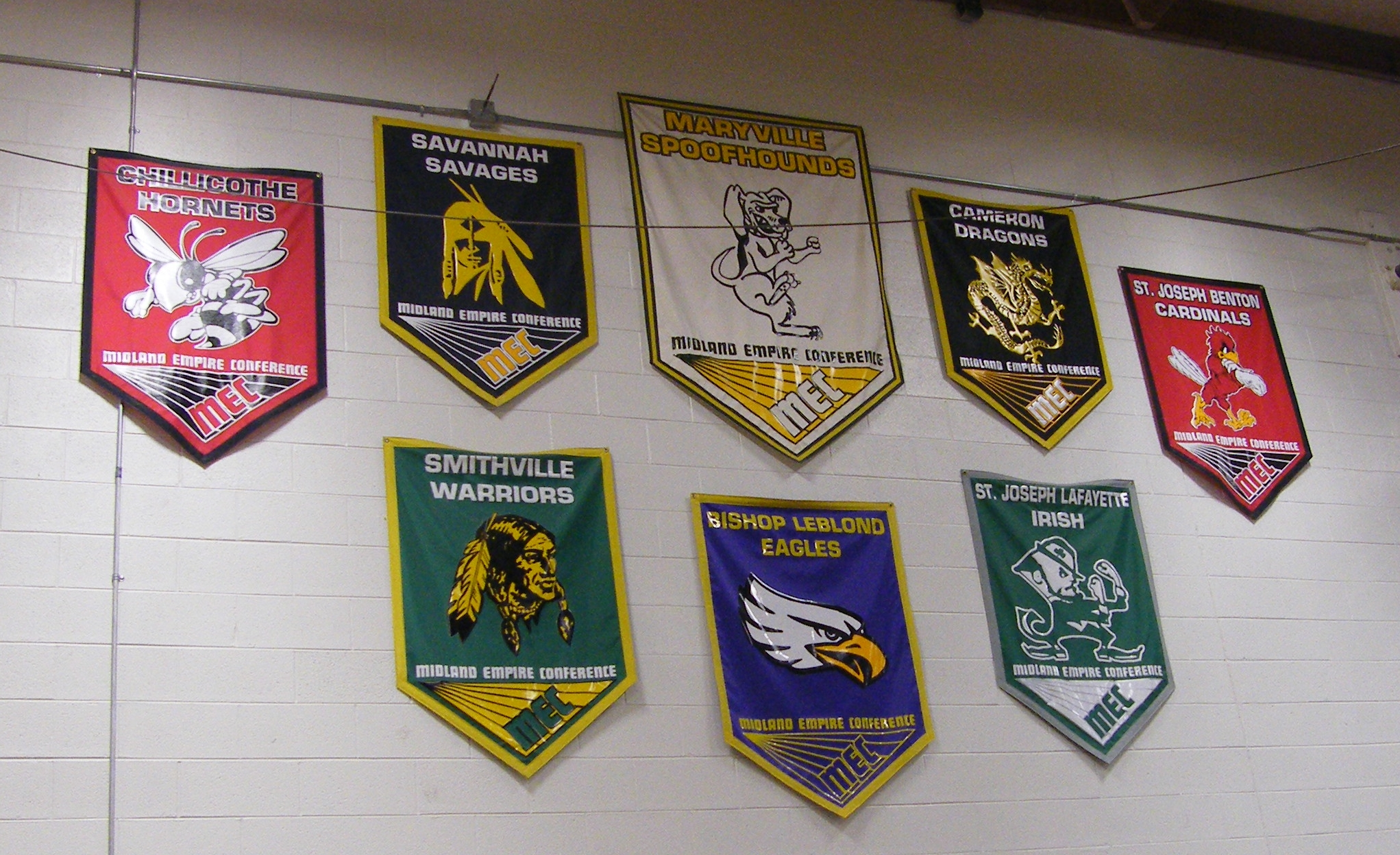
Banners of various high schools in Maryville, Missouri

The Midland Empire Conference (MEC) is a high school athletic conference whose members are located in northwest Missouri. The conference participates in the MSHSAA.

The conference was created during a March 1962 meeting at Armstrong's Restaurant in Maryville, Missouri and took effect in the 1962–63 school year. The original five schools were four schools from St. Joseph, Missouri (Benton, Christian Brothers (which would fold into LeBlond), and Lafayette) and two other schools from northwest Missouri (Maryville and Savannah). The arrangement created a league of schools of comparable size (the St. Joseph schools earlier competed in the Pony Express Conference which included the much larger St. Joseph Central High School as well as larger suburban Kansas City schools while Savannah and Maryville competed in the Northwest Missouri Conference with much smaller schools since 1937.

Discussions of creating a conference of larger comparable sized schools in northwest Missouri had been discussed since at least 1925 but never quite materialized.

In 2018, Smithville left the conference for the Suburban Kansas City Conference and was replaced by St. Pius X in Kansas City.

In November 2025, St. Joseph Public Schools announced their plan for Lafayette High School to be converted to a middle school, consolidating into just 2 high schools, Benton and Central.

In April 2026, former NCMC schools Kirksville, Marshall, Mexico, and Moberly accepted invitations to the conference. With these additions, which are to take effect in the 2028–29 school year, the conference announced they would split into 2 divisions, east and west.

== Member schools ==
=== East Division ===
School	Nickname	Colors	City	County	Type	Year Joined
Chillicothe	Hornets		Chillicothe	Livingston	Public	1985
Kirksville	Tigers		Kirksville	Adair	Public	2028
Marshall	Owls		Marshall	Saline	Public	2028
Mexico	Bulldogs		Mexico	Audrain	Public	2028
Moberly	Spartans		Moberly	Randolph	Public	2028

=== West Division ===
School	Nickname	Colors	City	County	Type	Year Joined
Benton	Cardinals		St. Joseph	Buchanan	Public	1962
Bishop LeBlond (Note: Bishop LeBlond does not compete in the Midland Empire Conference for football)	Golden Eagles		St. Joseph	Buchanan	Private (Catholic)	1962
Cameron	Dragons		Cameron	Clinton	Public	1998
Excelsior Springs	Tigers		Excelsior Springs	Clay	Public	2026
Maryville	Spoofhounds		Maryville	Nodaway	Public	1962
Savannah	Savages		Savannah	Andrew	Public	1962

== Former members ==
- Lafayette (1962–2026)
- Platte County (1998–2007)
- Smithville (1998–2018)
- St. Pius X (2017–2025)

=== Membership timeline ===
Full members Full members (non-football)
