= John Frangoulis =

American football coach

Biographical details
- Born: 1951 or 1952 (age 74–75)

Coaching career (HC unless noted)
- 1993–1995: Baker (DC)
- 1996–2003: Baker
- 2004–2006: Charles W. Flanagan HS (FL)
- 2006-2023: Troy Buchanan High School (MO)

Head coaching record
- Overall: 45–39 (college); 9–18 (high school)
- Bowls: 0–1

John Frangoulis is an American football coach. He was the head football coach at Baker University in Baldwin City, Kansas for eight seasons, from 1996 until 2003. His coaching record at Baker was 45–39. His coaching philosophy and style was heavily influenced by prior Baker coach Charlie Richard.

Frangoulis had been an assistant at Baker and was promoted to head coach after the resignation of the previous coach Steve Schottel. He resigned from the position two days after the completion of the 2003 season. He then entered the high school coaching ranks in Florida.

== Head coaching record ==
=== College ===
| Year | Team | Overall | Conference | Standing | Bowl/playoffs | NAIA^{#} |
|---|---|---|---|---|---|---|
Baker Wildcats (Heart of America Athletic Conference) (1996–2003)
| 1996 | Baker | 7–4 | 7–2 | T–2nd | L Wheat | |
| 1997 | Baker | 6–4 | 5–4 | T–4th | | |
| 1998 | Baker | 5–5 | 5–4 | T–4th | | |
| 1999 | Baker | 6–4 | 6–3 | T–3rd | | |
| 2000 | Baker | 9–2 | 7–2 | 3rd | | 18 |
| 2001 | Baker | 5–6 | 5–5 | T–4th | | |
| 2002 | Baker | 3–8 | 3–7 | 9th | | |
| 2003 | Baker | 4–6 | 4–6 | T–7th | | |
| Baker: | | 45–39 | 42–33 | | | |
| Total: | | 45–39 | | | | |
