= Rex Barnett =

American politician

Member of the Missouri House of Representatives from the 4th district
- In office 1995–2003
- Preceded by: Sam Graves
- Succeeded by: Brad Lager

Personal details
- Born: November 22, 1938 (age 87) Laredo, Missouri
- Party: Republican
- Education: Trenton Junior College; Central Missouri State University

Rex Barnett (born October 22, 1938) is an American politician and former member of the Missouri State Highway Patrol.

A Republican, he represented District 4 (Atchison, Nodaway and Worth Counties) in the Missouri House of Representatives for four terms (from 1995 to 2003). During this time, he sat on committees for criminal law, public safety and law enforcement, and appropriations for corrections and public safety.

== Allegations of obstruction of justice ==
In 2012, Barnett's grandson, Matthew Barnett, was arrested for the rape of the then fourteen-year-old Daisy Coleman and for having left her unconscious on her family's front porch in severe conditions in Maryville, Missouri. Barnett's grandson confessed, but prosecutors declined to pursue charges, and allegations were subsequently made that Barnett had interfered with the case.

Barnett subsequently denied any involvement in the case, stating that he "knew that any contact whatsoever by me with the sheriff’s department or prosecuting attorney — or any witness, as far as that goes — would have been bad for me and bad for the case." Barnett's grandson pleaded guilty to misdemeanor second-degree endangerment of the welfare of a child for leaving Coleman outside her house, and was sentenced by Missouri Circuit Judge Glen Dietrich to four months in jail that were suspended in favor of two years probation.

Daisy Coleman died by suicide on August 4, 2020. Daisy's mother, Melinda Coleman, died by suicide on December 6, barely four months later.

== See also ==
- Audrie & Daisy
