= Sam Graves =

American politician (born 1963)

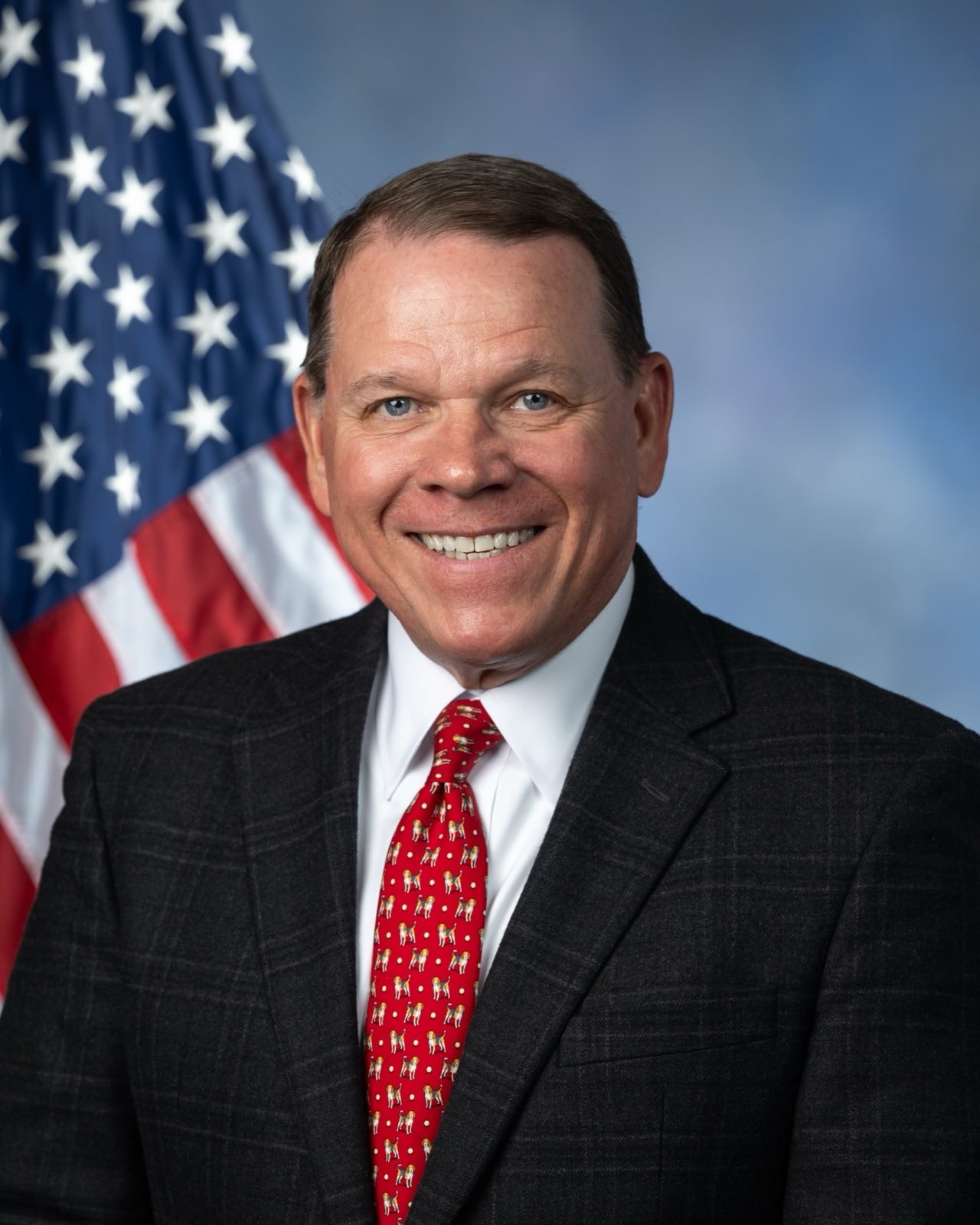
- Official portrait, 2024

Member of the U.S. House of Representatives from Missouri's 6th district
- Incumbent
- Assumed office January 3, 2001
- Preceded by: Pat Danner
House positions
Chair of the House Transportation Committee
Incumbent
Assumed office January 3, 2023
Preceded by	Peter DeFazio
Ranking Member of the House Transportation Committee
In office January 3, 2019 – January 3, 2023
Preceded by	Peter DeFazio
Succeeded by	Rick Larsen
Chair of the House Small Business Committee
In office January 3, 2011 – January 3, 2015
Preceded by	Nydia Velázquez
Succeeded by	Steve Chabot
Ranking Member of the House Small Business Committee
In office January 3, 2009 – January 3, 2011
Preceded by	Steve Chabot
Succeeded by	Nydia Velázquez

Member of the Missouri Senate from the 12th district
- In office January 4, 1995 – January 3, 2001
- Preceded by: Glen Klippenstein
- Succeeded by: David Klindt

Member of the Missouri House of Representatives from the 4th district
- In office January 6, 1993 – January 4, 1995
- Preceded by: Phil Tate
- Succeeded by: Rex Barnett

Personal details
- Born: Samuel Bruce Graves Jr. November 7, 1963 (age 63) Tarkio, Missouri, U.S.
- Party: Republican
- Spouse: Lesley Hickok (m. 1986–2012)
- Children: 3
- Relatives: Todd Graves (brother)
- Education: University of Missouri (BS)
- Website: House website Campaign website
- Graves's voice Graves supporting a joint resolution to end the COVID-19 national emergency. Recorded February 1, 2023

Samuel Bruce Graves Jr. (born November 7, 1963) is an American politician who is currently serving in the U.S. House of Representatives for Missouri's 6th congressional district, with him being the dean of Missouri's congressional delegation upon the retirement of Senator Roy Blunt in 2023, and having held office since 2001. His district stretches across most of the northern third of the state, from the Kansas border to the Illinois border. The bulk of its population lives in the northern part of the Kansas City metropolitan area.

Graves is a member of the Republican Party. He has notably served as the Chair in charge of the influential Committee on Transportation and Infrastructure in the U.S. House for multiple years, with him being able to exceed the system of American term limits normally enforced by the Republican leadership.

On March 27, 2026, Graves announced he would not seek re-election in 2026.

== Early life ==
Graves was born on November 7, 1963, in Tarkio, Missouri. He is the son of Janice A. (née Hord) and Samuel Bruce Graves, and the brother of attorney Todd Graves. He graduated from the University of Missouri College of Agriculture with a degree in agronomy. He is a member of the Alpha Gamma Sigma fraternity.

== Missouri legislature ==
Graves was elected to the Missouri House of Representatives in 1992. After one term, he was elected to the Missouri Senate in 1994 and reelected in 1998.

== U.S. House of Representatives ==
The Center for Effective Lawmaking at Vanderbilt University and the University of Virginia ranked him as the most effective House Republican in the 118th Congress (2023–25).

=== Political positions ===
==== Environmental policy ====
In 2025 and 2026, Graves proposed an annual tax on electric and hybrid vehicles.

==== Financial bailouts ====
After the September 2008 economic crisis, Graves voted against the proposed bailout of United States financial system, claiming it "neither 'punished the wrongdoers nor adequately protected the innocent taxpayers, investors and retirees' caught in the Wall Street banking crisis." In January 2014, Graves introduced the TRICARE Family Improvement Act. The bill would allow dependents of military members to stay on their parents' TRICARE health plan after turning age 26. The bill would change current law, which requires those dependents to change to a separate health plan after turning 26. The American Conservative Union gave him an 85% evaluation in 2017. As of 2019, Graves has a 4% lifetime score from the League of Conservation Voters.

==== Boeing 737 MAX crashes ====
Graves blamed on May 13, 2019, at the House Aviation subcommittee hearing, the 737 MAX crashes (Lion Air Flight 610) on October 29, 2018, and Ethiopian Airlines Flight 302) on poor training of the Indonesian and Ethiopian pilots. He stated also that "pilots trained in the U.S. would have been successful" in handling the emergencies on both jets. One month earlier the Federal Aviation Administration (FAA) had issued the Boeing 737 MAX groundings.

==== Israel-Palestine ====
Graves voted to support Israel following the October 7 attacks.

=== Committee assignments ===
- Committee on Armed Services
  - Subcommittee on Tactical Air and Land Forces
- Committee on Transportation and Infrastructure (chair)
  - As Chair of the committee, Rep. Graves is entitled to sit as an ex officio member in any subcommittee meeting per the committee's rules.

=== Caucus memberships ===
- Congressional Cement Caucus
- Congressional Coalition on Adoption
- Congressional Taiwan Caucus
- United States–China Working Group

== Ethics investigation ==
In 2009, the House Ethics Committee began an inquiry into whether Graves used his position on the Small Business Committee to invite Brooks Hurst, a longtime friend and a business partner of his wife, to testify at a committee hearing on the federal regulation of biodiesel and ethanol production. Graves had failed to mention the financial link between his wife and Hurst at the hearing, which dealt with federal subsidies for renewable fuels. A review by the independent Office of Congressional Ethics found "substantial reason to believe that an appearance of conflict of interest was created." Graves said in a statement, "I look forward to a quick review of the facts and answering any questions that the committee may have. I believe that a speedy review will show that all the rules of the House concerning testimony in front of the Small Business Committee were followed." The Office of Congressional Ethics referred the case to the House Ethics committee, which ended its own investigation in October, and released a report finding no ethical violations, as it asserted there was no standard in place for appearances like Hurst's.

== Retirement ==
On March 27, 2026, Graves said he would retire in January 2027.

== Political campaigns ==
Before his congressional career, Graves served eight years in the Missouri General Assembly, winning election to the Missouri House of Representatives once, and to the Missouri Senate twice.

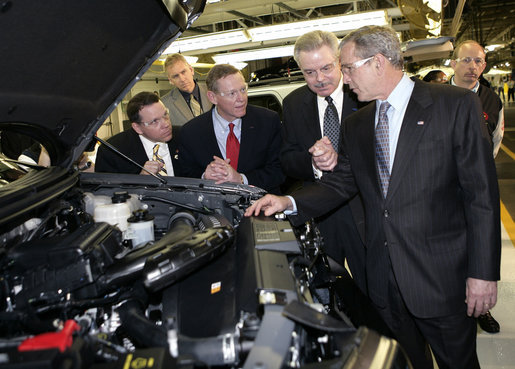
Graves on the left with President George W. Bush at the Ford Kansas City Assembly Plant in Claycomo, Missouri on March 20, 2007

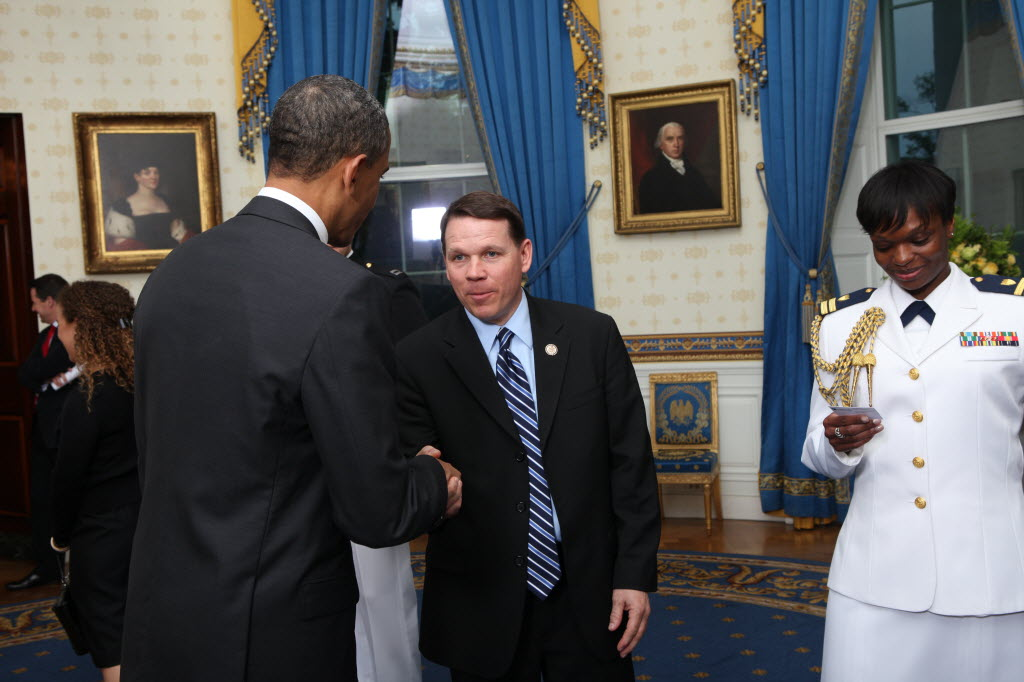
Graves greeting President Barack Obama in the Blue Room of the White House on May 2, 2011

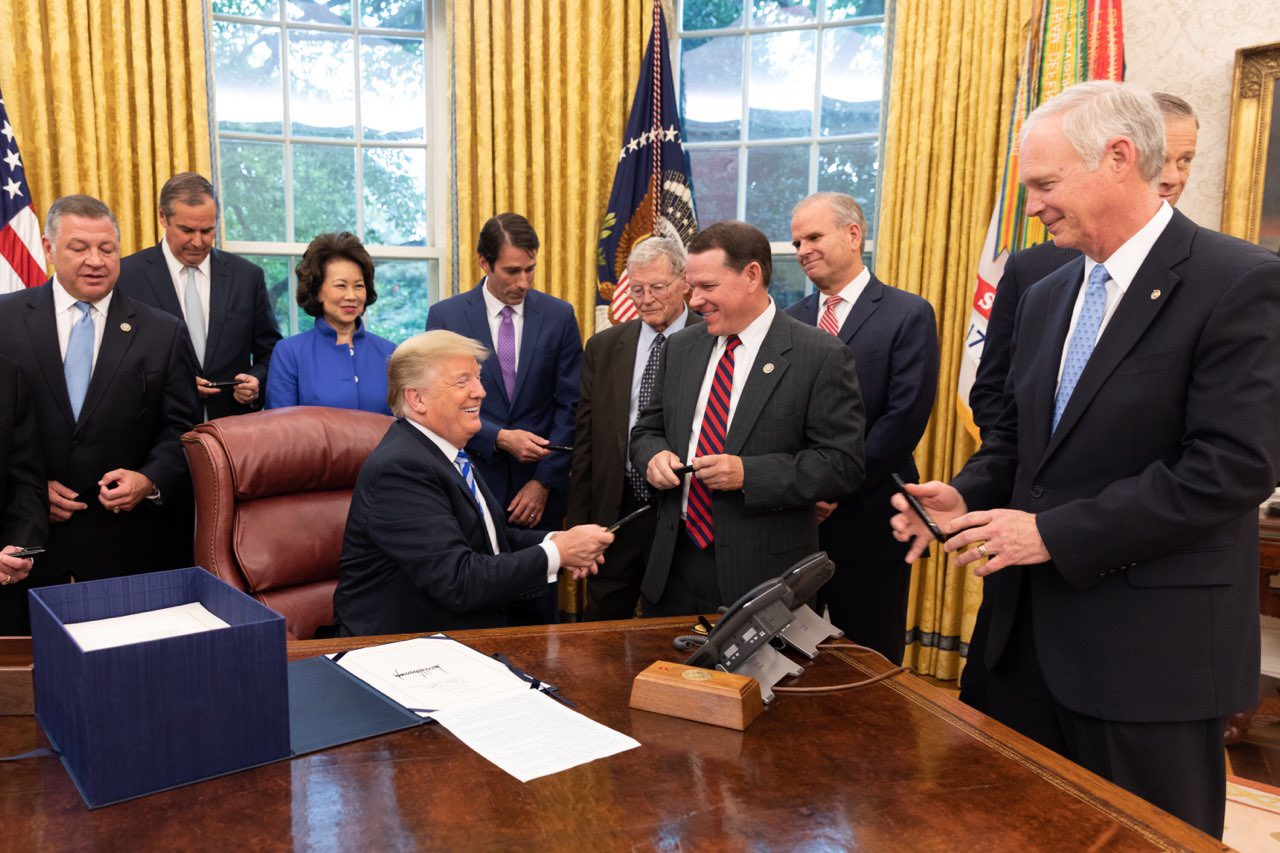
Graves with President Donald Trump at the signing of the FAA bill on October 5, 2018

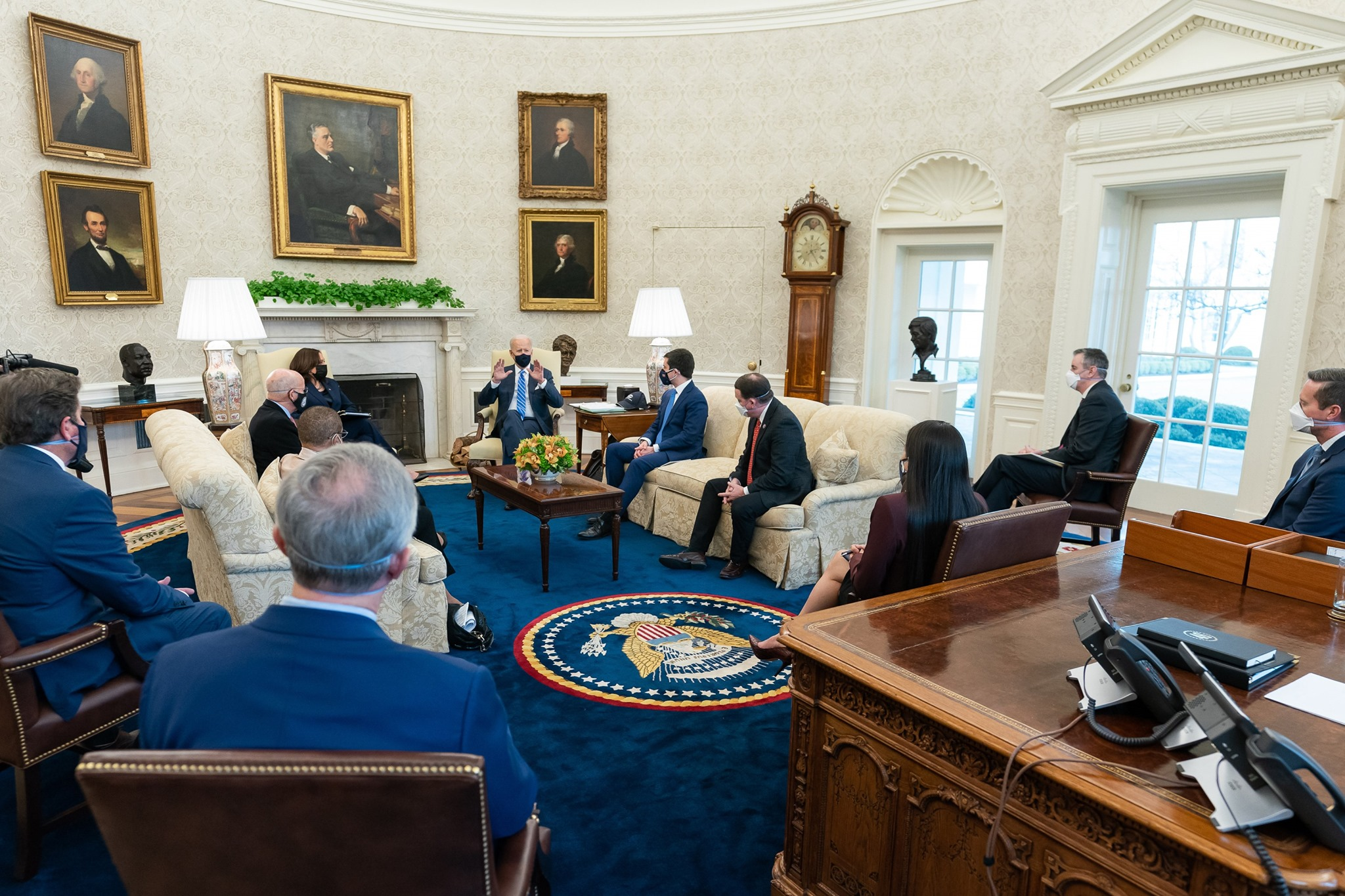
Graves and a bipartisan group of lawmakers from the House Transportation and Infrastructure Committee meet with President Joe Biden on March 4, 2021

In 2000, Democratic U.S. Representative Pat Danner suddenly retired due to breast cancer. Graves filed within the short period of time left for filing. He faced Danner's son, Steve Danner, a former state senator, in the general election. Graves called Danner as a "tax and spend liberal" and won the race with 51% of the vote.

=== 1992 ===
1992 Election for Missouri House of Representatives 4th District
Party	Candidate	Votes	%
Republican	Sam Graves	7,837	56.48%
Democratic	Everett W. Brown	6,038	43.52%
Total votes		13,875	100%

=== 1994 ===
1994 Election for Missouri Senate 12th District
Party	Candidate	Votes	%
Republican	Sam Graves	35,221	60.61%
Democratic	Doug R. Hughes	22,888	39.31%
Total votes		58,109	100%

=== 1998 ===
1998 Election for Missouri Senate 12th District
Party	Candidate	Votes	%
Republican	Sam Graves	31,883	62.69%
Democratic	Beth M. Wheeler	18,974	37.31%
Total votes		50,857	100%

=== 2000 ===
2000 Election for U.S. Representative of Missouri's 6th Congressional District
Primary election
Party	Candidate	Votes	%
Republican	Sam Graves	30,014	68.05
Republican	Teresa Anne Loar	7,493	16.99
Republican	Jeff Bailey	4,575	10.37
Republican	John Dady	1,122	2.54
Republican	Jack C. DeSalms	901	2.04
Total votes		44,105	100
General election
Republican	Sam Graves	138,925	50.85
Democratic	Steve Danner	127,792	46.78
Libertarian	Jimmy Dykes	3,696	1.35
Natural Law	Marie Richey	2,788	1.02
Total votes		273,201	100

=== 2002 ===
2002 Election for U.S. Representative of Missouri's 6th Congressional District
Party	Candidate	Votes	%
Republican	Sam Graves	131,151	63.03
Democratic	Cathy Rinehart	73,202	35.18
Libertarian	Erik Buck	3,735	1.79
Total votes		208,088	100

=== 2004 ===
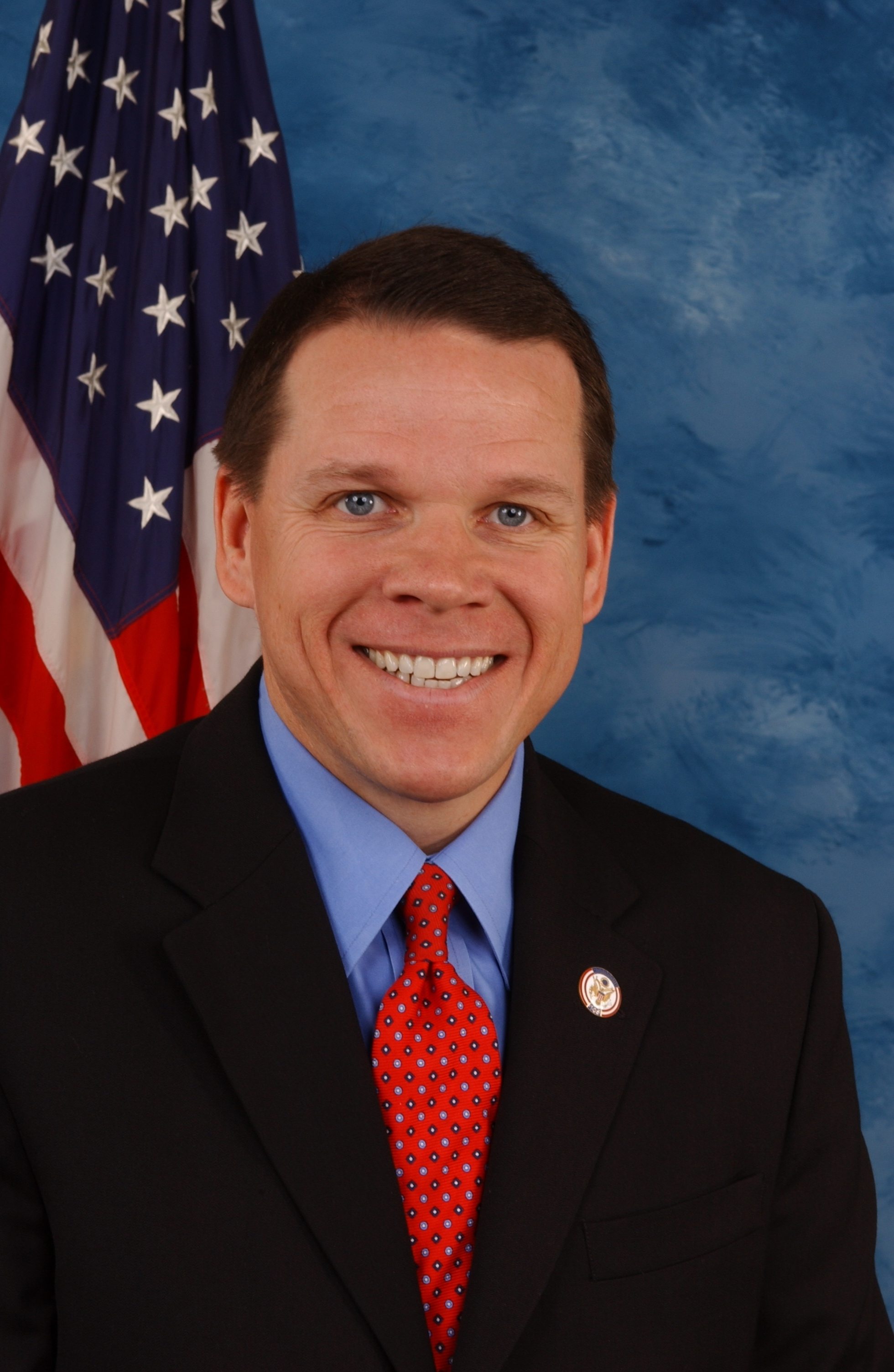
Graves during the 108th Congress

2004 Election for U.S. Representative of Missouri's 6th Congressional District
Party	Candidate	Votes	%
Republican	Sam Graves	196,516	63.83
Democratic	Charles S. Broomfield	106,987	34.75
Libertarian	Erik Buck	4,352	1.41
Total votes		307,855	100

=== 2006 ===
2006 Election for U.S. Representative of Missouri's 6th Congressional District
Party	Candidate	Votes	%
Republican	Sam Graves	150,882	61.64
Democratic	Sara Jo Shettles	87,477	35.73
Libertarian	Erik Buck	4,757	1.94
Progressive Party	Shirley A. Yurkonis	1,679	0.69
Total votes		244,795	100

=== 2008 ===
In 2008, Graves' Democratic challenger was former Kansas City Mayor Kay Barnes. She was the first reasonably well-financed Democrat to run in the district since Graves' initial run. Graves gained national attention early in the race for running an ad accusing Barnes of promoting "San Francisco values". Despite Barnes' roots in the district (she grew up in St. Joseph and lived in the district's share of Kansas City), Graves was reelected handily, with 59% of the vote to Barnes's 37%.

2008 Election for U.S. Representative of Missouri's 6th Congressional District
Party	Candidate	Votes	%
Republican	Sam Graves	196,526	59.43
Democratic	Kay Barnes	121,894	36.86
Libertarian	Dave Browning	12,279	3.71
Total votes		330,699	100

=== 2010 ===
2010 Election for U.S. Representative of Missouri's 6th Congressional District
Primary election
Party	Candidate	Votes	%
Republican	Sam Graves	54,566	82.46%
Republican	Christopher Ryan	11,608	17.53%
Total votes		66,174	100
General election
Republican	Sam Graves	154,103	69.44
Democratic	Clint Hylton	67,762	30.54
Write-In	Kyle Yarber	47	0.02
Total votes		221,912	100

=== 2012 ===
2012 Election for U.S. Representative of Missouri's 6th Congressional District
Primary election
Party	Candidate	Votes	%
Republican	Sam Graves	59,388	80.33%
Republican	Christopher Ryan	9,945	13.45%
Republican	Bob Gough	4,598	6.22%
Total votes		73,931	100
General election
Republican	Sam Graves	216,906	65.00
Democratic	Kyle Yarber	108,503	32.52
Libertarian	Russ Monchil	8,279	2.48
Total votes		333,688	100

=== 2014 ===
2014 Election for U.S. Representative of Missouri's 6th Congressional District
Party	Candidate	Votes	%
Republican	Sam Graves	124,616	66.65
Democratic	Bill Hedge	55,157	29.50
Libertarian	Russ Monchil	7,197	3.85

=== 2016 ===
2016 Election for U.S. Representative of Missouri's 6th Congressional District
Party	Candidate	Votes	%
Republican	Sam Graves	238,388	68.0
Democratic	David Blackwell	98,588	28.4
Libertarian	Russ Monchil	8,123	2.3
Green	Mike Diel	4,241	1.2

=== 2018 ===
2018 Election for U.S. Representative of Missouri's 6th Congressional District
Party	Candidate	Votes	%
Republican	Sam Graves	199,796	65.4
Democratic	Henry Martin	97,660	32.0
Libertarian	Dan Hogan	7,953	2.6

=== 2020 ===
2020 Election for U.S. Representative of Missouri's 6th Congressional District
Party	Candidate	Votes	%
Republican	Sam Graves	258,709	67.1
Democratic	Gena Ross	118,926	30.8
Libertarian	Jim Higgins	8,144	2.1

=== 2022 ===
2022 Election for U.S. Representative of Missouri's 6th Congressional District
Party	Candidate	Votes	%
Republican	Sam Graves	184,865	70.3
Democratic	Henry Martin	72,253	27.5
Libertarian	Edward A (Andy) Maidment	5,774	2.2

=== 2024 ===
2024 Election for U.S. Representative for Missouri's 6th congressional district
Party	Candidate	Votes	%
Republican	Sam Graves (incumbent)	265,210	70.7
Democratic	Pam May	100,999	26.9
Libertarian	Andy Maidment	5,919	1.6
Green	Mike Diel	3,058	0.8
Total votes		375,186	100.0
Republican hold			

== Personal life ==
Graves is a general aviation pilot. He owns a Piper PA-11 Cub Special, is restoring a Beech AT-10, and co-owns a North American T-6 Texan and a Vultee BT-13 Valiant. Gould Peterson Municipal Airport is named after his uncle, an aviator, and is on his family's farm. Graves is a Baptist.

U.S. House of Representatives
Preceded by Pat Danner	Member of the U.S. House of Representatives from Missouri's 6th congressional district 2001–present	Incumbent
Preceded by Steve Chabot	Ranking Member of the House Small Business Committee; 2009–2011	Succeeded by Nydia Velázquez
Preceded by Nydia Velázquez	Chair of the House Small Business Committee; 2011–2015	Succeeded by Steve Chabot
Preceded by Pete DeFazio	Ranking Member of the House Transportation Committee; 2019–2023	Succeeded by Rick Larsen
Preceded by Pete DeFazio	Chair of the House Transportation Committee; 2023–present	Incumbent
U.S. order of precedence (ceremonial)
Preceded by Pete Sessions	United States representatives by seniority 32nd	Succeeded by Rick Larsen
Preceded by Mike Simpson	Order of precedence of the United States	Succeeded by Betty McCollum
