= H. Frank Lawrence =

American football and basketball coach (1897–1970)

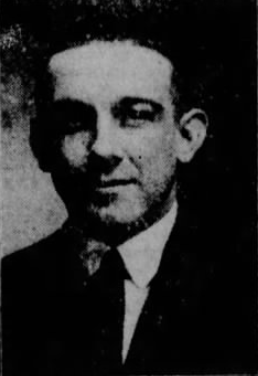
- Lawrence pictured in the Maryville Democrat-Forum, 1923

Biographical details
- Born: December 22, 1897; Gallatin, Missouri, U.S.
- Died: August 7, 1970 (aged 72); San Diego, California, U.S.

Playing career

Football
- c. 1919: Missouri Wesleyan

Coaching career (HC unless noted)

Football
- 1920: McKendree
- 1922: Maryville HS (MO)
- 1923–1926: Northwest Missouri State

Basketball
- 1920–1921: McKendree
- 1922–1923: Maryville HS (MO)
- 1923–1929: Northwest Missouri State

Administrative career (AD unless noted)
- 1922–1923: Maryville HS (MO)
- 1923–?: Northwest Missouri State

Head coaching record
- Overall: 23–9–3 (college football); 68–47 (college basketball)

Accomplishments and honors

Championships
- Football; 2 MIAA (1924–1925)

Henry Franklin Lawrence Jr. (December 22, 1897 – August 7, 1970) was an American football and basketball coach. He served as the head football coach at McKendree College—now known as McKendree University—in Lebanon, Illinois in 1920 and at Northwest Missouri State Teacher's College—now known as Northwest Missouri State University—in Maryville, Missouri from 1923 to 1926, compiling career college football coaching record of 23–9–3. Lawrence was also the head basketball coach at McKendree in 1920–21 and at Northwest Missouri State from 1923 to 1929, tallying a career college basketball coaching mark of 68–47.

Lawrence attended Missouri Wesleyan College in Cameron, Missouri, where he played he played football, basketball, and tennis and was a member of the track. Prior to being appointed athletic director and coach at Northwest Missouri State in 1923, he held the same position at Maryville High School.

Lawrence was the son of U. S. Representative Henry F. Lawrence.

== Head coaching record ==
=== College football ===
Year	Team	Overall	Conference	Standing	Bowl/playoffs
McKendree Bearcats (Illinois Intercollegiate Athletic Conference) (1920)
1920	McKendree	1–3			
Northwest Missouri State:		1–3			
Northwest Missouri State Bearcats (Missouri Intercollegiate Athletic Association) (1923–1926)
1923	Northwest Missouri State	3–3–1			
1924	Northwest Missouri State	6–1–1	3–1	T–1st	
1925	Northwest Missouri State	7–0–1	3–0–1	1st	
1926	Northwest Missouri State	6–2	2–2	3rd	
Northwest Missouri State:		22–6–3			
Total:		23–9–3			
