= Harold Hull =

American basketball player and lawyer

Personal information
- Born: May 16, 1920 Pickering, Missouri
- Died: May 5, 1988 (aged 67) Maryville, Missouri
- Listed height: 6 ft 4 in (1.93 m)
- Listed weight: 190 lb (86 kg)

Career information
- High school: Maryville (Maryville, Missouri)
- College: Northwest Missouri State (1938–1941)
- Position: Forward

Career history
- 1941–1942: Akron Goodyear Wingfoots
- 1942–1943: Akron Collegians

Harold Milton Hull (May 16, 1920 – May 5, 1988) was an American professional basketball player. He played in the National Basketball League for the Akron Goodyear Wingfoots during the 1941–42 season and averaged 1.2 points per game. After his basketball career he earned a juris doctor from the University of Missouri and opened a private practice in Maryville, Missouri.
