= Laredo, Missouri =

- City
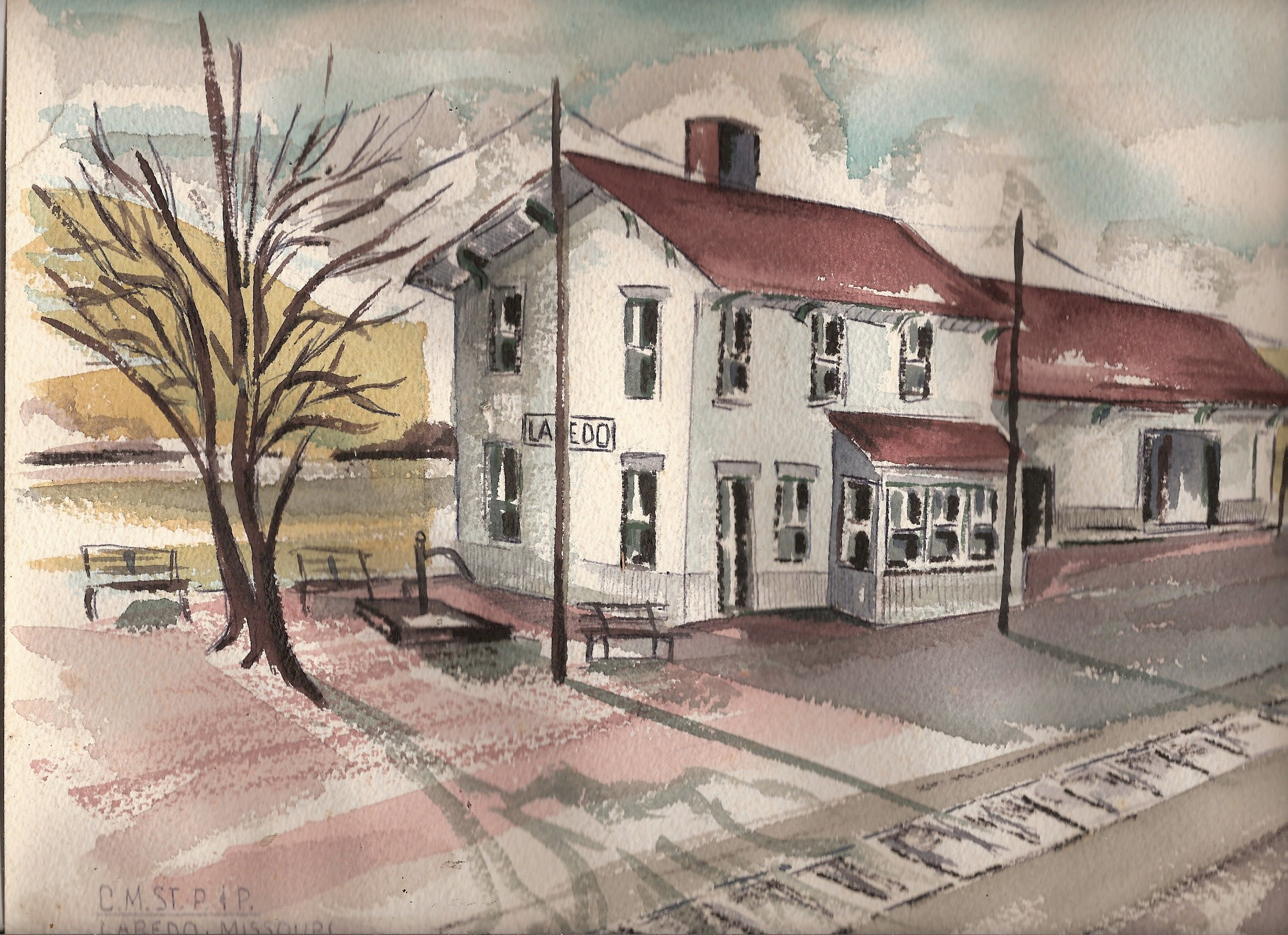
- The former Milwaukee Railroad depot in Laredo. Watercolor by R.L. Huffstutter.

- Location of Laredo, Missouri
- Coordinates: 40°1′34″N 93°26′53″W
- Country: United States
- State: Missouri
- County: Grundy

Area
  - Total: 0.27 sq mi (0.71 km^{2})
  - Land: 0.27 sq mi (0.71 km^{2})
  - Water: 0 sq mi (0.00 km^{2})
- Elevation: 814 ft (248 m)

Population (2020)
  - Total: 156
  - Density: 567/sq mi (218.9/km^{2})
- Time zone: UTC-6 (Central (CST))
  - Summer (DST): UTC-5 (CDT)
- ZIP code: 64652
- Area code: 660
- FIPS code: 29-40736
- GNIS feature ID: 2395634

Laredo is a city in Grundy County, Missouri, United States. The population was 156 at the 2020 census. Laredo is pronounced "la-read-oh" which varies from the traditional pronunciation.

== Geography ==
Laredo is located at the intersection of Missouri routes E and V approximately eight miles southeast of Trenton. Medicine Creek flows past the east side of the community.

According to the United States Census Bureau, the city has a total area of 0.28 square miles (0.73 km^{2}), all land.

== Demographics ==
Historical population
Census	Pop.	Note	%±
1900	286		—
1910	758		165.0%
1920	728		−4.0%
1930	578		−20.6%
1940	1,421		145.8%
1950	426		−70.0%
1960	370		−13.1%
1970	383		3.5%
1980	340		−11.2%
1990	205		−39.7%
2000	250		22.0%
2010	198		−20.8%
2020	156		−21.2%
U.S. Decennial Census

=== 2010 census ===
As of the census of 2010, there were 198 people, 89 households, and 59 families living in the city. The population density was 707.1 inhabitants per square mile (273.0/km^{2}). There were 128 housing units at an average density of 457.1 per square mile (176.5/km^{2}). The racial makeup of the city was 99.5% White and 0.5% from two or more races.

There were 89 households, of which 24.7% had children under the age of 18 living with them, 53.9% were married couples living together, 9.0% had a female householder with no husband present, 3.4% had a male householder with no wife present, and 33.7% were non-families. 28.1% of all households were made up of individuals, and 9% had someone living alone who was 65 years of age or older. The average household size was 2.22 and the average family size was 2.68.

The median age in the city was 47.5 years. 16.2% of residents were under the age of 18; 10.2% were between the ages of 18 and 24; 17.7% were from 25 to 44; 32.9% were from 45 to 64; and 23.2% were 65 years of age or older. The gender makeup of the city was 49.0% male and 51.0% female.

=== 2000 census ===
As of the census of 2000, there were 250 people, 113 households, and 69 families living in the city. The population density was 913.8 inhabitants per square mile (352.8/km^{2}). There were 138 housing units at an average density of 504.4 per square mile (194.7/km^{2}). The racial makeup of the city was 97.20% White, and 2.80% from two or more races. Hispanic or Latino of any race were 0.80% of the population.

There were 113 households, out of which 23.0% had children under the age of 18 living with them, 49.6% were married couples living together, 8.0% had a female householder with no husband present, and 38.9% were non-families. 37.2% of all households were made up of individuals, and 23.9% had someone living alone who was 65 years of age or older. The average household size was 2.21 and the average family size was 2.88.

In the city the population was spread out, with 25.6% under the age of 18, 5.6% from 18 to 24, 24.4% from 25 to 44, 24.4% from 45 to 64, and 20.0% who were 65 years of age or older. The median age was 41 years. For every 100 females, there were 98.4 males. For every 100 females age 18 and over, there were 91.8 males.

The median income for a household in the city was $20,536, and the median income for a family was $29,688. Males had a median income of $23,828 versus $16,250 for females. The per capita income for the city was $12,451. About 13.4% of families and 19.6% of the population were below the poverty line, including 42.2% of those under the age of eighteen and 9.5% of those 65 or over.

== Notable residents ==
- Rex Barnett (born 1938), politician, and former officer of the Missouri State Highway Patrol
- Clyde Tolson (1900–1975), FBI Associate Director
