= Mike Thomson =

American politician

Mike Thomsn

Member of the Missouri House of Representatives from the 1st district
- In office January 2013 – January 2015
- Preceded by: Brad Lager
- Succeeded by: Allen Andrews

Personal details
- Born: April 8, 1946 (age 80) St. Joseph, Missouri
- Party: Republican
- Spouse: Nancy Thomson
- Education: Northwest Missouri State University
- Profession: Teacher, coach.

Mike Thomson (born April 8, 1946) is a Republican former member of the Missouri House of Representatives. Thomson represented the 1st District, encompassing all or portions of Atchison, Holt, Nodaway, and Worth counties in northwest Missouri. Previously this district was known as the 4th. However the 2010 U.S. Census led to redistricting and renumbering across Missouri. Having served in the Missouri House since first being elected in 2006, Thomson is term-limited from running again in 2014.

== Personal history ==
Michael D. Thomson was born in St. Joseph, Missouri and raised in Craig, Missouri, a small community in Holt County. After graduation from Craig High School in 1964, he attended Northwest Missouri State University, earning a bachelor's degree in 1968, and a master's degree in 1971. Thomson was an educator by profession before entering politics, first at Jefferson High School in Conception Junction, Missouri where he was a teacher, counselor and coach for a dozen years, then a further eighteen years at Maryville High School. Mike Thomson returned to his alma mater in 1998 to serve as an instructor and administrator.
Thomson and his wife Nancy are the parents of two grown daughters. They attend Laura Street Baptist Church in Maryville. He is a member of the Missouri Teachers Association, Missouri Retired Teachers Association, and the Maryville Optimist Club.

== Political history ==
Mike Thomson first ran for 4th District State Representative in 2006, defeating Democrat Richard R. Oswald for the right to succeed Brad Lager. In 2008 Thomson again faced off with Oswald and remained victorious. Mike Thomson defeated Skidmore, Missouri farmer Robert L. Ritterbusch in 2010 to win his third term in the Missouri House. Thomson ran unopposed in both the 2012 Republican primary and 2012 general election to win his fourth and final term in the Missouri House. By law he is term-limited from serving further in the House.

Missouri 4th District State Representative Election 2006
Party	Candidate	Votes	%	±%
Republican	Mike Thomson	8,176	63.7	Winner
Democratic	Richard R. Oswald	4,661	36.3	

Missouri 4th District State Representative Election 2008
Party	Candidate	Votes	%	±%
Republican	Mike Thomson	11,266	69.4	Winner
Democratic	Rick Oswald	4,975	30.6	

Missouri 4th District State Representative Election 2010
Party	Candidate	Votes	%	±%
Republican	Mike Thomson	9,442	83.0	Winner
Democratic	Robert L. Ritterbusch	1,934	17.0	

=== Legislative assignments ===
Representative Thomson serves on the following committees during the 97th General Assembly:

- Chair, Higher Education
- Appropriations - Education subcommittee
- Appropriations - Infrastructure and Job Creation subcommittee
- Budget Committee
- Issue Development Standing Committee on Workers Freedom
- Joint Committee on Education

Representative Thomson also served on the House Committee on Elementary and Secondary Education from the beginning of the 2013 1st session until April 25, 2013, when Missouri Speaker of the House Tim Jones removed Thomson and fellow Republican Elaine Gannon from the committee. The action was seen by Missouri political observers as retribution by Jones after the two failed to support Missouri House Bill 631, one of the Speakers' top legislative priorities. It was overwhelmingly voted against by the House, 102–55.
