= Jim Guest =

American politician

James O. Guest

Member of the Missouri House of Representatives from the 5th district
- In office January 8, 2003 – January 3, 2011
- Preceded by: Daniel J. Hegeman
- Succeeded by: Glen Klippenstein

Personal details
- Born: May 20, 1940 (age 86) King City, Missouri
- Party: Republican
- Website: http://www.house.mo.gov/member.aspx?district=005

Jim Guest is an American politician, former aerospace engineer, and former Republican member of the Missouri House of Representatives from District 5.

He was first elected to the Missouri House of Representatives in 2002, winning reelection in 2004, 2006, and 2008. By Missouri term limit law, Guest was ineligible to run again in 2010.

Guest has been a supporter of legislation to address electronic harassment.
