= Serena Sundell =

American basketball player (born 2002)

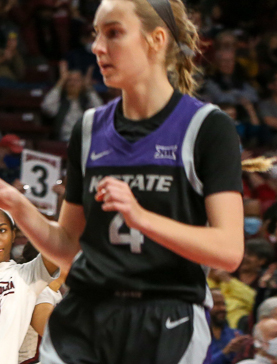
- Sundell with Kansas State in 2021

No. 2 – Adelaide Lightning
- Position: Guard
- League: WNBL

Personal information
- Born: August 29, 2002 (age 24) Maryville, Missouri, U.S.
- Listed height: 6 ft 1 in (1.85 m)

Career information
- High school: Maryville (Maryville, Missouri)
- College: Kansas State (2021–2025)
- WNBA draft: 2025: 3rd round, 26th overall pick
- Drafted by: Seattle Storm

Career history
- 2025: Dallas Wings
- 2025–present: Adelaide Lightning

Career highlights
- 2× First-team All-Big 12 (2024, 2025); Big 12 All-Freshman Team (2022); NCAA season assists leader (2025); Miss Show-Me Basketball (2021)
- Stats at Basketball Reference

Serena Jade Sundell (born August 29, 2002) is an American professional basketball player for the Adelaide Lightning of the Women's National Basketball League (WNBL). She played college basketball for the Kansas State Wildcats. She was selected 26th overall by the Seattle Storm in the 2025 WNBA draft.

== High school career ==
Sundell played basketball for Maryville High School in her hometown of Maryville, Missouri. As a senior, she was named Miss Show-Me Basketball as the top player in Missouri. She left as the program's all-time leading scorer, with 2,358 points. In addition to basketball, Sundell was an all-state player and Class 3 state champion in volleyball, and was a state runner-up in the high jump. During her junior year, she committed to play college basketball for Kansas State.

== College career ==
As a freshman at Kansas State, Sundell averaged 10.6 points, 5.3 assists, and 3.4 rebounds per game. She earned All-Big 12 Conference honorable mention and was unanimously named to the Big 12 All-Freshman Team. On March 1, 2023, she scored a career-high 33 points in a 90–86 overtime loss to AP No. 16 Oklahoma. In her sophomore season, Sundell averaged 13.9 points, 5.1 assists, and 4.8 rebounds per game, receiving All-Big 12 honorable mention. As a junior, she averaged 12.1 points, 5.6 assists, and 3.9 rebounds per game, earning first-team All-Big 12 honors.

On February 5, 2025, Sundell scored a senior season-high 27 points in a 59–50 win over AP No. 9 TCU. On February 22, she set a program single-game record with 15 assists in a 90–60 victory over Kansas. At the end of the regular season, Sundell was named first-team All-Big 12 and made the AP All-American honorable mention. In the second round of the 2025 NCAA tournament, she surpassed Shalee Lehning to become Kansas State's all-time leader in assists, recording 19 points and 14 assists in an 80–79 overtime win over No. 4 seed Kentucky. Sundell led the team to its first Sweet 16 since 2002. In her senior season, she averaged 14.1 points, a nation-best 7.3 assists, and 4.4 rebounds per game.

== Professional career ==
=== WNBA ===
On April 14, 2025, Sundell was drafted in the third round, 26th overall, by the Seattle Storm in the 2025 WNBA draft. On May 12, she was waived by the Storm.

==== Dallas Wings (2025) ====
On August 26, 2025, the Dallas Wings announced that they had signed Sundell to a seven-day hardship contract. She saw limited action in three games with the Wings before her release on September 4.

=== Overseas ===
In August 2025, Sundell signed with the Adelaide Lightning of the Women's National Basketball League (WNBL) for the 2025–26 season.

=== 3x3 ===
On July 20, 2025, Sundell was named to the 2025 USA 3x3 Women’s Nations League Team. From July 21 to 27, She competed in Punta Arenas, Chile, and her team beat Argentina in group play and Canada in the final.

On August 2, 2025, Sundell and her team finished as runners-up at the FIBA 3x3 Women's Series event in Edmonton, Alberta, Canada, on August 1–2.

On September 12, 2025, USA Basketball named Sundell to the team set to compete at the 2025 FIBA 3x3 U23 World Cup, held from Sept. 17-21, in Xiong’an, China.

== Career statistics ==
Legend
GP	Games played	GS	Games started	MPG	Minutes per game	FG%	Field goal percentage	3P%	3-point field goal percentage
FT%	Free throw percentage	RPG	Rebounds per game	APG	Assists per game	SPG	Steals per game	BPG	Blocks per game
TO	Turnovers per game	PPG	Points per game	**Bold**	Career high	*	Led Division I

=== WNBA ===
Stats current through end of 2025 season

WNBA regular season statistics
Year	Team	GP	GS	MPG	FG%	3P%	FT%	RPG	APG	SPG	BPG	TO	PPG
2025	Dallas	3	0	7.3	0.0	0.0	—	0.3	0.0	0.0	0.0	0.7	0.0
**Career**	1 year, 1 team	3	0	7.3	0.0	0.0	—	0.3	0.0	0.0	0.0	0.7	0.0

=== College ===
Year	Team	GP	GS	MPG	FG%	3P%	FT%	RPG	APG	SPG	BPG	TO	PPG
2021–22	Kansas State	33	33	32.3	36.4	35.3	**82.0**	3.4	5.3	1.0	.7	**2.9**	10.6
2022–23	Kansas State	**36**	**36**	**33.4**	48.9	25.3	80.1	**4.8**	5.1	**1.9**	.7	3.4	13.9
2023–24	Kansas State	34	34	32.6	**53.6**	**39.8**	60.2	3.9	5.6	1.2	.7	3.2	12.1
2024–25	Kansas State	**36**	**36**	33.2	50.1	32.0	78.7	4.4	**7.3***	1.1	**.9**	**2.9**	**14.1**
**Career**		139	139	32.9	47.4	33.5	76.3	4.2	5.8	1.3	.7	3.1	12.7

== Personal life ==
Sundell's older brother, Jalen, is a center in the National Football League, who won Super Bowl LX with the Seattle Seahawks, and played college football for North Dakota State. Her father, Bob, played basketball and competed in the high jump at Northwest Missouri State and was inducted into the Hall of Fame for both his school and conference. Sundell's mother, Korena, played basketball for Missouri S&T.
