= Savannah High School (Missouri) =

Location
- 701 W. William St. Savannah, Missouri 64485; United States; 39°56′46″N 94°49′02″W

Information
- Type: Public
- Motto: "Savage Pride" "Savage Nation"
- Principal: Mark Weis
- Teaching staff: 46.30 (FTE)
- Enrollment: 752 (2024-2025)
- Student to teacher ratio: 16.24
- Colors: Black and gold
- Athletics conference: Midland Empire
- Team name: Savages
- Website: www.savannahr3.com/o/high-school

Savannah High School is a public secondary school located in Savannah, Missouri, United States, serving students in grades 9 through 12. Recent additions to the campus include a new commons area, library, and a performing arts center currently under construction. The current principal is Mark Weis.

== Mascot controversy ==
On June 10, 2020, a petition was started on Change.org to remove the Savage mascot due to its racist connotations. The use of terms and images referring to Native Americans and First Nations as the name or mascot for a sports team is a topic of public controversy in the United States and Canada. The American Psychological Association, United States Commission on Civil Rights, and The National Conference for Community and Justice are among those who have called for a ban on Native American mascots. Such mascots are said to misrepresent, distort, and trivialize many aspects of Native American culture; and mascot stereotypes have a negative impact on Native American lives.

A counter-petition was launched on June 29. The Savannah R-III School District's Board of Education met on July 14, 2020, in an open meeting in which community members voiced their opinions on the issue. Previous attempts to change the mascot have been made, notably in 1993 and 2018. On October 14, 2020, the Board of Education voted to create a committee to determine the fate of the mascot. On March 22, 2021, the committee returned with a tie vote, 4-4, in favor of changing or keeping the mascot, pushing the decision back to the school board. Finally, on April 14, 2021, the Savannah R-III School board voted to keep the "Savages" name but phase out the use of Native American imagery, in a 4-3 vote that concluded with one board member resigning on the spot.

== Extracurricular ==
=== Quizbowl ===
Savannah High School has a history of success in quizbowl competitions. The school has won six Missouri state championships. Nationally, the team placed 7th at the ASCN National Tournament of Champions in 2003 and 2004, 5th in 2005, 4th in 1995, and won the national championship in 1988. The program includes both Junior Varsity and Varsity teams, with the JV team winning state titles in 2006 and 2007.

=== Debate and forensics ===
Savannah High School has an active speech and debate program, participating in the Midland Empire Conference and qualifying competitors for state and national tournaments. Notable recent achievements include:

- 2013: Noah Jermain won the Humorous Interpretation event at the NFL National Tournament.

== Notable alumni ==
- Dan Hegeman (1981), Missouri state senator
- Travis Partridge (2009), former professional football quarterback and college football coach
