= Dan Hegeman =

American politician (born 1963)

Member of the Missouri Senate from the 12th district
- In office January 7, 2015 – January 4, 2023
- Preceded by: Brad Lager
- Succeeded by: Rusty Black

Member of the Missouri House of Representatives from the 5th district
- In office January 6, 1993 – January 8, 2003
- Preceded by: Everett Brown
- Succeeded by: Jim Guest

Member of the Missouri House of Representatives from the 6th district
- In office November 1991 – January 6, 1993
- Preceded by: Tim Kelley
- Succeeded by: Bob F. Griffin

Personal details
- Born: March 4, 1963 (age 63) Cosby, Missouri
- Party: Republican
- Spouse: Francine
- Children: 4
- Education: University of Missouri

Daniel Jay Hegeman (born March 4, 1963) is a former Republican member of the Missouri Senate from the 12th district, which covered parts of northwestern Missouri. He was first elected unopposed in 2014.

Hegeman previously served as president of the Andrew County Farm Bureau, member of the Nodaway County Economic Development Board, and member of the Maryville and Savannah Chambers of Commerce. He also served in the Missouri House of Representatives from 1991 until 2003.

== Electoral history ==
=== State representative ===
1991 Special Election for Missouri's 6th House District
Party	Candidate	Votes	%	±%
Republican	Dan Hegeman	4,343	60.29%	
Democratic	Jack Schmidt	2,861	39.71%	
Total votes		7,204	100	

1992 General Election for Missouri's 5th House District
Party	Candidate	Votes	%	±%
Republican	Dan Hegeman	9,137	57.59%	−2.70
Democratic	Marshall W. Pile	6,729	42.41%	+2.70
Total votes		15,866	100	

1994 General Election for Missouri's 5th House District
Party	Candidate	Votes	%	±%
Republican	Dan Hegeman	10,546	100%	+42.41
Total votes		10,546	100	

1996 General Election for Missouri's 5th House District
Party	Candidate	Votes	%	±%
Republican	Dan Hegeman	10,912	72.70%	=27.30
Democratic	Richard W. Dams	4,098	27.30%	+27.30
Total votes		15,010	100	

1998 General Election for Missouri's 5th House District
Party	Candidate	Votes	%	±%
Republican	Dan Hegeman	10,207	100	+27.30
Total votes		10,207	100	

2000 General Election for Missouri's 5th House District
Party	Candidate	Votes	%	±%
Republican	Dan Hegeman	12,308	100	
Total votes		12,308	100	

=== State Senate ===
Missouri's 12th Senate District, 2014
Primary election
Party	Candidate	Votes	%
Republican	Dan Hegeman	21,006	100
General election
Republican	Dan Hegeman	39,006	100
Total votes		39,006	100

2018 General Election for Missouri's 12 Senate District
Party	Candidate	Votes	%	±%
Republican	Dan Hegeman	50,035	72.49%	−27.51
Democratic	Terry Richard	18,986	27.51%	+27.51
Total votes		69,021	100	

== Personal life ==
Hegeman and his wife, Francine, have 4 children; Hannah, Joseph, Heidi, and Joshua. They reside in Cosby, Missouri.

Hegeman graduated from Savannah High School in 1981, and from the University of Missouri in 1985.
