= James Irick =

American sports coach and administrator (1923–1993)

Biographical details
- Born: July 30, 1923; Douthat, Oklahoma, U.S.
- Died: February 18, 1993 (aged 69); Kansas City, Kansas, U.S.

Coaching career (HC unless noted)

Football
- 1956–1962: Baker (assistant)
- 1963–1975: Baker

Basketball
- 1956–1963: Baker

Administrative career (AD unless noted)
- 1975–1991: Baker

Head coaching record
- Overall: 48–64–4 (football)

James S. Irick (July 30, 1923 – February 18, 1993) was an American football, basketball, tennis, and track coach and college athletics administrator. He served as the head football coach at Baker University in Baldwin City, Kansas for 13 seasons, from 1963 to 1975, compiling a record of 48–64–4. He took over the position from longtime coach Karl Spear who moved up to become the school's athletic director.

Irick graduated from high school in Paola, Kansas in 1941. He then attended Baker College, playing football and basketball under head coach Emil Liston. He graduated from Baker in 1948 after a stint in the military and later earned a master's degree from Kansas State Teachers College of Pittsburg,—now known as Pittsburg State University. Irick died of a brain aneurysm, on February 18, 1993, at the University of Kansas Medical Center in Kansas City, Kansas.

== Head coaching record ==
=== Football ===
Year	Team	Overall	Conference	Standing	Bowl/playoffs
Baker Wildcats (Kansas Collegiate Athletic Conference) (1963–1970)
1963	Baker	5–4	5–4	T–4th	
1964	Baker	7–2	7–2	T–3rd	
1965	Baker	6–3	6–3	3rd	
1966	Baker	5–3–1	5–3–1	T–4th	
1967	Baker	6–3	6–3	T–3rd	
1968	Baker	3–6	3–6	T–7th	
1969	Baker	6–3	3–2	T–2nd (North)	
1970	Baker	4–4	4–1	2nd (North)	
Baker Wildcats (Heart of America Athletic Conference) (1971–1975)
1971	Baker	1–6–2	1–5–1	8th	
1972	Baker	0–9	0–7	8th	
1973	Baker	0–10	0–7	8th	
1974	Baker	3–6	1–5	7th	
1975	Baker	2–5–1	1–4–1	6th	
Baker:		48–64–4	45–53–3		
Total:		48–64–4			
