= Lafayette High School (St. Joseph, Missouri) =

American high school in St. Joseph, Missouri

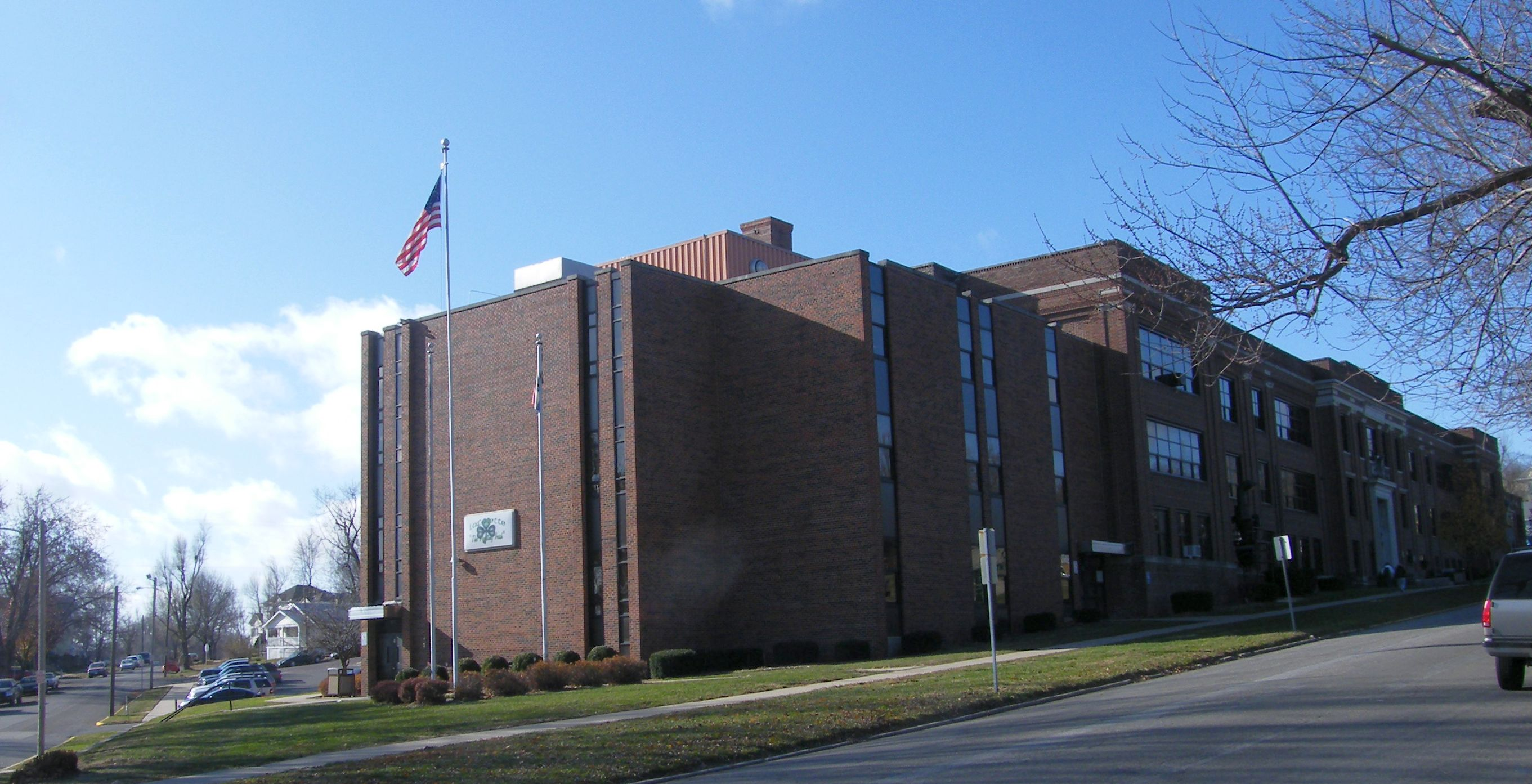
- Lafayette High School in 2009

Location
- 412 Highland Avenue; St. Joseph, Missouri 64505; United States; 39°47′00″N 94°51′16″W

Information
- Former name: North High School
- Established: 1917
- School district: St. Joseph School District
- Principal: Bart Hardy
- Teaching staff: 50.41 (on an FTE basis)
- Grades: 9–12
- Enrollment: 680 (2023–24)
- Student to teacher ratio: 13.49
- Colors: Green and gray
- Athletics conference: Midland Empire
- Nickname: Fighting Irish
- Website: lafayette.sjsd.k12.mo.us

Lafayette High School was a high school (grades 9–12) and now a middle school (7-8) in St. Joseph, Missouri. It was established in 1917 (originally as "North High School"), and at the time was the third high school in the city. The school graduated its final class in 2026 and was converted into a middle school.
