= Bishop LeBlond High School =

High school in Missouri, U.S.

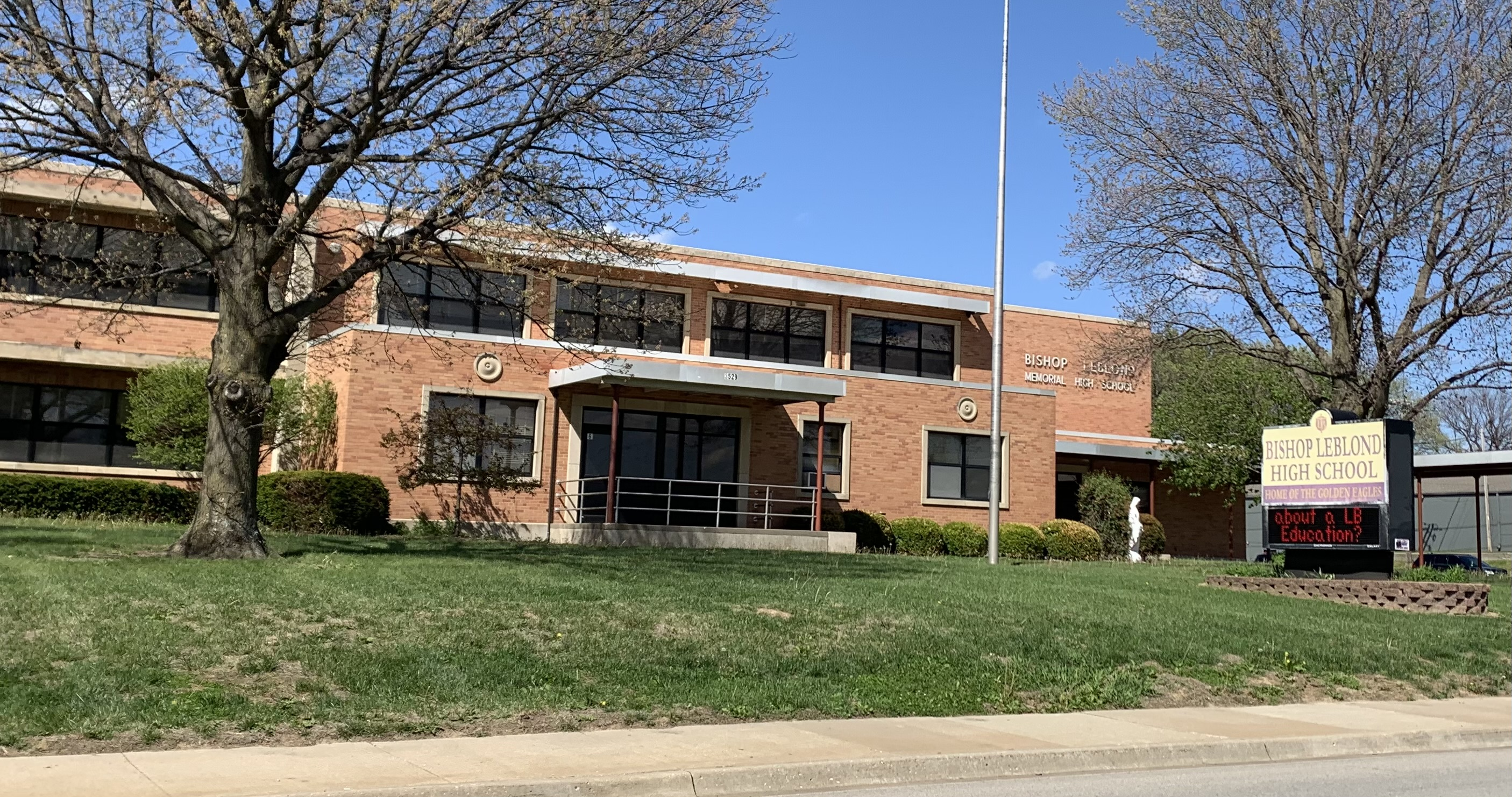

Location
- 3529 Frederick Avenue; St. Joseph, (Buchanan County), Missouri 64506; United States; 39°46′40″N 94°48′27″W

Information
- Type: Private, Coeducational
- Motto: Ut In Omnibus Glorificetur Deus (Latin: That in all things God may be glorified)
- Religious affiliation: Roman Catholic
- Established: 1960; 66 years ago
- Founder: Benedictine Sisters of Mount St. Scholastica
- Principal: Kimberly Huss
- Chaplain: Fr. Garrett King
- Faculty: 20
- Grades: 9–12
- Student to teacher ratio: 11:1
- Color
- Athletics conference: Midland Empire
- Sports: Soccer, Football, Golf, Volleyball, Cross Country, Track, Basketball, Baseball, Swimming, Tennis, Math Team, Science Club and Academic Team, Basketball Cheer, Football Cheer, Softball, Dance,
- Nickname: Eagles
- Rival: St. Pius X Warriors
- Accreditation: North Central Association of Colleges and Schools
- Tuition: $7,600
- Website: www.bishopleblond.org

Bishop LeBlond High School is a private, Roman Catholic high school in St. Joseph, Missouri. It is located in the Roman Catholic Diocese of Kansas City-St. Joseph.

== Background ==
Bishop LeBlond High School was established as an all-girls school in 1960 by the Benedictine Sisters (O.S.B.) of Atchison, KS. It succeeded the Convent of the Sacred Heart (which was located at 12th and Messanie Streets) and the Christian Brothers High School at Noyes and Union (now Bode Middle School) when the Religious of the Sacred Heart (R.S.C.J.) withdrew from St. Joseph. It was named after Bishop Charles H. LeBlond, former Bishop of the diocese. It became coeducational when the all-boys Christian Brothers High School closed in 1970.
