= C. W. Ridgeway =

American football coach

C. W. Ridgway
Biographical details
- Born: November 15, 1900; Missouri, U.S.
- Died: January 1, 1990 (aged 89); Lawrence, Kansas, U.S.
- Education: Emporia State University

Coaching career (HC unless noted)
- 1938–1939: Baker

Head coaching record
- Overall: 5–11–2

Carroll W. Ridgway (November 15, 1900 – January 1, 1990) was an American college football. He served as the head football] coach at Baker University in Baldwin City, Kansas from 1938 to 1939, compiling a record of 5–11–2.
