= Glen Klippenstein =

American politician (born 1937)

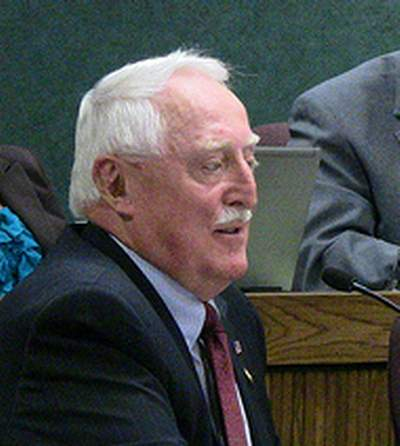

Member of the Missouri House of Representatives from the 5th district
- In office January 2011 – January 7, 2013
- Preceded by: Jim Guest
- Succeeded by: Lindell Shumake

Member of the Missouri Senate from the 12th district
- In office March 1993 – January 1995
- Preceded by: Pat Danner
- Succeeded by: Sam Graves

Personal details
- Born: May 29, 1937 (age 89) Saskatchewan, Canada
- Party: Republican
- Spouse: Linda Klippenstein
- Education: Penn State University
- Profession: Livestock producer

Glen Klippenstein (born May 29, 1937) was a Republican member of the Missouri House of Representatives. Klippenstein represented the 5th District, encompassing all or parts of Buchanan, Clinton, De Kalb and Gentry counties in northwest Missouri. He is also a former interim State Senator for the 12th District.

== Personal history ==
Glen O. Klippenstein was born May 29, 1937, on his grandparents' farm in Saskatchewan, Canada. He attended Academy of the New Church Secondary Schools in Bryn Athyn, Pennsylvania, graduating in 1955. Representative Klippenstein received his higher education at Penn State University, earning a degree in Animal Science in 1959. He moved to Missouri in the 1960s and established GlenKirk Farms, a cattle breeding operation which has sold cattle, semen, and embryos across America and worldwide. Klippenstein has served as chairman of the National Beef Promotion and Research Board, the American Polled Hereford Association, and by Presidential appointment, served on the Federal Ag Mortgage Corporation board of directors. In November, 2000 Klippenstein was named Chief Executive Officer of the American Chianina Association. He and his wife Linda are the parents of four grown children and nine grandchildren.

== Political history ==
Glen Klippenstein served an interim term as a member of the Missouri Senate from 1993 to 1994. He ran for the 5th District House of Representatives in 2010, defeating Ken Gillespie and Glen B. Crowther in the August Republican primary. In the November general election he beat out Democrat Judy Wright and Constitution Party candidate Gary Murray to succeed the term limited Jim Guest.

Missouri 5th District State Representative Election 2010
Party	Candidate	Votes	%	±%
Republican	Glen Klippenstein	7,172	58.4	Winner
Democratic	Judy Wright	4,672	38.1	
Constitution	Gary Murray	431	3.5	

=== Legislative assignments ===
Representative Klippenstein serves on the following committees in the 96th General Assembly:

- Utilities
- Agriculture Policy
- Special Standing Committee on Redistricting
- Workforce Development and Workplace Safety
