= Maryville High School (Missouri) =

Public high school in Maryville, Missouri, United States

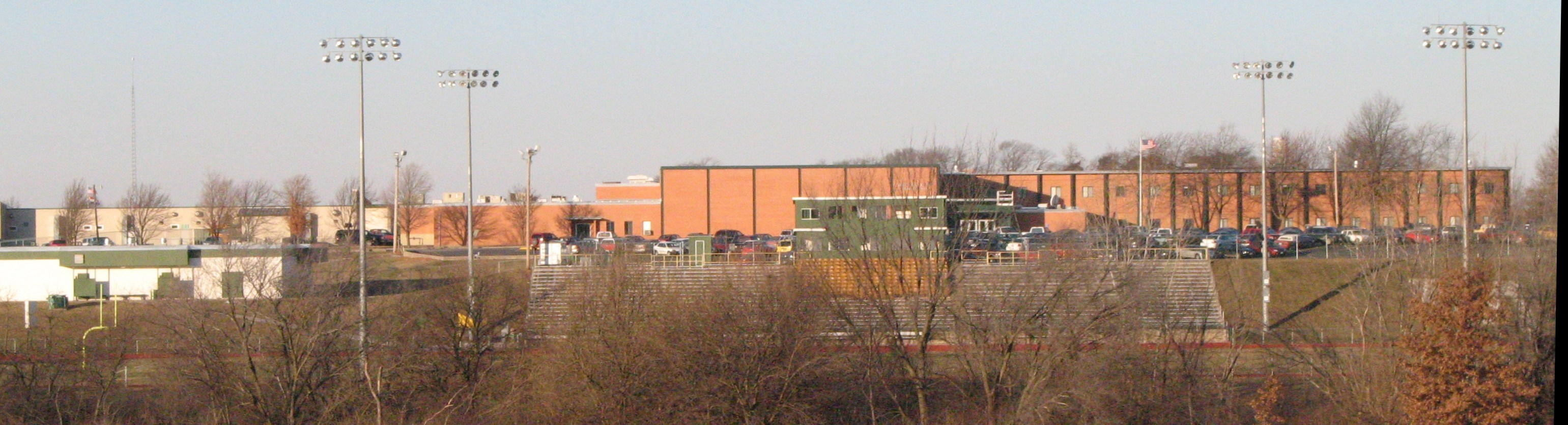

Location
- 1503 South Munn Avenue; Maryville, Missouri; United States; 40.3294°N 94.8821°W

Information
- Type: Public
- Principal: Thom Alvarez
- Teaching staff: 32.10 (FTE)
- Enrollment: 507 (2024–2025)
- Student to teacher ratio: 15.79
- Colors: Green, white, and gold
- Athletics conference: Midland Empire Conference
- Mascot: Spoofhound
- Rival: Chillicothe Hornets
- Website: mhs.maryville.k12.mo.us/o/mhs

Maryville High School is the public high school for Maryville, Missouri. It is the only institution in the United States to have the Spoofhound for a mascot. It is a Missouri State High School Activities Association Class III school. The present high school building on the southwest side of Maryville opened in the 1965–66 school year.

The school is officially Maryville R-II High School. The R-II refers to the 1959 consolidation when 23 school districts voted to reorganize as one district. The reorganization involved the main Maryville school along with 22 rural districts that had one-room schoolhouses. Several other communities in Nodaway County voted in the same election (e.g., R-I, R-II, R-III, etc.) and Maryville was the R-II district in that consolidation.

== History ==
=== Founding 1847–1867 ===
- 1847 – The first school was part of the first courthouse of Nodaway County in Maryville. It was specifically created to be the county seat of Nodaway County because of its central location. The log building was 32 feet by 20 feet and was at Second and Main Streets (a block south of the current courthouse). A new frame court building was subsequently constructed.

=== Washington campus 1867–1965 ===
==== First building 1867–1882 ====
- 1867 – The first school's land, which would become the Washington campus at First and Vine, was acquired and built for $7,000. The school was a 2-story building with four rooms and was both an elementary school and a high school. The average attendance in 1881 was 11 males and 44 females. A description of the campus says "It is located between Wall and Vine Streets, north of and bordering on State Street, fronting west. With the building, there are two acres of ground set in bluegrass and shade trees, the whole presenting a handsome appearance." The school block is staggered off the grid so that all the school buildings would all be situated so they looked head on into the oncoming street which gave it a grand boulevard appearance. Wall Street would subsequently be renamed Dewey and State Street would be renamed First Street once the Maryville numbered streets took effect in the 1880s. The school property over the years would push further east eventually tripling the acreage of the initial area.
- 1874 – An all-black Frederick Douglass school was created. It would never be incorporated into the traditional Maryville High School and would dissolve in 1934.
- 1882 – James B. Prather pays $1,200 to acquire the remains of the torn down the school to be used to build a stable to house 120 horses and being one of the biggest stables in Missouri. Prather is owner of Faustiana Farms noted for its racing horse breeding—notably Elwood which won the 1901 Kentucky Derby and Faustus which was great-grandfather of Black Gold which won the 1924 Derby. Prather was one of the original 1868 founders of Nodaway Valley Bank.

==== Second building 1882–1908 ====
- 1882 – The new school was constructed for $43,000. The new two-story building had 12 rooms.
- 1894 – Maryville's system of elementary schools, dubbed ward schools was created with the Thomas Jefferson school at 1st and Charles; James A. Garfield school at Thompson and Mulberry; and Benjamin Franklin school at 7th and North Main (now site of Franklin Park). The elementary school by the new building was in a small white building (dubbed the White House) and called the George Washington school. The high school area was referred to in news reports as Central or Central High School.
- 1906 – The first classes of the Fifth District Normal School (which became Northwest Missouri State University) were held in the school while preparations for the new buildings for the campus were underway.
- 1908 – Janitor W.L. Robey fell into a pool of boiling water that had leaked from the furnace while trying to fix the building furnace. He pulled himself out and finished the repairs, went to the superintendent to report the problem, and then walked two blocks to his room, where he died from the scalding.

==== Third building 1908–1965 ====
- 1908 – The second building was torn down, and the white house grade school moved to a residence. A bond issue for $75,000 resulted in the construction of a three-story building, with the basement being used by the high school and the first floor by the Washington grade school. Gymnasiums were on opposite sides of the building, with boys on one side and girls on the other. The gymnasiums had no seats. It was designed by Maryville architect A.A. Searcy (Alexander A. Searcy 1852–1916) who designed more than 100 churches in northwest Missouri and southeast Iowa. he designed the Burlington Junction school and the Elks Club on Main Street. The design was to follow the earlier structure closely but make major improvements to ventilation.
- 1921 – A gymnasium was added to the north side
- 1923 – Football coach Leslie Edward Ziegler (1894–1957) called his team a bunch of Spoofhounds. The name stuck and became the mascot.
- 1931 – Construction of the new $108,000 Eugene Field elementary school on land just east of the high school. The new school consolidates the four elementary schools into one school. The Washington name becomes the name of the high school (although in news reports of school games, the high school is always referred to as Maryville High School).
- 1934 – Frederick Douglass's all-black school formally dissolved due to a lack of students.
- 1934 – On October 23 a tornado hit the school about 5:30 p.m. during football practice. Under coach Wallace Croy, the team went from the practice field adjoining the school to the dressing rooms on the north wing, which had its roof ripped off. The school was held at churches and other buildings in Maryville during repairs. The tornado killed five at a Civilian Conservation Corps camp at what today is Beal Park, which was six blocks northeast of the school (Beal Park would later be a football venue for the school after moving from a field adjacent to the high school). The CCC was building grain elevators (and not the park). Harry S. Truman was campaigning in Maryville at the courthouse for U.S. Senate at about the time of the storm.
- 1937 – Undefeated Maryville defeats Central High School (Springfield, Missouri) 51–27 to win the Missouri state basketball championship at a time when there were no divisions in the state. Maryville placed third in the state tournaments in 1936 and 1938 also when there were no divisions.
- 1937 – Maryville, Tarkio, Mound City, and Savannah begin playing in the Northwest Missouri Conference. Maryville would stay in the conference until 1962.
- 1942 – Harlem Globetrotters play local team dubbed the Shamrocks in two games in the gymnasium (beating the locals in the rematch 34–30).
- 1953 – A cafeteria was added to the Eugene Field building to feed the elementary and high school students on a staggered schedule. Students from the high school walked in all weather, at the block-long distance from the high school to the elementary school, for meals.
- 1953 – The Varsity football team played its first night home game under the newly installed lights at Beal Park. This is a change from playing home games in the bowl field by the high school. One of Beal Park's most unique features is that it is designed so that parking on top of a hill overlooking the field in the 102 River bottoms permits spectators to watch the game inside their cars.
- 1959 – Voters in Maryville and the surrounding 22 rural schools approve "reorganization" of the county school system to roll the 22 rural schools into the Maryville school district. The consolidation would start Maryville on the path of looking for a bigger school. The consolidation would also prompt the college to close its Horace Mann High School.
- 1961 – The varsity basketball teams began playing their home games in the newly built Bearcat Arena (then called Lamkin Gym) after outgrowing the limited seating of the Washington School gym.
- 1962 – Maryville, which had been playing much smaller neighboring rural schools in the Northwest Missouri Conference, is a founding member of the Midland Empire Conference, which pits it against more comparably sized schools in Savannah and St. Joseph.
- 1963 – High school varsity teams begin playing most home games at Bearcat Stadium (then called Rickenbrode Stadium/Memorial Stadium). The practice field and junior varsity continue to play at Beal Park. They would eventually play all of most of their home games at the stadium until the new field by the high school opened in 1976.
- 1965 – The last class graduates. The school is repurposed as a middle school, with the 5th and 6th grades moving from Eugene Field to join the 7th and 8th grades that had been in the Washington school before.
- 1998 – The building is torn down to make way for a new middle school adjoining the south campus. Portions of the auditorium's classical plaster relief are displayed at the Nodaway County Historical Society Museum.
- 2018 – The school district ends its 151-year ownership of the Washington school property by selling it to the city of Maryville for a new $4 million Maryville Public Safety police and fire headquarters. The Eugene Field elementary school on the east end of the property continues its education mission.

=== South campus 1965–present ===
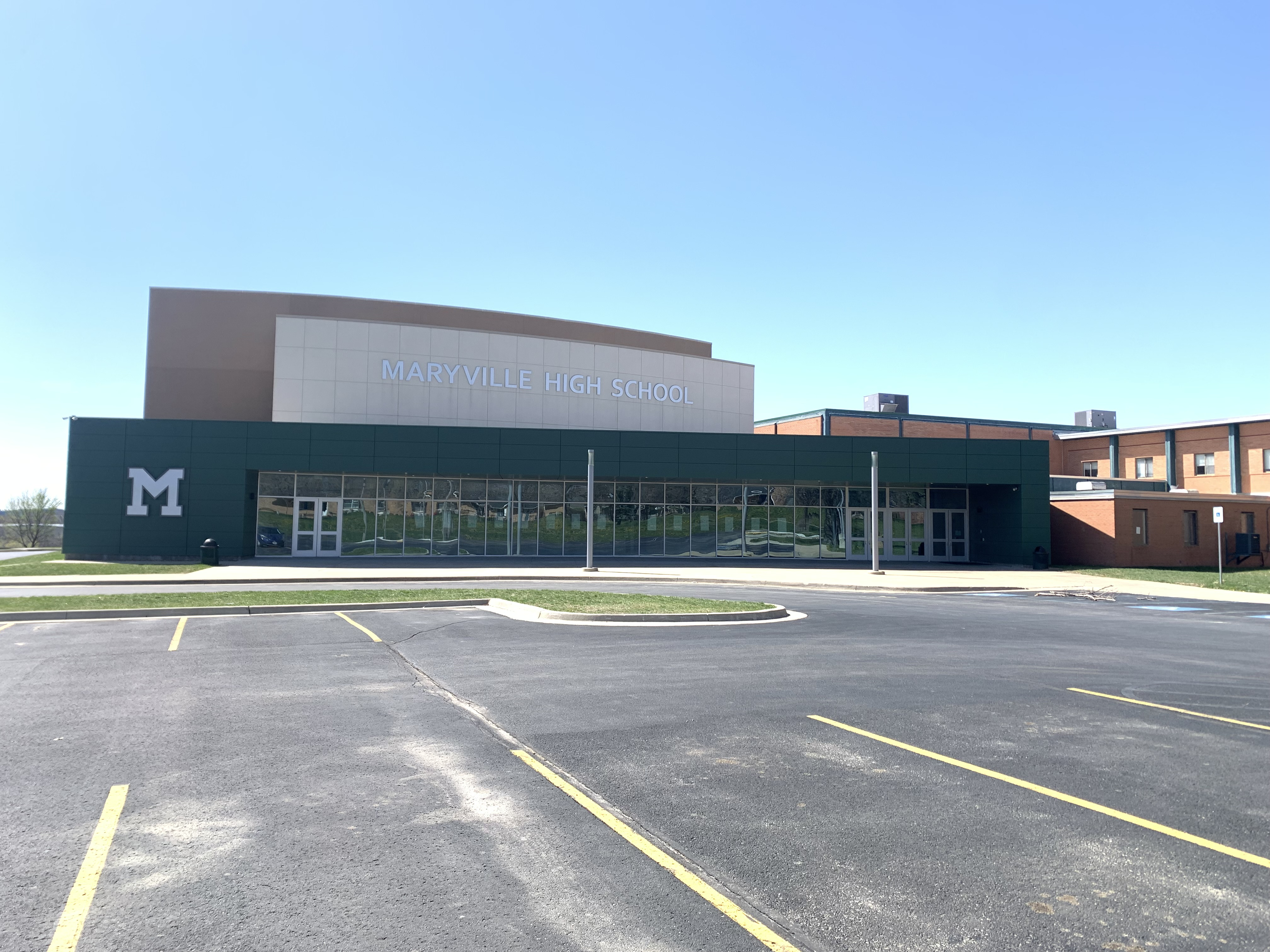

- 1965 – After constructing a new school on the south campus, the last class to graduate is 1965. The cost for construction was $950,000. The bond issue was approved in March 1963. The cost of the original 40 acres was $31,000, and school officials said it would have cost $150,000 if they had to condemn land around the Washington school. The original footprint was 64,300 square feet and on a 40-acre campus. Among other considered locations were expanding at the original location, Washington location, and just west of the Northwest Missouri State University campus. Joe Radotinsky is the architect. Radotinsky was the architect of several schools and office buildings throughout the Midwest several of which are on the National Register of Historic Places including Wyandotte High School, Sumner Academy of Arts & Science, the American Hereford Association headquarters (now HNTB headquarters). A Hereford bull, which has become a Kanas City landmark, was part of the design. The Richard Bolling Federal Building in Kansas City, which he designed, was completed in 1965, the same year as the high school. Among the additions was a gymnasium where the school could play its home basketball games. Home varsity games had been played at Bearcat Arena after it opened in 1959 rather than in the limited confines of the old Washington School gymnasium.
- 1970 – The vocational school building opened south of the main building.
- 1976 – Football field (dubbed the Hound Pound) opens down the hill east of the high school, ending an era when games were played at Bearcat Stadium. The field was made possible by the approval of a $340,000 bond issue to build it.
- 1977 – "M" is placed on the banks of the field.
- 1999 – Middle school opens about a quarter-mile southeast of high school but is connected via a trail to the high school. Washington School is torn down.
- 2006 – The school moved from its traditional medium-size Class 3 category to Class 2. It was runner-up in the state championship football in 2008 and won the title in 2009.
- 2010 – School moved back to Class 3
- 2016 – Lee and Nina Schneider Performing Arts Center opens on the east side, towering over the school, prompting the school to switch its official entrance from the east side to the west side. It is named after Lee Schneider, who directed the school band for many years. It is 19,000 square feet and seats 698 people. Concerts had been held in the gymnasium. The earlier Washington school building had a separate auditorium. Schneider (1926–2013) taught music at the school from 1960 to 1992 and developed the Marching Spoofhounds into a powerhouse that performed at half time in 1973 of a Kansas City Chiefs football game and made a 1990 appearance in the Macy's Thanksgiving Parade in 1990.
- 2019 – School drops back to Class 2.
- 2020 – School moves back to Class 3.
- 2024 – Football, softball, and soccer fields east of the school have brightly colored Artificial turf installed at $2.5 to $3 million. In addition, Nodaway Valley Bank paid to build a video Daktronics scoreboard on the 50-yard line on the east side of the football field (replacing the scoreboard beyond the end zone on the south side). Maryville also painted one of its water towers on Edwards Street a mile northwest of the school in school colors and put the school logo on it.

== Athletics ==
The school's original colors were red and white. When Northwest Missouri State University opened in 1905, the college colors were red and white. The college changed its colors to green and white. The high school later changed its colors to green and white and then to green and gold. Maryville High School football games were played initially by the school at First and Vine, from 1953 to 1962 were played at the football field at Beal Park east of the municipal swimming pool (now the Aquatics Center) and then mostly at Bearcat Stadium from 1963 to 1975 on the college campus. In late 1976 the high school began playing its football games in a stadium on its own campus which has been nicknamed the "Hound Pound".

Since 1962, Maryville has played in the Midland Empire Conference. From 1937 to 1962 it played in the Northwest Missouri Conference.

State Championships

- 1937 - Men's Basketball (no divisions at the time)
- 1971 - Wrestling (AAA)
- 1972 - Wrestling (AAA)
- 1982 - Football (AAA)
- 1982 - Baseball (AAA)
- 2000 - Men's Golf (AAA)
- 2009 - Football (Class 2)
- 2012 - Football (Class 3)
- 2013 - Football (Class 3)
- 2017 - Football (Class 3)
- 2020 - Women's Volleyball (Class 3)

Runners Up

- 1959 - Men's Basketball (M)
- 1981 - Men's Baseball (AA and AAA)
- 1984 - Football (AAA)
- 1985- Wrestling (1A-2A)
- 1995 - Men's Basketball (AAA)
- 1996 - Football (AAA)
- 2001 - Men's Golf (AAA)
- 2004 - Men's Basketball (Class 3)
- 2008 - Football (Class 2)
- 2011 - Men's Golf (Class 2)
- 2011 - Women's Golf (Class 1)
- 2016 - Football (Class 3)
- 2017 - Men's Track and Field (Class 3)
- 2020 - Football (Class 3)

== Maryville Marching Spoofhounds ==
The school's marching band has won many awards. It has gained national recognition in its past years, including appearing on the Today Show before marching in the Macy's Thanksgiving Day Parade in 1990. They have been invited to march in the New Year's Day Parade in London, United Kingdom. In 2008, they were asked to the National Adjudicator's Convention (The Dixie Classics) in Chicago, Illinois. They have also participated in the Independence Day Parade in Washington, DC. In the 1980s–90's over a third of the student body was involved in the Spoofhound Marching Band. In 2011, the Marching Spoofhounds marched in a Magic Kingdom Parade at Disney World in Orlando, Florida.

== Mascot ==
Spoofhound today

The school mascot, Spoofhound, is based on a Plaster of Paris souvenir mascot that was distributed in 1921 during the American Legion convention in Kansas City, Missouri that was held in conjunction with the dedication of the Liberty Memorial. That mascot was based on a drawing by World War I veteran James D. Laingor who made a drawing that was a compilation of 20 photographs of mascot dogs of various World War I units. Laingor copyrighted the image of "Spoof hound and Goof" in 1921. The image was turned into a statue which Laingor sold via his company "Spoof Hound Novelty Company" at Room 360, 2006 Central Street, Kansas City, Missouri. The headline of its advertisement in American Legion Magazine said, "Meet the Spoof-Hound, the ugliest critter in existence." The text said, "You buddies coming to Kansas City are going to meet the onliest looking Son-of-A-Gun that ever came down a Company street. He's the Spoof-Hound." Laingor was a University of Missouri Journalism School student and said he had originally used the name to describe his coffee club.

Spoofhound statues left over from the convention were sold at carnivals in 1922.

Leslie Edward Ziegeler (1894–1957), who coached high school team said his players looked like a bunch of Spoofhounds. The name stuck and as the 1923 football season began the team was called the Spoofhound by the Maryville Daily Forum.

In the 1940s, Ziegler became the superintendent of schools for Columbia, Missouri where the mascot is also named for an early 20th-century doll—the Kewpies. The image of the Spoofhound has evolved over the years. From the 1950s to the mid-1970s, drawings of it showed a softer more filled out creature called Spoofy.

In 1977 the "Hi Lights" the high school publication which appeared weekly in the Forum ran a contest entitled, "Spoofy - Does he have a face?" in which they sought a redesign to a more aggressive Spoofhound. The winner of this contest was the school art instructor Brian L. Lohafer. Lohafer was also a coach and he led the football Spoofhounds to state championship appearances in 1984, 1994, 1996 and a basketball state championship appearance in 1995. A variation of the mascot he designed is still the mascot of the school.

ESPN recognized the Spoofhound as one of its top mascot names and enshrined the Spoofhound in their "Mascot Hall of Fame." As of 2016, no other academic institution or sports club had adopted the nickname.

== Notable alumni ==
- Dale Carnegie (attended system through 1904) - motivational author (attended Rose Hill one room school near Bedison, Missouri that would be consolidated into the high school)
- Charles J. Colden (Class of 1888) - U.S. Representative from California
- Edwin H. Colbert (Class of 1923) - paleontologist
- Daisy Coleman (attended in 2012) - student whose sexual assault was topic of Netflix documentary Audrie & Daisy which was filmed at the school
- Homer Croy (Class of 1901) - screenwriter who wrote about Maryville
- Forrest C. Donnell (Class of 1900) - governor of Missouri and U.S. Senator
- Adam Dorrel (Class of 1993) - head coach of Abilene Christian football; formerly coach of Northwest Missouri State Bearcats
- Harold Hull (Class of 1938) - Akron Goodyear Wingfoots professional basketball player was on the 1937 team that won the state championship when there were no divisions.
- Bud Millikan (Class of 1938) - University of Maryland basketball coach who was on the 1937 Maryville state championship basketball team that played at a time when there were no divisions in the state tournament Millikan later coached high school ball at Maryville.
- Merrill E. Otis (Class of 1902) Missouri Western District federal judge most famous for sentencing Kansas City Political Boss Thomas J. Pendergast to Leavenworth Federal Prison in 1939.
- Steve Schottel (Class of 1966) - coach of Baker University Wildcats and 1970 assistant football coach.
- Jim Spainhower (Class of 1946) - Missouri State Treasurer
- Bill Stauffer (Class of 1948) - first University of Missouri basketball player to have his number retired by school and first-round draft pick of Boston Celtics
- Jalen Sundell (Class of 2018) - NFL offensive tackle for the Seattle Seahawks (brother of Serena)
- Serena Sundell (Class of 2021) WNBA player for Seattle Storm (sister of Jalen)
- Bill Tobin (Class of 1959) - NFL general manager of Chicago Bears and Indianapolis Colts (played on the 1959 basketball team that was undefeated until losing the state class M title game).
- Vince Tobin (Class of 1961) - head coach of Arizona Cardinals (brother of Bill Tobin - both played multiple sports at the high school at the same time). Both commuted to Maryville from Burlington Junction, Missouri.

== Notable faculty ==
- H. Frank Lawrence - Football coach in the 1920s and who became Northwest Missouri football coach.
- Bud Millikan - Maryville grad who went on to coach basketball and football for two years in the 1940s before going on to coach basketball at University of Maryland.
- Steve Schottel Maryville grad who was head coach of Baker University Wildcats and 1970 student teacher in the football program.
- Jeff Simms - Football coach in 1995 who went on to coach various teams including the 2016 Garden City team which won the NJCAA National Football Championship.
- Mike Thomson - Coach and instructors in the 1980s and 1990s who became Missouri State Representative

== Other Maryville high schools ==
Following the closing of the Missouri Academy in 2018, Maryville High School is the only high school remaining in the community. In addition to the schools listed below the Maryville system also historically had 22 rural one-room school houses that were consolidated in 1959.

- Missouri Academy of Science, Mathematics and Computing (2000–2018), a school associated with Northwest Missouri State University and on the college campus that was devoted college preparation for juniors and seniors. It was closed because it was no longer considered financially viable. Students lived in the dormitories in the North Complex (Cooper Hall and Douglas Hall) which also house the classrooms.
- Mount Alverno High School (1963–1971), Catholic girls' school built on the grounds of the Sisters of St. Francis motherhouse east of Maryville on Highway 46. Its building is now part of the Maryville Treatment Center. The school started with a single class in 1960 and when it formally opened its new structure in 1963 with an enrollment of 109. The school was designed to handle 250 and included a dormitory for students from all over the world.
- Horace Mann High School (1923–1960), a "teaching laboratory" for Northwest Missouri teachers college. It originally operated in the college Administration Building. In 1939 a new building was built just east of what today is Bearcat Arena and just west of the J.W. Jones Student Union. The school building today is still an elementary school and is in what is called the Horace Mann Laboratory School. The high school team placed second in the 1956 Class M state championship game. The school dissolved after Maryville consolidated its school system effective 1960. The school mascot was the Cubs.
- St. Patricks High School (1910–1937) - Catholic high school associated with the Atchison, Kansas, Benedictine Sisters at Highway 46 (First Street) and Buchanan. The building was subsequently used as a K-8 through for St. Gregory's School until a new school was built near the new St. Gregory's Church in 1963. The building was converted into the Carson Apartments and was destroyed in a catastrophic fire in 2007 that killed two. In 1929 the co-ed school graduated 9 students.
- Frederick Douglass School (1872–1934) - Maryville's separate but equal one-room K-12 school with an area of 20 foot by 20 foot. It was originally called School No. 3. Although having a relatively small number of students, residents on multiple instances voted against integrating it. It was located at Water and East Jenkins on Maryville's east side. Maryville's black population in 1931 dwindled very quickly following after a mob burned Raymond Gunn alive atop the one-room rural school Garrett school house where he was accused of killing white school teacher Velma Cutler. The school still stands and is a house.

== See also ==
- Audrie & Daisy
- Education in Missouri
- List of colleges and universities in Missouri
- List of high schools in Missouri
- Missouri Department of Elementary and Secondary Education
