= Emil Liston =

American athletic coach and administrator (1890–1949)

Biographical details
- Born: August 21, 1890; Stockton, Missouri, U.S.
- Died: October 26, 1949 (aged 59); Baldwin, Kansas, U.S.

Playing career

Football
- c. 1912: Baker

Baseball
- 1914: Emporia Bidwells
- 1916: Wichita Witches / Colorado Springs Millionaires

Coaching career (HC unless noted)

Football
- 1918–1919: Wesleyan
- 1920–1937: Baker
- 1940–1942: Baker

Basketball
- 1911–1913: Baldwin HS (KS)
- 1918–1920: Wesleyan
- 1920–1946: Baker

Administrative career (AD unless noted)
- 1916–1918: Michigan Mines
- 1918–1920: Wesleyan
- ?–1946: Baker

Head coaching record
- Overall: 107–69–18 (college football); 239–211 (college basketball)

Accomplishments and honors

Championships
- Football; 7 KCAC (1922, 1927–1928, 1934, 1937, 1941–1942)
- Basketball Hall of Fame; Inducted in 1975 (profile)
- College Basketball Hall of Fame; Inducted in 2006

Emil Smith "Liz" Liston (August 21, 1890 – October 26, 1949) was an American athletic coach and administrator. He coached basketball, football and baseball at Wesleyan University and Baker University. He was the founder of the National Association of Intercollegiate Athletics, organized the NAIA college basketball tournament in 1937 and served as the first executive director of the National Association of Intercollegiate Basketball (predecessor to the NAIA) from 1940 to 1949. He was posthumously inducted into the Naismith Memorial Basketball Hall of Fame in 1975.

== Early years ==
A native of Stockton, Missouri, Liston attended Baker University in Kansas. From 1916 to 1918, he was the athletic director at Michigan College of Mines (which is now known as Michigan Technological University). According to some accounts, he also played football at Michigan College of Mines.

== Wesleyan ==
In September 1918, Liston was hired by Wesleyan University as coach of the school's football team. He left Wesleyan in June 1919 to play professional baseball for the Wichita, Kansas team in the Western League. After spending the summer playing baseball in Wichita, Liston returned to Wesleyan as the head football coach in the fall of 1919. In two years as Wesleyan's football coach, Liston compiled a 10–3 record. His .769 winning percentage at Wesleyan remains the highest of any Wesleyan football coach with at least ten games as coach. Liston also coached the basketball and baseball teams at Wesleyan. In April 1920, Liston announced his resignation from Wesleyan.

== Baker ==
After resigning from Wesleyan, Liston announced he was through with the coaching profession and that it was his intention to move to Kansas to work on the farm of his father-in-law.

He returned to coaching in 1920 with Baker University in Baldwin City, Kansas. He coached both football and basketball at Baker. He was the coach of the basketball team from 1930 to 1945 and led the school to Kansas Conference championships in 1930 and 1937. He also coached Baker's football teams and was for many years the school's winningest football coach with 97 wins; the career wins record was broken in 1992 by Charlie Richard.

The university named their football stadium Liston Stadium in his honor.

== NAIA/NAIB ==
Liston was also the founder of the National Association of Intercollegiate Athletics, organized the NAIA college basketball tournament, and a close friend of James Naismith. In 1945, Liston resigned his coaching position at Baker University to become the NAIB's first executive director; he held that position until his death in 1949. He was inducted into the Naismith Memorial Basketball Hall of Fame in 1975. Liston's biography at the Basketball Hall of Fame states: "With sheer initiative, drive, and foresight, Emil Liston fought for uniformity and equality in college athletics. A dedicated administrator, Liston envisioned a small college, national tournament and organized the NAIB (now known as the NAIA). The first NAIA tournament was played in Kansas City with an eight-team field in 1937."

== Later years and death ==
Liston died of a heart attack, on October 26, 1949, while reading at his home in Baldwin, Kansas.

== Head coaching record ==
=== College football ===
Year	Team	Overall	Conference	Standing	Bowl/playoffs
Wesleyan Methodists (Independent) (1918–1919)
1918	Wesleyan	4–2			
1919	Wesleyan	6–1			
Wesleyan:		10–3			
Baker Wildcats (Kansas Collegiate Athletic Conference) (1920–1937)
1920	Baker	5–4	4–3	T–5th	
1921	Baker	5–3–1	4–3–1	T–6th	
1922	Baker	8–1	7–1	1st	
1923	Baker	4–1–4	3–1–4	T–4th	
1924	Baker	4–5	3–5	T–11th	
1925	Baker	4–3–1	3–3–1	T–8th	
1926	Baker	3–3–2	2–3–2	10th	
1927	Baker	7–0–1	6–0–1	T–1st	
1928	Baker	6–0–2	5–0–2	1st	
1929	Baker	5–3–1	2–2–1	3rd	
1930	Baker	5–4	4–1	2nd	
1931	Baker	2–5–2	1–2–1	T–4th	
1932	Baker	4–4–1	2–2	3rd	
1933	Baker	2–7	1–3	4th	
1934	Baker	4–4–1	4–1	T–1st	
1935	Baker	3–4–2	3–1–1	2nd	
1936	Baker	2–6	1–4	5th	
1937	Baker	5–4	4–1	1st	
Baker Wildcats (Kansas Collegiate Athletic Conference) (1940–1942)
1940	Baker	5–3	4–2	2nd	
1941	Baker	7–2	5–1	1st	
1942	Baker	7–0	6–0	1st	
Baker:		97–66–18	74–39–14		
Total:		107–69–18			
National championship Conference title Conference division title or championship game berth
