= Steve Schottel =

American football player and coach (born 1948)

Biographical details
- Born: 1948 (age 77–78)

Playing career
- c. 1970: Northwest Missouri State
- Position: Quarterback

Coaching career (HC unless noted)
- ?: Maryville HS (MO)
- ?: Lawson HS (MO)
- 1975–1979: Missouri Western (assistant)
- 1980–1981: Michigan State (QB/RC)
- 1982: Michigan State (OC)
- 1983–1985: Missouri (RB)
- 1986–?: Louisville (RC)
- 1995: Baker
- 1997–1998: Southeast Missouri State (OC)

Head coaching record
- Overall: 3–6

Steve Schottel (born 1948) is an American former football coach. He was the head football coach at Baker University in Baldwin City, Kansas for the 1995 season. His coaching record at Baker was 3–6.

Schottel resigned the post after less than a year. Before taking the position at Baker, he was an assistant coach for the Benedictine Ravens, Missouri Tigers, Louisville, Michigan State, Colorado, William Jewell, and Missouri Western as well as several stops in the high school ranks.

He is the son of former Detroit Lions football player Ivan Schottel. His father was a head coach of Northwest Missouri State Bearcats football in Maryville, Missouri and Steve graduated Maryville High School in 1966 and was an assistant coach at the school in 1970.

== Head coaching record ==
Year	Team	Overall	Conference	Standing	Bowl/playoffs
Baker Wildcats (Heart of America Athletic Conference) (1995)
1995	Baker	3–6	2–6	T–7th	
Baker:		3–6	2–6		
Total:		3–6			
