= Charlie Richard =

American football player and coach (1941–1994)

Biographical details
- Born: May 30, 1941; Kansas City, Missouri, U.S.
- Died: December 13, 1994 (aged 53); Baldwin City, Kansas, U.S.

Playing career
- 1962: William Jewell
- Position: Quarterback

Coaching career (HC unless noted)
- 1972: Moberly HS (MO)
- 1974: Central Missouri State (assistant)
- 1975–1976: Highland (KS)
- 1977: Illinois State (off. backs)
- 1978–1979: Coffeyville (DC)
- 1980–1990: Baker
- 1992–1994: Baker

Head coaching record
- Overall: 123–28–1 (college); 10–10 (junior college)
- Tournaments: 11–10 (NAIA D-II playoffs)

Accomplishments and honors

Championships
- 10 HAAC (1980, 1983–1988, 1990, 1992–1993)
- College Football Hall of Fame; Inducted in 2004 (profile)

Charles Allen Richard (May 30, 1941 – December 13, 1994) was an American football player and coach. He served as the head football coach at Baker University from 1980 to 1990 and again from 1992 to 1994, compiling a record of 123–28–1. Richard was inducted into the College Football Hall of Fame as a coach in 2004 and the Kansas Sports Hall of Fame in 2006.

While at Baker, he coached future Green Bay Packers head coach Mike McCarthy.

== Head coaching record ==
=== College ===
Year	Team	Overall	Conference	Standing	Bowl/playoffs
Baker Wildcats (Heart of America Athletic Conference) (1980–1990)
1980	Baker	9–1–1	7–0–1	T–1st	L NAIA Division II Quarterfinal
1981	Baker	8–2	6–2	3rd	
1982	Baker	7–3	5–2	T–2nd	
1983	Baker	10–1	7–0	1st	L NAIA Division II Quarterfinal
1984	Baker	8–2	6–1	1st	L NAIA Division II Quarterfinal
1985	Baker	8–2	6–1	T–1st	
1986	Baker	9–2	6–0	1st	L NAIA Division II Championship
1987	Baker	9–2	6–0	1st	L NAIA Division II Semifinal
1988	Baker	9–1	7–0	1st	L NAIA Division II First Round
1989	Baker	10–2	6–1	2nd	L NAIA Division II Semifinal
1990	Baker	10–2	6–1	T–1st	L NAIA Division II Semifinal
Baker Wildcats (Heart of America Athletic Conference) (1992–1994)
1992	Baker	10–2	7–1	T–1st	L NAIA Division II Quarterfinal
1993	Baker	10–3	7–1	T–1st	L NAIA Division II Semifinal
1994	Baker	6–3	6–2	T–2nd	
Baker:		123–28–1	88–12–1		
Total:		123–28–1			
National championship Conference title Conference division title or championship game berth
