= David Klindt =

American politician

David Klindt (born June 9, 1950 in Bethany, Missouri) is a former Republican politician from the state of Missouri.

He graduated from South Harrison High School in 1968. He is an active farmer and current Vice President of the Association of Missouri Electric Cooperatives.

He was first elected to the Missouri House of Representatives in a special election in 1997, winning reelection in 1998 and 2000. He was elected to the Missouri State Senate, first in a special election in 2001, and again in 2002.

He was elected the Republican Majority Whip and served as chair of the Commerce, Energy, and the Environment Committee. He also served on the Administration Committee, and the Agriculture, Conservation, Parks, and Natural Resources Committee.

David Klindt has two sons, Ryan and Randy (each from Bethany, MO), and one daughter, Ronda Riekhof (from St. Joseph, MO). He has eight grandchildren: Ashton Klindt, Landan Klindt, Caleb Riekhof, Gabe Riekhof, Hannah Riekhof, Nolan Klindt, Jared Klindt, and Ainsley Klindt.
