= List of Missouri state high school boys basketball championships =

The Missouri state high school boys basketball championship is an annual tournament for boys' high school basketball teams in the U.S. state of Missouri. From 1917 through 1926, the tournament was held by the University of Missouri in Columbia, Missouri. Since then, the tournament has been held by the Missouri State High School Activities Association.

== University of Missouri ==
Year	Champion
1917	Central (Kansas City)
1918	Central (Kansas City)
1919	Excelsior Springs
1920	Northeast (Kansas City)
1921	Northeast (Kansas City)
1922	Central (Kansas City) (later forfeited)
1923	Westport (Kansas City)
1924	Warrensburg
1925	Westport (Kansas City)
1926	Westport (Kansas City)

== Missouri State High School Activities Association ==
Year	Class	Champion	Record	Head coach	Score	Runner-up	Third place	Score	Fourth place	Venue
1927	—	Northeast (Kansas City)		Reaves Peters	27-17	Central (Springfield)	Central (St. Joseph)	25-10	Jackson	Rothwell & Girls Gym, UMC, Columbia
1928	—	Oregon	34-2	Ivan Nigh	25-16	Central (Springfield)	Soldan	24-22	Warren County	Rothwell & Girls Gym, UMC, Columbia
1929	—	East (Kansas City)		J.C. Cohlmeyer	30-18	Southwest (Kansas City)	William Chrisman	48-9	Pleasant Hope	Rothwell Gym, UMC, Columbia
1930	—	Central (Kansas City)		Frank Guemple	13-11	East (Kansas City)	Soldan	43-12	Windsor	Rothwell & Brewer FH, UMC, Columbia
1931	—	Benton (St. Joseph)	21-2	Paul B. Springer	21-18	New Point	Kirksville	20-18	Westport (Kansas City)	Rothwell & Brewer FH, UMC, Columbia
1932	A	Rockhurst		Ed Halpin	17-15	Joplin	Christian Brothers (St. Joe) 20-6		Jefferson City	Rothwell & Brewer FH, UMC, Columbia
1932	B	Fruitland	28-2	R.B. Lewis	21-14	University High (Cape Gir.)	Forsyth	27-17	Competition	Rothwell & Brewer FH, UMC, Columbia
1933	A	Beaumont		R.G. Polster	29-23	St. Louis Univ. High	Roosevelt	21-17	East (Kansas City)	Brewer Fieldhouse, UMC, Columbia
1933	B	Christian Brothers	21-2	William Klemm	23-15	Jackson	St. James	11-10	Desloge	Brewer Fieldhouse, UMC, Columbia
1934	—	Jackson	20-2	Ryland Milner	17-11	Southwest (Kansas City)	Doniphan	29-22*	Beaumont	Brewer Fieldhouse, UMC, Columbia
1935	—	Northeast (Kansas City)		R.E. Peters	23-21	Hickman	Warrensburg	36-24	Fruitland	Brewer Fieldhouse, UMC, Columbia
1936	—	Hickman	24-0	Glenn Smith	28-24	Joplin	Maryville	23-21	William Chrisman	Brewer Fieldhouse, UMC, Columbia
1937	—	Maryville	32-0	W.H. Smith	51-27	Central (Springfield)	Bonne Terre	31-30	Joplin	Brewer Fieldhouse, UMC, Columbia
1938	—	Houston		Duke Hiett	34-26	University High (Cape Gir.)	Maryville	26-25	West County (Leadwood)	Brewer Fieldhouse, UMC, Columbia
1939	A	Joplin		Claude Mikkelson	39-31	St. Louis Univ. High	Houston	27-20	Trenton	Central High, St. Joseph
1939	B	Camdenton		W.L. Breuer	30-17	Richland (Essex)	Calhoun	39-28	Glasgow	Central High, Springfield
1940	A	McBride (St. Louis)		Carl Kamp	30-28	Central (Springfield)	Carthage	31-28	Central (St. Joseph)	Memorial Hall, Joplin
1940	B	Zalma	27-2	James Thornton	25-21	Bland	Glasgow	50-25	Archie	Houck Fieldhouse, SEMO, Cape Gir.
1941	A	Benton (St. Joseph)		Paul B. Springer	50-27	Soldan	Monett	38-31	Maplewood-Richmond Hts.	WashU, Fieldhouse, St. Louis
1941	B	Camdenton		W.L. Breuer	43-34	Rogersville	Advance	40-38	Fair Play	McDonald Arena, MSU, Springfield
1942	A	Beaumont	21-2	Tom Stanton	27-23	St. Louis Univ. High	Central (Cape Girardeau)	49-33	Monett	WashU, Fieldhouse, St. Louis
1942	B	Greenwood	26-4	J.H. Collins	45-41	Hopkins	St. Clair	43-34	Camdenton	McDonald Arena, MSU, Springfield
1943	—	Beaumont	26-2	Tom Stanton	30-27	Conway	Diehlstadt	42-31	Central (St. Joseph)	Central High, Springfield
1944	—	Bismarck	35-3	Ervin Leimer	40-38	Lebanon	Ozark	45-29	Jefferson City	Central High, Springfield
1945	—	Conway (42-3)		Robert C. Taylor	42-25	Central (Springfield)	Gilman City	38-26	Mexico	Central High, Springfield
1946	—	St. Louis University High	27-3	George Hasser	42-20	Bismarck	Waynesville	45-37	Univ. High (Cape Gir.)	WashU, Fieldhouse, St. Louis
1947	—	Beaumont	29-1	Tom Stanton	59-42	Versailles	Normandy	65-52	Hermann	McDonald Arena, MSU, Springfield
1948	—	Beaumont	28-2	Tom Stanton	44-35	St. James	Cleveland (St. Louis)	57-56	Lebanon	McDonald Arena, MSU, Springfield
1949	—	Buffalo	36-2	Eddie Matthews	57-44	Rockhurst	39-38	Bonne Terre	John Burroughs	McDonald Arena, MSU, Springfield
1950	A	Joplin	21-3	Russ Kaminsky	46-44**	Kirkwood	Clinton	52-50	St. Louis Univ. High	Brewer Fieldhouse, UMC, Columbia
1950	B	Ozark	30-2	Denny Burrows	33-20	School of the Osage	Puxico	51-44	Windsor	McDonald Arena, MSU, Springfield
1951	A	Normandy	30-1	Marshall Riegert	46-42	Maplewood-Richmond Hts.	Crystal City	61-58	Joplin	Brewer Fieldhouse, UMC, Columbia
1951	B	Puxico (40-0)		Arnold Ryan	42-38	Waynesville	John Burroughs	56-50	Morehouse	Houck Fieldhouse, SEMO, Cape Gir.
1952	A	St. Louis Univ. High	26-5	Henry Raymonds	50-40	DeAndreis (St. Louis)	Lillis (Kansas City)	57-51	University City	Brewer Fieldhouse, UMC, Columbia
1952	B	Puxico	39-2	Arnold Ryan	85-37	Shelbyville	Wheaton	58-49	Branson	Houck Fieldhouse, SEMO, Cape Gir.
1953	A	Cleveland (St. Louis)	25-4	Earl Jansen	62-46	St. Louis Univ. High	Webster Groves	99-63	Marshall	Brewer Fieldhouse, UMC, Columbia
1953	B	John Burroughs	27-1	Ray Wolfe	73-65	Puxico	Waynesville	83-66	Morehouse	Houck Fieldhouse, SEMO, Cape Gir.
1954	A	Central (Cape Girard.)	25-1	Louis Muegge	79-55	Christian Brothers	Westport (Kansas City)	55-51	Webster Groves	Houck Fieldhouse, SEMO, Cape Gir.
1954	B	Sparta	39-2	Herb Weston	58-56**	Morehouse	Troy Buchanan	54-47	Alton	Brewer Fieldhouse, UMC, Columbia
1955	A	Joplin	24-6	Russ Kaminsky	47-44	Northeast (Kansas City)	Rolla	65-49	Maplewood-Richmond Hts.	WashUniversity, St. Louis
1955	B	Branson (41-0)		John E. Chase	77-58	Univ. High (Warrensburg)	Buffalo	77-64	Lewistown	Houck Fieldhouse, SEMO, Cape Gir.
1956	L	Beaumont	29-2	Tom Stanton	67-56	Maplewood-Richmond Hts.	Cleveland (St. Louis)	64-57	Christian Brothers (St. Joe)	WashUniversity, St. Louis
1956	M	Pembroke Country Day	31-0	Edwin Ryan	79-69	Horace Mann (Maryville)	School of the Osage	72-70**	Forsyth	Brewer Fieldhouse, UMC, Columbia
1956	S	New Haven	35-2	Ellsworth Hartzell	86-53	Mayview	Archie	60-58*	Clever	McDonald Arena, MSU, Springfield
1957	L	St. Charles	24-8	Gene Bartow	60-54	North Kansas City	St. Louis Univ. High	77-59	Parkview	WashU, Fieldhouse, St. Louis
1957	M	Pembroke Country Day	28-3	Edwin Ryan	50-49	Advance	Richland	65-42	Gainesville	Brewer Fieldhouse, UMC, Columbia
1957	S	New Haven	32-2	Gordon Sulltrop	94-47	Bogard	Rocky Comfort	85-68	Gilman City	School of the Osage, Lake Ozark
1958	L	St. Louis Univ. High	28-0	Emmett Hanick	56-43	Central (St. Joseph)	Christian Brothers	54-52	Maplewood-Richmond Hts.	WashU, Fieldhouse, St. Louis
1958	M	Branson	35-1	John E. Chase	49-32	Thayer	Redemptorist (KC)	50-36	Elvins	Brewer Fieldhouse, UMC, Columbia
1958	S	New Haven	33-1	Gordon Sulltrup	55-42	Halfway	Madison	60-51	Burlington Junction	Brewer Fieldhouse, UMC, Columbia
1959	L	Christian Brothers	27-4	D. C. Wilcutt	75-63	Joplin	St. Louis Univ. High	60-50	St. Charles	WashU, Fieldhouse, St. Louis
1959	M	St. Agnes (Springfield)	30-1	Robert Taylor	60-48	Maryville	Montgomery County	66-65	Clarkton	Brewer Fieldhouse, UMC, Columbia
1959	S	New Haven	30-4	Gordon Sulltrup	57-41	Nixa	LaPlata	76-75	Southwest (Mooresville)	Brewer Fieldhouse, UMC, Columbia
1960	L	Christian Brothers	22-5	D. C. Wilcutt	61-49	St. Louis Univ. High	West Plains	63-59	Crystal City	WashU, Fieldhouse, St. Louis
1960	M	Bolivar	30-4	Bob Brown	50-38	Troy Buchanan	Notre Dame (Cape Gir.)	76-71*	Redemptorist (KC)	Brewer Fieldhouse, UMC, Columbia
1960	S	Van Buren	33-3	Hoyle Massey	76-74**	Madison	Everton	59-44	Platte County	Brewer Fieldhouse, UMC, Columbia
1961	L	St. Louis Univ. High	24-5	Emmet Hanick	52-51	Crystal City	Washington	50-46	Mercy (St. Louis)	WashU, Fieldhouse, St. Louis
1961	M	Lillis (Kansas City)	29-0	Jerry Letourneau	47-41	Thayer	Advance	77-71	Paris	Brewer Fieldhouse, UMC, Columbia
1961	S	Kearney	25-3	Merrill Sindt	66-48	Everton	Doe Run	68-67	Gilman City	Brewer Fieldhouse, UMC, Columbia
1962	L	Hickman	26-1	James McLeod	57-47	Kirkwood	Hadley Tech (St. Louis)	91-76	Central (Springfield)	WashU, Fieldhouse, St. Louis
1962	M	Bowling Green	25-8	Gene Hall	33-32	Branson	Richland (Gray Ridge)	70-54	Blue Springs	Brewer Fieldhouse, UMC, Columbia
1962	S	Bradleyville	28-4	Ray Gibson	59-49	North Harrison	Santa Fe (Alma)	38-37	Univ. High (Columbia)	Brewer Fieldhouse, UMC, Columbia
1963	L	Christian Brothers	25-7	D. C. Wilcutt	47-38	Jefferson City	Central (Kansas City)	58-50	Central (Springfield)	Public High Fieldhouse, Kansas City
1963	M	Republic	34-1	Leland Brown	78-63	Bernie	Clopton	70-59*	Lafayette County	Brewer Fieldhouse, UMC, Columbia
1963	S	Exeter	35-0	Tom Hewgley	54-43	South Iron	Jameson	64-54	Oregon	Brewer Fieldhouse, UMC, Columbia
1964	L	Bishop DuBourg	28-5	Roger Laux	62-52	Parkview	Central (Kansas City)	90-69	Maplewood-Richmond Hts.	WashU, Fieldhouse, St. Louis
1964	M	Buffalo	34-1	Mike Kirksey	79-63	Richland (Essex)	Pacific	82-80	Tipton	McDonald Arena, MSU, Springfield
1964	S	Goodman	24-2	Charles Goade	76-67	South Iron	Glasgow	80-44	Jameson	McDonald Arena, MSU, Springfield
1965	L	Parkview	27-1	Bill Harding	67-50	Center (Kansas City)	Southwest (St. Louis)	51-38	Beaumont	Kiel Auditorium (original), St. Louis
1965	M	Buffalo	32-3	Larry Atwood	65-49	California	Bloomfield	74-44	Owensville	Brewer Fieldhouse, UMC, Columbia
1965	S	South Iron	30-3	Gene Cozine	69-47	Golden City	Archie	59-51	Lancaster	Brewer Fieldhouse, UMC, Columbia
1966	L	Central (Kansas City)		Jim Wilkinson	52-48	Parkview	Lindbergh	53-45	Augustinian Acad. (St.L)	Kiel Auditorium (original), St. Louis
1966	M	Owensville	30-7	Richard Hood	62-54	Willard	Boonville	52-51	Bloomfield	Brewer Fieldhouse, UMC, Columbia
1966	S	Wright City	27-7	Terry Cain	55-45	Greenwood	Drexel	46-45	St. Joseph (Farmington)	Brewer Fieldhouse, UMC, Columbia
1967	L	Joplin	25-1	Russ Kaminsky	58-53*	Central (Kansas City)	Beaumont	59-51	Lindbergh	Kiel Auditorium (original), St. Louis
1967	M	Warrensburg	27-0	Jerry Elliott	64-51	Buffalo	Notre Dame (Cape Girard.)	69-46	Paris	Lexington High, Lexington
1967	S	Bradleyville	34-1	Argil Ellison	60-47	Archie	New Haven	73-59	Linn County	Lexington High, Lexington
1968	L	O\'Fallon Tech	25-4	Jodie Bailey	55-54	Hickman	Kirkwood	59-43	DeLaSalle (Kansas City)	Kiel Auditorium (original), St. Louis
1968	M	Matthews	34-1	Jim Hart	70-61	Boonville	Hermann	45-36	Iberia	Brewer Fieldhouse, UMC, Columbia
1968	S	Bradleyville	33-0	Argil Ellison	76-73****	Howardville	Glasgow	69-49	Lathrop	Brewer Fieldhouse, UMC, Columbia
1969	L	Sumner	30-2	John Algee	71-57	Webster Groves	Hickman	61-41	William Chrisman	Kiel Auditorium (original), St. Louis
1969	M	Dixon	36-0	Robert Ogle	76-74	Oran	Hermann	55-43	Pembroke Country Day	Brewer Fieldhouse, UMC, Columbia
1969	S	St. George (Hermann)	31-3	Dennis Kruse	70-54	Skyline	Glasgow	69-67	Oak Grove	Brewer Fieldhouse, UMC, Columbia
1970	L	Raytown South	27-1	Bud Lathrop	68-65*	Rockhurst	Lindbergh	67-65	Beaumont	Kiel Auditorium (original), St. Louis
1970	M	Hermann	33-0	Don Gosen	42-36	Lutheran South	Buffalo	87-76	Christian Brothers (St. Joe)	Brewer Fieldhouse, UMC, Columbia
1970	S	New Haven	24-8	Glen Scheer	79-69	Jameson	Metz	74-70*	Skyline	Multipurpose Fieldhouse, UMR, Rolla
1971	L	Vashon (St. Louis)	24-2	Ronald Coleman	78-72	Paseo (Kansas City)	Rockhurst	80-50	DeSoto	Kiel Auditorium (original), St. Louis
1971	M	Manual (Kansas City)	24-2	Wm. Madison III	54-51	Fredericktown	Hermann	59-36	Mount Vernon	Brewer Fieldhouse, UMC, Columbia
1971	S	Stanberry	26-5	Bill Meyers	75-66	Wright City	Cairo	71-63	Marion C. Early	Multipurpose Fieldhouse, UMR, Rolla
1972	L	Raytown South	24-5	Bud Lathrop	52-48	Kirkwood	Sumner	82-72	Carthage	Brewer Fieldhouse, UMC, Columbia
1972	M	Montgomery City	29-4	Bill Ballew	68-48	St. Pius X (Kansas City)	Richland (Essex)	67-66	Willard	Brewer Fieldhouse, UMC, Columbia
1972	S	Advance	27-5	Carroll Cookson	69-61	Marion C. Early	Northeast Nodaway	69-59	North Harrison	Multipurpose Fieldhouse, UMR, Rolla
1973	L	DeSmet	28-5	Rich Grawer	51-47	Kirkwood	Smith-Cotton	68-62	Paseo (Kansas City)	Hearnes Center, UMC, Columbia
1973	M	Lutheran South	30-1	Herm Meyer	76-62	Manual (Kansas City)	Palmyra	58-54	Webb City	Hearnes Center, UMC, Columbia
1973	S	Forsyth	26-8	Charles Campbell	63-60	Advance	Westran	83-71	Mound City	Hearnes Center, UMC, Columbia
1974	1A	Glasgow	33-0	Richard Roysten	78-73	Greenfield	Smithton	71-63	Advance	Hearnes Center, UMC, Columbia
1974	2A	Lilbourn	30-2	Larry Warren	70-64	Nixa	Montgomery County	51-42	Lafayette County	Hearnes Center, UMC, Columbia
1974	3A	Owensville	30-1	Jerry Buescher	51-48	St. Pius X (Kansas City)	Bayless	69-66	Memorial (Joplin)	Hearnes Center, UMC, Columbia
1974	4A	McCluer	30-2	Larry Jacob	57-48	Central (St. Louis)	Central (Kansas City)	45-41	Raytown South	Hearnes Center, UMC, Columbia
1975	1A	Advance	29-3	Carroll Cookson	55-44	Northeast Nodaway	Glasgow	67-52	Mansfield	Hearnes Center, UMC, Columbia
1975	2A	Lilbourn	31-0	Bob Phelps	84-66	Logan-Rogersville	Bishop LeBlond	94-74	St. James	Hearnes Center, UMC, Columbia
1975	3A	Charleston	29-4	Mitch Haskins	57-56	Lafayette (St. Joseph)	Clayton	50-45	Rock Bridge	Hearnes Center, UMC, Columbia
1975	4A	McCluer	20-9	Mark Bernsen	71-66	Sumner	Raytown South	65-62	Raytown	Hearnes Center, UMC, Columbia
1976	1A	Scott County Central	32-1	Ron Cookson	82-71	Glasgow	Plato	63-52	Drexel	Hearnes Center, UMC, Columbia
1976	2A	St. James	24-6	Grant Crow	72-46	Clearwater	Linn	67-64	Licking	Hearnes Center, UMC, Columbia
1976	3A	Lafayette (St. Joseph)	28-3	Mel Clark	87-82	Memorial (Joplin)	Central (Park Hills)	56-53	Troy Buchanan	Hearnes Center, UMC, Columbia
1976	4A	Center (Kansas City)		Max Hayes	66-54	Central (St. Louis)	St. Charles	70-55	McCluer	Hearnes Center, UMC, Columbia
1977	1A	Lesterville	30-3	Billy Joe Martin	45-38	Northeast Nodaway	Ash Grove	76-45	Newtown-Harris	Hearnes Center, UMC, Columbia
1977	2A	Bishop LeBlond	27-5	John Bizal	64-56	Linn	Notre Dame (Cape Girard.)	70-68	Forsyth	Hearnes Center, UMC, Columbia
1977	3A	Memorial (Joplin)	31-1	Mike O\'Rourke	80-73	Charleston	Manual (Kansas City)	70-63	Troy Buchanan	Hearnes Center, UMC, Columbia
1977	4A	Raytown South	25-4	Bud Lathrop	67-53	Central (Kansas City)	DeSmet	66-64	Vashon (St. Louis)	Hearnes Center, UMC, Columbia
1978	1A	Glasgow	24-7	Larry Littrell	52-47	Marionville	Clopton	68-64	Concordia	Hearnes Center, UMC, Columbia
1978	2A	Nixa	30-1	Frank Branstetter	95-56	Lilbourn	Lillis (Kansas City)	67-59	Palmyra	Hearnes Center, UMC, Columbia
1978	3A	Memorial (Joplin)	31-0	Mike O\'Rourke	97-69	McKinley	Rock Bridge	67-62	Charleston	Hearnes Center, UMC, Columbia
1978	4A	DeSmet	31-1	Rich Grawer	61-57	Central (Kansas City)	Central (St. Louis)	62-41	Kirkwood	Hearnes Center, UMC, Columbia
1979	1A	Scott County Central	30-3	Ron Cookson	75-51	Sparta	Northeast Nodaway	66-40	Harrisburg	Hearnes Center, UMC, Columbia
1979	2A	Palmyra	29-0	Don Foster	65-61	Crystal City	Nixa	83-67	Butler	Hearnes Center, UMC, Columbia
1979	3A	Central (Kansas City)	30-1	Jack Bush	49-44	Charleston	Holt (Wentzville)	72-55	Aurora	Hearnes Center, UMC, Columbia
1979	4A	DeSmet	32-0	Rich Grawer	77-64	William Chrisman	Kirkwood	74-72	Vashon (St. Louis)	Hearnes Center, UMC, Columbia
1980	1A	Glasgow	29-1	Larry Littrell	56-41	Greenwood	Jameson	68-57	LaMonte	Hearnes Center, UMC, Columbia
1980	2A	Scott County Central	32-1	Ronnie Cookson	94-52	Slater	Willow Springs	67-52	Wellsville-Middletown	Hearnes Center, UMC, Columbia
1980	3A	Charleston	25-6	Lennies McFerren	50-44	Republic	Bishop Hogan (KC)	59-54	Lutheran North (St. Louis)	Hearnes Center, UMC, Columbia
1980	4A	Central (Cape Girardeau)	29-4	Dan Milligan	53-51	Hickman Mills	William Chrisman	83-82*	DeSmet	Hearnes Center, UMC, Columbia
1981	1A	Mound City	27-0	Larry Hughes	62-52	Wellsville-Middletown	Bell City	57-56	McAuley Catholic	Hearnes Center, UMC, Columbia
1981	2A	North Pemiscot	27-4	Jerry Luellen	51-49	Willow Springs	Penney	77-75*	Hallsville	Hearnes Center, UMC, Columbia
1981	3A	Chillicothe	23-6	Rich Fairchild	58-49	St. Francis Borgia	McDonald County	70-68	Sullivan	Hearnes Center, UMC, Columbia
1981	4A	Soldan	28-3	Marvin Neals	57-45	DeSmet	Parkview	46-44	Central (Kansas City)	Hearnes Center, UMC, Columbia
1982	1A	Marion C. Early	25-5	Bill Holmes	66-56	Greenwood	Glasgow	50-46	King City	Hearnes Center, UMC, Columbia
1982	2A	Marionville	25-5	Tony Armstrong	70-61	Monroe City	Crystal City	75-69	Lafayette County	Hearnes Center, UMC, Columbia
1982	3A	Logan-Rogersville	29-1	Gary McDaniels	61-57	Chillicothe	Vashon (St. Louis)	59-49	Charleston	Hearnes Center, UMC, Columbia
1982	4A	DeSmet	27-5	Dale Burgman	41-39	St. Louis Univ. High	Hickman	57-52	Central (Kansas City)	Hearnes Center, UMC, Columbia
1983	1A	Scott County Central	30-3	Ron Cookson	89-71	Clopton	Walnut Grove	42-40*	Northeast Nodaway	Hammons Stdt. Ctr., MSU, Springfield
1983	2A	Hayti	24-6	Kent Reynolds	78-72	Licking	Palmyra	70-57	Lafayette County	Hammons Stdt. Ctr., MSU, Springfield
1983	3A	Charleston	30-3	Lennies McFerron	71-65	Warrensburg	Logan-Rogersville	61-47	Centralia	Hearnes Center, UMC, Columbia
1983	4A	Vashon (St. Louis)	12-19	Floyd Irons	75-62	Van Horn	Oak Park	55-53	Beaumont	Hearnes Center, UMC, Columbia
1984	1A	Springfield Catholic	28-4	Jerry Buescher	40-37	Clopton	St. Paul Lutheran	59-58	Jefferson	Hearnes Center, UMC, Columbia
1984	2A	Eskridge	26-6	Al Galloway	67-50	Slater	Nixa	57-53*	Lathrop	Hearnes Center, UMC, Columbia
1984	3A	McKinley (St. Louis)	26-4	Jimmie Cook	60-56	Ozark	Central (Kansas City)	59-56	Jennings	Hearnes Center, UMC, Columbia
1984	4A	Hillcrest	25-7	Gary Stanfield	51-50	Vashon (St. Louis)	Beaumont	50-48	Lincoln Prep Acad.	Hearnes Center, UMC, Columbia
1985	1A	Scott County Central	27-1	Ron Cookson	73-58	Northeast Nodaway	Clopton	74-56	Lincoln	Hammons Stdt. Ctr., MSU, Springfield
1985	2A	Lathrop	27-0	Harold Brown	46-45	Eskridge	Mansfield	74-66	Paris	Hammons Stdt. Ctr., MSU, Springfield
1985	3A	Malden	30-3	Randy Scott	88-67	Lutheran North (St. Louis)	Benton (St. Joseph)	38-33	Waynesville	Hearnes Center, UMC, Columbia
1985	4A	Vashon (St. Louis)	27-5	Floyd Irons	52-49*	Soldan	Raytown South	78-69	Lincoln Prep Acad.	Hearnes Center, UMC, Columbia
1986	1A	Scott County Central	28-6	Ron Cookson	84-76***	Wellsville-Middletown	Northeast Nodaway	85-56	Lockwood	Hammons Stdt. Ctr., MSU, Springfield
1986	2A	Notre Dame (Cape Gir.)	26-6	Brad Wittenborn	66-47	Nixa	Monroe City	72-67	Pembroke Hill	Hammons Stdt. Ctr., MSU, Springfield
1986	3A	Charleston	28-5	Lennies McFerren	44-43	Logan-Rogersville	Paseo (Kansas City)	85-72	Troy Buchanan	Hearnes Center, UMC, Columbia
1986	4A	Vashon (St. Louis)	31-1	Floyd Irons	72-43	Rockhurst	Parkway West	60-49	Glendale	Hearnes Center, UMC, Columbia
1987	1A	Scott County Central	28-5	Ron Cookson	85-69	Wellsville-Middletown	King City	50-43	Smithton	Hammons Stdt. Ctr., MSU, Springfield
1987	2A	Notre Dame (Cape Gir.)	31-2	Brad Wittenborn	74-68	Hartville	Lathrop	69-67	Wright City	Hammons Stdt. Ctr., MSU, Springfield
1987	3A	Charleston	28-4	Lennies McFerren	37-36	Fulton	Marshfield	68-58	Bishop Hogan (KC)	Hearnes Center, UMC, Columbia
1987	4A	Rockhurst	27-2	Doug Bruce	63-58**	Kickapoo (Springfield)	Hazelwood Central	78-66	Beaumont	Hearnes Center, UMC, Columbia
1988	1A	Scott County Central	34-0	Ron Cookson	78-53	Walnut Grove	North Harrison	78-74	Harrisburg	Hammons Stdt. Ctr., MSU, Springfield
1988	2A	Eskridge	28-2	Al Galloway	66-50	Liberty (Mountain View)	Maplewood-Richmond Hts.	71-70	St. Pius X (Kansas City)	Hammons Stdt. Ctr., MSU, Springfield
1988	3A	Central (New Madrid County)	25-7	Gerald Murphy	71-59	Paseo (Kansas City)	Willard	70-65	Troy Buchanan	Hearnes Center, UMC, Columbia
1988	4A	Vashon (St. Louis)	30-1	Floyd Irons	63-49	Lee\'s Summit	Holt (Wentzville)	54-53	Jefferson City	Hearnes Center, UMC, Columbia
1989	1A	Scott County Central	31-2	Ron Cookson	63-53	Clopton	Greenfield	53-47	Fairfax	Hammons Stdt. Ctr., MSU, Springfield
1989	2A	Licking	29-3	Grant Crow	80-65	Bernie	Clark County	67-57	St.Pius X (Kansas City)	Hammons Stdt. Ctr., MSU, Springfield
1989	3A	Charleston	24-6	Lennies McFerren	54-49	Marshfield	Berkeley	60-49	Warrensburg	Hammons Stdt. Ctr., MSU, Springfield
1989	4A	Rockhurst	23-7	Doug Bruce	57-56	Vashon (St. Louis)	Jefferson City	63-47	DeSmet	Hammons Stdt. Ctr., MSU, Springfield
1990	1A	Scott County Central	32-1	Ron Cookson	71-45	New Franklin	Malta Bend	84-63	Pattonsburg	Hammons Stdt. Ctr., MSU, Springfield
1990	2A	Cardinal Ritter (St. Louis)	28-2	Preston Thomas	58-55	Alton	South Shelby	77-70*	St. Pius X (Kansas City)	Hammons Stdt. Ctr., MSU, Springfield
1990	3A	Charleston	33-0	Lennies McFerren	67-47	Soldan	Benton (St. Joseph)	63-59	Willow Springs	Hammons Stdt. Ctr., MSU, Springfield
1990	4A	Raytown South	31-0	Bud Lathrop	66-47	DeSmet	Vashon (St. Louis)	50-47	Glendale	Hammons Stdt. Ctr., MSU, Springfield
1991	1A	Scott County Central	33-0	Ron Cookson	56-48	Greenwood	New Bloomfield	80-77	Wellington-Napoleon	Hammons Stdt. Ctr., MSU, Springfield
1991	2A	Portageville	31-0	Jim Bidewell	73-51	Bishop Hogan (KC)	Forsyth	76-72	Palmyra	Hammons Stdt. Ctr., MSU, Springfield
1991	3A	Festus	31-1	Rod Gorman	77-63	Nevada	Osage	69-68*	Mexico	Hammons Stdt. Ctr., MSU, Springfield
1991	4A	Parkway West	31-2	Bill Sodemann	53-49*	Hickman Mills	Rock Bridge	55-51	Parkway Central	Hammons Stdt. Ctr., MSU, Springfield
1992	1A	Van Buren	28-5	Randal Jenkins	68-60	New Bloomfield	Halfway	50-43	North Harrison	Hearnes Center, UMC, Columbia
1992	2A	Portageville	25-5	Jim Bidewell	85-82*	Eugene	Highland	73-67	Hartville	Hearnes Center, UMC, Columbia
1992	3A	Charleston	31-2	Lennies McFerren	43-19	Eldon	Benton (St. Joseph)	69-63	Troy Buchanan	Hearnes Center, UMC, Columbia
1992	4A	Riverview Gardens	31-1	Todd Dutton	68-62	Raytown South	Kickapoo (Springfield)	63-48	Parkway Central	Hearnes Center, UMC, Columbia
1993	1A	Scott County Central	27-6	Ron Cookson	72-51	Green City	Lockwood	73-52	Tarkio	Hearnes Center, UMC, Columbia
1993	2A	Portageville	31-0	Jim Bidewell	63-41	Brookfield	Skyline	47-40	Forsyth	Hearnes Center, UMC, Columbia
1993	3A	St. Francis Borgia	28-3	Dave Neier	74-72	Jennings	Helias	73-71	Marshall	Hearnes Center, UMC, Columbia
1993	4A	Jefferson City	22-8	James Byland	60-56	Poplar Bluff	DeSoto	58-54	Raytown South	Hearnes Center, UMC, Columbia
1994	1A	Lockwood	30-1	Dennis Cornish	64-60	Scott County Central	New Franklin	65-53	Rock Port	Hearnes Center, UMC, Columbia
1994	2A	Portageville	25-3	Jim Bidewell	76-66	Fatima	Alton	65-38	Cole Camp	Hearnes Center, UMC, Columbia
1994	3A	St. Francis Borgia	31-1	Dave Neier	88-67	Mexico	Helias	49-46	Maryville	Hearnes Center, UMC, Columbia
1994	4A	Vashon (St. Louis)	27-2	Floyd Irons	58-54	Hazelwood Central	St. Charles West	66-61	Central (Kansas City)	Hearnes Center, UMC, Columbia
1995	1A	Barstow	22-10	Fritz Gabler	74-64	Lockwood	South Iron	67-56	New Bloomfield	Hearnes Center, UMC, Columbia
1995	2A	Cardinal Ritter (St. Louis)	30-3	Preston Thomas	62-60	Skyline	Diamond	81-64	Monroe City	Hearnes Center, UMC, Columbia
1995	3A	Mexico	28-3	Keith Miller	87-73	Maryville	St. Francis Borgia	79-51	Mount Vernon	Hearnes Center, UMC, Columbia
1995	4A	St. Charles West	30-2	Terry Holander	58-51	Vashon (St. Louis)	Central (Kansas City)	68-66	Sikeston	Hearnes Center, UMC, Columbia
1996	1A	Richland (Essex)	31-2	Doyle Pitts	72-54	Lockwood	Jefferson	59-56	Sturgeon	Hearnes Center, UMC, Columbia
1996	2A	Cardinal Ritter (St. Louis)	25-6	Preston Thomas	69-47	Hollister	Pembroke Hill	77-59	Fatima	Hearnes Center, UMC, Columbia
1996	3A	Charleston	31-1	Bobby Spencer	61-54	Mexico	Fulton	72-62	Chillicothe	Hearnes Center, UMC, Columbia
1996	4A	Webster Groves	29-3	Tim Moore	53-46	West Plains	DeSmet	72-56	Truman	Hearnes Center, UMC, Columbia
1997	1A	New Haven	26-6	Ray Steinhoff	74-71*	Bishop Hogan (KC)	Chadwick	70-56	Golden City	Hearnes Center, UMC, Columbia
1997	2A	East Carter	30-2	Mike Harlow	0	Pembroke Hill (forfeit)	Hartville	75-49	Linn	Hearnes Center, UMC, Columbia
1997	3A	Webb City	26-4	Eric Johnson	46-41	Chillicothe	Jennings	77-63	Sullivan	Hearnes Center, UMC, Columbia
1997	4A	Christian Brothers	28-4	Bob McCormick	51-35	Truman	Rock Bridge	51-48	Vashon (St. Louis)	Hearnes Center, UMC, Columbia
1998	1A	Fordland	23-7	Andy Underwood	75-43	Bishop Hogan (KC)	New Haven	57-52	Weaubleau	Hearnes Center, UMC, Columbia
1998	2A	Palmyra	26-5	Brad Thompson	0	Pembroke Hill (forfeit)	Hartville	82-71	Portageville	Hearnes Center, UMC, Columbia
1998	3A	St. Francis Borgia	31-1	Dave Neier	55-50	Chillicothe	Webb City	79-54	Mexico	Hearnes Center, UMC, Columbia
1998	4A	Liberty	31-0	Mark Nusbaum	42-41	Lafayette (Wildwood)	Vashon (St. Louis)	63-50	Jefferson City	Hearnes Center, UMC, Columbia
1999	1A	New Haven	29-3	Ray Steinhoff	48-46	Fordland	Santa Fe	58-41	King City	Hearnes Center, UMC, Columbia
1999	2A	Hollister	28-3	Duane Hiler	0	Pembroke Hill (forfeit)	Portageville	75-63	North Callaway	Hearnes Center, UMC, Columbia
1999	3A	Nixa	29-4	Jay Osborne	71-47	St. Francis Borgia	Warrensburg	67-64	Jennings	Hearnes Center, UMC, Columbia
1999	4A	DeSmet	30-2	Bob Steiner	70-64	Vashon (St. Louis)	Central (Kansas City)	88-79	Troy Buchanan	Hearnes Center, UMC, Columbia
2000	1A	Jefferson	29-3	Don Edwards	70-55	Billings	Weaubleau	61-55	Brunswick	Hearnes Center, UMC, Columbia
2000	2A	Whitfield	30-3	Rich Fanning	74-59	Blair Oaks	Forsyth	59-44	Linn	Hearnes Center, UMC, Columbia
2000	3A	Central (New Madrid County)	23-6	Lennies McFerren	68-55	Park Hill South	Reeds Spring	70-57	Jennings	Hearnes Center, UMC, Columbia
2000	4A	Vashon (St. Louis)	27-2	Floyd Irons	56-50	DeSmet	Rockhurst	64-44	Francis Howell North	Hearnes Center, UMC, Columbia
2001	1A	New Haven	29-2	Ray Steinhoff	45-26	Liberal	Stoutland	62-51	Jefferson	Hearnes Center, UMC, Columbia
2001	2A	Blair Oaks	23-7	Gary Verslues	67-51	Butler	Cardinal Ritter (St. Louis)	64-41	Diamond	Hearnes Center, UMC, Columbia
2001	3A	Central (New Madrid County)	23-7	Lennies McFerren	49-47	Hickman Mills	Ozark	64-52	Helias	Hearnes Center, UMC, Columbia
2001	4A	Vashon (St. Louis)	28-1	Floyd Irons	63-52	Liberty	Eureka	52-46	Hannibal	Hearnes Center, UMC, Columbia
2002	1A	Bell City	29-5	David Heeb	88-68	Santa Fe	Community	63-62	Stewartsville	Hearnes Center, UMC, Columbia
2002	2A	Lutheran North (St. Louis)	25-7	Brent Rueter	72-62	Elsberry	Marionville	52-50	Bishop LeBlond	Hearnes Center, UMC, Columbia
2002	3A	MICDS	29-3	Don Maurer	53-51	Central (New Madrid County)	Nixa	80-74	Westport	Hearnes Center, UMC, Columbia
2002	4A	Vashon (St. Louis)	30-1	Floyd Irons	82-27	DeSmet	Liberty	67-46	Jefferson City	Hearnes Center, UMC, Columbia
2003	1	Verona	32-0	Brad Stewart	65-47	North Shelby	Dadeville	68-57	Braymer	Hearnes Center, UMC, Columbia
2003	2	East Carter	23-7	Larry Morgan	77-51	West Platte	Thayer	51-39	Harrisburg	Hearnes Center, UMC, Columbia
2003	3	Cardinal Ritter (St. Louis)	31-0	Marvin Neals	64-53	Ash Grove	Charleston	57-54	Lincoln Prep Academy	Hearnes Center, UMC, Columbia
2003	4	Ozark	28-4	Steve Hunter	71-68	Paseo Academy	St. Charles West	81-69	DeSoto	Hearnes Center, UMC, Columbia
2003	5	Kickapoo (Springfield)	30-1	Roy Green	65-42	Raytown South	Parkway Central	69-65	Poplar Bluff	Hearnes Center, UMC, Columbia
2004	1	Bell City	29-4	David Heeb	74-62	St. Elizabeth	North Andrew	54-48	Bevier	Hearnes Center, UMC, Columbia
2004	2	Van-Far	28-3	Brian Meny	46-40	Marionville	Lone Jack	58-45	Senath-Hornersville	Hearnes Center, UMC, Columbia
2004	3	Centralia	29-2	David Meyers	41-32	Maryville	Charleston	85-82	Mountain Grove	Hearnes Center, UMC, Columbia
2004	4	Vashon (St. Louis)	31-0	Floyd Irons	68-55	Kearney	Ozark	78-56	Dexter	Hearnes Center, UMC, Columbia
2004	5	Poplar Bluff	25-6	John David Pattillo	64-56	Blue Springs	Lafayette (Wildwood)	60-52	Jefferson City	Hearnes Center, UMC, Columbia
2005	1	North Shelby	31-1	Steve Carvajal	59-51	Jefferson	St. Elizabeth	92-91*	Bell City	Mizzou Arena, UMC, Columbia
2005	2	Marionville	27-3	Ted Young	35-30	St. Vincent	Salisbury	59-44	East Buchanan	Mizzou Arena, UMC, Columbia
2005	3	Lutheran North (St. Louis)	22-10	Brent Rueter	72-63	Charleston	Versailles	52-48*	Hogan Prep Academy	Mizzou Arena, UMC, Columbia
2005	4	O’Hara	27-5	Todd Magwire	81-77*	Willard	Westminster Christian Ac.	67-61	Notre Dame (Cape Gir.)	Mizzou Arena, UMC, Columbia
2005	5	Poplar Bluff	27-4	John David Pattillo	72-56	Vashon (St. Louis)	Kickapoo (Springfield)	67-58	Rockhurst	Mizzou Arena, UMC, Columbia
2006	1	Jefferson	32-0	Tim Jermain	74-61	Bell City	Silex	61-60	Tuscumbia	Mizzou Arena, UMC, Columbia
2006	2	Harrisburg	28-4	Steve Combs	41-38	Marionville	Advance	70-60	West Platte	Mizzou Arena, UMC, Columbia
2006	3	Cardinal Ritter (St. Louis)	28-3	Marvin Neals	67-55	Charleston	Cameron	51-35	Mount Vernon	Mizzou Arena, UMC, Columbia
2006	4	St. Francis Borgia	30-1	Dave Neier	77-62	Sikeston	Lincoln Prep Academy	57-49	Ozark	Mizzou Arena, UMC, Columbia
2006	5	Vashon (St. Louis)	27-2	Floyd Irons	58-55	Kickapoo (Springfield)	Kirkwood	58-54*	Rockhurst	Mizzou Arena, UMC, Columbia
2007	1	Jefferson	31-1	Tim Jermain	66-65	Bell City	LaPlata	73-71	Wheatland	Mizzou Arena, UMC, Columbia
2007	2	Eskridge (17-10)		Sterling Bates	64-54	Mansfield	Harrisburg	82-64	Osceola	Mizzou Arena, UMC, Columbia
2007	3	Charleston	29-3	Danny Farmer	66-48	Pembroke Hill	Spokane	64-57	Bowling Green	Mizzou Arena, UMC, Columbia
2007	4	Ruskin	29-1	Gerry Marlin	59-56	Notre Dame (Cape Gir.)	Willard	60-49	St. Charles	Mizzou Arena, UMC, Columbia
2007	5	McCluer North	26-3	Randy Reed	69-57	Rockhurst	Fort Zumwalt South	65-58	Lindbergh	Mizzou Arena, UMC, Columbia
2008	1	Jefferson	29-2	Tim Jermain	59-30	Glasgow	Scott County Central	83-58	Fair Play	Mizzou Arena, UMC, Columbia
2008	2	Harrisburg	28-3		51-44	South Iron	Clever	67-33	West Platte	Mizzou Arena, UMC, Columbia
2008	3	Maplewood-Richmond Hts	28-4		56-55	Lutheran North (St. Louis)	Hogan Prep	86-60	Linn	Mizzou Arena, UMC, Columbia
2008	4	Notre Dame (Cape Gir.)	24-6		48-36	St. Charles West	Webb City	72-50	Lincoln Prep	Mizzou Arena, UMC, Columbia
2008	5	Webster Groves	29-3	Jay Blossom	71-62	McCluer North	Fort Zumwalt South	61-58	Truman	Mizzou Arena, UMC, Columbia
2009	1	Scott County Central	29-2	Ronnie Cookson	98-63	Newtown-Harris	Glasgow	72-62	Chadwick	Mizzou Arena, UMC, Columbia
2009	2	Portageville	24-5	Jim Bidewell	60-55	Harrisburg	Miller	48-46	Laquey	Mizzou Arena, UMC, Columbia
2009	3	Maplewood-Richmond Hts	30-3	Corey Frazier	73-55	Whitfield	Lee's Summit Comm. Christian	51-62	Blue Eye	Mizzou Arena, UMC, Columbia
2009	4	St. Francis Borgia	28-3	Dave Neier	59-41	Kearney	Helias	57-42	Miller Career Academy	Mizzou Arena, UMC, Columbia
2009	5	Chaminade	27-4	Kelvin Lee	80-70	Grandview	Rock Bridge	54-40	Oakville	Mizzou Arena, UMC, Columbia
2010	1	Scott County Central	25-2	Kenyon Wright	96-47	Pilot Grove	Dadeville	62-31	Braymer	Mizzou Arena, UMC, Columbia
2010	2	Sturgeon	32-0	Greg Buescher	82-80	Bernie	Eskride	77-61	Clever	Mizzou Arena, UMC, Columbia
2010	3	Cardinal Ritter (St. Louis)	25-4	Marvin Neals	93-69	Hogan Prep Charter	Whitefield	64-59	Mt. Vernon	Mizzou Arena, UMC, Columbia
2010	4	Kearney	28-3	Gary Belcher	47-43	St. Francis Borgia	Soldan	62-55	Republic	Mizzou Arena, UMC, Columbia
2010	5	Hillcrest	20-7	John Schafer	54-49	Oakville	Christian Brothers	51-43	Park Hill South	Mizzou Arena, UMC, Columbia
2011	1	Scott County Central	29-2	Kenyon Wright	69-54	Dadeville	Jefferson	68-60	La Plata	Mizzou Arena, UMC, Columbia
2011	2	Crane	29-4	Rob Guerint	63-77	Bernie	Wellington-Napoleon	90-67	New Bloomfield	Mizzou Arena, UMC, Columbia
2011	3	Hogan	23-8	Steve Stitzer	61-46	Stafford	Charleston	87-79	Elsberry	Mizzou Arena, UMC, Columbia
2011	4	Sikeston	30-0	Gregg Holifield	74-55	St. Francis Borgia	Soldan	69-54	Lafayette (St. Joseph)	Mizzou Arena, UMC, Columbia
2011	5	McCluer North	29-4	Randy Reed	63-53	Troy Buchanan	Lee's Summit North	55-43	Rock Bridge	Mizzou Arena, UMC, Columbia
2012	1	Scott County Central	22-10	Kenyon Wright	79-72	Drexel	Glasgow	56-45	St. Joseph Christian	Mizzou Arena, UMC, Columbia
2012	2	Billings	29-3	Kendall Tilley	83-79	Salisbury	Hayti	79-54	Osceola	Mizzou Arena, UMC, Columbia
2012	3	Charleston	31-2	Danny Farmer	79-73	Hogan	Lutheran North (St. Louis)	61-43	Mount Vernon	Mizzou Arena, UMC, Columbia
2012	4	Soldan	25-5	Justin Tatum	55-42	Hillcrest	Liberty North	54-50 (1 OT)	Imagine	Mizzou Arena, UMC, Columbia
2012	5	McCluer North	28-1	Randy Reed	69-60	Nixa	Lee's Summit West	53-41	Marquette	Mizzou Arena, UMC, Columbia
2013	1	Eminence	27-5	Pete McBride	62-60	Stanberry	Drexel	75-50	Meadville	Mizzou Arena, UMC, Columbia
2013	2	Salisbury	30-1	Kenny Wyatt	70-46	West Platte	Iberia	65-63	Oran	Mizzou Arena, UMC, Columbia
2013	3	College Preparatory at Madison	31-2	Altonio Irons	67-52	St. Pius X	Lutheran North (St. Louis)	74-47	Fatima	Mizzou Arena, UMC, Columbia
2013	4	Republic	28-4	Treyvon Fisher	54-51	Normandy	Sikeston	55-54	Liberty North	Mizzou Arena, UMC, Columbia
2013	5	Rockhurst	26-5	Mark Nusbaum	73-59	DeSmet	Hickman	65-53	Vianney	Mizzou Arena, UMC, Columbia
2014	1	Scott County Central	26-5	Frank Staple	69-39	Meadville	Stanberry	55-54	Mack's Creek	Mizzou Arena, UCM, Columbia
2014	2	Sacred Heart (Sedalia)	31-0	Steve Goodwin	61-45	Iberia	Canton	61-54	Thayer	Mizzou Arena, UCM, Columbia
2014	3	Cardinal Ritter (St. Louis)	26-5	Marvin Neals	57-48	Barstow	Strafford	70-63	College Prep Madison	Mizzou Arena, UCM, Columbia
2014	4	Republic	27-4	Treyvon Fisher	45-42	Lafayette (St. Joseph)	Helias	60-53	Farmington	Mizzou Arena, UCM, Columbia
2014	5	Christian Brothers	25-7	Justin Tatum	86-77	Hickman (Columbia)	Lee's Summit West	70-58	Hazelwood Central	Mizzou Arena, UCM, Columbia
2015	1	Meadville	32-0	Drew Nier	50-46	Winston	Advance	69-53	Leeton	Mizzou Arena, UCM, Columbia
2015	2	Scott County Central	27-4	Frank Staple	53-48	Mid-Buchanan	Crane	63-40	Canton	Mizzou Arena, UCM, Columbia
2015	3	Barstow	29-2	Billy Thomas	61-46	Strafford	Central (New Madrid County)	58-50	The College Preparatory	Mizzou Arena, UCM, Columbia
2015	4	St. Charles	28-4	Rick Foster	74-69	Hillcrest	Notre Dame (Cape Girardeau)	65-44	Bolivar	Mizzou Arena, UCM, Columbia
2015	5	Blue Springs South	29-2	Jimmy Cain	71-57	Park Hill South	Chaminade	71-35	St. Louis University	Mizzou Arena, UCM, Columbia
2016	1	Eminence	27-5	Pete McBride	62-60	Stanberry	Drexel	75-50	Meadville	Mizzou Arena, UMC, Columbia
2016	2	Salisbury	30-1	Kenny Wyatt	70-46	West Platte	Iberia	65-63	Oran	Mizzou Arena, UMC, Columbia
2016	3	College Preparatory at Madison	31-2	Altonio Irons	67-52	St. Pius X	Lutheran North (St. Louis)	74-47	Fatima	Mizzou Arena, UMC, Columbia
2016	4	Republic	28-4	Treyvon Fisher	54-51	Normandy	Sikeston	55-54	Liberty North	Mizzou Arena, UMC, Columbia
2016	5	Rockhurst	26-5	Mark Nusbaum	73-59	DeSmet	Hickman	65-53	Vianney	Mizzou Arena, UMC, Columbia
2017	1	Scott County Central	26-5	Frank Staple	69-39	Meadville	Stanberry	55-54	Mack's Creek	Mizzou Arena, UCM, Columbia
2017	2	Sacred Heart (Sedalia)	31-0	Steve Goodwin	61-45	Iberia	Canton	61-54	Thayer	Mizzou Arena, UCM, Columbia
2017	3	Cardinal Ritter (St. Louis)	26-5	Marvin Neals	57-48	Barstow	Strafford	70-63	College Prep Madison	Mizzou Arena, UCM, Columbia
2017	4	Republic	27-4	Treyvon Fisher	45-42	Lafayette (St. Joseph)	Helias	60-53	Farmington	Mizzou Arena, UCM, Columbia
2017	5	Christian Brothers	25-7	Justin Tatum	86-77	Hickman (Columbia)	Lee's Summit West	70-58	Hazelwood Central	Mizzou Arena, UCM, Columbia
2018	1	Meadville	32-0	Drew Nier	50-46	Winston	Advance	69-53	Leeton	Mizzou Arena, UCM, Columbia
2018	2	Scott County Central	27-4	Frank Staple	53-48	Mid-Buchanan	Crane	63-40	Canton	Mizzou Arena, UCM, Columbia
2018	3	Barstow	29-2	Billy Thomas	61-46	Strafford	Central (New Madrid County)	58-50	The College Preparatory	Mizzou Arena, UCM, Columbia
2018	4	St. Charles	28-4	Rick Foster	74-69	Hillcrest	Notre Dame (Cape Girardeau)	65-44	Bolivar	Mizzou Arena, UCM, Columbia
2018	5	Blue Springs South	29-2	Jimmy Cain	71-57	Park Hill South	Chaminade	71-35	St. Louis University	Mizzou Arena, UCM, Columbia
2019	1	Greenwood Laboratory School	29-3	Darren Taylor	55-54	Oran	Van-Far	56-34	Plattsburg	JHQ Arena, MSU, Springfield
2019	2	Thayer	30-3	Cecil Meyer	52-35	Mid-Buchanan	Hartville	60-55	Clopton	JHQ Arena, MSU, Springfield
2019	3	Strafford	33-0	Steve Frank	61-53	Lutheran North (St. Louis)	Trenton	54-40	Licking	JHQ Arena, MSU, Springfield
2019	4	Incarnate Word Academy (Bel-Nor)	30-2	Dan Rolfes	61-35	Lincoln College Prep	Logan-Rogersville	54-33	Miller Career Academy (St. Louis)	JHQ Arena, MSU, Springfield
2019	5	North Kansas City	29-2	Jeff Lacy	43-34	Jefferson City	Parkway Central (St. Louis)	55-53	Republic	JHQ Arena, MSU, Springfield
2020	1	Walnut Grove	28-5	Rory Henry	52-41	Jefferson (Conception)/South Nodaway	No 3rd Place (COVID)	-	No 3rd Place (COVID)	JHQ Arena, MSU, Springfield
2020	2	East Buchanan	29-3	Cori Elms	62-51	Tipton	No 3rd Place (COVID)	-	No 3rd Place (COVID)	JHQ Arena, MSU, Springfield
2020	3	Strafford	30-3	Dustin Larsen	65-62	Licking	No 3rd Place (COVID)	-	No 3rd Place (COVID)	JHQ Arena, MSU, Springfield
2020	4	No Champion (COVID)	-	-	-	-	-	-	-	-
2020	5	No Champion (COVID)	-	-	-	-	-	-	-	-
2021	1	Jefferson (Conception)/South Nodaway	31-0	Tyler Pederson	56-44	Leeton	Walnut Grove	52-44	South Iron	JHQ Arena, MSU, Springfield
2021	2	Ellington	23-5	David Burrows	63-56	Wellington-Napolean	Blue Eye	59-52	Scotland County	JHQ Arena, MSU, Springfield
2021	3	Live for Life Academy Charter (St. Louis)	15-11	Chandra Palmer	56-52	Skyline (Urbana)	Steelville	45-44	Tipton	JHQ Arena, MSU, Springfield
2021	4	Boonville	27-2	Jaryt Hunziker	58-52	Mount Vernon	Vashon (St. Louis)	57-37	St. Joseph Benton	JHQ Arena, MSU, Springfield
2021	5	Whitfield (St. Louis)	27-4	Michael Slater	50-34	West Plains	Union	53-43	William Chrisman (Independence)	JHQ Arena, MSU, Springfield
2021	6	Incarnate Word Academy (Bel-Nor)	29-0	Dan Rolfes	58-37	Webster Groves	Springfield Kickapoo	79-47	Staley	JHQ Arena, MSU, Springfield
2022	1	Jefferson (Conception)/South Nodaway	28-2	Tyler Pederson	63-50	Delta	Leeton	58-39	Walnut Grove	JHQ Arena, MSU, Springfield
2022	2	Wellington-Napolean	28-2	Andy Hampton	52-31	Ellington	Blue Eye	59-19	St. Paul Lutheran(Concordia)	JHQ Arena, MSU, Springfield]
2022	3	El Dorado Springs	29-3	Beau J. Swopes	61-26	South Shelby	Strafford	64-34	West County	JHQ Arena, MSU, Springfield
2022	4	John Burroughs (St. Louis)	22-4	Jacob Yorg	54-46	St. Joseph Benton	Helias Catholic	51-40	St. James	JHQ Arena, MSU, Springfield
2022	5	West Plains	27-4	Scott Womack	50-37	Whitfield (St. Louis)	Webster Groves	54-33	Smithville	JHQ Arena, MSU, Springfield
2022	6	Incarnate Word Academy (Bel-Nor)	29-0	Dan Rolfes	67-50	Springfield Kickapoo	Blue Springs South	63-43	St. Joseph's Academy (St. Louis)	JHQ Arena, MSU, Springfield
2023	1	South Iron	28-4	Dusty Dinkins	56-47	St.Elizabeth	Jefferson (Conception)/South Nodaway	81-45	Glasgow	Great Southern Bank Arena, MSU, Springfield
2023	2	Salisbury	29-3	Kenny Wyatt	55-46	Principia (St. Louis)	Plattsburg	59-48	Hartville	Great Southern Bank Arena, MSU, Springfield
2023	3	Central (New Madrid County)	24-7	Lennis McFerren	56-46	Lutheran North (St. Louis)	Thayer	67-64	Lafayette County	Great Southern Bank Arena, MSU, Springfield
2023	4	Vashon (St. Louis)	25-7	Altonio Irons	64-37	Central (Park Hills)	Lafayette (St. Joseph)	78-57	Father Tolton Regional Catholic	Great Southern Bank Arena, MSU, Springfield
2023	5	Cardinal Ritter(St. Louis)	28-4	Ryan Johnson	65-54	Ladue Horton-Watkins (St. Louis)	Jefferson City	79-76	Pembroke Hill	Great Southern Bank Arena, MSU, Springfield
2023	6	Staley (Kansas City)	30-2	Chris Neff	49-32	Kickapoo (Springfield)	Troy Buchanan	40-32	Jackson	Great Southern Bank Arena, MSU, Springfield
2024	1	Chadwick	29-3	Tonya Rains	67-38	Braymer	Green City	66-50	Dadeville	Mizzou Arena, UCM, Columbia
2024	2	Hartville	29-2	Brett Reed	60-42	Weaubleau	Salisbury	77-66	South Pemiscot	Mizzou Arena, UCM, Columbia
2024	3	Central (New Madrid County)	28-3	Dontre Jenkins	86-65	Summit Christian	Thayer	61-49	Montgomery County	Mizzou Arena, UCM, Columbia
2024	4	Vashon	26-6	Tony Irons	68-37	John Burroughs	Logan-Rogersville	72-44	Central (Kansas City)	Mizzou Arena, UCM, Columbia
2024	5	De Smet Jesuit	27-5	Kent Williams	75-56	Jefferson City	Vianney	76-57	Winnetonka	Mizzou Arena, UCM, Columbia
2024	6	Cardinal Ritter	21-11	Ryan Johnson	52-42	Chaminade College Prep	Central (Springfield)	72-62	Oak Park	Mizzou Arena, UCM, Columbia
2025	1	Chadwick	23-7	Ethan Garrett	72-53	St. Elizabeth	Wheatland	57-53	Braymer	Mizzou Arena, UCM, Columbia
2025	2	Eugene	28-4	Brian Wilde	72-61	Canton	Puxico	61-38	Lincoln	Mizzou Arena, UCM, Columbia
2025	3	Principia	31-1	Jay Blossom	76-56	KIPP KC Legacy Charter	Thayer	68-61	Woodland	Mizzou Arena, UCM, Columbia
2025	4	Vashon	27-2	Jimmy McKinney Jr.	81-45	Benton	Logan-Rogersville	54-36	Potosi	Mizzou Arena, UCM, Columbia
2025	5	Webster Groves	27-5	Justin Mathes	67-56	Summit Christian	Westminster Christian	51-49	Parkview	Mizzou Arena, UCM, Columbia
2025	6	Oak Park	31-1	Sherron Collins	68-60	Chaminade College Prep	Nixa	56-33	Lafayette (Wildwood)	Mizzou Arena, UCM, Columbia
2026	1	Bunker	30-2	Rod Gorman	61-54	Brunswick	Faith Christian Academy	64-37	Kingsville	Mizzou Arena, UCM, Columbia
2026	2	Eugene	27-5	Brian Wilde	71-56	Hayti	Penney	50-25	Clopton	Mizzou Arena, UCM, Columbia
2026	3	Principia	29-2	Jay Blossom	98-34	Miller Career Academy	North Platte	61-57	Liberty (Mountain View)	Mizzou Arena, UCM, Columbia
2026	4	Logan-Rogersville	29-3	John Schaefer	72-36	Clayton	Benton	84-81	Vashon	Mizzou Arena, UCM, Columbia
2026	5	MICDS	27-4	Trevor Wallace	55-38	Sikeston	Hillcrest	57-51	Raytown South	Mizzou Arena, UCM, Columbia
2026	6	De Smet Jesuit	27-5	Kent Williams	78-61	Blue Springs South	Rockhurst	68-55	Cardinal Ritter	Mizzou Arena, UCM, Columbia

== Number of titles won by school ==
School	Number of titles	Years won
Advance	2	1972, 1975
The Barstow School (Kansas City)	2	1995, 2015
Beaumont	6	1933, 1942, 1943, 1947, 1948, 1956
Bell City	2	2002, 2004
Benton (St. Joseph)	2	1931, 1941
Billings	1	2012
Bishop DuBourg (St. Louis)	1	1964
Bishop LeBlond (St. Joseph)	1	1977
Bismarck	1	1944
Blair Oaks	1	2001
Blue Springs South	1	2015
Bolivar	1	1960
Bowling Green	1	1962
Bradleyville	3	1962, 1967, 1968
Branson	2	1955, 1958
Buffalo	3	1949, 1964, 1965
Bunker	1	2026
Camdenton	2	1939, 1941
Cardinal Ritter (St. Louis)	9	1990, 1995, 1996, 2003, 2006, 2010, 2014, 2023, 2024
Center (Kansas City)	1	1976
Central (Cape Girardeau)	2	1954, 1980
Central (Kansas City)	3	1930, 1966, 1979
Central (New Madrid County)	5	1988, 2000, 2001, 2023, 2024
Centralia	1	2004
Chadwick	2	2024, 2025
Chaminade College Preparatory (St. Louis)	2	2009, 2016
Charleston	11	1975, 1980, 1983, 1986, 1987, 1989, 1990, 1992, 1996, 2007, 2012
Chillicothe	1	1981
Christian Brothers College Preparatory (St. Louis)	6	1933, 1959, 1960, 1963, 1997, 2014
Cleveland (St. Louis)	1	1953
College Preparatory at Madison	1	2013
Conway	1	1945
Crane	1	2011
DeSmet Jesuit (St. Louis)	7	1973, 1978, 1979, 1982, 1999, 2024, 2026
Dixon	1	1969
East (Kansas City)	1	1929
East Carter	2	1997, 2003
Eminence	2	2013, 2018
Eskridge	3	1984, 1988, 2007
Eugene	2	2025, 2026
Exeter	1	1963
Father Tolton (Columbia)	1	2016
Festus	1	1991
Fordland	1	1998
Forsyth	1	1973
Fruitland	1	1932
Glasgow	3	1974, 1978, 1980
Goodman	1	1964
Grandview	1	2018
Greenwood Laboratory School (Springfield)	1	1942, 2019
Harrisburg	2	2006, 2008
Hartville	2	2016, 2024
Hayti	1	1983
Hermann	1	1970
David H. Hickman (Columbia)	2	1936, 1962
Hillcrest (Springfield)	2	1984, 2010
Bishop Hogan Preparatory Academy	2	2011, 2018
Hollister	1	1999
Houston	1	1938
Jackson	1	1934
Jefferson (Conception Junction)	4	2000, 2006, 2007, 2008
Jefferson City	1	1993
John Burroughs School (St. Louis)	1	1953
Joplin	4	1939, 1950, 1955, 1967
Kearney	2	1961, 2010
Kickapoo (Springfield)	1	2003
Lafayette (St. Joseph)	1	1976
Lathrop	1	1985
Lesterville	1	1977
Liberty	1	1998
Licking	1	1989
Lilbourn	2	1974, 1975
Lillis (Kansas City)	1	1961
Lockwood	1	1994
Logan-Rogersville	2	1982, 2026
Lutheran North (St. Louis)	2	2002, 2005
Lutheran South (St. Louis)	1	1973
Malden	1	1985
Manual (Kansas City)	1	1971
Maplewood-Richmond Heights	2	2008, 2009
Marion C. Early	1	1982
Marionville	2	1982, 2005
Maryville	1	1937
Matthews	1	1968
McBride (St. Louis)	1	1940
McCluer (Florissant)	2	1974, 1975
McCluer North (Florrisant)	3	2007, 2011, 2012
McKinley Classical Leadership Academy (St. Louis)	1	1984
Meadville	1	2015
Memorial (Joplin)	2	1977, 1978
Mexico	1	1995
MICDS (St. Louis)	2	2002, 2026
Montgomery City	1	1972
Mound City	1	1981
New Haven	8	1956, 1957, 1958, 1959, 1970, 1997, 1999, 2001
Nixa	2	1978, 1999
Normandy (St. Louis)	1	1951
North Pemiscot	1	1981
North Shelby	1	2005
Northeast (Kansas City)	2	1927, 1935
Notre Dame (Cape Girardeau)	3	1986, 1987, 2008
O'Fallon Tech	1	1968
Oak Park	1	2025
Oran	1	2017
Oregon	1	1928
Owensville	2	1966, 1974
Ozark	2	1950, 2003
Archbishop O’Hara (Kansas City)	1	2005
Palmyra	2	1979, 1998
Parkview (Springfield)	1	1965
Parkway West (St. Louis)	1	1991
Pembroke Hill School (Kansas City)	2	1956, 1957
Poplar Bluff	2	2004, 2005
Portageville	5	1991, 1992, 1993, 1994, 2009
Principia	2	2025, 2026
Puxico	2	1951, 1952
Raytown South	4	1970, 1972, 1977, 1990
Republic	3	1963, 2013, 2014
Richland (Essex)	1	1996
Riverview Gardens (St. Louis)	1	1992
Rockhurst (Kansas City)	4	1932, 1987, 1989, 2013
Ruskin	1	2007
Salisbury	2	2013, 2023
Sacred Heart (Sedalia)	1	2014
Scott County Central (Sikeston)	18	1976, 1979, 1980, 1983, 1985, 1986, 1987, 1988, 1989, 1990, 1991, 1993, 2009, 2010, 2011, 2012, 2014, 2015
Sikeston	1	2011
Soldan International Studies (St. Louis)	2	1981, 2012
South Iron	2	1965, 2023
Sparta	1	1954
Springfield Catholic	1	1984
St. Agnes (Springfield)	1	1959
St. Charles	2	1957, 2015
St. Charles West	1	1995
St. Francis Borgia (Washington)	5	1993, 1994, 1998, 2006, 2009
St. George (Hermann)	1	1969
St. James	1	1976
St. Louis University High	4	1946, 1952, 1958, 1961
Staley (Kansas City)	1	2023
Stanberry	2	1971, 2016
Sturgeon	1	2010
Charles H. Sumner (St. Louis)	1	1969
Northwest Academy (St. Louis)	1	2017
Van Buren	2	1960, 1992
Van-Far	2	2004, 2018
Vashon (St. Louis)	16	1971, 1983, 1985, 1986, 1988, 1994, 2000, 2001, 2002, 2004, 2006, 2016, 2017, 2023, 2024, 2025
Verona	1	2003
Walnut Grove	1	2017
Warrensburg	1	1967
Webb City	1	1997
Webster Groves	5	1996, 2008, 2017, 2018, 2025
Whitfield School (St. Louis)	1	2000
Wright City	1	1966
Zalma	1	1940

== See also ==
- Mr. Show-Me Basketball
- Miss Show-Me Basketball
- List of Missouri state high school girls basketball championships
- List of Missouri state high school girls volleyball championships
- List of Missouri state high school baseball champions
- List of Missouri state high school football champions
- List of Missouri high schools by athletic conferences
