= Jerry Berger =

American journalist (1933–2021)

Gerald Allen Berger (June 30, 1933 – January 5, 2021) was an American press agent and journalist. He was known in the St. Louis, Missouri area for his columns in the St. Louis Globe-Democrat and the St. Louis Post-Dispatch.

== Biography ==
Berger was born in St. Louis, Missouri, to Julius Berger and Rae Cohen. He was of Hungarian ancestry on his father's side and Russian ancestry on his mother's side. His father was a plumber. Berger was Jewish. He graduated from Soldan-Blewett High School in St. Louis. He was enrolled at St. Louis College of Pharmacy.

In his twenties, Berger was employed by the local branch of Metro-Goldwyn-Mayer as a booker of films, while simultaneously entering management at the local Loew's Theatres. Subsequently, he joined 20th Century-Fox Film Corporation.

The launch-pad for Berger was an appointment as advertising publicity manager of 20th Century-Fox's far-flung operations in the Republic of South Africa. He headquartered in Johannesburg, South Africa. After some time, he returned to the states to fill a marketing position at 20th Century-Fox's New York headquarters. He eventually accepted an offer of a marketing position with Paramount Pictures. He worked both in New York and Hollywood. His marketing expertise was employed on such motion pictures as Becket (1964), The Ten Commandments (1956) (reissue), and Alfie (1966). Berger struck up a friendship with Otto Preminger.

He was also a press agent and publicist with such personalities as Joan Crawford, Rock Hudson, Leonard Bernstein, Cary Grant, Frank Sinatra, and Rudolf Nureyev, among others.

In 1968, Berger returned to St. Louis, where he joined the Municipal Opera as operations director. Ten years later, he accepted the position as people columnist with the St. Louis Globe-Democrat. After the newspaper folded, he joined the St. Louis Post-Dispatch, where he continued to write daily columns and features for 24 years, while sporadically broadcasting entertainment reviews on television and Hollywood gossip on KMOX Radio, the CBS affiliate.

He retired in 2004 after thousands of columns for the Post-Dispatch; he was working on a book at the time of his retirement.

=== Personal life and death ===
Berger had an illegitimate son he never met.

Berger was banned from visiting the Post-Dispatch due to "inappropriate behavior" in 2009. In 2013, Berger pled guilty to sexual misconduct, following an incident in which he groped a man in a check-out line.

Berger moved to Florida in 2017. He died on January 5, 2021, aged 87, from natural causes in Coral Springs, Florida. He was survived by his husband, Victor Isart.
