= Hogan Preparatory Academy =

Coordinates: 39.010689°N 94.572029°W

Location
- 1331 E. Meyer Boulevard; Kansas City, Missouri 64131; United States

Information
- School type: Public, Charter
- Established: 1942
- Principal: Stephanie Bland
- Grades: 9 to 12
- Enrollment: 324 (2023–2024)
- Campus: Urban
- Colors: Maroon; Orange; Grey
- Mascot: Rams
- Website: School Website

Hogan Preparatory Academy is a charter school in Kansas City, Missouri. As of March 2022 it had an enrollment of 450, of which 98 percent were African American.

== History ==
The school was founded as a Catholic high school in 1942 and was named for John Joseph Hogan, the first bishop of the Diocese of Kansas City. It became a charter school in 1999.

== Athletics ==
The school won its first state championship in boys' basketball in 2011 and won again in 2018.

=== State championships ===
State Championships
Season	Sport	Number of Championships	Year
Winter	Basketball, Boys	2	2011; 2018
Total		2	

== Notable alumni ==
- Class of 1948 - Joseph Hubert Hart, Catholic bishop
- Class of 1951 - Dolores Michaels, actress
- Class of 1969 - Sly James, Kansas City mayor
- Class of 2008 - Marcus Denmon, basketball player
- Class of 2011 - De'Vante Bausby, American football player
- Class of 2016 - William Bradley-King, American football player
