= Raynard Jackson =

American political consultant

- Born: St. Louis, Missouri, U.S.
- Education: Oral Roberts University (BS); George Mason University (MA)
- Occupations: Political consultant, radio host
- Political party: Republican

Raynard Jackson is an American Republican political consultant, lobbyist, and radio host based in Washington, D.C. Notably, he worked on the presidential campaigns of George H. W. Bush and George W. Bush.

== Early life and education ==
Jackson is a native of St. Louis, Missouri and attended Soldan High School. He received a Bachelor of Science in accounting from Oral Roberts University in Tulsa, Oklahoma, and a Master of Arts in International Business from George Mason University in Fairfax, Virginia.

== Career ==
Jackson has worked on Republican United States Senate, gubernatorial, and congressional political campaigns. He is the president and CEO of Raynard Jackson & Associates, LLC (RJA), a lobbying firm based in Washington, D.C. He hosts an Internet-based radio show on U.S. Talk Network.

Jackson is a supporter of Donald Trump. He has criticized liberal political commentators like Joy Reid and Don Lemon, claiming that they "are killing more black folks than any white person with a sheet over their face."

== See also ==
- Black conservatism in the United States
