= Will Bradley-King =

American football player (born 1997)

William Bradley-King
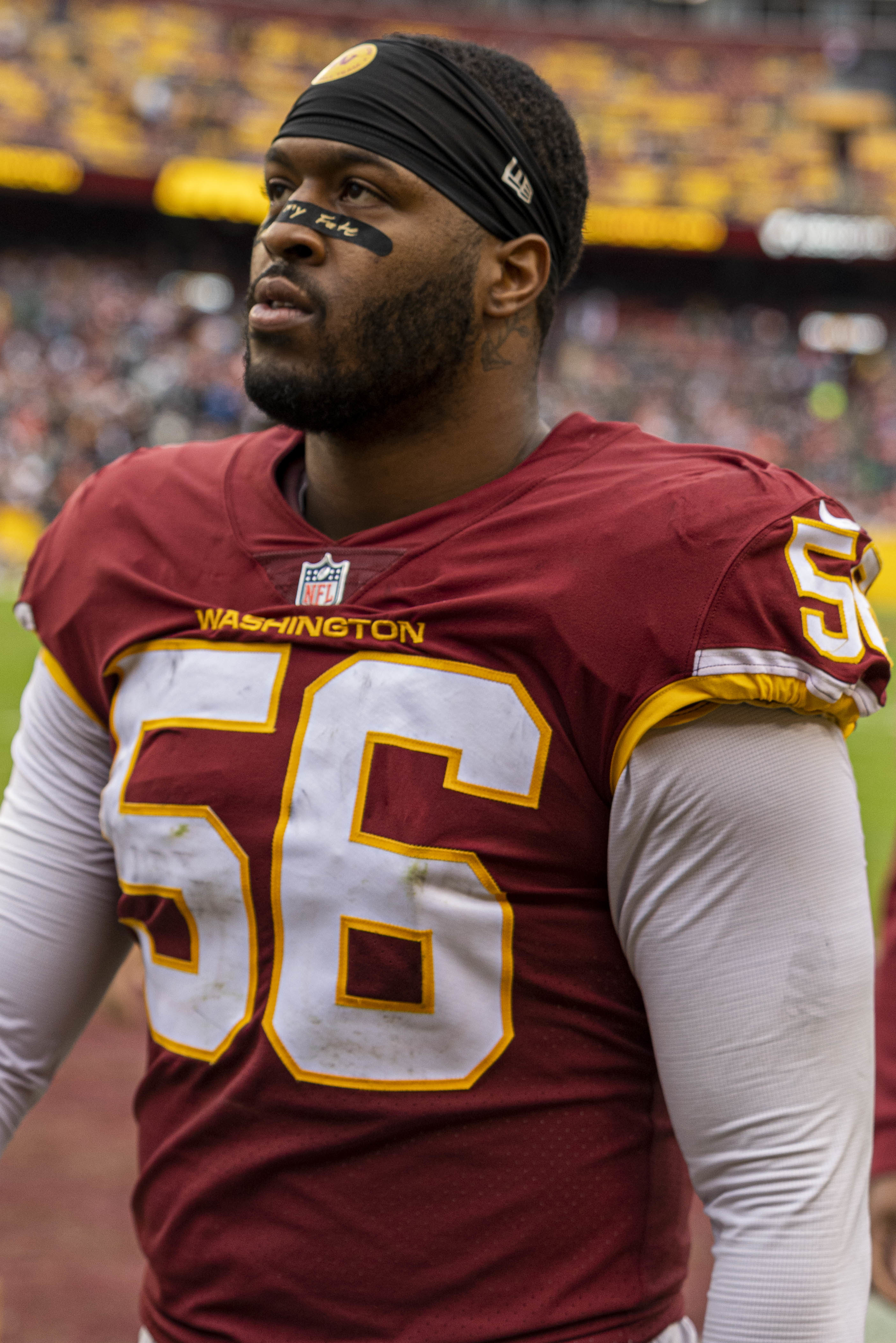
- Bradley-King with the Washington Football Team in 2022

Profile
- Position: Linebacker

Personal information
- Born: December 22, 1997 (age 28); Kansas City, Missouri, U.S.
- Listed height: 6 ft 4 in (1.93 m)
- Listed weight: 265 lb (120 kg)

Career information
- High school: Hogan Preparatory Academy (Kansas City)
- College: Arkansas State (2016–2019); Baylor (2020)
- NFL draft: 2021: 7th round, 240th overall pick

Career history
- Washington Football Team / Commanders (2021–2023); New England Patriots (2023–2024)*; Miami Dolphins (2024)*; San Francisco 49ers (2025–2026)*
- * Offseason or practice squad member only

Awards and highlights
- First-team All-Sun Belt (2019); Second-team All-Sun Belt (2018)

Career NFL statistics as of 2023
- Total tackles: 7
- Sacks: 0.5
- Stats at Pro Football Reference

William Bradley-King (born December 22, 1997) is an American professional football linebacker. He played college football for the Arkansas State Red Wolves and Baylor Bears and was selected by Washington Commanders in the seventh round of the 2021 NFL draft.

== Professional career ==
Pre-draft measurables
Height	Weight	Arm length	Hand span	Wingspan	40-yard dash	10-yard split	20-yard split	20-yard shuttle	Three-cone drill	Vertical jump	Broad jump
6 ft 3 1/2 in (1.92 m)	252 lb (114 kg)	33 1/2 in (0.85 m)	10 1/4 in (0.26 m)	6 ft 8 1/8 in (2.04 m)	4.75 s	1.59 s	2.71 s	4.29 s	7.10 s	34.5 in (0.88 m)	9 ft 11 in (3.02 m)
All values from Pro Day

=== Washington Football Team / Commanders ===
Bradley-King was drafted by the Washington Football Team in the seventh round (240th overall) of the 2021 NFL draft. He signed his four-year rookie contract on May 13, 2021. Bradley-King was released on August 31, 2021, but re-signed to the practice squad the following day.

On December 13, 2021, he was placed on the COVID-19 reserve list and was activated on December 22. Bradley-King signed to the active roster on January 8, 2022.

On August 30, 2022, Bradley-King was waived by the Commanders and signed to the practice squad the next day. He signed a reserve/future contract on January 9, 2023.

On August 29, 2023, Bradley-King was waived by the Commanders and re-signed to the practice squad. He was released on September 6, 2023, but re-signed to the active roster two days later. He was waived on September 11, but re-signed with the practice squad three days later. On October 14, 2023, he was released from the practice squad.

=== New England Patriots ===
On October 18, 2023, the New England Patriots signed Bradley-King to their practice squad. He signed a reserve/future contract with New England on January 8, 2024. Bradley-King was waived by the Patriots on August 26.

=== Miami Dolphins ===
On August 30, 2024, Bradley-King was signed to the Miami Dolphins' practice squad. He signed a reserve/future contract with Miami on January 7, 2025. On May 22, Bradley-King was waived by the Dolphins.

=== San Francisco 49ers ===
On August 14, 2025, Bradley-King signed with the San Francisco 49ers. He was waived on August 26 as part of final roster cuts and re-signed to the practice squad the next day. Bradley-King was released by San Francisco on August 29. On September 24, Bradley-King signed with the 49ers' practice squad.

On January 20, 2026, Bradley-King signed a reserve/futures contract with San Francisco. On July 29, Bradley-King was waived by the 49ers with an injury designation.
