= Leah Rachel Yoffie =

American educator

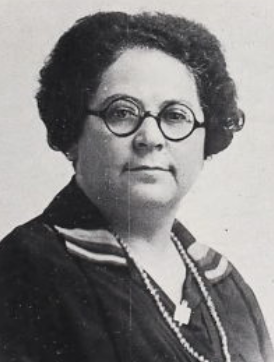
- Leah Rachel Yoffie, from the 1927 yearbook of Washington University in St. Louis
- Born: April 15, 1883; Ekaterinoslav, Russian Empire (now Dnipro, Ukraine)
- Died: May 9, 1956 (aged 73); Clearwater, Florida, US

Academic background
- Education: Washington University in St. Louis; University of Pennsylvania; University of North Carolina
- Thesis: Creation, the angels, and the fall of man in Milton's Paradise lost and Paradise regained and in the work of Sir Richard Blackmore (1942)
- Influences: Franz Boas

Academic work
- Discipline: Folklore, poetry, political science, Jewish American culture
- Institutions: Cottey College

Leah Rachel Clara Yoffie (April 15, 1883 – May 9, 1956) was an American writer, educator, and folklorist. She was a teacher in St. Louis, Missouri, earned a Ph.D. in English in her fifties, and published both poetry and folklore studies influenced by her Jewish immigrant experience.

== Early life and education ==
Yoffie was born in Ekaterinoslav, Russian Empire (now known as Dnipro in eastern Ukraine), the daughter of Abraham Yoffie. Her family was Jewish. She moved to the United States with her family as a girl in 1891, and became a naturalized United States citizen in 1909. She earned a bachelor's degree from Washington University in St. Louis in 1911, then earned a master's degree at the University of Pennsylvania. In her fifties, she earned a Ph.D. in English from the University of North Carolina. Her dissertation was titled "Creation, the angels, and the fall of man in Milton's Paradise lost and Paradise regained and in the work of Sir Richard Blackmore" (1942).

== Career ==
Yoffie taught night classes in English for immigrants in St. Louis, Missouri while she was in college. She taught English and civics from 1915 to 1931 at Soldan High School in St. Louis. From 1944 to 1949 she was a professor of English and political science at Cottey College in Missouri. During her teaching career and in retirement, she also published poems and articles on folklore, many of them in national publications. She was encouraged by anthropologist Franz Boas to study Jewish immigrant culture in St. Louis, and many of her scholarly writings are on this subject.

A collection of Yoffie's poems was published in 1926, under the title Dark Altar Stairs. "There is a completeness and crystal clearness about each poem that is worthy of mention in this day of fragmentary poetry," wrote one reviewer in a St. Louis newspaper. "Miss Yoffie has attained a singing quality and a certain sweep and power in some of her lyrics, rare in this day of poetic fads and unpoetic fancies." She wrote further poetry and took photographs during her several visits to Palestine.

== Publications ==
=== Poetry and fiction ===
- "Ad Gloriam" (1913, poem)
- "The Immigrant" (1913, poem)
- "Russia" (1916, poem)
- "A Cry of the Foreign Born" (1920, poem)
- "A Prayer for the Great White Fast" (1920, poem)
- "Faith" (1920, poem)
- "Sarah Miriam Goes to College" (1922, short story)
- "Reb Sholom Dovid" (1923, short story)
- "A Voice" (1923, poem)
- "The Lost Vision" (1924, poem)
- Dark Altar Stairs (1926, poetry collection)
- "Poems of Palestine" (1929, five short poems and five photographs by Yoffie)

=== Scholarship ===
- "Present-Day Survivals of Ancient Jewish Customs" (1916)
- "Yiddish Proverbs, Sayings, etc., in St. Louis, Mo." (1920)
- "Popular Beliefs and Customs among the Yiddish-Speaking Jews of St. Louis, Mo." (1925)
- "Three Generations of Children's Singing Games in St. Louis" (1947)
- "Songs of the 'Twelve Numbers' and the Hebrew Chant of 'Echod mi Yodea'" (1949)
- "Chaucer's 'White Paternoster,' Milton's Angels, and a Hebrew Night Prayer" (1951)

== Personal life and legacy ==
Yoffie was a short person, under five feet in height. She retired to Florida in 1955. She died in Clearwater, Florida, in 1956, at the age of 73. She left her estate, over US$14,000 (equivalent to $165,789 in 2025), to the Jewish Federation of St. Louis, to fund scholarships.
