= Mayor of the Town (radio program) =

U.S. radio comedy-drama (1942-49)

- Genre: Comedy-drama
- Running time: 30 minutes
- Country of origin: United States
- Language: English
- Syndicates: NBC; CBS; ABC; Mutual
- Starring: Lionel Barrymore; Agnes Moorehead; Conrad Binyon
- Announcer: Harlow Wilcox; Frank Martin; Ken Peters
- Written by: Jean Holloway; Leonard St. Clair; Howard Blake; Howard Breslin; Charles Tazwell; Erna Lazarus
- Directed by: Jack Van Nostrand
- Produced by: Murray Bolen; Knowles Entrikin
- Original release: September 6, 1942 – July 3, 1949
- Sponsored by: Rinso; Noxzema; Mutual Benefit Life Insurance Company

Mayor of the Town is a radio comedy-drama in the United States. From September 6, 1942, to July 3, 1949, it was broadcast at various times on NBC, CBS, ABC and Mutual.

== Format ==
Lionel Barrymore starred as the unnamed mayor of Springdale, a community typical of those in other radio programs of the era, such as Summerfield in The Great Gildersleeve and River's End in Dr. Christian. Stories dealt with typical small-town situations that involved the mayor. The mayor's housekeeper, Marilly (Agnes Moorehead), and his ward, Butch (Conrad Binyon) usually played key roles in episodes. One old-time radio reference noted the similarity of Mayor of the Town's plots to those of The Great Gildersleeve, citing "the grumbling but kindly mayor interacting with a number of interesting town characters."

A 1947 review of the program in the trade publication Billboard had little positive to say. The writer opined that except for selling the sponsor's product, Mayor of the Town "is otherwise devoid of merit." By way of explanation, he added, "From its very inception, almost every phase of 'Mayor of the Town' is the most palpable of contrivance; stock characters, stock plot and the lowest grade of corn."

In contrast, radio historian John Dunning commented that Mayor of the Town "gave a realistic portrait of rural living." "Often the stories were coming-of-age pieces," he wrote, "focusing on the mayor's special relationship with Butch."

== Personnel ==
In addition to Barrymore, Moorehead and Binyon, actors on Mayor of the Town included Gloria McMillan (Sharlee Bronson, Butch's girlfriend), Priscilla Lyon (Holly-Ann, the mayor's granddaughter) and Bill Wright (the sheriff). Dunning noted that Barrymore's involvement went beyond his acting. "He insisted on meticulous attention to detail, even though others were in charge of production. Barrymore had a way of knowing what lines were wrong and why."

The announcer was Frank Martin. Wilbur Hatch led the orchestra. Music directors were Gordon Jenkins and Bernard Katz. Con Maffie played organ for the show.

Arthur Trask was producer and director; Jack Van Nostrand. also directed. Writers were Howard Blake, Leonard St. Clair, Howard Breslin, Charles Tazwell, Jean Holloway and Erna Lazarus.

== Schedule ==
Mayor of the Town began its radio run on September 6, 1942 with a brief 4-week run on NBC. It was used to fill in a gap that had occurred after Edna May Oliver's ill health forced her to quit her summer series, The Remarkable Miss Tuttle. Mayor of the Town then immediately moved to CBS, where it ran until May 31, 1947. ABC subsequently picked it up starting October 8. 1947, where it ran until June 30, 1948. On January 2, 1949, the program moved to Mutual, where it was broadcast on Sundays at 7:30 p.m. Eastern Time.

== Television version ==
In 1954, a syndicated television version of Mayor of the Town aired in the United States. It starred Thomas Mitchell as Mayor Thomas Russell, Kathleen Freeman as Marilly, and David Saber as Butch.
