= Ronald Himes =

American actor, director, and producer (born 1952)

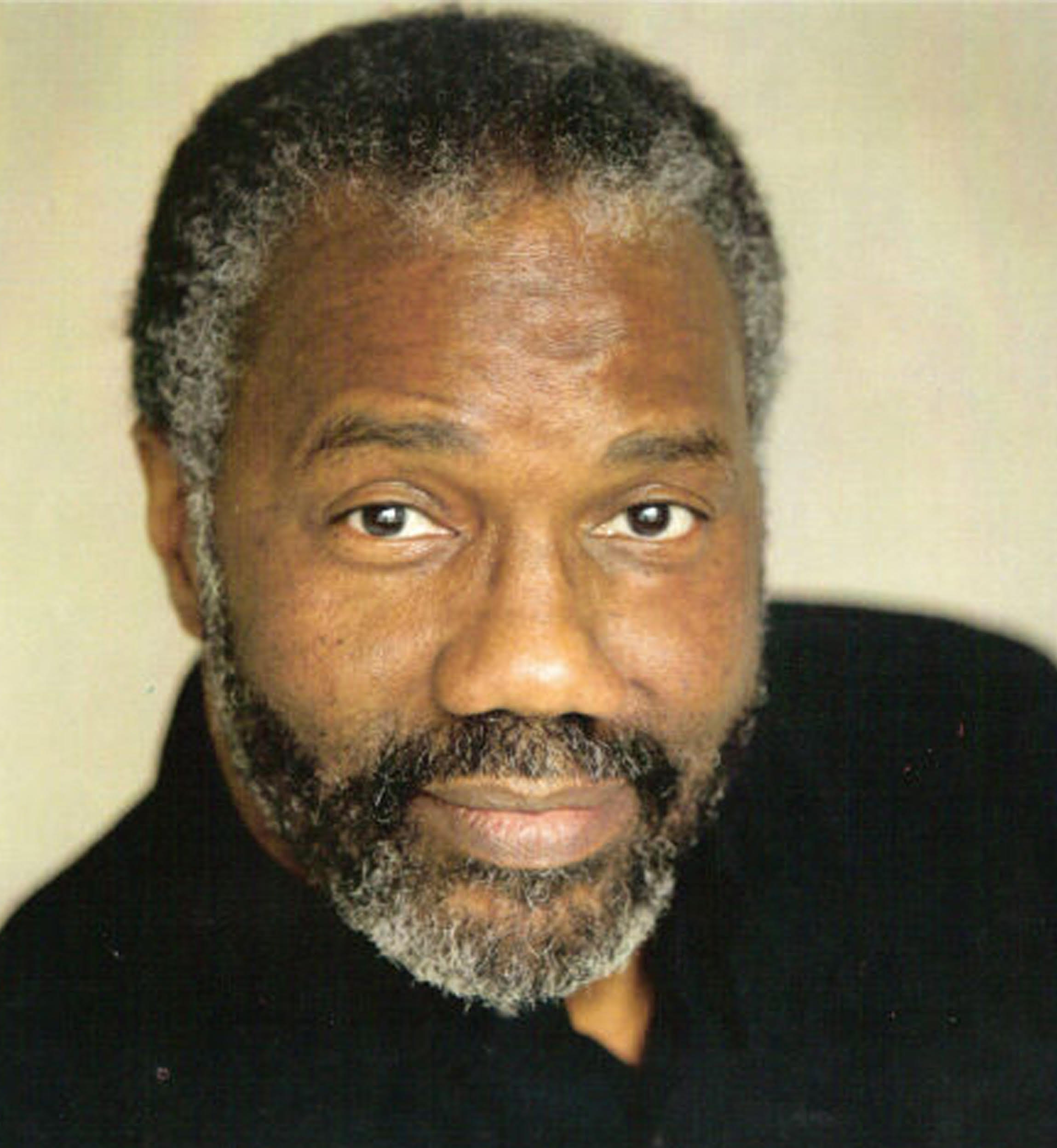
Ronald Himes

Ronald Himes (born June 30, 1952) is an American theatrical producer, director and actor. He established The St. Louis Black Repertory Company in 1976. He also is the Henry E. Hampton, Jr. Artist-in-Residence, a joint appointment of the Performing Arts Department and African and African American Studies at Washington University in St. Louis.

Himes received an honorary doctorate in Fine Arts from the University of Missouri–St. Louis in 1993, and an honorary doctorate in Arts from Washington University in St. Louis in 1998.

== Early life and education ==
Ronald Himes was born in St. Louis, Missouri on June 30, 1952. He graduated from Soldan International Studies High School, and in 1978 he graduated with a bachelor's degree in business from Washington University in St. Louis.

He founded the Phoenix Theatre Troupe in 1976 while an undergraduate student at Washington University in St. Louis (later becoming The St. Louis Black Repertory Company), saying, "The goal was to fill the void of black actors on stage. It was really about showcasing African-American stories, because our stories weren't being told."

Following his graduation from Washington University, Himes led the St. Louis Black Repertory Company on tours of local colleges, and in 1981 the company got a permanent venue in St. Louis.

== Filmography ==
| Year | Film | Role |
|---|---|---|
| 2010 | Kingshighway | Pender |
| 2025 | On Fire | Hospital Worker |

== Theatre ==
=== Actor ===
- 1987, The Little Foxes, Cal, Repertory Theatre of St. Louis
- 1992, Miss Evers' Boys, Dr. Eugene Brodus, Repertory Theatre of St. Louis
- 1993, Unquestioned Integrity: The Hill/Thomas Hearings, Clarence Thomas, 7 Stages Theatre
- 2002, The Sty of the Blind Pig, Doc, The Black Rep
- 2002, Conversations on a Dirt Road, Joe Lee, The St. Louis Black Repertory Company
- 2006, King Hedley II, King Hedley, The St. Louis Black Repertory Company
- 2007, Boesman & Lena, Boesman, The St. Louis Black Repertory Company
- 2007, Gem of the Ocean, Caesar, The St. Louis Black Repertory Company
- 2008, Death and the King's Horseman, Elesin, The St. Louis Black Repertory Company
- 2012, Ma Rainey's Black Bottom, Toledo, The St. Louis Black Repertory Company
- 2012, On Golden Pond, Norman Thayer, The St. Louis Black Repertory Company
- 2013, The Whipping Man, Simon, The St. Louis Black Repertory Company
- 2015, All The Way, Ralph Abernathy, The Repertory Theatre of St Louis
- 2015, Romeo and Juliet, Capulet, The St. Louis Black Repertory Company
- 2016, Sunset Baby, Kenyatta Shakur, The St. Louis Black Repertory Company
- 2017, Seven Guitars, King Hedley, The St. Louis Black Repertory Company
- 2017, Fences, Troy Maxson, The St. Louis Black Repertory Company
- 2020, Two Trains Running, The St. Louis Black Repertory Company
- 2023, Death of a Salesman, Willy Loman, The St. Louis Black Repertory Company
- 2024, Dreamgirls, Marty, Municipal Theatre Association of St. Louis

=== Director ===
- 1990, Spell #7, by Ntozake Shange, Studio Theatre
- 1992, Spunk, adapted for the stage by George C. Wolfe, music by Chic Street Man, based on three short stories by Zora Neale Hurston, Studio Theatre
- 1995, For Colored Girls Who Have Considered Suicide/When The Rainbow is Enfu, by Ntozake Shange, People's Light and Theatre Company
- 2007, Fences, by August Wilson, The Clarence Brown Theatre
- 2008, Ain't Misbehavin', The Clarence Brown Theatre
- 2008, Radio Golf, by August Wilson, Studio Theatre
- 2019, Dutchman, by LeRoi Jones and Amiri Baraka, Nebraska Rep
- 2021, Highway 1, U.S.A., by William Grant Still, Opera Theatre St Louis
- 2024, A Raisin in the Sun, by Lorraine Hansberry, The University of South Carolina
- 2024, Ligeia Mare: The Radio Opera, Episode 4, by Damon Davis with Alarm Will Sound, Carnegie Hall
