= De'Vante Bausby =

American football player (born 1993)

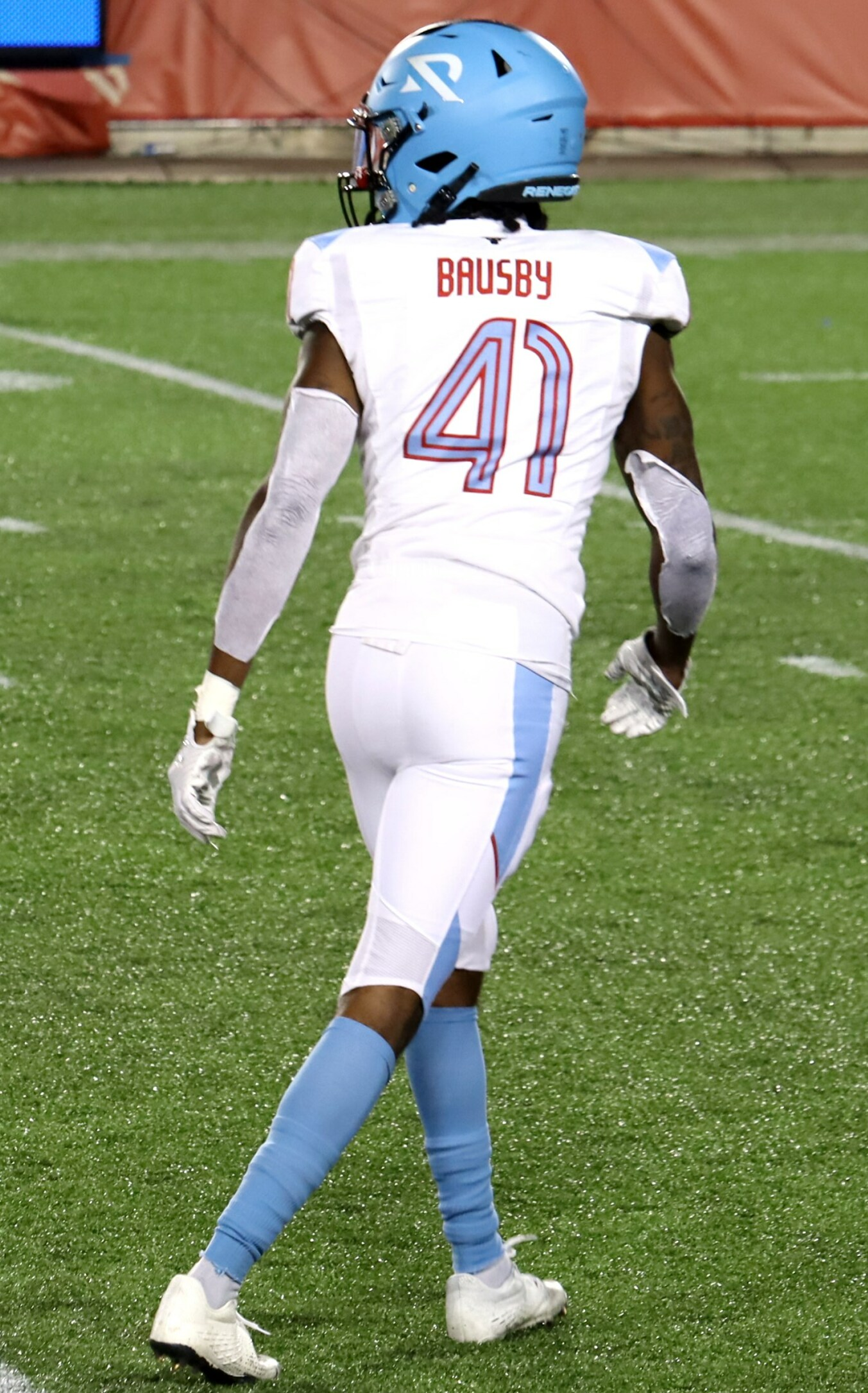
- Bausby with the Arlington Renegades in 2023

No. 20, 41, 13, 25
- Position: Cornerback

Personal information
- Born: January 15, 1993 (age 33); Kansas City, Missouri, U.S.
- Listed height: 6 ft 1 in (1.85 m)
- Listed weight: 177 lb (80 kg)

Career information
- High school: Hogan Preparatory Academy (Kansas City)
- College: Pittsburg State
- NFL draft: 2015: undrafted

Career history
- Kansas City Chiefs (2015)*; Chicago Bears (2015–2016); Kansas City Chiefs (2017)*; Philadelphia Eagles (2017–2018); San Antonio Commanders (2019); Denver Broncos (2019–2020); Arizona Cardinals (2020); Denver Broncos (2020); Las Vegas Raiders (2021)*; New England Patriots (2021); New Jersey Generals (2022); Washington Commanders (2022)*; Arlington Renegades (2023)
- * Offseason or practice squad member only

Awards and highlights
- Super Bowl champion (LII); XFL champion (2023)

Career NFL statistics
- Total tackles: 60
- Pass deflections: 8
- Stats at Pro Football Reference

De'Vante Bausby (born January 15, 1993) is an American former professional football player who was a cornerback in the National Football League (NFL). He played college football for the Pittsburg State Gorillas. He was also a member of several teams in the Alliance of American Football (AAF), United States Football League (USFL), and XFL.

== Early life ==
Bausby was born in Kansas City, Missouri, to Hosea Bausby and Tasha Word. He played football at Hogan Preparatory Academy where he earned All-State honors in both defensive back and wide receiver positions between 2008 and 2010. Bausby's career totals included 88 caught passes and 15 touchdowns. He recorded a defensive career total of 178 tackles and 22 interceptions. He credits his father and uncle for nurturing his lifelong love for football.

== College career ==
As a cornerback, Bausby played in all 14 games for Pittsburg State University, starting his freshman season in 2011. On November 12, Bausby scored his first and only touchdown while returning a blocked punt against Missouri Southern. During his freshman season, Bausby recorded 20 tackles and one interception. On December 10, Bausby recorded five tackles and an interception during the NCAA Division II semifinals against Delta State. He played all 10 games during his sophomore season in 2012, recording 21 tackles. Of his 21-season tackles, Bausby made eight tackles, a sack and an interception during the September 8 game against Central Oklahoma. By his junior season, Bausby started 11 of the total 12 games of the 2013 season, recording 39 tackles and earning third-team All-Mid-America Intercollegiate Athletics Association (MIAA) honors. By 2015, Bausby earned a Bachelor of Business Administration (BBA).

== Professional career ==
Pre-draft measurables
| Height | Weight | Arm length | Hand span | 40-yard dash | 10-yard split | 20-yard split | 20-yard shuttle | Three-cone drill | Vertical jump | Broad jump | Bench press |
|---|---|---|---|---|---|---|---|---|---|---|---|
| 6 ft 0 5/8 in (1.84 m) | 177 lb (80 kg) | 30 5/8 in (0.78 m) | 9 3/8 in (0.24 m) | 4.58 s | 1.56 s | 2.52 s | 4.32 s | 7.24 s | 37.5 in (0.95 m) | 11 ft 0 in (3.35 m) | 14 reps |
All values from NFL Pro Days

=== Kansas City Chiefs (first stint) ===
Bausby signed with the Kansas City Chiefs as an undrafted free agent. He broke his collarbone during mini-camp in June 2015 and was released by the Chiefs with an injury designation.

=== Chicago Bears ===
On December 22, 2015, after completing the rehab from his collarbone injury, Bausby was signed to the Bears' practice squad and signed a reserve/futures contract with the team on January 4. He was released on September 3, 2016, and was signed to the practice squad the next day. He was promoted to the active roster on October 10, 2016. He was released on November 19, 2016, but was re-signed three days later. He was released again on December 13, 2016, and re-signed to the practice squad. He signed a reserve/future contract with the Bears on January 3, 2017.

On May 1, 2017, Bausby was waived by the Bears.

=== Kansas City Chiefs (second stint) ===
On May 3, 2017, Bausby signed with the Chiefs. Bausby was waived on September 2, 2017.

=== Philadelphia Eagles ===
On September 12, 2017, Bausby was signed to the Philadelphia Eagles' practice squad. With Bausby on the practice squad, the Eagles defeated the New England Patriots in Super Bowl LII. On February 13, 2018, Bausby re-signed with the Eagles.

On September 1, 2018, Bausby was waived by the Eagles and was signed to the practice squad the next day. He was released on September 11, 2018. He was re-signed to the practice squad on November 5, 2018. He was promoted to the active roster on November 17, 2018. On December 24, 2018, he was waived by the Eagles.

=== San Antonio Commanders ===
On January 9, 2019, Bausby signed with the San Antonio Commanders of the Alliance of American Football (AAF). In the season opener against the San Diego Fleet, Bausby picked off quarterback Mike Bercovici in the third quarter. At the time of the league's suspension, Bausby was leading the AAF in pass breakups and interceptions, a number which did not include a highlight 99-yard "pick 2" play that helped seal his team's win in week 7.

=== Denver Broncos (first stint) ===
After the AAF suspended football operations, Bausby signed with the Denver Broncos on April 8, 2019. He earned a spot on the Broncos roster as the fourth cornerback on the depth chart. In week 5 versus the Chargers, Bausby suffered a neck injury that left him immobile for a short period of time after an accidental collision with Alexander Johnson. He was placed on injured reserve on October 8, 2019.

Bausby re-signed with the Broncos on March 19, 2020. He was released on September 5, 2020, but was signed to the practice squad the following day. He was promoted to the active roster on September 16, 2020, and was named the fourth cornerback behind Michael Ojemudia, Bryce Callahan, and Essang Bassey. He was released on October 24 when A. J. Bouye came off injured reserve.

=== Arizona Cardinals ===
On October 30, 2020, Bausby signed with the Arizona Cardinals. After playing one game versus the Miami Dolphins, he was waived by the Cardinals who planned to place him on their practice squad.

=== Denver Broncos (second stint) ===
On November 10, 2020, Bausby was claimed off waivers by the Broncos.

=== Las Vegas Raiders ===
On June 17, 2021, Bausby signed with the Las Vegas Raiders. On August 16, 2021, Bausby was released by the Raiders.

=== New England Patriots ===
On October 27, 2021, Bausby was signed to the New England Patriots practice squad.

=== New Jersey Generals ===
Bausby was selected by the New Jersey Generals of the United States Football League (USFL) with the third pick of the eighth round of the 2022 USFL draft.

=== Washington Commanders ===
Bausby signed with the Washington Commanders on August 4, 2022, but was released on August 16.

=== Arlington Renegades ===
On November 17, 2022, Bausby was drafted by the Arlington Renegades of the XFL. Against the Vegas Vipers in week one, he recorded a pick six with almost four minutes left in the game to put the Renegades up 22–14. That score and the team's eventual stop on the 2-point conversion attempt by Luis Perez propelled them to a 22–20 win. He was not part of the roster after the 2024 UFL dispersal draft on January 15, 2024.
