= Elyse Aehle =

American orchestra conductor

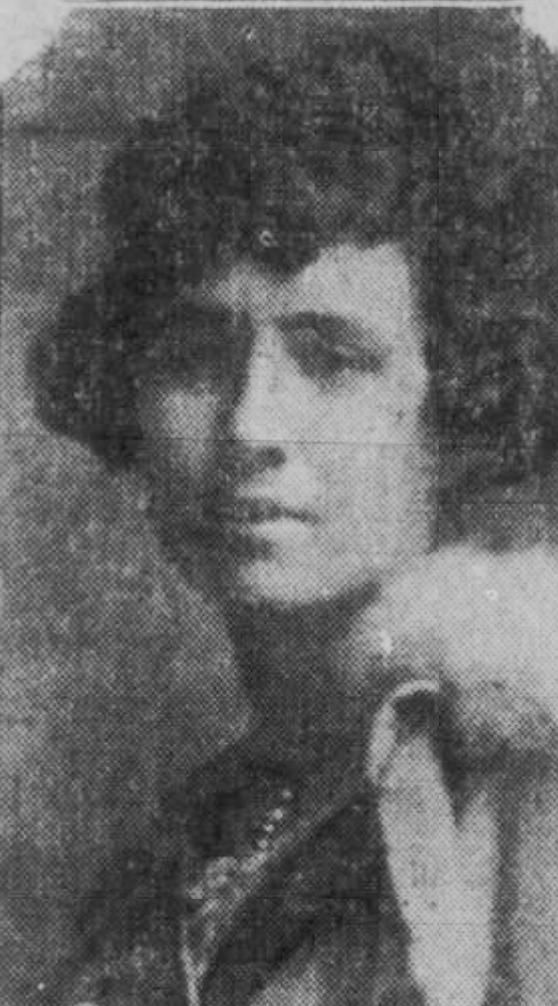
- Elyse Aehle, from a 1922 newspaper
- Born: Elise Rebecca Aehle; November 6, 1894; St. Louis, Missouri, U.S.
- Died: January 5, 1981 (age 86); Los Angeles, California, U.S.
- Other names: Elise Aehle, Elsie Aehle
- Occupations: Violinist, conductor

Elyse Rebecca Aehle (November 6, 1894 – January 5, 1981), also seen as Elise Aehle or Elsie Aehle, was an American violinist and orchestra conductor. She was described as "one of the nation's few woman conductors" in 1946.

== Early life and education ==
Aehle was born in St. Louis, Missouri, the daughter of Charles Speck Aehle and Jennie Lee Carver Aehle. Her father was a jeweler. Both of her parents were musical.

Aehle graduated from Soldan High School, and studied violin with Otakar Ševčík for three years, in Chicago and at his home in Pisek, Czechoslovakia.

== Career ==
=== Early years ===
Aehle entertained American troops in France, as a YMCA musician during World War I. She gave a recital in London in May 1926. Back in Missouri, she gave concerts, was often heard on radio, and was a soloist with the St. Louis Symphony Orchestra. In 1928, she was a member of the all-female touring group, Symphony Espagnole. She taught violin and piano at studios in Missouri and Illinois as a young woman. Rudolph Ganz encouraged her to become a conductor. In 1938 she took up the baton for the Alton Symphony Orchestra in Alton, Illinois.

=== In California ===
Aehle moved to the South Bay of Los Angeles after World War II. She earned a California teaching certificate, organized the South Bay Civic Symphony in 1945, and was its conductor into the 1970s. She also arranged works for the orchestra, organized an annual arts festival, and was appointed to the Los Angeles County Music Commission. She directed musical programs at St. Cross Episcopal Church in Hermosa Beach and American Martyrs Catholic Church in Manhattan Beach. For five years in the 1950s, she was conductor of the San Pedro Symphony. In the 1950s, as president of the Pacific Bowl Association, Aehle promoted the unrealized idea of an outdoor music venue in Palos Verdes, similar to the Hollywood Bowl. She helped to establish the South Coast Botanical Gardens.

== In popular culture ==
Aehle is mentioned in a Tennessee Williams story, "The Resemblance Between a Violin Case and a Coffin" (1939), as "Miss Aehle", the music teacher of two of the characters: "She supported herself and a paralyzed father by giving lessons in violin and piano, neither of which she played very well herself but for which she had great gifts as a teacher," the passage explains. "If not great gifts, at least great enthusiasm."

== Personal life ==
Aehle was injured in a car accident in Illinois in 1944. She lived in Palos Verdes Estates, California with her mother, brother, niece, and her Czech-born sister-in-law, Marie Houska, who had multiple sclerosis, which brought the family to California for her health. She died in 1981, at the age of 86, in Los Angeles.
