= Con Maffie =

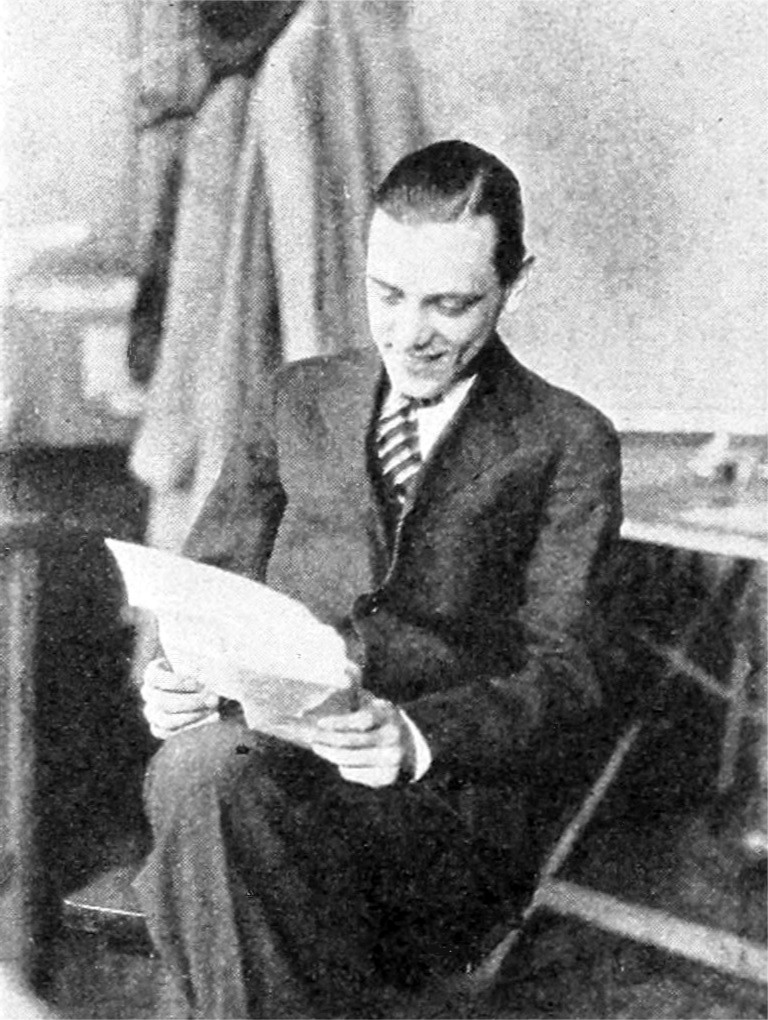
- Maffie, 1931

Background information
- Born: Cornelius Michael Maffie; September 9, 1903; St. Louis, Missouri, United States
- Died: July 22, 1977 (aged 73) La Jolla, California, United States
- Occupation: Organist
- Instruments: Organ; piano
- Spouses: Eleanor; Elaine

Con Maffie (September 9, 1903 – July 22, 1977) was an American organist who was most successful on radio.

== Early life ==
Cornelius Michael Maffie was born on September 9, 1903, in St. Louis, Missouri. His mother and her family were highly musical; she was a harpist, and six of his uncles played in symphony orchestras. His Uncle Antonio Sarli was, for a time, head of music at Warner Brothers. Cornelius began music lessons at the age of five. He studied under Ottmar A. Moll. His secondary education took place at Soldan High School. When he was a teenager, he performed solos with the Boston Symphony, the Minnesota Orchestra, and the St. Louis Symphony. He first studied organ with Charles Henry Galloway, who was considered the "dean of St. Louis organists".

== Career ==
He moved to Chicago and became a pianist for the Chicago Theater, changing his professional name to "Con Maffie". He began playing organ for small theaters on Chicago's south side, from there progressing to Chicago theaters of increasing stature, including the Indiana Harbor, the Admiral Theatre, the Roosevelt Theater, and the Riviera Theatre. He then commenced a tour for Publix Theatres across the midwest and west coast. He next held engagements at the Paramount and Paradise theaters in New York. He then began another tour for Loews Theaters across the East Coast of the United States. In the mid-1930s he was heard over radio station WHN. In 1937 he spent several months as the organist at the Loews Theater in Rochester, New York. It was at this time that Maffie made his first phonograph records.

He moved to California in 1938, bringing his parents with him. His Hammond electric organ was also moved to California, but this had to be shipped from New York by way of the Panama Canal. He began to play organ for various radio shows, which included The Cresta Blanca Hollywood Players, House party, The Life of Riley, Mayor of the Town, Michael Shayne, Private Detective and The Passing Parade. He formed a partnership with pianist Eugene LePique, creating a duo-piano show that also featured vocalists.

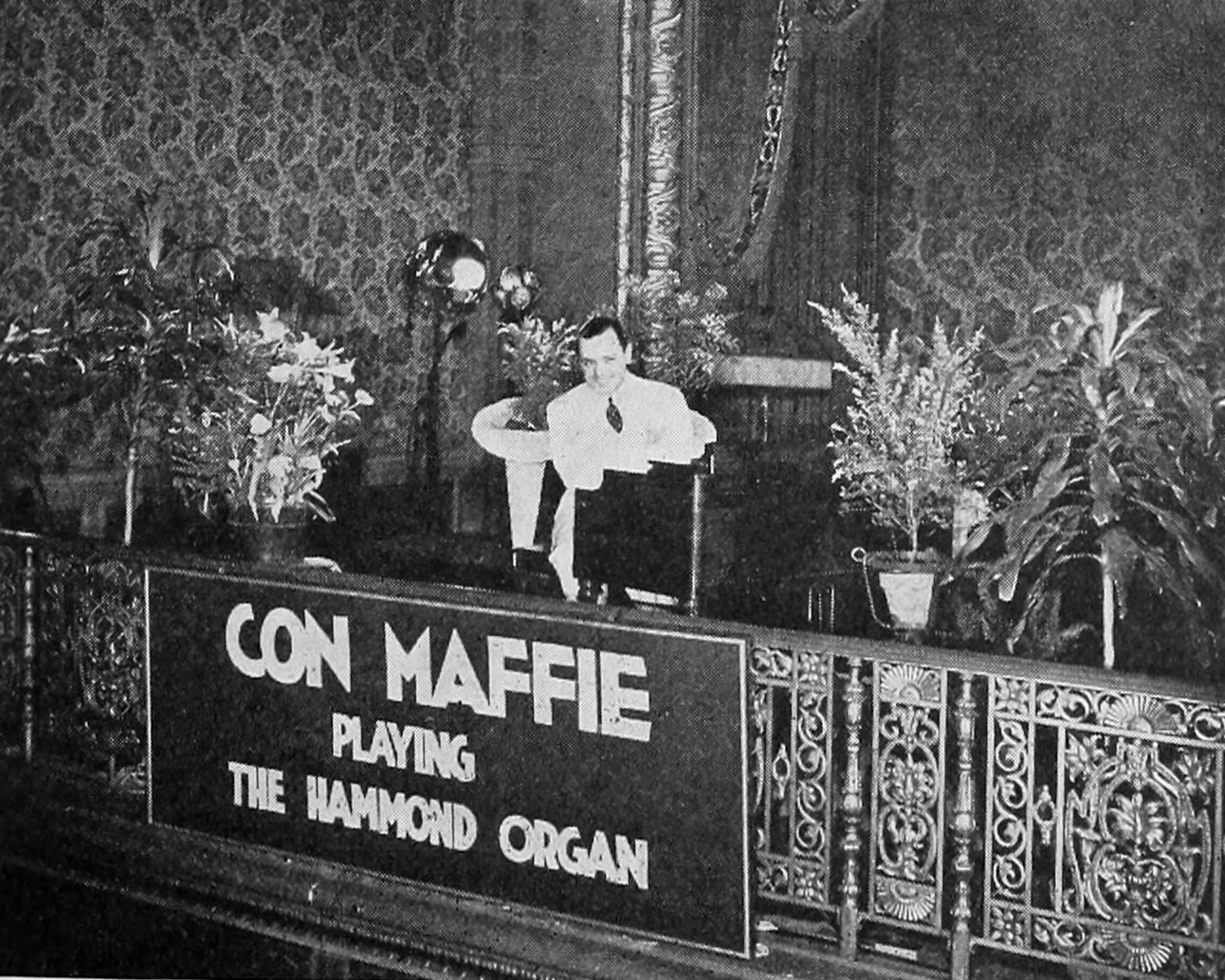
Con Maffie playing a Hammond organ in 1937 to promote the film Maytime

With his mother, who had become a successful real-estate agent in California, he formed a property development company that built apartments in North Hollywood. He met his second wife Elaine while traveling by train from Chicago to Los Angeles on the Chief. They were married in January 1947. When his services were no longer required for the House Party series, he moved to San Diego.

== Retirement ==
Maffie retired as a musician in 1951 to operate a property management company for his family's real estate holdings. After his mother died, he moved to Palm Springs, California, and he was soon asked to be organist for his church there. He then added services for Catholic and Scientist congregations and began an active role in teaching. A friend who owned a music store then asked him to create a radio program with his store as sponsor, so in 1958 he began a radio show over station KCMJ in Palm Springs, which was broadcast from his house on a Hammond organ.

He moved with his family to Phoenix in 1969, stayed for three years, then moved to La Jolla, California. In the 1970s he would spend several months a year in Honolulu giving organ concerts. He suffered his first heart attack in 1974 while at a church conference at the Asilomar Conference Grounds. He died of a heart attack on July 22, 1977.

== Performance style ==
Jesse Crawford considered him "one of the greatest ballad organists". Maffie also composed music, including the theme for House Party.

== Family ==
His first wife was his high school sweetheart, Eleanor. They had one son, Con Jr. He had two sons, Michael and James, with his second wife Elaine.
