= Soldan International Studies High School =

Coordinates: 38.655404°N 90.272282°W

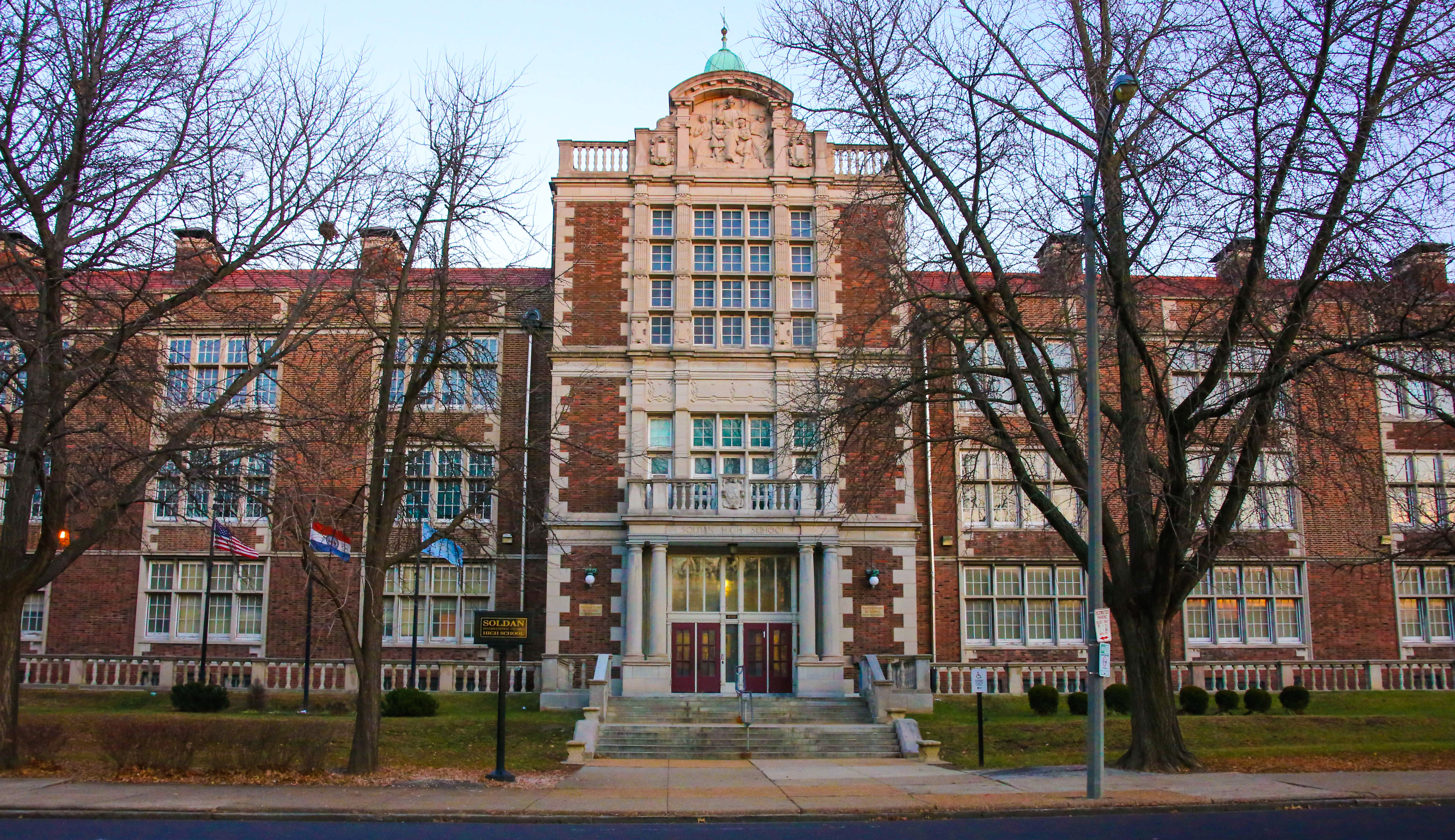
- Front of Soldan International Studies High School, December 2014
- 918 Union Boulevard; St. Louis, Missouri 63107-2003; United States

Information
- Type: Magnet school
- Opened: 1909
- School district: St. Louis Public Schools
- Superintendent: Kelvin Adams
- Principal: Thomas Cason
- Teaching staff: 33.80 (on full-time equivalent (FTE) basis)
- Grades: 9–12
- Enrollment: 395 (2023-2024)
- Student to teacher ratio: 11.69
- Campus type: Urban
- Colors: Maroon and Gold
- Athletics conference: Public High League
- Mascot: Tiger
- Newspaper: Soldan World, formerly Scrippage
- Yearbook: Soldan, formerly Scrip
- Information: (314) 367–9222
- Website: School website

Soldan International Studies High School (also known as Soldan High School) is a public magnet high school in the Academy neighborhood of St. Louis, Missouri, United States, that is part of St. Louis Public Schools. Soldan was known for its wealthy and predominantly Jewish student population, from its opening in 1909. The student population underwent a rapid change in demographics, starting in the 1950s. It was predominantly African American by the mid-1960s. The school was renovated and reopened as a magnet school, with a focus on international relations, in 1993.

== History ==
=== Construction and early years ===
The population of the city had increased to more than 575,000, by the end of the 1890s. The St. Louis Public Schools had operated only one high school since 1855. The school district built two new high schools in 1904, in order to meet the need for greater space for high school students. The district began building a fourth high school, three years later, which became Soldan. The school, known during its construction as Union Avenue High School, was renamed Soldan High School upon opening, in honor of Frank Louis Soldan, the superintendent of St. Louis schools from 1895 until his death in 1908. Land acquisition costs for the building were $10,000, and construction cost $630,000.

William B. Ittner's design for the school received praise from the United States Bureau of Education for its attention to detail and to the needs of students. It was designed to stylistically complement the nearby Clark School, which was designed in Gothic Revival style, with fittings and brickwork to suggest a Tudor period Gothic structure built in approximately 1620. With a capacity of 1,600 students, the building originally occupied an area of 288 by 256 feet and had three stories. The original design of the building had 41 classrooms, with 23 designed for 48 students and 18 for 35 students. The building's 18 science demonstration rooms and laboratories accommodated physiology, physiography, chemistry, botany, and physics, and in the basement, the building was designed with shops for woodworking, machining, and domestic science. The building also had four art rooms with skylights for studio work and three mechanical drafting rooms. The auditorium was the largest in the school system up to that time, with a seating capacity of 1,750, while the music room was built with a capacity of more than 300 students. To provide for ample physical education opportunities, the school was built with two gymnasiums. The school originally had two separate cafeterias for male and female students, although the practice of gender segregation at lunch was ended in the late 1940s.

During the 1930s and 1940s, the school became widely known as the city's "predominantly Jewish" school, with students from several notable or wealthy families in the Central West End. Although the school remained open on Jewish holidays, it often had significantly lower attendance. During its early years, Soldan graduated several notable individuals, including William McChesney Martin, Jr., the longest-serving Chairman of the United States Federal Reserve, and Clark Clifford, a presidential adviser and United States Secretary of Defense. In 1922, Clifford and Martin were tennis doubles partners on the school's team. It also was during the 1920s that Tennessee Williams attended the school; in the 1940s, Soldan received notability as the school attended by some of the characters in Williams' The Glass Menagerie. In 1948, the school received students after the closure of nearby rival Blewett High School, which was located one block from Soldan. After the merger, the school was briefly known as Soldan-Blewett; it returned to its original name in 1955.

=== Integration ===
After the Brown v Board of Education decision in 1954, white parents and students of Soldan were among the most welcoming in the city toward integration. On the first day of integration, the school saw no protests, although national media personalities such as NBC evening news anchor John Cameron Swayze covered the event. Neither black nor white students reported significant incidents of racial tensions or problems, although black students often chose to eat in separate areas of the building from whites in the cafeteria. Despite the relatively uneventful process, Soldan experienced a rapid change in the demographics of its student population. During the 1940s, more than 90 percent of Soldan students were Jewish whites; by the early 1960s, the majority were African American. By 1965, only one white student attended Soldan, and many of the school's African American students had moved into the area from poorer neighborhoods such as Mill Creek Valley after urban renewal projects had displaced them.

=== Renovation and magnet status ===
Starting in the late 1980s, St. Louis schools were required to improve physical conditions and create magnet schools as part of promoting a court-ordered desegregation program. The international studies magnet program originally was set for implementation at Northwest High School, but in August 1988, U.S. District Court Judge Stephen N. Limbaugh revised the district magnet school program. Among the changes was that Soldan would become a magnet school for international studies, and that it would become the highest part of a "cluster" of magnet schools focused on international relations, with lower-level schools having a focus on foreign languages.

Also part of the court desegregation plan was the physical improvement of city schools. Significant renovations to Soldan began in late 1989 and included interior renovations and the replacement of the school's two 2,000-square-foot gymnasiums with one 10,000-square-foot gymnasium. Due to the renovations, the building was closed from the 1990–1991 to the 1992–1993 school years, and its students were reassigned to Roosevelt High School. While the building was undergoing renovations, the city's Center for Management, Law and Public Policy magnet school was folded into the international studies program at Soldan. After three years of construction, the renovated building reopened on September 2, 1993. However, an electrical rewiring of the school and the installation of a synchronized clock system, which were to be completed as part of the renovation work, were not finished until early 1995 owing to a contractual dispute with an electrical company.

After the conversion to a magnet school, Soldan became home to a significant international student population. By 1996, nearly 40 percent of students were from 32 countries other than the United States. As part of the merger of the Center for Management, Law and Public Policy, the school became the only high school in the state to have a law library as part of its facilities. During the 2010–2011 school year, as part of a district budget process, Soldan began to accept seventh and eighth grade students.

== Current status ==
In the 2017-2018 it had an enrollment of 507, making it an average-sized high school in Missouri.

=== Activities ===
Soldan currently offers its students several athletic and academic opportunities, that include: cross country, football, soccer, tennis, softball, and volleyball. For the 2010–2011 school year, the school offered seven activities approved by the Missouri State High School Activities Association (MSHSAA): boys' and girls' cross country, 11-man football, boys' and girls' soccer, girls' tennis, girls' softball, and girls' volleyball. In addition to its current activities, Soldan students have won several state championships, including:

- Boys' Basketball: 1981, 2012
- Boys' Swimming and Diving: 1938, 1941
- Boys' Indoor Track and Field: 1961, 1970
- Ciara Jones - Women's Track and Field: 400m Dash 2001, 2002, 2003 and 2004 200m 2003 and 2004 and 100m Dash 2003 and 2004

Ronnie Pines-Men's Track and Field: 100 meter dash Missouri Class 3 state champion in 2002 and 2003

The school also has produced one tennis doubles state champion and three boys' outdoor track and field individual events champions.

=== Demographics ===
In the 2009–2010 school year, Soldan had an enrollment of 749 students with 53.6 full-time-equivalent teachers, for a student-teacher ratio of 13.97. In 2010, more than 80 percent of students qualified for free or reduced-price lunches. Since 2006, more than 65% of the student population at Soldan has been African American and the white student population has declined by roughly half.

Percent of students by race
Year	Black	White	Hispanic	Asian	Indian
2006	65.7	23.5	5.7	5.1	0.0
2007	68.0	20.9	6.1	4.6	0.0
2008	65.7	21.4	8.3	4.6	0.0
2009	69.0	16.5	9.0	5.2	0.3
2010	76.5	12.1	7.1	3.9	0.4

Students receiving free or reduced price lunch
Year	Percent
2006	83.0
2007	83.3
2008	67.5
2009	69.0
2010	86.3
2023	99

Faculty information by year
Year	Average years experience	Percent with master's degree
2006	14.6	64.2
2007	15.5	64.6
2008	8.9	54.9
2009	7.3	58.1
2010	6.8	48.5

=== Academic and discipline issues ===
Soldan has a low dropout rate; for the 2009–2010 school year, 1.8 percent of students dropped out compared to the Missouri state dropout rate of 3.5 percent. Soldan also has a discipline incident rate of 3.1 percent, which is comparable to the average Missouri rate. Since the passage of No Child Left Behind in 2001, Soldan has met the requirements for adequate yearly progress (AYP) twice. In 2006, Soldan students achieved 17.2 percent proficiency in communication arts, allowing the school to meet AYP via making satisfactory progress. In 2009, the school met AYP in communication arts via a confidence interval.

Graduation rates by year
Year	Graduates	Cohort dropouts‡	Graduation rate†
2006	169	55	75.4
2007	116	37	75.8
2008	146	64	69.5
2009	138	55	71.5
2010	151	23	86.8
‡ Cohort dropouts is the number of students from the grade level graduating for that year who dropped out. † Graduation rate is calculated as number of graduates divided by number of graduates plus dropouts, multiplied by 100.

== Notable people ==
=== Alumni ===
- Elyse Aehle (1912), violinist and conductor
- Fontella Bass (1958), singer
- Jerry Berger, columnist and press agent
- Gerald Boyd, managing editor and metropolitan editor of the New York Times
- Clark Clifford, presidential adviser and United States Secretary of Defense from 1968 to 1969
- Willis Crenshaw, NFL player
- Georgia Frontiere, owner of the St. Louis Rams, an NFL team
- Louis A. Gottschalk, psychiatrist
- Thomas M. Graber, orthodontist
- Lee Handley, MLB player
- Emily Hahn, author
- Edmund Hartmann, film and television writer and producer
- Johnny Haymer, actor
- Thomas C. Hennings Jr. (1920), United States Senator and United States Representative from Missouri
- Ronald Himes, theatre producer, director and actor
- Erin Marie Hogan, actress
- A.E. Hotchner, author and co-founder of the Newman's Own food company
- Larron Jackson, NFL player
- Raynard Jackson, Republican Party consultant
- Stan Kann, vacuum cleaner collector and organist
- Harold Koplar, hotelier
- Melvin Kranzberg, historian and co-founder of the Society for the History of Technology
- Con Maffie, theater and radio organist.
- William McChesney Martin, longest-serving Chairman of the United States Federal Reserve
- Virginia Mayo, actress
- Paul McRoberts, NFL player
- Agnes Moorehead, Hollywood actress Co-star "Bewitched" TV Show
- Greg Osby, jazz saxophonist
- Ken Rothman, Lieutenant Governor of Missouri from 1981 to 1985
- Muddy Ruel, former MLB player (St. Louis Browns, New York Yankees, Boston Red Sox, Washington Senators, Detroit Tigers, Chicago White Sox) and manager (Saint Louis Browns)
- Jackson V. Scholz, graduated 1915, Olympic sprinter (1920/24/28), prolific author of sports fiction, portrayed in Chariots of Fire (1981)
- Guy Stern (1922–2023), author, director of the Holocaust Memorial Center, and member of the Ritchie Boys
- Julian A. Steyermark, botanist
- Charles Richard Stith, United States Ambassador to Tanzania from 1998 to 2001
- David Thirdkill, NBA basketball player; 1993 Israeli Basketball Premier League MVP
- Kay Thompson, author and actress
- Marko Todorovich, basketball player
- Joe Torry, comedian and actor

=== Faculty ===
- Justin Tatum, Championship winning basketball coach (Illawarra Hawks, 2024–25)
- Leah Rachel Yoffie, folklorist and poet

=== Others ===
- Tennessee Williams, playwright, attended for one year prior to transfer to University City High School
