= Justin Tatum =

American basketball player and coach (born 1979)

Illawarra Hawks
- Title: Head coach
- League: NBL

Personal information
- Born: March 10, 1979 (age 47) (Note: Some sources list him as being born on March 10, while others state he was born on April 11.) St. Louis, Missouri, U.S.
- Listed height: 6 ft 7 in (2.01 m)
- Listed weight: 235 lb (107 kg)

Career information
- High school: Cardinal Ritter College Prep (St. Louis, Missouri); Christian Brothers College (St. Louis, Missouri)
- College: Saint Louis (1998–2001); McKendree (2002–2003)
- NBA draft: 2003: undrafted
- Playing career: 2003–2005
- Position: Forward / center
- Coaching career: 2006–present

Career history

Playing
- 2003–2005: Aris Leeuwarden
- 2004: St. Louis SkyHawks

Coaching
- 2006–2007: Christian Brothers College HS (assistant)
- 2007–2013: Soldan HS
- 2013–2023: Christian Brothers College HS
- 2022–2023: St. Louis Surge (assistant)
- 2023: Illawarra Hawks (assistant)
- 2023–present: Illawarra Hawks
- 2025: Pelita Jaya

Career highlights
- As player: Promotiedivisie champion (2004); DBL All-Star (2005); As coach: NBL champion (2025); NBL Coach of the Year (2025)

Justin Tatum (born March 10, 1979) is an American professional basketball coach and former player who is the head coach for the Illawarra Hawks of the Australian National Basketball League (NBL). He played college basketball for the Saint Louis Billikens between 1998 and 2001 before having a two-year playing career in the Netherlands with Aris Leeuwarden between 2003 and 2005. Between 2007 and 2023, he had a 16-year high school coaching career in Missouri, winning three state championships. He moved to Australia in 2023 where he became head coach of the Illawarra Hawks. In just his second season as Hawks coach, he led the team to the 2025 NBL championship.

== Early life ==
Tatum was born and raised in St. Louis, Missouri. He grew up with his mother, Rose Mary Johnson, and his younger sister, Kristen. He saw his father occasionally. His mother was an elementary school teacher and worked extra jobs to provide for her children.

Tatum grew up playing football, baseball and track and field. He did not start playing basketball until eighth grade. After spending his freshman year at Cardinal Ritter College Prep High School, he moved to Christian Brothers College High School, where he won a Missouri state title with future NBA player Larry Hughes as a senior in 1997.

== College career ==
Tatum attempted to join the Saint Louis Billikens of the Conference USA for the 1997–98 season, but the National Collegiate Athletic Association (NCAA) ruled him ineligible for academic reasons. He failed to score high enough on the ACT and was subsequently diagnosed by a psychologist with a disorder that involved severe anxiety while taking tests. He was allowed to take the test untimed and registered a score high enough to qualify. However, the NCAA rejected the untimed score. He failed to become eligible for the spring semester, and because he hadn't enrolled as a full-time student until the second semester, he was ruled ineligible for the first semester of the 1998–99 season as well. He contemplated transferring but did not want to play for a Division II school. He subsequently did not play competitive basketball for a year and a half.

Tatum debuted for the Billikens in December 1998. His diminished conditioning limited him to a reserve role for the 1998–99 season. In 22 games, he averaged 7.2 points, 4.5 rebounds and 1.2 blocks in 19.5 minutes per game. In the 1999–2000 season, Tatum averaged 8.3 points, 6.0 rebounds and 1.1 assists in 24.5 minutes in 32 games, including 16 starts. He was the second-leading scorer for the Billikens' Conference USA championship team in 2000. In the 2000–01 season, he averaged 8.9 points and 5.1 rebounds in 23.2 minutes in 31 games over 12 starts. Tatum graduated from SLU in 2001.

By completing his degree, Tatum earned back the season of eligibility that he had lost as a freshman but he missed the 2001–02 season because of a knee injury. His NCAA eligibility subsequently expired and he had to join a National Association of Intercollegiate Athletics (NAIA) program to complete his collegiate career. Tatum joined McKendree University after becoming eligible in the second semester of the 2002–03 season. He helped the Bearcats finish with a 34–4 record and reach the NAIA Final Four. In 16 games, he made 15 starts and averaged 13.4 points and 9.9 rebounds in 23.4 minutes per game.

== Professional career ==
Tatum made his professional debut with Aris Leeuwarden in the Dutch Promotiedivisie in the 2003–04 season. He helped the team win the Promotiedivisie championship, which earned them promotion to the first-tiered Dutch Basketball League (DBL).

In 2004, Tatum played for the St. Louis SkyHawks in the United States Basketball League (USBL). In nine games, he averaged 13.3 points, 8.3 rebounds and 1.4 assists per game.

Tatum returned to Aris for the 2004–05 DBL season. He played in the DBL All-Star Game and averaged 15.9 points, 11.9 rebounds, 2.9 assists, 2.1 steals and 1.8 blocks in 31 games.

Being away from his family for many months at a time took its toll on Tatum. He subsequently retired from playing professional basketball overseas to be with his son.

== Coaching career ==
=== High school ===
Tatum's first coaching stint came in the 2006–07 season as an assistant coach with his alma mater, Christian Brothers College High School.

In 2007, Tatum was appointed head coach of the Soldan High School boys' basketball team. In 2012, he guided Soldan to the Class 4 state title.

In 2013, Tatum returned to Christian Brothers College High School, this time as head coach of the boys' basketball team. In his first season as coach, he guided the Cadets to their first state championship since 1997. He guided the Cadets to the state championship again in 2022. He left the program following the 2022–23 season as one of the most successful prep coaches in Missouri history.

=== St. Louis Surge ===
In 2022 and 2023, Tatum served as associate head coach of the St. Louis Surge of the Global Women's Basketball Association (GWBA).

=== Illawarra Hawks and Pelita Jaya ===
In February 2023, Tatum joined the Illawarra Hawks of the Australian National Basketball League (NBL) as its North American scout and special advisor to basketball operations.

In May 2023, Tatum was appointed an assistant coach of the Illawarra Hawks for the 2023–24 NBL season. On November 14, 2023, he was promoted to interim head coach when Jacob Jackomas was fired after the Hawks started the season with a 2–7 record. Tatum guided the Hawks to seven victories in his first nine games as coach, going on to lead them to a fourth-place finish and a 14–14 record. He subsequently finished as runner-up for NBL Coach of the Year. On February 22, 2024, prior to the Hawks' playoff campaign, Tatum signed a three-year deal with Illawarra to continue as permanent head coach. He helped the Hawks reach the semi-finals with a victory in the play-in game against the New Zealand Breakers. They went on to lose 2–1 to Melbourne United in the semi-finals.

Tatum entered the 2024–25 NBL season with the belief that the Hawks were a top-two team. The team started the season with a 6–2 record before going on to finish on top of the ladder with a 20–9 record. It marked the Hawks' first ever top-of-the-ladder finish in the club's 46-year history Tatum was subsequently named NBL Coach of the Year. He guided the Hawks to a 2–1 semi-finals series victory over the South East Melbourne Phoenix to advance to the NBL Grand Final. In the grand final series, he guided the Hawks to the NBL championship with a 3–2 victory over Melbourne United. It marked the Hawks' second championship in franchise history.

On April 24, 2025, Tatum was appointed head coach of Pelita Jaya of the Indonesian Basketball League (IBL) for the rest of the 2025 season.

In the 2025–26 NBL season, the Hawks missed the finals with a 13–20 record.

== Personal life ==
Tatum has a sister and four half-siblings. He is a cousin of former NBA player and current coach Tyronn Lue.

Tatum is the father of NBA player Jayson Tatum, born in 1998 to Brandy Cole. Brandy raised Jayson as a single mother. Tatum was heavily involved with Jayson's life while he was playing at Saint Louis, and when he was playing in the Netherlands, Brandy took Jayson overseas to visit his father.

Tatum's childhood friend, former NBA player Larry Hughes, is Jayson's godfather. Tatum's other two children are son Jaycob and daughter Kayden.
