= Sacred Heart High School (Missouri) =

Location
- 416 West 3rd Street; Sedalia, (Pettis County), Missouri 65301; United States; 38°42′33″N 93°13′56″W

Information
- Type: Private, Coeducational
- Religious affiliation: Roman Catholic
- Established: 1882
- Superintendent: Rev. Mark Miller
- Administrator: Dr. Mark Register
- Grades: K–12
- Colors: Red and White
- Athletics conference: Kaysinger
- Mascot: Gremlins
- Athletic Director: David Fall
- Website: http://www.gogremlins.com

Sacred Heart School is a private elementary and secondary school in Sedalia, Missouri, providing education for grades Kindergarten through 12th grade. It is a Roman Catholic school, affiliated with the Sacred Heart Church Parish in the Roman Catholic Diocese of Jefferson City.

== Background ==
The school was founded in 1882 by the local pastor and staffed by the Sisters of the Precious Blood, with an enrollment of approximately 400 students. Student to teacher ratios range from 13.4 to 1 in the secondary school to 20 to 1 in the elementary grades.

The school mascot is the Gremlin, with team colors of red and white.

== Athletics ==
Sacred Heart won the State Championship in 2014 in Boys' Basketball. They have also won 2 State Championships in Volleyball and 3 in Boys' Golf. In 2006, they also won the State Championship in Baseball. They are a part of the Kaysinger Conference.
