= Farmington Senior High School (Missouri) =

Public high school in Missouri, US

Location
- 1 Black Knight Drive; Farmington, Missouri 63640; United States; 37.7789°N 90.4369°W

Information
- Type: Public comprehensive high school
- School district: Farmington School District
- NCES School ID: 291191000440
- Principal: Jamie LaMonds
- Teaching staff: 86.42 (FTE)
- Enrollment: 1,354 (2024–2025)
- Student to teacher ratio: 15.67
- Colors: Black and gold
- Mascot: Black Knight
- Team name: Knights
- Website: fsdknights.com

Farmington Senior High School is a public comprehensive high school in Farmington, Missouri that is part of the Farmington School District.

As of 2019-2020 the student body is 93% white, 3% African-American, 2% Hispanic and 1% Asian.

== Notable alumni ==
- Kyle Richardson: National Football League player

== Faculty ==
- Barney Pelty, baseball coach; Major League Baseball pitcher.

== Publications ==
The school has two publications, an online newspaper called Knight Life and a yearbook called Knights in Review.
