= 2012 Missouri elections =

Missouri elections, 2012
- November 6, 2012

The 2012 Missouri elections took place on November 6, 2012.

== Presidential ==
2012 United States presidential election in Missouri
Party	Candidate	Running mate	Votes	Percentage	Electoral votes
Republican	Mitt Romney	Paul Ryan	1,482,440	53.76%	10
Democratic	Barack Obama	Joe Biden	1,223,796	44.38%	0
Libertarian	Gary Johnson	Jim Gray	43,151	1.57%	0
Constitution	Virgil Goode	Jim Clymer	7,936	0.29%	0
Totals			2,757,323	100.00%	10

== United States Senate ==
Incumbent Claire McCaskill won by a considerably large margin even as Barack Obama lost the state to Mitt Romney.

United States Senate election in Missouri, 2012
Party	Candidate	Votes	%	±%
Democratic	Claire McCaskill (incumbent)	1,494,125	54.81%	+5.36%
Republican	Todd Akin	1,066,159	39.11%	−8.20%
Libertarian	Jonathan Dine	165,468	6.07%	+3.83%
Write-in		41	0.01%	+0.01%
Total votes		2,725,793	100.00%	N/A
Democratic hold				

== United States House of Representatives ==
United States House of Representatives elections in Missouri, 2012
Party	Votes	Percentage	Seats before	Seats after	+/–
Republican	1,463,586	54.70%	6	6	-
Democratic	1,119,554	41.84%	3	2	-1
Libertarian	87,774	3.28%	0	0	-
Constitution	4,971	0.19%	0	0	-
Independent	15	<0.01%	0	0	-
Total	2,675,900	100.00%	9	8	—

== Governor ==
Even as Barack Obama lost the state to Mitt Romney, incumbent governor Jay Nixon won re-election by 10 points

Missouri gubernatorial election, 2012
Party	Candidate	Votes	%	±%
Democratic	Jay Nixon (incumbent)	1,494,056	54.77%	−3.63%
Republican	Dave Spence	1,160,265	42.53%	+3.04%
Libertarian	Jim Higgins	73,509	2.70%	+1.59%
Write-in		53	0.00%	0.00%
Total votes		2,727,883	100.00%	N/A
Democratic hold				

== Lieutenant governor ==
2012 Missouri lieutenant gubernatorial clection
Party	Candidate	Votes	%
Republican	Peter Kinder (incumbent)	1,316,653	49.4
Democratic	Susan Montee	1,211,353	45.4
Libertarian	Matthew Copple	75,169	2.8
Constitution	Cynthia Davis	63,594	2.3
Total votes		2,678,313	100.0
Republican hold			

== Secretary of State ==
2012 Missouri Secretary of State election
Party	Candidate	Votes	%
Democratic	Jason Kander	1,298,022	48.9%
Republican	Shane Schoeller	1,258,937	47.4%
Libertarian	Cisse W. Spragins	70,814	2.7%
Constitution	Justin Harter	27,710	1.0%
Total votes		2,655,483	100.0%
Democratic hold			

== State Treasurer ==
2012 Missouri State Treasurer election
Party	Candidate	Votes	%
Democratic	Clint Zweifel (incumbent)	1,332,876	50.4
Republican	Cole McNary	1,200,368	45.4
Libertarian	Sean O'Toole	109,188	4.1
Total votes		2,642,432	100.0
Democratic hold			

== Attorney general ==
2012 Missouri Attorney General election
Party	Candidate	Votes	%	±%
Democratic	Chris Koster (incumbent)	1,482,381	55.81%	+2.98
Republican	Ed Martin	1,081,510	40.71%	−6.46
Libertarian	Dave Browning	92,465	3.48%	N/A
Total votes		2,668,064	100.00%	N/A
Democratic hold				
