= Judy Baker =

American politician

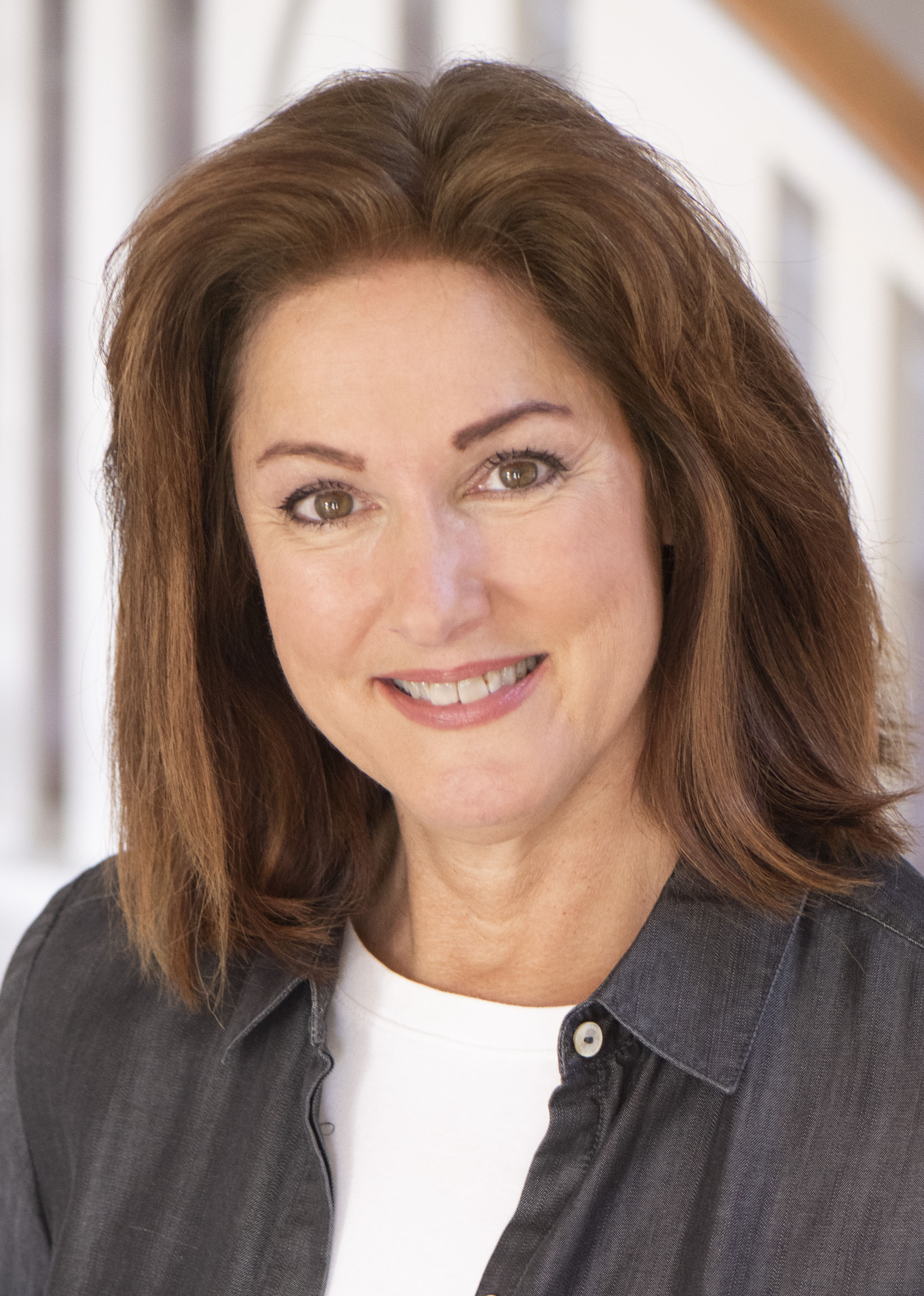

Member of the Missouri House of Representatives from the 25th district
- In office January 5, 2005 – January 7, 2009
- Preceded by: Vicky Riback-Wilson
- Succeeded by: Mary Still

Personal details
- Born: April 10, 1960 (age 66) Columbia, Missouri, U.S.
- Party: Democratic
- Spouse: John D. Baker
- Children: 3
- Education: University of Missouri (BS)(MA); Southern Baptist Theological Seminary (MA)
- Occupation: Professor, Health Care Administration

Judith W. Baker (born April 10, 1960) is an American Democratic politician, small business owner, and educator from Missouri. She is a former member of the Missouri House of Representatives and a former Region VII Director for the United States Department of Health and Human Services. Baker was a candidate for Missouri State Treasurer in the 2016 election, but was defeated in the general election by Eric Schmitt.

Baker ran for the Missouri Senate in the 2020 general election for Missouri's 19th Senate District. She lost to incumbent Caleb Rowden.

== Early life and education ==
Judy Baker was born in Columbia, Missouri to elementary school teacher Beverly (Briggs) Wall and physician Norman Wall. Her father was a military doctor, which prompted several moves for the family during her youth. Baker graduated in 1978 from Western Branch High School in Chesapeake, Virginia. She went on to obtain a B.S. in Educational Psychology from University of Missouri in 1981, a M.A. in Divinity from Southern Baptist Theological Seminary in 1986, and a M.A. in Health Administration from the University of Missouri in 2002. Prior to entering politics Baker worked a variety of jobs in the healthcare management field until starting her own consulting firm, Cura Advantage. Baker has been an adjunct professor at Columbia College, the University of Missouri, Washington University in St. Louis, and New York University.

== Personal life ==
She resides in Columbia with her husband, John Baker, a Baptist minister, and three children.

== Politics ==
Judy Baker was first elected to the Missouri House in November 2004, defeating Republican Robert (Bob) Northrup. She ran unopposed in 2006 to earn her second term. While in the Missouri House she founded the bi-partisan "Healthy Missourians" caucus, a group who advocated preventative medicine and responsible approaches to Missouri healthcare.

In 2008 Baker aspired to higher office, running for U.S. Congress in Missouri's 9th Congressional District to replace Kenny Hulshof. After beating three fellow Democrats in the August primary Baker lost a close November general election to Republican and fellow State Representative Blaine Luetkemeyer. Following the defeat Baker returned to the private sector and teaching at Columbia College until November, 2009 when she was appointed the regional HHS director by Health & Human Services Secretary Kathleen Sebelius. Baker would hold that position for just over two years until resigning in early December, 2011.

Baker was one of eight Democratic candidates for Missouri Lieutenant Governor in 2012. She came in second to former Missouri State Auditor Susan Montee, who was defeated in the general election by Republican incumbent Peter Kinder.

In the 2016 election cycle, Baker filed as a candidate for Missouri State Treasurer. Her only opponent for the Democratic nomination was Patrick Contreras, of Kansas City, whom she defeated 59% to 41%. She went on to face term-limited Republican State Senator Eric Schmitt of suburban St. Louis, as well as two third-party candidates and a write-in candidate, in the November general election. Schmitt won with 56.65% of the vote, to Baker's 39.15%.

In the 2020 election cycle, Baker was the sole Democratic candidate for the Missouri Senate, District 19, taking on incumbent Caleb Rowden, who was unopposed in the Republican primary. She lost 48.33% to 51.60%.

== Electoral history ==
=== State representative ===
Missouri House of Representatives Democratic Primary Election, August 3, 2004, District 25
Party	Candidate	Votes	%	±%
Democratic	Judy Baker	1,808	41.49%	
Democratic	Mike Blum	850	19.50%	
Democratic	Lara Underwood	839	19.25%	
Democratic	Russel P. Breyfogle, Jr.	552	12.67%	
Democratic	Duane D. Dimmitt	309	7.09%	
Total votes		4,358	100	

Missouri House of Representatives Election, November 2, 2004, District 25
Party	Candidate	Votes	%	±%
Democratic	Judy Baker	10,811	66.16%	+11.89
Republican	Robert L. Northrup	5,529	33.84%	−8.44
Total votes		16,340	100	

Missouri House of Representatives Election, November 7, 2006, District 25
Party	Candidate	Votes	%	±%
Democratic	Judy Baker	8,671	100.00%	+33.84%
Total votes		8,671	100	

=== United States Representative ===
United States House of Representatives Primary Election, August 5, 2008, 9th Congressional District
Party	Candidate	Votes	%	±%
Democratic	Judy Baker	22,498	44.12%	
Democratic	Steve Gaw	15,864	31.11%	
Democratic	Lyndon Bode	6,565	12.88%	
Democratic	Ken Jacob	6,060	11.89%	
Total votes		50,987	100	

United States House of Representatives Election, November 4, 2008, 9th Congressional District
Party	Candidate	Votes	%	±%
Democratic	Judy Baker	152,956	47.49%	+11.53
Republican	Blaine Luetkemeyer	161,031	49.99%	−11.46
Libertarian	Tamara Millay	8,108	2.52%	+0.90
Total votes		322,095	100	

=== Lieutenant governor ===
Missouri Lieutenant Governor Primary Election, August 7, 2012
Party	Candidate	Votes	%	±%
Democratic	Susan Montee	131,319	44.93%	
Democratic	Judy Baker	46,236	15.82%	
Democratic	Bill Haas	35,044	11.99%	
Democratic	Sara Lampe	25,955	8.88%	
Democratic	Dennis Weisenberger	16,149	5.53%	
Democratic	Jackie Townes McGee	15,493	5.30%	
Democratic	Becky Lee Plattner	11,080	3.79%	
Democratic	Fred Kratky	10,976	3.76%	
Total votes		292,252	100	

=== Treasurer ===
Missouri Treasurer Primary Election, August 2, 2016
Party	Candidate	Votes	%	±%
Democratic	Judy Baker	182,218	59.25%	
Democratic	Pat Contreras	125,338	40.75%	
Total votes		307,556	100	

Missouri Treasurer Election, November 8, 2016
Party	Candidate	Votes	%	±%
Democratic	Judy Baker	1,078,063	39.37%	−11.07
Republican	Eric Schmitt	1,545,582	56.45%	+11.02
Libertarian	Sean O'Toole	78,543	2.87%	−1.16
Green	Carol Hexem	35,923	1.31%	+1.31
Total votes		2,738,122	100	

=== State Senate ===
Missouri Senate Election, November 3, 2020, District 19
Party	Candidate	Votes	%	±%
Democratic	Judy Baker	47,367	48.33%	−0.45
Republican	Caleb Rowden	50,570	51.60%	+0.38
Write-In	James Coyne	72	0.07%	+0.07
Total votes		98,009	100	

Party political offices
Preceded by Clint Zweifel	Democratic nominee for State Treasurer of Missouri; 2016	Succeeded by Vicki Englund
