= 2016 Missouri State Treasurer election =

- November 8, 2016
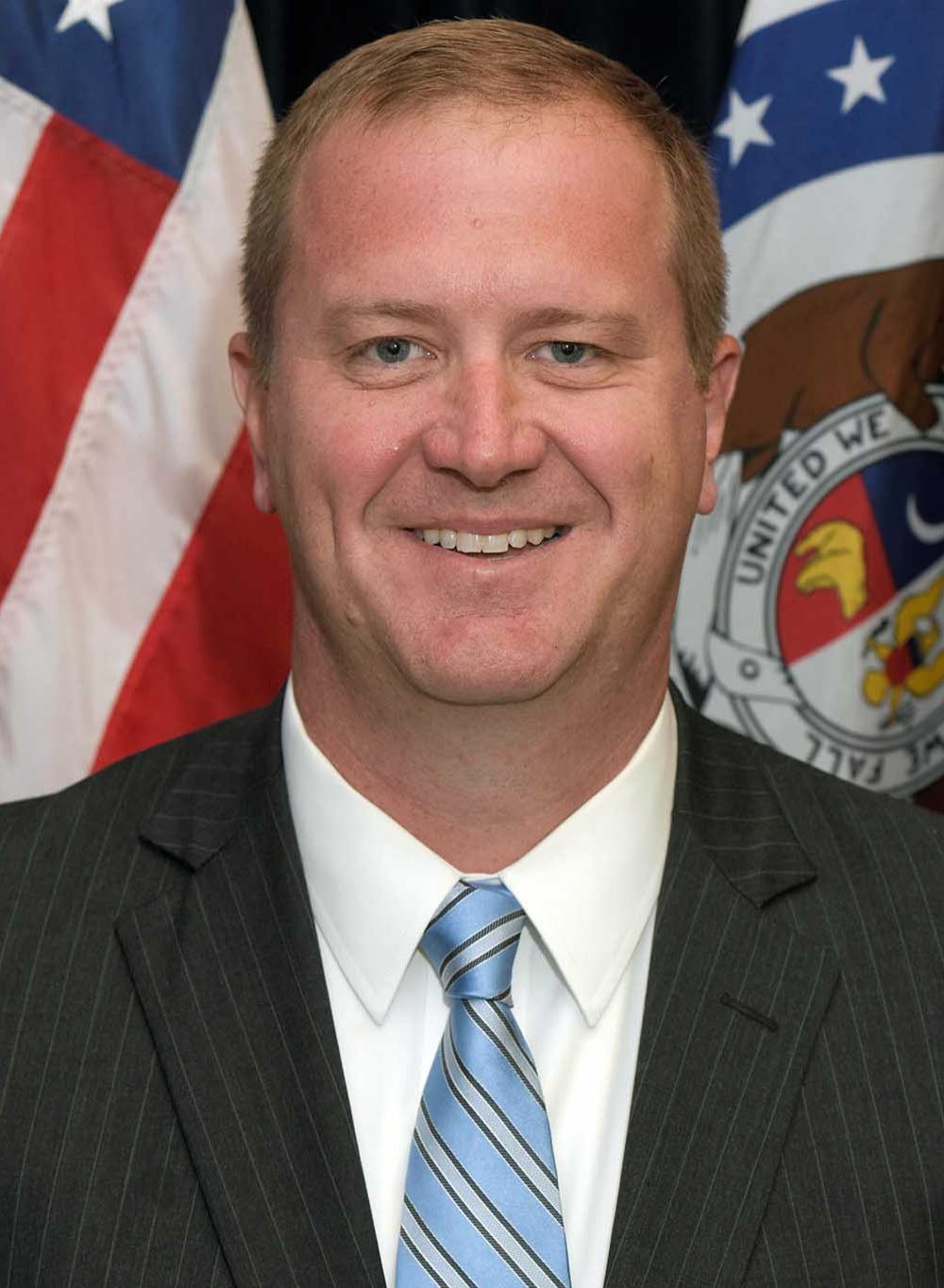

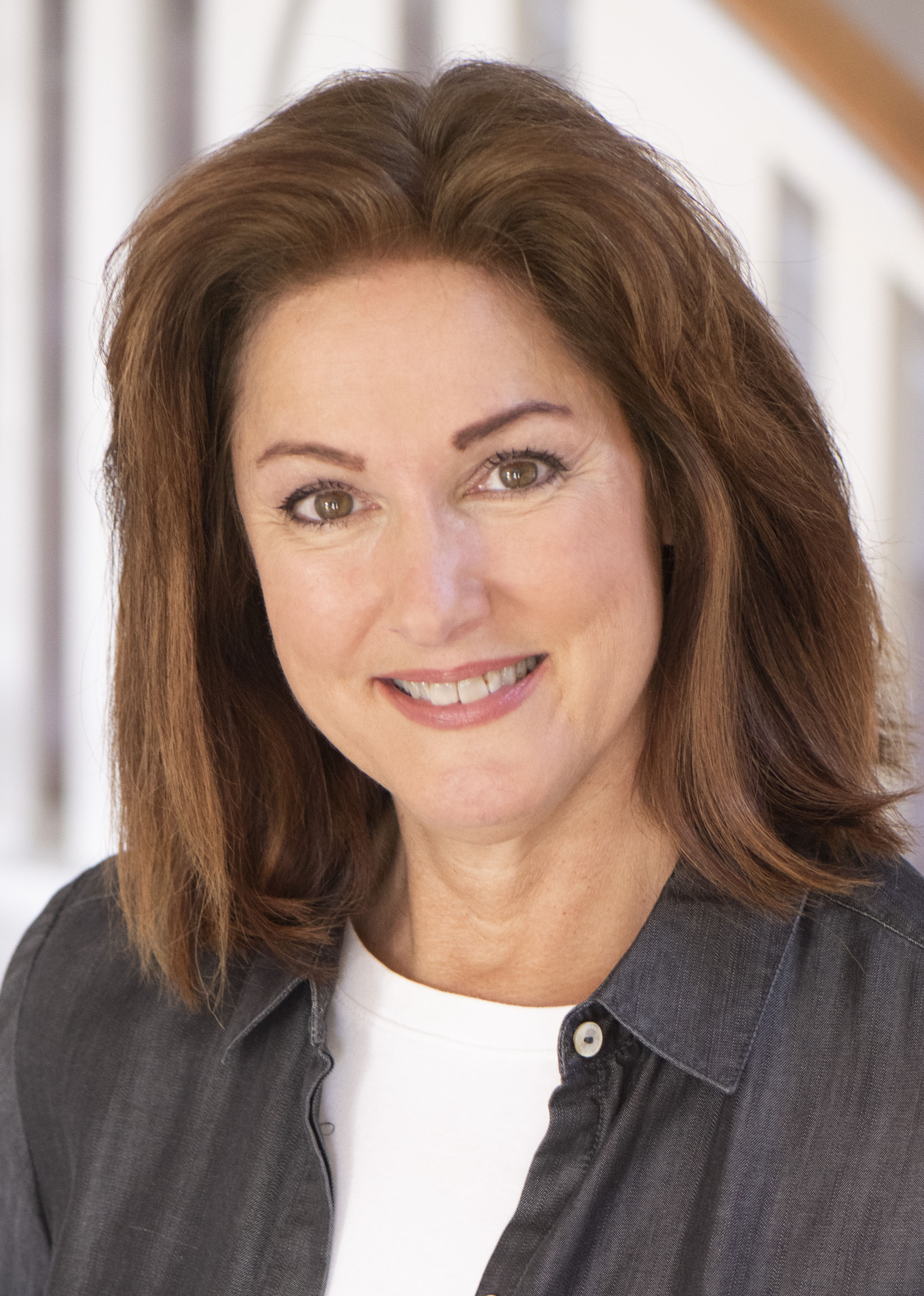
Nominee	Eric Schmitt	Judy Baker
Party	Republican	Democratic
Popular vote	1,545,582	1,078,063
Percentage	56.48%	39.37%
- Schmitt: 40–50% 50–60% 60–70% 70–80% 80–90% >90% Baker: 40–50% 50–60% 60–70% 70–80% 80–90% >90% Tie: 40–50% 50% No votes
State Treasurer before election
Clint Zweifel
Democratic
Elected State Treasurer
Eric Schmitt
Republican

The 2016 Missouri State Treasurer election was held on November 8, 2016, to elect the state treasurer of Missouri, concurrently with the 2016 U.S. presidential election, as well as elections to the United States Senate, elections to the United States House of Representatives, and various state and local elections.

Incumbent Democratic State Treasurer Clint Zweifel was term-limited and could not run for re-election to a third term in office. Eric Schmitt (Republican) won the general election against his opponents Sean O'Toole (Libertarian), Judy Baker (Democrat), and Carol Hexem (Green).

== Democratic primary ==
=== Candidates ===
==== Declared ====
- Judy Baker, former state representative, nominee for MO-09 in 2008 and candidate for lieutenant governor in 2012
- Pat Contreras, business consultant and former diplomat

==== Declined ====
- Mike Sanders, Jackson County Executive, former Jackson County prosecuting attorney and former chairman of the Missouri Democratic Party
- John Wright, former state representative

=== Endorsements ===
Judy Baker

Newspapers

- The Kansas City Star
Pat Contreras

Individuals

- Sly James, mayor of Kansas City

Newspapers

- St. Louis Post-Dispatch

=== Polling ===
Poll source	Date(s) administered	Sample size	Margin of error	Judy Baker	Pat Contreras	Undecided
Remington Research	September 18–19, 2015	1,589	± 2.4%	28%	15%	58%

=== Results ===
Democratic primary results
Party	Candidate	Votes	%
Democratic	Judy Baker	182,218	59.2
Democratic	Pat Contreras	125,338	40.8
Total votes		307,556	100.0

== Republican primary ==
=== Candidates ===
==== Declared ====
- Eric Schmitt, state senator

==== Withdrawn ====
- Dan W. Brown, state senator
Eric Schmitt

Organizations

- IAFF Local 42 Greater Kansas City Firefighters
- Missouri Fraternal Order of Police
- Missouri State Council of Fire Fighters
- St. Louis City Police Officers Association
- St. Louis County Police Association

Individuals

- Treasurer Wendell Bailey
- Senator Roy Blunt
- Treasurer Sarah Steelman

=== Results ===
Republican primary results
Party	Candidate	Votes	%
Republican	Eric Schmitt	563,047	100.0
Total votes		563,047	100.0

== Libertarian primary ==
=== Candidates ===
==== Declared ====
- Sean O'Toole

=== Results ===
Libertarian primary results
Party	Candidate	Votes	%
Libertarian	Sean O'Toole	3,483	100.0
Total votes		3,483	100.0

== Green Party ==
=== Candidates ===
==== Declared ====
- Carol Hexem, businesswoman and former schoolteacher

== General election ==
=== Polling ===
Poll source	Date(s) administered	Sample size	Margin of error	Judy Baker (D)	Eric Schmitt (R)	Undecided
Gravis Marketing	September 11–13, 2016	604	± 4.0%	37%	48%	15%
Remington Research Group	September 1–2, 2016	1,275	± 3.0%	36%	45%	11%
Remington Research Group	August 5–6, 2016	1,280	± 3%	40%	43%	11%

=== Endorsements ===
Judy Baker (D)

Individuals

- Clint Zweifel, incumbent Missouri treasurer
Eric Schmitt (R)

Individuals

- Roy Blunt, U.S. senator

=== Results ===
2016 Missouri state treasurer election
Party	Candidate	Votes	%	±%
Republican	Eric Schmitt	1,545,582	56.45%	+11.02%
Democratic	Judy Baker	1,078,063	39.37%	−11.07%
Libertarian	Sean O'Toole	78,543	2.87%	−1.26%
Green	Carol Hexem	35,923	1.31%	N/A
Independent	Arnie C. AC Dienoff (write-in)	11	0.00%	N/A
Total votes		2,738,122	100.0%	N/A
Republican gain from Democratic				

== See also ==
- 2016 Missouri gubernatorial election
