= Eric Schmitt =

American lawyer and politician (born 1975)

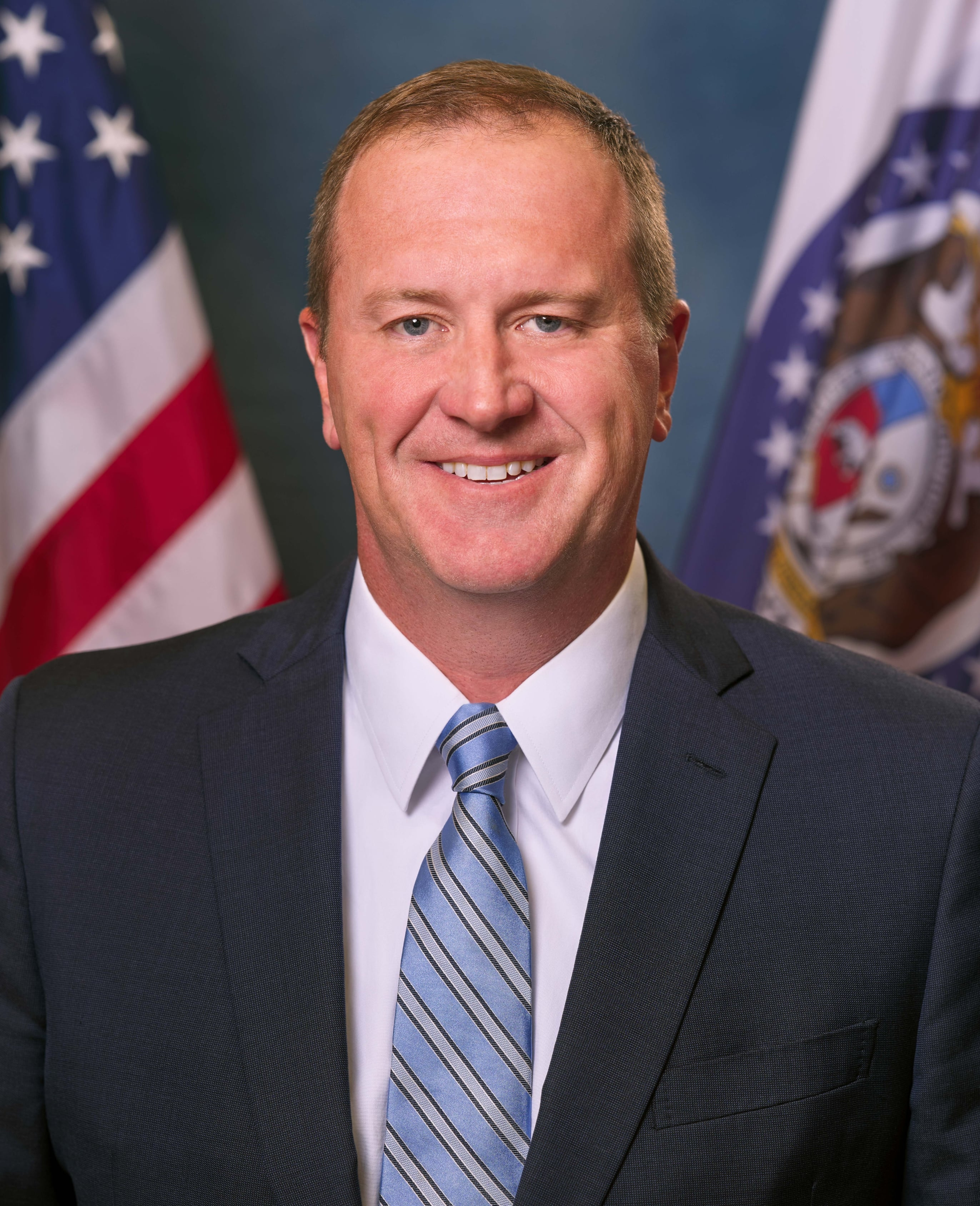
- Official portrait, 2023

United States Senator from Missouri
- Incumbent
- Assumed office January 3, 2023 Serving with Josh Hawley
- Preceded by: Roy Blunt

Vice Chair of the Joint Economic Committee
- Incumbent
- Assumed office January 3, 2025
- Preceded by: David Schweikert

43rd Attorney General of Missouri
- In office January 3, 2019 – January 3, 2023
- Governor: Mike Parson
- Preceded by: Josh Hawley
- Succeeded by: Andrew Bailey

46th Treasurer of Missouri
- In office January 9, 2017 – January 3, 2019
- Governor: Eric Greitens; Mike Parson
- Preceded by: Clint Zweifel
- Succeeded by: Scott Fitzpatrick

Member of the Missouri Senate from the 15th district
- In office January 7, 2009 – January 4, 2017
- Preceded by: Michael R. Gibbons
- Succeeded by: Andrew Koenig

Personal details
- Born: June 20, 1975 (age 51) Bridgeton, Missouri, U.S.
- Party: Republican
- Spouse: Jaime Forrester (m. 1999)
- Children: 3
- Education: Truman State University (BA); Saint Louis University (JD)
- Website: Senate website Campaign website
- Schmitt's voice Schmitt questions witnesses on Chinese assets in foreign ports Recorded February 15, 2023

Eric Stephen Schmitt (born June 20, 1975) is an American attorney and politician serving since 2023 as the junior United States senator from Missouri. A member of the Republican Party, Schmitt served as the 46th state treasurer of Missouri from 2017 to 2019 and as the 43rd Missouri attorney general from 2019 to 2023.

Schmitt began his political career as an alderman for Glendale, Missouri. From 2009 to 2017, he represented the 15th district in the Missouri Senate, during which he sponsored major reductions in the state income tax and franchise tax, and expanded benefits and tax exemptions for disabled citizens. As a state senator, Schmitt also led a bipartisan effort in response to the Ferguson unrest to successfully eliminate traffic ticket quotas and limit local revenues from non-traffic fines. In 2016, Schmitt was elected State Treasurer of Missouri.

In 2018, Governor Mike Parson appointed Schmitt Missouri Attorney General. He was elected to a full four-year term as attorney general in 2020. As attorney general, he filed or joined lawsuits seeking to invalidate the Affordable Care Act, challenge the results of the 2020 presidential election (in Texas v. Pennsylvania), and, on 25 occasions, oppose the policies of the Joe Biden administration. He also sued school districts and municipalities for implementing mask requirements during the COVID-19 pandemic and sued the government of China and Chinese Communist Party for their alleged role in the pandemic.

In 2022, Schmitt was elected to the U.S. Senate, defeating Democratic nominee Trudy Busch Valentine. He is the vice chair of the Congressional Joint Economic Committee. As a senator, Schmitt supports national conservatism, and was a speaker at the 2025 National Conservatism Conference. During his Senate term, he is best known for his unsuccessful efforts to catch special counsel Jack Smith in a perjury trap during a Senate Judiciary Committee hearing in September 2026.

== Early life and education ==
Schmitt was born in Bridgeton, Missouri, a suburb of St. Louis. He graduated from DeSmet Jesuit High School in 1993 and from Truman State University in 1997, with a BA in political science. At Truman, Schmitt was a member of the Alpha Kappa Lambda fraternity, played football and baseball, and was a founding member of Truman's Habitat for Humanity chapter. He received a scholarship to attend Saint Louis University School of Law, where he earned his JD in 2000.

== Personal life ==
For the fall 2018 semester, Schmitt was an adjunct faculty member at Saint Louis University. He is Catholic.

== Early law and political career ==
=== Lawyer and Glendale alderman ===
Schmitt was admitted to the Missouri bar in 2000. He was a partner at the firm Lathrop & Gage, LLP in Clayton, Missouri. Schmitt served as an alderman for Glendale, Missouri, from 2005 to 2008; he was one of two aldermen for Ward 3.

=== Missouri Senate (2009–2017) ===
On November 4, 2008, Schmitt was elected to the Missouri Senate. He represented the 15th district, which includes parts of central and western St. Louis County. Following the 2010 census, Schmitt's district was redrawn, but still centered around central St. Louis County. Schmitt ran unopposed in both the primary and general elections in 2012.

In 2016, Schmitt sponsored S.B. 572, which set a limit on the percent of revenue that Missouri local governments could obtain from non-traffic fines (such as fines for violation of city ordinances). The bill passed the state Senate in a 25–6 vote in January 2016. After the Ferguson unrest, Schmitt said that too many municipalities overrelied on fines to raise revenue and fund their budgets. He led the bipartisan legislative effort to bar cities, counties and law-enforcement agencies from setting traffic-ticket quotas. Schmitt worked with Senator Jamilah Nasheed and others on the legislation, which passed the State Senate in February 2016 and was enacted into law.

In 2010, Schmitt, who has a son with autism, supported a bill in the Missouri General Assembly that required health insurers to pay up to $40,000 annually to beneficiaries for applied behavioral analysis, a type of autism therapy. In 2015, he worked to enact legislation allowing Missouri residents to establish tax-exempt savings accounts for relatives with disabilities. Governor Jay Nixon signed the bill in 2015.

In the State Senate, Schmitt championed tax-cut legislation. He sponsored a major franchise tax cut, which passed. In 2013, he introduced legislation that would halve the state's corporate income tax and reduce taxes on C corporations. Schmitt and supporters promoted the tax as a way to match the Kansas experiment, while opponents called the taxes economically unsustainable. The legislation, enacted in 2014, also lowered state income taxes by 0.1% beginning in 2018.

In 2016, Schmitt joined 23 other Republican members of the State Senate in voting in favor of SB 656, a bill that removed the requirement for a permit to open carry and added a "stand your ground" provision. After it passed the state legislature, Governor Jay Nixon vetoed the bill, but the veto was overridden by the legislature.

== Missouri state treasurer (2017–2019) ==
Schmitt did not run for reelection to the Missouri Senate in 2016 because he was term-limited. Instead, he filed to run for treasurer of Missouri in the 2016 elections. Schmitt ran as a Republican and was unopposed in the Republican primary. He defeated Democrat Judy Baker and Libertarian Sean O'Toole in the general election.

Schmitt launched the MO ABLE program in 2017, which is similar to 529 college savings plans. He created the Show-Me Checkbook website which provides data on state spending, state revenues, payroll, debt obligations, and cash flow. In 2014, he sponsored legislation that triggered automatic tax cuts when state revenues exceed certain thresholds.

== Missouri Attorney General (2019–2023) ==
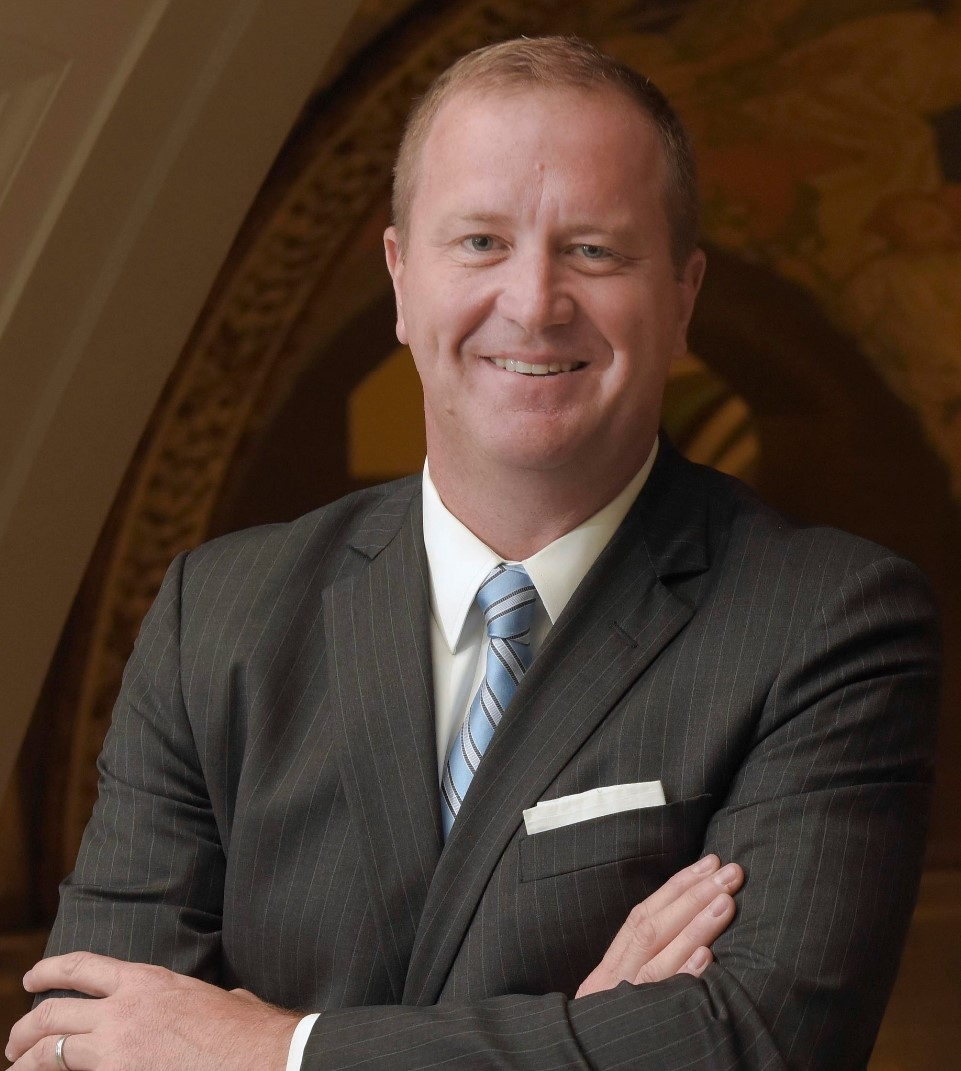
Schmitt during his tenure as attorney general

Governor Mike Parson appointed Schmitt as Missouri Attorney General to succeed Josh Hawley, who was elected to the U.S. Senate in 2018. Schmitt took office in January 2019. In 2020, he was elected to a full term.

Schmitt resigned as attorney general in 2023 after his election to the U.S. Senate in 2022.

=== Affordable Care Act ===
Schmitt filed lawsuits to have the Affordable Care Act invalidated by courts. After Missouri voters approved a constitutional amendment to expand Medicaid coverage in the state, he argued that Republican lawmakers and Governor Mike Parson could legally refuse to implement the expansion. The Missouri Supreme Court rejected that position in a 2021 ruling.

=== COVID-19 pandemic ===
During the COVID-19 pandemic in Missouri, Schmitt filed lawsuits to prevent St. Louis County from implementing public health restrictions (such as restrictions on indoor dining, mask mandates and limits on gatherings) to reduce COVID-19's spread. He opposed the release from jail of some inmates charged with violent felonies during the pandemic, a measure that had been proposed to reduce COVID-19 spread in detention facilities.

Schmitt was involved in efforts to combat scammers and price gougers attempting to profiteer from COVID-19. In March 2020, he sued televangelist Jim Bakker and Morningside Church Productions, Inc. for falsely claiming that "Silver Solution" (colloidal silver) was an effective COVID-19 treatment.

In April 2020, on behalf of the State of Missouri, Schmitt sued the Chinese government, Chinese Communist Party, and other Chinese officials and institutions in the U.S. District Court for the Eastern District of Missouri, alleging that their actions to suppress information, arrest whistleblowers, and deny COVID-19's contagious nature led to loss of life and severe economic consequences in Missouri. Missouri is the first state to sue China over the pandemic. Schmitt described the lawsuit as a historic accountability measure, but legal experts called it a public relations stunt. The nine defendants were not served for more than a year after the complaint's filing, and the state spent $12,000 to translate the complaint into Chinese. In July 2022, U.S. District Judge Stephen N. Limbaugh Jr. dismissed the suit for lack of subject-matter jurisdiction, noting that the defendants enjoyed sovereign immunity.

In August 2021, Schmitt sued local school districts in Missouri after they implemented mask mandates. In September 2021, he sued Jackson County, Missouri, for enforcing an order that required restaurants to comply with a mask mandate. In November 2021, the Missouri Department of Health concluded a study that found mask mandates were associated with reductions in COVID-19 infections and deaths in Missouri.

=== Criminal prosecutions and convictions ===
In 2019, Schmitt launched the SAFE Kit Initiative to reduce the backlog of untested sexual assault kits in Missouri. As of October 2021, approximately two thousand kits had been examined under the initiative and thousands remained to be tested.

In January 2020, Schmitt prosecuted a murder case in the City of St. Louis. The jury returned a quick verdict, finding Antonio Muldrew guilty of first-degree murder for shooting and killing Ethiopian refugee Abdulrauf Kadir at a convenience store in 2014. This was the first time a Missouri attorney general prosecuted a murder case in the City of St. Louis.

On July 21, 2020, Schmitt filed amicus briefs that argued that "Missouri's statutes specifically authorize Missouri citizens to use firearms to deter assailants and protect themselves, their families, and homes from threatening or violent intruders" and requested dismissal of cases filed by prosecutor Kimberly Gardner against Patricia and Mark Thomas McCloskey for brandishing firearms at protesters who had trespassed on their property while marching in St. Louis in 2020. Schmitt expressed concern about "the chilling effect that this [case] might have with people exercising their Second Amendment rights."

Schmitt opposed motions calling for the release of Lamar Johnson, who was convicted for murder on the basis of a single eyewitness's testimony, after a conviction integrity unit found "overwhelming evidence" of Johnson's innocence in 2019. Prior to hearings on his release, Schmitt unsuccessfully called for sanctions on St. Louis Circuit Attorney Kimberly Gardner. In February 2023, Circuit Judge David Mason found "clear and convincing evidence" that Johnson was not guilty and ordered his release in February 2023 after 28 years in prison.

Schmitt also opposed the release Kevin Strickland, who served 43 years before his release in November 2021, on procedural grounds after Jean Peters-Baker, the prosecutor responsible for reviewing his case, publicly expressed her belief in his innocence. Schmitt's office took the position that the law allowing Peters-Baker to challenge the wrongful conviction required an adversarial process, in which the office of the Attorney General represented the state, as a check on local prosecutorial authority. A judge rejected a motion to retitle the case State of Missouri v. Jean Peters Baker. Despite their procedural argument, assistant attorney general Andrew Clarke said the office believed Strickland to be guilty and that he should remain incarcerated. In August 2021, Schmitt's office issued a subpoena requiring Peters-Baker to turn over any communication with third parties regarding the case, which she characterized as "harassment." After Strickland's release, Peters-Baker said Schmitt's handling of the case amounted to "prosecutorial malpractice" and referred to his procedural position as "profoundly idiotic".

In 2022, Schmitt reiterated his position on the attorney general's role in innocence proceedings and attempted to dismiss hearings on Michael Politte's conviction for the 1998 murder of his mother in Washington County, after a Washington County prosecutor filed a motion for exoneration on the grounds that 2002 chromatography analysis from case had been "scientifically proven false" after a review by the Missouri State Highway Patrol. The case continued under his successor, Andrew Bailey.

=== Lawsuits against Joe Biden administration ===
In a 20-month span, Schmitt filed 25 lawsuits against the Biden administration with mixed results. The number of cases filed against the administration by Missouri during his tenure was second only to Louisiana.

- In 2021, Schmitt led a lawsuit against the Biden administration challenging COVID-19 vaccine requirements for health care workers.
- In 2021, Schmitt challenged the administration's decision to suspend new oil and gas leases on federal land and water.
- In 2021, Schmitt and 13 other Republican state attorneys general sued to block an executive order directing federal agencies to consider the social costs of emissions of greenhouse gases (carbon, methane and nitrous oxide) in regulatory cost-benefit analyses.
- In 2021, Schmitt and 21 other Republican attorneys general sued the Biden administration over Biden's revocation of the permit for the Keystone XL Pipeline.
- In 2022, Schmitt and Jeff Landry of Louisiana sued the federal government, claiming it was censoring anti-vaccine activism on social media. In 2024, the Supreme Court in Murthy v. Missouri rejected the case due to the plaintiffs' lack of standing. In the decision, Justice Amy Coney Barrett found no evidence of government coercion and wrote that plaintiffs could not "manufacture standing" based on hypothetical or self-inflicted harm.
- In 2022, Schmitt and 21 other Republican state attorneys general sued the Biden administration over a program that prohibits discrimination based on sexual orientation and gender identity in schools that receive federal funds.
- In September 2022, Schmitt joined a lawsuit on behalf of the Higher Education Loan Authority of the State of Missouri to block the administration's executive order on student debt relief. The lawsuit continued to the Supreme Court after Schmitt left the office of attorney general. In Biden v. Nebraska, the Court held that the United States Secretary of Education lacked the authority to waive student loans.

=== Texas v. Pennsylvania ===
In 2020, Schmitt was among 17 Republican attorneys general who joined Texas attorney general Ken Paxton in suing Georgia, Michigan, Wisconsin, and Pennsylvania to invalidate their electoral votes in the 2020 United States presidential election. The suit claimed the four states' presidential vote tallies were unconstitutional; no evidence supported these claims and the arguments had already been rejected in other state and federal courts. On December 11, 2020, the Supreme Court rejected the suit in an unsigned opinion.

=== Other lawsuits, investigations, and prosecutions ===
In August 2019, Schmitt withdrew a legal brief that argued that the First Amendment allowed government officials to withhold records from a freedom of information request, following criticism from transparency advocates who noted that the brief did not cite any case law. A Freedom Center of Missouri representative raised concern that the argument is similar to a case involving Governor Mike Parson, which Schmitt had not yet ruled on.

Under Schmitt, the attorney general's office sued the city of Marshfield, Missouri, alleging that it maintained a ticket-quota system, in violation of the state law Schmitt had sponsored as state senator banning such quotas. In 2020, the suit ended in a settlement in which the city agreed to maintain a compliance program and have its state officials undergo training on the law.

In September 2019, a bipartisan group of state attorneys general, including Schmitt, launched an antitrust investigation against Google. The attorneys general accused Google of prioritizing searches for companies that advertise on the search engine platform in violation of antitrust law.

== U.S. Senate (2023–present) ==
=== Elections ===
2022 senate election result by county

==== 2022 ====
On March 24, 2021, Schmitt announced his candidacy for the United States Senate to succeed incumbent Republican Roy Blunt. His candidacy was backed by Missouri mega-donor Rex Sinquefield. In the speech announcing his candidacy, Schmitt tied himself to Donald Trump and railed against "the radical left". He pledged to vote against Mitch McConnell as party leader in the Senate. Schmitt made his legal challenges to the Biden administration a major theme of his U.S. Senate campaign.

The day before the primary, Trump released a statement endorsing "ERIC". Schmitt was joined in the Republican primary by two other candidates with that name, former governor Eric Greitens and lesser-known candidate Eric McElroy. Trump did not indicate which candidate or candidates he was endorsing, and declined to clarify. Politico reported it as an endorsement of both Greitens and Schmitt, as Trump had apparently expressed indecision about which of the two to back before a dual endorsement was suggested; he separately contacted both to pledge his support, and each subsequently claimed the endorsement as his.

Schmitt won the Republican primary on August 2, 2022, with 45.6% of the vote. He won the general election with 55.4%, defeating Democratic nominee Trudy Busch Valentine by a margin of 13.2%.

=== Tenure ===
Upon the opening of the 118th United States Congress on January 3, 2023, Schmitt was sworn in by Senate president and Vice President Kamala Harris. He tweeted that he was honored to be the 2,000th senator to hold office in the history of the Senate.

Schmitt was among the 31 Senate Republicans who voted against final passage of the Fiscal Responsibility Act of 2023, a bill to raise the debt ceiling.

In February 2025, when NBC's Kristen Welker asked Schmitt the same question posed to Tulsi Gabbard during her Director of National Intelligence confirmation hearing—whether he would call Edward Snowden a traitor—he said many asking this oppose Gabbard because she would "reform and curb the excesses and the worst instincts of the intelligence community that at times has gone after presidential candidates".

Later that month, after Trump called Ukrainian president Volodymyr Zelenskyy a "dictator" and said Ukraine was at fault for the Ukraine war, Schmitt said Zelenskyy should not be "openly criticizing" Trump and should "stop lecturing" him. Schmitt said Trump had spoken "a lot on the campaign trail" about "trying to negotiate a peace deal between Russia and Ukraine. ... He's a master negotiator, and I think he's going to get to a lasting peace." According to ABC News, Schmitt was the only Republican senator "to seemingly offer both support for Trump and the premise of his statements on Ukraine and Russia".

At the start of the 119th Congress in 2025, Schmitt hired Nate Hochman as a staffer. Hochman had previously worked for the Ron DeSantis 2024 presidential campaign but was fired after producing a promotional video for DeSantis that featured fascist imagery, including a sonnenrad, a symbol used by neo-Nazis and white supremacists. In September 2025, Hochman promoted a speech on social media that Schmitt delivered at the National Conservatism Conference, titled "What is an American?". In the speech Schmitt criticized legal immigration, and said that America was not a "universal proposition" open to anyone. He said, "Our people tamed the continent, built a civilization from the wilderness ... We Americans are the sons and daughters of the Christian pilgrims who poured out onto the ocean's shores ... America belongs to us, and only us." Of America's founders, he said: "They fought, they bled, they struggled, they died for us. They built this country for us. America, in all its glory, is their gift to us, handed down across the generations. It belongs to us. It's our birthright, our heritage, our destiny. If America is everything and everyone, then it is nothing and no one at all. But we know that's not true. America is not a 'universal nation.'" The Guardian asked Schmitt's office if Hochman was involved in writing the speech; Schmitt's office did not reply. Ed Kilgore of New York Magazine said Schmitt's speech promoted the idea of America as a "blood and soil homeland"; David Corn called it "implied white supremacy". Jason Wilson of The Guardian said that Schmitt was "attempting to articulate white nationalist politics in a way that is not so explicit that people who aren't clued into this sort of stuff will notice."

In April 2025, when asked about Trump's defunding of Title X grants to Missouri healthcare providers, Schmitt said he would be "happy to look at it more closely" and questioned the severity of the defunding of federal programs. Also in April, Schmitt filed a bill to make Easter Monday a federal holiday.

Schmitt accuses Jack Smith of perjury during a Senate Judiciary Committee in September 2026

On September 29, 2026, Schmitt received national attention and criticism for his erroneous line of questioning during a Senate Judiciary Committee hearing about the Smith special counsel investigation into Donald Trump's attempts to overturn the 2020 presidential election. Schmitt falsely accused the witness, former special counsel Jack Smith, of perjury for denying that he had attended an Atlanta Hawks–Golden State Warriors basketball game in Atlanta on February 3, 2024. Schmitt's line of questioning suggested that Smith had been in Atlanta for the purpose of improperly colluding with the election racketeering prosecution of Trump led by Fulton County district attorney Fani Willis. But Smith did not attend the Hawks game; he went to an Iowa Hawkeyes game in Maryland on that date. Schmitt called Smith "a total dirtbag" during the hearing. Schmitt's error has been called "amateur sleuthing", "an embarrassing episode", and "conspiratorial".

=== Committee assignments ===
For the 117th United States Congress, Schmitt was named to two Senate Committees:

- Committee on Armed Services
  - Subcommittee on Cybersecurity
  - Subcommittee on Emerging Threats and Capabilities
  - Subcommittee on Seapower
- Committee on Commerce, Science, and Transportation
  - Subcommittee on Space and Science (Ranking Member)
  - Subcommittee on Communications, Media, and Broadband
  - Subcommittee on Surface Transportation, Maritime, Freight, and Ports

== Political positions ==
=== Abortion ===
On June 24, 2022, minutes after the Supreme Court issued its decision in Dobbs v. Jackson Women's Health Organization, which overturned the constitutional abortion protections in Roe v. Wade and Planned Parenthood v. Casey, Schmitt issued a declaration that his office would enforce a law passed in 2019 that effectively banned abortion in Missouri.

=== Criminal justice ===
As attorney general, Schmitt supported an effort in the Missouri legislature to increase the number of police officers in St. Louis City by lifting the residency requirement for police officers.

=== National conservatism ===
Schmitt supports national conservative positions. Speaking at the 2025 National Conservatism Conference, Schmitt said, "National conservatism is an idea whose time has arrived". In his speech, he criticized the belief that the United States is defined by a shared set of values and principles. Instead, he argued that it is a nation built by settlers as a homeland for themselves and their descendants.

=== Immigration ===
In April 2022, Schmitt repeated a Great Replacement–derived claim on Glenn Beck's program that the Democratic Party seeks to "fundamentally" change the country through illegal immigration to the United States. In a September 2025 speech, Schmitt criticized both legal and illegal immigration to the United States.

=== LGBTQ+ rights ===
In 2019, Schmitt was among 14 Republican state attorneys general signatories who signed an amicus brief to the Supreme Court brief arguing that the Civil Rights Act of 1964 does not protect LGBTQ+ people from employment discrimination. In June 2020, the Supreme Court ruled 6–3 that employment discrimination on the basis of sexual orientation does violate the Civil Rights Act of 1964.

=== Military ===
In 2026, Schmitt blocked a measure to fund the U.S. Coast Guard during a partial government shutdown. While the U.S. Department of Defense was funded, and other five branches of the military were paid, the Coast Guard is a part of the Department of Homeland Security due to its law enforcement authorities and worked without the guarantee they would be paid.

=== Religion and schools ===
In 2019, Schmitt spoke in defense of the Cameron R-1 School District after it came under criticism from the Freedom From Religion Foundation over a high school football coach who led students in prayer before and after games. The group contended that the practice violating the Establishment Clause of the First Amendment. In a letter, Schmitt called the foundation an "extreme anti-religion organization" and said he would support the coach, school, and school district if the group sued.

=== Second Amendment ===
In 2022, Schmitt received an "A+" rating and endorsement from the NRA Political Victory Fund.

== Electoral history ==
2008 Missouri Senate 15th district election
Party	Candidate	Votes	%
Republican	Eric Schmitt	51,366	54.7
Democratic	James Trout	42,469	45.3
Total votes		93,835	100.0

2012 Missouri Senate 15th district election
Party	Candidate	Votes	%	±%
Republican	Eric Schmitt	77,745	100	+45.3
Total votes		77,745	100.0	

2016 Missouri State Treasurer election
Party	Candidate	Votes	%
Republican	Eric Schmitt	1,545,582	56.4
Democratic	Judy Baker	1,078,063	39.4
Libertarian	Sean O'Toole	78,543	2.9
Green	Carol Hexem	66,490	1.3
Total votes		2,738,122	100.0

2020 Missouri Attorney General election
Party	Candidate	Votes	%
Republican	Eric Schmitt	1,752,792	59.4
Democratic	Rich Finnernan	1,117,713	37.9
Libertarian	Kevin Babcock	81,100	2.7
Total votes		2,951,605	100.0%

2022 United States Senate Republican primary in Missouri
Party	Candidate	Votes	%
Republican	Eric Schmitt	299,282	45.6
Republican	Vicky Hartzler	144,903	22.1
Republican	Eric Greitens	124,155	18.9
Republican	Billy Long	32,603	5.0
Republican	Mark McCloskey	19,540	3.0
Republican	Dave Schatz	7,509	1.1
Republican	others	27,683	4.2
Total votes		655,675	100.0

2022 United States Senate election in Missouri
Party	Candidate	Votes	%	±%
Republican	Eric Schmitt	1,146,966	55.43	+6.25
Democratic	Trudy Busch Valentine	872,694	42.18	−4.21
Libertarian	Jonathan Dine	34,821	1.68	−0.74
Constitution	Paul Venable	14,608	0.71	−0.20
Total votes		2,069,130	100.0	

Party political offices
Preceded by Cole McNary	Republican nominee for Treasurer of Missouri; 2016	Succeeded by Scott Fitzpatrick
Preceded by Josh Hawley	Republican nominee for Attorney General of Missouri; 2020	Succeeded by Andrew Bailey
Preceded by Roy Blunt	Republican nominee for U.S. Senator from Missouri (Class 3); 2022	Most recent
Political offices
Preceded by Clint Zweifel	Treasurer of Missouri; 2017–2019	Succeeded by Scott Fitzpatrick
Legal offices
Preceded by Josh Hawley	Attorney General of Missouri; 2019–2023	Succeeded by Andrew Bailey
U.S. Senate
Preceded by Roy Blunt	U.S. Senator (Class 3) from Missouri; 2023–present Served alongside: Josh Hawley	Incumbent
U.S. order of precedence (ceremonial)
Preceded by Katie Britt	Order of precedence of the United States as United States Senator	Succeeded by Pete Ricketts
Preceded by John Fetterman	United States senators by seniority 82nd	Succeeded by Katie Britt
