= Glendale, Missouri =

- City
- Location of Glendale, Missouri
- Coordinates: 38°35′37″N 90°22′57″W
- Country: United States
- State: Missouri
- County: St. Louis

Area
  - Total: 1.30 sq mi (3.36 km^{2})
  - Land: 1.30 sq mi (3.36 km^{2})
  - Water: 0 sq mi (0.00 km^{2})
- Elevation: 587 ft (179 m)

Population (2020)
  - Total: 6,176
  - Density: 4,762.9/sq mi (1,838.95/km^{2})
- Time zone: UTC-6 (Central (CST))
  - Summer (DST): UTC-5 (CDT)
- Postal code: 63122
- Area code: 314
- FIPS code: 29-27334
- GNIS feature ID: 2394913
- Website: www.glendalemo.org

Glendale is a city in St. Louis County, Missouri, United States. As of the 2020 census, Glendale had a population of 6,176.

== History ==
Glendale was voted the best place to live in Missouri in 2014 by movoto.com, and was named after the scenic dales or glens in the region.

== Geography ==
According to the United States Census Bureau, the city has a total area of 1.29 square miles (3.34 km^{2}), all land.

== Demographics ==
Historical population
Census	Pop.	Note	%±
1920	749		—
1930	1,451		93.7%
1940	2,526		74.1%
1950	4,930		95.2%
1960	7,048		43.0%
1970	6,981		−1.0%
1980	6,035		−13.6%
1990	5,945		−1.5%
2000	5,767		−3.0%
2010	5,925		2.7%
2020	6,176		4.2%
U.S. Decennial Census

=== Racial and ethnic composition ===
Glendale city, Missouri – Racial and ethnic composition Note: the US Census treats Hispanic/Latino as an ethnic category. This table excludes Latinos from the racial categories and assigns them to a separate category. Hispanics/Latinos may be of any race.
Race / Ethnicity (NH = Non-Hispanic)	Pop 2000	Pop 2010	Pop 2020	% 2000	% 2010	% 2020
White alone (NH)	5,575	5,673	5,706	96.67%	95.75%	92.39%
Black or African American alone (NH)	51	44	41	0.88%	0.74%	0.66%
Native American or Alaska Native alone (NH)	2	0	3	0.03%	0.00%	0.05%
Asian alone (NH)	32	56	57	0.55%	0.95%	0.92%
Native Hawaiian or Pacific Islander alone (NH)	0	0	0	0.00%	0.00%	0.00%
Other race alone (NH)	8	5	12	0.14%	0.08%	0.19%
Mixed race or Multiracial (NH)	34	55	179	0.59%	0.93%	2.90%
Hispanic or Latino (any race)	65	92	178	1.13%	1.55%	2.88%
Total	5,767	5,925	6,176	100.00%	100.00%	100.00%

=== 2020 census ===
As of the 2020 census, Glendale had a population of 6,176. The median age was 40.3 years. 28.5% of residents were under the age of 18 and 17.6% were 65 years of age or older. For every 100 females, there were 91.1 males, and for every 100 females age 18 and over, there were 86.6 males age 18 and over.

100.0% of residents lived in urban areas, while 0.0% lived in rural areas.

There were 2,282 households, of which 39.0% had children under the age of 18 living in them. Of all households, 67.0% were married-couple households, 8.2% were households with a male householder and no spouse or partner present, and 21.8% were households with a female householder and no spouse or partner present. About 21.8% of all households were made up of individuals, and 11.7% had someone living alone who was 65 years of age or older.

There were 2,345 housing units, of which 2.7% were vacant. The homeowner vacancy rate was 0.9% and the rental vacancy rate was 8.8%.

=== 2010 census ===
As of the census of 2010, there were 5,925 people, 2,273 households, and 1,686 families living in the city. The population density was 4,593.0 inhabitants per square mile (1,773.4/km^{2}). There were 2,348 housing units at an average density of 1,820.2 per square mile (702.8/km^{2}). The racial makeup of the city was 96.7% White, 0.7% African American, 0.9% Asian, 0.4% from other races, and 1.1% from two or more races. Hispanic or Latino of any race were 1.6% of the population.

There were 2,273 households, of which 38.6% had children under the age of 18 living with them, 65.2% were married couples living together, 7.4% had a female householder with no husband present, 1.6% had a male householder with no wife present, and 25.8% were non-families. 23.5% of all households were made up of individuals, and 10.2% had someone living alone who was 65 years of age or older. The average household size was 2.61 and the average family size was 3.11.

The median age in the city was 40.5 years. 29.2% of residents were under the age of 18; 4% were between the ages of 18 and 24; 23.7% were from 25 to 44; 29.3% were from 45 to 64; and 13.8% were 65 years of age or older. The gender makeup of the city was 46.2% male and 53.8% female.

=== 2000 census ===
As of the census of 2000, there were 5,767 people, 2,294 households, and 1,640 families living in the city. The population density was 4,474.6 inhabitants per square mile (1,727.7/km^{2}). There were 2,339 housing units at an average density of 1,814.8 per square mile (700.7/km^{2}). The racial makeup of the city was 97.61% White, 0.88% African American, 0.03% Native American, 0.55% Asian, 0.31% from other races, and 0.61% from two or more races. Hispanic or Latino of any race were 1.13% of the population.

There were 2,294 households, out of which 35.7% had children under the age of 18 living with them, 62.6% were married couples living together, 7.4% had a female householder with no husband present, and 28.5% were non-families. 26.0% of all households were made up of individuals, and 11.6% had someone living alone who was 65 years of age or older. The average household size was 2.51 and the average family size was 3.06.

In the city the population was spread out, with 27.7% under the age of 18, 3.7% from 18 to 24, 28.3% from 25 to 44, 25.9% from 45 to 64, and 14.5% who were 65 years of age or older. The median age was 40 years. For every 100 females, there were 88.6 males. For every 100 females age 18 and over, there were 83.1 males.

The median income for a household in the city was $75,279, and the median income for a family was $90,250. Males had a median income of $70,018 versus $36,552 for females. The per capita income for the city was $35,136. About 0.4% of families and 0.4% of the population were below the poverty line, including 0.3% of those under age 18 and none of those age 65 or over.

== Notable people ==
The following are people who have either resided in Glendale or regularly visited.

- Gerty and Carl Ferdinand Cori, a couple who won the Nobel Prize in Physiology or Medicine in 1947
- Eric Schmitt, U.S. senator; former Missouri Attorney General
