= Macks Creek Law =

Missouri law limiting the percentage of municipal revenue from traffic tickets

- Seal of Missouri

State of Missouri
- Enacted by: State of Missouri
- Signed: 1995
- Introduced by: Delbert Scott

Amended by
- various changes in 2009, 2013, 2015

The Macks Creek Law is the common name for a series of legislation passed by the US state of Missouri that limits the percentage of municipal revenues allowed from traffic violations. The first incarnation of the bill was put forward by Delbert Scott in response to a notorious speed trap on US 54 in Macks Creek, Missouri, and was enacted in 1995. An audit of Macks Creek in 1997 uncovered significant financial problems, and the city declared bankruptcy the next year. The voters of the city approved disincorporation in 2012. Ambiguous wording in the bill led to difficulties in enforcement, and in early 2009, the St. Louis Post-Dispatch reported that no excess revenues had been remitted under the provisions of the law. Amendments in 2009 and 2013 lowered the cap from 45% of general operating revenues to 30%, and the later amendment also resolved some of the ambiguities in the law's wording.

The 2013 amendment also contained a provision that would allow for the loss of municipal court authority, which led to a lawsuit from the Missouri Municipal League. Police ticketing procedures came under greater attention after the Ferguson unrest in 2014, and additional bills were passed that changed the law's procedures, which led to the prior lawsuit being dismissed. Those bills also reduced the cap to 20% in most of the state, with a 12.5% cap in St. Louis County. The lower cap in St. Louis County was struck down by the Missouri Supreme Court, and an attempt to reinstate it was denied in 2022.

== Background ==
Location of Macks Creek in Missouri

The city of Macks Creek, Missouri, a town in the Lake of the Ozarks area located on U.S. Route 54, had become a notorious speed trap by the early 1990s. Macks Creek had a population of roughly 270, but wrote around 2,900 tickets for traffic violations a year; the municipality received about 75% of its revenue from these fines. After being ticketed in Macks Creek, Missouri state legislator Delbert Scott wrote a bill that was approved in 1995, becoming the original form of the Macks Creek Law. Originally, the law capped the percentage of municipal revenue that could come from traffic violations at 45%, with any excess over that limit to be remitted to school districts. The bill defined the percentage as being based on "general operating revenue", but the definition of this was unclear, leading to disputes, including one with the city of Lone Jack in 2012. Revenues that count against the cap include both the traffic fines themselves as well as court costs charged to the case; data about the revenues from traffic violations is required to be reported to the Missouri State Auditor's Office annually.

== Effects ==
The passage of the law devastated Macks Creek's municipal budget, and the town had additional significant financial problems, including mismanagement, which were revealed by a state audit released in 1997. Some findings implied that to avoid the law, the city had ticketed parking violations instead of the traffic violations targeted by the law. The city eventually disbanded its police force, with a Washington Post article from July 1998 reporting that the police force had been "laid off more than a year ago". Faced with financial difficulties, the city filed for bankruptcy in 1998. Six years later, an electoral measure on disincorporation was put forward, but did not succeed. Voters of the city eventually approved disincorporation in 2012. In late October of that year, it was reported that the city was having difficulties dissolving due to its poor financial state: the Columbia Daily Tribune reported that the city had over $25,000 of overdue debts, but less than $5,000 in cash, most of which was fuel tax proceeds that were restricted in use.

Portions of the law as originally passed proved to be ambiguously worded. The law could be read as counting only moving violations against the cap, which led to cities reclassifying traffic charges from moving to non-moving violations. Additionally, the only fines over the cap that were disallowed were those on "federal and state roads"; as tickets could also be given for violations on county or city-operated roads, and as there was no requirement to keep track of what roads tickets had been given on, enforcement was difficult. Enforcement was hampered by insufficient data to such a degree that as of May 2009, the St. Louis Post-Dispatch reported that the distributions of excess revenue had never occurred. An amendment to the law in 2013 resolved those two issues; the legal wording was expanded to cover all traffic violations, removing the restriction on ticket location and also adding language that directly included "amended charges".

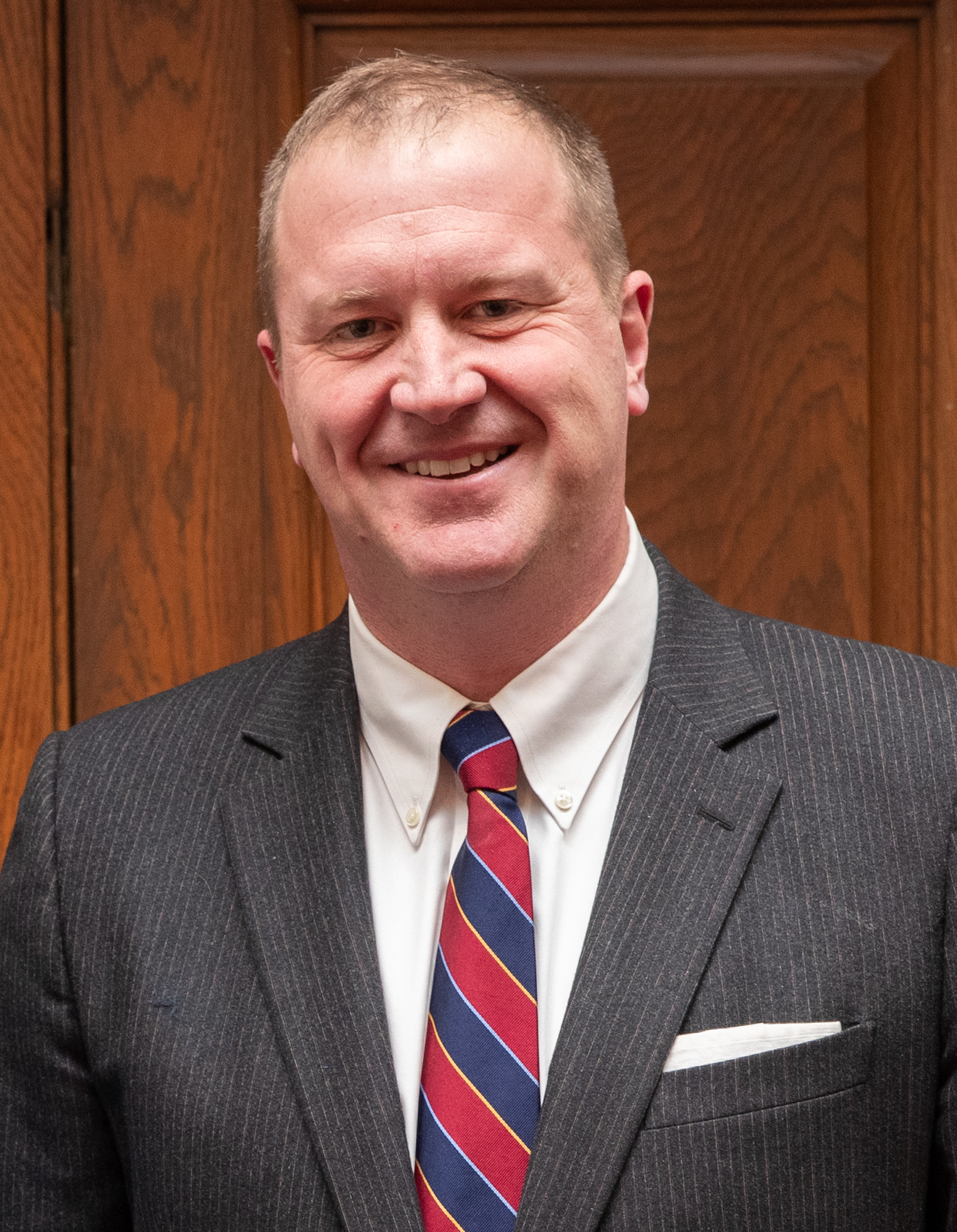
Eric Schmitt, who was involved with the law both as a Missouri State Senator and as Missouri Attorney General

In 2009, Missouri State Senate member John Griesheimer proposed an amendment to the bill that would reduce the cap to 35%. This reduction was approved, and in 2013 was lowered again to 30%. The 2013 amendment also included a provision that would result in failure to comply with the law's reporting requirements triggering the loss of municipal court authority. The Missouri Municipal League sued the state over the new provision in September 2013, and appealed to the Missouri Supreme Court in 2014 after losing at the circuit court level. In August 2014, the shooting of Michael Brown and subsequent Ferguson unrest in Ferguson, Missouri, led to additional media attention on the ticketing practices of police departments in the St. Louis area, and in turn to the enforcement of the Macks Creek Law. On December 1, state senator Eric Schmitt proposed Senate Bill 5 (S.B. 5), which would further lower the cap on ticket fines. That same month, the Missouri Attorney General, Chris Koster, sued 13 municipalities in the St. Louis area for violating the Macks Creek Law. By January 2015, four additional municipalities were added as defendants, although by then six cities had come into compliance and two more had remitted excess monies to the state. A further eight of the municipalities were dismissed from the lawsuit in March. By April, 16 of the 17 total municipalities sued were in compliance.

In 2015, the United States Department of Justice released the results of an investigation that determined that Ferguson had both used its police department particularly for revenue purpose and engaged in racially discriminatory policing practices. S.B. 5 was successfully enacted, as was the related Senate Bill 572 (S.B. 572). The passage of S.B. 5 led to the Missouri Supreme Court dismissing the earlier lawsuit made by the Missouri Municipal League, under the basis that changes made by the new bill made the complaints of the League's lawsuit moot. Besides adding a provision requiring a disincorporation vote if a municipality fails to remit excess ticketing revenues, the ticketing revenue cap was reduced to 20% for most of the state. However, the bills also included wording that applied a lower cap of 12.5% for counties with a population in excess of 950,000. Per the 2010 United States census, this measure only applied to St. Louis County. The Missouri Supreme Court struck down the lower rate in the 2017 decision City of Normandy v. Greitens, ruling that it was unlawful because it applied only to the county rather than to the state as a whole. The court chose to apply the 20% rate to the county, instead of the 30% rate (the last rate to legislatively apply to St. Louis County), on the basis of legislative intent. The new legislation also led to Koster dropping his lawsuit from the 17th municipal defendant, the city of Hillsdale, Missouri.

In late 2019, the City of Normandy standard was abrogated by another decision in City of Aurora v. Spectra Communications Group, LLC, a court case involving license taxes and right-of-way fees for telecommunications companies, which held that special treatment laws were lawful if there was a rational basis for them. The following January, Schmitt, who was by then the Missouri Attorney General, filed a petition with the circuit court in Cole County to reinstate the 12.5% cap, which was allowed that December, although an appeal was later filed. Schmitt's bid to reinstate the 12.5% cap for St. Louis County was rejected in 2022 by the Missouri Supreme Court, which ruled that the doctrine of finality prevented it from undoing its earlier decision, although an attorney from Jefferson City interviewed by the St. Louis Post-Dispatch opined that if fresh legislative action on the matter was crafted and a rational basis was established, the law could probably be upheld.

The Macks Creek law was suggested as an example comparison for a potential similar cap on sales tax revenue in a 2017 white paper written for a Governor's committee on taxation. As of 2016, similar laws were also on the books in New York, Arkansas, Oklahoma, and Texas. A 2016 article in the Southern Illinois University Law Journal suggested the proactive establishment of a similar law in Illinois, arguing that portions of the Missouri law could have mitigated some of the Ferguson unrest.

== Sources ==
- Anderson, Michelle Wilde (2012). "Dissolving Cities". The Yale Law Journal. 121 (6): 1364–1447.
- Rubinstein, Samuel Lev (2021). "Dismantling Policing for Profit: How to Build on Missouri's Post-Ferguson Court Reforms". University of Michigan Journal of Law Reform. 54 (4): 953–988. doi:10.36646/mjlr.54.4.dismantling.
- Scott, Brian (2016). "From Macks Creek to Ferguson: How Illinois Can Learn From Missouri to Prevent Predatory Enforcement Practices by Municipalities". Southern Illinois University Law Journal. 40 (3): 513–536.
- Walters, Joel (2017). "Tax Policy Reform: Issues to be Addressed for the Benefit of All Missourians". Business, Entrepreneurship & Tax Law Review. 1 (2): 427–471.
