= Delbert Lee Scott =

American businessman and politician

Delbert Lee Scott (born September 9, 1949) is an American businessman and politician from Missouri. He has served as a city councilman for Lowry City, Missouri, as a Republican member of the Missouri House of Representatives, and as a member of the Missouri State Senate. He makes his home in Lowry City, Missouri.

He was born in Clinton, Missouri, and educated at Kansas City College and Bible School (now Kansas Christian College) and Southwest Missouri State University. He is married to Donna Kramer, and they have three children: Todd Scott, Timothy Scott, and Tiffany Scott. He is a member of the Church of God (Holiness), and is in the home furnishings business.

Scott was first elected to the Missouri House of Representatives in a special election on June 11, 1985. Scott became the House Minority Leader in 1997. He served in that body through 2002, when he won election to the Missouri State Senate. Scott was reelected as Senator in 2006 and finished his career in the Missouri government in 2011. He was on the following committees:

- Financial and Governmental Organizations and Elections (chair)
- Pensions, Veteran's Affairs and General Laws
- Small Business, Insurance and Industrial Relations
- Transportation

Following his political career, Scott became the president of Kansas Christian College. Scott stepped down in 2019 and Chad Pollard took over

During his time in the House of Representatives, Scott introduced the Macks Creek Law.
