= 2012 Missouri State Treasurer election =

- November 6, 2012
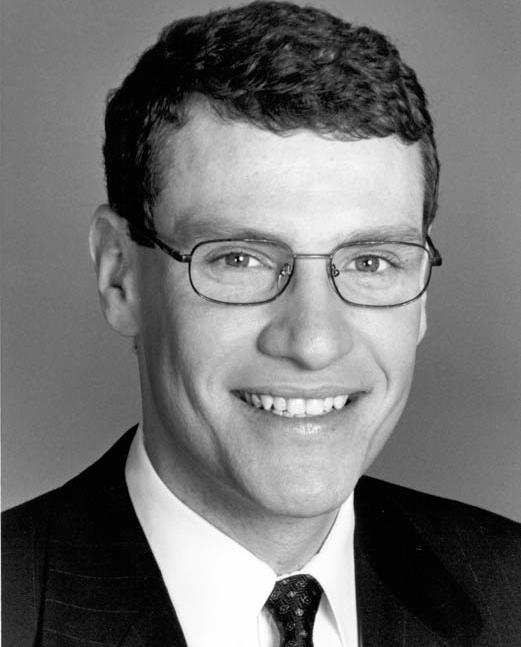

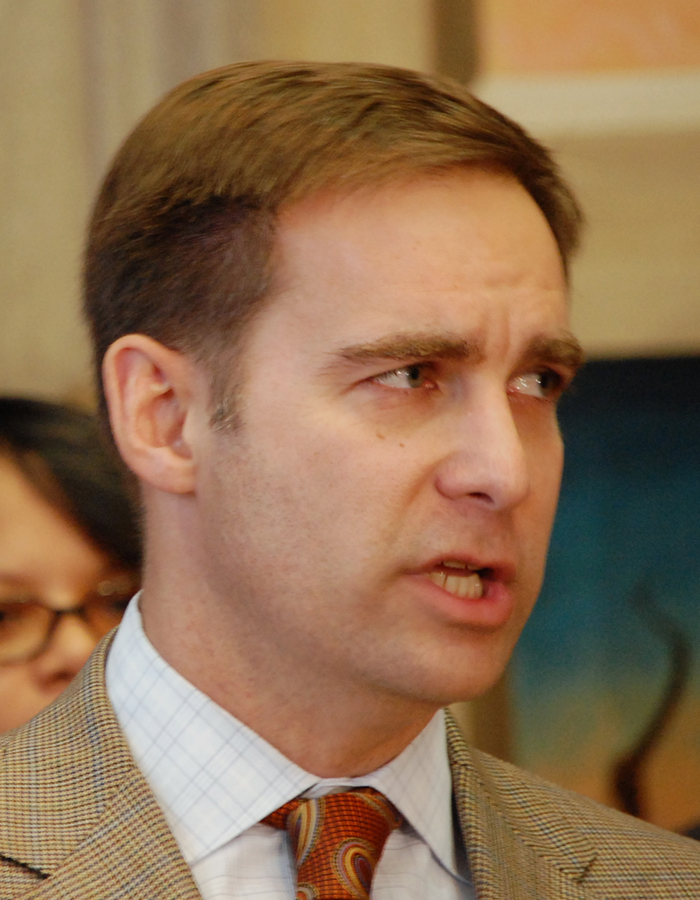
Nominee	Clint Zweifel	Cole McNary
Party	Democratic	Republican
Popular vote	1,332,876	1,200,368
Percentage	50.4%	45.4%
- Zweifel: 40–50% 50–60% 60–70% 80–90% McNary: 40–50% 50–60% 60–70% 70–80%
State Treasurer before election
Clint Zweifel
Democratic
Elected State Treasurer
Clint Zweifel
Democratic

The 2012 Missouri State Treasurer election was held on November 6, 2012, alongside the presidential and gubernatorial elections. Incumbent Democratic State Treasurer Clint Zweifel was re-elected to a second term against Republican State Representative Cole McNary.

== Background ==
Clint Zweifel won the 2008 Missouri state treasurer election, narrowly defeating Republican candidate Brad Lager with 50.5% of the vote.

== Timeline ==
- March 27, 2012 - Filing deadline for Democrats, Republicans and Libertarians
- August 7, 2012 - Primary (gubernatorial and other statewide office) elections
- August 21, 2012 - Filing deadline for other third parties and Independents
- November 6, 2012 - General election

== Major candidates ==
=== Democratic ===
- Clint Zweifel, incumbent state treasurer

=== Republican ===
- Cole McNary, state representative from the 86th District

=== Libertarian ===
- Sean O'Toole

== Results ==
2012 Missouri State Treasurer election
Party	Candidate	Votes	%
Democratic	Clint Zweifel (incumbent)	1,332,876	50.4
Republican	Cole McNary	1,200,368	45.4
Libertarian	Sean O'Toole	109,188	4.1
Total votes		2,642,432	100.0
Democratic hold			

=== By congressional district ===
Despite losing the state, McNary won six of eight congressional districts.

District	Zweifel	McNary	Representative
1st	81%	16%	Lacy Clay
2nd	48%	49%	Todd Akin (112th Congress)
2nd	48%	49%	Ann Wagner (113th Congress)
3rd	45%	50%	Russ Carnahan (112th Congress)
3rd	45%	50%	Blaine Luetkemeyer (113th Congress)
4th	44%	51%	Vicky Hartzler
5th	62%	33%	Emanuel Cleaver
6th	44%	51%	Sam Graves
7th	35%	60%	Billy Long
8th	41%	55%	Jo Ann Emerson

== See also ==
- 2012 United States presidential election in Missouri
- 2012 United States Senate election in Missouri
- 2012 United States House of Representatives elections in Missouri
- 2012 Missouri gubernatorial election
- 2012 Missouri lieutenant gubernatorial election
- 2012 Missouri Attorney General election
- 2012 Missouri Secretary of State election
