= 2008 Missouri State Treasurer election =

- November 4, 2008
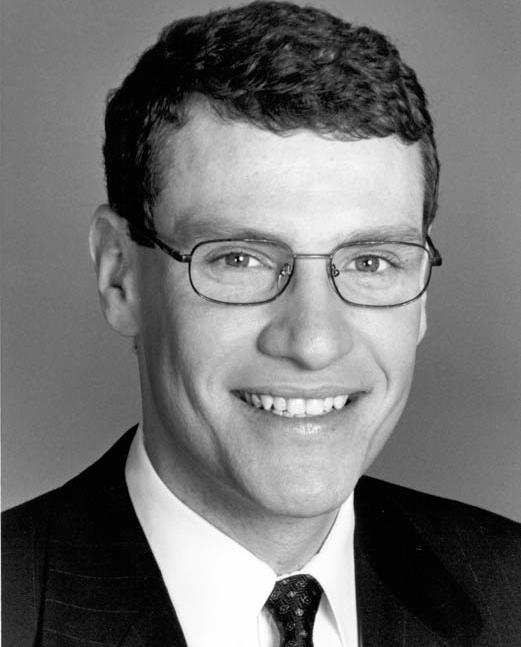

Nominee	Clint Zweifel	Brad Lager
Party	Democratic	Republican
Popular vote	1,394,627	1,302,625
Percentage	50.47%	47.14%
- County results Zweifel: 40–50% 50–60% 60–70% 80–90% Lager: 40–50% 50–60% 60–70% 70–80%
State Treasurer before election
Sarah Steelman
Republican
Elected State Treasurer
Clint Zweifel
Democratic

The 2008 Missouri State Treasurer election was held on November 4, 2008, in order to elect the state treasurer of Missouri. Democratic nominee and incumbent member of the Missouri House of Representatives Clint Zweifel defeated Republican nominee and incumbent member of the Missouri Senate Brad Lager and Constitution nominee Rodney D. Farthing.

== General election ==
On election day, November 4, 2008, Democratic nominee Clint Zweifel won the election by a margin of 92,002 votes against his foremost opponent Republican nominee Brad Lager, thereby gaining Democratic control over the office of state treasurer. Zweifel was sworn in as the 45th state treasurer of Missouri on January 12, 2009.

=== Results ===
Missouri State Treasurer election, 2008
Party	Candidate	Votes	%
Democratic	Clint Zweifel	1,394,627	50.47
Republican	Brad Lager	1,302,625	47.14
Constitution	Rodney D. Farthing	66,062	2.39
Total votes		2,763,314	100.00
Democratic gain from Republican			

== See also ==
- 2008 Missouri gubernatorial election
