= 2020 Missouri Attorney General election =

- November 3, 2020
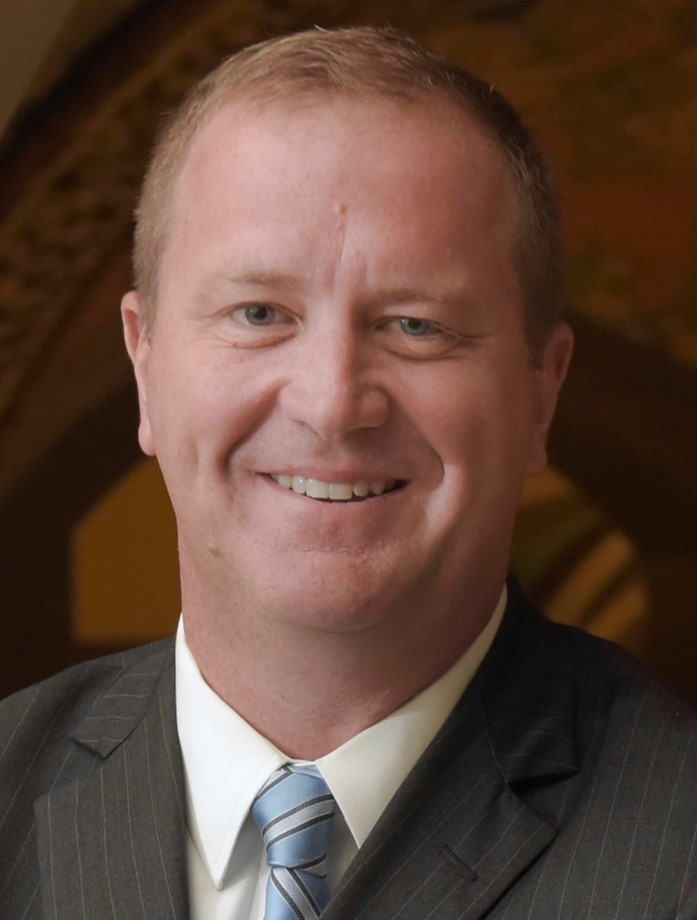

Nominee	Eric Schmitt	Richard Finneran
Party	Republican	Democratic
Popular vote	1,752,792	1,117,713
Percentage	59.38%	37.87%
- Schmitt: 40–50% 50–60% 60–70% 70–80% 80–90% >90% Finneran: 40–50% 50–60% 60–70% 70–80% 80–90% >90% Tie: 40–50% 50% No data
Attorney General before election
Eric Schmitt
Republican
Elected Attorney General
Eric Schmitt
Republican

The 2020 Missouri Attorney General election was held on November 3, 2020, to elect the Attorney General of Missouri. It was held concurrently with the presidential election, along with elections to the United States Senate and United States House of Representatives, as well as various state and local elections. Incumbent Republican Attorney General Eric Schmitt was elected to a full term after he was appointed by Governor Mike Parson when Josh Hawley was elected to the U.S. Senate in 2018.

== Republican primary ==
=== Candidates ===
==== Declared ====
- Eric Schmitt, incumbent Missouri Attorney General

=== Results ===
Republican primary results
Party	Candidate	Votes	%
Republican	Eric Schmitt (incumbent)	602,577	100.00
Total votes		602,577	100.00

== Democratic primary ==
=== Candidates ===
==== Declared ====
- Richard Finneran, former federal prosecutor
- Elad Gross, civil rights attorney and former Assistant Attorney General

=== Endorsements ===
Elad Gross

State legislators

- Rasheen Aldridge Jr., state representative
- Doug Clemens, state representative
- Sarah Unsicker, state representative
- Kevin Windham Jr., state representative

Local officials

- Reggie Jones, mayor of Dellwood

Organizations

- American Federation of Teachers
- Coalition of Black Trade Unionists
- Our Revolution
- Planned Parenthood

=== Results ===
Democratic primary results
Party	Candidate	Votes	%
Democratic	Richard Finneran	272,516	55.39
Democratic	Elad Gross	219,462	44.61
Total votes		491,978	100.00

== Libertarian primary ==
=== Candidates ===
==== Declared ====
- Kevin Babcock

=== Results ===
Libertarian primary results
Party	Candidate	Votes	%
Libertarian	Kevin C. Babcock	4,089	100.00
Total votes		4,089	100.00

== General election ==
=== Predictions ===
Source	Ranking	As of
The Cook Political Report	Safe R	June 25, 2020

=== Polling ===
Poll source	Date(s) administered	Sample size (Note: Key: A – all adults RV – registered voters LV – likely voters V – unclear)	Margin of error	Eric Schmitt (R)	Richard Finneran (D)	Other	Undecided
YouGov/SLU	September 24 – October 7, 2020	931 (LV)	± 3.9%	50%	40%	3%	8%
Remington Research Group/Missouri Scout	September 16–17, 2020	1,046 (LV)	± 3%	50%	36%	–	14%
Human Agency/Missouri Scout	November 17–20, 2019	400 (RV)	± 5%	49%	32%	–	20%

Hypothetical polling

with Elad Gross

Poll source	Date(s) administered	Sample size	Margin of error	Eric Schmitt (R)	Elad Gross (D)	Other	Undecided
Human Agency/Missouri Scout	December 20–24, 2019	415 (RV)	± 5%	52%	34%	14%	
Human Agency/Missouri Scout	October 18–20, 2019	550 (RV)	± 4%	47%	30%	–	23%
Remington Research Group/Missouri Scout	October 9–10, 2019	1,451 (LV)	± 2.5%	53%	37%	10%	
Missouri Scout/Human Agency	September 16–18, 2019	825 (RV)	± 4.0%	42%	31%	28%	

=== Results ===
Missouri Attorney General election, 2020
Party	Candidate	Votes	%	±%
Republican	Eric Schmitt (incumbent)	1,752,792	59.38%	+0.88%
Democratic	Rich Finneran	1,117,713	37.87%	–3.63%
Libertarian	Kevin C. Babock	81,100	2.75%	N/A
Total votes		2,951,605	100.00%	
Republican hold				

==== By congressional district ====
Schmitt won six of eight congressional districts.

District	Schmitt	Finneran	Representative
1st	21%	77%	Lacy Clay (116th Congress)
1st	21%	77%	Cori Bush (117th Congress)
2nd	55%	43%	Ann Wagner
3rd	69%	28%	Blaine Luetkemeyer
4th	68%	29%	Vicky Hartzler
5th	42%	55%	Emanuel Cleaver
6th	66%	31%	Sam Graves
7th	73%	24%	Billy Long
8th	78%	20%	Jason Smith

== See also ==
- 2020 Missouri gubernatorial election
