= Vicky Riback-Wilson =

Missouri politician

Vicky Riback-Wilson (born August 24, 1946) is a former American Democrat politician who served in the Missouri House of Representatives.

Born in Columbia, Missouri, she graduated from the University of Pennsylvania with a bachelor's degree in English and from the University of Missouri with a master's degree in higher and adult education. She served as a Peace Corps volunteer in Uganda.

Vicky Riback-Wilson served as a coordinator for the University of Missouri's Fellowships Office, as assistant director of the Missouri Cultural Heritage Center, and as associate director of the Missouri Rural Innovation Institute.
