= Clint Zweifel =

American politician (born 1973)

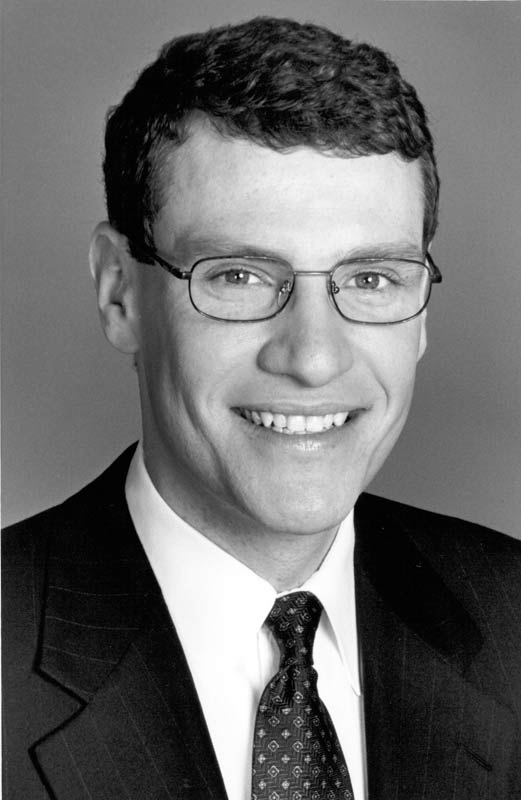

45th Treasurer of Missouri
- In office January 12, 2009 – January 9, 2017
- Governor: Jay Nixon
- Preceded by: Sarah Steelman
- Succeeded by: Eric Schmitt

Personal details
- Born: November 3, 1973 (age 52) St. Louis, Missouri, U.S.
- Party: Democratic
- Spouse: Janice Smith
- Children: 2
- Education: University of Missouri–St. Louis (BA, MBA)

Clint Zweifel (born November 3, 1973), is an American politician and businessman who served as the state treasurer of Missouri from 2009 to 2017. He is a member of the Democratic Party and the most recent member of the party to hold that office. Following his service as treasurer, he was appointed as a managing director with Northern Trust, leading a multi-disciplinary team that includes banking, investment management, and trust/advisory services.

== Early life and career ==
Zweifel was born in St. Louis, Missouri, and grew up in the surrounding communities of St. Louis County, Missouri, attending grade school in Florissant and Hazelwood West High School in Hazelwood.

The first member of his family to attend and graduate from college, he earned both a Bachelor of Arts degree in political science and an MBA from the University of Missouri-St. Louis. Prior to running for public office, Zweifel was the research and education director for the Teamsters Local 688, where one of his chief responsibilities was advising union members nearing retirement on their personal finances. Eisenhower Fellowships selected Zweifel as a USA Eisenhower Fellow in 2009.

== Family ==
Zweifel's wife, Janice, owns a business in St. Louis. They are the parents of two daughters, Selma and Ellie.

== Political career ==
Zweifel represented the 78th District in the Missouri House of Representatives. He first won election to the House of Representatives in 2002 by a 67-vote margin and earned the distinction of being the only Democrat in the state to defeat a Republican incumbent in that election year.

Zweifel served three terms in the House. He led Democratic policy strategy and developed solutions to help Missouri families, developing proposals on early childhood education, helping seniors cope with property taxes, and guarding citizen privacy. He was the ranking member on the Ways and Means Committee and the Special Committee on Tax Reform. He served on the Special Committee on Retirement, the Joint Committee on Tax Policy, and the Special Committee on State Parks and Waterways.

He chaired the Missouri House Democratic Campaign Committee during the 2006 election cycle, leading all Missouri House candidate recruitment and fundraising efforts for the Democratic Party. The effort resulted in the largest Democratic net gain in the House since the 1978 elections.

In the 2008 election cycle, Zweifel won the Democratic primary for state treasurer, topping a four-candidate field which included 2004 nominee and Arnold, Missouri Mayor Mark Powell, former state Department of Economic Development official Andria Danine Simckes and former Kansas City Mayor Charles Wheeler. He went on to defeat Republican State Senator Brad Lager in the general election. He is the youngest person elected to that office in over a century, celebrating his 35th birthday the day before his election.

Zweifel was re-elected as state treasurer in the 2012 election, defeating Republican Cole McNary and Libertarian Sean O'Toole. Zweifel was ineligible to seek reelection as state treasurer in 2016, and announced that he would not run for any other political office that year.

== State treasurer ==
As state treasurer, Zweifel managed a 50-member team that invested $3.5 billion in assets on behalf of Missourians. He led the state's banking system while spearheading work on retirement security, small business, college savings, military installations and housing, while maintaining the state's AAA credit rating. He served two terms as state treasurer, winning election in 2008 and reelection in 2012.

=== Political positions ===
Retirement security

As state treasurer, Zweifel served as an ex-officio member of the Missouri State Employees' Retirement System, which administers retirement, life insurance, and long-term disability benefits for state employees. His focus on retirement policy and advocacy resulted in legislation banning the predatory practice known as "pension advances" for Missouri public pensioners.

Zweifel pursued policy to ensure sound financial stewardship of public funds. He worked with a national bipartisan coalition of state and local treasurers and comptrollers to set clearer guardrails around investing public funds. He joined his counterparts around the country to call on the U.S. Securities and Exchange Commission to establish consistent standards around fees and expenses associated with private equity for public funds. It was an important step toward transparency and enhanced financial stewardship of public funds on behalf of Missouri consumers.

Addressing homelessness

Zweifel served on the Missouri Housing Development Commission through which he passed a housing plan of more than $120 million to combat homelessness in the state. The proposal represented the largest commitment to affordable housing in Missouri's history, including for thousands of veterans, school-age children and those suffering from mental health issues. The plan recalibrated Missouri's housing tax credit program to focus directly on developing affordable housing, dramatically enhancing the program's efficiency and cost effectiveness. while refocusing resources for vulnerable populations.

Small business

By working with Missouri lenders and small businesses, Zweifel expanded the Missouri Linked Deposit Program, which makes low-interest loans to Missouri small businesses. He secured an additional $400 million in lending power during his time in office to bolster small businesses around the state.

In 2014, Zweifel leveraged hisrelationships with the Missouri banking community to quickly establish a Small Business Relief Fund for Ferguson-area businesses that were affected by unrest in that community.

MOST 529

Zweifel oversaw MOST, Missouri's 529 college savings program, and lowered fees by as much as 80 percent during his time in office, cutting costs for savers and making higher education more accessible for thousands. He regularly traveled the state to speak with students about the importance of financial literacy and starting to save early.

== Electoral history ==
2002 race for Missouri House of Representatives 78th District
Party	Candidate	Votes	%	±
Democratic	Clint Zweifel	6,043	50.3	
Republican	Michael Reid (incumbent)	5,976	49.7	

2004 race for Missouri House of Representatives 78th District
Party	Candidate	Votes	%	±
Democratic	Clint Zweifel (incumbent)	10,938	69.5	
Republican	Roseanne Vrugtman	4,793	30.5	

2006 race for Missouri House of Representatives 78th District
Party	Candidate	Votes	%	±
Democratic	Clint Zweifel (incumbent)	9,632	100.0	

2008 Democratic primary for state treasurer of Missouri
Party	Candidate	Votes	%	±
Democratic	Clint Zweifel	103,408	31.8	
Democratic	Mark Powell	92,938	28.6	
Democratic	Andria Danine Simckes	70,566	21.7	
Democratic	Charles Wheeler	58,562	18.0	

2008 race for state treasurer of Missouri
Party	Candidate	Votes	%	±%
Democratic	Clint Zweifel	1,394,627	50.47	
Republican	Brad Lager	1,302,625	47.14	
Constitution	Rodney D. Farthing	66,062	2.39	

2012 race for state treasurer of Missouri
Party	Candidate	Votes	%	±%
Democratic	Clint Zweifel (incumbent)	1,332,876	50.4	
Republican	Cole McNary	1,200,368	45.4	
Libertarian	Sean O'Toole	109,188	4.1	

== Awards and honors ==
=== Rodel Fellow ===
Honor date: January 2012

Honor issuer: Aspen Institute

=== Delegate to the American-German Young Leaders Conference ===
Honor date: July 2009

Honor issuer: American Council on Germany

Honor description: Served on a 12-member educational delegation to Germany. Traveled to Munich and Berlin to discuss transatlantic cooperation on economic and security issues.

=== Delegate to the Republic of Korea ===
Honor date: August 2005

Honor issuer: American Council of Young Political Leaders

Honor description: Served on a nine-member, bi-partisan, political study tour to South Korea. Traveled to Seoul and Daegu, South Korea. Met with government and global business leaders and participated in U.S. Department of State and Embassy briefings.

Party political offices
Preceded by Mark Powell	Democratic nominee for State Treasurer of Missouri; 2008, 2012	Succeeded by Judy Baker
Political offices
Preceded by Sarah Steelman	Treasurer of Missouri; 2009–2017	Succeeded by Eric Schmitt
