= Cole McNary =

American politician

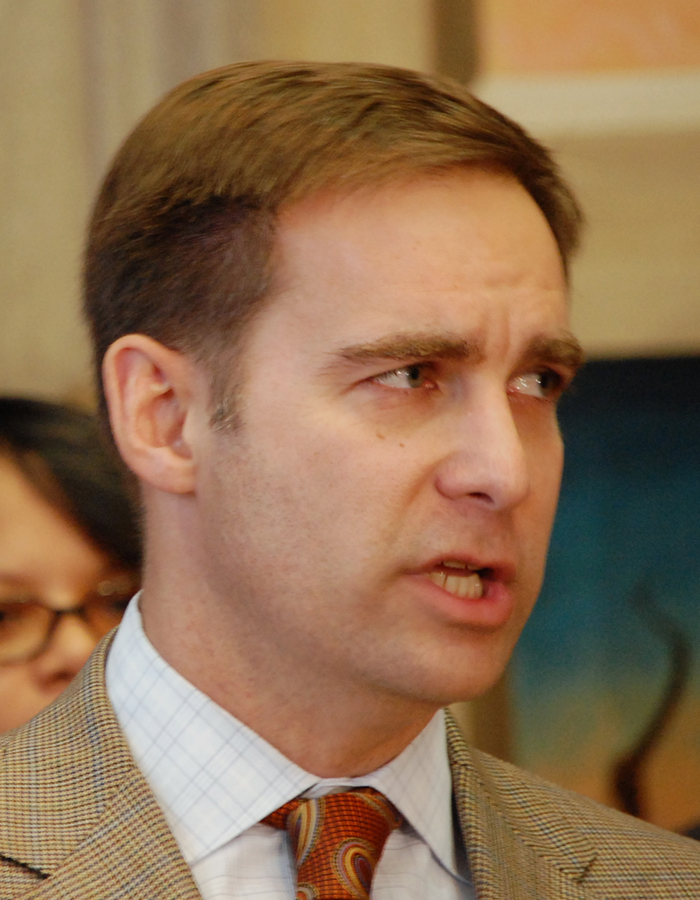

Member of the Missouri House of Representatives from the 86th district
- In office 2009–2013
- Preceded by: Jane Cunningham
- Succeeded by: Rory Ellinger

Personal details
- Born: July 10, 1964 (age 62)
- Party: Republican
- Spouse: Christy
- Children: Shannon; Courtney; Mitchell
- Education: Auburn University; St. Louis University
- Occupation: Teacher
- Website: Campaign Website

Cole McNary (born July 10, 1964) is an American educator and a former Republican member of the Missouri House of Representatives. He represented the 86th district, which includes Chesterfield from 2009 to 2013. He was the Republican nominee for Missouri State Treasurer in the 2012 election. He subsequently ran for the Monarch Fire Board.

== Early life and career ==
Cole McNary is the son of Gene McNary, the former Commissioner of the Immigration and Naturalization Service, Executive Director of the Missouri Gaming Commission, and County Executive of St. Louis County. His mother is Ina Risch McNary Tornallyay.

The younger McNary attended Lindbergh High School in St. Louis County. He then obtained a bachelor's degree in Aviation Management from Auburn University and a Master of Business Administration from St. Louis University. He worked with business analysis and sales before getting a Teaching Certificate in Physics from The University of Missouri-St. Louis and becoming a teacher. Before becoming a State Rep. he worked for St. John Vianney High School where he taught mathematics and physics. McNary met his wife, Christy, while campaigning for his father. They have three children and attend United Methodist Church of Green Trails in Chesterfield.

== Political career ==
In 2008, McNary ran for the Missouri House of Representatives. He defeated five opponents in the Republican primary, winning with 48.5 percent of the vote. McNary then went on to win the general election against Martha "Marty" Ott, with 57.94% of the vote. In 2010, he won reelection without opposition. He was one of thirty-nine state legislators to sign a no new taxes pledge. After redistricting drew incumbent Missouri State Representatives John Diehl and Rick Stream into the same district as McNary, McNary declared his intention to run for State Treasurer of Missouri in 2012. A large part of his campaign was his experience as chairman of the downsizing state government committee in the state house. He won the Republican nomination but lost in the general election to incumbent Democrat Clint Zweifel.

== Electoral history ==
2012 Race for State Treasurer of Missouri
Party	Candidate	Votes	%	±%
Democratic	Clint Zweifel	1,332,876	50.4	
Republican	Cole McNary	1,200,368	45.4	
Libertarian	Sean O'Toole	109,188	4.1	

2010 General Election for Missouri’s 86th District House of Representatives
Party	Candidate	Votes	%	±%
Republican	Cole McNary	11,809	98.20	

2008 General Election for Missouri’s 86th District House of Representatives
Party	Candidate	Votes	%	±%
Republican	Cole McNary	11,691	57.94	
Democratic	Martha "Marty" Ott	8,478	42.01	

Party political offices
Preceded by Brad Lager	Republican nominee for State Treasurer of Missouri; 2012	Succeeded by Eric Schmitt
