= 2008 United States House of Representatives elections in Missouri =

- November 4, 2008

All 9 Missouri seats to the United States House of Representatives
	Majority party	Minority party
Party	Republican	Democratic
Last election	5	4
Seats won	5	4
Seat change	Steady	Steady
Popular vote	1,313,018	1,413,016
Percentage	46.54%	50.08%
Swing	▼3.49%	▲2.77%

Republican
40–50%
50–60%
60–70%
70–80%
80–90%
>90%
Democratic
40–50%
50–60%
60–70%
70–80%
80–90%
>90%
Tie/No Data

The 2008 congressional elections in Missouri were held on November 4, 2008, to determine who will represent the state of Missouri in the United States House of Representatives. The primary election for candidates seeking the nomination of the Republican Party, the Democratic Party, and the Libertarian Party was held on August 5.

Missouri has nine seats in the House, apportioned according to the 2000 United States census. Representatives are elected for two-year terms; those elected will serve in the 111th Congress from January 3, 2009, until January 3, 2011. The election coincided with the 2008 U.S. presidential election. The races not forecasted as safe for the incumbent party were 6 and 9; however, the Republicans held both seats.

Missouri was the only state in which the party that won the state's popular vote did not win a majority of seats in 2008. It was also the last time the Democrats won the House popular vote in Missouri.

== Overview ==
United States House of Representatives elections in Missouri, 2008
Party	Votes	Percentage	Seats	+/–
Democratic	1,413,016	50.08%	4	—
Republican	1,313,018	46.54%	5	—
Libertarian	82,647	2.93%	0	-
Constitution	12,747	0.45%	0	-
Independents	56	<0.01%	0	—
Totals	2,821,484	100.00%	9	—

== District 1 ==
2008 Missouri's 1st congressional district election
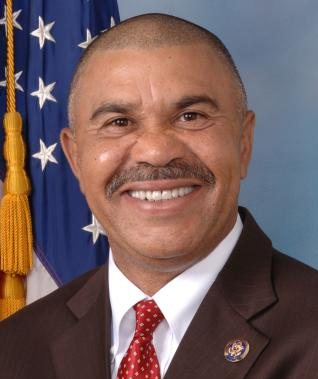

Nominee	Lacy Clay	Robb E. Cunningham
Party	Democratic	Libertarian
Popular vote	242,570	36,700
Percentage	86.9%	13.1%
- County results Clay: 80–90% 90–100%
U.S. Representative before election
Lacy Clay
Democratic
Elected U.S. Representative
Lacy Clay
Democratic

Incumbent Democratic Congressman William Lacy Clay Jr. easily dispatched with Libertarian challenger Robb Cunningham in this St. Louis-based liberal district.

=== Democratic primary results ===
Democratic primary results
Party	Candidate	Votes	%
Democratic	William Lacy Clay Jr. (inc.)	41,517	100.0
Total votes		41,517	100.0

=== Libertarian primary results ===
Libertarian primary results
Party	Candidate	Votes	%
Libertarian	Robb E. Cunningham	130	100.0
Total votes		130	100.0

==== Predictions ====
Source	Ranking	As of
The Cook Political Report	Safe D	November 6, 2008
Rothenberg	Safe D	November 2, 2008
Sabato's Crystal Ball	Safe D	November 6, 2008
Real Clear Politics	Safe D	November 7, 2008
CQ Politics	Safe D	November 6, 2008

Missouri's 1st congressional district election, 2008
Party	Candidate	Votes	%
Democratic	William Lacy Clay, Jr. (inc.)	242,570	86.9
Libertarian	Robb E. Cunningham	36,700	13.1
Write-ins		7	0.0
Total votes		279,277	100.0
Democratic hold			

== District 2 ==
2008 Missouri's 2nd congressional district election
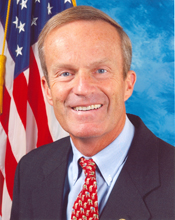

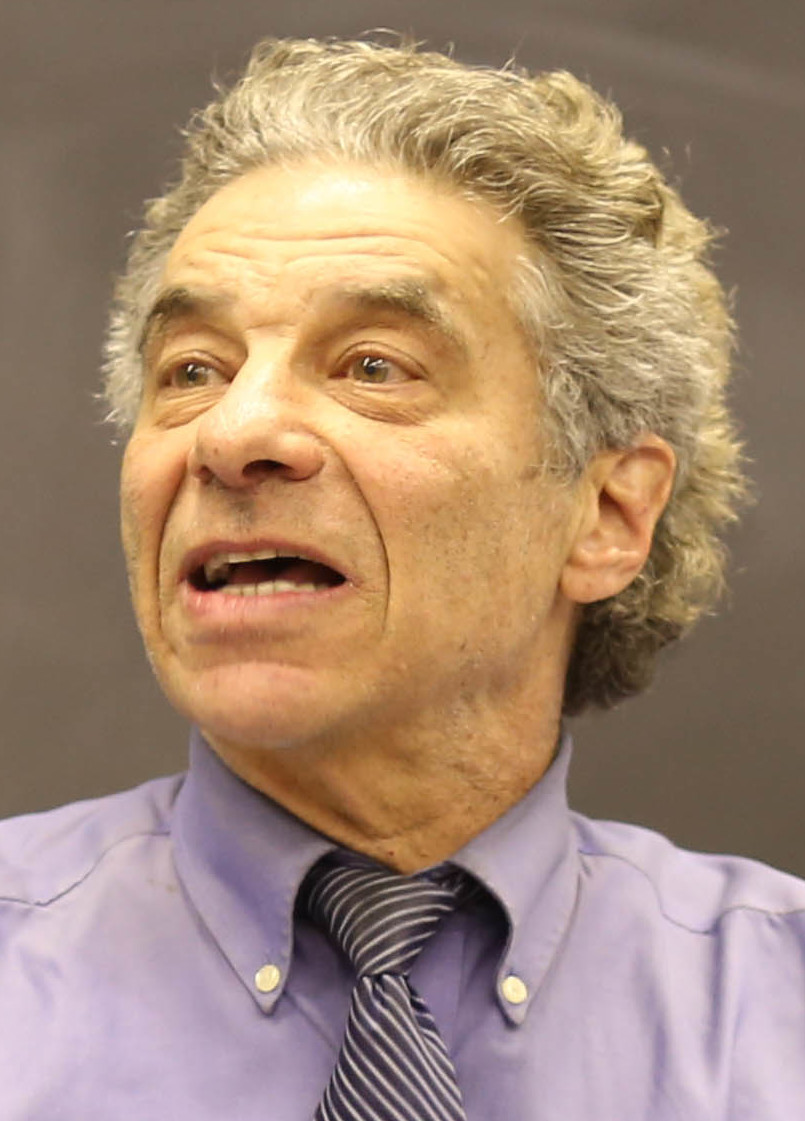
Nominee	Todd Akin	Bill Haas
Party	Republican	Democratic
Popular vote	232,276	132,068
Percentage	62.3%	35.4%
- County results Akin: 50–60% 60–70%
U.S. Representative before election
Todd Akin
Republican
Elected U.S. Representative
Todd Akin
Republican

Incumbent Republican Congressman Todd Akin easily won re-election to a fifth term over Democratic nominee Bill Haas and Libertarian candidate Thomas Knapp in this conservative district rooted in the northern and western suburbs of St. Louis.

=== Democratic primary results ===
Democratic primary results
Party	Candidate	Votes	%
Democratic	Bill Haas	9,018	30.7
Democratic	David L. Pentland	6,007	20.5
Democratic	Byron DeLear	5,059	17.2
Democratic	Mike Garman	4,690	16.0
Democratic	John Hogan	4,557	15.5
Total votes		29,331	100.0

=== Libertarian primary results ===
Libertarian primary results
Party	Candidate	Votes	%
Libertarian	Thomas L. Knapp	211	100.0
Total votes		211	100.0

==== Predictions ====
Source	Ranking	As of
The Cook Political Report	Safe R	November 6, 2008
Rothenberg	Safe R	November 2, 2008
Sabato's Crystal Ball	Safe R	November 6, 2008
Real Clear Politics	Safe R	November 7, 2008
CQ Politics	Safe R	November 6, 2008

Missouri's 2nd congressional district election, 2008
Party	Candidate	Votes	%
Republican	Todd Akin (inc.)	232,276	62.3
Democratic	Bill Haas	132,068	35.4
Libertarian	Thomas L. Knapp	8,628	2.3
Total votes		372,972	100.0
Republican hold			

== District 3 ==
2008 Missouri's 3rd congressional district election
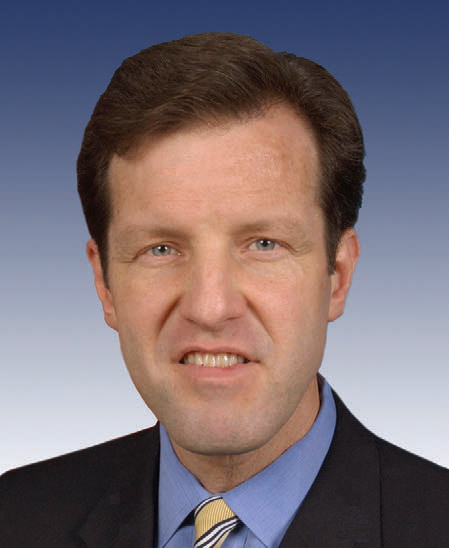

Nominee	Russ Carnahan	Chris Sander
Party	Democratic	Republican
Popular vote	202,470	92,759
Percentage	66.4%	30.4%
- County results Carnahan: 60–70% 70–80%
U.S. Representative before election
Russ Carnahan
Democratic
Elected U.S. Representative
Russ Carnahan
Democratic

In this fairly liberal district based in the southern portion of St. Louis and previously represented by House Minority Leader Dick Gephardt, Democratic Congressman Russ Carnahan easily defeated Republican Chris Sander, Libertarian Kevin Babcock, and Constitution Party candidate Cindy Redburn to win a third term.

=== Democratic primary results ===
Democratic primary results
Party	Candidate	Votes	%
Democratic	Russ Carnahan (inc.)	38,020	100.0
Total votes		38,020	100.0

=== Republican primary results ===
Republican primary results
Party	Candidate	Votes	%
Republican	Chris Sander	7,923	41.7
Republican	John Wayne Tucker	5,963	31.4
Republican	Greg Zotta	2,532	13.6
Republican	Pat Ertmann	2,532	13.3
Total votes		18,994	100.0

=== Libertarian primary results ===
Libertarian primary results
Party	Candidate	Votes	%
Libertarian	Kevin C. Babcock	224	100.0
Total votes		224	100.0

==== Predictions ====
Source	Ranking	As of
The Cook Political Report	Safe D	November 6, 2008
Rothenberg	Safe D	November 2, 2008
Sabato's Crystal Ball	Safe D	November 6, 2008
Real Clear Politics	Safe D	November 7, 2008
CQ Politics	Safe D	November 6, 2008

Missouri's 3rd congressional district election, 2008
Party	Candidate	Votes	%
Democratic	Russ Carnahan (inc.)	202,470	66.4
Republican	Chris Sander	92,759	30.4
Libertarian	Kevin C. Babcock	5,518	1.8
Constitution	Cindy Redburn	4,324	1.4
Total votes		305,071	100.0
Democratic hold			

== District 4 ==
2008 Missouri's 4th congressional district election
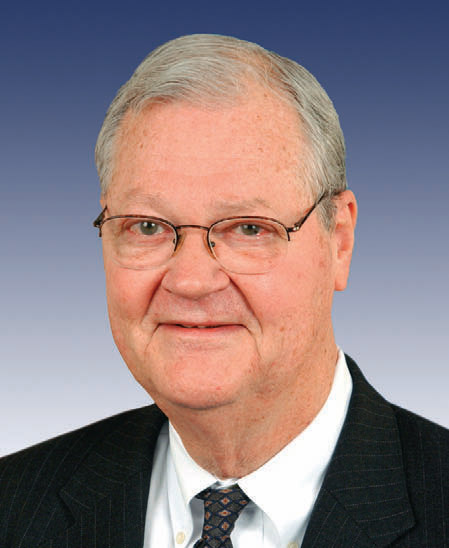

Nominee	Ike Skelton	Jeff Parnell
Party	Democratic	Republican
Popular vote	200,009	103,446
Percentage	65.9%	34.1%
- Skelton: 50–60% 60–70% 70–80% 80–90% Parnell: 50–60% 60–70% 70–80% 50% No votes
U.S. Representative before election
Ike Skelton
Democratic
Elected U.S. Representative
Ike Skelton
Democratic

Long-serving incumbent Democratic Congressman Ike Skelton, the Chairman of the House Armed Services Committee, easily defeated Republican nominee Jeff Parnell in this conservative, west-central Missouri district to win a seventeenth term. By contrast, in the simultaneous 2008 presidential election the district gave 61 percent of its vote to Republican nominee John McCain and 38 percent to Democratic nominee Barack Obama, making this the only Missouri district with opposite results in the two elections.

=== Democratic primary results ===
Democratic primary results
Party	Candidate	Votes	%
Democratic	Ike Skelton (inc.)	37,111	100.0
Total votes		37,111	100.0

=== Republican primary results ===
Republican primary results
Party	Candidate	Votes	%
Republican	Jeff Parnell	31,979	66.8
Republican	Stanley Plough, Jr.	10,324	21.6
Republican	Joseph Terrazas	5,568	11.6
Total votes		47,871	100.0

==== Predictions ====
Source	Ranking	As of
The Cook Political Report	Safe D	November 6, 2008
Rothenberg	Safe D	November 2, 2008
Sabato's Crystal Ball	Safe D	November 6, 2008
Real Clear Politics	Safe D	November 7, 2008
CQ Politics	Safe D	November 6, 2008

Missouri's 4th congressional district election, 2008
Party	Candidate	Votes	%
Democratic	Ike Skelton (inc.)	200,009	65.9
Republican	Jeff Parnell	103,446	34.1
Total votes		303,455	100.0
Democratic hold			

== District 5 ==
2008 Missouri's 5th congressional district election
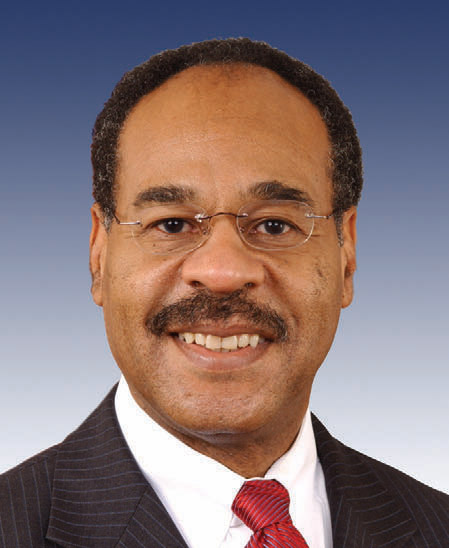

Nominee	Emanuel Cleaver	Jacob Turk
Party	Democratic	Republican
Popular vote	197,249	109,166
Percentage	64.4%	35.6%
- County results Cleaver: 50–60% 70–80% Turk: 50–60%
U.S. Representative before election
Emanuel Cleaver
Democratic
Elected U.S. Representative
Emanuel Cleaver
Democratic

Democratic incumbent Congressman Emanuel Cleaver defeated Republican nominee Jacob Turk to win a third term in this fairly liberal district based in Kansas City.

=== Democratic primary results ===
Democratic primary results
Party	Candidate	Votes	%
Democratic	Emanuel Cleaver (inc.)	38,260	100.0
Total votes		38,260	100.0

=== Republican primary results ===
Republican primary results
Party	Candidate	Votes	%
Republican	Jacob Turk	9,294	54.2
Republican	Chris Knowlton	3,552	20.7
Republican	Martin D. Baker	2,647	15.4
Republican	Randy Langkraehr	1,641	9.6
Total votes		17,134	100.0

==== Predictions ====
Source	Ranking	As of
The Cook Political Report	Safe D	November 6, 2008
Rothenberg	Safe D	November 2, 2008
Sabato's Crystal Ball	Safe D	November 6, 2008
Real Clear Politics	Safe D	November 7, 2008
CQ Politics	Safe D	November 6, 2008

Missouri's 5th congressional district election, 2008
Party	Candidate	Votes	%
Democratic	Emanuel Cleaver (inc.)	197,249	64.4
Republican	Jacob Turk	109,166	35.6
Total votes		306,415	100.0
Democratic hold			

== District 6 ==
2008 Missouri's 6th congressional district election
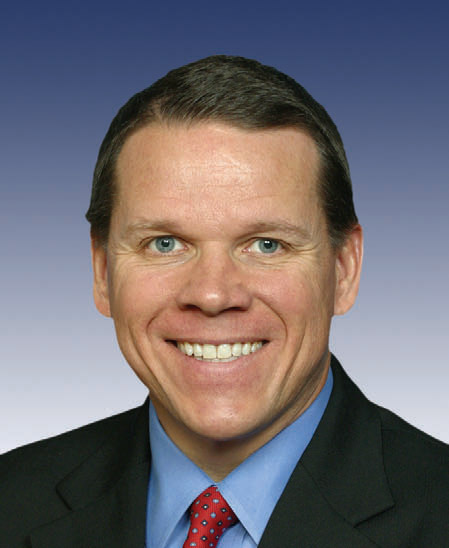

Nominee	Sam Graves	Kay Barnes
Party	Republican	Democratic
Popular vote	196,526	121,894
Percentage	59.4%	36.9%
- County results Graves: 50–60% 60–70% 70–80%
U.S. Representative before election
Sam Graves
Republican
Elected U.S. Representative
Sam Graves
Republican

Incumbent Republican Congressman Sam Graves survived a high-profile challenge from Democratic nominee and former Kansas City Mayor Kay Barnes by a much healthier margin than expected. Barnes' inability to capitalize on the strong Democratic wave sweeping the country ultimately left her defeated in this normally conservative district based in northwest Missouri.

=== Republican primary results ===
Republican primary results
Party	Candidate	Votes	%
Republican	Sam Graves (inc.)	36,131	100.0
Total votes		36,131	100.0

=== Democratic primary results ===
Democratic primary results
Party	Candidate	Votes	%
Democratic	Kay Barnes	36,712	84.5
Democratic	Ali Allon Sherkat	6,714	15.5
Total votes		43,426	100.0

=== Libertarian primary results ===
Libertarian primary results
Party	Candidate	Votes	%
Libertarian	Dave Browning	225	100.0
Total votes		225	100.0

==== Predictions ====
Source	Ranking	As of
The Cook Political Report	Lean R	November 6, 2008
Rothenberg	Safe R	November 2, 2008
Sabato's Crystal Ball	Lean R	November 6, 2008
Real Clear Politics	Lean R	November 7, 2008
CQ Politics	Lean R	November 6, 2008

Missouri's 6th congressional district election, 2008
Party	Candidate	Votes	%
Republican	Sam Graves (inc.)	196,526	59.4
Democratic	Kay Barnes	121,894	36.9
Libertarian	Dave Browning	12,279	3.7
Total votes		330,699	100.0
Republican hold			

== District 7 ==
2008 Missouri's 7th congressional district election
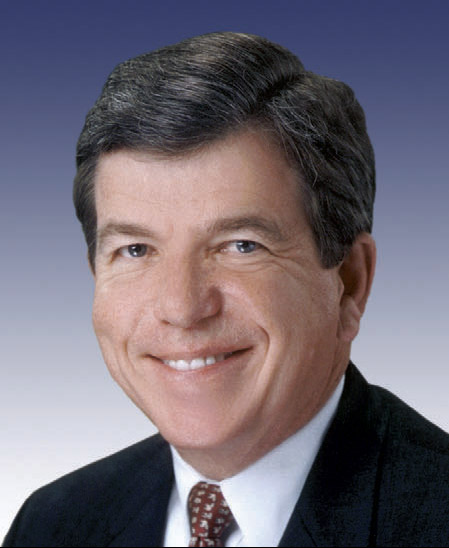

Nominee	Roy Blunt	Richard Monroe
Party	Republican	Democratic
Popular vote	219,016	91,010
Percentage	67.8%	28.2%
- County results Blunt: 60–70% 70–80%
U.S. Representative before election
Roy Blunt
Republican
Elected U.S. Representative
Roy Blunt
Republican

Incumbent Republican Congressman Roy Blunt, a former short-serving House Majority Leader defeated Democrat Richard Monroe, Libertarian Kevin Craig, and Constitution candidate Travis Maddox to easily win another term in office.

=== Republican primary results ===
Republican primary results
Party	Candidate	Votes	%
Republican	Roy Blunt (inc.)	64,767	100.0
Total votes		64,767	100.0

=== Democratic primary results ===
Democratic primary results
Party	Candidate	Votes	%
Democratic	Richard Monroe	11,973	77.7
Democratic	Gregory L. Gloeckner	3,493	22.3
Total votes		15,466	100.0

=== Libertarian primary results ===
Libertarian primary results
Party	Candidate	Votes	%
Libertarian	Kevin Craig	199	100.0
Total votes		199	100.0

==== Predictions ====
Source	Ranking	As of
The Cook Political Report	Safe R	November 6, 2008
Rothenberg	Safe R	November 2, 2008
Sabato's Crystal Ball	Safe R	November 6, 2008
Real Clear Politics	Safe R	November 7, 2008
CQ Politics	Safe R	November 6, 2008

Missouri's 7th congressional district election, 2008
Party	Candidate	Votes	%
Republican	Roy Blunt (inc.)	219,016	67.8
Democratic	Richard Monroe	91,010	28.2
Libertarian	Kevin Craig	6,971	2.2
Constitution	Travis Maddox	6,166	1.9
Write-ins		49	0.0
Total votes		323,212	100.00
Republican hold			

== District 8 ==
2008 Missouri's 8th congressional district election
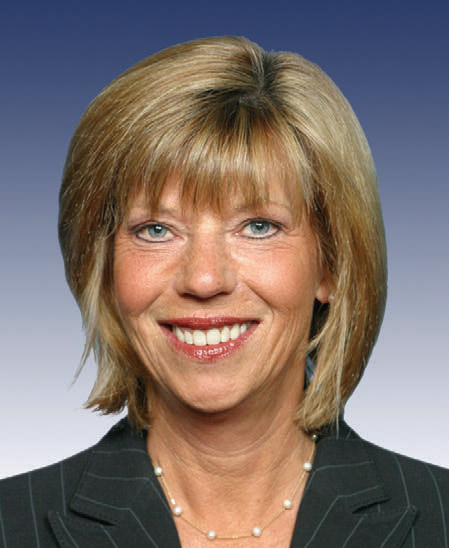

Nominee	Jo Ann Emerson	Joe Allen
Party	Republican	Democratic
Popular vote	198,798	72,790
Percentage	71.4%	26.2%
- County results Emerson: 60–70% 70–80% 80–90%
U.S. Representative before election
Jo Ann Emerson
Republican
Elected U.S. Representative
Jo Ann Emerson
Republican

Incumbent Republican Congresswoman Jo Ann Emerson faced little difficulty against Democrat Joe Allen, Libertarian Branden McCullough, and Constitution candidate Richard Smith to win another term in office.

=== Republican primary results ===
Republican primary results
Party	Candidate	Votes	%
Republican	Jo Ann Emerson (inc.)	51,801	100.0
Total votes		51,801	100.0

=== Democratic primary results ===
Democratic primary results
Party	Candidate	Votes	%
Democratic	Joe Allen	35,418	100.0
Total votes		35,418	100.0

=== Libertarian primary results ===
Libertarian primary results
Party	Candidate	Votes	%
Libertarian	Branden C. McCollough	126	100.0
Total votes		126	100.0

==== Predictions ====
Source	Ranking	As of
The Cook Political Report	Safe R	November 6, 2008
Rothenberg	Safe R	November 2, 2008
Sabato's Crystal Ball	Safe R	November 6, 2008
Real Clear Politics	Safe R	November 7, 2008
CQ Politics	Safe R	November 6, 2008

Missouri's 8th congressional district election, 2008
Party	Candidate	Votes	%
Republican	Jo Ann Emerson (inc.)	198,798	71.4
Democratic	Joe Allen	72,790	26.2
Libertarian	Branden C. McCullough	4,443	1.6
Constitution	Richard L. Smith	2,257	0.8
Total votes		278,288	100.0
Republican hold			

== District 9 ==
2008 Missouri's 9th congressional district election
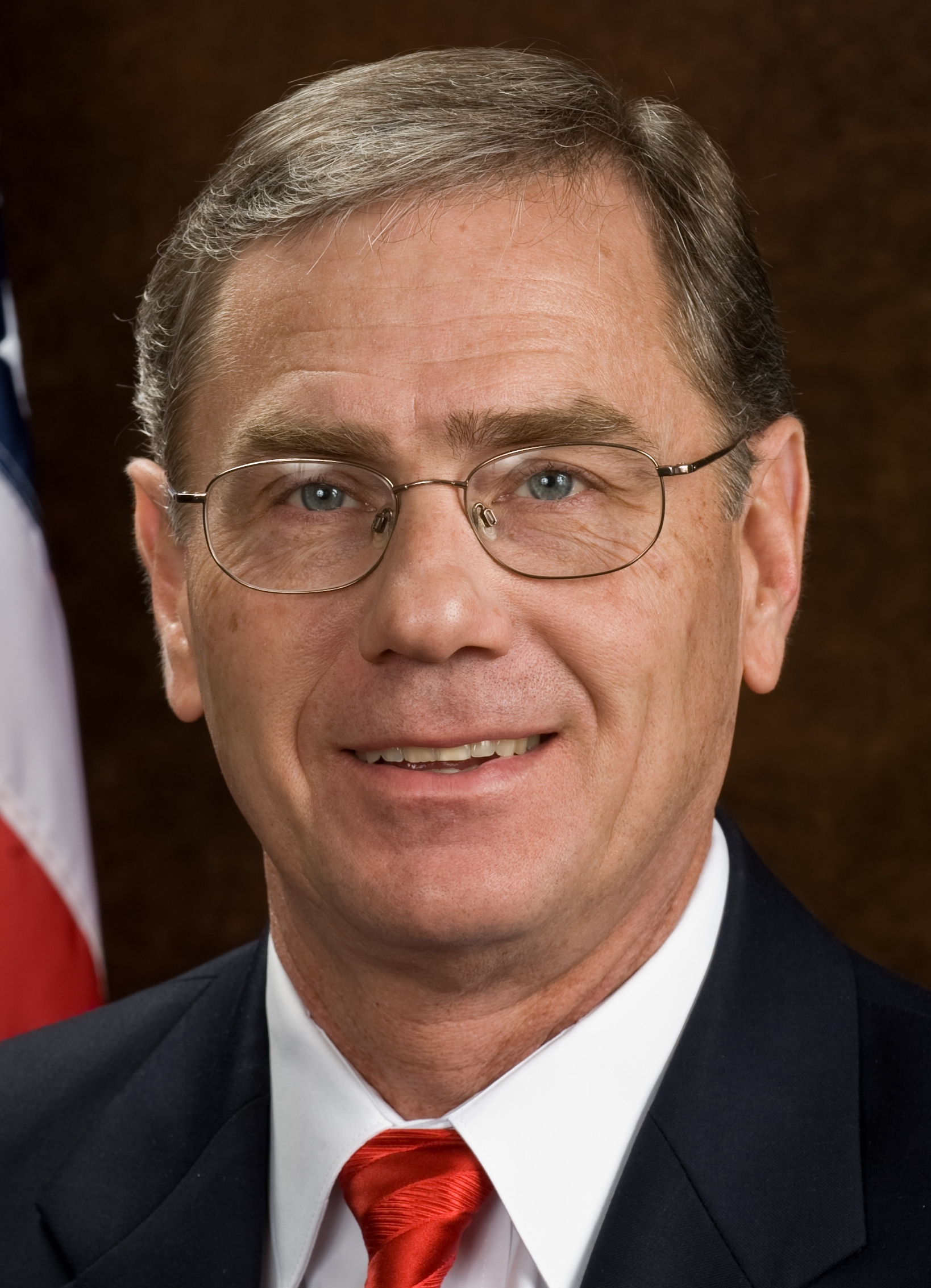

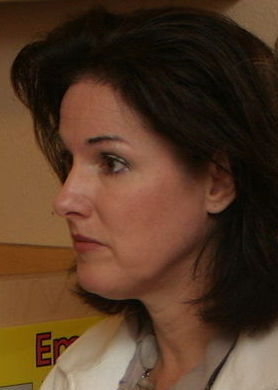
Nominee	Blaine Luetkemeyer	Judy Baker
Party	Republican	Democratic
Popular vote	161,031	152,956
Percentage	50.0%	47.5%
- County results Luetkemeyer: 40–50% 50–60% 60–70% Baker: 40–50% 50–60%
U.S. Representative before election
Kenny Hulshof
Republican
Elected U.S. Representative
Blaine Luetkemeyer
Republican

When Republican Congressman Kenny Hulshof declined to seek another term in favor of running for Governor, an open seat emerged. Former Missouri State Representative Blaine Luetkemeyer, the Republican nominee, defeated Democratic nominee Judy Baker, a member of the Missouri House of Representatives by a thin margin in this normally conservative district based in northeast Missouri, a part of "Little Dixie."

=== Republican primary results ===
Republican primary results
Party	Candidate	Votes	%
Republican	Blaine Luetkemeyer	21,543	39.7
Republican	Bob Onder	15,572	29.0
Republican	Danielle Moore	10,609	19.5
Republican	Brock Olivo	5,501	10.1
Republican	Dan Bishir	890	1.6
Total votes		54,295	100.0

=== Democratic primary results ===
Democratic primary results
Party	Candidate	Votes	%
Democratic	Judy Baker	22,498	44.1
Democratic	Steve Gaw	15,864	31.1
Democratic	Lyndon Bode	6,565	12.9
Democratic	Ken Jacob	6,060	11.9
Total votes		54,295	100.0

=== Libertarian primary results ===
Libertarian primary results
Party	Candidate	Votes	%
Libertarian	Tamara A. Millay	250	100.0
Total votes		250	100.0

==== Predictions ====
Source	Ranking	As of
The Cook Political Report	Tossup	November 6, 2008
Rothenberg	Tilt R	November 2, 2008
Sabato's Crystal Ball	Lean R	November 6, 2008
Real Clear Politics	Lean R	November 7, 2008
CQ Politics	Lean R	November 6, 2008

Missouri's 9th congressional district election, 2008
Party	Candidate	Votes	%
Republican	Blaine Luetkemeyer	161,031	50.0
Democratic	Judy Baker	152,956	47.5
Libertarian	Tamara A. Millay	8,108	2.5
Total votes		322,095	100.0
Republican hold			
