= List of bridges documented by the Historic American Engineering Record in Missouri =

This is a list of bridges documented by the Historic American Engineering Record in the U.S. state of Missouri.

== Bridges ==
Survey No.	Name (as assigned by HAER)	Status	Type	Built	Documented	Carries	Crosses	Location	County	Coordinates
IL-21	Alton Bridge (Note: See also HAER No. NE-2, "Nebraska City Bridge" for additional documentation)	Demolished	Swing span	1894	1985	Former Alton Railroad	Mississippi River	West Alton, Missouri, and Alton, Illinois	St. Charles County, Missouri, and Madison County, Illinois	38°52′53″N 90°11′09″W
KS-6	Leavenworth Bridge	Demolished	Swing span	1894	1985	Leavenworth Terminal Railway	Missouri River	East Leavenworth, Missouri, and Leavenworth, Kansas	Platte County, Missouri, and Leavenworth County, Kansas	39°19′02″N 94°54′24″W
MO-2	Armour, Swift, Burlington Bridge	Extant	Vertical-lift bridge	1911	1981	Chicago, Burlington and Quincy Railroad	Missouri River	Kansas City and North Kansas City	Jackson and Clay	39°06′59″N 94°34′47″W
MO-3	Middle Bridge	Demolished	Suspension	1913	1982	Warsaw-Whitakerville Road	Osage River	Warsaw	Benton	38°13′58″N 93°22′30″W
MO-4	Surprise School Bridge		Pratt truss		1978		South Grand River	Gaines	Henry	
MO-5	Lime Kiln Road Bridge	Bypassed	Pratt truss	1882	197?	Lime Kiln Road	Shoal Creek	Neosho	Newton	36°53′43″N 94°22′10″W
MO-7	Paradise Road Bridge	Demolished	Pratt truss	1896	1979	Paradise Road	Little Platte River	Paradise	Clay	39°26′05″N 94°32′03″W
MO-8	Waddell "A" Truss Bridge	Relocated	King post truss	1898	1980	English Landing Park trail	Rush Creek	Parkville	Platte	39°11′9″N 94°40′56″W
MO-10	Eighteenth Street Bridge	Replaced	Parker truss	1910	1984	18th Street	Terminal Railroad	St. Louis	Independent city	38°37′26″N 90°12′29″W
MO-11	Twenty-first Street Bridge	Demolished	Parker truss	1892	1984	21st Street	Terminal Railroad	St. Louis	Independent city	38°37′27″N 90°12′45″W
MO-12	Eads Bridge	Extant	Steel arch	1874	1983	Washington Avenue	Mississippi River	St. Louis, Missouri, and East St. Louis, Illinois	Independent city and St. Clair County, Illinois	38°37′44″N 90°10′44″W
MO-15	Roscoe Bridge	Demolished	Pennsylvania truss		1978	Route E	Osage River	Roscoe	St. Clair	37°59′15″N 93°48′48″W
MO-16	Osceola Bridge	Demolished	Pratt truss		1978		Osage River	Osceola	St. Clair	
MO-17	Osage River Bridge	Replaced	Reinforced concrete open-spandrel arch		1978	Route 13	Osage River	Osceola	St. Clair	38°03′42″N 93°41′37″W
MO-18	Warsaw Bridge	Bypassed	Suspension	1928	1978	Route 7	Osage River	Warsaw	Benton	38°14′39″N 93°23′16″W
MO-19	Bryan's Crossing Bridge	Demolished	Suspension		1978		South Grand River	Warsaw	Benton	
MO-20	William's Bend Bridge	Extant	Pratt truss		1978		Pomme de Terre River	Hermitage	Hickory	37°55′13″N 93°19′43″W
MO-21	Steel Truss Bridge	Demolished	Cantilever		1978	Route 7	Osage River	Fairfield	Benton	
MO-25	American Mill Bridge	Replaced	Pratt truss	1886	1985		Center Creek	Carthage	Jasper	37°07′07″N 94°15′29″W
MO-26	Bellefontaine Bridge	Extant	Baltimore truss	1893	1985	Chicago, Burlington and Quincy Railroad	Missouri River	West Alton and Old Jamestown	St. Charles and St. Louis	38°50′36″N 90°14′11″W
MO-27	Sunset Bridge	Replaced	Pratt truss	1885	1986		Pomme de Terre River	Bolivar	Polk	37°33′16″N 93°18′25″W
MO-28	Riddle Bridge	Replaced	Pennsylvania truss	1913	1986	Route Y	Gasconade River	Dixon	Pulaski	37°54′32″N 92°07′56″W
MO-29	Washington Avenue Bridge	Extant	Pratt truss	1911	1987	Washington Avenue	Missouri Pacific Railroad	Sedalia	Pettis	38°42′38″N 93°13′27″W
MO-30	Old St. Charles Bridge	Demolished	Pennsylvania truss	1904	1988	Route 115	Missouri River	St. Charles and Bridgeton	St. Charles and St. Louis	38°47′00″N 90°28′36″W
MO-31	Jefferson Street Bridge	Replaced	Stone arch	1857	1987	Jefferson Street	Wears Creek east branch	Jefferson City	Cole	38°34′26″N 92°10′34″W
MO-32	Bacon Bridge	Replaced	Pratt truss	1885	1987	Bacon Bridge Road	Moniteau Creek	Bacon	Moniteau	38°42′35″N 92°27′10″W
MO-33	Roberts Bluff Bridge	Replaced	Parker truss	1904	1987		Lamine River	Blackwater	Cooper	38°55′18″N 92°58′59″W
MO-38	Kingshighway Viaduct	Replaced	Reinforced concrete open-spandrel arch	1912	1987	South Kingshighway Boulevard	Missouri Pacific Railroad	St. Louis	Independent city	38°37′23″N 90°15′56″W
MO-39	Big Berger Creek Bridge	Replaced	Pratt truss	1894	1988	Route B	Big Berger Creek	Etlah	Franklin	38°38′25″N 91°16′34″W
MO-41	Clear Creek Bridge	Replaced	Pratt truss	1896	1988	Farm Road 33	Clear Creek	Ash Grove	Greene	37°21′55″N 93°34′39″W
MO-42	Schneider's Ford Bridge	Replaced	Pratt truss	1898	1988	Bald Hill Road	Moreau River	Jefferson City	Cole	38°31′25″N 92°08′15″W
MO-43	Dick's Mill Bridge	Replaced	Pratt truss	1989	1988	Hopewell Road	Moniteau Creek	Bunceton	Cooper	38°43′29″N 92°43′06″W
MO-44	James River Bridge	Replaced	Pratt truss	1885	1988	Farm Road 141	James River	Springfield	Greene	37°06′12″N 93°19′30″W
MO-45	Lewis Mill Bridge	Replaced	Pratt truss	1892	1988	CR 570	Grand River	Jameson	Daviess	39°59′47″N 94°01′52″W
MO-46	Lock Springs Bridge	Replaced	Pratt truss	1927	1988	CR 127	Grand River	Lock Springs	Daviess	39°50′41″N 93°47′51″W
MO-47	Old Grade Road Bridge	Replaced	Pratt truss	1924	1988	Old Grade Road	Salt River	Brashear	Adair	40°07′46″N 92°22′59″W
MO-48	Hootentown Bridge	Replaced	Parker truss	1910	1989	CR 133	James River	Jamesville	Stone	36°56′21″N 93°23′09″W
MO-49	Cedar Falls Road Bridge	Replaced	Pratt truss	1911	1989	Cedar Falls Road	Flat River	Desloge	St. Francois	37°53′00″N 90°30′12″W
MO-51	Gould Farm Bridge	Replaced	Pratt truss	1885	1989	Gould Farm Road	Shoal Creek	Kingston	Caldwell	39°39′55″N 93°54′07″W
MO-52	Howard Ford Bridge	Replaced	Pratt truss	1921	1989	CR 143	James River	Nixa	Christian	37°05′31″N 93°21′27″W
MO-54	East Fork Little Tarkio Bridge	Replaced	Pratt truss	1890	1989	300th Street	Little Tarkio Creek east fork	Fairfax	Atchison	40°17′30″N 95°16′30″W
MO-55	Noakes Bridge	Replaced	Pratt truss	1891	1989	130th Street	One Hundred and Two River	Hopkins	Nodaway	40°31′59″N 94°50′44″W
MO-57	Defiance Road Bridge	Replaced	Pratt truss	1908	1989	Defiance Road	Femme Osage Creek	Defiance	St. Charles	38°38′19″N 90°48′19″W
MO-58	Rockhill Road Bridge	Replaced	Stone arch	1901	1989	Rockhill Road	Brush Creek	Kansas City	Jackson	39°02′20″N 94°34′43″W
MO-59	Nineveh Bridge	Replaced	Pratt truss	1885	1989	Connelsville Road	Chariton River old channel	Connelsville	Adair	40°16′25″N 92°41′24″W
MO-60	Grand River Bridge	Replaced	Parker truss	1954	1990	Route T	Grand River	Gentryville	Gentry	40°07′55″N 94°21′00″W
MO-61	Saxton Road Bridge	Replaced	Parker truss	1925	1989	Saxton-Easton Road	Platte River	Easton	Buchanan	39°43′08″N 94°42′11″W
MO-62	Leeper Ford Bridge	Replaced	Pratt truss	1930	1989	Farm Road 34	Sac River	Ash Grove	Greene	37°23′01″N 93°36′56″W
MO-63	Windsor Harbor Road Bridge	Bypassed	Pratt truss	1875	1990	Windsor Harbor Road	Rock Creek	Kimmswick	Jefferson	38°21′50″N 90°21′44″W
MO-64	Trickum Road Bridge	Replaced	Pratt truss	1885	1990	Route BB (Trickum Road)	Heaths Creek	Longwood	Pettis	38°54′15″N 93°12′54″W
MO-65	Current River Bridge	Replaced	Parker truss	1928	1990	US 160 / Route 21	Current River	Doniphan	Ripley	36°37′04″N 90°50′21″W
MO-66	Crooked River Bridge	Replaced	Pratt truss	1893	1991	CR 168	Crooked River	Rayville	Ray	39°22′08″N 94°02′30″W
MO-67	Bridge No. 2415	Replaced	Reinforced concrete closed-spandrel arch	1918	1991	Farm Road 156	Wilsons Creek	Springfield	Greene	37°10′07″N 93°22′13″W
MO-68	Santa Fe Bridge	Replaced	Pratt truss	1888	1991	CR 24	Salt River	Santa Fe	Monroe	39°21′57″N 91°49′10″W
MO-69	Clear Creek Bridge	Replaced	Pratt truss	1886	1991	CR 312	Clear Creek	Ritchey	Newton	36°56′17″N 94°07′51″W
MO-70	Roxie Road Bridge	Replaced	Pratt truss	1906	1991	CR 450	Cane Creek	Poplar Bluff	Butler	36°44′24″N 90°30′22″W
MO-71	Klondike Road Bridge	Replaced	Parker truss	1900	1992	Klondike Road	Big River	Morse Mill	Jefferson	38°17′44″N 90°38′01″W
MO-72	Wilson Hollow Road Bridge	Demolished	Parker truss	1906	1992	Wilson Hollow Road	Big River	Vineland and Blackwell	Jefferson and St. Francois	38°04′33″N 90°37′39″W
MO-73	Bonanza Bridge	Replaced	Whipple truss	1880	1993	CR 324	Shoal Creek	Kingston	Caldwell	39°38′36″N 93°58′23″W
MO-74	Grindstone Creek Bridge	Replaced	Pratt truss	1891	1993	CR 458	Grindstone Creek	Osborn	DeKalb	39°48′16″N 94°16′14″W
MO-75	Slough Creek Bridge	Replaced	King post truss	1886	1993	CR 330	Slough Creek	Arrow Rock	Saline	39°03′32″N 92°58′08″W
MO-76	Caton Ford Bridge	Replaced	Pratt truss	1894	1993	CR 301	Marmaton River	Nevada	Vernon	37°54′33″N 94°22′22″W
MO-77	Mark Twain Memorial Bridge	Demolished	Cantilever	1936	1994	US 36	Mississippi River	Hannibal, Missouri, and East Hannibal, Illinois	Marion County, Missouri, and Pike County, Illinois	39°42′58″N 91°21′10″W
MO-78	Rock House Ford Bridge	Replaced	Parker truss	1908	1993	CR 39	Moreau River	Russellville	Cole	38°32′23″N 92°27′27″W
MO-79	Grand Glaize Bridge	Replaced	Cantilever	1931	1993	US 54	Lake of the Ozarks	Osage Beach	Camden	38°08′01″N 92°38′37″W
MO-80	Boonville Bridge	Replaced	Parker truss	1924	1994	US 40 / Route 5 / Route 87	Missouri River	Boonville and New Franklin	Cooper and Howard	38°58′52″N 92°44′45″W
MO-82	Gasconade Bridge	Replaced	Cantilever	1931	1994	Route 100	Gasconade River	Gasconade	Gasconade	38°39′58″N 91°33′21″W
MO-84	Cape Girardeau Bridge	Replaced	Cantilever	1928	1994	Route 34 / IL 146	Mississippi River	Cape Girardeau, Missouri, and East Cape Girardeau, Illinois	Cape Girardeau County, Missouri, and Alexander County, Illinois	37°17′43″N 89°30′57″W
MO-85	Lupus Bridge	Replaced	Pratt truss	1895	1995	CR 4	Splice Creek	Lupus	Moniteau	38°51′02″N 92°27′48″W
MO-89	Jerome Bridge	Replaced	Pratt truss	1928	1995	Route D	Gasconade River	Jerome	Phelps	37°55′11″N 91°58′34″W
MO-90	Van Buren Bridge	Demolished	Parker truss	1926	1995	US 60	Current River	Van Buren	Carter	36°59′32″N 91°00′53″W
MO-91	Klenklen Bridge	Replaced	Suspension	1929	1995	CR 223	Lamine River	Pleasant Green	Cooper	38°49′42″N 93°02′03″W
MO-92	Jowler Creek Bridge	Replaced	Reinforced concrete closed-spandrel arch	1913	1995	Interurban Road	Jowler Creek	Camden Point	Platte	39°25′44″N 94°45′09″W
MO-93	Francois Chouteau Bridge	Replaced	Whipple truss	1887	1996	Route 269 (Chouteau Trafficway)	Missouri River	Kansas City and North Kansas City	Jackson and Clay	39°08′44″N 94°32′02″W
MO-94	Gill Bridge	Replaced	Pratt truss	1909	1996	CR 181	Lick Creek	Perry	Ralls	39°25′34″N 91°41′05″W
MO-95	St. Louis Avenue Viaduct	Replaced	Pratt truss	1915	1996	St. Louis Avenue (now Forrester Road)	Kansas City Terminal Railway	Kansas City	Jackson	39°06′17″N 94°35′39″W
MO-96	South Greenfield Overpass	Demolished	Pratt truss	1925	1996	Route 39	Burlington Northern Railroad	South Greenfield	Dade	37°22′21″N 93°50′29″W
MO-97	Hartmann's Ford Bridge	Replaced	Pennsylvania truss	1916	1996	North Bend Road	Bourbeuse River	Union	Franklin	38°25′55″N 91°01′11″W
MO-98	Shoal Creek Bridge	Replaced	Pratt truss	1894	1996	CR 359	Shoal Creek	Kingston	Caldwell	39°40′12″N 94°04′42″W
MO-99	Merrick Ford Bridge	Replaced	Pratt truss	1891	1996	CR 321	Spring River	Waco	Jasper	37°13′04″N 94°36′27″W
MO-100	Miller Ford Bridge	Replaced	Parker truss	1908	1996	CR 469	Grand River	McFall	Gentry	40°04′37″N 94°15′18″W
MO-101	Quick City Bridge	Replaced	Pratt truss	1929	1996	CR 594	Big Creek	Quick City	Johnson	38°34′48″N 94°01′51″W
MO-102	East Twenty-third Street Viaduct	Replaced	Viaduct	1938	1997	East 23rd Street	Big Blue River	Kansas City	Jackson	39°04′57″N 94°29′34″W
MO-103	East Twenty-seventh Street Viaduct	Replaced	Viaduct	1917	1997	East 27th Street	Vine Street	Kansas City	Jackson	39°04′39″N 94°33′51″W
MO-104	Henkin's Ford Bridge	Abandoned	Warren truss	1887	1997	CR 181	Shoal Creek	Proctorville	Caldwell	39°40′24″N 93°49′54″W
MO-105	Doxie Creek Bridge	Replaced	Warren truss	1930	1997	Route 5	Doxies Creek	Forest Green	Chariton	39°16′18″N 92°51′00″W
MO-106	Chain of Rocks Bridge	Demolished	Pratt truss	1893	1997	CR 899	Cuivre River	Chain of Rocks	Lincoln	38°54′43″N 90°48′11″W
MO-107	Newman Bridge	Replaced	Reinforced concrete girder	1917	1997	NE 500 Road	Tebo Creek west fork	Calhoun	Henry	38°26′14″N 93°40′38″W
MO-108	Moody Ford Bridge	Replaced	Pratt truss	1884	1998	CR 432	Spring River north fork	Lamar	Barton	37°24′52″N 94°18′30″W
MO-109	Meramec River Bridge	Demolished	Reinforced concrete closed-spandrel arch	1926	1998	Route 19	Meramec River	Steelville	Crawford	37°58′53″N 91°22′14″W
MO-110	Sac River Bridge	Replaced	Reinforced concrete open-spandrel arch	1927	2002	US 160	Sac River	Ash Grove	Greene	37°19′55″N 93°36′52″W
MO-111	Lexington Bridge	Demolished	Warren truss	1925	2003	Route 13	Missouri River	Lexington and Henrietta	Lafayette and Ray	39°11′12″N 93°53′47″W
MO-112	Waverly Bridge	Replaced	Pennsylvania truss	1925	2003	US 24 / US 65	Missouri River	Waverly	Lafayette and Carroll	39°12′54″N 93°30′56″W
MO-114	Hermann Bridge	Replaced	Cantilever	1930	2005	Route 19	Missouri River	Hermann	Gasconade and Montgomery	38°42′35″N 91°26′18″W
MO-115	McCutcheon Street Bridge	Replaced	Reinforced concrete rigid frame	1946	2007	McCutcheon Road	I-64 / US 40	St. Louis	Independent city	38°37′54″N 90°21′16″W
MO-116	Paseo Bridge	Replaced	Suspension	1955	2007	I-29 / I-35	Missouri River	Kansas City and North Kansas City	Jackson and Clay	39°07′22″N 94°33′57″W
NE-4	Rulo Bridge	Replaced	Whipple truss	1887	1986	Chicago, Burlington and Quincy Railroad	Missouri River	Big Lake, Missouri, and Rulo, Nebraska	Holt County, Missouri, and Richardson County, Nebraska	40°03′16″N 95°25′15″W
