= Sampsel =

Sampsel may refer to:

- Sampsel, Missouri, an unincorporated community in Livingston County, Missouri, United States
- Sampsel Township, Livingston County, Missouri, a township in Livingston County, Missouri, United States
