= Shoal Creek (Grand River tributary) =

Stream in the U.S. state of Missouri

Shoal Creek is a stream in Clinton, Caldwell and Livingston counties in the U.S. state of Missouri. It is a tributary of the Grand River.

The stream headwaters arise approximately one mile south-southeast of Lathrop at 39°31′49″N 94°19′25″W at an elevation of approximately 330 m (1,080 ft). It then flows north past the east side of Lathrop passing under Missouri Route 116. From there, it flows to the north-northeast passing under Missouri Route H two miles east of the community of Turney. It continues passing under U.S. Route 69 and I-35 just north of the Wallace State Park. The stream then flows east passing under Missouri Route 13 just north of Kingston and approximately six miles south of Hamilton. It meanders to the east and passes into the southern Livingston County flowing past the communities of Ludlow and Dawn. The stream flows to the northeast roughly paralleling the Shoal Creek Ditch two miles south of Utica. It passes under U.S. Route 65 and enters the Grand River three miles south of Chillicothe. The confluence is at 39°44′28″N 93°32′14″W at an elevation of 209 m (686 ft).
