= Southwest R-1 School District =

School district in Missouri, U.S.

Southwest Livingston County R-1 Schools

Location
- Ludlow, Missouri; United States

District information
- Type: Public
- Motto: The Mission of the Southwest Livingston county R-1 School District.
- Established: 1958

Students and staff
- District mascot: Wildcats
- Colors: Blue and white

Other information
- Website: www.southwestr1.org

Southwest R-1 School District is a small rural school near Ludlow, Missouri. Southwest serves four local communities: Dawn, Ludlow, Mooresville, and Utica and has been fully accredited by the Department of Elementary and Secondary Education.

== Education offered ==
- Dual Credit Classes through ITV
- A+ Program
- Special Education

== Sports ==
- Basketball
- Football
- Softball
- Baseball
- Academic Team
- Band
- Choir
- Track and Field
- Cheerleading
- Dance Team

== Student organizations ==
- FCCLA
- FFA
- FBLA
- Hi-Step
- NHS
- FCA
- Student Council
