= Rich Hill Township, Livingston County, Missouri =

Township in Livingston County, Missouri, U.S.

Coordinates: 39.85°N 93.49°W

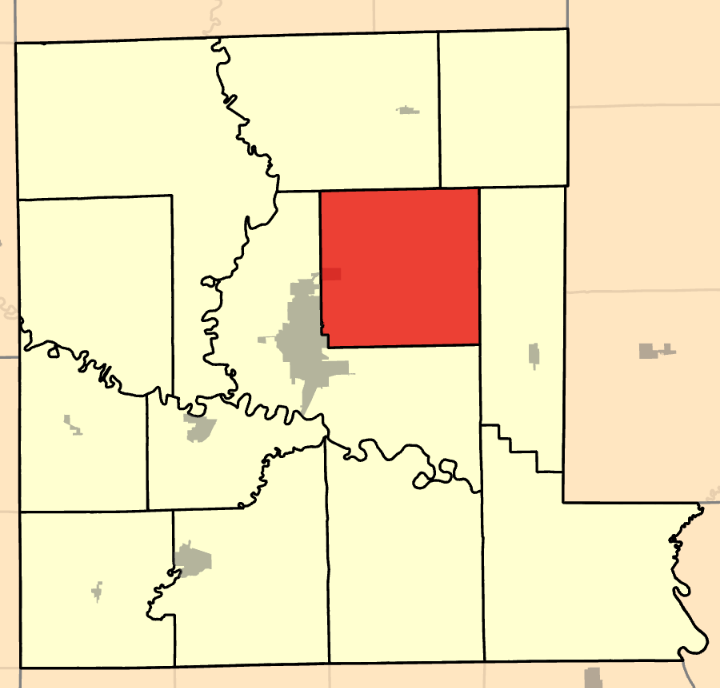

Rich Hill Township is a township in Livingston County, in the U.S. state of Missouri.

Rich Hill Township was established on November 30th, 1872, when it was split off from Chillicothe Township. Its original name was Grant, but five days later it was changed to Rich Hill on account of their fertile soil.
