= Bellefontaine Bridge =

Railroad bridge over the Missouri River

Coordinates: 38.8433°N 90.2365°W

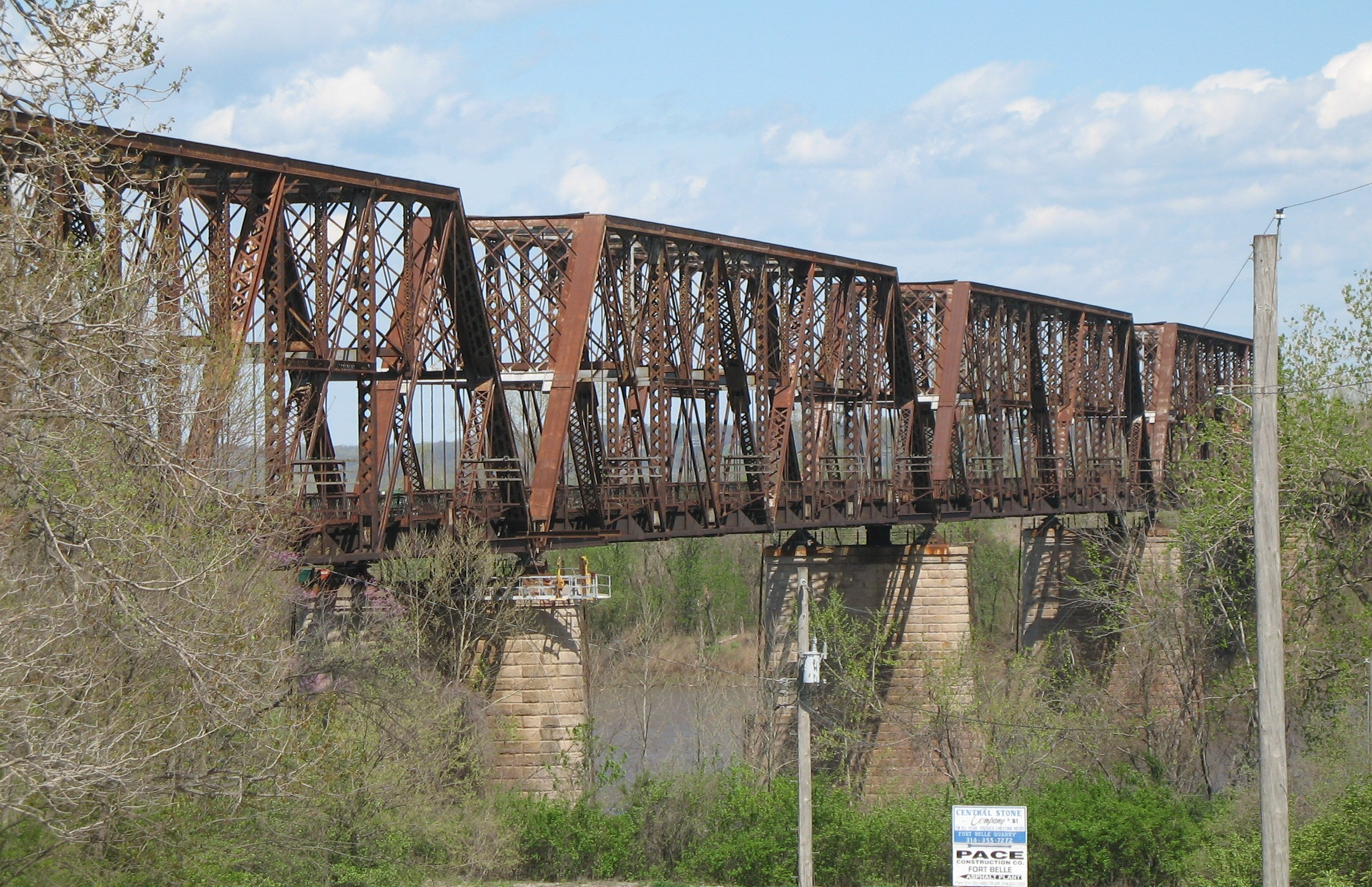
Bellefontaine Bridge from the west.

The Bellefontaine Bridge is a four-span truss railroad bridge over the Missouri River between St. Charles County, Missouri, and St. Louis County, Missouri. It has four 440-foot (130 m) spans. Construction started on July 4, 1892, and the bridge opened on December 27, 1893.

The bridge was built by the Chicago, Burlington and Quincy Railroad and is now owned and operated by BNSF Railway. New Jersey Steel and Iron Company of Trenton, New Jersey, served as the contractor for the original construction, and George S. Morison designed the structure. Notably, the bridge was one of the first to use a Baltimore truss design; the nearby Merchants Bridge (also designed by Morison) used a Pennsylvania through truss design and had opened just a few years prior. The truss spans are found on masonry piers, which were constructed atop caissons founded into bedrock below the river.

The structure is the last railroad structure over the Missouri River before its confluence with the Mississippi River.

== See also ==
- List of bridges documented by the Historic American Engineering Record in Missouri
- List of crossings of the Missouri River
