= Norville (disambiguation) =

Norville is a commune in the Seine-Maritime département of the Haute-Normandie region of northern France.

It may also refer to:

== Places ==
- Norville, Queensland, a suburb of Bundaberg in Queensland, Australia
- La Norville, a town and a commune in the Essonne département, in the French region of Île-de-France
- Norville, Missouri, a community in the United States

== People ==
- Deborah Norville (born 1958), American television broadcaster and journalist
- Jason Norville (born 1983), Trinidadian soccer player
- Kenneth Norville (1908−1999), birth name of American jazz musician, Red Norvo

== Fictional characters ==
- Kitty Norville, main character in a series of novels by Carrie Vaughn
- Norville "Shaggy" Rogers, a character in the animated television series Scooby-Doo
- Norville, an animated bird in the PBS series Clifford's Puppy Days
- Ian Norville, a character in the third season of Without a Trace
- Norville Trollman, a character in the Nick Jr. series Wallykazam!
