= Genova, Missouri =

Extinct town in the American state of Missouri

Coordinates: 39°54′21″N 93°42′17″W

Genova is an extinct town in Livingston County, in the U.S. state of Missouri. The GNIS classifies it as a populated place.

The State Historical Society of Missouri speculates Genova derives its name from Geneva and/or Genoa. A post office called Genova was established in 1891, and remained in operation until 1901.
