= Lenora Mattingly Weber =

American writer (1895–1971)

Lenora Mattingly Weber (1895–1971) was an American writer of short stories and novels.

Lenora Mattingly was born in Dawn, Missouri on October 1, 1895, and lived most of her life in Denver, Colorado. She married Albert Herman Weber in 1916 and was the mother of six children. Al Weber died in 1945.

Throughout her life, Weber consistently wrote. Her first book, Wind on the Prairie, was published by Little, Brown and Company in 1929. From 1930 through 1962 she wrote short stories for magazines such as The Saturday Evening Post, McCall's, and Good Housekeeping. Weber wrote a monthly column for the Catholic Extension magazine, which gave her a steady source of income, which she depended on after Al Weber's death in 1945. Her last book was published posthumously in 1972.

Weber's favorite topics included the Denver area, horses, and teenage girls. In 1943 the Thomas Y. Crowell Co. published the first Beany Malone book, Meet the Malones. Beany Malone became Weber's most well-known creation, featured in 14 books and appearing as a minor character in the Katie Rose Belford and Stacy Belford series.

Weber died on January 30, 1971. She wrote 34 books, including a cookbook of Beany Malone-inspired recipes, and more than 80 short stories (including serializations of some of her novels.)

Until they were republished by Image Cascade starting in 1999, the Beany Malone and Belford series were scarce and avidly collected. A diverse group of Beany fans lives worldwide and discusses all things Weber online. In 2002, Image Cascade published a biography, Nonie, which combined Weber's own autobiographical notes with a biography written by her son David Weber.

Weber's papers are held at the Denver Public Library. In 1969 Weber herself donated the bulk of these materials; her son David Weber donated some materials in 2003. This collection is open for research.

== Non-series books ==
- Wind on the Prairie. Boston: Little, Brown & Co., 1929.
- The Gypsy Bridle. Boston: Little, Brown & Co., 1930.
- Podgy and Sally, Co-eds. Boston: Barse & Co., 1930.
- A Wish in the Dark. Boston: Little, Brown & Co., 1931.
- Mr. Gold and Her Neighborhood House. Boston: Little, Brown & Co., 1933.
- Rocking Chair Ranch. Boston: Houghton Mifflin Co., 1936.
- Happy Landing. New York: Thomas Y. Crowell Co., 1941.
- Sing for Your Supper. New York: Thomas Y. Crowell Co., 1941.
- Riding High. New York: Thomas Y. Crowell Co., 1946.
- My True Love Waits. New York: Thomas Y. Crowell Co., 1953/Image Cascade Publishing.
- For Goodness Sake! Cookbook, with Greta Hilb. Denver: Sage Books, 1964.
- Beany Malone Cookbook. New York: Thomas Y. Crowell Co., 1972.

== Beany Malone series ==
- Meet the Malones. New York: Thomas Y. Crowell Co., 1943/Image Cascade Publishing, 1999.
- Beany Malone. New York: Thomas Y. Crowell Co., 1948/Image Cascade Publishing, 1999.
- Leave it to Beany! New York: Thomas Y. Crowell Co., 1950/Image Cascade Publishing, 1999.
- Beany and the Beckoning Road. New York: Thomas Y. Crowell Co., 1952/Image Cascade Publishing, 1999.
- Beany Has a Secret Life. New York: Thomas Y. Crowell Co., 1955/Image Cascade Publishing, 1999.
- Make a Wish for Me. New York: Thomas Y. Crowell Co., 1956/Image Cascade Publishing, 1999.
- Happy Birthday, Dear Beany. New York: Thomas Y. Crowell Co., 1957/Image Cascade Publishing, 1999.
- The More the Merrier. New York: Thomas Y. Crowell Co., 1958/Image Cascade Publishing, 1999.
- A Bright Star Falls. New York: Thomas Y. Crowell Co., 1959/Image Cascade Publishing, 1999.
- Welcome Stranger. New York: Thomas Y. Crowell Co., 1960/Image Cascade Publishing, 1999.
- Pick a New Dream. New York: Thomas Y. Crowell Co., 1961/Image Cascade Publishing, 1999.
- Tarry Awhile. New York: Thomas Y. Crowell Co., 1962/Image Cascade Publishing, 1999.
- Something Borrowed, Something Blue. New York: Thomas Y. Crowell Co., 1963/Image Cascade Publishing, 1999.
- Come Back, Wherever You Are. New York: Thomas Y. Crowell Co., 1969/Image Cascade Publishing, 1999.

== Katie Rose Belford series ==
- Don't Call Me Katie Rose. New York: Thomas Y. Crowell Co., 1964/Image Cascade Publishing, 2000.
- The Winds of March. New York: Thomas Y. Crowell Co., 1965/Image Cascade Publishing, 2000.
- A New and Different Summer. New York: Thomas Y. Crowell Co., 1966/Image Cascade Publishing, 2000.
- I Met a Boy I Used to Know. New York: Thomas Y. Crowell Co., 1967/Image Cascade Publishing, 2000.
- Angel in Heavy Shoes. New York: Thomas Y. Crowell Co., 1968/Image Cascade Publishing, 2000.

== Stacy Belford series ==
- How Long Is Always? New York: Thomas Y. Crowell Co., 1970/Image Cascade Publishing, 2000.
- Hello, My Love, Good-bye. New York: Thomas Y. Crowell Co., 1971/Image Cascade Publishing, 2000.
- Sometimes a Stranger. New York: Thomas Y. Crowell Co., 1972/Image Cascade Publishing, 2000.
