= Green Township, Livingston County, Missouri =

Township in Livingston County, Missouri, U.S.

Coordinates: 39.7347°N 93.5989°W

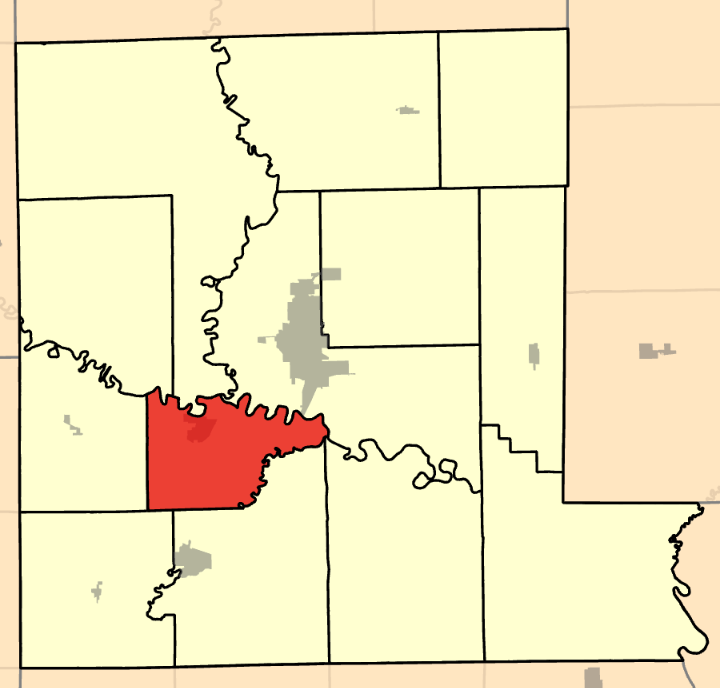

Green Township is a township in Livingston County, Missouri, United States.

The first name for this township was Shoal Creek after a nearby creek, then in February 1839, it was changed to Monroe. In April 1839, the northern portion was divided and named Green Township in honor of Nathanael Greene (1742–1786), American Revolutionary War general.
