= Cream Ridge Township, Livingston County, Missouri =

Township in the U.S. state of Missouri

Coordinates: 39.9234535°N 93.5273601°W

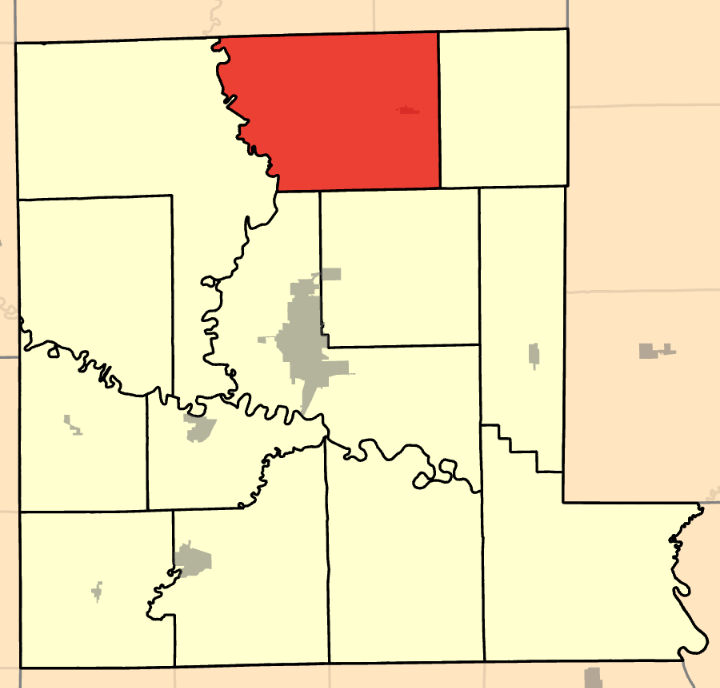

Cream Ridge Township is a township in Livingston County, in the U.S. state of Missouri.

Cream Ridge Township was established in 1857 and a community called Cream Ridge existed there.
