= George S. Morison =

American bridge engineer (1842-1903)

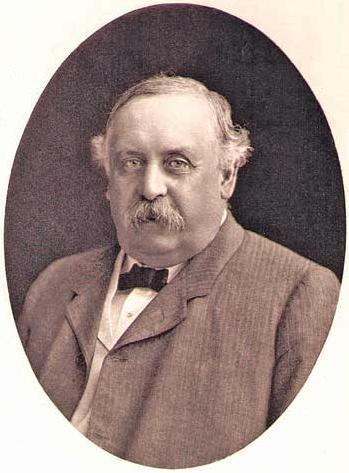
- Born: December 19, 1842; New Bedford, Massachusetts, U.S.
- Died: July 1, 1903 (aged 60); New York, New York, U.S.
- Education: Harvard University
- Occupations: Lawyer; civil engineer

George Shattuck Morison (December 19, 1842 – July 1, 1903) was an American engineer. A classics major at Harvard who trained to be a lawyer, he instead became a civil engineer and leading bridge designer in North America during the late 19th century. During his lifetime, bridge design evolved from using 'empirical “rules of thumb” to the use of mathematical analysis techniques'. Some of Morison's projects included several large Missouri River bridges as well as the great cantilever railroad bridge at Memphis, Tennessee, and the Boone, Iowa viaduct. Morison served as president of the American Society of Civil Engineers (1895) as well as a member of the British Institute of Civil Engineers winning that institution's Telford Medal in 1892 for his work on the Memphis bridge. In 1899, he was appointed to the Isthmian Canal Commission and recommended it be built at Panama.

== History ==
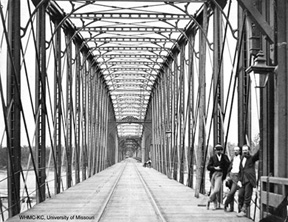
The Hannibal Bridge in 1869, Morison stands on the right

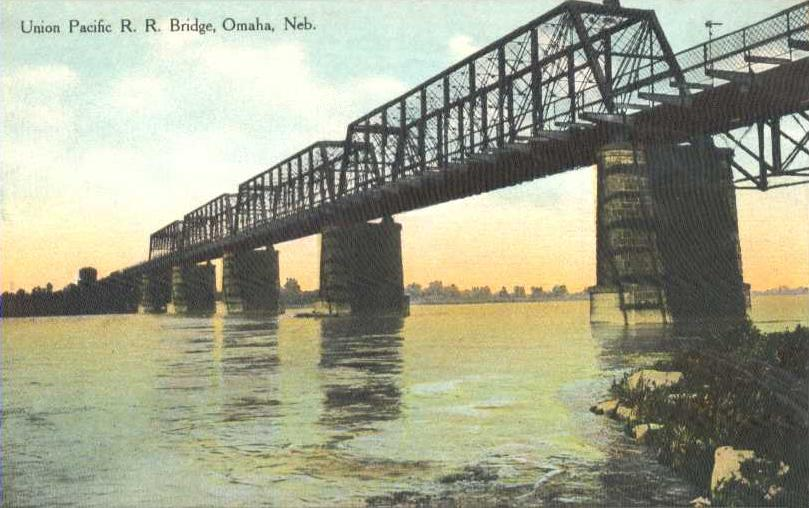
Union Pacific R. R. Bridge (1887) between Omaha, Nebraska and Council Bluffs, Iowa

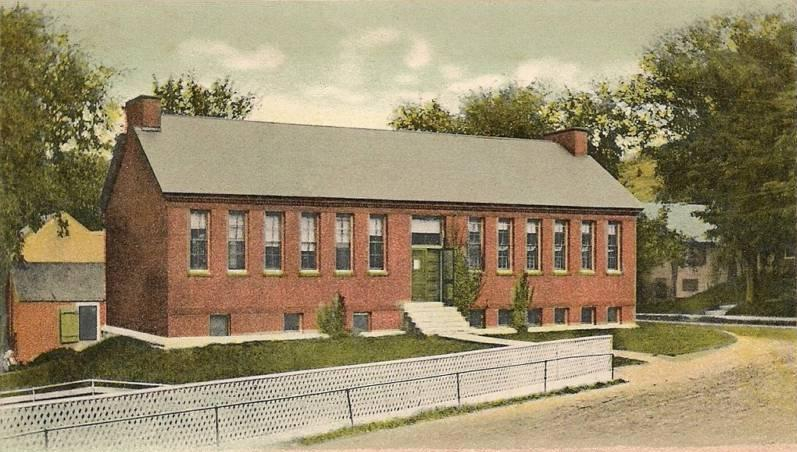
The Morison-designed town library in Peterborough, New Hampshire

Born in New Bedford, Massachusetts, he was the son of John Hopkins Morison, a Unitarian minister. At age 14, he entered Phillips Exeter Academy and graduated by age 16. He went on to Harvard College where he was a classmate of philosopher John Fiske. Morison received a Bachelor of Arts degree in 1863 when he was just 20. After a brief break he attended Harvard Law School where he earned a Bachelor of Laws degree and was admitted to the New York Bar. In 1867, with only general mathematics training and an aptitude for mechanics, he abandoned the practice of law and pursued a career as a civil engineer. He apprenticed under Octave Chanute, along with Joseph Tomlinson, during the construction of the first bridge to cross the Missouri River, the swing-span Hannibal Bridge.

Morison designed many steel truss bridges, including several crossing the Missouri River, Ohio River, and the Mississippi River. The 1892, Memphis Bridge is considered to be his crowning achievement, the largest bridge he designed and the first to span the difficult Lower Mississippi River.

Morison was a member of several important engineering committees, the most important of which was the Isthmus Canal Commission, where he was instrumental in changing its recommended location from Nicaragua to Panama. In The Path Between the Seas, author David McCullough notes that in the Panama canal affair, "Morison emerges a bit like the butler at the end of the mystery--as the ever-present, frequently unobtrusive, highly instrumental fixture around whom the entire plot turned." McCullough believed that had Morison lived, Theodore Roosevelt would have asked him to take a major part in the building of the canal.

In the 1890s, Morison developed a series of lectures — inspired by reading his Harvard classmate Fiske's book The Discovery of America — on the transformative effects of the new manufacturing power of that era. Though he collected these lectures for publication in 1898, they were not published until 1903, shortly after his death, under the title The New Epoch as Developed by the Manufacture of Power.

Morison died in his rooms at 36 West 50th Street in New York, and was buried in Peterborough, New Hampshire, where he had a summer home (and designed the town library).

He was the great-uncle of historian of technology Elting E. Morison (1909–1995).

== Personality ==
According to David McCullough, Morison was "arrogant, inflexible, most unpopular, a man who was easy to admire from a distance." According to Elting Morison, his great uncle was rude to waiters, hired a substitute during the Civil War, and "invariably referred to Mexico as Pjacko." He "had, like Zeno, a conviction that time was a solid. If he made an appointment to confer with a person at 3:15 P.M., as he always put it, at 15:15 hours, that was when they met. Those who arrived earlier waited; those who came at any time after 15:15 never conferred at all." Morison read the Anabasis in Greek, the Aeneid in Latin, and the dime novels of Archibald Clavering Gunter in English. "He thought that people who were good with animals, particularly horses, were popular with their fellows and loose in their morals. When he himself drove a horse, he brought it to a full stop by saying, 'Whoa, cow.'" One Sunday Morison walked out of church when the minister preached that silver should be coined at a ratio of 16 to 1, telling the minister that "he should never try to deal with a subject he obviously didn't understand." Of his neighbor, composer Edward MacDowell, Morison said, he was "a man with whom I had absolutely nothing in common." Between 1893 and 1897, Morison, a bachelor, built a house of about 57 rooms so, he said, that he would "have a place to eat Thanksgiving dinner and to watch the sun set over Mount Monadnock." A fellow engineer, one Fullerton L. Waldo, wrote that he hated eating lunch with Morison, "but I'd trust his judgment sooner than that of any other engineer I know."

== See also ==
- Alton Bridge
- Bellefontaine Bridge
- Burlington Rail Bridge
- Cairo Rail Bridge
- Maroon Creek Bridge
- Merchants Bridge
- Frisco Bridge
- Taft Bridge

== Sources ==
- Historic American Engineering Record (Library of Congress) – Survey number HAER NE-2. 500+ data pages discuss Chief Engineer George S. Morison and his many bridges
- Gerber, E., Prout, H. G., and Schneider, C. C. (1905). “Memoir of George Shattuck Morison.” Trans. Am. Soc. Civ. Eng., Volume 54, 513–521.
