= Upper Bridge =

Upper Bridge may refer to:

in Slovenia

- Cobblers' Bridge, also known as Shoemakers' Bridge or Upper Bridge crossing the river Ljubljanica in Ljubljana, the capital of Slovenia

in the United States

- Upper Bridge (Warsaw, Missouri), listed on the NRHP in Missouri
