= Rulo Rail Bridge =

Bridge across the Missouri River in the US

Coordinates: 40°03′16″N 95°25′15″W

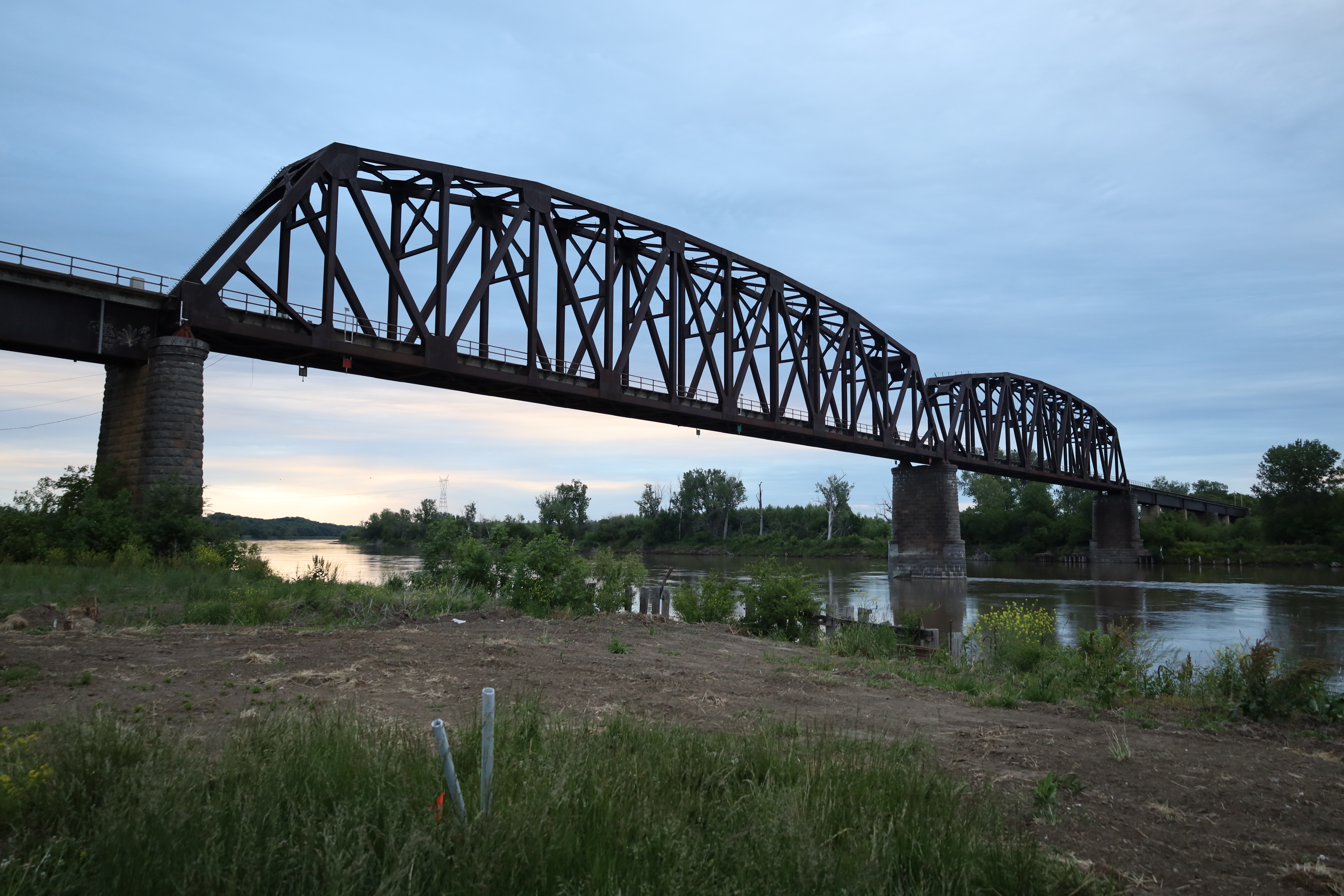
The bridge in 2025

The Rulo Rail Bridge is a truss bridge across the Missouri River connecting Rulo, Nebraska, with Holt County, Missouri, and is used by the BNSF Railway to transport coal from Wyoming and Colorado to Midwest power plants.

== History ==
=== Original bridge ===
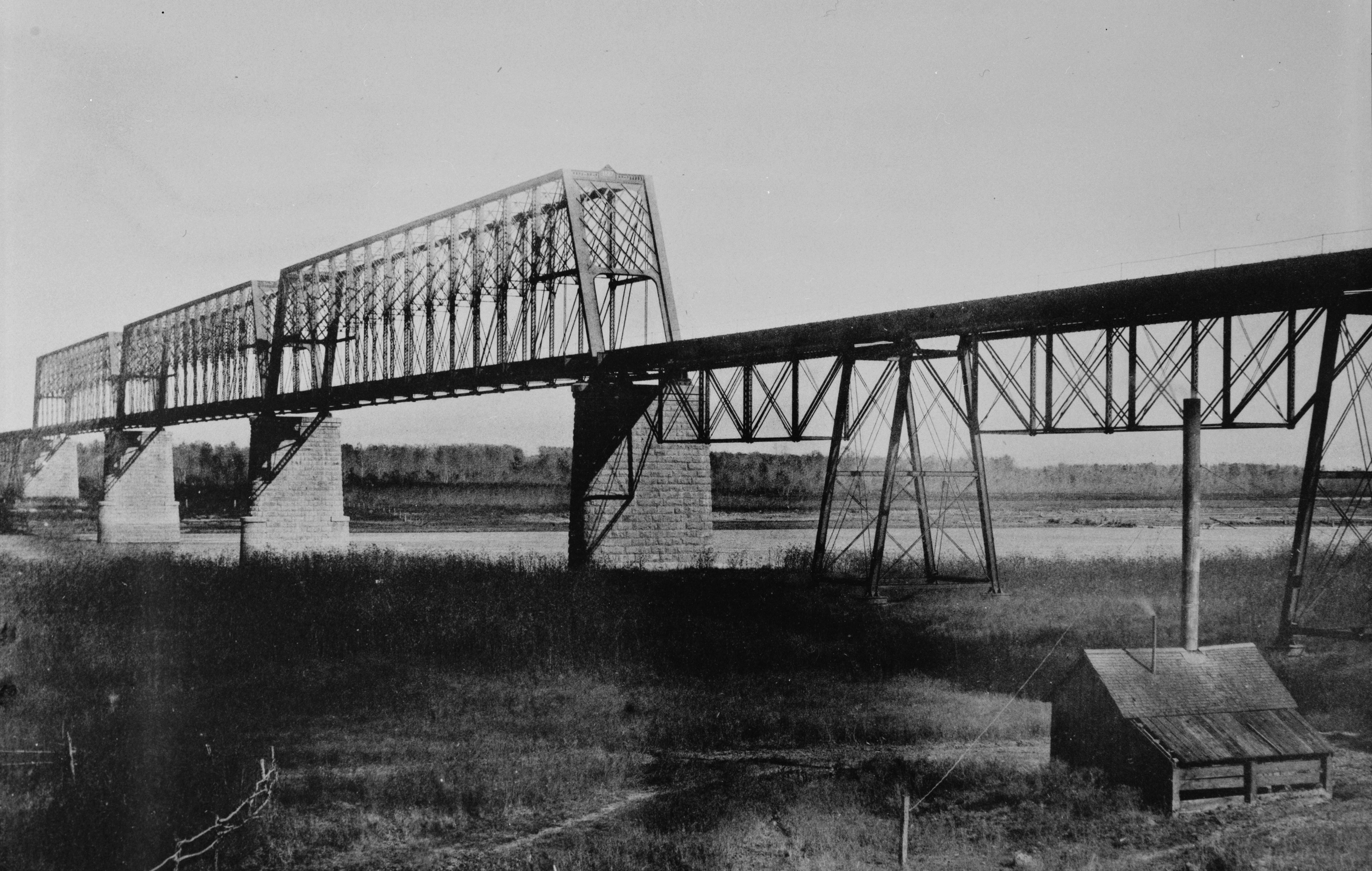
The original Rulo Rail Bridge, which had 3 truss spans

The original bridge opened for service in the first week of October 1887 for a cost of about US$1.02 million. It had three 375-foot-long (114 m) steel truss spans. The bridge was fabricated in England and reassembled at Rulo.

=== Current bridge ===
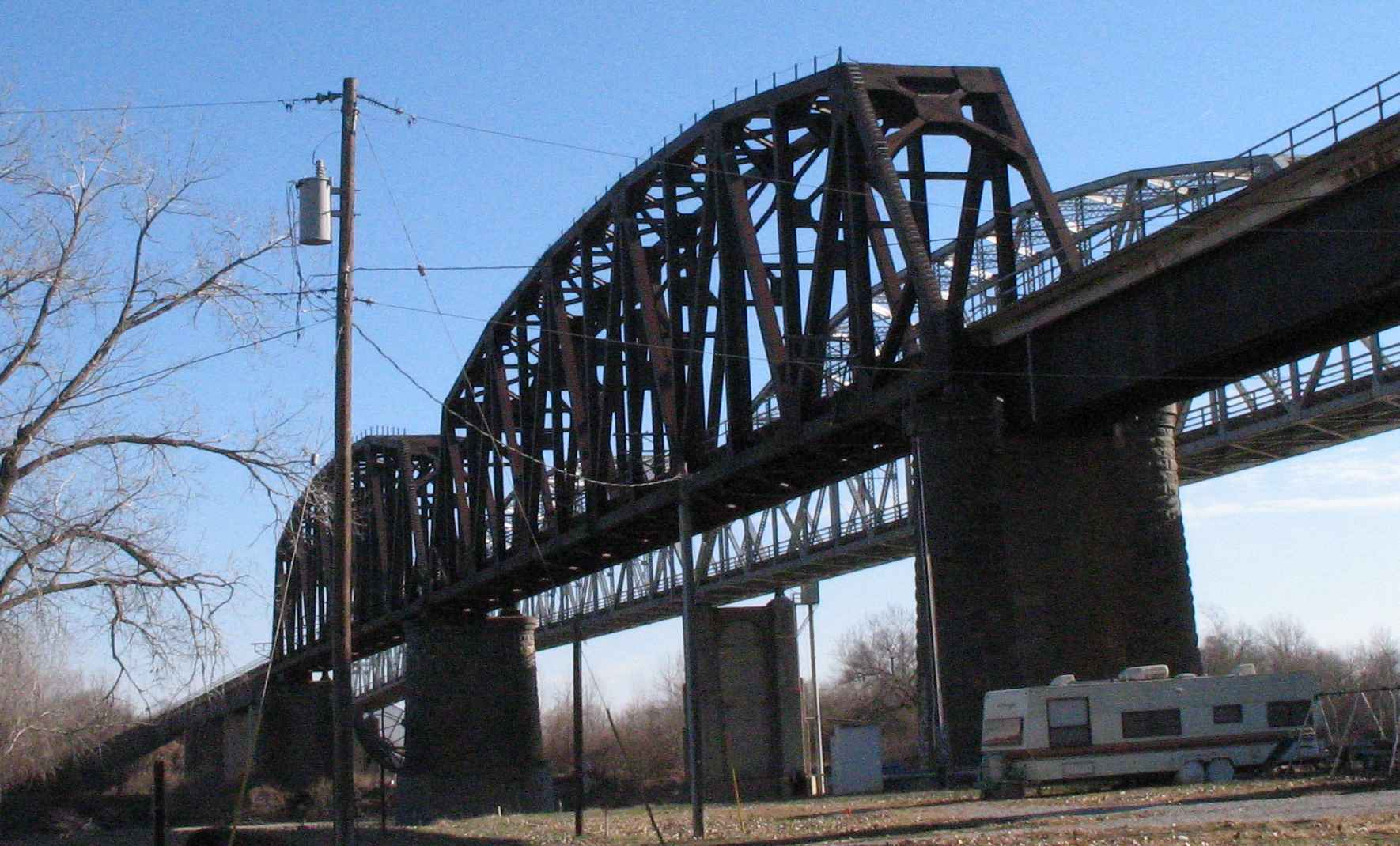
Rulo Rail Bridge in 2006, from the Nebraska side. The road bridge, now demolished, is just to the south.

In January 1976, Burlington Northern (the predecessor of BNSF) announced plans to rebuild the bridge, which was 2,049 feet (625 m) long at the time but would be shortened to 1,863 feet (568 m) in the reconstructed version.

In 1977, the steel truss was replaced in 48 hours when sections of the new bridge were assembled on either side of the river, then lifted onto falsework towers on barges on both sides of the up and downstream sides. The new bridge was placed on the upstream towers and the old bridge was moved to the downstream side and then new bridge was placed on the original 1887 piers. The bridge now has two main spans over the river that are 375 feet (114 m) long.

The replaced bridge was dedicated on December 20, 1977, and the total cost of the operation was $8 million. Prior to the replacement, only grain rather than coal trains could cross the bridge. The updated bridge would host coal trains traveling 45 miles per hour (72 km/h) over the river.

== See also ==
- List of bridges documented by the Historic American Engineering Record in Missouri
- List of bridges documented by the Historic American Engineering Record in Nebraska
- List of crossings of the Missouri River

== Bibliography ==
- Lincoln Star (Lincoln, Nebraska), July 7, 1977, Page 5
- Morison, George S. (May 1, 1890). The Rulo Bridge: A report to Charles E. Perkins, President of the Chicago, Burlington & Quincy Railroad (Report). Chicago, Burlington & Quincy Railroad. ARK ark:/13960/t0dv9cb2j.
- "Staging span replacement for old bridge saves $5 million". Engineering News-Record. Vol. 198, no. 25. June 23, 1977. p. 58. ISSN 0891-9526.
