= Lena Hughes =

Lena Hughes (1904–1998) was a guitar, fiddle, and banjo player known as an exemplar of the "parlor music" genre.

She was born in Missouri and lived in the town of Ludlow nearly all of her life. She started playing banjo around the age of nine and by the 1920s was playing at square dances. She performed at folk festivals and other events, often accompanied by her husband, Jake, who played guitar. Their repertoire was the popular music of the 19th century, now often referred to as parlor music. Hughes won first place in some fiddling competitions in the 1960s.

Hughes released only a single record during her lifetime, the eponymously titled Lena Hughes recorded sometime in the 1960s and released in a few hundred copies. Nonetheless, she is considered to be an influential figure in the 20th-century Ozark folk music circuit. The album was re-released in the 1990s under the title Queen of the Flat-Top Guitar and in 2013 by Tompkins Square Records. The album liner notes by John Renbourn of the group Pentangle note that Hughes's "approach to the guitar—tunings, techniques, harmony—fed directly into the rural styles, ragtime, and blues, and laid the foundations for the music that has gone on to shape the listening of the modern world."

A recording of Hughes talking about her history was made by a folklore scholar working for the Smithsonian Institution in the 1970s.

Hughes continued performing into her eighties. She died at age 94.
