= Sturges, Missouri =

Unincorporated community in Missouri, U.S.

Coordinates: 39°52′38″N 93°30′04″W

Sturges is an unincorporated community in Livingston County, in the U.S. state of Missouri.

== History ==
A post office was established at Sturges in 1882, and remained in operation until 1937. The community may derive its name from Samuel D. Sturgis, an officer in the Civil War.
