= Chula, Missouri =

- City
- Location of Chula, Missouri
- Coordinates: 39°55′19″N 93°28′39″W
- Country: United States
- State: Missouri
- County: Livingston

Area
  - Total: 0.18 sq mi (0.46 km^{2})
  - Land: 0.18 sq mi (0.46 km^{2})
  - Water: 0 sq mi (0.00 km^{2})
- Elevation: 761 ft (232 m)

Population (2020)
  - Total: 195
  - Density: 1,096.2/sq mi (423.24/km^{2})
- Time zone: UTC-6 (Central (CST))
  - Summer (DST): UTC-5 (CDT)
- ZIP code: 64635
- Area code: 660
- FIPS code: 29-13852
- GNIS feature ID: 2393522
- Website: www.cityofchula.com

Chula is a city in Livingston County, Missouri, United States. The population was 195 at the 2020 census.

== History ==
A post office called Chula has been in operation since 1888. Chula is a Choctaw Indian name meaning "red fox". It is unclear why the name Chula was applied to this community.

== Geography ==
Chula is located on Cream Ridge adjacent to the west side of the Medicine Creek floodplain to the northeast of Chillicothe. Missouri routes K and V serve the community and the old Chicago, Milwaukee, St. Paul and Pacific Railroad line passes through the town.

According to the United States Census Bureau, the city has a total area of 0.18 square miles (0.47 km^{2}), all land.

== Demographics ==
Historical population
Census	Pop.	Note	%±
1900	282		—
1910	384		36.2%
1920	444		15.6%
1930	388		−12.6%
1940	439		13.1%
1950	314		−28.5%
1960	285		−9.2%
1970	244		−14.4%
1980	244		0.0%
1990	183		−25.0%
2000	198		8.2%
2010	210		6.1%
2020	195		−7.1%
U.S. Decennial Census

=== 2010 census ===
As of the census of 2010, there were 210 people, 77 households, and 55 families residing in the city. The population density was 1,166.7 inhabitants per square mile (450.5/km^{2}). There were 91 housing units at an average density of 505.6 per square mile (195.2/km^{2}). The racial makeup of the city was 93.3% White, 0.5% African American, 1.0% Native American, 1.0% Asian, 1.9% from other races, and 2.4% from two or more races. Hispanic or Latino of any race were 5.2% of the population.

There were 77 households, of which 41.6% had children under the age of 18 living with them, 55.8% were married couples living together, 13.0% had a female householder with no husband present, 2.6% had a male householder with no wife present, and 28.6% were non-families. 24.7% of all households were made up of individuals, and 9.1% had someone living alone who was 65 years of age or older. The average household size was 2.73 and the average family size was 3.11.

The median age in the city was 34.8 years. 27.6% of residents were under the age of 18; 11.4% were between the ages of 18 and 24; 26.7% were from 25 to 44; 23.8% were from 45 to 64; and 10.5% were 65 years of age or older. The gender makeup of the city was 49.0% male and 51.0% female.

=== 2000 census ===
As of the 2000 census, 198 people, 71 households, and 50 families were residing in Chula. The population density was 1,192.1 inhabitants per square mile (460.3/km^{2}). The average density of the 80 housing units was 481.7 per square mile (181.7/km^{2}). The racial makeup of the city was 98.99% White, 0.51% Native American, and 0.51% from two or more races.

Of the 71 households, 45.1% had children under the age of 18, 50.7% were married couples, 18.3% were single female householders, and 28.2% were non-families. 26.8% of all households were made up of individuals; 14.1% were 65 years of age or older and living alone. The average household size was 2.79 and the average family size was 3.31.

In Chula, 37.9% of the population was under the age of 18, 5.1% were 18 to 24, 27.3% were 25 to 44, 18.2% were 45 to 64, and 11.6% were 65 years of age or older. The median age was 32 years. For every 100 females, there were 76.8 males. For every 100 females age 18 and over, there were 92.2 males.

The median income for a household was $30,208, and the median income for a family was $30,625. Males had a median income of $26,250 versus $10,000 for females. The per capita income for the city was $11,920. About 24.5% of families and 21.5% of the population were below the poverty line, including 21.4% of those under the age of eighteen and 43.5% of those 65 or over.
