= Wheeling Township, Livingston County, Missouri =

Township in Livingston County, Missouri, U.S.

Coordinates: 39.77°N 93.385°W

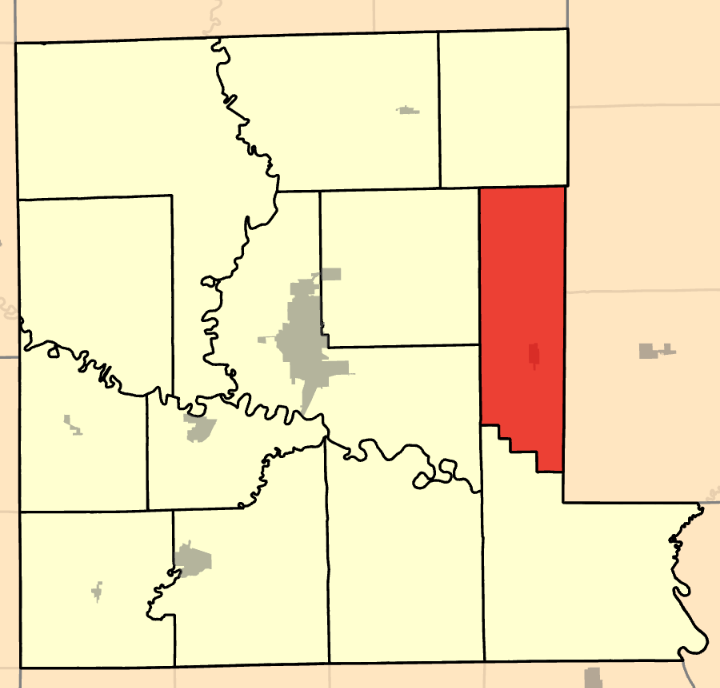

Wheeling Township is a township in Livingston County, Missouri, United States.
