= Cream Ridge, Missouri =

Extinct town in the U.S. state of Missouri

Coordinates: 39°47′07″N 93°27′46″W

Cream Ridge is an extinct town in Livingston County, in the U.S. state of Missouri. The GNIS classifies it as a populated place.

A post office called Cream Ridge was established in 1868, and remained in operation until 1893. The community most likely took its name from Cream Ridge Township.
