= Fairview Township, Livingston County, Missouri =

Township in Livingston County, Missouri, U.S.

Coordinates: 39.66°N 93.48°W

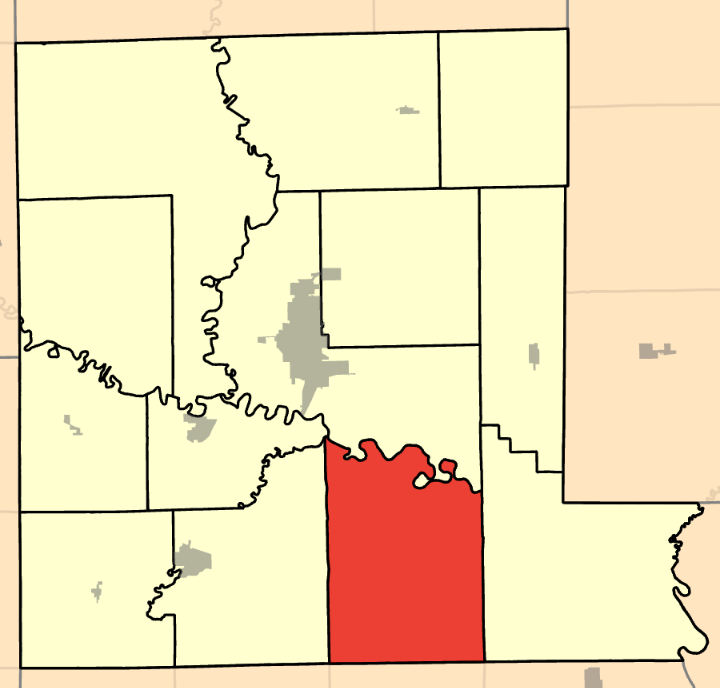

Fairview Township is a township in Livingston County, Missouri, United States.
