= Sampsel Township, Livingston County, Missouri =

Township in Livingston County, Missouri, U.S.

Coordinates: 39.83°N 93.73°W

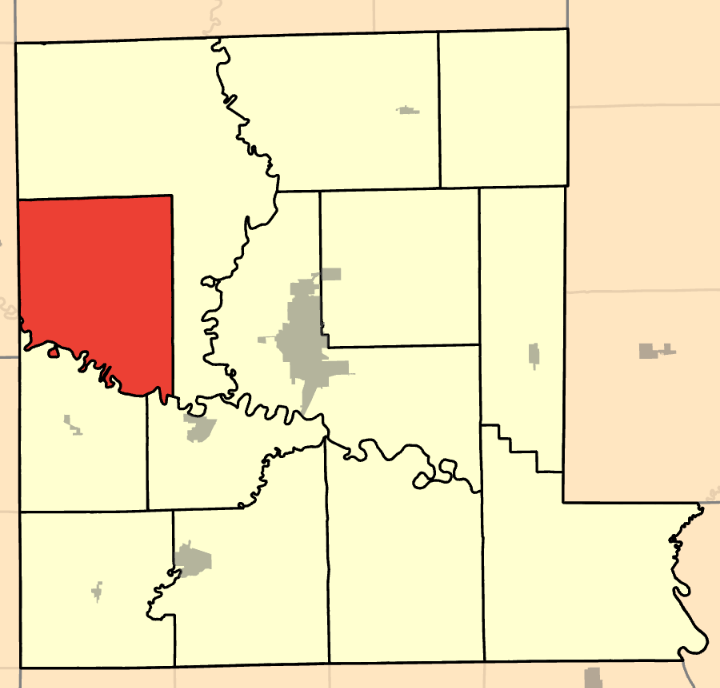

Sampsel Township is a township in Livingston County, in the U.S. state of Missouri.

Sampsel Township was established on July 22nd, 1874, taking its name from the community of Sampsel, Missouri. Settlements in this township date back to as early as 1834. The unofficial name for this township was "Lost Township" due to the original surveys made of it being lost when the surveyor died.
