= Medicine Township, Livingston County, Missouri =

Township in Livingston County, Missouri, U.S.

Coordinates: 39.92°N 93.406°W

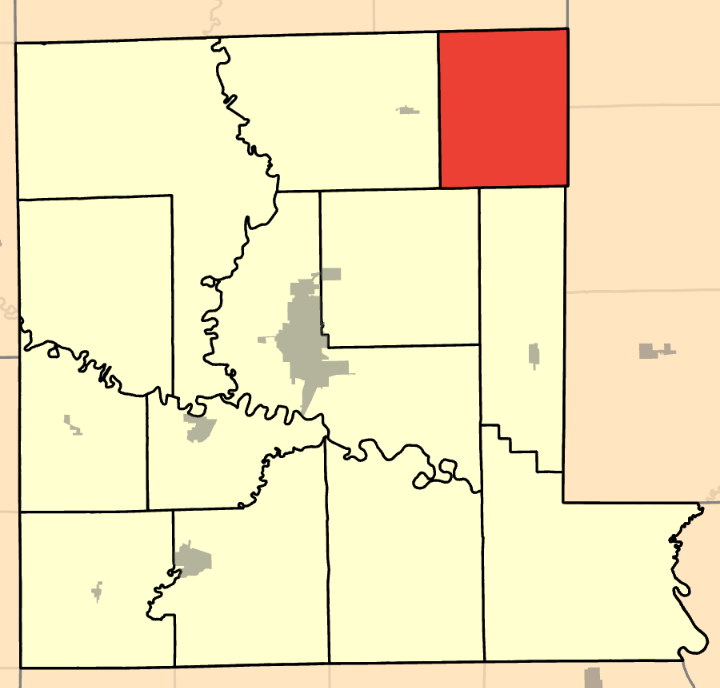

Medicine Township is a township in Livingston County, Missouri, United States.
