= Mooresville Township, Livingston County, Missouri =

Township in Livingston County, Missouri, U.S.

Coordinates: 39.73°N 93.708°W

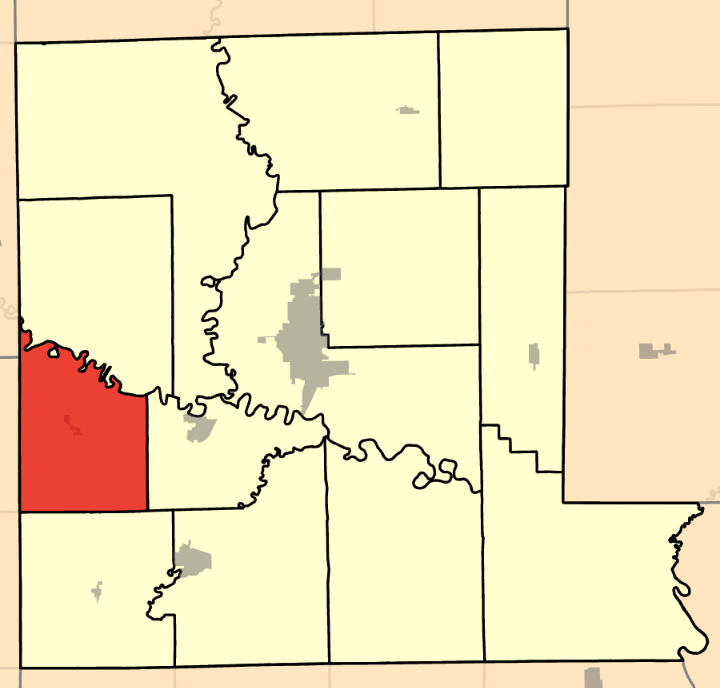

Mooresville Township is a township in Livingston County, Missouri, United States.
