= Blue Mound Township, Livingston County, Missouri =

Township in Livingston County, Missouri, U.S.

Coordinates: 39.6643989°N 93.5884976°W

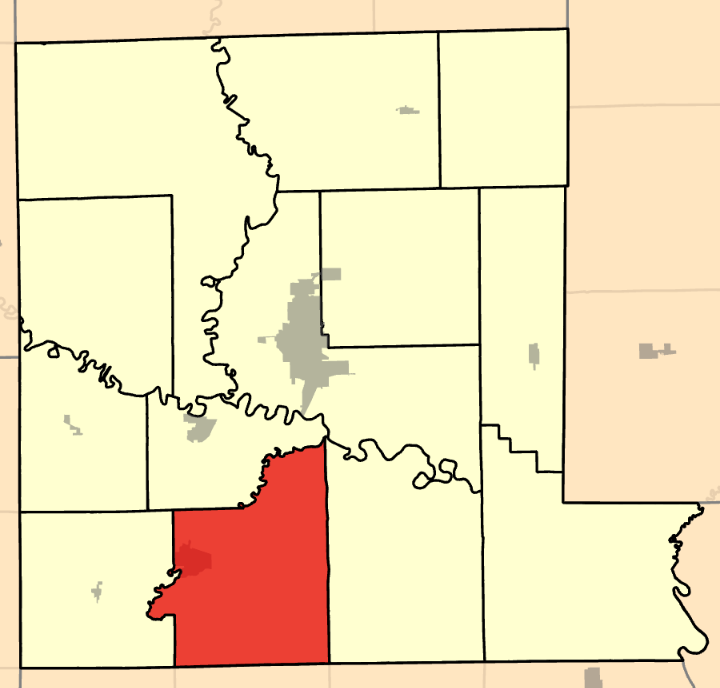

Blue Mound Township is a township in Livingston County, in the U.S. state of Missouri.

Blue Mound Township was established in 1843, and named for a summit within its borders which appears blue when viewed from afar.
