= Monroe Township, Livingston County, Missouri =

Township in Livingston County, Missouri, U.S.

Coordinates: 39.65°N 93.70°W

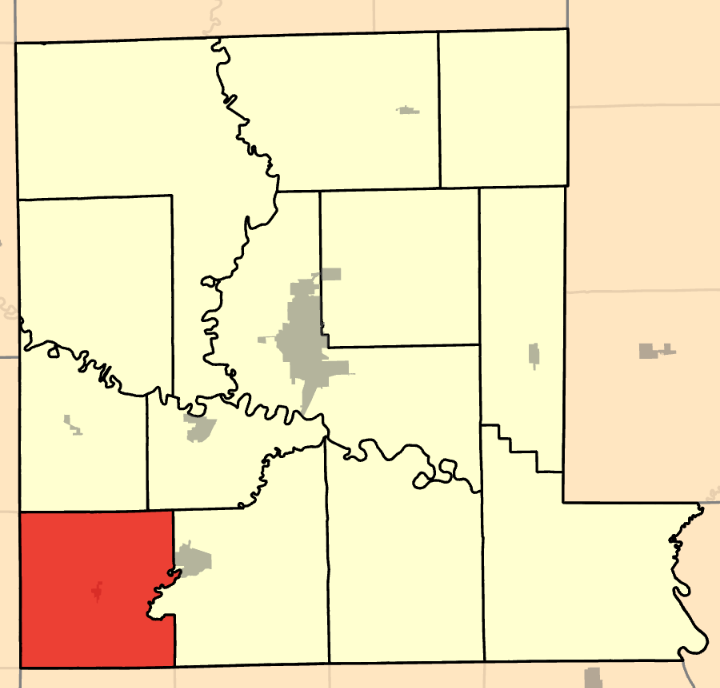

Monroe Township is a township in Livingston County, in the U.S. state of Missouri.

Monroe Township was established in February 1839 and has the name of James Monroe. The northern portion of this township was split off to create Green Township in April 1839.
