= Grand River Township, Livingston County, Missouri =

Township in Livingston County, Missouri, U.S.

Coordinates: 39.65°N 93.34°W

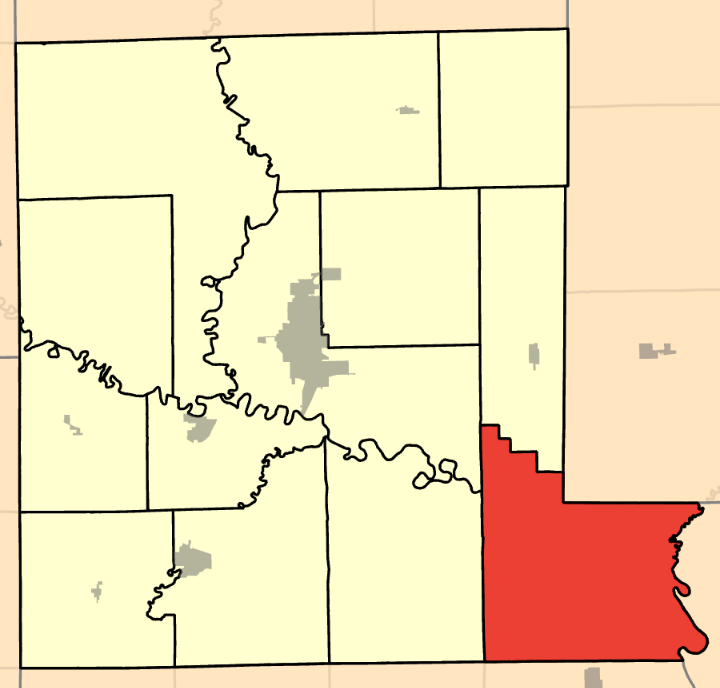

Grand River Township is a township in Livingston County, Missouri, United States.
