= Farmersville, Missouri =

Unincorporated community in Missouri, U.S.

Coordinates: 39°57′39″N 93°32′31″W

Farmersville is an unincorporated community in Livingston County, in the U.S. state of Missouri.

== History ==
Farmersville was laid out in 1870, and named for its location in an agricultural region. A post office called Farmersville was established in 1867, and remained in operation until 1901.
