= Ray and Faye Copeland =

American serial killer duo

Ray Copeland
- Born: December 30, 1914; Oklahoma, U.S.
- Died: October 19, 1993 (aged 78); Potosi Correctional Center, Potosi, Missouri, U.S.
- Occupation: Cattle farmer
- Spouse: Faye Della Wilson Copeland (1940–1993, his death)
- Conviction: First degree murder (5 counts)
- Penalty: Death

Details
- Victims: 5–12
- Span of crimes: 1986–1989
- Country: United States
- State: Missouri
- Date apprehended: October 17, 1989

Faye Della Wilson Copeland
- Born: Faye Della Wilson; August 4, 1921; Harrison, Arkansas, U.S.
- Died: December 23, 2003 (aged 82); Chillicothe, Missouri, U.S.
- Occupations: Factory Worker, Motel Maid and Nanny for Neela Patel and her children Samir and Amy
- Spouse: Ray Copeland (1940–1993, his death)
- Status: Deceased
- Conviction: First degree murder (5 counts)
- Penalty: Death; commuted to life imprisonment

Details
- Victims: 5–12
- Span of crimes: 1986–1989
- Country: United States
- State: Missouri
- Date apprehended: October 17, 1989

Faye Della Copeland (née Wilson; August 4, 1921 – December 23, 2003) and Raymond W. Copeland (December 30, 1914 – October 19, 1993) became, at the ages of 69 and 76 respectively, the oldest couple ever sentenced to death in the United States. They were convicted of killing five drifters at their farm in Mooresville, Missouri. When her sentence was commuted to life in prison in 1999, Faye Copeland was the oldest woman on death row.

== History ==
Ray Copeland was born in Oklahoma in 1914. While he was growing up, his family moved around, struggling to survive during the Great Depression. As a young man, he began a life of petty crime, stealing livestock and forging checks, until he was caught and served a year in jail. After his release in 1940, he met Faye Wilson, and they were married soon afterward. They quickly had several children and, thanks to Ray's criminal reputation, had to keep moving their family around while money was tight. During this time, Ray served several jail sentences until he finally came up with a plan to improve his illegal money-making methods so as to be undetected.

Because Ray was well known as a fraud, he could not buy and sell cattle on his own. To get around this problem, he began to pick up drifters and hobos and employed them as farmhands on his property in Mooresville, Missouri. He would take his employees to the market, where they would use his bad checks to buy the cattle for him. After the transactions, Ray would sell the cattle quickly and the farmhands would disappear without a trace. For a while, the scam worked, but the police caught up and Ray was once again sent to jail.

Upon his release, he resumed his criminal activities, but this time he made sure his farmhands were not as connected to him as before. This went on until a previous employee, Jack McCormick, called the Crime Stoppers hotline in August 1989 to tell them about the Copelands. McCormick claimed that he had seen human bones on their farm while he was employed there and also claimed that Ray had tried to kill him.

Police were initially skeptical of the claims, but after checking Ray's criminal record, they decided to investigate further. In October 1989, dozens of officers accompanied by a team of bloodhounds visited the Copeland farm with a search warrant. Initially, they did not find any incriminating evidence, but after further searching, the bodies of three young men were discovered in a nearby barn. As the search continued, more bodies were found, all killed with the same weapon: a .22 caliber Marlin rifle that was later found in the Copeland home.

It became clear that Ray killed his employees in the pursuit of money, but Faye's actions were initially questioned. When she went to trial in November 1990, her defense mounted a picture of her as a dutiful wife and mother who had endured beatings and general ill-treatment from her husband. However, the jury convicted her of five counts of first degree murder. She was given four death sentences for the murders and one life sentence.

In March 1991, Ray went on trial, was convicted of five counts of murder, and sentenced to death. Upon hearing that Faye had been sentenced to death by lethal injection as well, Ray showed no emotion and replied "Well, those things happen to some, you know."

Ray died of natural causes on October 19, 1993. His body was cremated. Faye's attorneys appealed her conviction, contending that the jury had not been allowed to hear evidence that Ray had abused her for years. On August 6, 1999, Judge Ortrie D. Smith overturned the death sentence, but let the convictions stand and commuted her sentence to five consecutive terms of life without parole.

On August 10, 2002, Faye suffered a stroke that left her partially paralyzed and unable to speak. Weeks later, in September 2002, Governor Bob Holden authorized medical parole for Faye, fulfilling her one wish that she not die in prison. She was paroled to a nursing home in her hometown of Chillicothe, Missouri, where she died of natural causes at the age of 82 the following year. She left behind five children and 17 grandchildren.

== Known victims ==
- Dennis K. Murphy of Normal, Illinois; killed October 17, 1986
- Wayne Warner of Bloomington, Illinois; killed November 19, 1986
- Jimmy Dale Harvey, 27 of Springfield, Missouri; killed October 25, 1988
- John W. Freeman, 27 of Boonville, Indiana; killed December 8, 1988
- Paul J. Cowart, 20 of Dardanelle, Arkansas; killed May 3 or 4, 1989

== In other media ==
The Copelands' story has been fictionalized in the graphic novel Family Bones, written by Ray's great-nephew Shawn Granger. The play Temporary Help by David Wiltse, which appeared off-Broadway in 2004, was based on this story.

The case was documented in multiple television series, such as Forensic Files, Wicked Attraction, Becoming Evil: Sisterhood of Murder and The New Detectives.

It is speculated that the 2022 film X is loosely based on the killings committed by the Copelands.

== See also ==
- List of serial killers in the United States
- List of serial killers by number of victims
