= Livingston County, Missouri =

County in Missouri, United States

- County
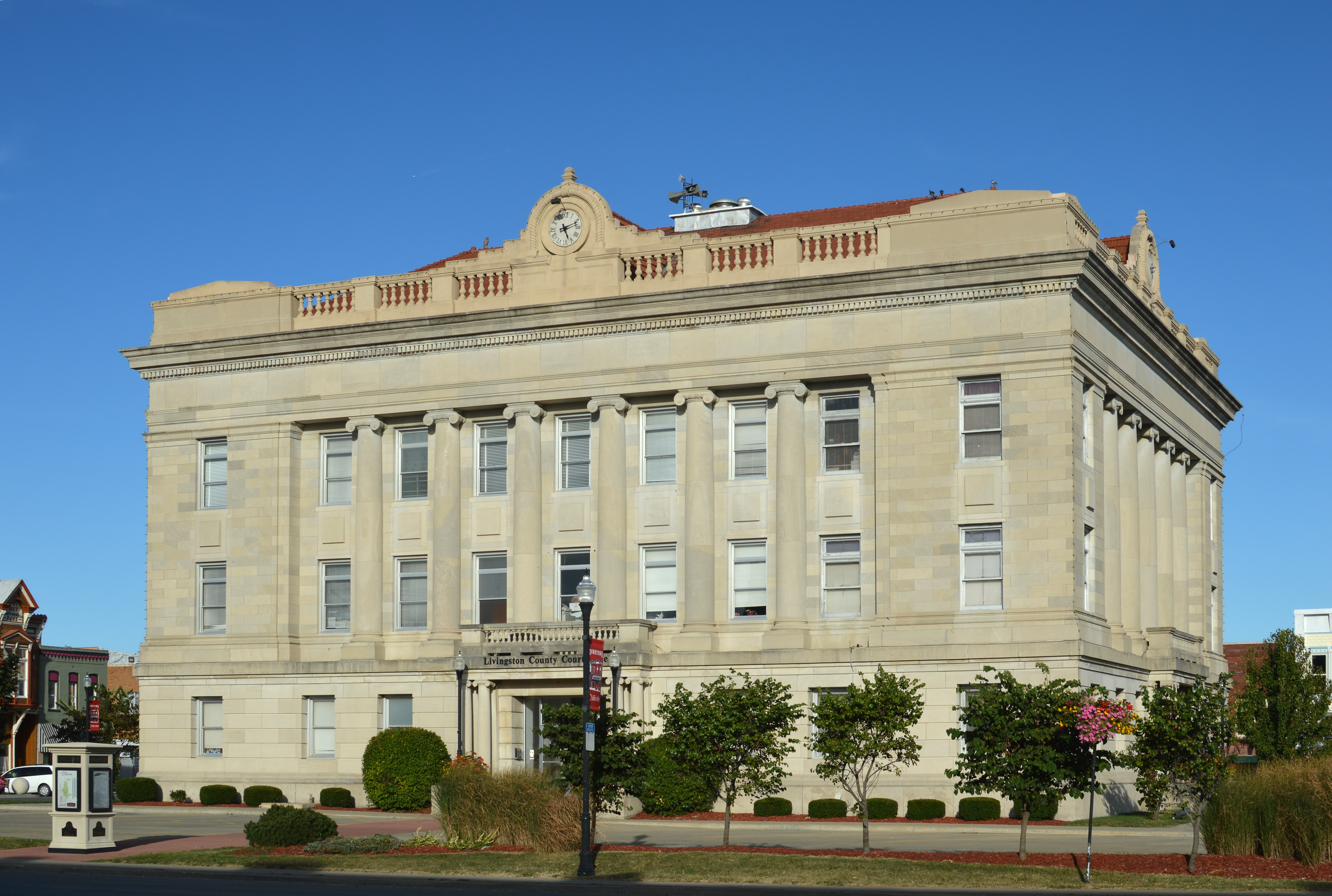
- Livingston County Courthouse in Chillicothe

- Location within the U.S. state of Missouri
- Coordinates: 39°47′N 93°33′W
- Country: United States
- State: Missouri
- Founded: January 6, 1837
- Named for: Edward Livingston
- Seat: Chillicothe
- Largest city: Chillicothe

Area
  - Total: 539 sq mi (1,400 km^{2})
  - Land: 532 sq mi (1,380 km^{2})
  - Water: 6.2 sq mi (16 km^{2}) 1.2%

Population (2020)
  - Total: 14,557
  - Estimate (2025): 14,708 ▲
  - Density: 27.4/sq mi (10.6/km^{2})
- Time zone: UTC−6 (Central)
  - Summer (DST): UTC−5 (CDT)
- Congressional district: 6th
- Website: www.livingstoncountymo.gov

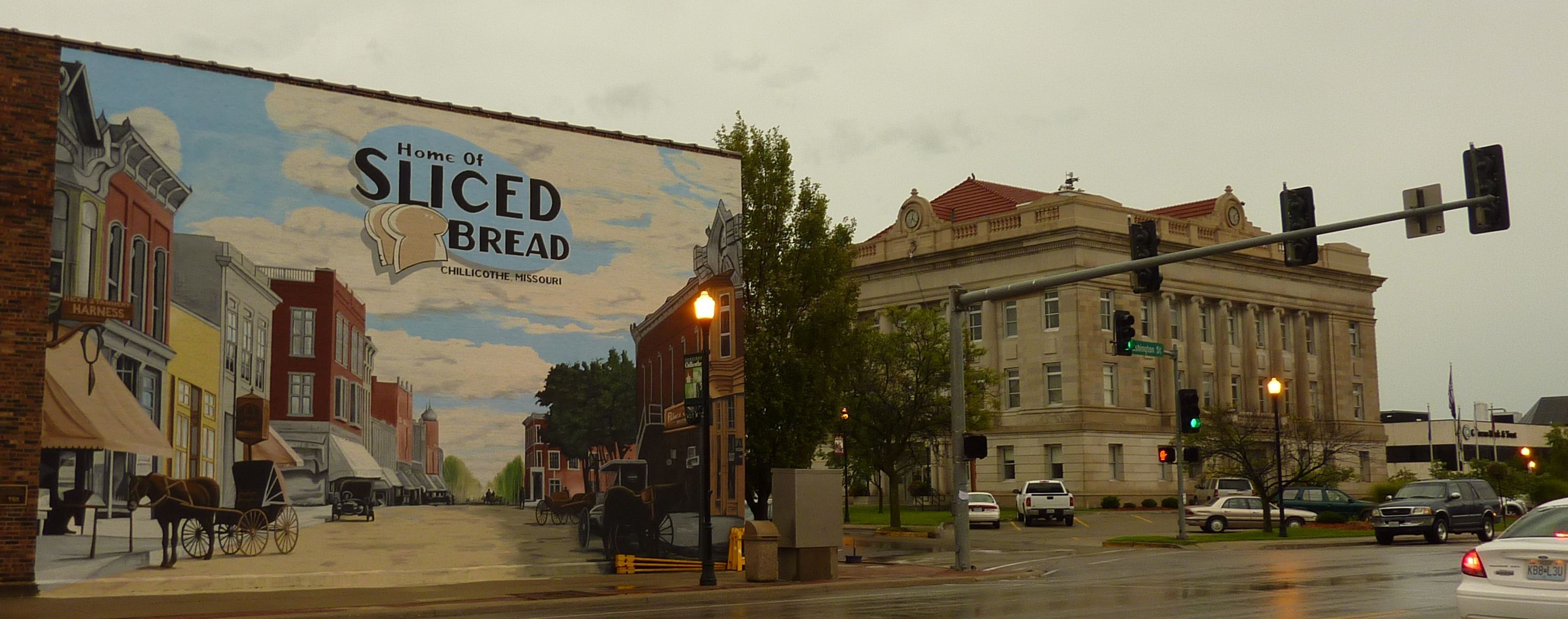
County seat Chillicothe is the birthplace of sliced bread

Livingston County is a county located in the northwestern portion of the U.S. state of Missouri. As of the 2020 census, the population was 14,557. Its county seat is Chillicothe. The county was organized January 6, 1837, and named for U.S. Secretary of State Edward Livingston.

== Geography ==
According to the U.S. Census Bureau, the county has a total area of 539 square miles (1,400 km^{2}), of which 532 square miles (1,380 km^{2}) is land and 6.2 square miles (16 km^{2}) (1.2%) is water.

=== Adjacent counties ===
- Grundy County (north)
- Linn County (east)
- Chariton County (southeast)
- Carroll County (south)
- Caldwell County (southwest)
- Daviess County (northwest)

=== Major highways ===
- Future I-72 / US 36 / Route 110 (CKC)
  - US 36 Bus. (Chillicothe)
- US 65
- Route 190

== Demographics ==
Historical population
Census	Pop.	Note	%±
1840	4,325		—
1850	4,247		−1.8%
1860	7,417		74.6%
1870	16,730		125.6%
1880	20,196		20.7%
1890	20,668		2.3%
1900	22,302		7.9%
1910	19,453		−12.8%
1920	18,857		−3.1%
1930	18,615		−1.3%
1940	18,000		−3.3%
1950	16,532		−8.2%
1960	15,771		−4.6%
1970	15,368		−2.6%
1980	15,739		2.4%
1990	14,592		−7.3%
2000	14,588		0.0%
2010	15,195		4.2%
2020	14,557		−4.2%
2025 (est.)	14,708	▲	1.0%
U.S. Decennial Census; 1790-1960 1900-1990; 1990-2000 2010-2015

=== 2020 census ===
As of the 2020 census, the county had a population of 14,557 and a median age of 41.5 years. 21.2% of residents were under the age of 18 and 21.1% of residents were 65 years of age or older. For every 100 females there were 80.5 males, and for every 100 females age 18 and over there were 74.8 males age 18 and over.

The racial makeup of the county was 92.6% White, 2.2% Black or African American, 0.3% American Indian and Alaska Native, 0.6% Asian, 0.0% Native Hawaiian and Pacific Islander, 0.4% from some other race, and 3.9% from two or more races. Hispanic or Latino residents of any race comprised 1.6% of the population.

62.7% of residents lived in urban areas, while 37.3% lived in rural areas.

There were 5,562 households in the county, of which 28.1% had children under the age of 18 living with them and 25.9% had a female householder with no spouse or partner present. About 31.3% of all households were made up of individuals and 15.2% had someone living alone who was 65 years of age or older.

There were 6,350 housing units, of which 12.4% were vacant. Among occupied housing units, 68.4% were owner-occupied and 31.6% were renter-occupied. The homeowner vacancy rate was 2.6% and the rental vacancy rate was 9.7%.

=== Racial and ethnic composition ===
The following table documents the county's racial and ethnic composition across multiple decennial censuses.

Livingston County, Missouri – Racial and ethnic composition Note: the US Census treats Hispanic/Latino as an ethnic category. This table excludes Latinos from the racial categories and assigns them to a separate category. Hispanics/Latinos may be of any race.
Race / Ethnicity (NH = Non-Hispanic)	Pop 1980	Pop 1990	Pop 2000	Pop 2010	Pop 2020	% 1980	% 1990	% 2000	% 2010	% 2020
White alone (NH)	15,379	14,148	13,911	14,386	13,368	97.71%	96.96%	95.56%	94.68%	91.83%
Black or African American alone (NH)	190	316	331	365	315	1.21%	2.17%	2.27%	2.40%	2.16%
Native American or Alaska Native alone (NH)	19	38	43	45	47	0.12%	0.26%	0.30%	0.30%	0.32%
Asian alone (NH)	63	27	38	40	87	0.40%	0.19%	0.26%	0.26%	0.60%
Native Hawaiian or Pacific Islander alone (NH)	x	x	2	3	5	x	x	0.01%	0.02%	0.03%
Other race alone (NH)	17	0	18	4	19	0.11%	0.00%	0.12%	0.03%	0.13%
Mixed race or Multiracial (NH)	x	x	121	171	477	x	x	0.83%	1.13%	3.28%
Hispanic or Latino (any race)	71	63	94	181	239	0.45%	0.43%	0.65%	1.19%	1.64%
Total	15,739	14,592	14,558	15,195	14,557	100.00%	100.00%	100.00%	100.00%	100.00%

=== 2010 census ===
As of the 2010 census, there were 15,195 people, 5,871 households and 3,834 families residing in the county. The population density was 28 per square mile (11/km^{2}). There were 6,730 housing units at an average density of 12 units per square mile (4.6/km^{2}). The racial makeup of the county was 95.39% White, 2.42% Black or African American, 0.32% Native American, 0.28% Asian, 0.02% Pacific Islander, 0.38% from other races, and 1.20% from two or more races. Approximately 1.19% of the population were Hispanic or Latino of any race.

There were 5,871 households, of which 29.59% had children under the age of 18 living with them, 51.29% were married couples living together, 10.00% had a female householder with no husband present, and 34.70% were non-families. 29.94% of all households were made up of individuals, and 14.43% had someone living alone who was 65 years of age or older. The average household size was 2.36 and the average family size was 2.90.

Age distribution was 21.91% under the age of 18, 7.74% from 18 to 24, 25.34% from 25 to 44, 26.81% from 45 to 64, and 18.20% who were 65 years of age or older. The median age was 41 years. For every 100 females there were 81.02 males. For every 100 females age 18 and over, there were 76.47 males.

The median household income was $39,683, and the median family income was $53,325. Males had a median income of $38,282 versus $24,944 for females. The per capita income for the county was $20,295. About 15.8% of families and 20.6% of the population were below the poverty line, including 34.4% of those under age 18 and 18.4% of those age 65 or over.

== Education ==
=== Public schools ===
- Chillicothe R-II School District – Chillicothe
  - Chillicothe Early Learning Center (PK)
  - Chillicothe Elementary School (K-05)
  - Chillicothe Middle School (06-08)
  - Chillicothe High School (09-12)
  - Grand River Technical School
- Livingston County R-III School District – Chula
  - Livingston County Elementary School (PK-08)
- Southwest R-1 School District – Ludlow
  - Southwest Livingston County Elementary School (PK-06)
  - Southwest Livingston County High School (07-12)

=== Private schools ===
- Bishop Hogan Memorial School – Chillicothe (K-09) – Roman Catholic

=== Public libraries ===
- Livingston County Library

== Communities ==
=== Cities ===
- Chillicothe (county seat)
- Chula
- Wheeling

=== Villages ===
- Ludlow
- Mooresville
- Utica

=== Census-designated places ===
- Avalon
- Dawn

=== Other unincorporated places ===
- Bedford
- Farmersville
- Norville
- Sampsel
- Springhill
- Sturges

=== Townships ===
- Blue Mound
- Chillicothe
- Cream Ridge
- Fairview
- Grand River
- Green
- Jackson
- Medicine
- Monroe
- Mooresville
- Rich Hill
- Sampsel
- Wheeling

== Notable people ==
- Bower Slack Broaddus, U.S. Federal Judge
- Courtney W. Campbell, U.S. Representative from Florida (1953-1955)
- Ray and Faye Copeland, serial killers
- Claude B. Hutchison, botanist, professor, and Mayor of Berkeley, California (1955-1963)
- Mike Lair, Missouri State Representative (2009–2016) and former teacher
- Jerry Litton, U.S. Representative from Missouri (1973-1976)
- Charles H. Mansur, U.S. Representative from Missouri (1887-1893)
- Shirley Collie Nelson, country music artist/actress
- Henry Moses Pollard, U.S. Representative from Missouri (1877-1879)
- John Quinn, Missouri State Representative (2001-2009)
- William Y. Slack, brigadier general and politician
- Clarence Edwin Watkins, publisher

== Politics ==
=== Local ===
The Republican Party predominantly controls politics at the local level in Livingston County. Republicans hold a majority of the elected positions in the county.

Livingston County, Missouri

Elected countywide officials
Assessor	Steve Ripley	Democratic
Circuit Clerk	Jane Gann	Republican
County Clerk	Sherry Parks	Democratic
Collector	Diana Havens	Republican
Commissioner (presiding)	Ed Douglas	Republican
Commissioner (district 1)	Alvin Thompson	Republican
Commissioner (district 2)	Dave Mapel	Republican
Coroner	J. Scott Lindley	Democratic
Prosecuting Attorney	Adam L. Warren	Republican
Public Administrator	Geri Curtis	Republican
Recorder	Amy Baker	Democratic
Sheriff	Dustin Woelfle	Republican
Surveyor	Vacant	N/A
Treasurer	Diana Havens	Republican

=== State ===
Past Gubernatorial Elections Results
Year	Republican	Democratic	Third Parties
2024	78.76% 5,295	19.57% 1,316	1.67% 112
2020	78.37% 5,258	19.85% 1,332	1.77% 119
2016	66.09% 4,189	31.43% 1,992	2.48% 157
2012	48.72% 2,922	48.46% 2,906	2.82% 169
2008	43.74% 2,830	54.40% 3,520	1.86% 120
2004	58.25% 3,680	40.84% 2,580	0.92% 58
2000	51.99% 3,236	46.16% 2,873	1.85% 115
1996	29.66% 1,798	68.54% 4,155	1.80% 109

All of Livingston County is a part of Missouri's 7th District in the Missouri House of Representatives and is currently represented by Rusty Black (R-Chillicothe).

Missouri House of Representatives — District 7 — Livingston County (2020)
Party	Candidate	Votes	%	±%
Republican	Rusty Black	6,152	100.00%	+16.86

Missouri House of Representatives — District 7 — Livingston County (2018)
Party	Candidate	Votes	%	±%
Republican	Rusty Black	4,274	83.14%	−16.86
Democratic	Dennis VanDyke	867	16.86%	+16.86

All of Livingston County is a part of Missouri's 21st District in the Missouri Senate and is currently represented by Denny Hoskins (R-Warrensburg).

Missouri Senate — District 21 — Livingston County (2020)
Party	Candidate	Votes	%	±%
Republican	Denny Hoskins	5,566	88.45%	+12.68
Libertarian	Mark Bliss	727	11.55%	+7.00

Missouri Senate — District 21 — Livingston County (2016)
Party	Candidate	Votes	%	±%
Republican	Denny Hoskins	4,575	75.77%	+7.67
Democratic	ElGene Ver Dught	1,188	19.68%	−7.92
Libertarian	Bill Wayne	275	4.55%	+0.25

=== Federal ===
All of Livingston County is included in Missouri's 6th Congressional District and is currently represented by Sam Graves (R-Tarkio) in the U.S. House of Representatives. Graves was elected to an eleventh term in 2020 over Democratic challenger Gena Ross.

U.S. House of Representatives – Missouri’s 6th Congressional District – Livingston County (2020)
Party	Candidate	Votes	%	±%
Republican	Sam Graves	5,536	83.05%	+3.44
Democratic	Gena L. Ross	1,040	15.60%	−3.11
Libertarian	Jim Higgins	90	1.35%	−0.34

U.S. House of Representatives – Missouri's 6th Congressional District – Livingston County (2018)
Party	Candidate	Votes	%	±%
Republican	Sam Graves	4,107	79.61%	+0.05
Democratic	Henry Robert Martin	965	18.71%	+0.98
Libertarian	Dan Hogan	87	1.69%	−0.13

Livingston County, along with the rest of the state of Missouri, is represented in the U.S. Senate by Josh Hawley (R-Columbia) and Roy Blunt (R-Strafford).

U.S. Senate – Class I – Livingston County (2018)
Party	Candidate	Votes	%	±%
Republican	Josh Hawley	3,565	68.72%	+25.19
Democratic	Claire McCaskill	1,445	27.85%	−20.47
Independent	Craig O'Dear	80	1.54%	
Libertarian	Japheth Campbell	72	1.39%	−6.76
Green	Jo Crain	26	0.50%	+0.50

Blunt was elected to a second term in 2016 over then-Missouri Secretary of State Jason Kander.

U.S. Senate — Class III — Livingston County (2016)
Party	Candidate	Votes	%	±%
Republican	Roy Blunt	3,834	60.41%	+16.88
Democratic	Jason Kander	2,208	34.79%	−13.53
Libertarian	Jonathan Dine	158	2.49%	−5.66
Green	Johnathan McFarland	76	1.20%	+1.20
Constitution	Fred Ryman	71	1.12%	+1.12

=== Political Culture ===
United States presidential election results for Livingston County, Missouri
Year	Republican		Democratic		Third party(ies)	
Year	No.	%	No.	%	No.	%
1888	2,031	42.73%	2,082	43.80%	640	13.47%
1892	1,958	39.01%	2,190	43.63%	871	17.35%
1896	2,377	41.00%	3,351	57.81%	69	1.19%
1900	2,493	45.31%	2,659	48.33%	350	6.36%
1904	2,480	48.10%	2,356	45.69%	320	6.21%
1908	2,400	48.92%	2,379	48.49%	127	2.59%
1912	885	18.37%	2,314	48.04%	1,618	33.59%
1916	2,424	47.45%	2,609	51.07%	76	1.49%
1920	5,093	57.51%	3,666	41.40%	97	1.10%
1924	4,517	50.26%	4,316	48.02%	155	1.72%
1928	5,742	63.94%	3,221	35.87%	17	0.19%
1932	3,659	43.40%	4,742	56.24%	30	0.36%
1936	4,678	47.04%	5,226	52.55%	40	0.40%
1940	5,298	53.21%	4,633	46.53%	25	0.25%
1944	4,697	54.55%	3,887	45.15%	26	0.30%
1948	3,835	47.75%	4,182	52.07%	14	0.17%
1952	5,594	59.77%	3,757	40.14%	8	0.09%
1956	5,165	57.71%	3,785	42.29%	0	0.00%
1960	5,045	57.07%	3,795	42.93%	0	0.00%
1964	2,703	33.69%	5,320	66.31%	0	0.00%
1968	3,827	48.99%	3,467	44.38%	518	6.63%
1972	5,253	66.37%	2,662	33.63%	0	0.00%
1976	3,010	43.90%	3,819	55.69%	28	0.41%
1980	3,654	50.26%	3,368	46.33%	248	3.41%
1984	4,090	60.24%	2,699	39.76%	0	0.00%
1988	3,462	52.88%	3,077	47.00%	8	0.12%
1992	2,370	34.53%	2,505	36.50%	1,988	28.97%
1996	2,384	38.89%	2,913	47.52%	833	13.59%
2000	3,709	59.10%	2,425	38.64%	142	2.26%
2004	4,029	63.49%	2,278	35.90%	39	0.61%
2008	3,993	60.94%	2,435	37.16%	124	1.89%
2012	4,006	66.17%	1,906	31.48%	142	2.35%
2016	4,879	75.99%	1,265	19.70%	277	4.31%
2020	5,267	77.94%	1,410	20.86%	81	1.20%
2024	5,395	78.50%	1,422	20.69%	56	0.81%

At the presidential level, Livingston County has become solidly Republican in recent years. Bill Clinton was the last Democratic presidential nominee to carry Livingston County in 1996 with a plurality of the vote, and a Democrat hasn't won majority support from the county's voters in a presidential election since Jimmy Carter in 1976.

Like most rural areas throughout northern Missouri, voters in Livingston County generally adhere to socially and culturally conservative principles which tend to influence their Republican leanings, at least on the state and national levels. Despite support for socially conservative platforms, voters in the county have a penchant for advancing populist causes. In 2018, Missourians voted on a proposition (Proposition A) concerning right to work, the outcome of which ultimately reversed the right to work legislation passed in the state the previous year. 67.72% of Livingston County voters cast their ballots to overturn the law.

=== Missouri presidential preference primaries ===
==== 2020 ====
The 2020 presidential primaries for both the Democratic and Republican parties were held in Missouri on March 10. On the Democratic side, former Vice President Joe Biden (D-Delaware) both won statewide and carried Livingston County by a wide margin. Biden went on to defeat Trump in the general election.

Missouri Democratic Presidential Primary – Livingston County (2020)
Party	Candidate	Votes	%	±%
Democratic	Joe Biden	583	68.83	
Democratic	Bernie Sanders	202	23.85	
Democratic	Tulsi Gabbard	11	1.30	
Democratic	Others/Uncommitted	51	6.02	

Incumbent President Donald Trump (R-Florida) faced a primary challenge from former Massachusetts Governor Bill Weld, but won both Livingston County and statewide by large margins.

Missouri Republican Presidential Primary – Livingston County (2020)
Party	Candidate	Votes	%	±%
Republican	Donald Trump	875	97.66	
Republican	Bill Weld	5	0.56	
Republican	Others/Uncommitted	16	1.79	

==== 2016 ====
The 2016 presidential primaries for both the Republican and Democratic parties were held in Missouri on March 15. Businessman Donald Trump (R-New York) narrowly won the state overall and won a plurality of the vote in Livingston County. He went on to win the presidency.

Missouri Republican Presidential Primary – Livingston County (2016)
Party	Candidate	Votes	%	±%
Republican	Donald Trump	1,191	46.06	
Republican	Ted Cruz	886	34.26	
Republican	John Kasich	261	10.09	
Republican	Marco Rubio	150	5.80	
Republican	Others/Uncommitted	98	3.79	

On the Democratic side, former Secretary of State Hillary Clinton (D-New York) narrowly won statewide, but Senator Bernie Sanders (I-Vermont) carried Livingston County by a single vote.

Missouri Democratic Presidential Primary – Livingston County (2016)
Party	Candidate	Votes	%	±%
Democratic	Bernie Sanders	398	48.60	
Democratic	Hillary Clinton	397	48.47	
Democratic	Others/Uncommitted	24	2.93	

==== 2012 ====
The 2012 Missouri Republican Presidential Primary's results were nonbinding on the state's national convention delegates. Voters in Livingston County supported former U.S. Senator Rick Santorum (R-Pennsylvania), who finished first in the state at large, but eventually lost the nomination to former Governor Mitt Romney (R-Massachusetts). Delegates to the congressional district and state conventions were chosen at a county caucus, which selected a delegation favoring former U.S. House Speaker Newt Gingrich. Incumbent President Barack Obama easily won the Missouri Democratic Primary and renomination. He defeated Romney in the general election.

==== 2008 ====
In 2008, the Missouri Republican Presidential Primary was closely contested, with Senator John McCain (R-Arizona) prevailing and eventually winning the nomination.

Missouri Republican Presidential Primary – Livingston County (2008)
Party	Candidate	Votes	%	±%
Republican	John McCain	488	38.88	
Republican	Mike Huckabee	426	33.94	
Republican	Mitt Romney	248	19.76	
Republican	Ron Paul	75	5.98	
Republican	Others/Uncommitted	18	1.44	

Then-Senator Hillary Clinton (D-New York) received more votes than any candidate from either party in Livingston County during the 2008 presidential primary. Despite initial reports that Clinton had won Missouri, Barack Obama (D-Illinois), also a Senator at the time, narrowly defeated her statewide and later became that year's Democratic nominee, going on to win the presidency.

Missouri Democratic Presidential Primary – Livingston County (2008)
Party	Candidate	Votes	%	±%
Democratic	Hillary Clinton	948	59.85	
Democratic	Barack Obama	550	34.72	
Democratic	Others/Uncommitted	86	5.43	

== See also ==
- Hawn's Mill massacre
- Mormon War (1838)
- National Register of Historic Places listings in Livingston County, Missouri
