= Upper Bridge (Warsaw, Missouri) =

- U.S. National Register of Historic Places
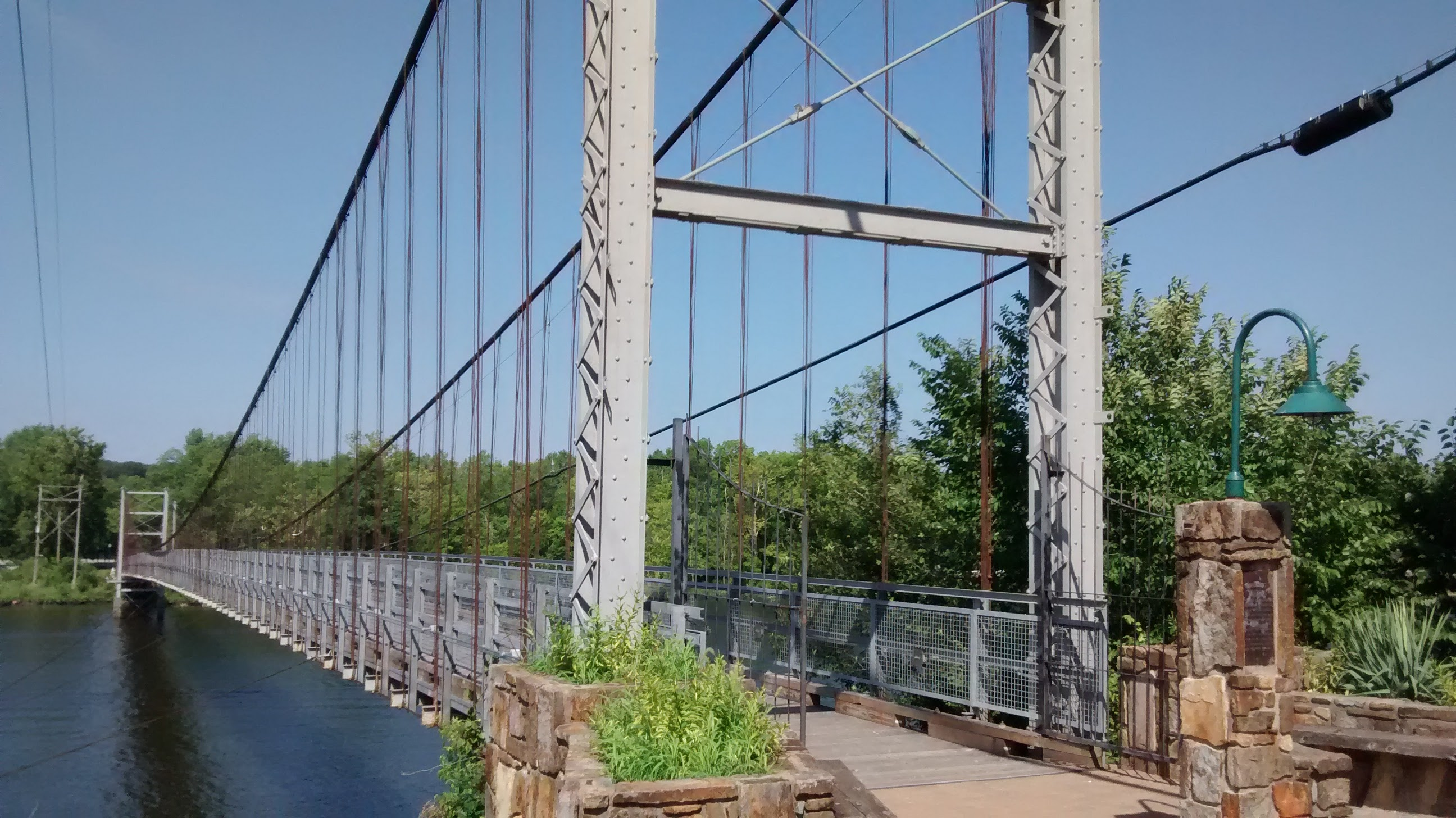

- Location within Missouri Location within the United States
- Location: Old Highway A, over Osage River, Warsaw, Missouri
- Coordinates: 38°14′39″N 93°23′16″W
- Area: less than one acre
- Built: 1928
- Built by: Dice, Joseph; Eddy, Daniel M.
- NRHP reference No.: 99001159
- Added to NRHP: September 17, 1999

Upper Bridge, also known as the Warsaw Swinging Bridge, is a historic cable suspension bridge located at Warsaw, Benton County, Missouri. It originally opened in 1904 and rebuilt in 1928 after a tornado in 1924. It measures 600 feet (180 m) long, and spans the Osage River. It has a 500-foot (150 m) span between steel towers.

It was listed on the National Register of Historic Places in 1999.

== See also ==
- List of bridges documented by the Historic American Engineering Record in Missouri
- National Register of Historic Places in Benton County, Missouri
