= Alton Bridge =

Former railroad bridge across the Mississippi River

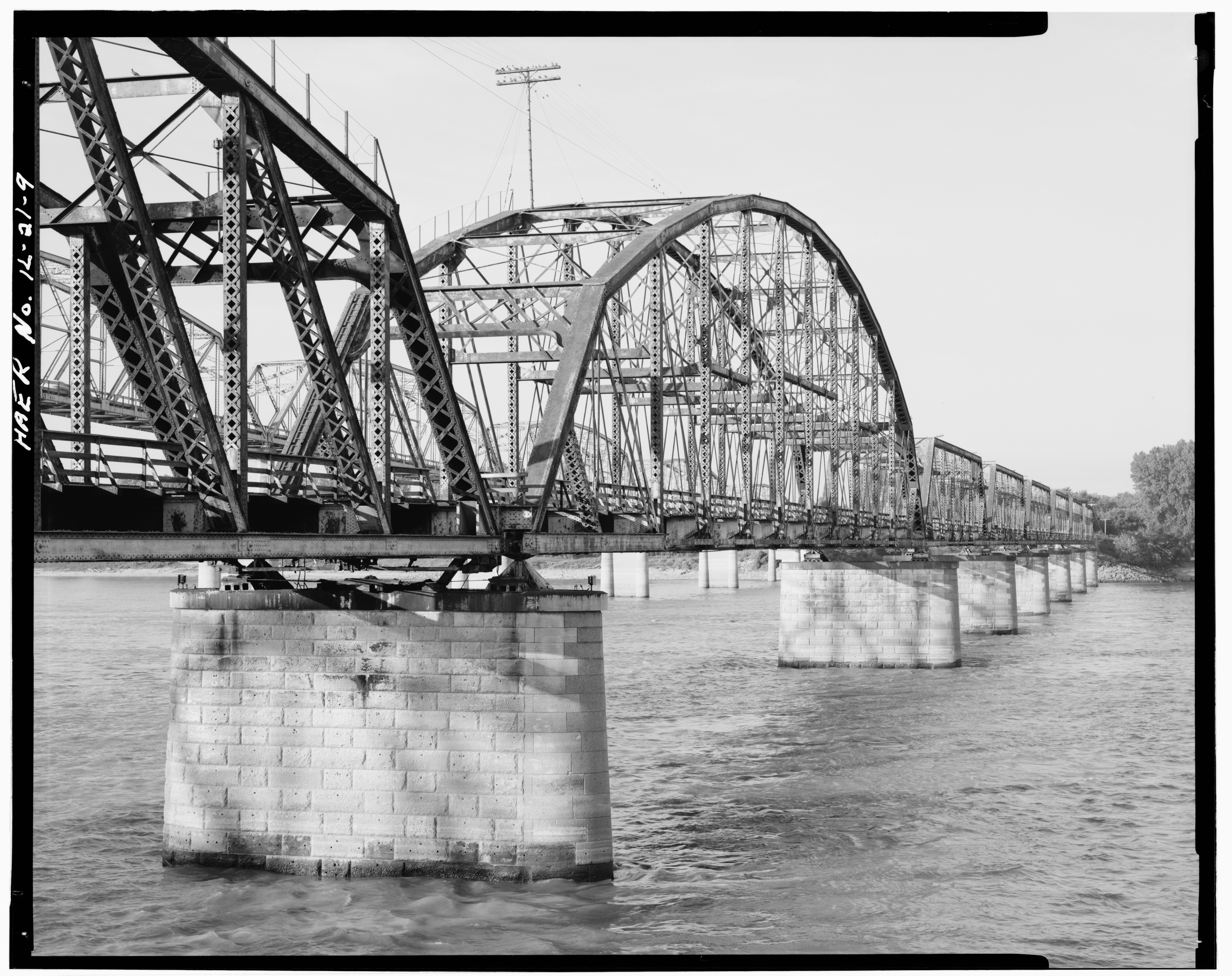
- Coordinates: 38.8841°N 90.1846°W
- Carries: Single-track rail line
- Crosses: Mississippi River
- Locale: West Alton, Missouri, and Alton, Illinois

Characteristics
- Design: Truss bridge

Location
- Interactive map of Alton Bridge

The Alton Bridge was a railroad bridge that carried the Chicago, Burlington, and Quincy (later Burlington Northern) across the Mississippi River between West Alton, Missouri, and Alton, Illinois. It was located 100 yards (91 m) upriver from, and parallel to, the Old Clark Bridge. The bridge was built between 1892 and 1894 and was removed shortly after the line was abandoned in 1988. With a total length of 2,060 feet (630 m), it consisted of eight through-truss segments—six Pratt trusses, one Pennsylvania truss, and one pivot-swinging truss.

== See also ==
- List of bridges documented by the Historic American Engineering Record in Illinois
- List of bridges documented by the Historic American Engineering Record in Missouri
- List of crossings of the Upper Mississippi River
- Lock and Dam No. 26 (historical)
