= Utica, Missouri =

- Village
- Location of Utica, Missouri
- Coordinates: 39°44′36″N 93°37′39″W
- Country: United States
- State: Missouri
- County: Livingston

Area
  - Total: 0.86 sq mi (2.22 km^{2})
  - Land: 0.86 sq mi (2.22 km^{2})
  - Water: 0 sq mi (0.00 km^{2})
- Elevation: 761 ft (232 m)

Population (2020)
  - Total: 222
  - Density: 258.6/sq mi (99.86/km^{2})
- Time zone: UTC-6 (Central (CST))
  - Summer (DST): UTC-5 (CDT)
- ZIP code: 64686
- Area code: 660
- FIPS code: 29-75364
- GNIS feature ID: 0728091

Utica is a village in Livingston County, Missouri, United States. The population was 222 at the 2020 census.

== History ==
Utica was platted in 1837, and named after Utica, New York, the native home of an early settler.

== Geography ==
Utica is located at 39°44′36″N 93°37′39″W (39.743366, -93.627440).

According to the United States Census Bureau, the village has a total area of 0.87 square miles (2.25 km^{2}), all land.

== Demographics ==
Historical population
Census	Pop.	Note	%±
1880	722		—
1990	299		—
2000	274		−8.4%
2010	269		−1.8%
2020	222		−17.5%
U.S. Decennial Census

=== 2010 census ===
As of the census of 2010, there were 269 people, 106 households, and 79 families living in the village. The population density was 309.2 inhabitants per square mile (119.4/km^{2}). There were 121 housing units at an average density of 139.1 per square mile (53.7/km^{2}). The racial makeup of the village was 98.5% White, 0.4% Native American, 0.4% from other races, and 0.7% from two or more races. Hispanic or Latino of any race were 2.2% of the population.

There were 106 households, of which 25.5% had children under the age of 18 living with them, 61.3% were married couples living together, 7.5% had a female householder with no husband present, 5.7% had a male householder with no wife present, and 25.5% were non-families. 17.0% of all households were made up of individuals, and 7.5% had someone living alone who was 65 years of age or older. The average household size was 2.54 and the average family size was 2.89.

The median age in the village was 43.7 years. 18.6% of residents were under the age of 18; 9.7% were between the ages of 18 and 24; 24.4% were from 25 to 44; 33.1% were from 45 to 64; and 14.1% were 65 years of age or older. The gender makeup of the village was 52.4% male and 47.6% female.

=== 2000 census ===
As of the census of 2000, there were 274 people, 101 households, and 79 families living in the village. The population density was 310.7 inhabitants per square mile (120.0/km^{2}). There were 120 housing units at an average density of 136.1 per square mile (52.5/km^{2}). The racial makeup of the village was 99.64% White and 0.36% African American. Hispanic or Latino of any race were 0.73% of the population.

There were 101 households, out of which 32.7% had children under the age of 18 living with them, 66.3% were married couples living together, 5.9% had a female householder with no husband present, and 20.8% were non-families. 16.8% of all households were made up of individuals, and 7.9% had someone living alone who was 65 years of age or older. The average household size was 2.71 and the average family size was 3.03.

In the village, the population was spread out, with 25.9% under the age of 18, 8.4% from 18 to 24, 26.3% from 25 to 44, 25.5% from 45 to 64, and 13.9% who were 65 years of age or older. The median age was 37 years. For every 100 females, there were 117.5 males. For every 100 females age 18 and over, there were 113.7 males.

The median income for a household in the village was $38,750, and the median income for a family was $41,458. Males had a median income of $31,667 versus $18,125 for females. The per capita income for the village was $16,860. About 8.2% of families and 9.6% of the population were below the poverty line, including 15.5% of those under the age of eighteen and 8.6% of those 65 or over.

== Education ==
- Southwest R-1 School District
