= Mooresville, Missouri =

- Village
- Location of Mooresville, Missouri
- Coordinates: 39°44′48″N 93°43′15″W
- Country: United States
- State: Missouri
- County: Livingston

Area
  - Total: 0.18 sq mi (0.46 km^{2})
  - Land: 0.18 sq mi (0.46 km^{2})
  - Water: 0 sq mi (0.00 km^{2})
- Elevation: 915 ft (279 m)

Population (2020)
  - Total: 98
  - Density: 546.6/sq mi (211.04/km^{2})
- Time zone: UTC-6 (Central (CST))
  - Summer (DST): UTC-5 (CDT)
- ZIP code: 64664
- Area code: 660
- FIPS code: 29-49790
- GNIS feature ID: 2399393

Mooresville is a village in western Livingston County, Missouri, United States. The population was 98 at the 2020 census.

== History ==
Mooresville was platted in 1860 by W. B. Moore, and named for him. A post office called Mooresville has been in operation since 1860. The village was incorporated in 1874.

Serial killers Ray and Faye Copeland lured their victims, whom they hired, to their farm in Mooresville before killing them.

== Geography ==
According to the United States Census Bureau, the village has a total area of 0.18 square miles (0.47 km^{2}), all land.

== Demographics ==
Historical population
Census	Pop.	Note	%±
1880	172		—
1910	205		—
1920	193		−5.9%
1930	137		−29.0%
1940	170		24.1%
1950	134		−21.2%
1960	117		−12.7%
1970	131		12.0%
1980	129		−1.5%
1990	100		−22.5%
2000	89		−11.0%
2010	91		2.2%
2020	98		7.7%
U.S. Decennial Census

=== 2010 census ===
As of the census of 2010, there were 91 people, 42 households, and 27 families residing in the village. The population density was 505.6 inhabitants per square mile (195.2/km^{2}). There were 48 housing units at an average density of 266.7 per square mile (103.0/km^{2}). The racial makeup of the village was 100.0% White.

There were 42 households, of which 19.0% had children under the age of 18 living with them, 50.0% were married couples living together, 7.1% had a female householder with no husband present, 7.1% had a male householder with no wife present, and 35.7% were non-families. 31.0% of all households were made up of individuals, and 16.6% had someone living alone who was 65 years of age or older. The average household size was 2.17 and the average family size was 2.63.

The median age in the village was 49.9 years. 17.6% of residents were under the age of 18; 2.2% were between the ages of 18 and 24; 22% were from 25 to 44; 33% were from 45 to 64; and 25.3% were 65 years of age or older. The gender makeup of the village was 48.4% male and 51.6% female.

=== 2000 census ===
As of the census of 2000, there were 89 people, 40 households, and 25 families residing in the village. The population density was 489.8 inhabitants per square mile (189.1/km^{2}). There were 48 housing units at an average density of 264.2 per square mile (102.0/km^{2}). The racial makeup of the village was 100.00% White.

There were 40 households, out of which 22.5% had children under the age of 18 living with them, 60.0% were married couples living together, 2.5% had a female householder with no husband present, and 37.5% were non-families. 35.0% of all households were made up of individuals, and 17.5% had someone living alone who was 65 years of age or older. The average household size was 2.23 and the average family size was 2.92.

In the village, the population was spread out, with 22.5% under the age of 18, 5.6% from 18 to 24, 19.1% from 25 to 44, 27.0% from 45 to 64, and 25.8% who were 65 years of age or older. The median age was 48 years. For every 100 females, there were 85.4 males. For every 100 females age 18 and over, there were 81.6 males.

The median income for a household in the village was $21,875, and the median income for a family was $34,250. Males had a median income of $26,250 versus $13,750 for females. The per capita income for the village was $16,282. There were no families and 2.7% of the population living below the poverty line, including no under eighteens and none of those over 64.
