= Chillicothe Township, Livingston County, Missouri =

Township in Livingston County, Missouri, U.S.

Coordinates: 39.77°N 93.55°W

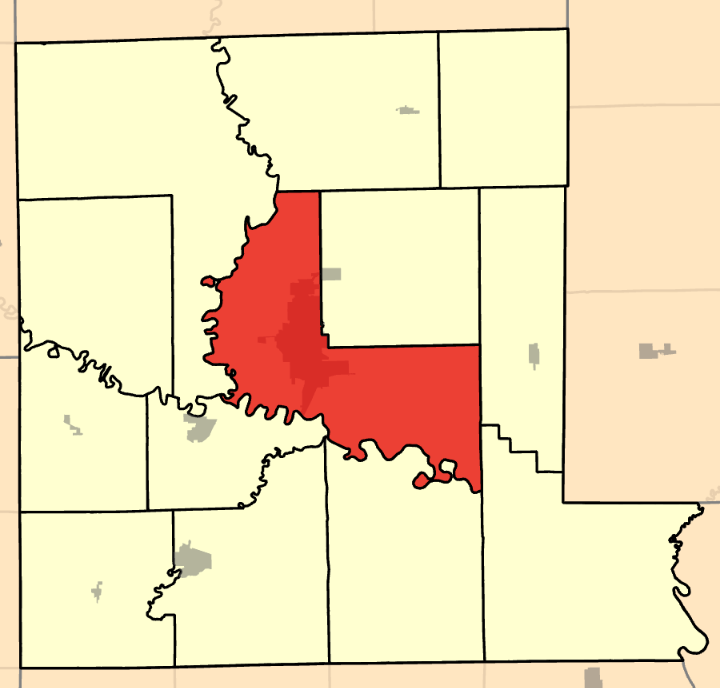

Chillicothe Township is a township in Livingston County, Missouri, United States.

The city and county seat of Chillicothe is located in the center of this township.
