= Norville, Missouri =

Unincorporated community in Missouri, U.S.

Norville
- Unincorporated community
- Interactive map of Norville
- Coordinates: 39°45′16″N 93°28′21″W
- Country: United States
- State: Missouri
- County: Livingston
- Established: 1892
- Post office closed: 1906

Norville is an unincorporated community in Livingston County, in the U.S. state of Missouri.

== History ==
A post office called Norville was established in 1892, and remained in operation until 1906. The community most likely has the name of Captain William N. Norville, an early citizen.
