= Doxies Creek =

Stream in the American state of Missouri

Coordinates: 39°15′52″N 92°51′45″W

Doxies Creek Doxeys Fork

Location
- Country: United States
- State: Missouri
- Counties: Chariton; Howard

Physical characteristics
- Source
  - location: Missouri
- Mouth
  - location: Missouri

Doxies Creek (also known as Doxeys Fork) is a stream in Chariton and Howard counties in the U.S. state of Missouri.

Doxies Creek has the name of John Doxey.

== See also ==
- List of rivers of Missouri
