= Ludlow, Missouri =

- Village
- Location of Ludlow, Missouri
- Coordinates: 39°39′15″N 93°42′09″W
- Country: United States
- State: Missouri
- County: Livingston

Area
  - Total: 0.16 sq mi (0.41 km^{2})
  - Land: 0.16 sq mi (0.41 km^{2})
  - Water: 0 sq mi (0.00 km^{2})
- Elevation: 751 ft (229 m)

Population (2020)
  - Total: 111
  - Density: 708.0/sq mi (273.36/km^{2})
- Time zone: UTC-6 (Central (CST))
  - Summer (DST): UTC-5 (CDT)
- ZIP code: 64656
- Area code: 660
- FIPS code: 29-44390
- GNIS feature ID: 2396727

Ludlow is a village in southwest Livingston County, Missouri, United States. The population was 111 at the 2020 census. The median income in Ludlow is $30,833 and the median home value is $33,500.

== History ==
A post office called Ludlow has been in operation since 1877. It is unclear why the name Ludlow was applied to this community.

Lena Hughes (1904-1998), an influential folk musician known as the "Queen of the Flat-Top Guitar" lived nearly all her life in Ludlow.

== Geography ==
According to the United States Census Bureau, the village has a total area of 0.16 square miles (0.41 km^{2}), all land.

== Demographics ==
Historical population
Census	Pop.	Note	%±
1930	299		—
1940	265		−11.4%
1950	260		−1.9%
1960	235		−9.6%
1970	175		−25.5%
1980	178		1.7%
1990	147		−17.4%
2000	204		38.8%
2010	137		−32.8%
2020	111		−19.0%
U.S. Decennial Census

=== 2010 census ===
As of the census of 2010, there were 137 people, 65 households, and 34 families living in the village. The population density was 856.3 inhabitants per square mile (330.6/km^{2}). There were 96 housing units at an average density of 600.0 per square mile (231.7/km^{2}). The racial makeup of the village was 92.7% White, 2.9% African American, and 4.4% from two or more races.

There were 65 households, of which 26.2% had children under the age of 18 living with them, 40.0% were married couples living together, 9.2% had a female householder with no husband present, 3.1% had a male householder with no wife present, and 47.7% were non-families. 41.5% of all households were made up of individuals, and 13.9% had someone living alone who was 65 years of age or older. The average household size was 2.11 and the average family size was 2.88.

The median age in the village was 35.5 years. 25.5% of residents were under the age of 18; 7.3% were between the ages of 18 and 24; 25.5% were from 25 to 44; 24.7% were from 45 to 64; and 16.8% were 65 years of age or older. The gender makeup of the village was 45.3% male and 54.7% female.

=== 2000 census ===
As of the census of 2000, there were 204 people, 75 households, and 53 families living in the town. The population density was 1,562.3 inhabitants per square mile (603.2/km^{2}). There were 92 housing units at an average density of 704.6 per square mile (272.0/km^{2}). The racial makeup of the town was 97.55% White, 0.49% African American, 0.98% Native American, and 0.98% from two or more races.

There were 75 households, out of which 40.0% had children under the age of 18 living with them, 49.3% were married couples living together, 16.0% had a female householder with no husband present, and 29.3% were non-families. 25.3% of all households were made up of individuals, and 13.3% had someone living alone who was 65 years of age or older. The average household size was 2.72 and the average family size was 3.19.

In the town the population was spread out, with 32.8% under the age of 18, 7.8% from 18 to 24, 32.4% from 25 to 44, 12.3% from 45 to 64, and 14.7% who were 65 years of age or older. The median age was 30 years. For every 100 females, there were 117.0 males. For every 100 females aged 18 and over, there were 98.6 males.

The median income for a household in the town was $19,688, and the median income for a family was $20,000. Males had a median income of $21,250 versus $20,000 for females. The per capita income for the town was $10,118. About 22.2% of families and 27.4% of the population were below the poverty line, including 42.3% of those under the age of 18 and none of those 65 years of age or older.
