= Merchants Bridge =

Bridge of the Mississippi River between St. Louis, Missouri, and Venice, Illinois

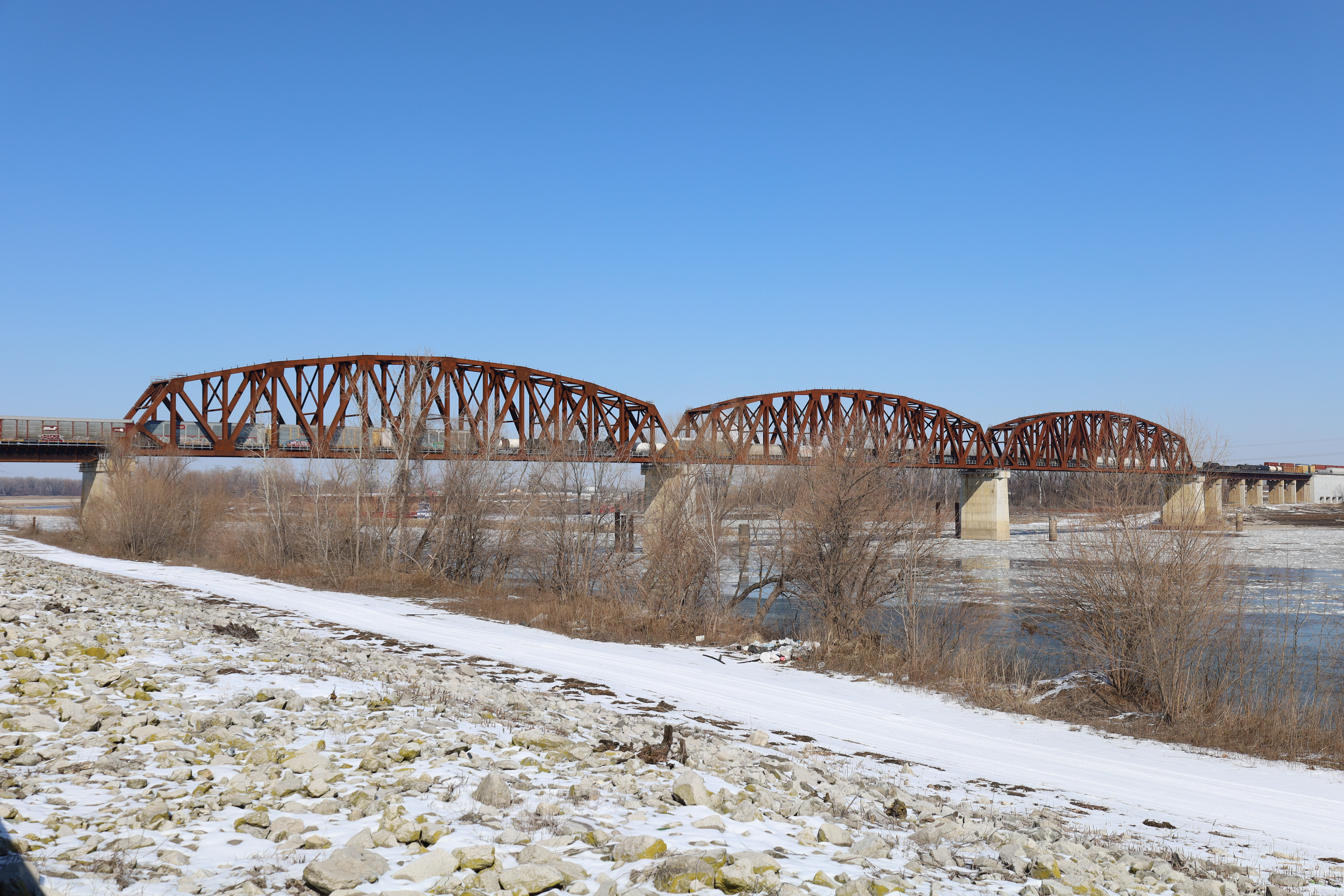
- The bridge in 2025
- Coordinates: 38°40′29″N 90°11′10″W
- Carries: Freight and passenger traffic Union Pacific, BNSF, Amtrak
- Crosses: Mississippi River
- Locale: St. Louis, Missouri, and Venice, Illinois
- Official name: Merchants Memorial Mississippi Rail Bridge
- Owner: Terminal Railroad Association of St. Louis

Characteristics
- Design: Steel truss bridge
- Total length: 2,490 feet (760 m)
- Longest span: 520 feet (160 m)
- Clearance above: 83 feet (25 m)
- Capacity: 70 trains per day

Rail characteristics
- No. of tracks: 2

History
- Opened: 1889
- Rebuilt: 2022

Statistics
- Daily traffic: 32.3 trains per day (as of 2014)

Location
- Interactive map of Merchants Bridge

The Merchants Bridge, officially the Merchants Memorial Mississippi Rail Bridge, is a rail bridge crossing the Mississippi River between St. Louis, Missouri, and Venice, Illinois. The bridge is owned by the Terminal Railroad Association of St. Louis. It opened in May 1889 and crosses the river 3 miles (5 km) north of the Eads Bridge.

== History ==
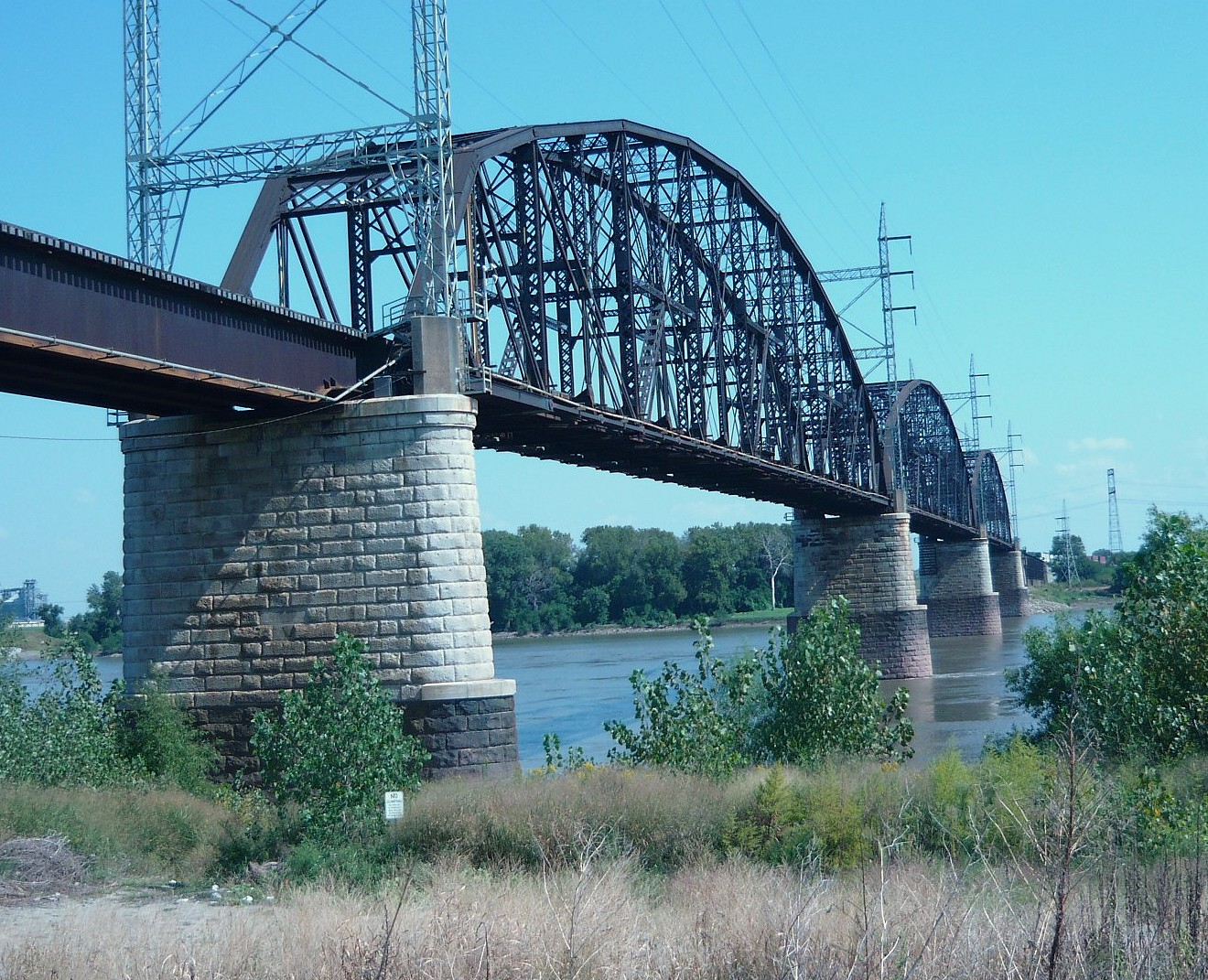
The bridge in its original configuration in 2014. The exposed masonry of the piers and the lattice girders distinguish it from the current configuration.

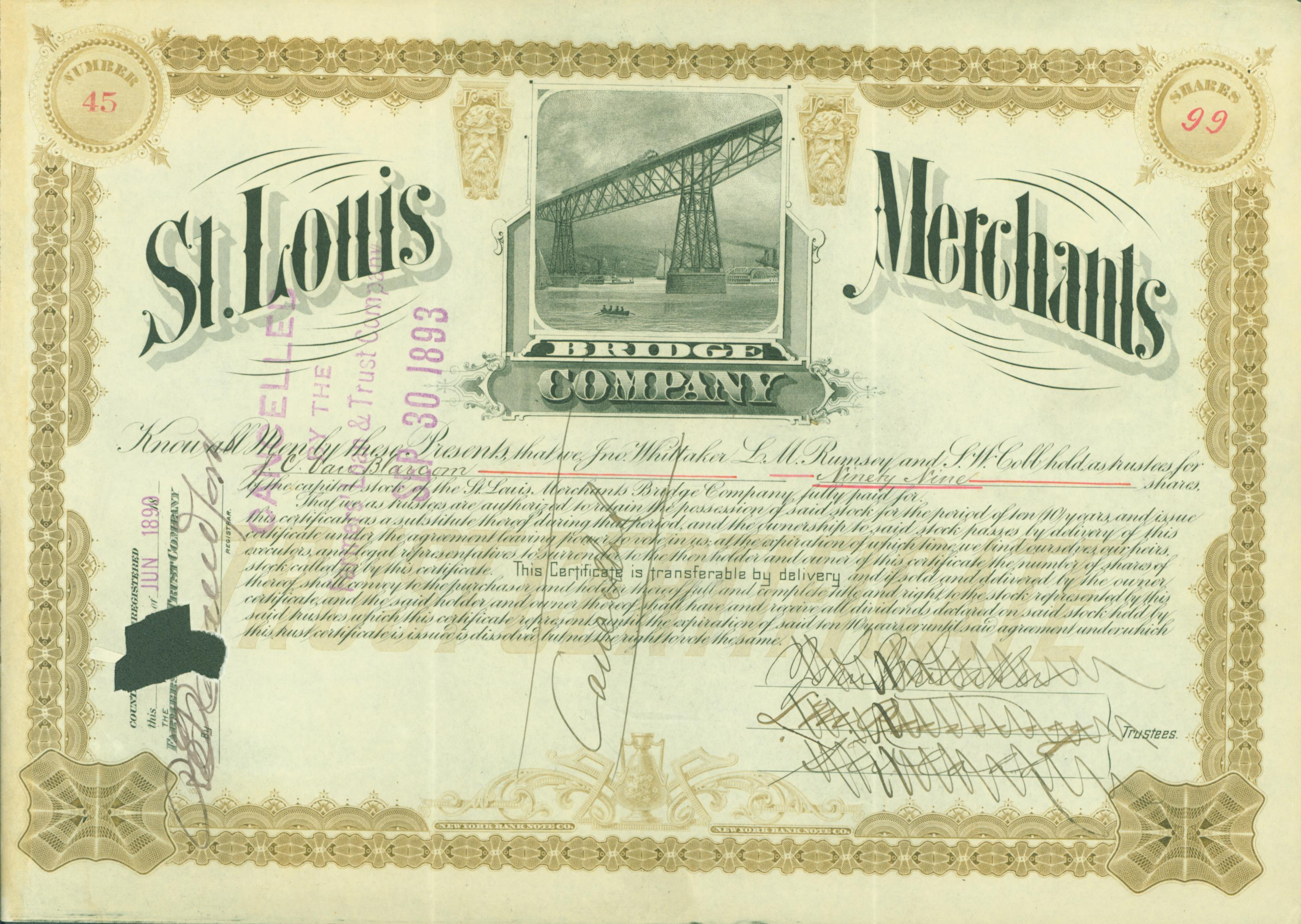
Share of the St. Louis Merchants Bridge Company, issued June 1890

The bridge was originally built by the St. Louis Merchants Exchange after it lost control of the Eads Bridge it had built to the Terminal Railroad. The Exchange feared a Terminal Railroad monopoly on the bridges but it would eventually lose control of the Merchants Bridge also.

In 2018 work began on an extensive renovation of the bridge projected to cost $172 million, which was completed in September 2022. The project involved completely replacing the three main bridge spans, and encasing the masonry piers to seismically retrofit them.

Prior to the reconstruction, the bridge's capacity was roughly 32 trains per day, with only one train traveling at 5 miles per hour able to cross the bridge at a time. Following the renovation, the capacity was 70 trains per day, with two trains able to pass each other simultaneously at up to 20 miles per hour (32 km/h). In addition, the allowable train width increased from about 13.5 ft (4.1 m) to 15 ft (4.6 m), and the railcar weight capacity increased from 286,000 lb (130,000 kg) to 315,000 lb (143,000 kg). The final cost of the project was $222 million.

== See also ==
- List of crossings of the Upper Mississippi River
