= Sampsel, Missouri =

Unincorporated community in Missouri, U.S.

Coordinates: 39°48′50″N 93°42′31″W

Sampsel (also spelled Sampsell) is a ghost town in Livingston County, in the U.S. state of Missouri.

== History ==
Sampsel was originally spelled Sampsell, and under the latter name was platted in 1870 when the railroad was extended to that point. The community has the name of J. B. F. Sampsell, a railroad man. A post office called Sampsell Station was established in 1871, the name was changed to Sampsell in 1906, and the post office closed in 1953.

At its peak in 1929, the town had a bank, a general store, a pool hall, a grain elevator, as well as two schools and a number of houses. The town was abandoned sometime between 1970 and 1990. Many of the original buildings are still standing.
