= Dawn, Missouri =

- Census-designated place
- Location within Missouri Location within the United States
- Coordinates: 39°40′6″N 93°38′7″W
- Country: United States
- State: Missouri
- County: Livingston

Area
  - Total: 1.31 sq mi (3.39 km^{2})
  - Land: 1.31 sq mi (3.39 km^{2})
  - Water: 0 sq mi (0.00 km^{2})
- Elevation: 728 ft (222 m)

Population (2020)
  - Total: 100
  - Density: 76.4/sq mi (29.51/km^{2})
- Time zone: UTC-6 (Central (CST))
  - Summer (DST): UTC-5 (CDT)
- ZIP code: 64638
- Area code: 660
- FIPS code: 29-18496
- GNIS feature ID: 716744

Dawn is an unincorporated community and census-designated place (CDP) in Livingston County, Missouri, United States. As of the 2020 census it had a population of 100.

Dawn was platted in 1853. A post office called Dawn has been in operation since 1852.

== Geography ==
Dawn is located in southwestern Livingston County on Missouri Supplemental Route C, approximately 13 miles (21 km) southwest of Chillicothe, the county seat.

According to the U.S. Census Bureau, the Dawn CDP has an area of 1.3 square miles (3.4 km^{2}), all of it recorded as land. The community is on high ground on the east bank of Shoal Creek, a northeast-flowing tributary of the Grand River and part of the Missouri River watershed.

== Demographics ==
Historical population
Census	Pop.	Note	%±
2020	100		—
U.S. Decennial Census
