= 1967 St. Louis tornado outbreak =

Weather event in the United States

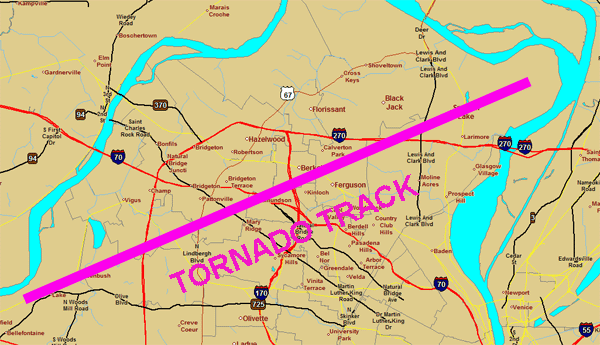
- Path of the F4 tornado in St. Louis

Tornado outbreak
- Max. rating: F4 tornado
- Duration: January 24, 1967

Overall effects
- Fatalities: 7
- Injuries: 268
- Areas affected: Primarily the Upper Midwest
- Part of the tornadoes and tornado outbreaks of 1967

A wintertime tornado outbreak affected the Midwestern United States on January 24, 1967. Of the 30 confirmed tornadoes, 13 occurred in Iowa, nine in Missouri, seven in Illinois, and one in Wisconsin. The outbreak produced, at the time, the northernmost tornado to hit the United States in winter, in Wisconsin, until January 7, 2008. The tornadoes formed ahead of a deep storm system in which several temperature records were broken. The deadliest and most damaging tornado of the outbreak struck Greater St. Louis at F4 intensity, killing three people and injuring 216. (Note: An outbreak is generally defined as a group of at least six tornadoes (the number sometimes varies slightly according to local climatology) with no more than a six-hour gap between individual tornadoes. An outbreak sequence, prior to (after) the start of modern records in 1950, is defined as a period of no more than two (one) consecutive days without at least one significant (F2 or stronger) tornado.)

== Background ==
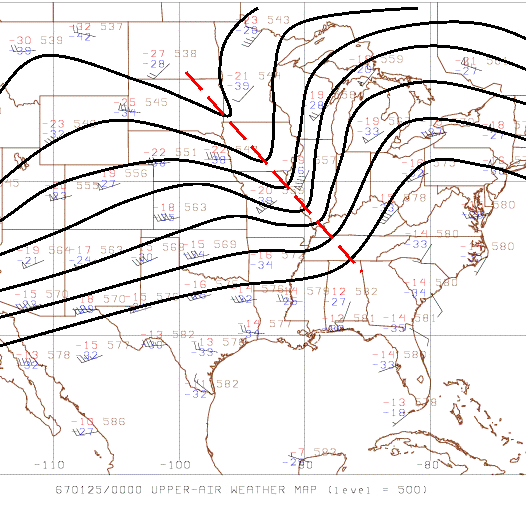
Upper-air analysis at 00:00 UTC on January 25, 1967

On Tuesday, January 24, 1967, a negatively tilted trough bisected the Midwestern United States. As a cold front traversed the Upper Midwest, a line of intermittent, tornado-producing supercells developed.

== Confirmed tornadoes ==
Confirmed tornadoes by Fujita rating
FU	F0	F1	F2	F3	F4	F5	Total
0	3	4	15	6	2	0	30*

Prior to 1990, there is a likely undercount of tornadoes, particularly E/F0–1, with reports of weaker tornadoes becoming more common as population increased. A sharp increase in the annual average E/F0–1 count by approximately 200 tornadoes was noted upon the implementation of NEXRAD Doppler weather radar in 1990–1991. (Note: Historically, the number of tornadoes globally and in the United States was and is likely underrepresented: research by Grazulis on annual tornado activity suggests that, as of 2001, only 53% of yearly U.S. tornadoes were officially recorded. Documentation of tornadoes outside the United States was historically less exhaustive, owing to the lack of monitors in many nations and, in some cases, to internal political controls on public information. Most countries only recorded tornadoes that produced severe damage or loss of life. Significant low biases in U.S. tornado counts likely occurred through the early 1990s, when advanced NEXRAD was first installed and the National Weather Service began comprehensively verifying tornado occurrences.) 1974 marked the first year where significant tornado (E/F2+) counts became homogenous with contemporary values, attributed to the consistent implementation of Fujita scale assessments. (Note: The Fujita scale was devised under the aegis of scientist T. Theodore Fujita in the early 1970s. Prior to the advent of the scale in 1971, tornadoes in the United States were officially unrated. Tornado ratings were retroactively applied to events prior to the formal adoption of the F-scale by the National Weather Service. While the Fujita scale has been superseded by the Enhanced Fujita scale in the U.S. since February 1, 2007, Canada used the old scale until April 1, 2013; nations elsewhere, like the United Kingdom, apply other classifications such as the TORRO scale.) Numerous discrepancies on the details of tornadoes in this outbreak exist between sources. The total count of tornadoes and ratings differs from various agencies accordingly. The list below documents information from the most contemporary official sources alongside assessments from tornado historian Thomas P. Grazulis.

Color/symbol key
Color / symbol	Description
†	Data from Grazulis 1990/1993/2001b
¶	Data from a local National Weather Service office
※	Data from the 1967 Storm Data publication
‡	Data from the NCEI database
♯	Maximum width of tornado
±	Tornado was rated below F2 intensity by Grazulis but a specific rating is unavailable.

- Along with the 30 confirmed tornadoes listed, tornado researcher Thomas P. Grazulis listed two additional F2 tornadoes that may have touched down.
  - The first occurred west of Muscatine, Muscatine County, Iowa, at 22:30 UTC, unroofing and tearing apart a house. It was officially listed as a severe thunderstorm wind in Storm Data.
  - The other occurred on the southern outskirts of Illinois City, Rock Island County, Illinois, at an unknown time, damaging homes before ripping the roof off a farmhouse. It was officially listed as part of a complex of severe thunderstorm winds in Storm Data.

List of confirmed tornadoes in the tornado outbreak of January 24, 1967
F#	Location	County / Parish	State	Start Coord. (Note: All starting coordinates are based on the NCEI database and may not reflect contemporary analyses)	Time (UTC) (Note: All dates are based on the local time zone where the tornado touched down; however, all times are in Coordinated Universal Time and dates are split at midnight CST/CDT for consistency.)	Path length	Width (Note: The listed width values are primarily the average/mean width of the tornadoes, with those having known maximum widths denoted by ♯. From 1952 to 1994, reports largely list mean width whereas contemporary years list maximum width. Values provided by Grazulis are the average width, with estimates being rounded down (i.e. 0.5 mi (0.80 km) is rounded down from 880 yards to 800 yards.)	Damage
F2	N of De Kalb to SSE of Lake Station	Buchanan	MO	39.60°N 94.93°W	17:50–?	6.1 mi (9.8 km)	100 yd (91 m)	
F2	This strong tornado affected 12 or more farmsteads. It destroyed a concrete barn, along with assorted outbuildings and other barns. Homes lost their roofs, along with some walls. Losses totaled $250,000.							
F2	E of Haynesville to S of Barnesville	Clinton	MO	39.45°N 94.23°W	18:35–?	2.5 mi (4.0 km)	50 yd (46 m)	
F2	This strong but relatively brief tornado developed 1 mi (1.6 km) west of the junction of Missouri Supplemental Route PP and U.S. Route 69. As it headed northeast, it struck five farmsteads, extensively damaging outbuildings on a few of them. Losses totaled $25,000. Tornado researcher Thomas P. Grazulis did not list the tornado as an F2 or stronger.							
F3	SSE of Lake City to Northwestern Buckner to NE of Albany	Jackson, Ray	MO	39.10°N 94.25°W	18:40–19:00	14.5 mi (23.3 km)	200 yd (180 m)	
F3	2 deaths – This intense tornado first developed over the Lake City Army Ammunition Plant, 3 mi (4.8 km) from Buckner. Tracking northeastward, it first produced a narrow, spasmodic swath of structural damage, skirting Buckner and passing east of Sibley. As it neared Orrick, the tornado widened and intensified, striking Orrick High School while at maximum intensity. Part of a roof at the school collapsed, killing two students underneath. Two homes were destroyed and another lost its second story. Barns and outbuildings were leveled along the path. 18 people were injured and losses totaled $5 million.							
F0	SE of Polo	Caldwell	MO	39.55°N 94.05°W	18:50–?	2 mi (3.2 km)	100 yd (91 m)	
F0	Losses totaled $25,000.							
F0	E of Sturges	Livingston	MO	39.88°N 93.48°W	20:00–?	0.1 mi (0.16 km)	10 yd (9.1 m)	
F0	Losses totaled $30.							
F1	W of Green City to N of Pennville	Sullivan	MO	40.27°N 93.02°W	20:20–?	7.3 mi (11.7 km)	50 yd (46 m)	
F1	This tornado wrecked a number of outbuildings and a barn. Losses totaled $25,000. Grazulis listed the tornado as an F2.							
F1	Glendale to NW of Livonia	Putnam	MO	40.48°N 92.77°W	20:45–?	2.5 mi (4.0 km)	50 yd (46 m)	
F1	Moving generally northeastward, this tornado developed near the junction of Missouri Route 149 and U.S. Route 136. Losses totaled $2,500.							
F4	ESE of Queen City, MO to ESE of Pulaski, IA	Schuyler (MO), Scotland (MO), Davis (IA)	MO, IA	40.40°N 92.53°W	20:45–?	25.7 mi (41.4 km)	440 yd (400 m)	
F4	This violent tornado damaged or destroyed numerous outbuildings and barns on 24 farmsteads. Five of the farmsteads were destroyed, two of which had every structure leveled, including the farmhouse. A total of approximately 20 other farms were damaged as well. Two people were injured and losses totaled $2,525,000. Most of the path and the F4-level damage were in Missouri. Only a 2-mile-long (3.2 km) segment continued into Iowa, with F1-level damage.							
F3	S of Douds to E of Fairfield	Van Buren, Jefferson	IA	40.87°N 92.08°W	21:15–?	25 mi (40 km)	400 yd (370 m)	
F3	This intense tornado produced sporadic damage. It badly damaged several homes, some of which lost roofs and walls. Barns and outbuildings were destroyed as well. Losses totaled $250,000. Grazulis listed the tornado as an F2. The NCEI only lists a single coordinate, north of Douds.							
F1	Western Washington	Washington	IA	41.30°N 91.70°W	21:45–?	1 mi (1.6 km)	200 yd (180 m)	
F1	Losses totaled $2,500.							
F0	N of Winfield	Henry	IA	41.15°N 91.43°W	21:50–?	0.1 mi (0.16 km)	150 yd (140 m)	
F0	Losses totaled $250,000.							
F2	SW of Columbus City	Louisa	IA	41.30°N 91.37°W	22:00–?	3 mi (4.8 km)	250 yd (230 m)	
F2	Losses totaled $30. Grazulis did not list the tornado as an F2 or stronger. The NCEI lists the path as occurring north of Fredonia and extending into Muscatine County.							
F3	N of Fort Madison to S of Wever (1st tornado)	Lee	IA	40.67°N 91.32°W	22:15–?	4.3 mi (6.9 km)	300 yd (270 m)	
F3	1 death – This intense tornado destroyed a pair of homes, one of which only had a single wall left standing. Six people were injured and losses totaled $250,000.							
F2	S of Wever (2nd tornado) to N of Skunk River	Lee	IA	40.70°N 91.23°W	22:20–?	3 mi (4.8 km)	200 yd (180 m)	
F2	This strong tornado crossed the Skunk River near Wever. Homes had their roofs torn off and barns were wrecked. Trailers were destroyed as well, injuring four people. Losses totaled $250,000.							
F2	ENE of Cairo	Louisa	IA	41.20°N 91.28°W	22:20–?	2 mi (3.2 km)	150 yd (140 m)	
F2	This strong tornado tore loose a wall from a house and tossed an automobile against the home. A nearby barn was destroyed as well. One person was injured and losses totaled $25,000.							
F2	ESE of Gladstone to W of Reeds	Henderson	IL	40.85°N 90.93°W	22:40–22:50	5.7 mi (9.2 km)	77 yd (70 m)	
F2	This tornado, while mostly affecting treetops, unroofed or otherwise damaged many outbuildings and barns. At least one barn was flattened, six utility poles splintered, and a farm shorn of all its outbuildings. Losses totaled $25,000. The tornado passed north of Biggsville.							
F2	S of Wheatland	Clinton	IA	41.80°N 90.83°W	22:45–?	2 mi (3.2 km)	150 yd (140 m)	
F2	Losses totaled $25,000. Grazulis did not list the tornado as an F2 or stronger.							
F2	NNE of Dixon	Clinton	IA	41.78°N 90.77°W	22:50–?	2 mi (3.2 km)	143 yd (131 m)	
F2	Losses totaled $25,000. Grazulis did not list the tornado as an F2 or stronger. Storm Data indicates that the tornado occurred near Calamus.							
F2	Southern Eldridge	Scott	IA	41.62°N 90.58°W	23:11–?	2 mi (3.2 km)	250 yd (230 m)	
F2	This strong tornado touched down just west of Mount Joy. It hurled an automobile and a truck from a roadway. Homes sustained breakage of their windows and barns were wrecked. Losses totaled $250,000.							
F2	NW of Elvira	Clinton	IA	41.87°N 90.37°W	23:15–?	1 mi (1.6 km)	200 yd (180 m)	
F2	Losses totaled $25,000. Grazulis did not list the tornado as an F2 or stronger.							
F2	NE of Tenmile	Clinton	IA	41.95°N 90.33°W	23:15–?	0.1 mi (0.16 km)	100 yd (91 m)	
F2	Several barns, a warehouse, and a Granger Hall were destroyed. Homes nearby had their roofs torn off. Losses totaled $250,000. The tornado may have developed near Bryant. Storm Data listed a 5-mile-long (8.0 km) path.							
F3	E of Burke to NE of Mount Carroll	Carroll	IL	42.05°N 90.03°W	23:30–?	7.4 mi (11.9 km)	77 yd (70 m)	
F3	This intense tornado destroyed three homes on the northwestern side of Mount Carroll, one of which it impacted at borderline-F4 intensity. Roofing, outbuildings, and barns incurred extensive damage as well. 12 people were injured and losses totaled $250,000. Grazulis listed the time of occurrence as 22:40 UTC.							
F1	WSW of Saidora to NNE of White City	Mason	IL	40.10°N 90.17°W	23:30–?	4.5 mi (7.2 km)	30 yd (27 m)	
F1	This tornado paralleled the following event, just 3 mi (4.8 km) away. Outbuildings, a hangar, and trees were destroyed or extensively damaged. An airplane was damaged as well. One person was injured. Losses were unknown. Storm Data attributed the sole injury to the next event.							
F3	S of Snicarte to SE of Bluff City	Mason	IL	40.12°N 90.22°W	23:30–?	5.1 mi (8.2 km)	80 yd (73 m)	
F3	1 death – This intense tornado destroyed rural homes and outbuildings. Three people were injured and losses totaled $25,000. The body of the dead was tossed 200 yd (600 ft). Storm Data stated that the path was only 1 mi (1.6 km) long.							
F3	S of Brodhead to SE of Milton	Green, Rock	WI	42.60°N 89.37°W	00:10–00:40	24.9 mi (40.1 km)	200 yd (180 m)	
F3	This intense but intermittent tornado wrecked a number of barns. A country club was stripped of its roof and a pair of walls as well. Losses totaled $250,000. Grazulis listed the tornado as an F2. At the time the tornado was the northernmost wintertime tornado on record in the contiguous United States.							
F2	ENE of Cooper to WSW of Cruger	Tazewell, Woodford	IL	40.67°N 89.38°W	00:30–?	3.3 mi (5.3 km)	77 yd (70 m)	
F2	This strong tornado snapped and felled trees. Roofing and outbuildings were damaged as well. Losses totaled $2,500. Grazulis did not list the tornado as an F2 or stronger.							
F2	S of Virden	Macoupin	IL	39.48°N 89.77°W	00:50–?	2.5 mi (4.0 km)	100 yd (91 m)	
F2	This tornado flipped a home upside down and shifted another. In all about 100 homes were damaged to varying degrees. Most of the damage was to roofing or from fallen trees. Several trailers were damaged as well, and a few grain bins were moved 200–440 yd (600–1,320 ft). Losses totaled $250,000. Grazulis did not list the tornado as an F2 or stronger.							
F2	NW of Metamora	Woodford	IL		00:50–	2.5 mi (4.0 km)		
F4	NE of Chesterfield to NE of Spanish Lake	St. Louis	MO		00:55–	25 mi (40 km)		
F4	3 deaths – See section on this tornado							
F2	Champaign–Urbana	Champaign	IL		02:40–	10.4 mi (16.7 km)		
F2	A trailer was destroyed and scattered, two others were overturned, and two more were damaged. One house had its roof torn off.							

=== Northern Chesterfield–Maryland Heights–St. Ann–Lambert Field–Spanish Lake, Missouri ===
Northern Chesterfield–Maryland Heights–St. Ann–Lambert Field–Spanish Lake, Missouri
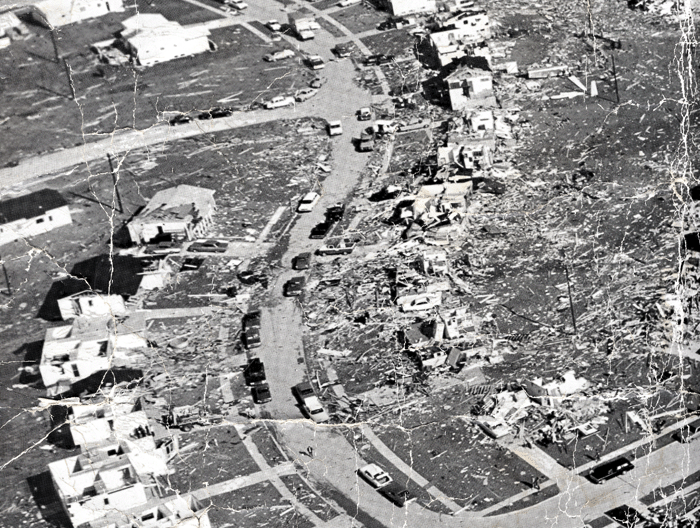
- Aerial view of damage in Chesterfield, Missouri, after the F4 tornado of January 24, 1967

Meteorological history
- Date: January 24, 1967
- Formed: January 24, 1967, 6:55 p.m. CST (UTC−06:00)
- Dissipated: January 24, 1967, 7:30 p.m. CST (UTC−06:00)
- Duration: 35 minutes

F4 tornado
- on the Fujita scale

Overall effects
- Fatalities: 3
- Injuries: 216
- Damage: $25,000,000 (1967 USD) $241 million (2025 USD)

This tornado initially touched down around 6:55 p.m. in western St. Louis County at Olive Street Road near the Howard Bend Pumping Station where damage was reported to the Chesterfield Manor Nursing Home. The tornado moved northeast at 40 mph striking the small community of Lake, the luxury homes at River Bend Estates and Old Farm Estates valued between $25,000 and $33,000 (1967 dollars), Creve Coeur Meadows and Glenwood Subdivisions, and the heavily populated communities of Maryland Heights, Bridgeton, St. Ann, Edmundson, Woodson Terrace, Berkeley, Ferguson, Dellwood, the Hathaway Manor Subdivision, and Spanish Lake. The tornado apparently dissipated or weakened as it crossed the Mississippi River, as there is no record of significant damage in Illinois.

The damage path ranged from 50 to 200 yards wide and the tornado was on the ground for approximately 35 minutes. Remarkably only 3 fatalities were reported while 216 people suffered injuries. Damage included 168 homes destroyed, 258 with major damage, and 1485 with minor damage. At least 600 businesses were damaged or destroyed. The total damage was estimated to be around 15 million dollars (approximately 125 million dollars in 2022).

The tornado was given a F4 rating on the Fujita Tornado Ranking Scale. The F4 occurrence was likely small in aerial coverage with the majority of the severe damage being classified as either F2 or F3.

== See also ==
- List of tornadoes and tornado outbreaks
  - List of North American tornadoes and tornado outbreaks
- List of schools struck by tornadoes
- Tornado outbreak of January 2008 – Similar rare tornado outbreak in January in the Midwest

== Sources ==
- Agee, Ernest M.; Childs, Samuel (June 1, 2014). "Adjustments in Tornado Counts, F-Scale Intensity, and Path Width for Assessing Significant Tornado Destruction". Journal of Applied Meteorology and Climatology. 53 (6). American Meteorological Society: 1494–1505. Bibcode:2014JApMC..53.1494A. doi:10.1175/JAMC-D-13-0235.1.
- Brooks, Harold E. (April 2004). "On the Relationship of Tornado Path Length and Width to Intensity". Weather and Forecasting. 19 (2): 310–19. Bibcode:2004WtFor..19..310B. doi:10.1175/1520-0434(2004)019<0310:OTROTP>2.0.CO;2.
- Cook, A. R.; Schaefer, J. T. (August 2008). "The Relation of El Niño–Southern Oscillation (ENSO) to Winter Tornado Outbreaks". Monthly Weather Review. 136 (8): 3121–3137. Bibcode:2008MWRv..136.3121C. doi:10.1175/2007MWR2171.1.
- Edwards, Roger; LaDue, James G.; Ferree, John T.; Scharfenberg, Kevin; Maier, Chris; Coulbourne, William L. (May 1, 2013). "Tornado Intensity Estimation: Past, Present, and Future". Bulletin of the American Meteorological Society. 94 (5). American Meteorological Society: 641–653. Bibcode:2013BAMS...94..641E. doi:10.1175/BAMS-D-11-00006.1.
- Grazulis, Thomas P. (May 1984). Violent Tornado Climatography, 1880–1982. OSTI (Technical report). NUREG. Washington, D.C.: Nuclear Regulatory Commission. OSTI 7099491. CR-3670.
  - — (November 1990). Significant Tornadoes 1880–1989. Vol. 2. St. Johnsbury, Vermont: The Tornado Project of Environmental Films. ISBN 1-879362-02-3.
  - — (July 1993). Significant Tornadoes 1680–1991: A Chronology and Analysis of Events. St. Johnsbury, Vermont: The Tornado Project of Environmental Films. ISBN 1-879362-03-1.
  - — (2001a). The Tornado: Nature's Ultimate Windstorm. Norman: University of Oklahoma Press. ISBN 978-0-8061-3538-0.
  - — (2001b). F5-F6 Tornadoes. St. Johnsbury, Vermont: The Tornado Project of Environmental Films.
- National Weather Service (January 1967). Storm Data Publication (Report). National Centers for Environmental Information – via Storm Events Database.
- U.S. Weather Bureau (January 1967). "Storm Data and Unusual Weather Phenomena". Storm Data. 9 (1). Asheville, North Carolina: National Climatic Data Center. Archived from the original on May 3, 2011.
