= Missouri's 6th congressional district =

U.S. House district for Missouri

Coordinates: 39°56′53″N 93°17′37″W

- Interactive map of district boundaries since January 3, 2023
- Representative: Sam Graves; R–Tarkio
- Population (2025): 787,058
- Median household income: $74,998
- Ethnicity: 86.2% White; 4.6% Two or more races; 3.8% Hispanic; 3.5% Black; 1.0% Asian; 0.8% other
- Cook PVI: R+19

Missouri's 6th congressional district takes in a large swath of land in northern Missouri, stretching across nearly the entire width of the state from Kansas to Illinois. Its largest voting population is centered in the northern portion of the Kansas City metropolitan area and the City of St. Joseph. The district includes much of Kansas City north of the Missouri River (including Kansas City International Airport).

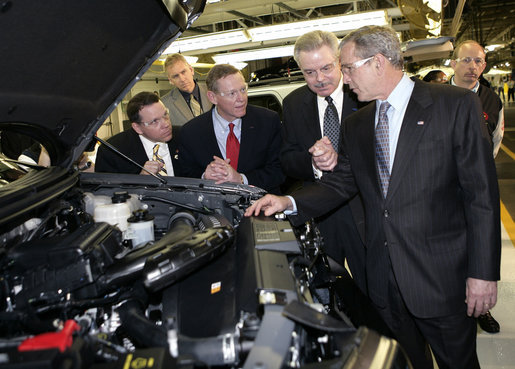
Rep. Graves (left) with George W. Bush at the Ford Kansas City Assembly Plant in Claycomo, Missouri. March, 2007.

The district takes in all or parts of the following counties: Adair, Andrew, Atchison, Audrain, Buchanan, Caldwell, Carroll, Chariton, Clark, Clay, Clinton, Daviess, De Kalb, Gentry, Grundy, Harrison, Holt, Jackson, Knox, Lewis, Lincoln, Linn, Livingston, Macon, Marion, Mercer, Monroe, Nodaway, Pike, Platte, Putnam, Ralls, Randolph, Schuyler, Scotland, Shelby, Sullivan, Worth.

Notable representatives from the district include governors John Smith Phelps and Austin A. King as well as Kansas City Mayor Robert T. Van Horn. In 1976, Jerry Litton was killed on election night as he flew to a victory party after winning the Democratic nomination for United States Senate. The visitors center at Smithville Lake is named in Litton's memory. Democrat Pat Danner, a former aide to Jerry Litton, won the seat in 1992 becoming the first woman to be elected in the district, defeating 16-year Republican incumbent Tom Coleman.

George W. Bush beat John Kerry in this district 57%–42% in 2004. The district is represented by Republican Sam Graves, who has held the seat since 2001. Graves easily held on to his seat what was expected to be a tough 2008 election, defeating former Kansas City mayor Kay Waldo Barnes by 23 percentage points.

Graves announced on March 27, 2026 that he will not be seeking re-election.

Historically, the 6th was not safe for either party. However, in recent years, it has trended Republican, mirroring the increasingly conservative bent of the more rural areas of Missouri that historically voted for Yellow Dog Democrats. President Donald J. Trump won the 6th District, under the 2026 boundaries, by a 63%-36% margin, trouncing Kamala Harris.

== History ==
=== Redistricting following 2010 census ===
After Missouri lost a congressional seat following the 2010 census (in part because of losses in population in several rural northern Missouri counties), the 6th was expanded to include most of Missouri north of the Missouri River, stretching from border to border from Kansas to Illinois. The biggest geographic addition was in northeast Missouri (including Kirksville, Missouri and Hannibal, Missouri), which used to be the northern half of the old 9th district.

The 6th lost Cooper and Howard counties to the 4th district, and Gladstone in southwestern Clay County to the 5th district. Meanwhile, the 6th was pushed further into Jackson County, taking in the northeastern portion between the Missouri River and Interstate 70, as well as a small sliver southwest of Independence.

In the 2020 redistricting, more of Clay County was ceded the 5th District, including North Kansas City, but gaining Ray County from the 5th. The district also moved into the St. Louis metropolitan area for the first time, gaining Lincoln County, including its largest city, Troy, from the 3rd district.

== Composition ==
For the 118th and successive Congresses (based on redistricting following the 2020 census), the district contains all or portions of the following counties, townships, and municipalities:

Adair County (6)

All 6 communities

Andrew County (9)

All 9 communities

Atchison County (5)

All 5 communities

Audrain County (9)

All 9 communities

Buchanan County (8)

All 8 communities

Caldwell County (7)

All 7 communities

Caroll County (7)

All 7 communities

Charlton County (9)

All 9 communities

Clark County (8)

All 8 communities

Clay County (13)

Birmingham, Excelsior Springs (shared with Ray County), Glenaire, Homestead, Holt, Kansas City (part; also 4th and 5th; shared with Cass, Jackson, and Platte counties), Kearney, Liberty, Missouri City, Mosby, Paradise, Prathersville, Smithville

Clinton County (11)

All 11 communities

Daviess County (10)

All 10 communities

DeKalb County (8)

All 8 communities

Gentry County (6)

All 6 communities

Grundy County (8)

All 8 communities

Harrison County (8)

All 8 communities

Holt County (9)

All 9 communities

Jackson County (7)

Buckner, Independence (part; also 4th and 5th), Kansas City (part; also 4th and 5th; shared with Cass, Clay, and Platte counties), Levasy, River Bend, Sibley, Sugar Creek (part; also 5th)

Knox County (7)

All 7 communities

Lewis County (6)

All 6 communities

Lincoln County (13)

All 13 communities

Linn County (8)

All 8 communities

Livingston County (7)

All 7 communities

Macon County (10)

All 10 communities

Marion County (3)

All 3 communities

Mercer County (4)

All 4 communities

Monroe County (6)

All 6 communities

Nodaway County (18)

All 18 communities

Pike County (12)

All 12 communities

Platte County (19)

All 19 communities

Putnam County (6)

All 6 communities

Ralls County (6)

All 6 communities

Randolph County (8)

All 8 communities

Ray County (14)

All 14 communities

Schuyler County (5)

All 5 communities

Scotland County (5)

All 5 communities

Shelby County (6)

All 6 communities

Sullivan County (10)

All 10 communities

Worth County (6)

All 6 communities

== List of members representing the district ==
Member	Party	Years	Cong ress	Electoral history	District location
District created March 4, 1853
John S. Phelps (Springfield)	Democratic	March 4, 1853 – March 3, 1863	33rd 34th 35th 36th 37th	Redistricted from the 5th district and re-elected in 1852. Re-elected in 1854. Re-elected in 1856. Re-elected in 1858. Re-elected in 1860. Retired.	
Austin A. King (Richmond)	Union	March 4, 1863 – March 3, 1865	38th	Elected in 1862. Lost re-election.	
Robert T. Van Horn (Kansas City)	Republican	March 4, 1865 – March 3, 1871	39th 40th 41st	Elected in 1864. Re-elected in 1866. Re-elected in 1868. Retired.	
Abram Comingo (Independence)	Democratic	March 4, 1871 – March 3, 1873	42nd	Elected in 1870. Redistricted to the 8th district.	
Harrison E. Havens (Springfield)	Republican	March 4, 1873 – March 3, 1875	43rd	Redistricted from the 4th district and re-elected in 1872. Lost re-election.	
Charles H. Morgan (Lamar)	Democratic	March 4, 1875 – March 3, 1879	44th 45th	Elected in 1874. Re-elected in 1876. Lost re-election.	
James R. Waddill (Springfield)	Democratic	March 4, 1879 – March 3, 1881	46th	Elected in 1878. Retired.	
Ira S. Haseltine (Springfield)	Greenback	March 4, 1881 – March 3, 1883	47th	Elected in 1880. Lost re-election.	
John Cosgrove (Boonville)	Democratic	March 4, 1883 – March 3, 1885	48th	Elected in 1882. Renominated in 1884 but withdrew before election.	
John T. Heard (Sedalia)	Democratic	March 4, 1885 – March 3, 1893	49th 50th 51st 52nd	Elected in 1884. Re-elected in 1886. Re-elected in 1888. Re-elected in 1890. Redistricted to the 7th district.	
David A. De Armond (Butler)	Democratic	March 4, 1893 – November 23, 1909	53rd 54th 55th 56th 57th 58th 59th 60th 61st	Redistricted from the 12th district and re-elected in 1892. Re-elected in 1894. Re-elected in 1896. Re-elected in 1898. Re-elected in 1900. Re-elected in 1902. Re-elected in 1904. Re-elected in 1906. Re-elected in 1908. Died.	
Vacant		November 23, 1909 – February 1, 1910	61st		
Clement C. Dickinson (Clinton)	Democratic	February 1, 1910 – March 3, 1921	61st 62nd 63rd 64th 65th 66th	Elected to finish De Armond's term. Re-elected in 1910. Re-elected in 1912. Re-elected in 1914. Re-elected in 1916. Re-elected in 1918. Lost re-election.	
William O. Atkeson (Butler)	Republican	March 4, 1921 – March 3, 1923	67th	Elected in 1920. Lost re-election.	
Clement C. Dickinson (Clinton)	Democratic	March 4, 1923 – March 3, 1929	68th 69th 70th	Elected in 1922. Re-elected in 1924. Re-elected in 1926. Lost re-election.	
Thomas J. Halsey (Holden)	Republican	March 4, 1929 – March 3, 1931	71st	Elected in 1928; Lost re-election.	
Clement C. Dickinson (Clinton)	Democratic	March 4, 1931 – March 3, 1933	72nd	Elected in 1930. Redistricted to the At-large district.	
District inactive		March 4, 1933 – January 3, 1935	73rd	All representatives elected At-large on a general ticket	
Reuben T. Wood (Springfield)	Democratic	January 3, 1935 – January 3, 1941	74th 75th 76th	Redistricted from the At-large district and re-elected in 1934. Re-elected in 1936. Re-elected in 1938. Lost re-election.	
Philip A. Bennett (Springfield)	Republican	January 3, 1941 – December 7, 1942	77th	Elected in 1940. Re-elected in 1942 but died before term began.	
Vacant		December 7, 1942 – January 12, 1943	77th 78th		
Marion T. Bennett (Springfield)	Republican	January 12, 1943 – January 3, 1949	78th 79th 80th	Elected to finish his father's term. Re-elected in 1944. Re-elected in 1946. Lost re-election.	
George H. Christopher (Amoret)	Democratic	January 3, 1949 – January 3, 1951	81st	Elected in 1948. Lost re-election.	
Orland K. Armstrong (Springfield)	Republican	January 3, 1951 – January 3, 1953	82nd	Elected in 1950. Retired.	
William Clay Cole (St. Joseph)	Republican	January 3, 1953 – January 3, 1955	83rd	Elected in 1952. Lost re-election.	1953–1963 [data missing]
William R. Hull Jr. (Weston)	Democratic	January 3, 1955 – January 3, 1973	84th 85th 86th 87th 88th 89th 90th 91st 92nd	Elected in 1954. Re-elected in 1956. Re-elected in 1958. Re-elected in 1960. Re-elected in 1962. Re-elected in 1964. Re-elected in 1966. Re-elected in 1968. Re-elected in 1970. Retired.	1953–1963 [data missing]
William R. Hull Jr. (Weston)	Democratic	January 3, 1955 – January 3, 1973	84th 85th 86th 87th 88th 89th 90th 91st 92nd	Elected in 1954. Re-elected in 1956. Re-elected in 1958. Re-elected in 1960. Re-elected in 1962. Re-elected in 1964. Re-elected in 1966. Re-elected in 1968. Re-elected in 1970. Retired.	1963–1973 [data missing]
Jerry Litton (Chillicothe)	Democratic	January 3, 1973 – August 3, 1976	93rd 94th	Elected in 1972. Re-elected in 1974. Died before getting renominated.	1973–1983 [data missing]
Vacant		August 3, 1976 – November 2, 1976	94th		1973–1983 [data missing]
Tom Coleman (Gladstone)	Republican	November 2, 1976 – January 3, 1993	94th 95th 96th 97th 98th 99th 100th 101st 102nd	Elected to finish Litton's term. Elected to full term in 1976. Re-elected in 1978. Re-elected in 1980. Re-elected in 1982. Re-elected in 1984. Re-elected in 1986. Re-elected in 1988. Re-elected in 1990. Lost re-election.	1973–1983 [data missing]
Tom Coleman (Gladstone)	Republican	November 2, 1976 – January 3, 1993	94th 95th 96th 97th 98th 99th 100th 101st 102nd	Elected to finish Litton's term. Elected to full term in 1976. Re-elected in 1978. Re-elected in 1980. Re-elected in 1982. Re-elected in 1984. Re-elected in 1986. Re-elected in 1988. Re-elected in 1990. Lost re-election.	1983–1993 [data missing]
Pat Danner (Kansas City)	Democratic	January 3, 1993 – January 3, 2001	103rd 104th 105th 106th	Elected in 1992. Re-elected in 1994. Re-elected in 1996. Re-elected in 1998. Retired.	1993–2003 [data missing]
Sam Graves (Tarkio)	Republican	January 3, 2001 – present	107th 108th 109th 110th 111th 112th 113th 114th 115th 116th 117th 118th 119th	Elected in 2000. Re-elected in 2002. Re-elected in 2004. Re-elected in 2006. Re-elected in 2008. Re-elected in 2010. Re-elected in 2012. Re-elected in 2014. Re-elected in 2016. Re-elected in 2018. Re-elected in 2020. Re-elected in 2022. Re-elected in 2024. Retiring at the end of term.	1993–2003 [data missing]
Sam Graves (Tarkio)	Republican	January 3, 2001 – present	107th 108th 109th 110th 111th 112th 113th 114th 115th 116th 117th 118th 119th	Elected in 2000. Re-elected in 2002. Re-elected in 2004. Re-elected in 2006. Re-elected in 2008. Re-elected in 2010. Re-elected in 2012. Re-elected in 2014. Re-elected in 2016. Re-elected in 2018. Re-elected in 2020. Re-elected in 2022. Re-elected in 2024. Retiring at the end of term.	2003–2013
Sam Graves (Tarkio)	Republican	January 3, 2001 – present	107th 108th 109th 110th 111th 112th 113th 114th 115th 116th 117th 118th 119th	Elected in 2000. Re-elected in 2002. Re-elected in 2004. Re-elected in 2006. Re-elected in 2008. Re-elected in 2010. Re-elected in 2012. Re-elected in 2014. Re-elected in 2016. Re-elected in 2018. Re-elected in 2020. Re-elected in 2022. Re-elected in 2024. Retiring at the end of term.	2013–2023
Sam Graves (Tarkio)	Republican	January 3, 2001 – present	107th 108th 109th 110th 111th 112th 113th 114th 115th 116th 117th 118th 119th	Elected in 2000. Re-elected in 2002. Re-elected in 2004. Re-elected in 2006. Re-elected in 2008. Re-elected in 2010. Re-elected in 2012. Re-elected in 2014. Re-elected in 2016. Re-elected in 2018. Re-elected in 2020. Re-elected in 2022. Re-elected in 2024. Retiring at the end of term.	2023–present
Chris Stigall (Holt)	Republican	Assuming office on January 3, 2027		Elected in 2026.	2023–present

== Recent election results from statewide races ==
Year	Office	Results
2008	President	McCain 55% - 42%
2012	President	Romney 62% - 38%
2012	Senate	McCaskill 50% - 43%
2012	Governor	Nixon 50% - 47%
2016	President	Trump 67% - 28%
2016	Senate	Blunt 56% - 40%
2016	Governor	Greitens 58% - 39%
2016	Lt. Governor	Parson 59% - 36%
2016	Secretary of State	Ashcroft 66% - 30%
2016	Attorney General	Hawley 66% - 34%
2018	Senate	Hawley 60% - 36%
2018	Auditor	McDowell 52% - 41%
2020	President	Trump 68% - 31%
2020	Governor	Parson 67% - 30%
2020	Lt. Governor	Kehoe 68% - 29%
2020	Secretary of State	Ashcroft 72% - 25%
2020	Treasurer	Fitzpatrick 69% - 28%
2020	Attorney General	Schmitt 69% - 28%
2022	Senate	Schmitt 65% - 32%
2024	President	Trump 69% - 30%
2024	Senate	Hawley 65% - 32%
2024	Governor	Kehoe 69% - 29%
2024	Lt. Governor	Wasinger 67% - 29%
2024	Secretary of State	Hoskins 68% - 30%
2024	Treasurer	Malek 67% - 29%
2024	Attorney General	Bailey 70% - 28%

== Election results ==
=== 1996 ===
1996 United States House of Representatives elections in Missouri
Party	Candidate	Votes	%	±%
Democratic	Pat Danner	169,006	68.6%	
Republican	Jeff Bailey	72,064	29.3%	
Libertarian	Karl H. Wetzel	5,212	2.1%	
Total votes		246,282	100%	
Majority				
Turnout				
Democratic hold		Swing		

=== 1998 ===
1998 United States House of Representatives elections in Missouri
Party	Candidate	Votes	%	±%
Democratic	Pat Danner (Incumbent)	136,774	70.9%	
Republican	Jeff Bailey	51,679	26.8%	
Libertarian	Karl H. Wetzel	4,324	2.2%	
Total votes		129,777	100%	
Majority				
Turnout				
Democratic hold		Swing		

=== 2000 ===
2000 United States House of Representatives elections in Missouri
Party	Candidate	Votes	%	±%
Republican	Samuel B. Graves Jr.	138,925	50.9%	
Democratic	Steve Danner	127,792	46.8%	
Libertarian	Jimmy Dykes	3,696	1.4%	
Independent	Marie Richey	2,788	1.0%	
Total votes		273,201	100%	
Majority				
Turnout				
Republican gain from Democratic		Swing		

=== 2002 ===
2002 United States House of Representatives elections in Missouri
Party	Candidate	Votes	%	±%
Republican	Samuel B. Graves Jr. (Incumbent)	131,151	63.0%	
Democratic	Cathy Rinehart	73,202	35.2%	
Libertarian	Erik Buck	3,735	1.8%	
Total votes		208,088	100%	
Majority				
Turnout				
Republican hold		Swing		

=== 2004 ===
2004 United States House of Representatives elections in Missouri
Party	Candidate	Votes	%	±%
Republican	Samuel B. Graves Jr. (Incumbent)	196,516	63.83%	
Democratic	Charles S. Broomfield	106,987	34.75%	
Libertarian	Erik Buck	4,352	1.41%	
Total votes		307,885	100%	
Majority				
Turnout				
Republican hold		Swing		

=== 2006 ===
2006 United States House of Representatives elections in Missouri
Party	Candidate	Votes	%	±%
Republican	Samuel B. Graves Jr. (Incumbent)	150,882	61.64%	
Democratic	Sara Jo Shettles	87,477	35.73%	
Libertarian	Erik Buck	4,757	1.94%	
Progressive	Shirley A. Yurkonis	1,679	0.69%	
Total votes		244,795	100%	
Majority				
Turnout				
Republican hold		Swing		

=== 2008 ===
2008 United States House of Representatives elections in Missouri
Party	Candidate	Votes	%	±%
Republican	Samuel B. Graves Jr. (Incumbent)	196,526	59.4%	
Democratic	Kay Barnes	121,894	36.9%	
Libertarian	Dave Browning	12,279	3.7%	
Total votes		330,699	100%	
Majority		62,353	18.8%	
Turnout				
Republican hold		Swing		

=== 2010 ===
2010 Missouri's 6th district general election
Party	Candidate	Votes	%
Republican	Sam Graves (incumbent)	154,103	69.44
Democratic	Clint Hylton	67,762	30.54
Write-In	Kyle Yarber	47	0.02
Total votes		221,912	100.00

=== 2012 ===
2012 Missouri's 6th congressional district election
Party	Candidate	Votes	%
Republican	Sam Graves (incumbent)	216,906	65.0
Democratic	Kyle Yarber	108,503	32.5
Libertarian	Russ Lee Monchil	8,279	2.5
Total votes		333,688	100.0
Republican hold			

=== 2014 ===
2014 Missouri's 6th congressional district election
Party	Candidate	Votes	%
Republican	Sam Graves (incumbent)	124,616	66.6
Democratic	W. A. (Bill) Hedge	55,157	29.5
Libertarian	Russ Monchil	7,197	3.9
Total votes		186,970	100.0
Republican hold			

=== 2016 ===
2016 Missouri's 6th congressional district election
Party	Candidate	Votes	%
Republican	Sam Graves (incumbent)	238,388	68.0
Democratic	David Blackwell	99,692	28.5
Libertarian	Russ Lee Monchil	8,123	2.3
Green	Mike Diel	4,241	1.2
Total votes		350,444	100.0
Republican hold			

=== 2018 ===
2018 Missouri's 6th congressional district election
Party	Candidate	Votes	%
Republican	Sam Graves (incumbent)	199,796	65.4
Democratic	Henry Martin	97,660	32.0
Libertarian	Dan Hogan	7,953	2.6
Total votes		305,409	100.0
Republican hold			

=== 2020 ===
2020 Missouri's 6th congressional district election
Party	Candidate	Votes	%
Republican	Sam Graves (incumbent)	258,709	67.1
Democratic	Gena Ross	118,926	30.8
Libertarian	Jim Higgins	8,144	2.1
Total votes		385,779	100.0
Republican hold			

=== 2022 ===
2022 Missouri's 6th congressional district election
Party	Candidate	Votes	%
Republican	Sam Graves (incumbent)	184,865	70.3
Democratic	Henry Martin	72,253	27.5
Libertarian	Edward A (Andy) Maidment	5,774	2.2
Total votes		262,892	100.0
Republican hold			

=== 2024 ===
2024 Missouri's 6th congressional district election
Party	Candidate	Votes	%
Republican	Sam Graves (incumbent)	265,210	70.7
Democratic	Pam May	100,999	26.9
Libertarian	Andy Maidment	5,919	1.6
Green	Mike Diel	3,058	0.8
Total votes		375,186	100.0
Republican hold			

== See also ==
- Missouri's congressional districts
- List of United States congressional districts
