= Converse =

Converse may refer to:

== Mathematics and logic ==
- Converse (logic), the result of reversing the two parts of a definite or implicational statement
  - Converse implication, the converse of a material implication
  - Converse nonimplication, a logical connective which is the negation of the converse implication
- Converse (semantics), pairs of words that refer to a relationship from opposite points of view
- Converse accident, a logical fallacy that can occur in a statistical syllogism when an exception to a generalization is wrongly excluded
- Converse relation or inverse relation, in mathematics the relation that occurs when switching the order of the elements in a binary relation

== Places in the United States ==
- Converse, Blackford County, Indiana
- Converse, Indiana
- Converse, Louisiana
- Converse, Missouri
- Converse, South Carolina
- Converse, Texas
- Converse County, Wyoming
- Converse Basin, a grove of giant sequoia trees located in the Sequoia National Forest in the Sierra Nevada in eastern California

== Vessels ==
- USS Converse (DD-291), U.S. Navy destroyer
- USS Converse (DD-509), U.S. Navy destroyer

== Other uses ==
- Converse (surname), various people with the surname
- Converse (brand), an American shoe and clothing company
  - Converses or Chuck Taylor All-Stars, canvas and rubber shoes produced by the company
- Converse College, a women's college in Spartanburg, South Carolina
- Conversation, a form of communication between people following rules of etiquette
- Converse technique, a standard method in ear reconstruction
