= Grayson, Missouri =

- Village
- Interactive map of Grayson, Missouri
- Coordinates: 39°32′04″N 94°33′42″W
- Country: United States
- State: Missouri
- County: Clinton
- Platted: 1871
- Incorporated: 1925

Area
  - Total: 0.42 sq mi (1.09 km^{2})
  - Land: 0.42 sq mi (1.09 km^{2})
  - Water: 0 sq mi (0.00 km^{2})
- Elevation: 968 ft (295 m)

Population (2020)
  - Total: 61
  - Estimate (2021): 127
  - Density: 145.4/sq mi (56.15/km^{2})
- ZIP code: 64492
- FIPS code: 29-28882
- GNIS feature ID: 2806393

Grayson is a village in Clinton County, in the U.S. state of Missouri. The population was 61 at the 2020 census.

The community is on US Route 169 four miles north of Trimble and approximately six miles west-southwest of Plattsburg. The Smithville Reservoir on the Little Platte River is about 3.5 miles to the east.

== History ==
Grayson was platted in 1871, and named after the maiden name of the wife of the original owner of the town site. A variant name was Graysonville. A post office called Graysonville was established in 1871, the name was changed to Grayson in 1882, and the post office closed in 1954. Its population in the early 20th century was about 60. The community incorporated as a village in 1925.

== Demographics ==
Historical population
| Census | Pop. | Note | %± |
|---|---|---|---|
| 1930 | 85 | | — |
| 1940 | 51 | | −40.0% |
| 1950 | 64 | | 25.5% |
| 1960 | 44 | | −31.2% |
| 1970 | 62 | | 40.9% |
| 2020 | 61 | | — |
Missouri Census Data Center

Grayson was listed as a village by the United States Census Bureau until the 1930 U.S. census. It did not appear in subsequent censuses until it was listed as a census designated place in the 2020 U.S. census.

== Education ==
The school district is East Buchanan County C-1 School District
