= Mecca, Missouri =

Unincorporated community in Missouri, U.S.

Coordinates: 39°29′03″N 94°31′23″W

Mecca is an extinct hamlet in Clinton County, in the U.S. state of Missouri. The site has since been submerged by Smithville Lake.

== History ==
A post office called Mecca was established in 1898, and remained in operation until 1912. The name possibly is a transfer from Mecca, a holy city in Islam. The populated as about 25 in the early 20th Century.
