= Haynesville =

Haynesville or Hayneville can refer to a place in the United States:

- Hayneville, Alabama
- Hayneville, Georgia
- Haynesville, Louisiana
- Haynesville, Maine
- Haynesville, Missouri
- Haynesville, Texas

== See also ==
- Hainesville (disambiguation)
