= Paradise, Missouri =

Unincorporated community in Missouri, U.S.

- unincorporated community
- Location within Missouri Location within the United States
- Coordinates: 39°25′44″N 94°30′46″W
- Country: United States
- State: Missouri
- County: Clay

Area
  - Total: 0.40 sq mi (1.03 km^{2})
  - Land: 0.40 sq mi (1.03 km^{2})
  - Water: 0 sq mi (0.00 km^{2})
- Elevation: 932 ft (284 m)

Population (2020)
  - Total: 75
  - Density: 188.1/sq mi (72.62/km^{2})
- Time zone: UTC-6 (Central (CST))
  - Summer (DST): UTC-5 (CST)
- ZIP code: 64089
- FIPS code: 29-56126
- GNIS feature ID: 2806392

Paradise is an unincorporated community and census-designated place in northwest Clay County, Missouri, United States. The community lies between the two arms of the Smithville Lake on the Little Platte River. The city of Smithville lies across the lake to the southwest. The community is located along Missouri Route W about four miles southeast of Trimble in adjacent Clinton County. The population was 75 at the 2020 census.

== History ==
In 1832, the US Government deeded 40 acres (16 ha) of land at this location to Mr. Pleasant Gentry. The land was sold in 1850 to John Gosney, who surveyed the land. The developing town was named "Gosneyville". Gosneyville was renamed "Paradise" circa 1884.

A post office called Paradise was established in 1858, and remained in operation until 1907. The community was so named for the many churches in town relative to its small size.

== Demographics ==
Historical population
Census	Pop.	Note	%±
2020	75		—
U.S. Decennial Census

Paradise first appeared as a census designated place in the 2020 U.S. census.

Paradise CDP, Missouri – Racial and ethnic composition Note: the US Census treats Hispanic/Latino as an ethnic category. This table excludes Latinos from the racial categories and assigns them to a separate category. Hispanics/Latinos may be of any race.
Race / Ethnicity (NH = Non-Hispanic)	Pop 2020	2020
White alone (NH)	70	93.33%
Black or African American alone (NH)	0	0.00%
Native American or Alaska Native alone (NH)	0	0.00%
Asian alone (NH)	3	4.00%
Native Hawaiian or Pacific Islander alone (NH)	0	0.00%
Other race alone (NH)	0	0.00%
Mixed race or Multiracial (NH)	2	2.67%
Hispanic or Latino (any race)	0	0.00%
Total	75	100.00%

== Education ==
It is in the Smithville R-II School District.
