= Hainesville =

Hainesville may refer to:

- Hainesville, New Brunswick, Canada
- Hainesville, Illinois, United States
- Hainesville, New Jersey, United States
- Hainesville, Texas, United States
- Hainesville, Berkeley County, West Virginia, United States
- Hainesville, Hampshire County, West Virginia, United States

== See also ==
- Haynesville
