= Ira S. Haseltine =

American politician (1821–1899)

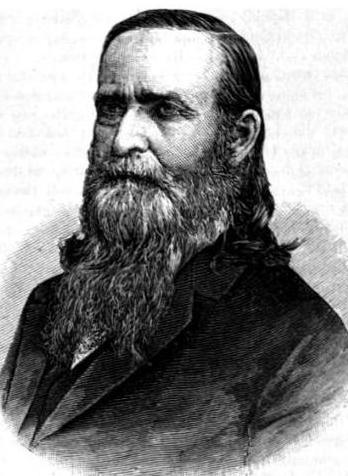
- From 1882's Public Men of To-Day by Phineas Camp Headley

Member of the United States House of Representatives
- In office March 4, 1881 – March 3, 1883
- Preceded by: James Richard Waddill
- Succeeded by: John Cosgrove
- Constituency: Missouri's 6th congressional district

Member of the Wisconsin State Assembly
- In office 1867–1868
- Preceded by: Henry L. Eaton
- Succeeded by: Warren C. S. Barron
- Constituency: 30th district (Richland County)

Personal details
- Born: July 13, 1821 Andover, Vermont, U.S.
- Died: January 13, 1899 (aged 77) Springfield, Missouri, U.S.
- Resting place: Hazelwood Cemetery, Springfield, Missouri, U.S.
- Party: Republican
- Other political affiliations: Greenback
- Spouse: Augusta Thomas (m. 1842)
- Children: 9
- Occupation: Attorney; Farmer

Ira Sherwin Haseltine (Note: Haseltine's name is frequently spelled "Hazeltine" but his gravestone, Vermont birth record and other sources verify that "Haseltine" is correct.) (July 13, 1821 – January 13, 1899) was a farmer and lawyer who was active in Wisconsin and Missouri. As a member of the Greenback Party, he represented Missouri's 6th congressional district in the United States House of Representatives from March 4, 1881 to March 3, 1883.

== Biography ==
Haseltine was born in Andover, Vermont on July 13, 1821, a son of Orien Haseltine and Rachel (Burton) Haseltine. He was raised and educated in Andover and in Waukesha County, Wisconsin, and taught school in Natchez, Mississippi for three years. He moved to what is now Richland Center, Wisconsin in 1842; Haseltine was one of the founders of the city in 1851, and was credited with both planning its layout and selecting its name. Haseltine studied law in Milwaukee with Don A. J. Upham; he was admitted to the bar in 1842 and practiced in Richland Center. Active in politics as a Republican, Haseltine was a delegate to the party's 1854 state convention and to the 1860 Republican National Convention. In 1866, he won election to the Wisconsin State Assembly, and he served one term, 1867 to 1868.

In 1870, Haseltine moved to a farm near Springfield, Missouri, where his sons and he started Haseltine orchards, a successful apple-growing operation. In the 1870s, Haseltine became an adherent of the Greenback Party, which opposed corporate monopolies and efforts to return to the pre-American Civil War gold standard. In 1880, he was a successful Greenback candidate for the U.S. House, and he served one term, March 4, 1881 to March 3, 1883. He was an unsuccessful candidate for reelection in 1882 and resumed his farming activities in Springfield.

Haseltine died in Springfield on January 13, 1899. He was buried in Hazelwood Cemetery in Springfield.

== Family ==
In 1846, Haseltine married Augusta Thomas (1828–1902). They were the parents of nine children who lived to adulthood, five sons and four daughters.

== Legacy ==
A large portion of Haseltine's Springfield apple growing operation has been preserved as The Haseltine Orchards Historic Area. Haseltine's home has been preserved as the Haseltine Estate, and is operated as a privately owned wedding venue.

== Notes ==
U.S. House of Representatives
Preceded by James Richard Waddill	Member of the U.S. House of Representatives from Missouri's 6th congressional district 1881–1883	Succeeded by John Cosgrove
