= James R. Waddill =

American politician (1842–1917)

James Richard Waddill
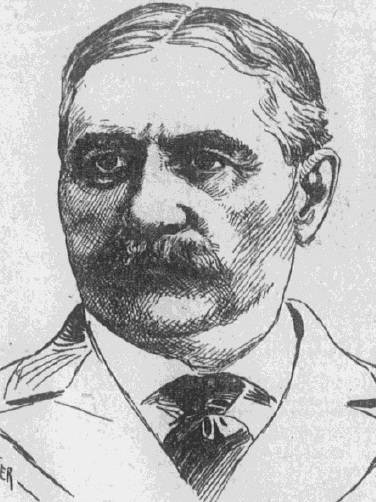
- St. Louis Republic, April 23, 1896.

Member of the U.S. House of Representatives from Missouri's 6th district
- In office March 4, 1879 – March 3, 1881
- Preceded by: Charles Henry Morgan
- Succeeded by: Ira S. Haseltine

Personal details
- Born: November 22, 1842 Springfield, Missouri, US
- Died: June 14, 1917 (aged 74) Deming, New Mexico, US
- Occupation: Lawyer, mining manager

James Richard Waddill (November 22, 1842 – June 14, 1917) was a Democratic U.S. Representative from Missouri's 6th congressional district for one term.

Waddill was born in Springfield, Missouri, the son of Judge John S. Waddill. He attended private schools and Springfield College. Waddill supported the Union during the American Civil War, enlisted as a private in the 8th Missouri Cavalry Regiment, and resigned in 1863 as a first lieutenant. Later newspaper articles referred to him as "major" and "colonel", suggesting he continued to serve in the state militia. He was admitted to the bar in 1864, and practiced in Springfield. He was city attorney from 1866 to 1867, and prosecuting attorney for Greene County, Missouri from 1874 to 1876.

In 1878 he was elected to Congress, and he served one term, March 4, 1879 to March 3, 1881. After leaving Congress, he resumed his law practice and served on the executive committee of the Missouri State Democratic Committee. In 1893 he was appointed state superintendent of insurance, and he served until 1899. In 1896 he was a candidate for the Democratic nomination for Governor of Missouri, but withdrew at the state convention when it became clear that Lon Vest Stephens had the support of enough delegates to win. Later in 1896 he was elected president of the National Insurance Commissioners' Association.

Waddill later engaged in a mining operation near Joplin, Missouri, and then relocated to Deming, New Mexico, where he practiced law and served as prosecuting attorney of the 6th Judicial District. He died in Deming, New Mexico and is buried in Mountain View Cemetery in Deming.

U.S. House of Representatives
Preceded by Charles Henry Morgan	Member of the U.S. House of Representatives from Missouri's 6th congressional district 1879–1881	Succeeded by Ira S. Haseltine
