= Perrin, Missouri =

Unincorporated community in Missouri, U.S.

Coordinates: 39°39′37″N 94°24′09″W

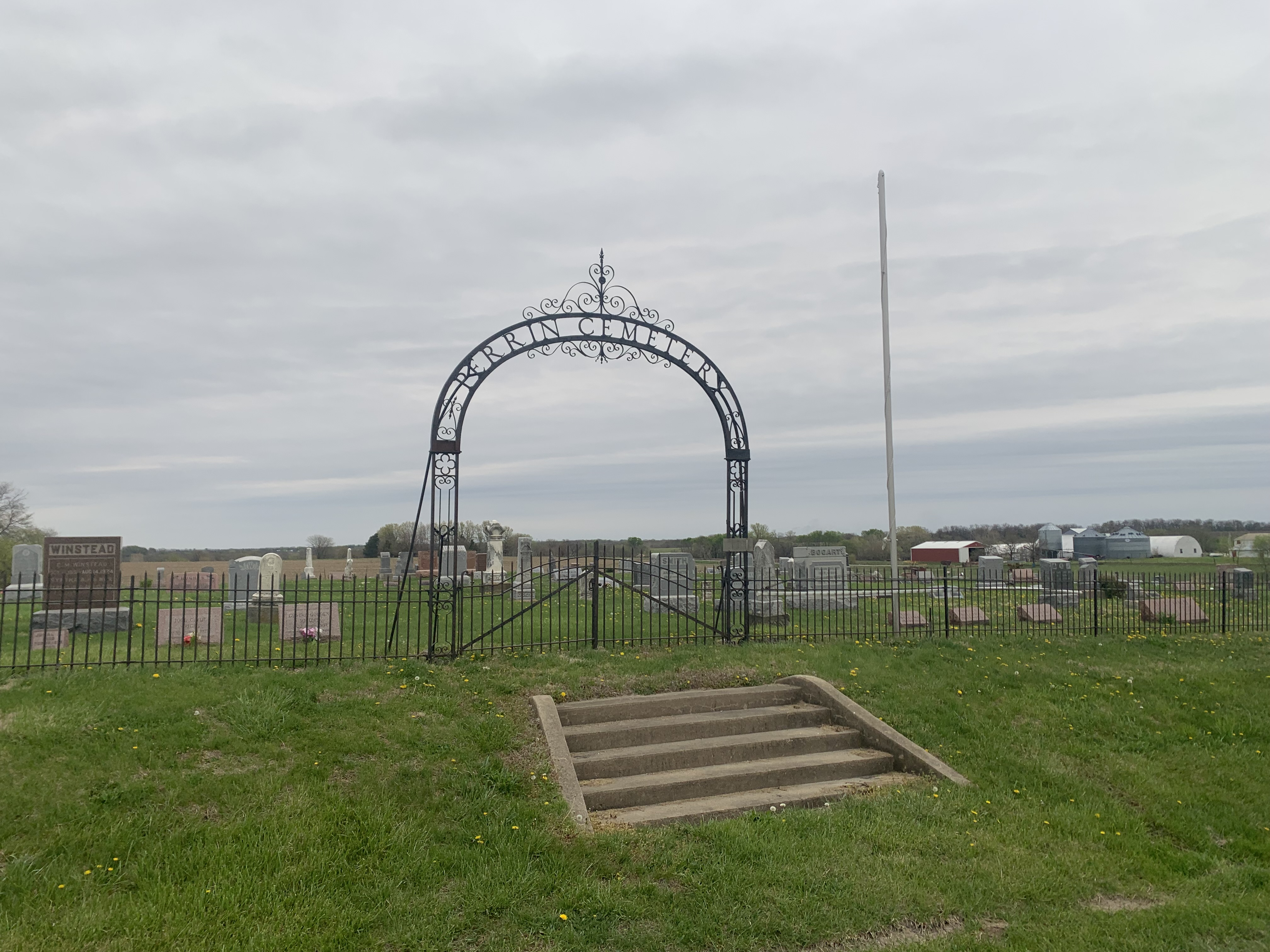
Perrin Cemetery at Perrin, Missouri

Perrin is an unincorporated community in Clinton County, in the U.S. state of Missouri.

== History ==
A post office called Perrin was established in 1873, and remained in operation until 1953. Besides the post office, Perrin had a railroad depot and a schoolhouse. The population was about 115 in the early 20th century.
