= Catherine Enz =

American politician

Catherine S. Enz (born March 16, 1954) is a former American Republican politician who served in the Missouri House of Representatives from 1994 to 2002. She represented Missouri's 99th House District. She was succeeded by Republican Mike Sutherland.

Born in St. Louis, Missouri, she graduated from McCluer High School in 1972. In 2002, she ran against U.S. House Minority Leader Dick Gephardt in Missouri's 3rd congressional district.
