= 2002 United States House of Representatives elections in Missouri =

- November 5, 2002

All 9 Missouri seats to the United States House of Representatives
	Majority party	Minority party
Party	Republican	Democratic
Last election	5	4
Seats won	5	4
Seat change	Steady	Steady
Popular vote	985,905	829,177
Percentage	53.19%	44.73%
Swing	▲4.36%	▼4.12%

Republican
40–50%
50–60%
60–70%
70–80%
80–90%
Democratic
40–50%
50–60%
60–70%
70–80%
80–90%

The 2002 House elections in Missouri occurred on November 5, 2002 to elect the members of the State of Missouri's delegation to the United States House of Representatives. Missouri had nine seats in the House, apportioned according to the 2000 United States census.

These elections were held concurrently with the United States Senate elections of 2002 (including a special election in Missouri), the United States House elections in other states, and various state and local elections.

== Overview ==
United States House of Representatives elections in Missouri, 2002
Party	Votes	Percentage	Seats before	Seats after	+/–
Republican	985,905	53.19%	5	5	±0
Democratic	829,177	44.73%	4	4	±0
Libertarian	34,217	1.85%	0	0	0
Progressive	4,262	0.23%	0	0	0
Independent	2	0.0%	0	0	0
Totals	1,853,563	100.00%	9	9	—
Voter turnout	%				

== Election results ==
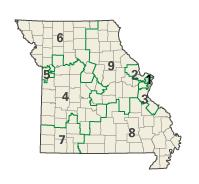
Missouri congressional districts in the 2002 elections

District	Incumbent	Party	First elected	Result	Candidates
Missouri 1	William Lacy Clay, Jr.	Democratic	2000	Re-elected	William Lacy Clay, Jr. (D) 70.11% Richard Schwadron (R) 27.09% Jim Higgins (L) 2.80%
Missouri 2	Todd Akin	Republican	2000	Re-elected	Todd Akin (R) 67.14% John Hogan (D) 31.03% Darla Maloney (L) 1.83%
Missouri 3	Dick Gephardt	Democratic	1976	Re-elected	Dick Gephardt (D) 59.06% Catherine Enz (R) 38.94% Dan Byington (L) 2.00%
Missouri 4	Ike Skelton	Democratic	1976	Re-elected	Ike Skelton (D) 67.64% Jim Noland (R) 30.66% Daniel Roy Nelson (L) 1.70%
Missouri 5	Karen McCarthy	Democratic	1994	Re-elected	Karen McCarthy (D) 65.88% Steve Gordon (R) 32.36% Jeanne Bojarski (L) 1.76%
Missouri 6	Sam Graves	Republican	2000	Re-elected	Sam Graves (R) 63.03% Cathy Rinehart (D) 35.18% Erik Buck (L) 1.79%
Missouri 7	Roy Blunt	Republican	1996	Re-elected	Roy Blunt (R) 74.81% Ron Lapham (D) 23.00% Doug Burlison (L) 2.19%
Missouri 8	Jo Ann Emerson	Republican	1996	Re-elected	Jo Ann Emerson (R) 71.76% Gene Curtis (D) 26.91% Eric Van Oostrom (L) 1.32%
Missouri 9	Kenny Hulshof	Republican	1996	Re-elected	Kenny Hulshof (R) 68.20% Don Deichman (D) 28.55% Keith Brekhus (G) 1.99% John Mruzik (L) 1.26%

== See also ==
- 2002 United States House of Representatives elections

== District 1 ==
2002 Missouri's 1st congressional district election
- November 5, 2002
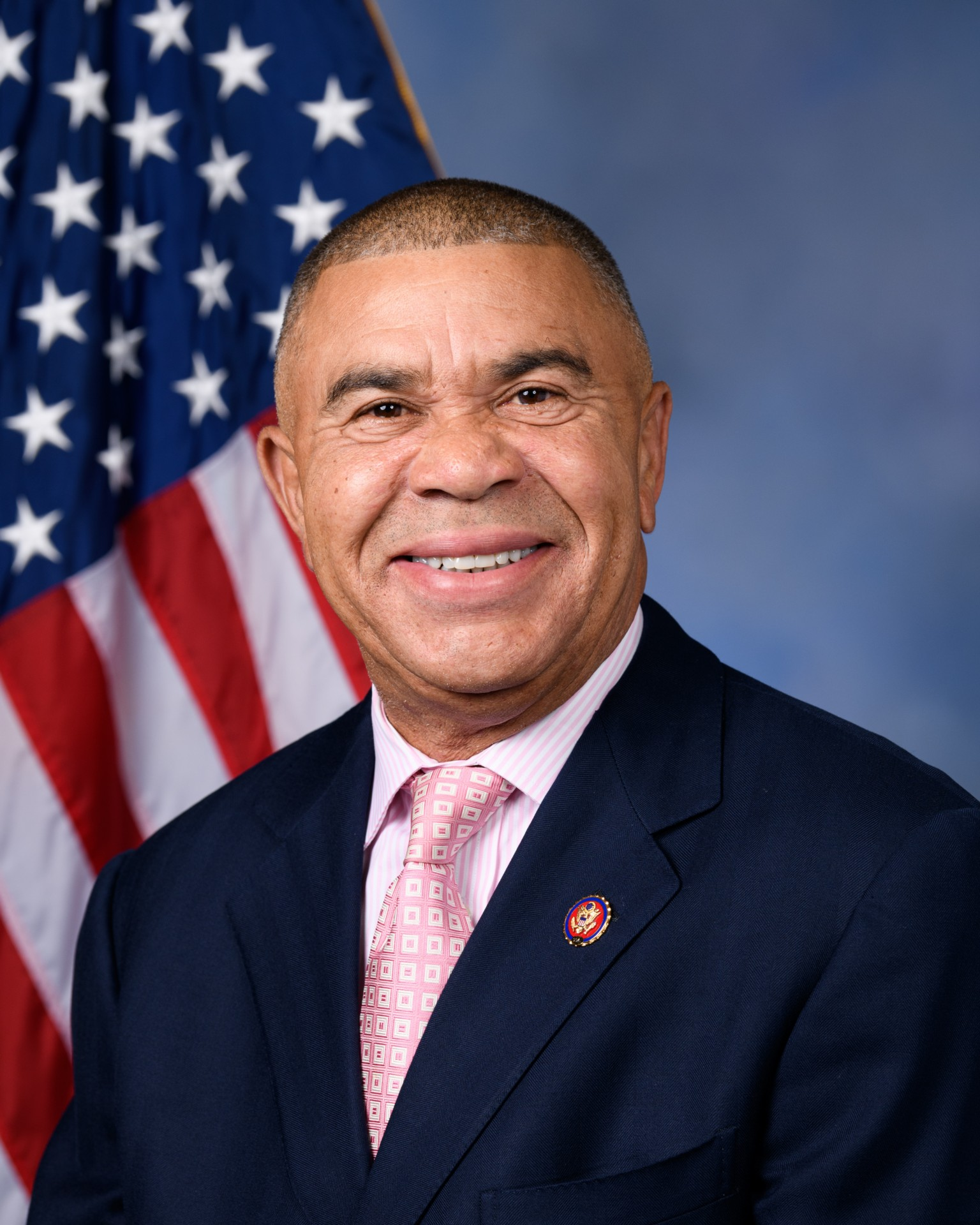

Nominee	William Lacy Clay, Jr.	Richard Schwadron
Party	Democratic	Republican
Popular vote	133,946	51,755
Percentage	70.1%	27.1%
U.S. Representative before election
William Lacy Clay, Jr.
Democratic
Elected U.S. Representative
William Lacy Clay, Jr.
Democratic

Incumbent Democrat William Lacy Clay, Jr., who was first elected in 2000, ran for re-election. Jr. was re-elected with 70.1% of the vote.

=== General election ===
==== Results ====
Missouri's 1st congressional district election, 2002
Party	Candidate	Votes	%
Democratic	William Lacy Clay, Jr. (incumbent)	133,946	70.1
Republican	Richard Schwadron	51,755	27.1
Libertarian	Jim Higgins	5,354	2.8
Total votes		191,055	100.0
Democratic hold			

== District 2 ==
2002 Missouri's 2nd congressional district election
- November 5, 2002
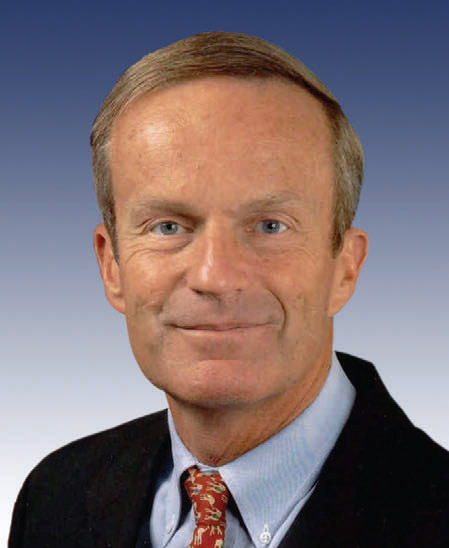

Nominee	Todd Akin	John Hogan
Party	Republican	Democratic
Popular vote	167,057	77,223
Percentage	67.1%	31.0%
U.S. Representative before election
Todd Akin
Republican
Elected U.S. Representative
Todd Akin
Republican

Incumbent Republican Todd Akin, who was first elected in 2000, ran for re-election. Akin was re-elected with 67.1% of the vote.

=== General election ===
==== Results ====
Missouri's 2nd congressional district election, 2002
Party	Candidate	Votes	%
Republican	Todd Akin (incumbent)	167,057	67.1
Democratic	John Hogan	77,223	31.0
Libertarian	Darla R. Maloney	4,548	1.8
Total votes		248,828	100.0
Republican hold			

== District 3 ==
2002 Missouri's 3rd congressional district election
- November 5, 2002
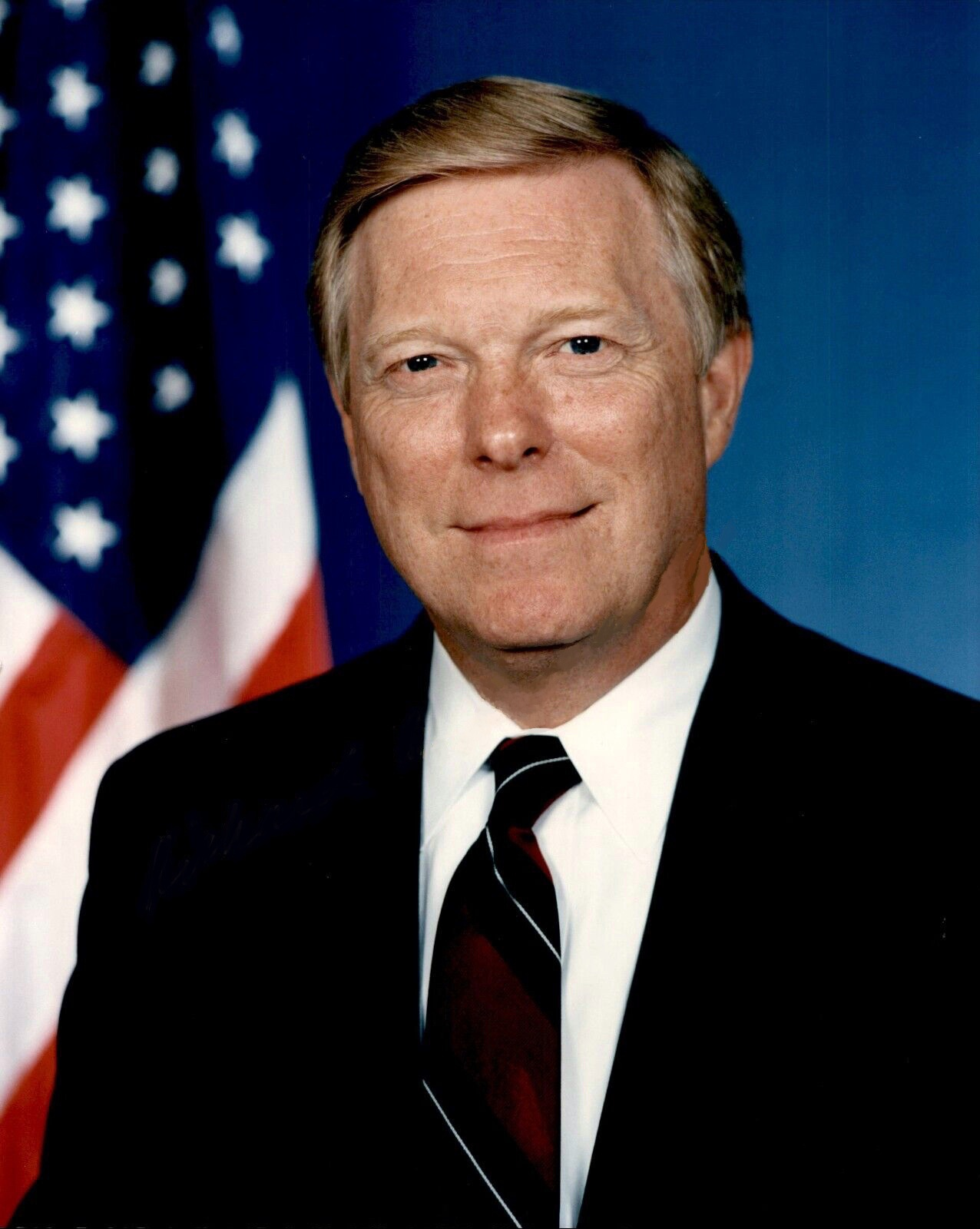

Nominee	Dick Gephardt	Catherine Enz
Party	Democratic	Republican
Popular vote	122,181	80,551
Percentage	59.1%	38.9%
U.S. Representative before election
Dick Gephardt
Democratic
Elected U.S. Representative
Dick Gephardt
Democratic

Incumbent Democrat Dick Gephardt, who was first elected in 1976, ran for re-election. Gephardt was re-elected with 59.1% of the vote.

=== General election ===
==== Results ====
Missouri's 3rd congressional district election, 2002
Party	Candidate	Votes	%
Democratic	Dick Gephardt (incumbent)	122,181	59.1
Republican	Catherine Enz	80,551	38.9
Libertarian	Daniel Byington	4,146	2.0
Total votes		206,878	100.0
Democratic hold			

== District 4 ==
2002 Missouri's 4th congressional district election
- November 5, 2002
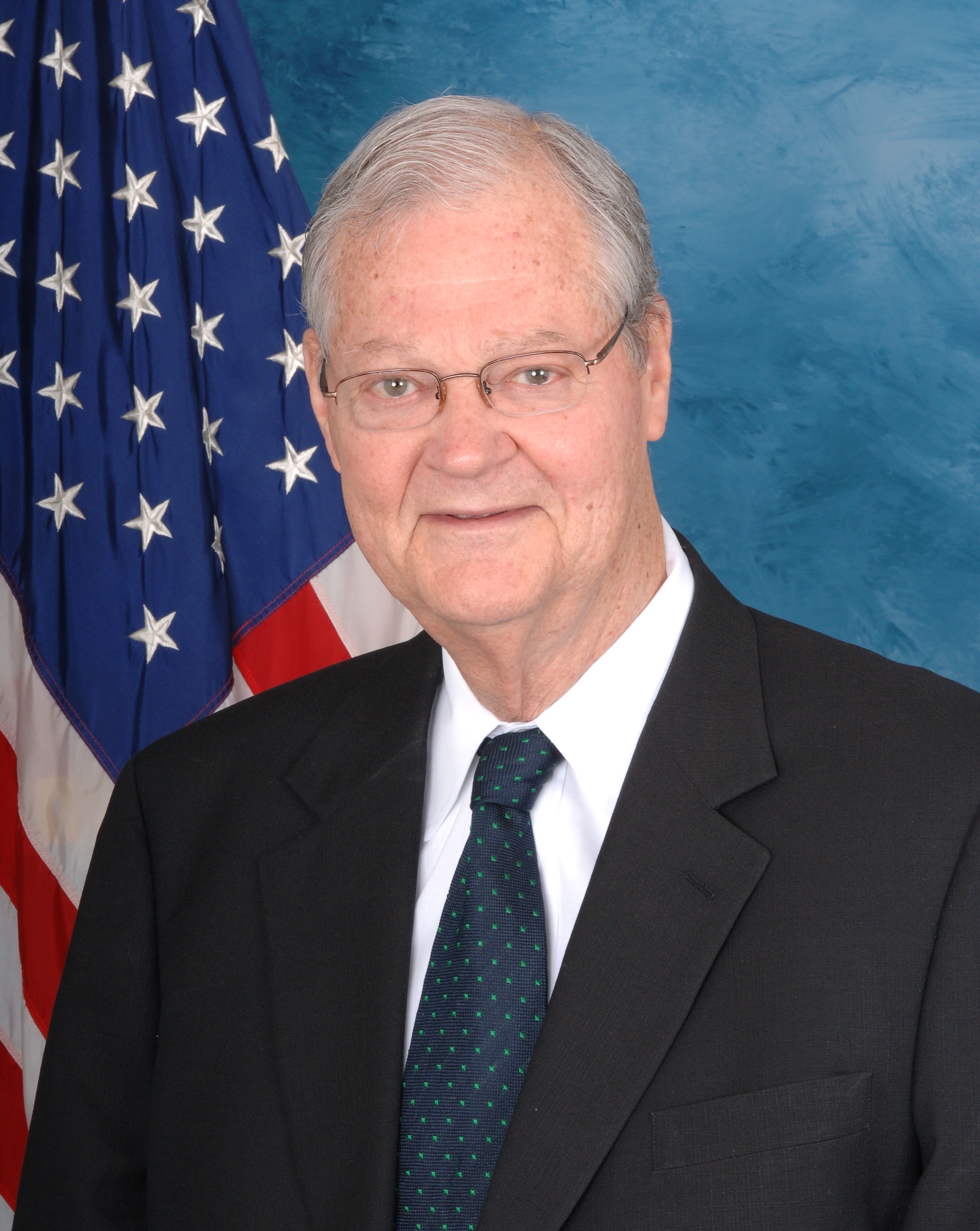

Nominee	Ike Skelton	James A. Noland
Party	Democratic	Republican
Popular vote	142,204	64,451
Percentage	67.6%	30.7%
U.S. Representative before election
Ike Skelton
Democratic
Elected U.S. Representative
Ike Skelton
Democratic

Incumbent Democrat Ike Skelton, who was first elected in 1976, ran for re-election. Skelton was re-elected with 67.6% of the vote.

=== General election ===
==== Results ====
Missouri's 4th congressional district election, 2002
Party	Candidate	Votes	%
Democratic	Ike Skelton (incumbent)	142,204	67.6
Republican	James A. Noland	64,451	30.7
Libertarian	Daniel Roy Nelson	3,583	1.7
Total votes		210,238	100.0
Democratic hold			

== District 5 ==
2002 Missouri's 5th congressional district election
- November 5, 2002
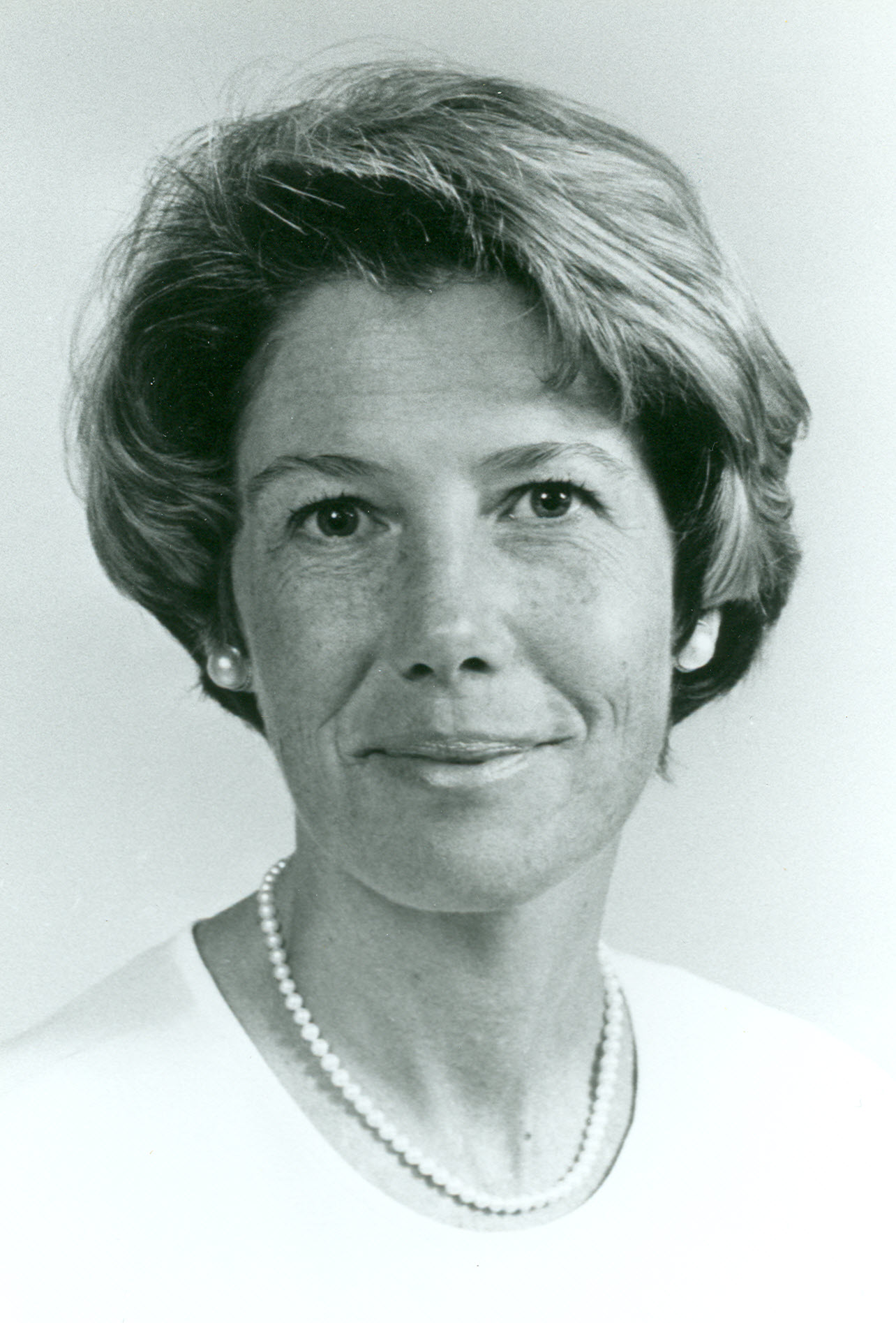

Nominee	Karen McCarthy	Steve Gordon
Party	Democratic	Republican
Popular vote	122,645	60,245
Percentage	65.9%	32.4%
U.S. Representative before election
Karen McCarthy
Democratic
Elected U.S. Representative
Karen McCarthy
Democratic

Incumbent Democrat Karen McCarthy, who was first elected in 1994, ran for re-election. McCarthy was re-elected with 65.9% of the vote.

=== General election ===
==== Results ====
Missouri's 5th congressional district election, 2002
Party	Candidate	Votes	%
Democratic	Karen McCarthy (incumbent)	122,645	65.9
Republican	Steve Gordon	60,245	32.4
Libertarian	Jeanne Bojarski	3,277	1.8
Total votes		186,167	100.0
Democratic hold			

== District 6 ==
2002 Missouri's 6th congressional district election
- November 5, 2002
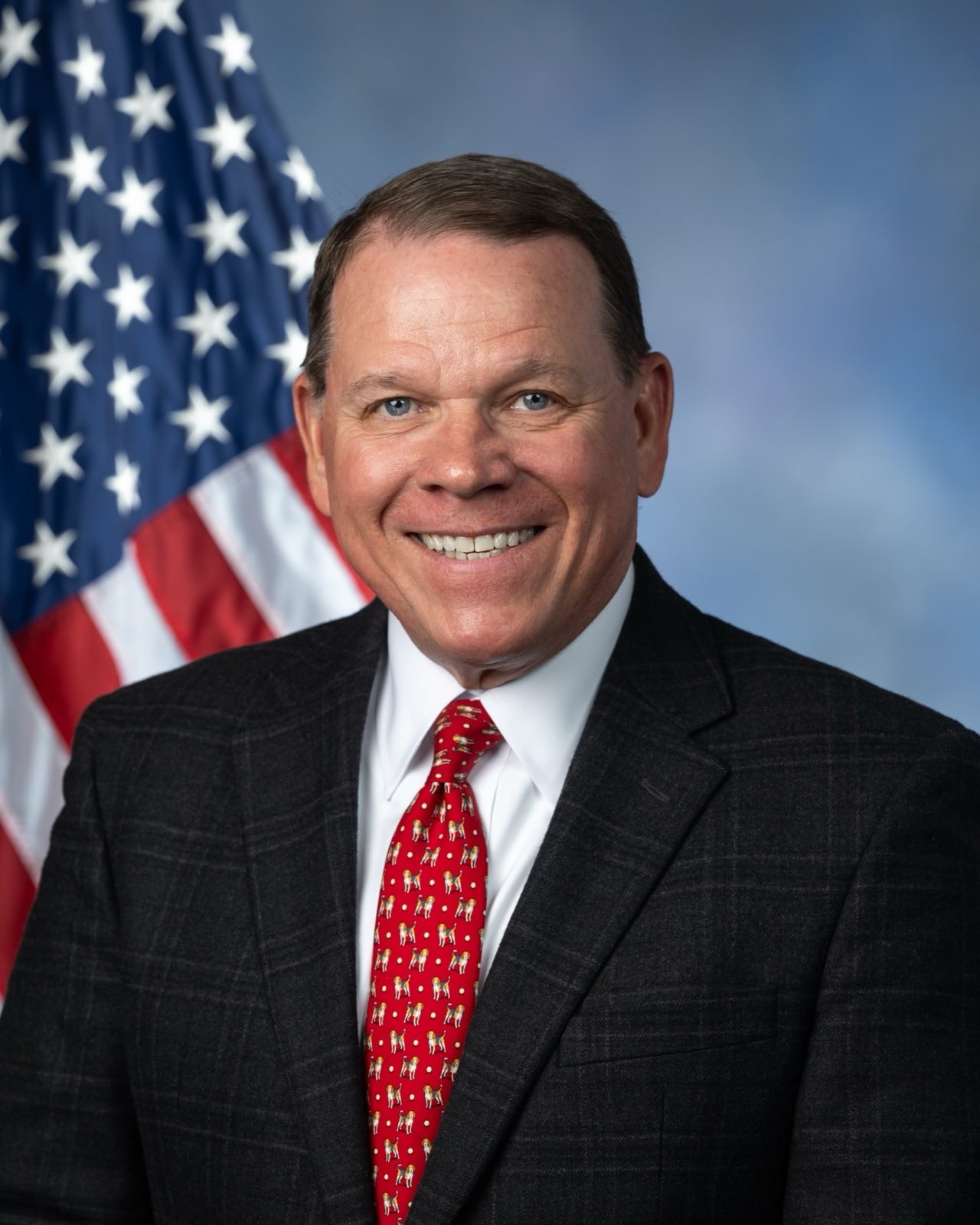

Nominee	Sam Graves	Cathy Rinehart
Party	Republican	Democratic
Popular vote	131,151	73,202
Percentage	63.0%	35.2%
U.S. Representative before election
Sam Graves
Republican
Elected U.S. Representative
Sam Graves
Republican

Incumbent Republican Sam Graves, who was first elected in 2000, ran for re-election. Graves was re-elected with 63.0% of the vote.

=== General election ===
==== Results ====
Missouri's 6th congressional district election, 2002
Party	Candidate	Votes	%
Republican	Sam Graves (incumbent)	131,151	63.0
Democratic	Cathy Rinehart	73,202	35.2
Libertarian	Erik Buck	3,735	1.8
Total votes		208,088	100.0
Republican hold			

== District 7 ==
2002 Missouri's 7th congressional district election
- November 5, 2002
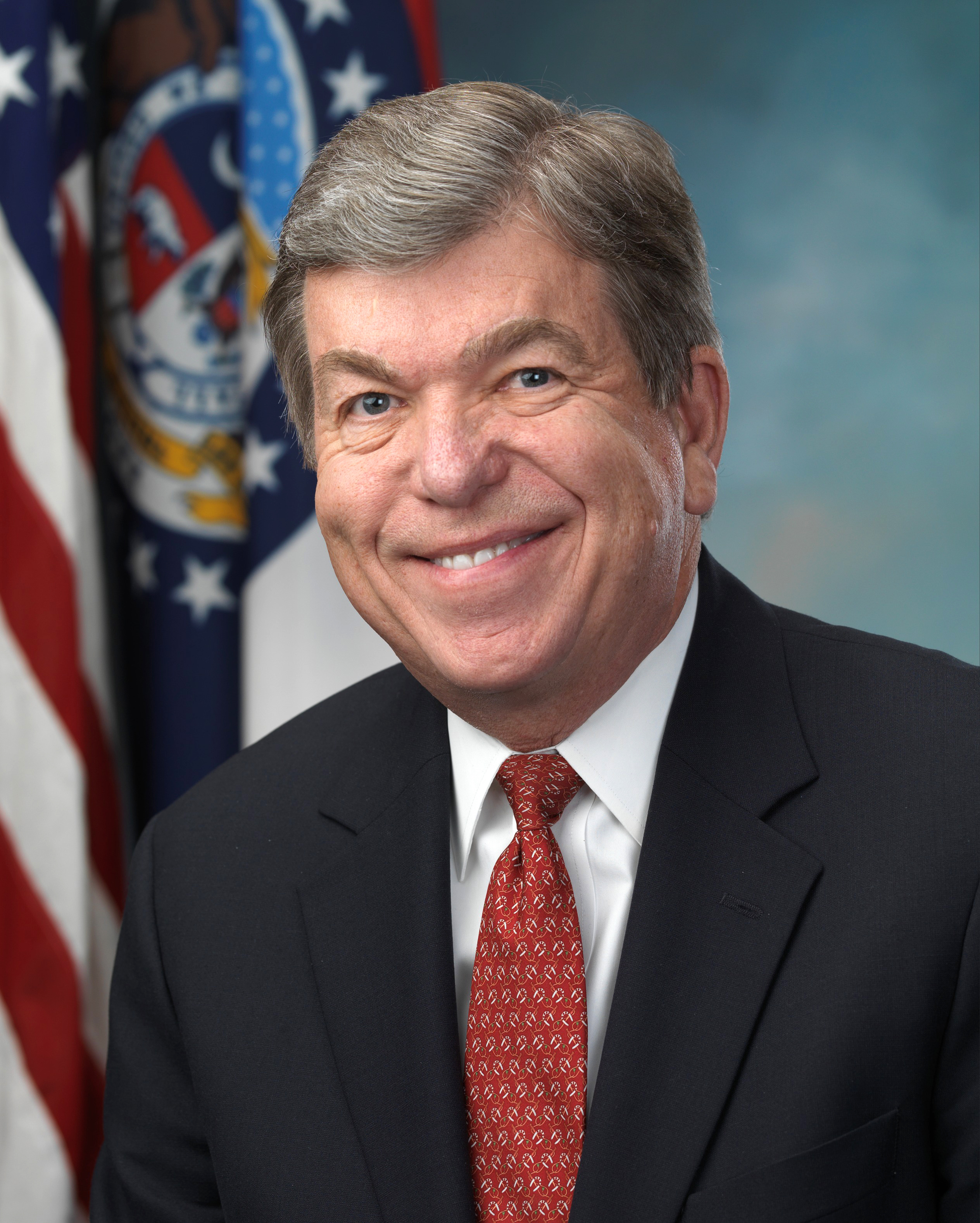

Nominee	Roy Blunt	Ron Lapham
Party	Republican	Democratic
Popular vote	149,519	45,964
Percentage	74.8%	23.0%
U.S. Representative before election
Roy Blunt
Republican
Elected U.S. Representative
Roy Blunt
Republican

Incumbent Republican Roy Blunt, who was first elected in 1996, ran for re-election. Blunt was re-elected with 74.8% of the vote.

=== General election ===
==== Results ====
Missouri's 7th congressional district election, 2002
Party	Candidate	Votes	%
Republican	Roy Blunt (incumbent)	149,519	74.8
Democratic	Ron Lapham	45,964	23.0
Libertarian	Doug Burlison	4,378	2.2
Write-In	Steven L. Reed	2	0.0
Total votes		199,863	100.0
Republican hold			

== District 8 ==
2002 Missouri's 8th congressional district election
- November 5, 2002
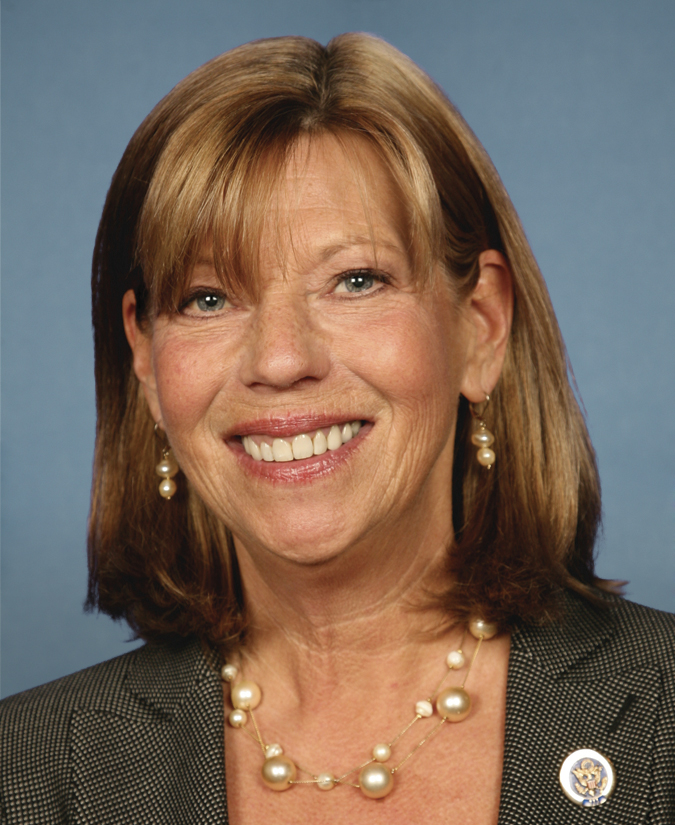

Nominee	Jo Ann Emerson	Gene Curtis
Party	Republican	Democratic
Popular vote	135,144	50,686
Percentage	71.8%	26.9%
U.S. Representative before election
Jo Ann Emerson
Republican
Elected U.S. Representative
Jo Ann Emerson
Republican

Incumbent Republican Jo Ann Emerson, who was first elected in 1996, ran for re-election. Emerson was re-elected with 71.8% of the vote.

=== General election ===
==== Results ====
Missouri's 8th congressional district election, 2002
Party	Candidate	Votes	%
Republican	Jo Ann Emerson (incumbent)	135,144	71.8
Democratic	Gene Curtis	50,686	26.9
Libertarian	Eric Van Oostrom	2,491	1.3
Total votes		188,321	100.0
Republican hold			

== District 9 ==
2002 Missouri's 9th congressional district election
- November 5, 2002
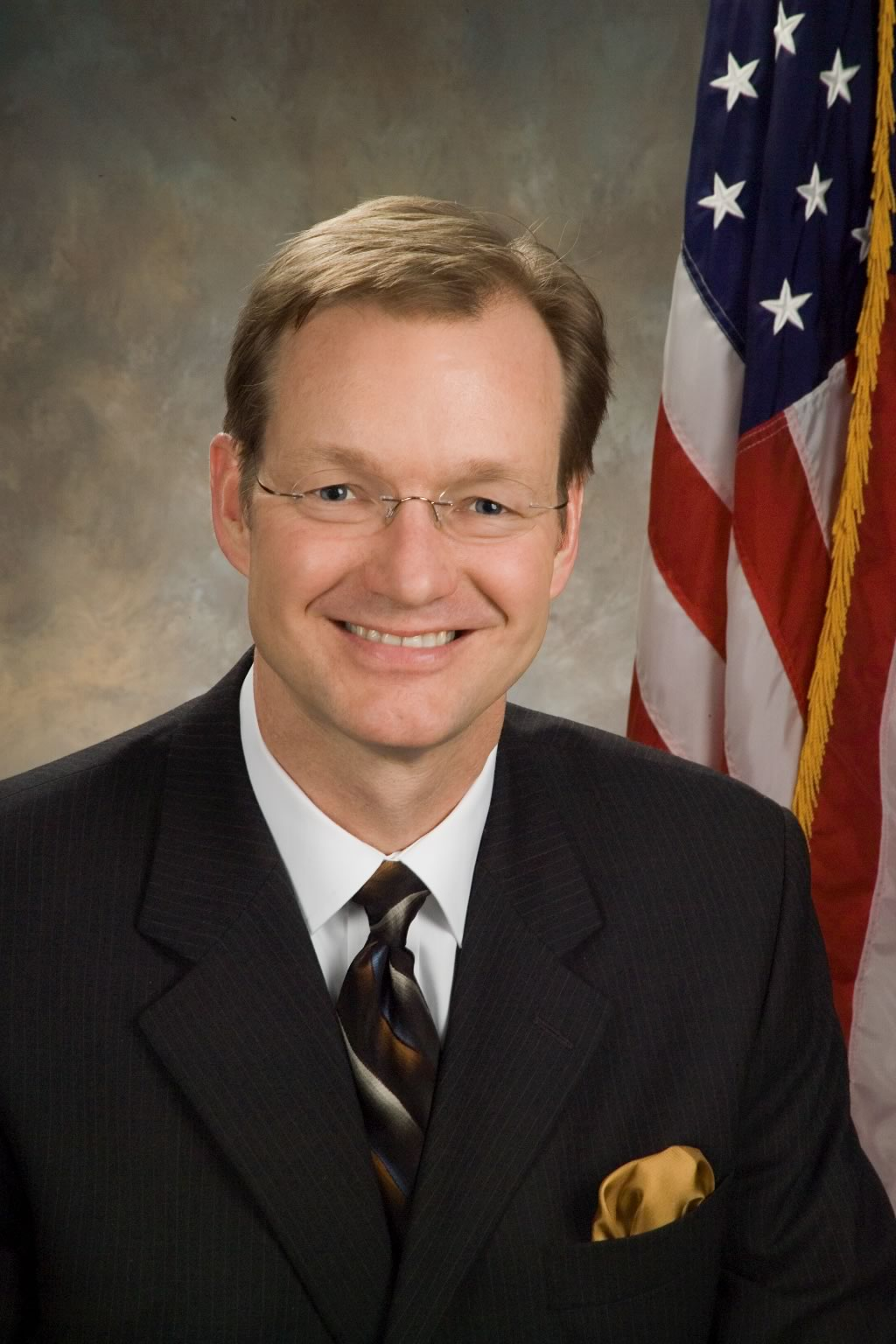

Nominee	Kenny Hulshof	Donald M. Deichman
Party	Republican	Democratic
Popular vote	146,032	61,126
Percentage	68.2%	28.5%
U.S. Representative before election
Kenny Hulshof
Republican
Elected U.S. Representative
Kenny Hulshof
Republican

Incumbent Republican Kenny Hulshof, who was first elected in 1996, ran for re-election. Hulshof was re-elected with 68.2% of the vote.

=== General election ===
==== Results ====
Missouri's 9th congressional district election, 2002
Party	Candidate	Votes	%
Republican	Kenny Hulshof (incumbent)	146,032	68.2
Democratic	Donald M. Deichman	61,126	28.5
Green	Keith Brekhus	4,262	2.0
Libertarian	John Mruzik	2,705	1.3
Total votes		214,125	100.0
Republican hold			
