= Keystone, Missouri =

Extinct Hamlet in the Missouri, U.S.

Coordinates: 39°41′30″N 94°18′58″W

Keystone is an extinct hamlet in northeastern Clinton County, in the U.S. state of Missouri.

== History ==
A post office at Keystone Station of the Leavenworth branch of the Chicago, Rock Island, and Pacific Railroad was established in 1874 and closed in 1919. A nearby settlement known as West Keystone existed as well. The name of Keystone is survived by a lone county road.
