= Braley, Missouri =

Unincorporated community in the American state of Missouri

Coordinates: 39°40′51″N 94°25′36″W

Braley is an unincorporated community in Clinton County, in the U.S. state of Missouri.

The community was named in honor of Charles A. Braley, a railroad official.
