= John Cosgrove (Missouri politician) =

American politician (1839–1925)

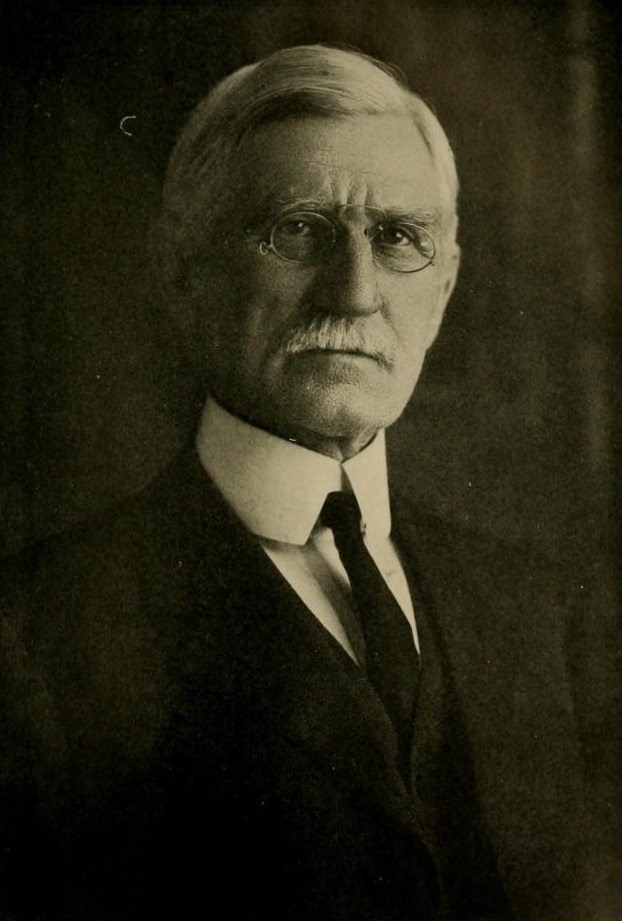
- Cosgrove in 1919

Member of the U.S. House of Representatives from Missouri's 6th district
- In office March 4, 1883 – March 3, 1885
- Preceded by: Ira S. Haseltine
- Succeeded by: John T. Heard

Personal details
- Born: September 12, 1839 Alexandria Bay, New York, US
- Died: August 15, 1925 (aged 88) Boonville, Missouri, US
- Party: Republican
- Profession: Lawyer, politician

John Cosgrove (September 12, 1839 – August 15, 1925) was an American politician. He was a member of the United States House of Representatives from Missouri.

== Biography ==
Cosgrove was born on September 12, 1839, in Alexandria Bay, New York, to James Cosgrove and Georgia Augusta Bliss. Educated at public schools in Redwood, New York, he studied law at Watertown and in October 1863, he was admitted to the bar. He journeyed to participate in the Pike's Peak gold rush after graduating from high school. He first practiced law in New York, moving to Boonville, Missouri, which he travelled through on the way to Pike's Peak and enjoyed. In Boonville, he continued practicing law. He was its city attorney from 1870 to 1871; he later served nonconsecutive terms from April 1877 to April 1878, and from April 1879 to April 1881. In 1872, he was elected Cooper County's prosecuting attorney.

A Democrat, Cosgrove was a delegate of the 1872 and 1920 Democratic National Conventions. He represented Missouri's 6th congressional district in the United States House of Representatives from March 4, 1883 to March 3, 1885. He withdrew from the 1884 election.

After serving in Congress, Cosgrove continued practicing law in Boonville. In 1906, Canadian Magazine noted a trial in which he misquoted scripture from Joshua 10, which the opposing attorney challenged to the judge; after Cosgrove corrected himself, he remained unchallenged. He died on August 15, 1925, aged 88, in Boonville, from kidney disease and influenza. At the time of his death, he was one of Missouri's oldest active lawyers. He is buried in the Walnut Grove Cemetery, in Boonville.

U.S. House of Representatives
Preceded by Ira S. Haseltine	Member of the U.S. House of Representatives from Missouri's 6th congressional district 1883–1885	Succeeded by John T. Heard
