= Turney, Missouri =

- Village
- Location of Turney, Missouri
- Coordinates: 39°38′15″N 94°19′16″W
- Country: United States
- State: Missouri
- County: Clinton

Area
  - Total: 0.46 sq mi (1.20 km^{2})
  - Land: 0.46 sq mi (1.20 km^{2})
  - Water: 0 sq mi (0.00 km^{2})
- Elevation: 1,047 ft (319 m)

Population (2020)
  - Total: 114
  - Density: 245.5/sq mi (94.77/km^{2})
- Time zone: UTC-6 (Central (CST))
  - Summer (DST): UTC-5 (CDT)
- ZIP code: 64493
- Area code: 816
- FIPS code: 29-74176
- GNIS feature ID: 2400009

Turney is a village in Clinton County, Missouri and is part of the Kansas City metropolitan area within the United States. The population was 114 at the 2020 census.

== History ==
Turney was laid out in 1869, and named after Thomas E. Turney, a state politician. A post office called Turney has been in operation since 1895.

== Geography ==
According to the United States Census Bureau, the village has a total area of 0.46 square miles (1.19 km^{2}), all land.

== Demographics ==
Historical population
Census	Pop.	Note	%±
1880	93		—
1890	163		75.3%
1900	186		14.1%
1910	212		14.0%
1920	212		0.0%
1930	205		−3.3%
1940	175		−14.6%
1950	152		−13.1%
1960	144		−5.3%
1970	142		−1.4%
1980	379		166.9%
1990	155		−59.1%
2000	155		0.0%
2010	148		−4.5%
2020	114		−23.0%
U.S. Decennial Census

=== 2010 census ===
As of the census of 2010, there were 148 people, 64 households, and 36 families residing in the village. The population density was 321.7 inhabitants per square mile (124.2/km^{2}). There were 73 housing units at an average density of 158.7 per square mile (61.3/km^{2}). The racial makeup of the village was 99.3% White and 0.7% Native American. Hispanic or Latino of any race were 0.7% of the population.

There were 64 households, of which 31.3% had children under the age of 18 living with them, 45.3% were married couples living together, 6.3% had a female householder with no husband present, 4.7% had a male householder with no wife present, and 43.8% were non-families. 39.1% of all households were made up of individuals, and 11% had someone living alone who was 65 years of age or older. The average household size was 2.31 and the average family size was 3.06.

The median age in the village was 38.8 years. 25.7% of residents were under the age of 18; 4% were between the ages of 18 and 24; 31% were from 25 to 44; 25.1% were from 45 to 64; and 14.2% were 65 years of age or older. The gender makeup of the village was 55.4% male and 44.6% female.

=== 2000 census ===
As of the census of 2000, there were 155 people, 62 households, and 48 families residing in the village. The population density was 325.9 inhabitants per square mile (125.8/km^{2}). There were 74 housing units at an average density of 155.6 per square mile (60.1/km^{2}). The racial makeup of the village was 95.48% White, 0.65% African American, 1.29% Native American, 1.29% from other races, and 1.29% from two or more races. Hispanic or Latino of any race were 0.65% of the population.

There were 62 households, out of which 27.4% had children under the age of 18 living with them, 61.3% were married couples living together, 12.9% had a female householder with no husband present, and 21.0% were non-families. 17.7% of all households were made up of individuals, and 6.5% had someone living alone who was 65 years of age or older. The average household size was 2.50 and the average family size was 2.71.

In the village, the population was spread out, with 25.2% under the age of 18, 5.2% from 18 to 24, 31.6% from 25 to 44, 21.9% from 45 to 64, and 16.1% who were 65 years of age or older. The median age was 38 years. For every 100 females, there were 106.7 males. For every 100 females age 18 and over, there were 90.2 males.

The median income for a household in the village was $36,528, and the median income for a family was $36,429. Males had a median income of $24,583 versus $20,536 for females. The per capita income for the village was $14,221. About 6.0% of families and 9.6% of the population were below the poverty line, including 17.9% of those under the age of eighteen and none of those 65 or over.

== Education ==
The school district is the Lathrop R-II School District.
