= Haynesville, Missouri =

Unincorporated community in Missouri, U.S.

Coordinates: 39°27′41″N 94°18′57″W

Haynesville is an unincorporated community in southern Clinton County, in the U.S. state of Missouri. The community lies about one quarter mile east of I-35 and north of Missouri Route PP. The community of Holt is located approximately two miles to the southwest on the west side of I-35 in northern Clay County.

== History ==
Haynesville was platted in 1842 and named after Collet Haynes, an early settler. A post office called Hainesville was established in 1843. The spelling was changed to Haynesville in 1880 and the post office closed in 1881.
