= Barnesville, Clinton County, Missouri =

Extinct community in Missouri, U.S.

Coordinates: 39°30′15″N 94°13′53″W

Barnesville is an unincorporated community in Clinton County, in the U.S. state of Missouri.

== History ==
Barnesville was founded in 1857. A post office called Barnesville was established in 1860, and remained in operation until 1872.
