= Converse, Missouri =

Extinct community in Missouri, U.S.

Coordinates: 39°29′56″N 94°16′35″W

Converse is an extinct community in southeastern Clinton County, in the U.S. state of Missouri.

== History ==
Converse was laid out in 1870 when the railroad was extended to that point, and named for a railroad worker. A post office was established at Converse in 1870, and remained in operation until 1951.
