= Converse (surname) =

Converse is a surname. Notable people with the surname include:

- Amasa Converse (1795–1872), American Presbyterian minister and newspaper editor
- Blake Converse (born 1965), American vice admiral
- Charles Crozat Converse (1832–1918), American Attorney and composer
- Connie Converse (born 1924), American singer-songwriter
- Florence Converse (1871–1967), American author
- Frank Converse (born 1938), American actor
- Frederick Converse (1871–1940), American composer of classical music
- George A. Converse (1844–1909), United States Navy rear admiral
- George L. Converse (1827–1897), American politician, U.S. Representative from Ohio from 1879 to 1881
- Harriet Maxwell Converse (1836–1903), American author and folklorist
- Julius Converse (1798–1885), American politician, Governor of Vermont from 1872 to 1874
- Larry Converse, American politician, Democratic member of the New Hampshire House of Representatives from 2014 to 2016
- Marquis Mills Converse (1861–1931), American founder of the Converse Rubber Shoe Company
- Peggy Converse (1905–2001), American actress
- Philip Converse (1928–2014), American political scientist
