= Smithville Lake =

Lake in Missouri, U.S.

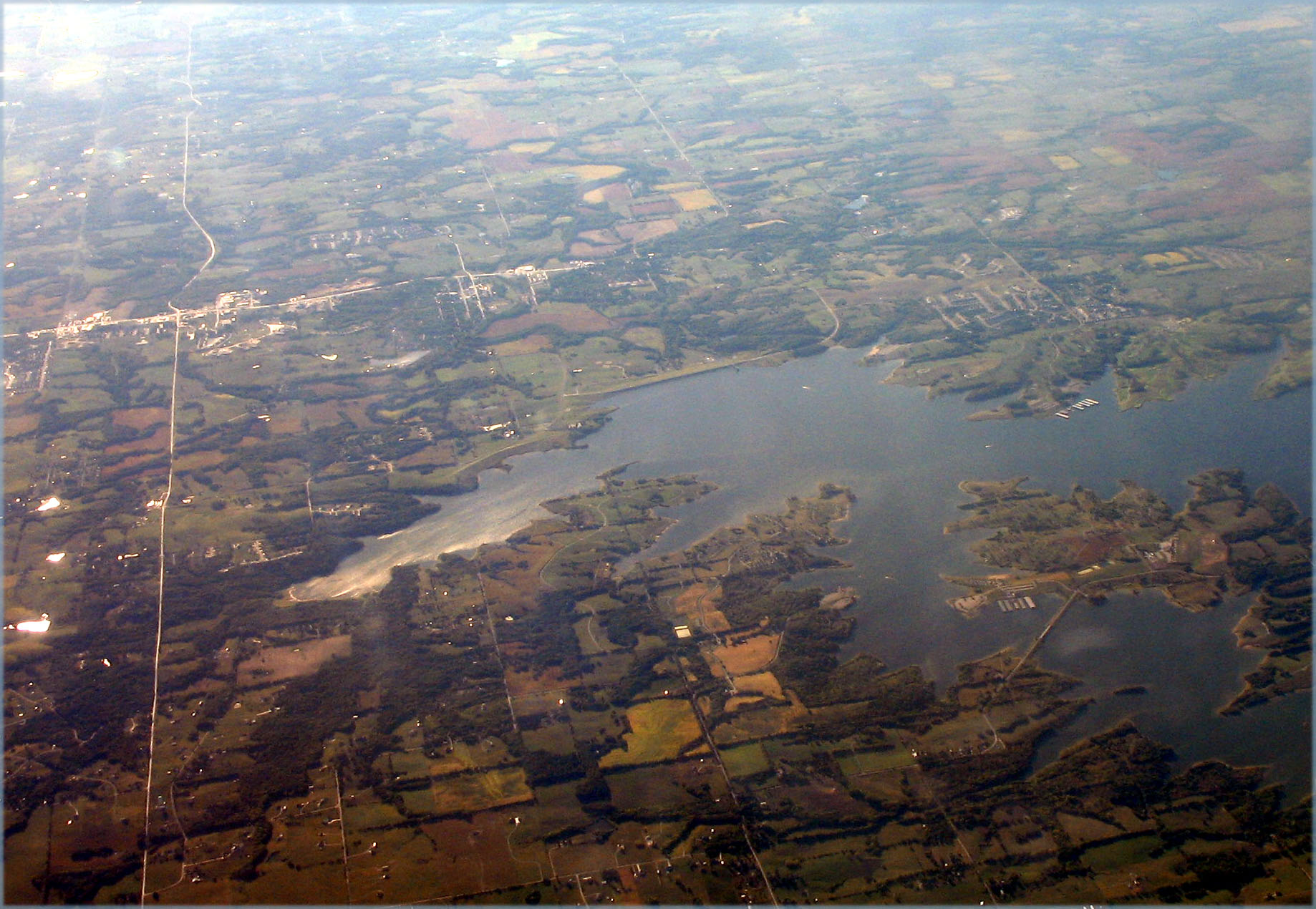
- Lower portion of the lake from the east. The dam is just above the center.

- Location within Missouri Location within the United States
- Location: Clay / Clinton counties, Missouri, United States
- Coordinates: 39°25′N 94°32′W
- Type: reservoir
- Primary inflows: Little Platte River
- Primary outflows: Little Platte River
- Basin countries: United States
- First flooded: 1979
- Surface area: 7,190 acres (29.1 km^{2})
- Water volume: 246,500 acre⋅ft (304,100,000 m^{3})
- Shore length^{1}: 175 miles (282 km)
- Surface elevation: 797 ft (243 m)
- Website: Smithville Lake USACE
- ^{1} Shore length is not a well-defined measure.

Smithville Lake is a 7,190-acre (2,910 ha) reservoir on the Little Platte branch of the Platte River in Clay County, Missouri near Smithville. It is the largest body of water in the Kansas City metropolitan area. The reservoir provides the water supply for Smithville, Missouri

The lake was built and is administered by the Kansas City office of the United States Army Corps of Engineers and was built primarily for flood control. The lake is 10th largest of Corps lakes in the district, but third in terms of shoreline. It has 5,000 acres (20 km^{2}) of public land and 175 miles (282 km) of shoreline.

== History ==
Smithville Dam was authorized in 1965. Construction began in 1972 with the dam being completed in 1977. Impoundment began in 1979. The dam is of earthen construction and is 4,000 feet (1,200 m) long. At its crest it is 105 feet (32 m) high and contains a maximum capacity of 246,500 acre-feet (304,100,000 m^{3}). It is owned and operated by the Corps of Engineers.

== Geography ==
The Smithville Lake spans two counties in Missouri, with the bulk of the reservoir located in northwestern Clay County and the rest in southwestern Clinton County, Missouri.

=== Communities ===
The largest community around the Smithville Lake is the eponymous Smithville, Missouri located directly west of the reservoir. The other communities around the lake include the cities Plattsburg and Trimble and the census-designated place of Paradise. The unincorporated community of Arley is located just southeast of the reservoir's easternmost arm.

== Recreation ==
Many recreation activities are present around the Smithville Lake including boating, fishing, golfing, and hunting. Four major parks are located along the reservoir in Clay County: Camp Branch Park, Crows Creek Park, Little Platte Park, and Smith's Fork City Park. There are two state protected lands located around Smithville Lake which are both in Clinton County: Trimble Wildlife Management Area and Smithville Lake State Wildlife Area.

=== Visitor Center ===
The Jerry L. Litton Visitor Center by the dam tells the history of the area, as well as has memorabilia about the Congressman who died in a plane crash on election night after winning the Democratic nomination for U.S. Senate in 1976.

=== Fishing ===
The Smithville Lake is home to many species of fish; some of the most popular include bass, catfish, crappie, and walleye. The Missouri Department of Conservation has identified hundreds of fish attractors around the reservoir to aid fishers.
