= Holt, Missouri =

- City
- Coordinates: 39°27′15″N 94°20′19″W
- Country: United States
- State: Missouri
- Counties: Clay, Clinton
- Settled: 1867; 159 years ago
- Named for: Jeremiah Abel Holt

Area
  - Total: 0.52 sq mi (1.35 km^{2})
  - Land: 0.52 sq mi (1.35 km^{2})
  - Water: 0 sq mi (0.00 km^{2})
- Elevation: 850 ft (260 m)

Population (2020)
  - Total: 471
  - Density: 906.8/sq mi (350.13/km^{2})
- Time zone: UTC-6 (CST)
  - Summer (DST): UTC-5 (CDT)
- ZIP code: 64048
- Area code: 816
- FIPS code: 29-32752
- GNIS feature ID: 2394408
- Website: www.cityofholt.com

Holt is a city in Clay and Clinton counties in the U.S. state of Missouri and is part of the Kansas City metropolitan area. The population was 471 at the 2020 census.

== History ==
Holt was platted in 1867. The city was named for Jeremiah Abel Holt (1811–1886), who donated the land in 1837 and who was one of the first settlers in the area, a native of Orange County, North Carolina.

Holt has the distinction of holding the world record for the fastest accumulation of rainfall. On June 22, 1947, Holt received 12 inches (300 mm) of rain in 42 minutes.

== Geography ==
Holt is located on the Clinton - Clay county line west of I-35. Missouri Route 33 passes through the community. The Lake Arrowhead reservoir on Muddy Fork of Clear Creek lies north of the community.

According to the United States Census Bureau, the city has a total area of 0.45 square miles (1.17 km^{2}), all land.

== Demographics ==
Historical population
Census	Pop.	Note	%±
1880	162		—
1890	259		59.9%
1900	339		30.9%
1910	336		−0.9%
1920	398		18.5%
1930	357		−10.3%
1940	320		−10.4%
1950	270		−15.6%
1960	281		4.1%
1970	319		13.5%
1980	276		−13.5%
1990	311		12.7%
2000	405		30.2%
2010	447		10.4%
2020	471		5.4%
U.S. Decennial Census

=== Racial and ethnic composition ===
Holt city, Missouri – Racial and ethnic composition Note: the US Census treats Hispanic/Latino as an ethnic category. This table excludes Latinos from the racial categories and assigns them to a separate category. Hispanics/Latinos may be of any race.
Race / Ethnicity (NH = Non-Hispanic)	Pop 2000	Pop 2010	Pop 2020	% 2000	% 2010	% 2020
White alone (NH)	391	403	414	96.54%	90.16%	87.90%
Black or African American alone (NH)	3	3	3	0.74%	0.67%	0.64%
Native American or Alaska Native alone (NH)	2	7	6	0.49%	1.57%	1.27%
Asian alone (NH)	0	5	1	0.00%	1.12%	0.21%
Native Hawaiian or Pacific Islander alone (NH)	0	0	1	0.00%	0.00%	0.21%
Other race alone (NH)	5	0	6	1.23%	0.00%	1.27%
Mixed race or Multiracial (NH)	0	10	29	0.00%	2.24%	6.16%
Hispanic or Latino (any race)	4	19	11	0.99%	4.25%	2.34%
Total	405	447	471	100.00%	100.00%	100.00%

=== 2010 census ===
As of the census of 2010, there were 447 people, 176 households, and 119 families living in the city. The population density was 993.3 inhabitants per square mile (383.5/km^{2}). There were 193 housing units at an average density of 428.9 units per square mile (165.6 units/km^{2}). The racial makeup of the city was 92.4% White, 0.7% African American, 1.6% Native American, 1.1% Asian, 0.4% from other races, and 3.8% from two or more races. Hispanic or Latino of any race were 4.3% of the population.

There were 176 households, of which 38.6% had children under the age of 18 living with them, 52.3% were married couples living together, 10.8% had a female householder with no husband present, 4.5% had a male householder with no wife present, and 32.4% were non-families. 28.4% of all households were made up of individuals, and 15.9% had someone living alone who was 65 years of age or older. The average household size was 2.54 and the average family size was 3.08.

The median age in the city was 34.3 years. 28.4% of residents were under the age of 18; 6.3% were between the ages of 18 and 24; 28.1% were from 25 to 44; 24.6% were from 45 to 64; and 12.5% were 65 years of age or older. The gender makeup of the city was 48.1% male and 51.9% female.

=== 2000 census ===
As of the census of 2000, there were 405 people, 152 households, and 100 families living in the city. The population density was 1,119.4 inhabitants per square mile (432.2/km^{2}). There were 165 housing units at an average density of 456.0 units per square mile (176.1 units/km^{2}). The racial makeup of the city was 97.28% White, 0.74% African American, 0.49% Native American, 1.23% from other races, and 0.25% from two or more races. Hispanic or Latino of any race were 0.99% of the population.

There were 152 households, out of which 34.9% had children under the age of 18 living with them, 57.2% were married couples living together, 3.9% had a female householder with no husband present, and 34.2% were non-families. 30.9% of all households were made up of individuals, and 18.4% had someone living alone who was 65 years of age or older. The average household size was 2.66 and the average family size was 3.31.

In the city, the population was spread out, with 30.9% under the age of 18, 9.4% from 18 to 24, 30.6% from 25 to 44, 16.5% from 45 to 64, and 12.6% who were 65 years of age or older. The median age was 33 years. For every 100 females, there were 96.6 males. For every 100 females age 18 and over, there were 95.8 males.

The median income for a household in the city was $38,438, and the median income for a family was $55,375. Males had a median income of $35,556 versus $21,111 for females. The per capita income for the city was $16,841. About 10.1% of families and 16.6% of the population were below the poverty line, including 33.6% of those under age 18 and 8.5% of those age 65 or over.

== Education ==
It is in the Kearney R-I School District.

== Notable person ==
- Lew Krausse Jr., Major League Baseball pitcher from 1961 to 1974, lived in Holt during his later years
