= Trimble, Missouri =

- City
- Location of Trimble, Missouri
- Coordinates: 39°28′34″N 94°33′43″W
- Country: United States
- State: Missouri
- County: Clinton
- Incorporated: 1909

Area
  - Total: 0.59 sq mi (1.53 km^{2})
  - Land: 0.59 sq mi (1.53 km^{2})
  - Water: 0 sq mi (0.00 km^{2})
- Elevation: 948 ft (289 m)

Population (2020)
  - Total: 573
  - Density: 966.8/sq mi (373.29/km^{2})
- Time zone: UTC-6 (Central (CST))
  - Summer (DST): UTC-5 (CDT)
- ZIP code: 64492
- Area code: 816
- FIPS code: 29-73852
- GNIS feature ID: 2397053
- Website: TrimbleMissouri.org

Trimble is a city in southwestern Clinton County, Missouri and is part of the Kansas City metropolitan area within the United States. The population was 573 at the 2020 census.

== History ==
Trimble was named after J. M. Trimble, a railroad official. The city was originally called Carpenter's Store; the town site was platted and present name adopted when the railroad was extended to that point. A post office called Carpenters Store was established in 1858, and the name was changed to Trimble in 1899.

== Geography ==
Trimble is located In the southwest corner of the county. It lies on Missouri Route F and U.S. Route 169. Smithville Lake on the Little Platte River lies one mile to the east.

According to the United States Census Bureau, the city has a total area of 0.50 square miles (1.29 km^{2}), all land.

== Demographics ==
Historical population
Census	Pop.	Note	%±
1910	222		—
1920	118		−46.8%
1930	138		16.9%
1940	126		−8.7%
1950	141		11.9%
1960	185		31.2%
1970	206		11.4%
1980	262		27.2%
1990	405		54.6%
2000	451		11.4%
2010	646		43.2%
2020	573		−11.3%
U.S. Decennial Census

=== 2010 census ===
As of the census of 2010, there were 646 people, 269 households, and 177 families residing in the city. The population density was 1,292.0 inhabitants per square mile (498.8/km^{2}). There were 283 housing units at an average density of 566.0 per square mile (218.5/km^{2}). The racial makeup of the city was 97.7% White, 0.6% African American, 0.3% from other races, and 1.4% from two or more races. Hispanic or Latino of any race were 0.9% of the population.

There were 269 households, of which 32.0% had children under the age of 18 living with them, 46.1% were married couples living together, 10.8% had a female householder with no husband present, 8.9% had a male householder with no wife present, and 34.2% were non-families. 28.6% of all households were made up of individuals, and 6.7% had someone living alone who was 65 years of age or older. The average household size was 2.40 and the average family size was 2.93.

The median age in the city was 37.3 years. 24.5% of residents were under the age of 18; 9.6% were between the ages of 18 and 24; 25.3% were from 25 to 44; 28.7% were from 45 to 64; and 11.9% were 65 years of age or older. The gender makeup of the city was 51.1% male and 48.9% female.

=== 2000 census ===
As of the census of 2000, there were 451 people, 188 households, and 116 families residing in the city. The population density was 923.0 inhabitants per square mile (356.4/km^{2}). There were 199 housing units at an average density of 407.3 per square mile (157.3/km^{2}). The racial makeup of the city was 97.56% White, 0.44% African American, 0.89% Asian, and 1.11% from two or more races. Hispanic or Latino of any race were 0.22% of the population.

There were 188 households, out of which 33.0% had children under the age of 18 living with them, 51.1% were married couples living together, 6.4% had a female householder with no husband present, and 37.8% were non-families. 34.6% of all households were made up of individuals, and 18.1% had someone living alone who was 65 years of age or older. The average household size was 2.40 and the average family size was 3.13.

In the city the population was spread out, with 28.6% under the age of 18, 6.2% from 18 to 24, 29.7% from 25 to 44, 23.7% from 45 to 64, and 11.8% who were 65 years of age or older. The median age was 37 years. For every 100 females, there were 101.3 males. For every 100 females age 18 and over, there were 97.5 males.

The median income for a household in the city was $38,571, and the median income for a family was $47,813. Males had a median income of $37,639 versus $21,645 for females. The per capita income for the city was $17,715. About 7.1% of families and 10.7% of the population were below the poverty line, including 9.8% of those under age 18 and 26.7% of those age 65 or over.

== Education ==
It is in the Clinton County R-III School District.
