= Clinton County, Missouri =

County in Missouri, United States

- County
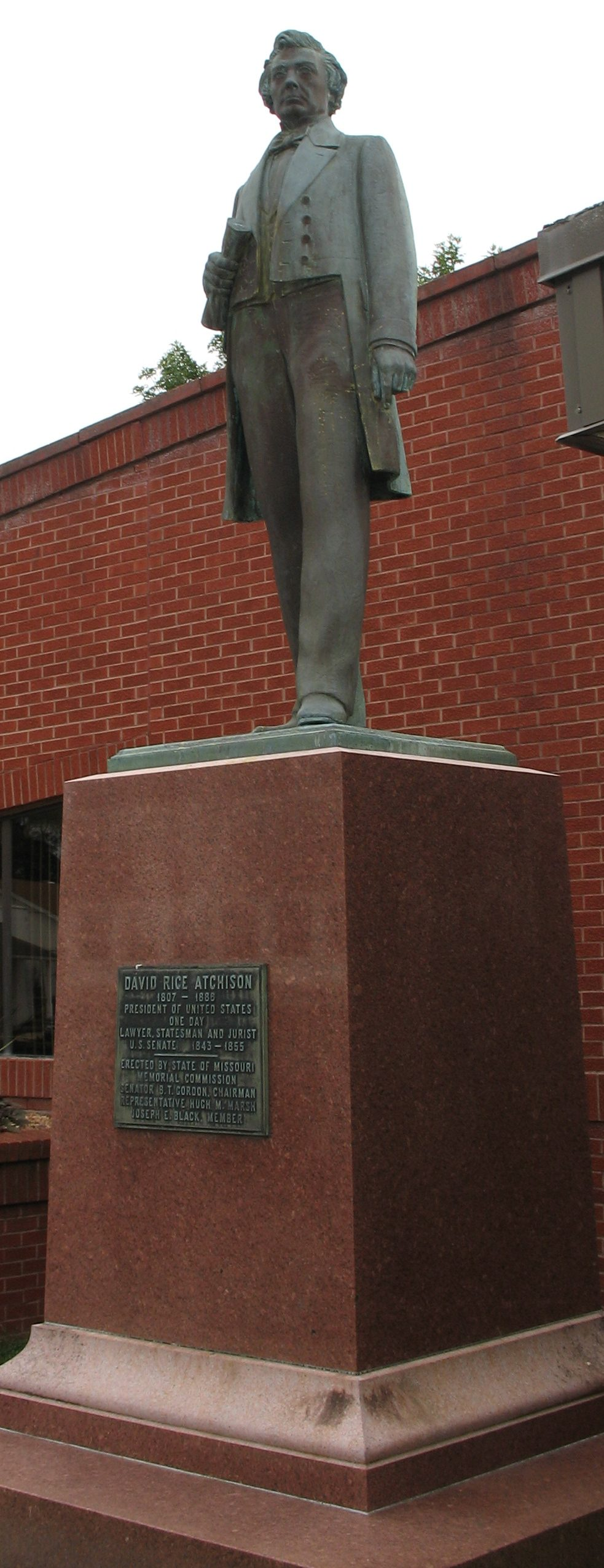
- Statue of "President for a Day" David Rice Atchison at the Clinton County Courthouse.

- Location within the U.S. state of Missouri
- Coordinates: 39°36′N 94°24′W
- Country: United States
- State: Missouri
- Founded: January 2, 1833
- Named for: DeWitt Clinton
- Seat: Plattsburg
- Largest city: Cameron

Area
  - Total: 423 sq mi (1,100 km^{2})
  - Land: 419 sq mi (1,090 km^{2})
  - Water: 4.5 sq mi (12 km^{2}) 1.1%

Population (2020)
  - Total: 21,184
  - Estimate (2025): 21,661 ▲
  - Density: 50/sq mi (19/km^{2})
- Time zone: UTC−6 (Central)
  - Summer (DST): UTC−5 (CDT)
- Congressional district: 6th
- Website: www.clintoncomo.org

Clinton County is a county located in the U.S. state of Missouri and is part of the Kansas City metropolitan area. As of the 2020 U.S. Census, the county had a population of 21,184. Its county seat is Plattsburg. The county was organized January 2, 1833, and named for Governor DeWitt Clinton of New York. The county seat of Plattsburg derives its name from a town of a similar name that is the county seat of Clinton County, New York, which was also named for the Governor.

== Geography ==
According to the U.S. Census Bureau, the county has a total area of 423 square miles (1,100 km^{2}), of which 419 square miles (1,090 km^{2}) is land and 4.5 square miles (12 km^{2}) (1.1%) is water.

=== Adjacent counties ===
- DeKalb County (north)
- Caldwell County (east)
- Ray County (southeast)
- Clay County (south)
- Platte County (southwest)
- Buchanan County (west)

=== Major highways ===
- I-35 / Route 110 (CKC)
- US 69
- US 169
- Route 33
- Route 116
- Route 121

== Demographics ==
Historical population
Census	Pop.	Note	%±
1840	2,724		—
1850	3,786		39.0%
1860	7,848		107.3%
1870	14,063		79.2%
1880	16,073		14.3%
1890	17,138		6.6%
1900	17,363		1.3%
1910	15,297		−11.9%
1920	14,461		−5.5%
1930	13,505		−6.6%
1940	13,261		−1.8%
1950	11,726		−11.6%
1960	11,588		−1.2%
1970	12,462		7.5%
1980	15,916		27.7%
1990	16,595		4.3%
2000	18,979		14.4%
2010	20,743		9.3%
2020	21,184		2.1%
2025 (est.)	21,661	▲	2.3%
U.S. Decennial Census; 1790-1960 1900-1990; 1990-2000 2010

=== 2020 census ===
As of the 2020 census, the county had a population of 21,184. The median age was 42.4 years. 23.4% of residents were under the age of 18 and 19.7% of residents were 65 years of age or older. For every 100 females there were 99.8 males, and for every 100 females age 18 and over there were 98.9 males.

The racial makeup of the county was 91.7% White, 1.0% Black or African American, 0.4% American Indian and Alaska Native, 0.4% Asian, 0.0% Native Hawaiian and Pacific Islander, 0.6% from some other race, and 5.9% from two or more races. Hispanic or Latino residents of any race comprised 2.4% of the population.

24.2% of residents lived in urban areas, while 75.8% lived in rural areas.

There were 8,173 households in the county, of which 31.4% had children under the age of 18 living with them and 20.8% had a female householder with no spouse or partner present. About 24.5% of all households were made up of individuals and 11.6% had someone living alone who was 65 years of age or older.

There were 8,934 housing units, of which 8.5% were vacant. Among occupied housing units, 76.9% were owner-occupied and 23.1% were renter-occupied. The homeowner vacancy rate was 1.2% and the rental vacancy rate was 8.5%.

=== Racial and ethnic composition ===
Clinton County, Missouri – Racial and ethnic composition Note: the US Census treats Hispanic/Latino as an ethnic category. This table excludes Latinos from the racial categories and assigns them to a separate category. Hispanics/Latinos may be of any race.
Race / Ethnicity (NH = Non-Hispanic)	Pop 1980	Pop 1990	Pop 2000	Pop 2010	Pop 2020	% 1980	% 1990	% 2000	% 2010	% 2020
White alone (NH)	15,400	16,033	18,191	19,606	19,264	96.76%	96.61%	95.85%	94.52%	90.94%
Black or African American alone (NH)	336	326	284	284	202	2.11%	1.96%	1.50%	1.37%	0.95%
Native American or Alaska Native alone (NH)	48	71	65	144	71	0.30%	0.43%	0.34%	0.69%	0.34%
Asian alone (NH)	25	22	32	72	85	0.16%	0.13%	0.17%	0.35%	0.40%
Native Hawaiian or Pacific Islander alone (NH)	x	x	1	2	5	x	x	0.01%	0.01%	0.02%
Other race alone (NH)	14	4	14	14	49	0.09%	0.02%	0.07%	0.07%	0.23%
Mixed race or Multiracial (NH)	x	x	187	299	1,006	x	x	0.99%	1.44%	4.75%
Hispanic or Latino (any race)	93	139	205	322	502	0.58%	0.84%	1.08%	1.55%	2.37%
Total	15,916	16,595	18,979	20,743	21,184	100.00%	100.00%	100.00%	100.00%	100.00%

=== 2017 American Community Survey ===
As of the census of 2017, there were 20,554 people, 8,990 households, and 8,299 families residing in the county. The population density was 49.5 people per square mile (19.1 people/km^{2}). There were 7,877 housing units at an average density of 19 per square mile (7.3/km^{2}). The racial makeup of the county was 95.5% White, 1.4% Black or African American, 0.7% Native American, 0.4% Asian, 0.01% Pacific Islander, 0.27% from other races, and 1.9% from two or more races. Approximately 2.1% of the population were Hispanic or Latino of any race.

There were 7,152 households, out of which 34.90% had children under the age of 18 living with them, 61.40% were married couples living together, 8.80% had a female householder with no husband present, and 25.90% were non-families. 22.00% of all households were made up of individuals, and 10.50% had someone living alone who was 65 years of age or older. The average household size was 2.59 and the average family size was 3.03.

In the county, the population was spread out, with 26.80% under the age of 18, 7.40% from 18 to 24, 28.20% from 25 to 44, 23.50% from 45 to 64, and 14.10% who were 65 years of age or older. The median age was 38 years. For every 100 females there were 96.00 males. For every 100 females age 18 and over, there were 91.60 males.

The median income for a household in the county was $57,486, and the median income for a family was $48,244. Males had a median income of $36,307 versus $22,991 for females. The per capita income for the county was $19,056. About 7.30% of families and 9.30% of the population were below the poverty line, including 11.30% of those under age 18 and 12.70% of those age 65 or over.

== Education ==
School districts with territory in the county include:

- Cameron R-I School District
- Clinton County R-III School District
- East Buchanan County C-1 School District
- Kearney R-I School District
- Lathrop R-II School District
- Lawson R-XIV School District
- Osborn R-O School District
- Smithville R-II School District
- Stewartsville C-2 School District

=== Public schools ===
- Cameron R-I School District – Cameron
  - Parkview Elementary School (PK-02)
  - Cameron Intermediate School (03-05)
  - Cameron Veterans Middle School (06-08)
  - Cameron High School (09-12)
- Clinton County R-III School District – Plattsburg
  - Ellis Elementary School (PK-04)
  - Clinton County Middle School (05-08)
  - Plattsburg High School (09-12)
- East Buchanan County C-1 School District – Gower
  - East Buchanan Elementary School (PK-05)
  - East Buchanan Middle School (06-08)
  - East Buchanan High School (09-12)
- Lathrop R-II School District – Lathrop
  - Lathrop Elementary School (PK-05)
  - Lathrop Middle School (06-08)
  - Lathrop High School (09-12)

=== Public libraries ===
- Cameron Public Library

== Communities ==
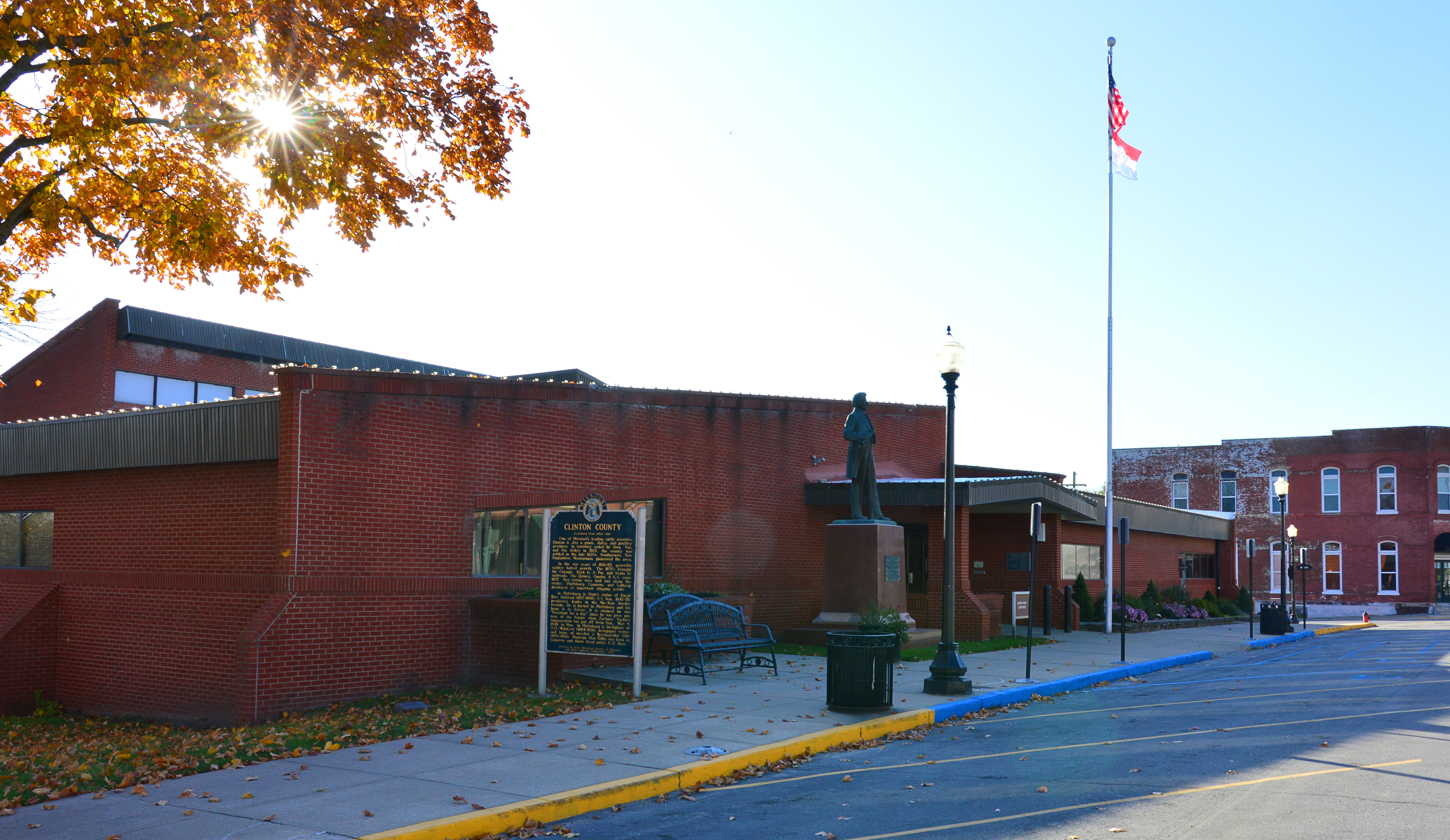
Clinton County Courthouse in Plattsburg

=== Cities ===
- Cameron (partly in DeKalb County)
- Gower (partly in Buchanan County)
- Holt (partly in Clay County)
- Lathrop
- Osborn (partly in DeKalb County)
- Plattsburg (county seat)
- Trimble

=== Village ===
- Grayson
- Turney

=== Census-designated places ===
- Lake Arrowhead

=== Other unincorporated places ===
- Barnesville
- Braley
- Converse
- Haynesville
- Hemple
- Keystone
- Lilly
- Mecca
- Perrin
- Starfield

== Politics ==
=== Local ===
The Republican Party predominantly controls politics at the local level in Clinton County. Republicans hold all but one of the elected positions in the county.

Clinton County, Missouri

Elected countywide officials
Assessor	Cindy Carter	Republican
Circuit Clerk	Misty Dean	Republican
County Clerk	David Woody	Republican
Collector	Michelle M. Wells	Republican
Commissioner (presiding)	Patrick Clark Sr.	Republican
Commissioner (district 1)	Tyler Walock	Republican
Commissioner (district 2)	Richard Riddell	Republican
Coroner	Lee Hanks	Republican
Prosecuting Attorney	Brandi McClain	Republican
Public Administrator	Deanna Utz	Republican
Recorder	Misty Dean	Republican
Sheriff	A.J. Carrel	Republican
Treasurer	Rita Terwilleger	Republican

=== State ===
Past Gubernatorial Elections Results
Year	Republican	Democratic	Third Parties
2024	71.67% 7,921	26.00% 2,874	2.33% 277
2020	69.46% 7,518	27.73% 3,001	2.82% 305
2016	58.97% 6,030	37.76% 3,861	3.27% 334
2012	45.45% 4,461	50.97% 5,003	3.58% 351
2008	40.51% 4,199	57.00% 5,909	2.49% 258
2004	49.06% 4,663	49.51% 4,705	1.43% 136
2000	46.71% 3,943	51.10% 4,313	2.19% 185
1996	29.96% 2,142	67.87% 4,852	2.17% 155

Clinton County is split into two Missouri House of Representatives District numbers 8 & 9. This change occurred after the mandatory redistricting caused by the 2020 census.

Missouri House of Representatives — District 8 — Clinton County (2016)
Party	Candidate	Votes	%	±%
Republican	James W. (Jim) Neely	8,665	100.00%	+30.97

Missouri House of Representatives — District 8 — Clinton County (2014)
Party	Candidate	Votes	%	±%
Republican	James W. (Jim) Neely	3,824	69.03%	+7.58
Democratic	Ted Rights	1,716	30.97%	−7.58

Missouri House of Representatives — District 8 — Clinton County (2012)
Party	Candidate	Votes	%	±%
Republican	James W. (Jim) Neely	5.905	61.45%	
Democratic	James T. (Jim) Crenshaw	3,705	38.55%	

All of Clinton County is a part of Missouri's 12th District in the Missouri Senate and is currently represented by Rusty Black (R-Chillicothe, MO).

Missouri Senate — District 12 — Clinton County (2014)
Party	Candidate	Votes	%	±%
Republican	Dan Hegeman	4,430	100.00%	

=== Federal ===
U.S. Senate — Missouri — Clinton County (2016)
Party	Candidate	Votes	%	±%
Republican	Roy Blunt	5,614	54.91%	+12.60
Democratic	Jason Kander	3,990	39.03%	−9.77
Libertarian	Jonathan Dine	331	3.24%	−5.65
Green	Johnatan McFarland	142	1.39%	+1.39
Constitution	Fred Ryman	146	1.43%	+1.43

U.S. Senate — Missouri — Clinton County (2012)
Party	Candidate	Votes	%	±%
Republican	Todd Akin	4,142	42.31%	
Democratic	Claire McCaskill	4,777	48.80%	
Libertarian	Jonathan Dine	870	8.89%	

All of Clinton County is included in Missouri's 6th Congressional District and is currently represented by Sam Graves (R-Tarkio) in the U.S. House of Representatives.

U.S. House of Representatives — Missouri's 6th Congressional District — Clinton County (2016)
Party	Candidate	Votes	%	±%
Republican	Sam Graves	6,997	69.41%	+6.32
Democratic	David M. Blackwell	2,620	25.99%	−6.08
Libertarian	Russ Lee Monchil	315	3.12%	−1.72
Green	Mike Diel	149	1.48%	+1.48

U.S. House of Representatives — Missouri's 6th Congressional District — Clinton County (2014)
Party	Candidate	Votes	%	±%
Republican	Sam Graves	3,529	63.09%	−0.83
Democratic	Bill Hedge	1,794	32.07%	−1.13
Libertarian	Russ Lee Monchil	271	4.84%	+1.96

U.S. House of Representatives — Missouri’s 6th Congressional District — Clinton County (2012)
Party	Candidate	Votes	%	±%
Republican	Sam Graves	6,198	63.92%	
Democratic	Kyle Yarber	3,219	33.20%	
Libertarian	Russ Lee Monchil	279	2.88%	

United States presidential election results for Clinton County, Missouri
Year	Republican		Democratic		Third party(ies)	
Year	No.	%	No.	%	No.	%
1888	1,632	41.21%	2,167	54.72%	161	4.07%
1892	1,503	38.81%	2,131	55.02%	239	6.17%
1896	1,792	40.33%	2,610	58.74%	41	0.92%
1900	1,745	41.11%	2,405	56.65%	95	2.24%
1904	1,759	47.20%	1,886	50.60%	82	2.20%
1908	1,578	42.90%	2,075	56.42%	25	0.68%
1912	777	22.28%	1,968	56.42%	743	21.30%
1916	1,551	41.10%	2,153	57.05%	70	1.85%
1920	3,165	48.59%	3,304	50.72%	45	0.69%
1924	2,848	46.22%	3,177	51.56%	137	2.22%
1928	3,736	59.98%	2,485	39.89%	8	0.13%
1932	1,805	30.77%	4,042	68.89%	20	0.34%
1936	2,512	37.34%	4,166	61.93%	49	0.73%
1940	3,030	44.25%	3,800	55.50%	17	0.25%
1944	2,912	48.57%	3,079	51.35%	5	0.08%
1948	2,227	38.97%	3,481	60.91%	7	0.12%
1952	3,685	54.66%	3,048	45.21%	9	0.13%
1956	3,026	50.42%	2,976	49.58%	0	0.00%
1960	3,391	51.71%	3,167	48.29%	0	0.00%
1964	1,800	33.35%	3,598	66.65%	0	0.00%
1968	2,659	45.82%	2,525	43.51%	619	10.67%
1972	3,924	66.87%	1,944	33.13%	0	0.00%
1976	2,807	44.75%	3,424	54.59%	41	0.65%
1980	3,599	52.52%	3,001	43.80%	252	3.68%
1984	4,226	60.34%	2,778	39.66%	0	0.00%
1988	3,282	47.15%	3,653	52.48%	26	0.37%
1992	2,391	29.06%	3,400	41.32%	2,437	29.62%
1996	2,780	38.80%	3,445	48.08%	940	13.12%
2000	4,323	50.67%	3,994	46.82%	214	2.51%
2004	5,287	55.42%	4,165	43.66%	88	0.92%
2008	5,709	54.61%	4,545	43.48%	200	1.91%
2012	5,931	60.15%	3,688	37.40%	242	2.45%
2016	7,067	68.60%	2,572	24.97%	662	6.43%
2020	7,799	71.63%	2,896	26.60%	193	1.77%
2024	8,235	73.33%	2,855	25.42%	140	1.25%
