= Waddell "A" Truss Bridge (Parkville, Missouri) =

Bridge in Missouri, U.S.

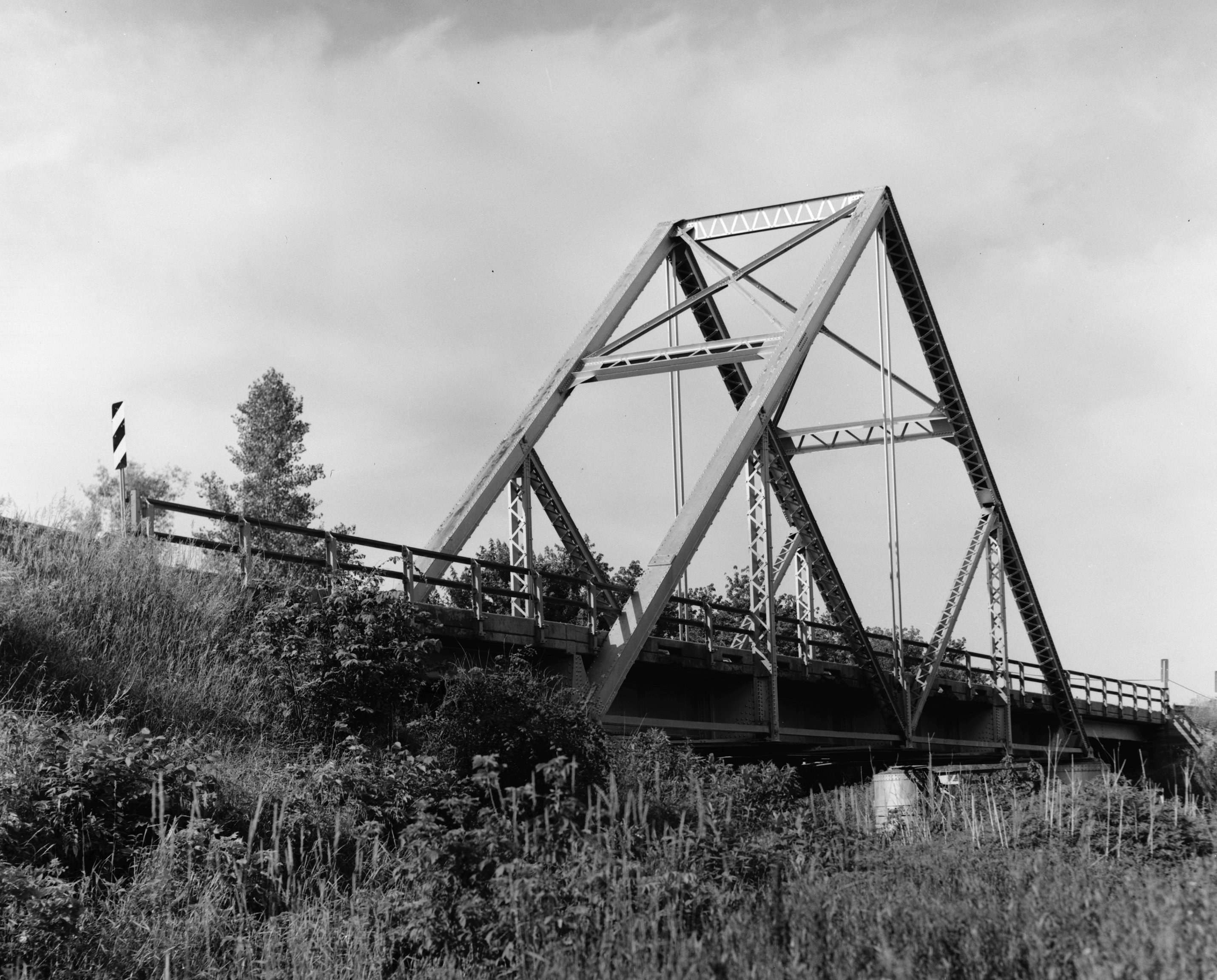
- Coordinates: 39°11′10″N 94°40′55″W
- Carries: Pedestrian path (Formerly railroad)
- Crosses: Rush Creek
- Locale: Parkville, MO
- Other name: Linn Branch Creek Bridge
- Named for: John Alexander Waddell

Characteristics
- Design: Truss
- Material: Steel
- Total length: 100 ft (30 m)
- Width: 14 ft (4.3 m)
- Height: 40 ft (12 m)

History
- Designer: J.A.L. Waddell, Consulting Engineer
- Constructed by: Pencoyd Iron Works
- Opened: 1898
- Waddell "A" Truss Bridge
- U.S. National Register of Historic Places
- Built: 1898
- Architectural style: Waddell "A" Truss Bridge
- Restored: November 21, 1987
- Restored by: University of Missouri at Kansas City
- NRHP reference No.: 90002173
- Added to NRHP: January 25, 1991

Location
- Interactive map of Waddell "A" Truss Bridge

The Waddell "A" Truss Bridge, also known by its original name of Linn Branch Creek Bridge, is one of two surviving examples of the "A" Truss Bridge type originated by John Alexander Low Waddell. It was originally completed in 1898 near Trimble, Missouri, and is currently located at English Landing Park in Parkville, Platte County, Missouri. The bridge was relocated in 1987 and listed on the National Register of Historic Places in 1991.

== History ==
Originally spanning Linn Branch Creek on the eastern outskirts of Trimble, Missouri, the bridge was built from U.S. patent 529,220, which was an early standardized design of the famed engineer J.A.L. Waddell. It carried a single-tracked segment of the Quincy, Omaha, and Kansas City Railroad between Plattsburg and Trimble. The structure was fabricated by the Pencoyd Iron Works of Philadelphia, and it operated in railroad configuration for over 40 years until the line was abandoned in 1939.

In 1953, the Missouri Highway Department renovated the bridge deck to roadway and repurposed the rail line for Missouri State Route 4. By 1972, construction on the future Smithville Lake had begun, rendering the road defunct and threatening the bridge's future. Shortly before the reservoir was impounded in 1979, the bridge was determined eligible to be listed among the National Register of Historic Places. It was catalogued by the Historic American Engineering Record (HAER) before being marked, disassembled, and stored by United States Army Corps of Engineers in 1980.

The bridge was restored and reassembled at its current location, English Landing Park, in 1987 at a cost of $1,500. The restoration was a volunteer effort led by civil engineering professor George F. W. Hauck of the University of Missouri–Kansas City, with the assistance of students and industry professionals. The project won the "Outstanding Civil Engineering Award of Merit" from the American Society of Civil Engineers (ASCE) in 1989, and was listed on the National Register of Historic Places in 1990.

The other surviving Waddell "A" Truss bridge spans the Cross Bayou in Shreveport, Louisiana. Now abandoned, the bridge once carried the Kansas City Southern Railway across the bayou. It has been listed on the National Register as Kansas City Southern Railroad Bridge, Cross Bayou, and is recognized as a historic site by the City of Shreveport.

== See also ==
- List of bridges documented by the Historic American Engineering Record in Missouri
