= Hardesty & Hanover =

Transportation engineering company in New York City

H&H
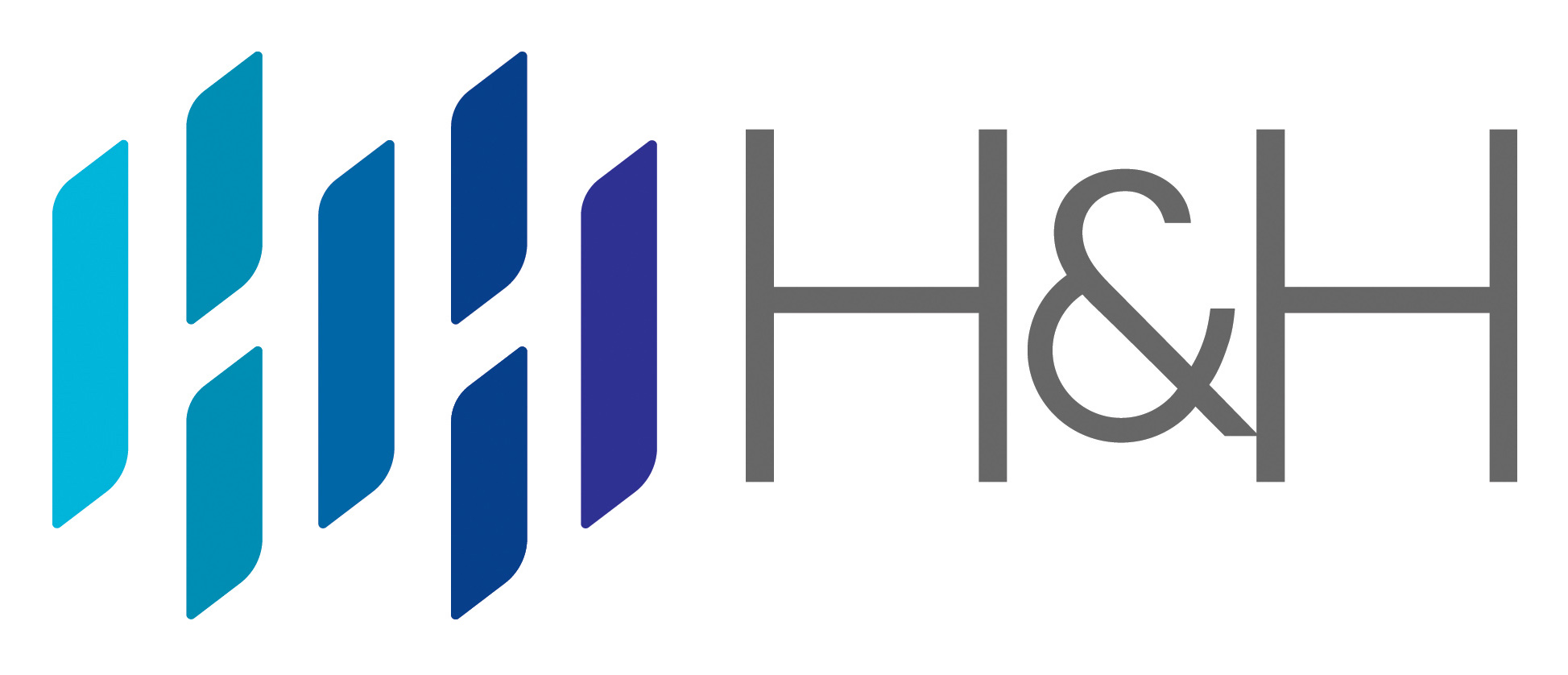
- Formerly: Hardesty & Hanover; Waddell & Hardesty; Waddell & Son; Waddell & Harrington; Waddell & Hedrick; J.A.L. Waddell, Consulting Engineer
- Company type: Privately held company
- Industry: Infrastructure engineering
- Founded: 1887; 138 years ago in Kansas City, Missouri
- Founder: John Alexander Low Waddell
- Headquarters: New York City, United States
- Key people: CEO Sean A. Bluni, PE
- Services: Design & Engineering; Program Management; Planning
- Website: hardestyhanover.com

H&H is an American infrastructure engineering company specializing in the design and management of bridges and other transportation and architecture projects. The firm was founded in 1887 by John Alexander Low Waddell, a structural engineer who pioneered the design of large-scale moveable bridge. Originally incorporated in Kansas City, Missouri as J.A.L. Waddell, Consulting Engineer, the company was renamed throughout the early 20th century as Waddell added junior partners to the organization. In 1920, the firm moved its headquarters to New York City, where it would go on to design many important bridges in the area, such as Newark Bay Bridge (rail), the original Goethals Bridge, and Marine Parkway Bridge.

In recent decades the company has expanded its footprint to the fields of highway design and movable architecture, contributing to projects like U.S. Bank Stadium, the New York City Shed, the redevelopment of LaGuardia Airport, and other major interchanges of highways in New York City.

== History ==
=== J.A.L. Waddell, Consulting Engineer (1887) ===
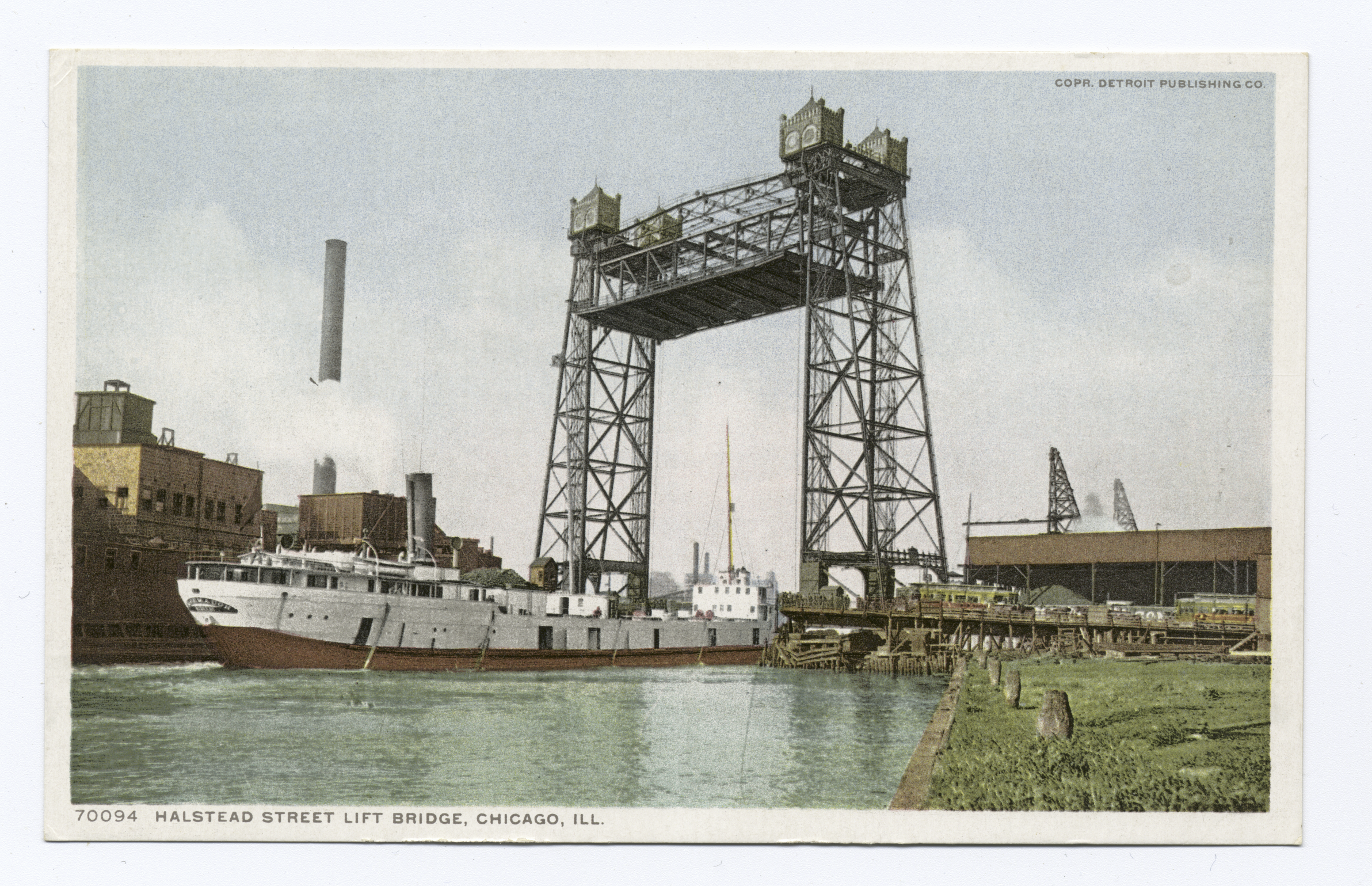
South Halsted Street Bridge, Chicago, IL

Waddell's private consultancy gained a reputation for "daring and unusual structures" with a modern approach to the bridge design, and construction process. The company's first project, the Illinois Central Missouri River Bridge, was a swing bridge designed by Waddell in 1893 and built across the Missouri River. At the time of its construction, it was the longest swing bridge in the world with a moving span of 520 ft (158.5 m).

A year later in 1894, Waddell designed the South Halsted Street Bridge over the Chicago River. As the world's first major vertical-lift bridge, the project had a significant impact on infrastructure design.

=== Waddell and Hedrick, Consulting Engineers (1899) ===
In 1899 Waddell promoted his chief draftsman Ira G. Hedrick to partner, renaming the firm Waddell & Hedrick. This partnership produced what would become the company's oldest design still in operation as of 2021: the New Westminster Bridge.

=== Waddell and Harrington (1907) ===
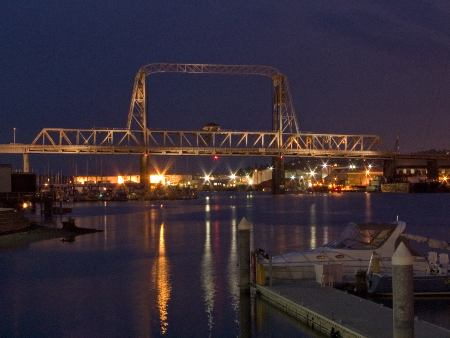
Murray Morgan Bridge, Tacoma

In 1907 the company became known as Waddell & Harrington when Waddell partnered with John L. Harrington, former Chief Engineer of the Locomotive & Machine Company of Montreal. While still headquartered in Kansas City, the firm also maintained offices in Portland, Oregon, and Vancouver, British Columbia.

In 1908 Waddell & Harrington patented an improved Bascule bridge. That summer they also filed the first of several patents for improvements to Waddell's earlier vertical-lift bridge designs,

In their time together, Waddell & Harrington designed at least thirty highway and railroad bridges, and four remain in operation as of 2021 (three of them in the iconic vertical-lift style): Hawthorne Bridge (1910), ASB Bridge (1911), Colorado St. (Arroyo Seco) Bridge (1913), and Murray Morgan Bridge (1913).

In 1914, Waddell & Harrington announced the dissolution of their partnership effective in July of the following year. Harrington would continue working with his colleague, draftsman Frank Cortelyou, in new firm known as Harrington, Howard & Ash (which would eventually become HNTB).

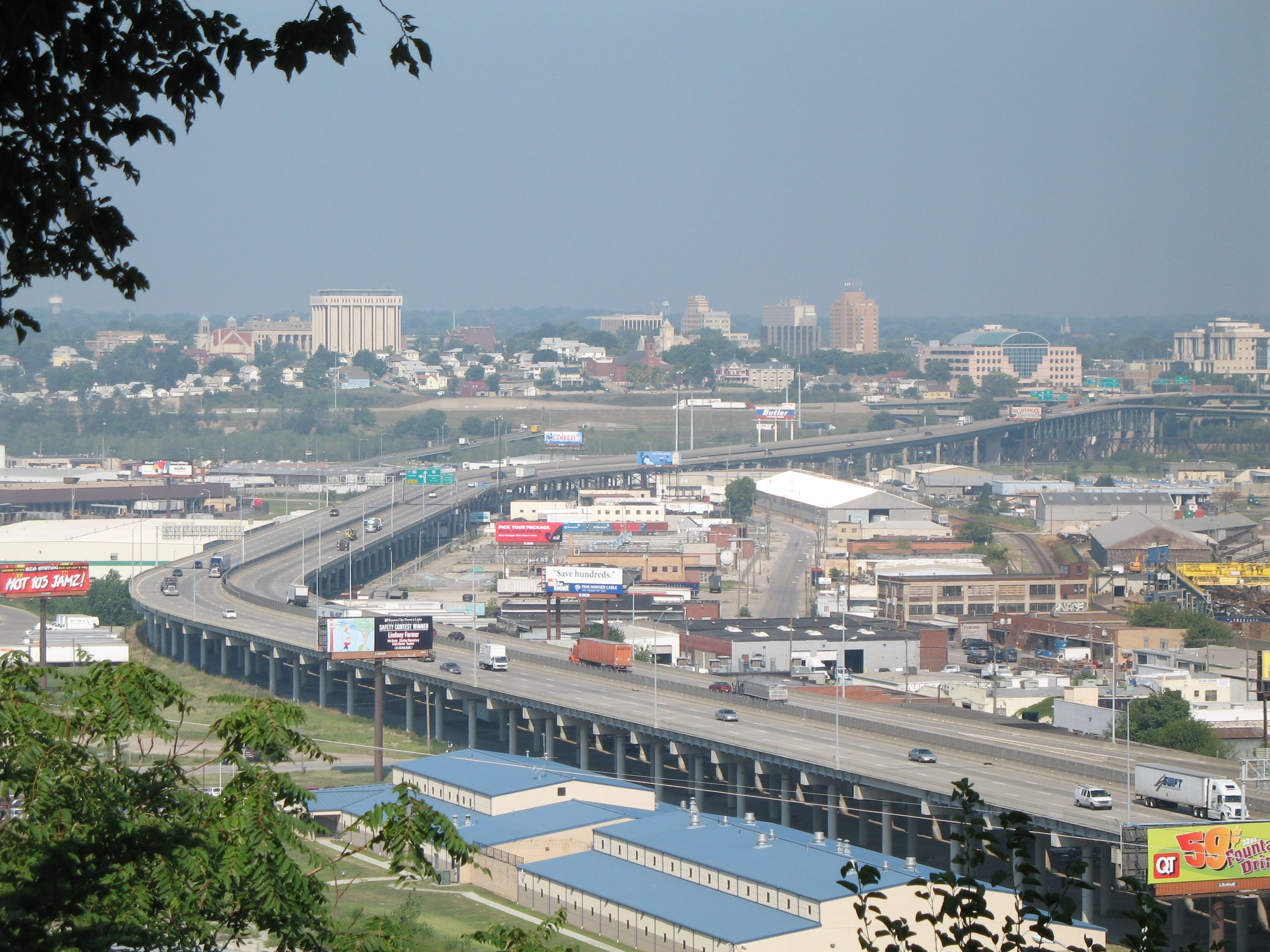
Intercity Viaduct, of which the one on the right was designed by the firm

=== Waddell and Son (1915) ===
In 1915, Waddell promoted Needham Everett to junior partner, renaming the firm Waddell & Son. That same year, they celebrated the opening of the LS&MS Railway Bridge No. 6 in Chicago, IL, and a satellite office in New York City, though the younger Waddell reportedly stayed behind to manage the Kansas City office through at least 1918. In 1916, Shortridge Hardesty (who had previously been hand-picked to join the firm shortly after his 1908 graduation from Rensselaer Polytechnic Institute) was promoted to Designing Engineer.

The firm did well, receiving many contracts during the post-war economic revival, and the New York office became its headquarters in 1920.

Needham Everett died in 1927.

=== Waddell and Hardesty (1927) ===
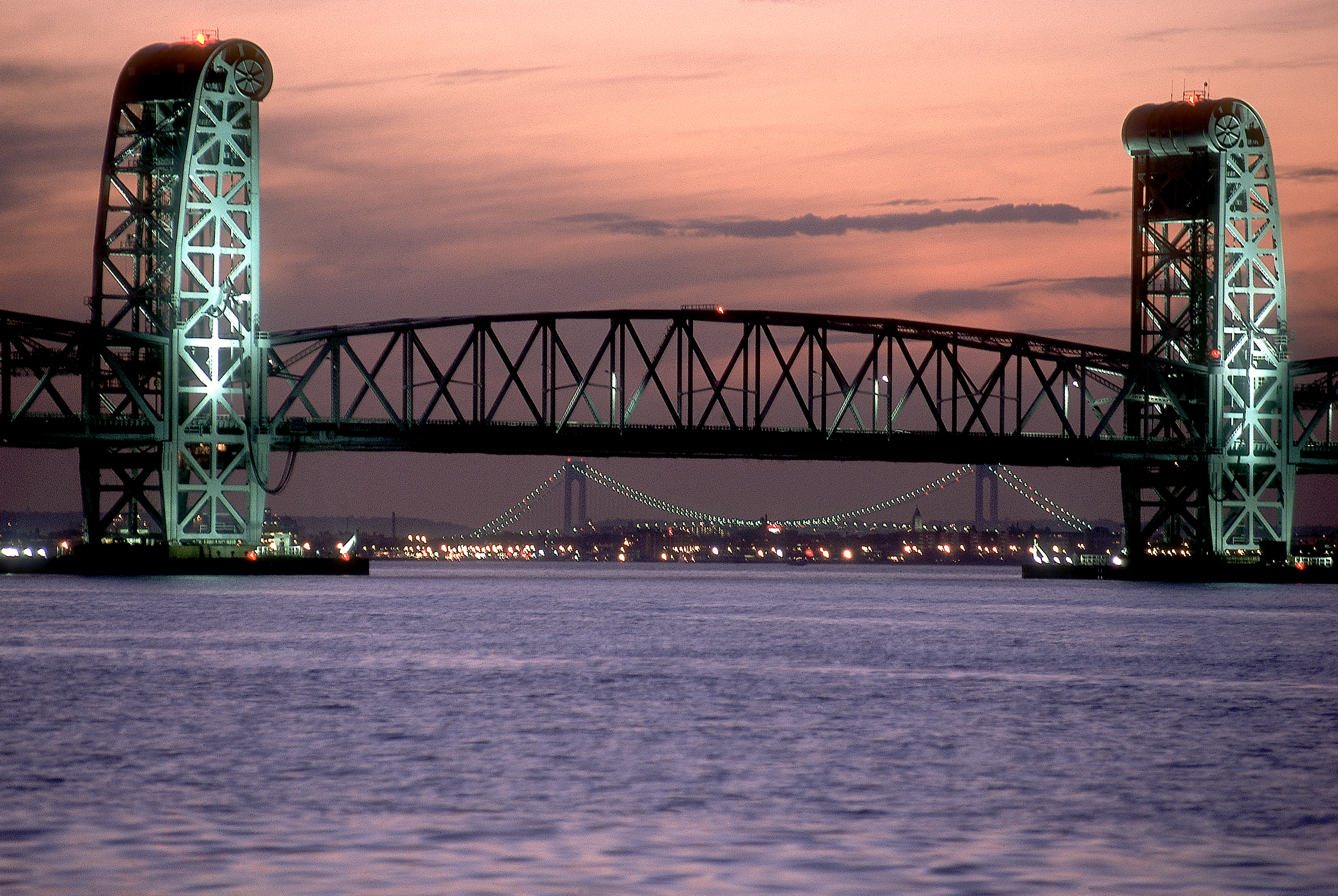
Marine Parkway Bridge, New York City

After the death of his son, Waddell continued to lead the firm, promoting Hardesty to Partner. They continued to create important bridges; the CRRNJ Newark Bay Bridge (1926), original Goethals Bridge and Outerbridge Crossing (1928), and Marine Parkway Bridge (1937). In 1931 Waddell was personally honored with the American Association of Engineers' Clausen Gold Medal award for "distinguished service to the engineering profession", and again in 1937 with the American Society of Civil Engineers (ASCE) Norman Medal. He died in 1938 at the age of 84, leaving Hardesty to run the company.

=== Hardesty & Hanover (1945) ===
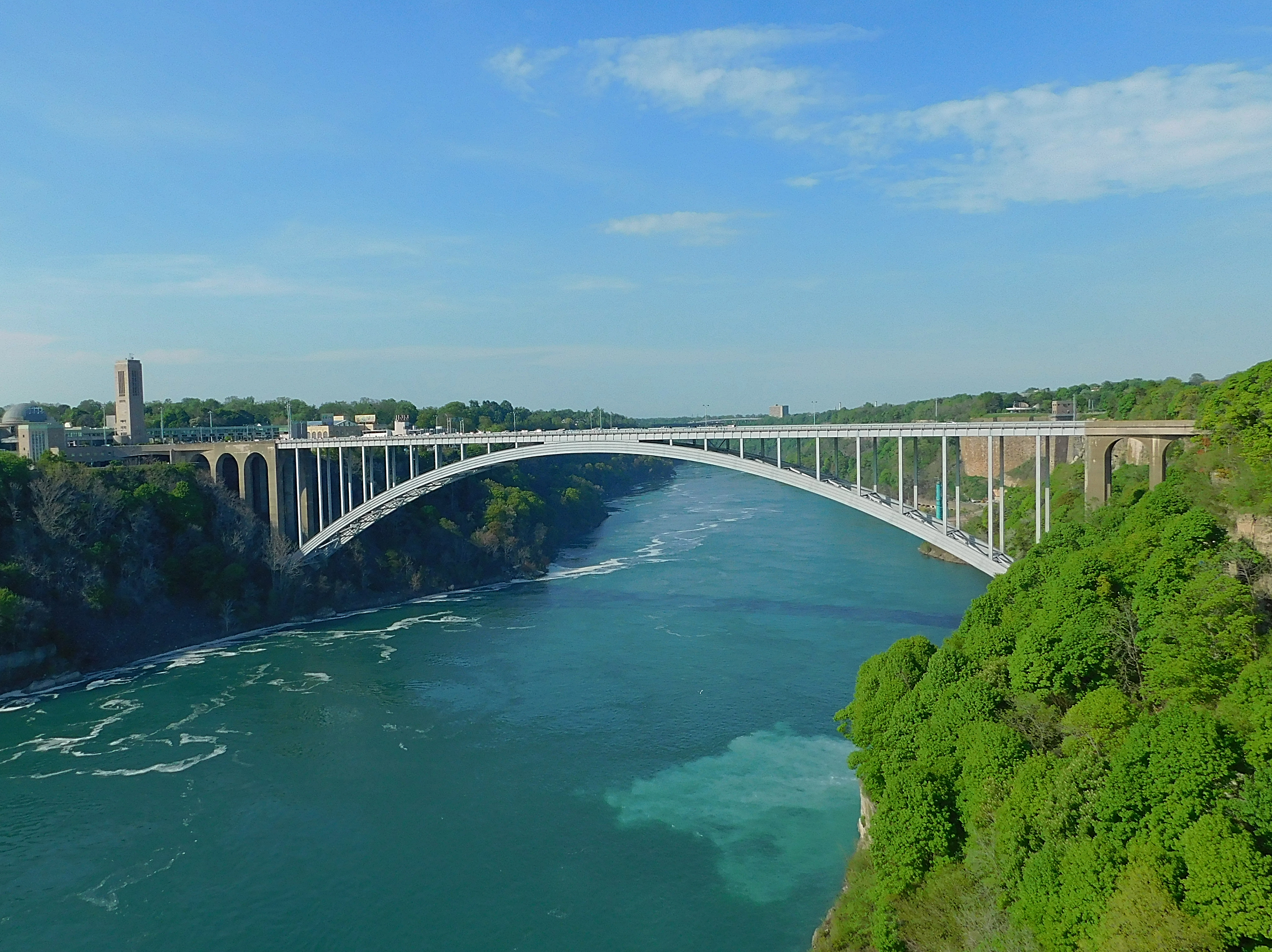
Rainbow Bridge, Niagara Falls

In 1945, Hardesty took on Clinton Hanover (former Chief of the New York City Bureau of Bridge Design) as a partner. The duo's leadership saw completion of the Rainbow Bridge in 1941. Spanning Niagara Falls, the structure was honored with the 1941 American Institute of Steel Construction (AISC) 1st Place "Class A" Prize Bridge Award for beauty.

In the following decades, the company developed many other moveable and fixed bridges across New York State and beyond. One of its earliest forays into moveable architecture was an amusement ride for the 1964 New York World's Fair that took the form of a Ferris wheel, known as the Uniroyal Giant Tire.

Among H&H's first highway projects was the Interstate 80 and Route 19 interchange in Paterson, New Jersey. The company has continued to design roadways, most recently the reconstruction of LaGuardia Airport and Kew Gardens Interchange. The latter project features NEXT Beam technology in one of its 15 bridges. The firm also designed the replacement William Cullen Bryant Viaduct between Flower Hill & Roslyn, New York.

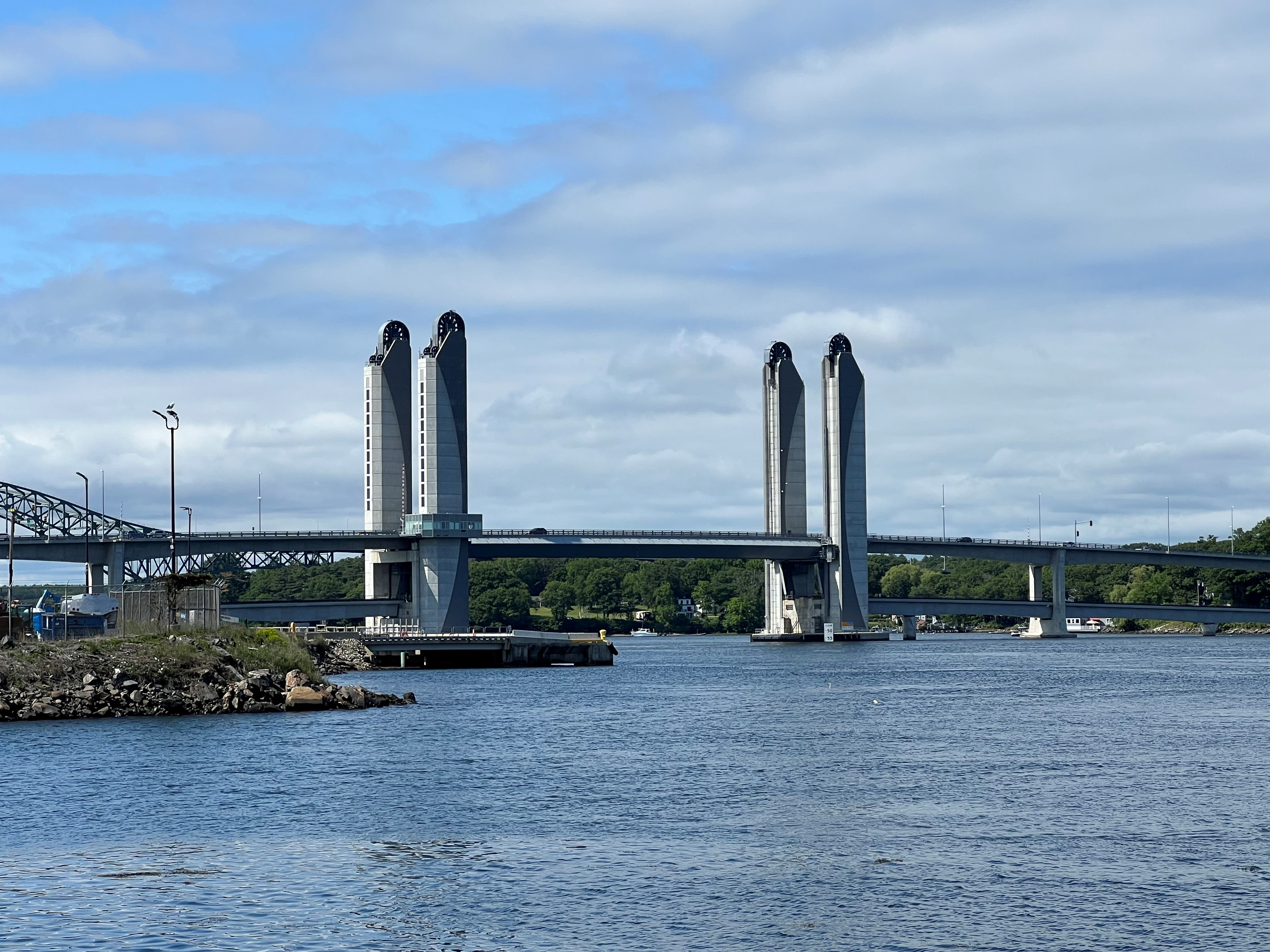
2018 Sarah Mildred Long Bridge

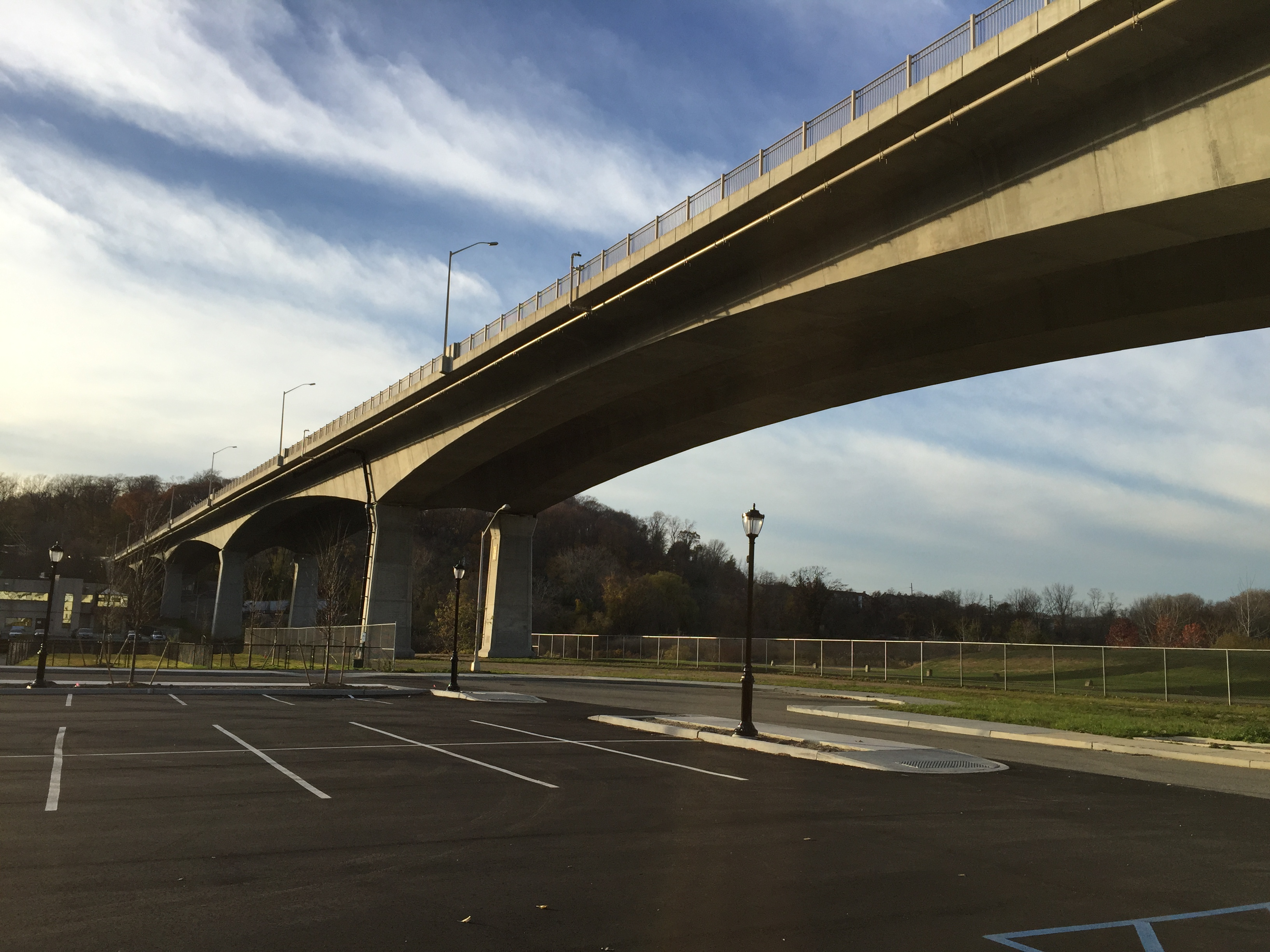
William Cullen Bryant Viaduct, Flower Hill–Roslyn, NY

In 2022, Hardesty & Hanover unveiled a new corporate brand & logo that complements recent company growth. Going forward, branding will identify the firm as H&H, with Hardesty & Hanover, LLC remaining the legal name. In 2022, the firm also received notification from the United States Patent and Trademark Office that the firm had been awarded a trademark designation for the key phrase “Designed to Amaze, Engineered to Last®” which had been used across the firm for more than four years. While the firm and its employees have multiple patents, this is the first trademark awarded to H&H. With 600 employees, the firm has 33 offices in the US and the UK.

== Notable projects ==
Bridges
Year	Name	Locale	Status	Crossing	Notes
1890	Atlantic & Pacific Railroad Bridge	Needles, CA	Demolished	Colorado River	Replaced 1948
1893	Illinois Central Missouri River Bridge	Council Bluffs, IA & Omaha, NE	Abandoned	Missouri River	
1894	South Halstead Street Bridge	Chicago, IL	Demolished	Chicago River	Replaced 1934
1898	Waddell "A" Truss Bridge (patent)	Multiple	Extant		Two examples surviving
1904	New Westminster Bridge	New Westminster, BC	In Use	Fraser River	
1907	Lewis and Clark Viaduct	Kansas City, Kansas–Kansas City, Missouri	In use (Extensively altered)	Kansas River, West Bottoms, railroad tracks	Reconstructed many times; last 1907 built segment over the Kansas River currently in the planning phases of bring replaced
1909	Keithsburg Rail Bridge	Keithsburg, IL	Abandoned	Mississippi River	
1910	Hawthorne Bridge	Portland, OR	In Use	Willamette River	
1911	ASB Bridge	Kansas City, MO	In Use	Missouri River	
1911	Tehama Lift Bridge	Tehama, CA	Demolished	Sacramento River	Replaced 1977
1912	Steel Bridge	Portland, OR	In Use	Willamette River	
1912	Fort Smith-Van Buren Free Bridge			Arkansas River	
1913	Colorado Street Bridge	Pasadena, CA	In Use	Arroyo Seco	
1913	Murray Morgan (City Waterway) Bridge	Tacoma, WA	In Use	Thea Foss Waterway	
1914	South Branch/Canal Street Bridge 458	Chicago, IL	In Use	Chicago River	
1914	Caddo Lake Drawbridge	Mooringsport, LA	In Use	Caddo Lake	
1914	LS&MS Railway Bridge No. 6	Chicago, IL	In Use	Calumet River	
1917	Columbia River Interstate Bridge	Portland, OR	In Use	Columbia River	
1923	Memorial Bridge	Portsmouth, NH	Demolished	Piscataqua River	Replaced 2013
1928	Goethals Bridge (original)	Elizabeth, NJ & Staten Island, NY	Demolished	Arthur Kill	Replaced 2017
1928	Outerbridge Crossing	Perth Amboy, NJ & Staten Island, NY	In Use	Arthur Kill	
1931	Anthony Wayne Bridge	Toledo, OH	In Use	Maumee River	
1935	North Grand Island Bridge	Niagara Falls, NY	In Use	Niagara River	
1937	Marine Parkway Bridge	Queens, NY	In Use	Jamaica Bay	
1940	Mill Basin Bridge	Brooklyn, NY	Demolished	Mill Basin	Replaced 2017
1941	Rainbow Bridge	Niagara Falls, NY & Niagara Falls, ON	In Use	Niagara River	
1952	Atlantic Beach Bridge	Atlantic Beach, NY & Lawrence, NY	In Use	Reynolds Channel	
1962	Lewiston–Queenston Bridge	Lewiston, NY & Queenston, ON	In Use	Niagara River	
1963	Alexander Hamilton Bridge	New York City, NY	In Use	Harlem River	
1968	Robert Moses Causeway (northbound)	Islip, New York	In Use	Great South Bay	
2012	William Cullen Bryant Viaduct (current)	Flower Hill, NY & Roslyn, NY	In use	Hempstead Harbor	
