= English Landing Park =

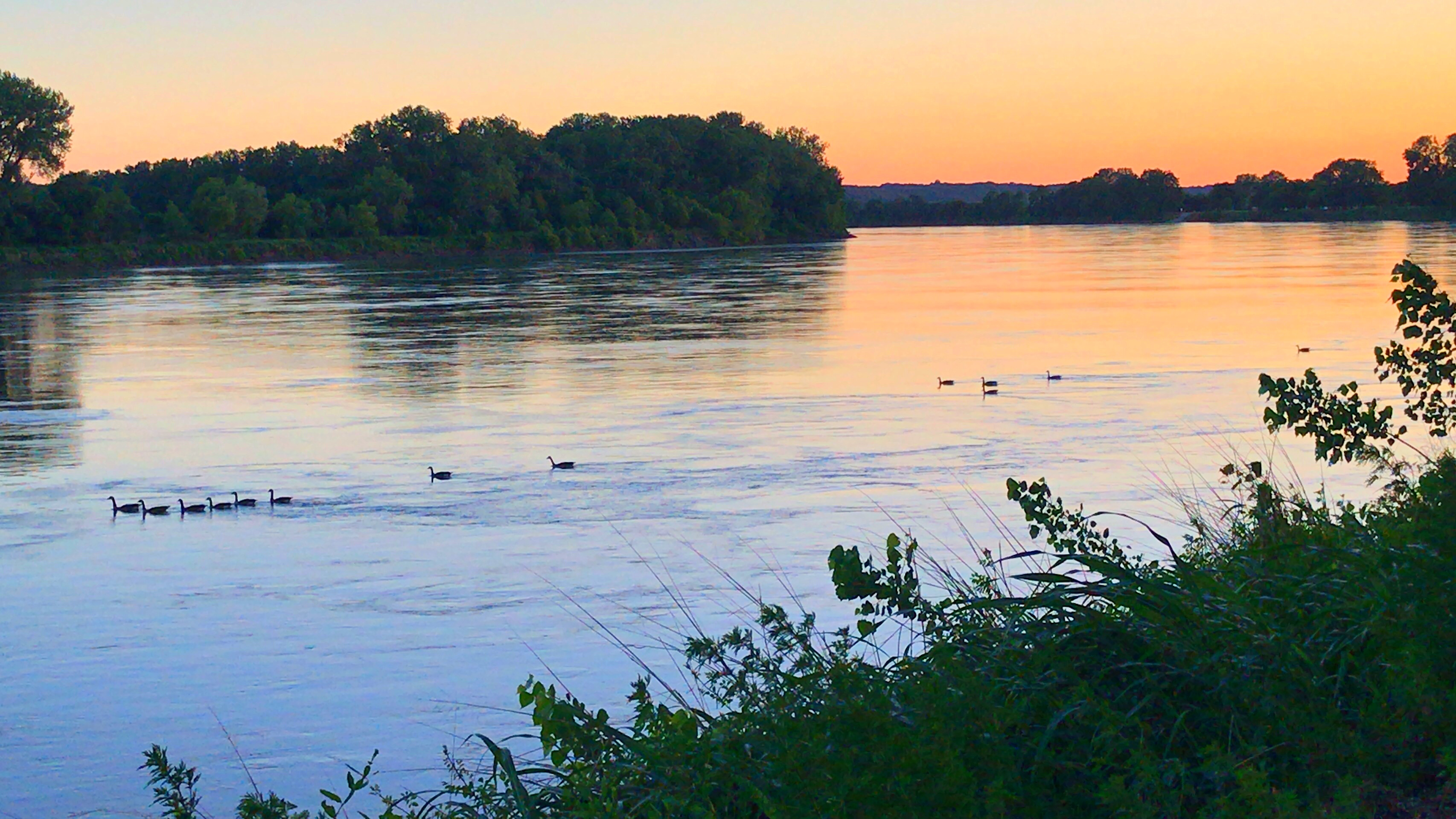
- Canada geese on the Missouri River, English Landing Park, June 2018
- Interactive map of English Landing Park
- Type: City park
- Location: Parkville in Platte County, Missouri, Missouri
- Coordinates: 39.186°N 94.679°W
- Area: 68 acres (28 ha)
- Created: 1987
- Operator: City of Parkville
- Status: Open all year
- Website: English Landing Park

English Landing Park is located along the Missouri river in Parkville, Missouri, United States. The area the park now sits were once just low water areas of the Missouri River. It includes a 3-mile jogging/biking trail that follows the river's edge, several shelters for picnics, a soccer field, a baseball diamond, volleyball courts, 2 playgrounds (one for small kids and one for bigger kids). Recently, a small 9-hole Frisbee golf course has been added around the jogging/biking trail. There is also a busy set of train tracks that runs along the length of the park. The area of present-day English Landing Park was bought from the English Brothers by Colonel George S. Park in 1838, who was a veteran of the Texas war of independence. He purchased a riverboat landing from them as well, and that riverboat landing as well as the present-day park became a civil war port of call for slave trade. The Riverpark Pub and Eatery, which sits right next to the rail road tracks at the entrance to the park, was built in the mid-19th century as a coal-fired twin-boiler power plant that fed the entire city. The city itself was founded by Colonel Park in 1844 and by 1850 he had built warehouses and a large stone hotel. In 1853 he established one of Platte County's earliest newspapers, The Industrial Luminary. Parkville itself did not become a Civil War battlefield, but there was still mass genocide as numerous slaves tried desperately to escape across the river into Kansas for freedom. These slaves were buried in three large but unmarked cemeteries in the present-day Misty Woods subdivision. After the Civil War, the port and the riverboat landing were all but abandoned and the area slowly changed from a bustling port city to what is present-day Parkville.

The park includes the historic Waddell "A" Truss Bridge, built 1898, subject of a patent, which spanned Linn Branch Creek.

== Flooding ==
During the Great Flood of 1993, the park and most of Downtown Parkville were submerged under more than 15 feet of water when the Missouri River overflowed its banks. In Kansas City, the Missouri River crested at 48.9 feet, nearly 7 feet above the flood stage of 32 feet.

On May 4, 2003, English Landing Park narrowly missed the wrath of an EF1 tornado that came across the river behind the fuel storage tanks and cut a swath of damage paralleling the rail road tracks before crossing 9 Highway about 1/2 mile west of Park Hill South high school, then the tornado made a bee-line for Northmoor, Missouri. In May 2007, the Missouri River flooded the entire park with less than 3 feet of water. The river receded approximately a week later. That same year, the Power Plant Restaurant's neglected smokestack had to be torn down, eradicating an icon of the city's past.

On March 17, 2019, The river flooded up over English Landing Park all the way to the train tracks before retreating a few days later. No buildings were damaged due to sandbagging but playground equipment and structures at the dog park were damaged and lost including much of the fence around the park. Also a main bridge that goes over White branch creek collapsed and is being re-built as of April 30, 2019.
