= Ira G. Hedrick =

American civil engineer

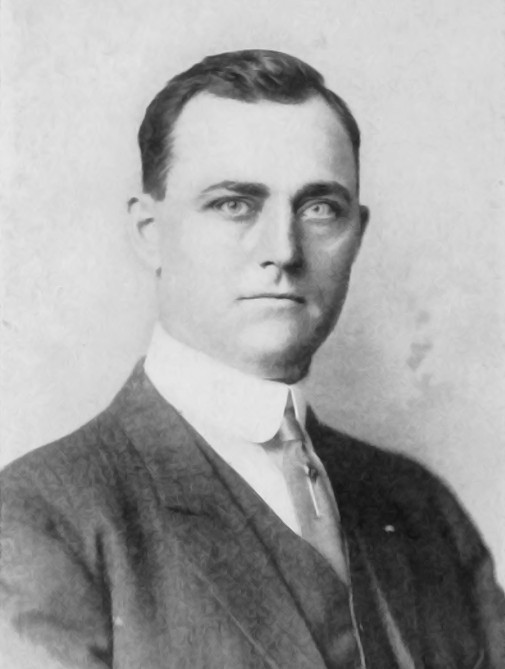
Ira Grant Hedrick

Ira Grant Hedrick (April 6, 1868 – December 28, 1937) was an American civil engineer who designed the Burnside Bridge in Oregon, the Red River Bridge, Clarendon, and Newport bridges in Arkansas, and many other bridges and viaducts. Hedrick designed many large scale bridges in Arkansas in late 1920s through early 1930s. Hedrick was also president of the Kansas City Viaduct and Terminal Railway Company. The Historic American Engineering Record says that he was "one of the outstanding engineers of the South".

Hedrick was a member of the American Society of Civil Engineers.

In 1899, Hedrick was promoted by J.A.L. Waddell from Chief Draftsman to Partner of the firm Waddell & Hedrick, where he assisted in the design of Canada's New Westminster Bridge (opened 1904).

== Life and career ==
Hedrick was born in West Salem, Illinois. He received his B.S. in civil engineering University of Arkansas at Fayetteville in 1892. He received another bachelor's degree from the university in 1899 in Applied Science and M.S. degree in 1901. He earned his D.Sc. degree from McGill University in 1905.
