= Kansas City Southern Railroad Bridge, Cross Bayou =

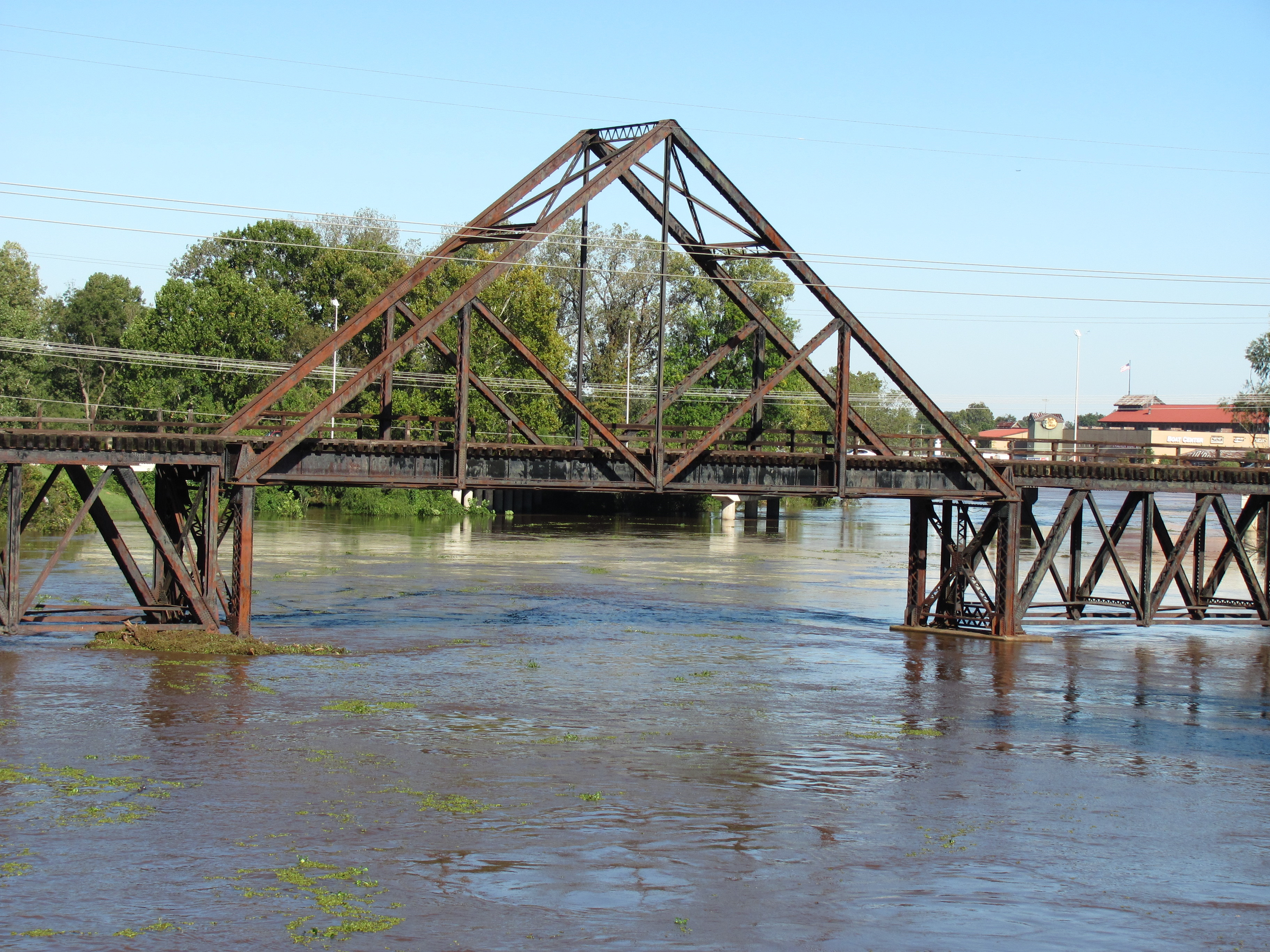
- Looking east from North Spring Street road bridge.
- Coordinates: 32°31′08″N 93°45′00″W
- Carries: Railroad (defunct)
- Crosses: Cross Bayou
- Locale: Shreveport, LA
- Owner: City of Shreveport

Characteristics
- Design: Truss
- Material: Steel
- Total length: 354 ft (108 m)
- Width: 14 ft (4.3 m)
- Height: 40 ft (12 m) (central A-frame)
- No. of spans: 3
- Piers in water: 2

History
- Designer: J.A.L. Waddell, Consulting Engineer
- Opened: 1926; 1890s (original location)
- Kansas City Southern Railroad Bridge, Cross Bayou
- U.S. National Register of Historic Places
- Location: Over Cross Bayou, between North Spring Street bridge and Clyde Fant Memorial Parkway bridge, Shreveport, Louisiana
- Built: Mid-1890s
- Architectural style: Waddell "A" Truss Bridge
- NRHP reference No.: 90002173
- Added to NRHP: March 23, 1995

Location
- Interactive map of Kansas City Southern Railroad Bridge, Cross Bayou

The Kansas City Southern Railroad Bridge (Cross Bayou), in downtown Shreveport, Louisiana, is an "A" Truss bridge erected in its current location in 1926 and abandoned in the 1980s. Due to its national significance to the progress of American bridge design, and its rarity as one of only two known surviving examples, the structure was designated a National Historic Place in 1995.

== History ==
The "A" frame truss design of the central span is based on an 1894 patent by John Alexander Low Waddell, which was replicated multiple times throughout the Kansas City, Pittsburg and Gulf and St. Louis Southwestern railroads. It also became the standard design for 65 to 116 ft (19.8 to 35.4 m) crossings along the Nippon Railway in Japan.

According to the Louisiana Division of Historic Preservation, the structure is the oldest known bridge in Louisiana and was originally erected in the mid-to-late 1890s at an unknown location over the Arkansas River in Oklahoma. In 1926, it was moved to its current location spanning Cross Bayou (Twelve Mile Bayou) in downtown Shreveport, about 100 yards (91 m) east of the neighboring Spring Street crossing. After relocation, the crossing carried the Kansas City Southern Railway. While the line was reportedly abandoned in the late 1980s, the original single track remains in place. Connections to the Union Pacific's existing trackage at Spring Street have been removed. In the early 1990s, the railroad donated the bridge to the City of Shreveport, and it was added to the National Register of Historic Places in 1995.

In 2017, the Shreveport Downtown Development Authority initiated a survey of the bridge, citing potential future redevelopment of the site as a greenway due to its proximity to Clyde Fant Parkway along the Red River.

The other remaining Waddell "A" Truss Bridge, also listed on the National Register, was built in Missouri in 1898.

== See also ==
- National Register of Historic Places listings in Caddo Parish, Louisiana
- List of bridges on the National Register of Historic Places in Louisiana
