= John L. Harrington =

American civil engineer (1868–1942)

John Lyle Harrington
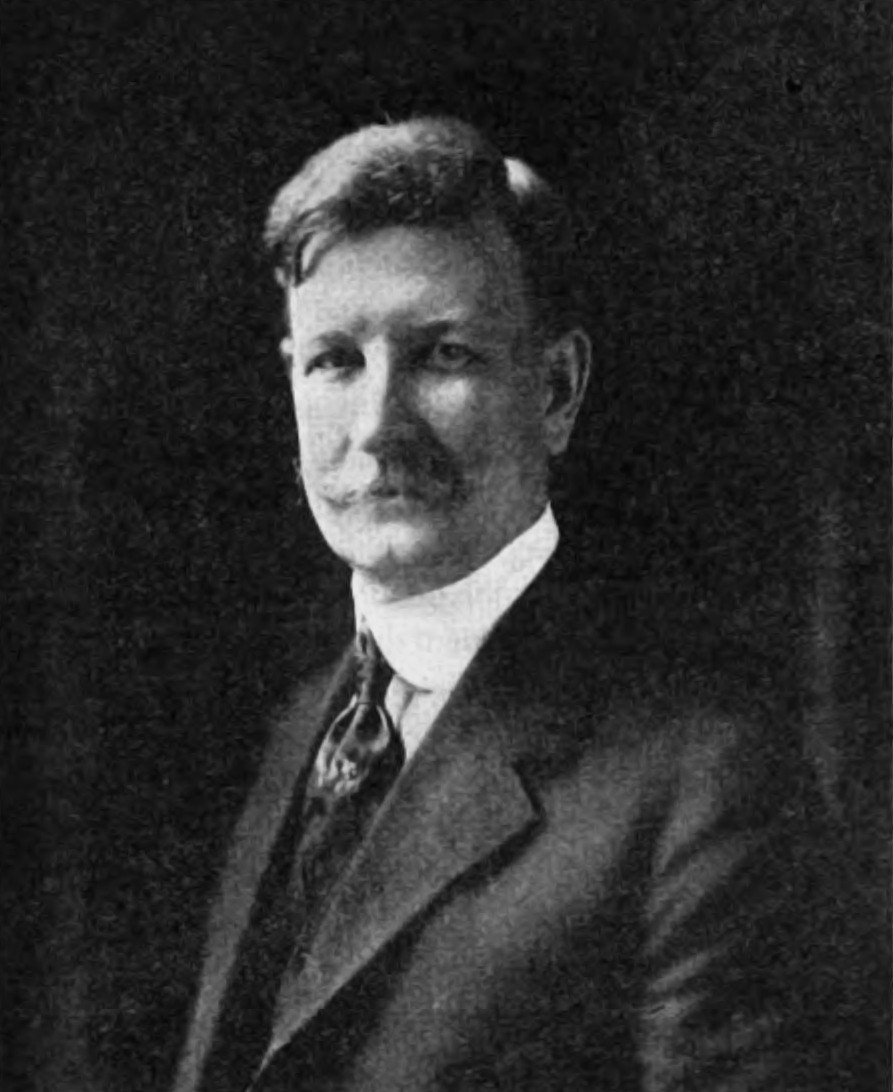
- John L. Harrington in 1922
- Born: December 7, 1868; Lawrence, Kansas, U.S.
- Died: May 20, 1942 (aged 73); Kansas City, Missouri, U.S.
- Resting place: Forest Hill Calvary Cemetery; Kansas City, Missouri, U.S.
- Education: C.E., M.S., D.Eng.
- Alma mater: University of Kansas; McGill University; Case School of Applied Science
- Organization(s): American Society of Mechanical Engineers; Reconstruction Finance Corporation
- Spouse: Daisy June Orton (m. 1899)
- Children: 1
- Engineering career
- Discipline: Civil Engineering
- Practice name: Waddell & Harrington; Harrington, Howard, & Ash; Harrington & Cortelyou
- Significant design: Vertical-lift bridge

John Lyle Harrington (December 7, 1868 – May 20, 1942) was an American civil engineer and a leading expert in the field of moveable bridge design. He was a senior partner in several bridge engineering firms, President of the American Society of Mechanical Engineers in 1923-24, and Chief of the engineers' board advising the Reconstruction Finance Corporation.

== Early life and family ==
John L. Harrington was born on December 7, 1868, in Lawrence, Kansas to Robert Charles and Angeline Virginia (née Henry). He attended public schooling in Kansas before graduating from the University of Kansas in 1895 with a Bachelor of Science (BS) in civil engineering. In 1899 he married Daisy June Orton of White Cloud, Kansas before continuing his education at McGill University, where he completed a second BS in 1906, and a Master of Science (MS) degree in 1908. As of 1911, Harrington and his wife resided in Kansas City, Missouri with one child: Thomas Orton Harrington. Eventually, Harrington earned a Doctorate of Engineering from the Case School of Applied Sciences in 1930.

== Career and works ==
Early in his career, Harrington was Chief Engineer of the Locomotive and Machine Company of Montreal. In 1907 he would partner with John Alexander Low Waddell to form the bridge design firm Waddell & Harrington. Working together, they would soon obtain several patents improving on Waddell's earlier designs of the state-of-the-art vertical-lift bridge. As of 2021, one of Harrington's early bridge collaborations with Waddell, the 1910 Hawthorne Bridge in Portland, Oregon, remains the oldest operating vertical-lift bridge in the United States. The partnership came to an end in 1914 when Harrington departed along with draftsman Frank Morgan Cortelyou. They joined a new company called 'Harrington, Howard & Ash', and in 1928 the duo went on to found the long-running firm Harrington & Cortelyou.

In 1922 Harrington was elected president of the American Society of Mechanical Engineers for the year 1923-24. Under the Herbert Hoover presidency (1929–1933), he was a member of the Reconstruction Finance Corporation.

By the end of his career, Harrington was credited with having designed over 200 bridges and $100,000,000 worth of infrastructure (as of 1930). Some of Harrington's notable creations include:

- Hawthorne Bridge (1910)
- ASB Bridge (1911)
- Colorado St. (Arroyo Seco) Bridge (1913)
- Murray Morgan Bridge (1913)
- Champ Clark Bridge (1928)
- Sarah Mildred Long Bridge (1940)

== Death ==
John Harrington died on May 20, 1942, in Kansas City. He is buried at Forest Hill Calvary Cemetery.

== Selected publications ==
- Harrington, John Lyle (ed.). The principal professional papers of Dr. J.A.L.Waddell, civil engineer, 1905.
- John Alexander Low Waddell & John Lyle Harrington. Addresses to Engineering Students. Waddell & Harrington, 1911.
