= Lake Shore and Michigan Southern Railway, Bridge No. 6 =

Railway bridge

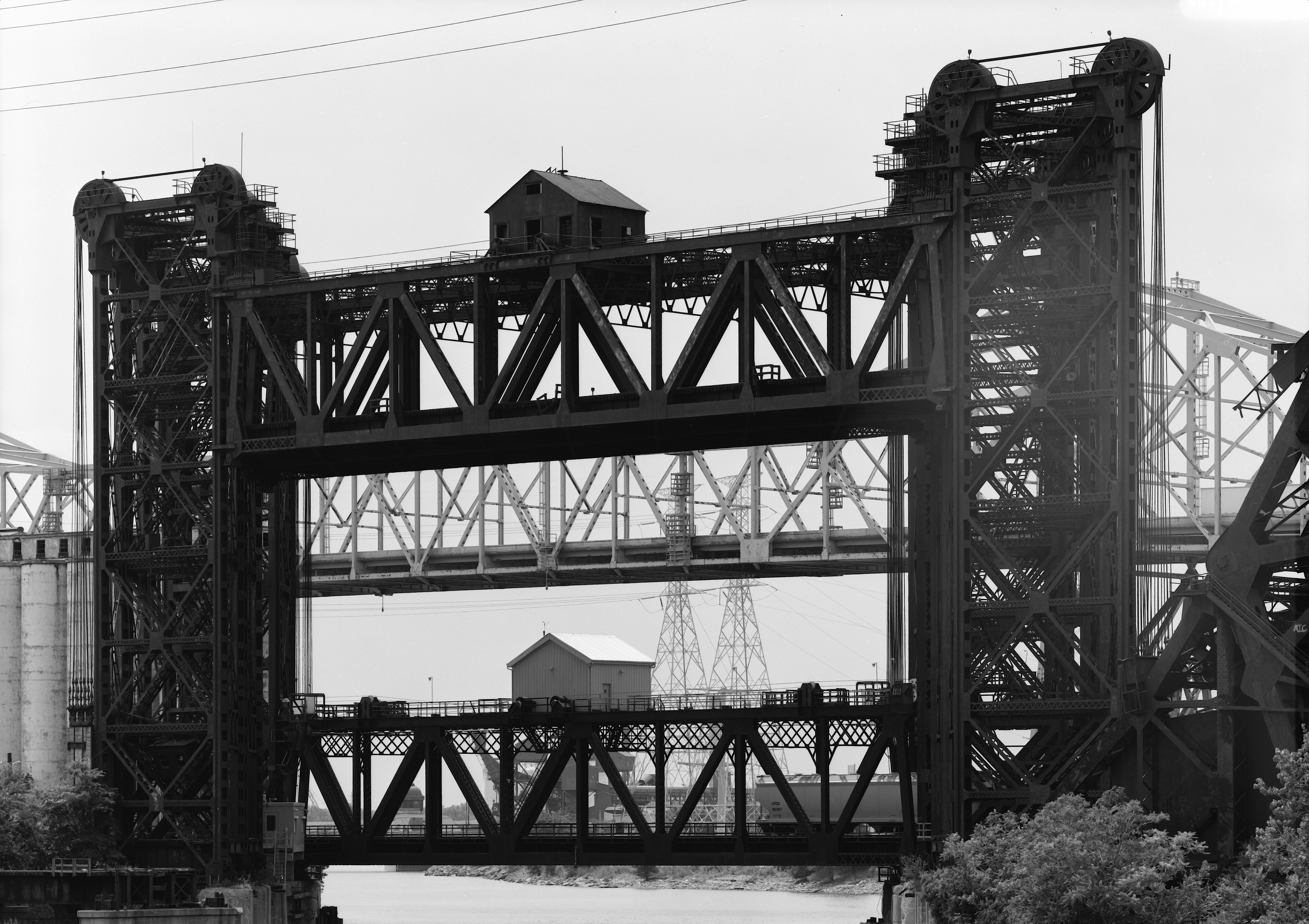
- Bridge No. 6 in 1999.
- Coordinates: 41°43′11″N 87°32′34″W
- Carries: Two tracks per span, four total
- Crosses: Calumet River
- Locale: Chicago, Illinois
- Maintained by: Norfolk Southern Railway

Characteristics
- Design: Vertical-lift bridge
- Material: Steel
- Width: 31 feet (9.4 m) each span
- Longest span: 209.75 feet (63.9 m)
- No. of spans: Two parallel

History
- Designer: Waddell & Harrington
- Constructed by: Dravo Contracting Company
- Construction start: 1912
- Construction end: 1915

Lake Shore and Michigan Southern Railway, Bridge No. 6 is a steel vertical-lift bridge consisting of two parallel spans, carrying two tracks each, across the Calumet River in Chicago, Illinois, United States. The structure is currently owned by Norfolk Southern Railway but disused and kept in a raised position.

The current structure replaces an earlier swing bridge on the same site, built for the Lake Shore and Michigan Southern Railway. When the United States Army Corps of Engineers began calling for its replacement in 1909, both single- and double-leaf bascule bridge options were considered, as well as vertical-lift options. Construction began on foundations for a single, four-track vertical-lift span before changing to the two parallel two-track spans that were completed in 1915.

The bridge was designated as a Chicago Landmark on December 12, 2007.

== See also ==
- List of bridges documented by the Historic American Engineering Record in Illinois
- List of Chicago Landmarks
