= Mill Basin Bridge =

Bridge in Brooklyn, New York

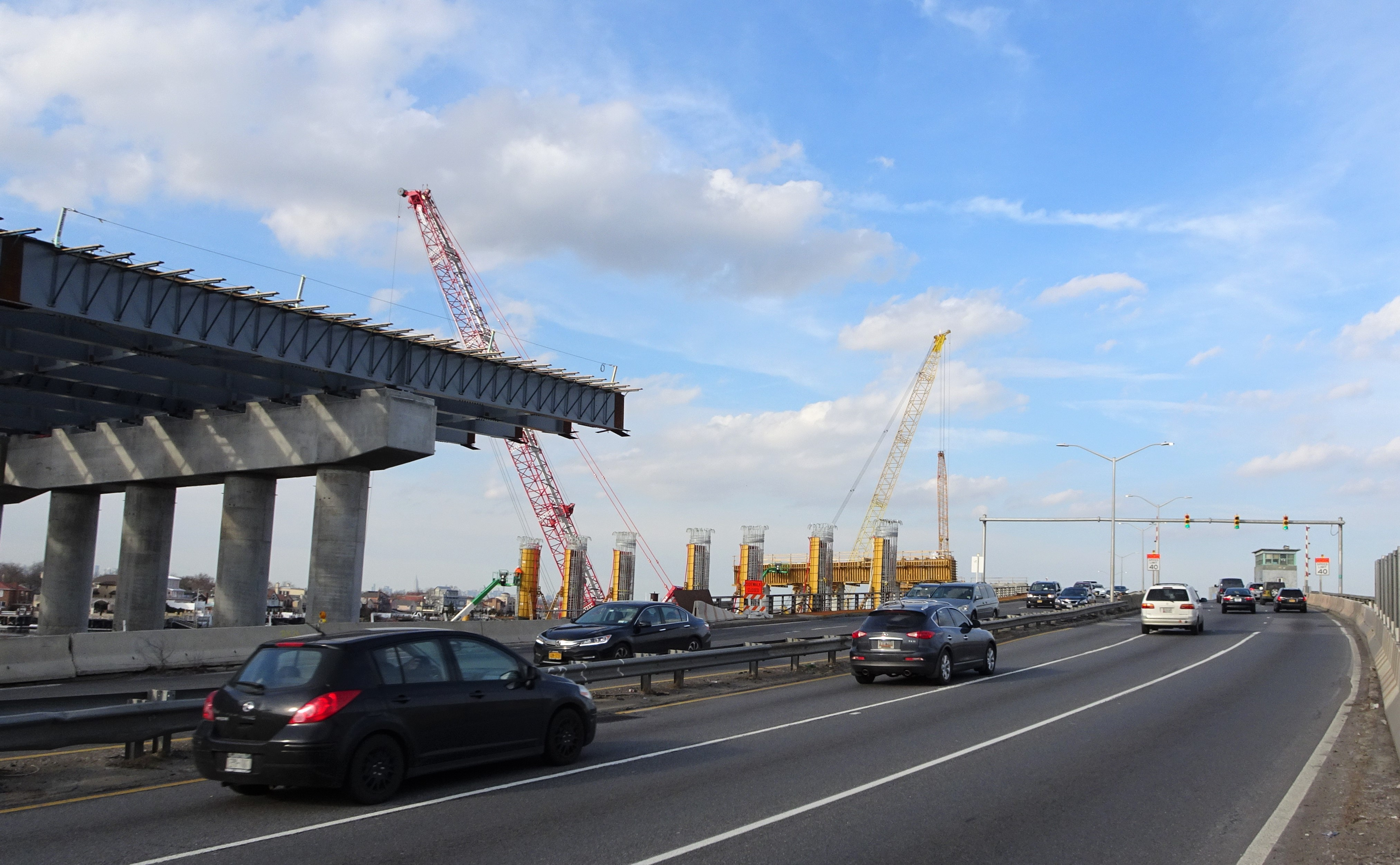
- Coordinates: 40.6046°N 73.8988°W
- Carries: Passenger vehicles (via Belt Parkway); Pedestrians & cyclists (via Jamaica Bay Greenway)
- Crosses: Mill Basin
- Locale: New York City (Brooklyn)
- Maintained by: New York City Department of Transportation
- ID number: 2231471

Characteristics
- Design: Girder Bridge
- Material: Steel, Concrete
- Clearance below: 60 ft (18.3 m) above mean high waterline
- No. of lanes: 7

History
- Designer: HNTB Corporation
- Constructed by: Halmar International
- Construction start: June 2015
- Construction end: February 28, 2019
- Opened: August 30, 2017
- Replaces: Mill Basin Drawbridge (demolished)

Location
- Interactive map of Mill Basin Bridge

Mill Basin Drawbridge (demolished)
- Coordinates: 40°36′17″N 73°53′56″W
- Carries: Passenger vehicles Sidewalk
- Crosses: Mill Basin
- Locale: New York City (Brooklyn)

Characteristics
- Design: Bascule Bridge
- Material: Steel, Concrete
- Total length: 864 ft (263.3 m)
- Longest span: 165 ft (50.3 m)
- Clearance below: 35 ft (10.7 m) above mean high waterline
- No. of lanes: 6

History
- Designer: Waddell & Hardesty
- Opened: June 29, 1940
- Closed: 2017

Location
- Interactive map of Mill Basin Drawbridge (demolished)

The Mill Basin Bridge is a seven-lane, fixed girder bridge in Brooklyn. It is owned and maintained by the New York City Department of Transportation (NYCDOT) and spans Mill Basin inlet. Completed in February 2019, the span replaces a Bascule bridge originally constructed in 1940. The bridge carries passenger vehicles via the Belt Parkway and pedestrians and cyclists via the Jamaica Bay Greenway.

== History ==
=== Background ===
The need for a crossing above Mill Basin inlet was first identified by early 20th-century proposals to build a grade-separated circumferential parkway around the southern and eastern borders of Brooklyn and Queens. In October 1938, the project was finally made possible by a $12 million grant from the federal Public Works Administration. Plans for construction of the 36-mile (58 km) roadway were finalized and voted on by the New York City Department of Parks that same month, with Mill Basin being one of five waterways to be spanned along the western edge of Jamaica Bay by a subsection of the project known as the Shore Parkway.

Due to the area's industrialized waterfront and large shipping infrastructure, Mill Basin saw a heavy volume of marine traffic in the early-to-mid 20th century. This meant that a moveable bridge would be needed to maintain the channel's navigability.

=== Original bridge ===
The United States Department of War granted approval for the original Mill Basin Bridge in April 1939, and it first opened to the public on June 29, 1940. Drawn up by local firm Hardesty & Hanover, the $1.4 million design was a two-leaf bascule bridge with a total length of 864 ft (263 m) including a main span of 165 ft (50 m). The bridge provided 35 ft (11 m) of vertical clearance, a channel width of 131 ft (40 m), and carried two 34-foot (10 m) three-lane roadways in either direction between 6-foot (1.8 m) pedestrian sidewalks.

After the bridge's first full year of operation, it had recorded at least 3,100 openings (roughly 8–9 times per day). That frequency steadily decreased, however, as the city experienced an overall reduction in commercial maritime activity through the latter half of the century.

In January 1950, the drawbridge suffered an electrical fire which damaged its understructure. The incident led to a weekend-long closure of the parkway.

By 1953, the bridge recorded 2,173 openings (roughly 6 times per day), and shortly before its ultimate closure and replacement in 2017, the bridge would only open 210 times.

Concurrent with the city's decrease in shipping, highway traffic was on the rise. Between 2000 and 2009, citywide car ownership had risen from 44% to over 46%, and by 2013, the bridge was carrying an average of 148,000 cars per day. With a full open & close cycle of the bridge requiring no less than ten minutes, vehicle congestion induced along the Belt Parkway became a significant issue.

In 2002, the bridge had to be closed for emergency repairs after a 6-inch (150 mm) wide hole was discovered in the deck.

Proposals to replace all of New York City's moveable bridges had been raised as far back as the 1970s, but decades of underfunding made it difficult to keep the bridges in serviceable condition, let alone pay for replacements. The drawbridge experienced extensive decay through the final decades of its life from at least 1990 onward. Regular inspections consistently revealed its deck and structures to be in "Poor" or "Serious" condition, and the bridge became stuck open multiple times in the years leading up to its retirement. Furthermore, the two roadways were originally separated only by an 8-inch-high median. Police officers requested that the bridge receive a taller barrier in 1995. Between then and 2002, there were five head-on collisions that killed four drivers and paralyzed another. This drove NYCDOT to install a 200-foot-long metal guardrail in 2003. At the time, the original bridge was planned to be replaced beginning in 2004.

=== Replacement ===
In October 2009, NYCDOT launched the first phase of a capital project to reconstruct seven obsolete bridges along the Belt Parkway. Driving the massive investment was a need for modernized highway safety standards like shoulders, median barriers, and superelevation. The new Mill Basin Bridge was scheduled for the project's third phase, with plans specifying a twin-span, fixed girder bridge providing nearly twice the clearance (60 ft; 18 m) of the existing drawbridge. The transition from a moveable bridge to a fixed design would reduce cost and eliminate delays for both maritime & vehicular traffic. Further improvements included wider vehicle lanes and a protected dual-purpose pedestrian/bicycle lane.

To preserve normal vehicle traffic flow during the multi-year project, construction of the new spans began in June 2015 with brush clearing and erosion control at a site located just north of the original drawbridge. Westbound traffic was shifted to the new bridge by August 30, 2017. The old bridge was raised for the final time on December 12, 2017, and demolished in late 2018. Segments of the former concrete towers were cast into the Atlantic Ocean among efforts to expand the artificial Hempstead Reef off the coast of Long Island. Final construction of the new bridge was completed on February 28, 2019.

== Incidents ==
On June 7, 1971, a municipal strike action organized by the International Brotherhood of Teamsters resulted in nearly all of the city's moveable bridges being locked open and purposefully rendered inoperable. The resulting gridlock caused massive city-wide traffic delays for more than a day. By Jun 8, United States Army Corps of Engineers teams were called in to advise city-employed scab workers on restoring bridge service. Investigations found that along with 25 other bridges, the Mill Basin Drawbridge showed evidence of sabotage including missing fuses and rewired controls which took more than 14 hours to repair.

On the night of January 6, 2019, a New York City firefighter was killed after falling between the gap in the new bridge's twin spans while responding to a motor vehicle accident. The bridge's design later drew criticism from engineers suggesting the gap should be barricaded to prevent such an incident.
