= Waddell & Harrington =

American engineering company

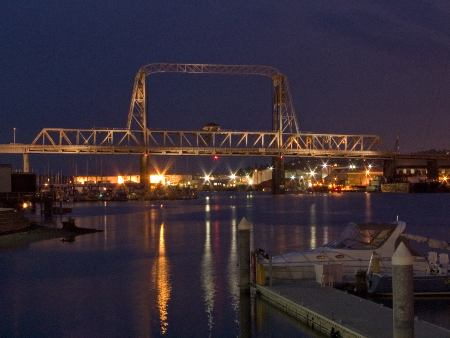
City Waterway Bridge

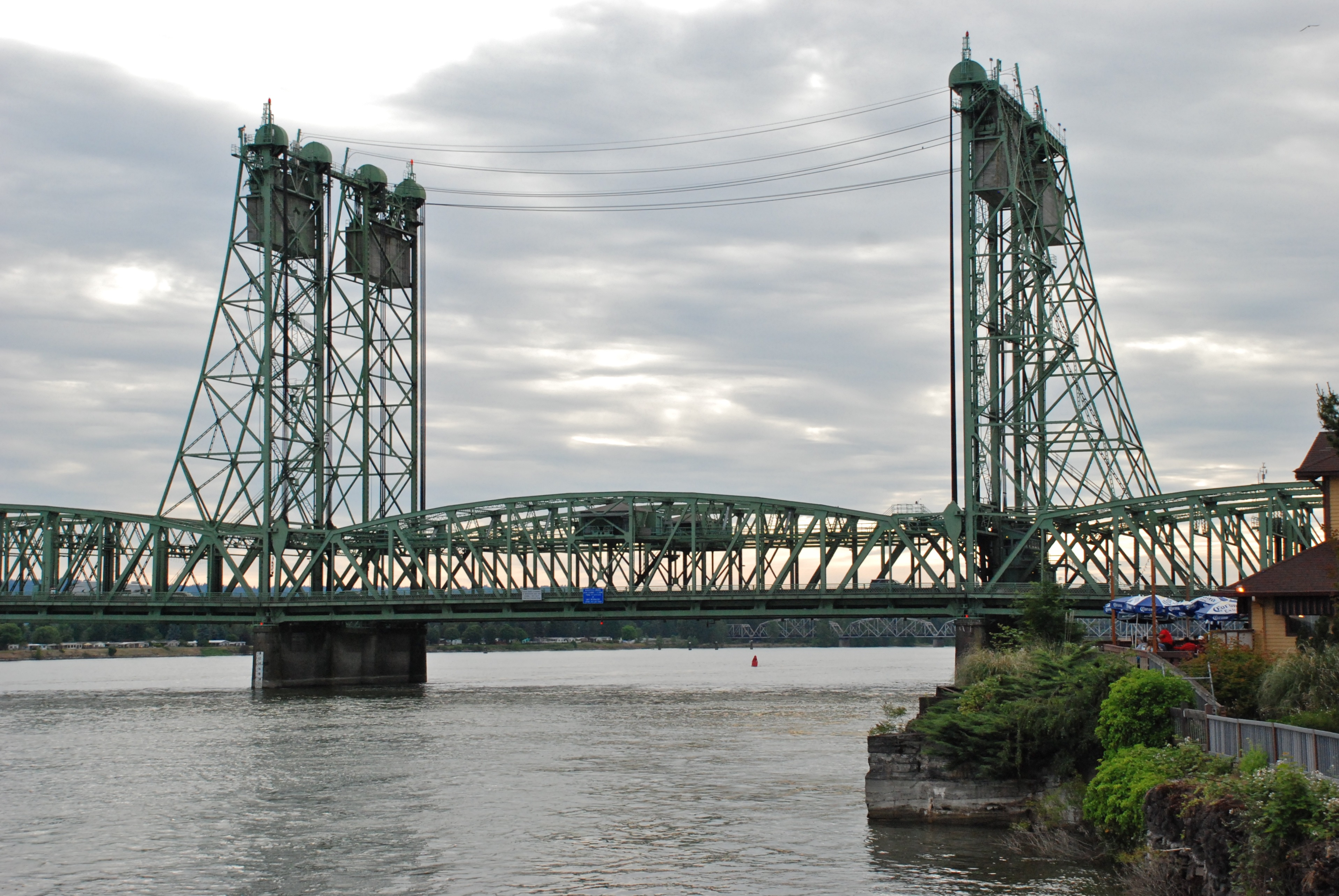
The Interstate Bridge, connecting Portland, Oregon, and Vancouver, Washington (twinned in the 1950s, currently up for replacement)

Waddell & Harrington was an American engineering company that designed bridges from 1907 to 1915. It was formed in 1907 as a partnership of John Alexander Low Waddell (1854–1938) and John Lyle Harrington (1868–1942) and was based in Kansas City, Missouri, but had offices in Portland, Oregon, and Vancouver, British Columbia. The company designed more than 30 vertical-lift bridges for highways and railroads.

The firm also designed one or more non-lift bridges, including the Colorado Street Bridge of Pasadena, California.

A number of its works are listed on the U.S. National Register of Historic Places (NRHP).

== Notable projects ==
Bridges designed by the firm include the following, among others:

- Hawthorne Bridge, spanning the Willamette River in Portland, Oregon, NRHP-listed
- Interstate Bridge, spanning the Columbia River between Portland, Oregon, and Vancouver, Washington; NRHP-listed (as the Portland–Vancouver Highway Bridge)
- Steel Bridge, spanning the Willamette River in Portland
- Iowa Central Railway Bridge over the Mississippi River at Keithsburg, Illinois, built in 1909, since demolished
- Caddo Lake Bridge, LA 538, over the Caddo Lake Mooringsport, LA, NRHP-listed
- City Waterway Bridge, 20th Ave., Spans Ravenna Park Ravine Tacoma, WA, NRHP-listed
- Colorado Street Bridge, Colorado Blvd. Pasadena, CA, NRHP-listed
- North 21st Street Bridge, spans Buckley Gulch, N. Fife and Oakes Tacoma, WA, NRHP-listed
- North 23rd Street Bridge, spans Buckley Gulch, N. Fife and Oakes Tacoma, WA, NRHP-listed
- Union Street Railroad Bridge and Trestle, Jct of Union St. NE and Water St. NE Salem, OR), NRHP-listed
- ASB Bridge over the Missouri River at Kansas City
