= John Alexander Low Waddell =

American civil engineer (1854–1938)

J.A.L. Waddell Order of the Rising Sun
- Born: January 15, 1854; Port Hope, Ontario, Canada
- Died: March 3, 1938 (aged 84); New York City, United States
- Resting place: Fairview Cemetery, Council Bluffs, Iowa
- Education: Rensselaer Polytechnic Institute (C.E.); McGill University (B.A.Sc., Ma.E., D.Sc.)
- Notable work: De Pontibus; Bridge Engineering (two volumes)
- Spouse: Ada Everett (m. 1882)
- Children: 3
- Engineering career
- Discipline: Civil Engineering
- Institutions: Rensselaer Polytechnic Institute; Imperial University at Tokyo
- Practice name: J.A.L. Waddell, Consulting Engineer
- Significant design: Waddell "A" Truss Bridge; Vertical-lift bridge
- Awards: ASCE Norman Medal (x3); AAE Clausen Gold Medal

John Alexander Low Waddell (January 15, 1854 – March 3, 1938, often shortened to J.A.L. Waddell and sometimes known as John Alexander Waddell) was a Canadian-American civil engineer and prolific bridge designer, with more than a thousand structures to his credit. Most of these were in the United States and Canada, with some in Mexico, Russia, China, Japan, and New Zealand. Waddell's work set standards for elevated railroad systems and helped develop materials suitable for large span bridges. His most important contribution was the development of the steam-powered high-lift bridge. Waddell was a widely respected writer on bridge design and engineering theory, as well as an advocate for quality in higher education engineering programs. The company he founded in 1887, 'J.A.L. Waddell, Consulting Engineer,' would eventually become the modern day Hardesty & Hanover, a leading moveable bridge engineering firm. Many of Waddell's surviving bridges are now considered historic landmarks.

== Early life and education ==
Waddell was born on January 15, 1854, in Port Hope, Ontario, Canada, to Robert Waddell (b. 1815) and Angeline E. Jones. His mother was the daughter of William Jones, late colonel of the 27th regiment and sheriff of the city of New York and a member of the State legislature in 1844. Waddell was the oldest child of eight.

Homeschooled until the age of nine, Waddell was reportedly in poor health throughout his youth. He later attended Trinity College School in Port Hope until turning sixteen, when his parents sent him on a ten-month voyage to Hong Kong and Shanghai on the clipper ship N.B. Palmer. In 1875, Waddell obtained his first degree, in civil engineering, from Rensselaer Polytechnic Institute in Troy, New York. In 1882 he married Ava Everett of Council Bluffs, Iowa, the daughter of prominent lawyer Horace Everett. In 1904 he earned a Doctorate of Science (D.Sc) from McGill University.

== Career ==
Waddell began his career by returning to his homeland as a draftsman in Canada's Department of Marine and Fisheries in Ottawa, where he spent a few months designing buoys, lanterns, and similar marine appliances. His next position came as a 'rodman' (surveyor's assistant) on the Canadian Pacific Railway.

He returned to the United States where he designed mines for a West Virginia coal company. In 1878, he returned to Rensselaer and taught mechanics courses until 1880. Waddell then traveled west, obtaining additional degrees from McGill University in Montreal, Quebec, and spending some time working at the Raymond & Campbell firm in Council Bluffs, Iowa.

In July 1882, he was hired as a foreign advisor by the Meiji government of the Empire of Japan and taught at the Tokyo Imperial University while writing two books. That same year, he was also awarded an honorary Bachelor's and Master's of Science each by McGill University.

=== Private practice ===
Waddell returned to the United States in 1886, and one year later established a private engineering practice in Kansas City, Missouri, as J.A.L. Waddell, Consulting Engineer. The firm would later evolve over the decades with various junior partners, including Ira G. Hedrick in 1899, John L. Harrington in 1907, Waddell's own son Needham Everett in 1915, and Shortridge Hardesty in 1927. After Waddell's death, the company became, and continues today as, Hardesty & Hanover.

The company enjoyed great success with railroad clients in particular during its early years; in addition to the wide adoption of Waddell's "A" truss design along the St. Louis Southwestern Railway and Nippon Railway, one 1906 newspaper article from Brownsville, Texas, reported that Dr. Waddell had been responsible for all the bridges on the International–Great Northern Railroad.

Midway through his consulting career, Waddell opened a New York City office, which soon became the firm's headquarters in 1920 amidst the economic boom of the Roaring Twenties. Many of metropolitan area's most important postwar infrastructure projects were awarded to the company, including the Goethals Bridge and Marine Parkway–Gil Hodges Memorial Bridge.

Waddell was also an adviser to the Ministry of Railways, Republic of China. When in China he along with Meloy was entrusted by MIT and Harvard University to talk over with National Southeastern University (later renamed National Central University and then Nanking University) and reached the agreement on founding Sino-American joint engineering college in Shanghai, but it soon ceased due to the wars outbroken in the area.

He was widely recognised, being awarded honours by Japan, Russia, China, and Italy, holding five honorary doctorates (including those from Japan, Canada, and Puerto Rico) and being elected an Honorary Member of the American Society of Civil Engineers in 1936.

== Notable works ==
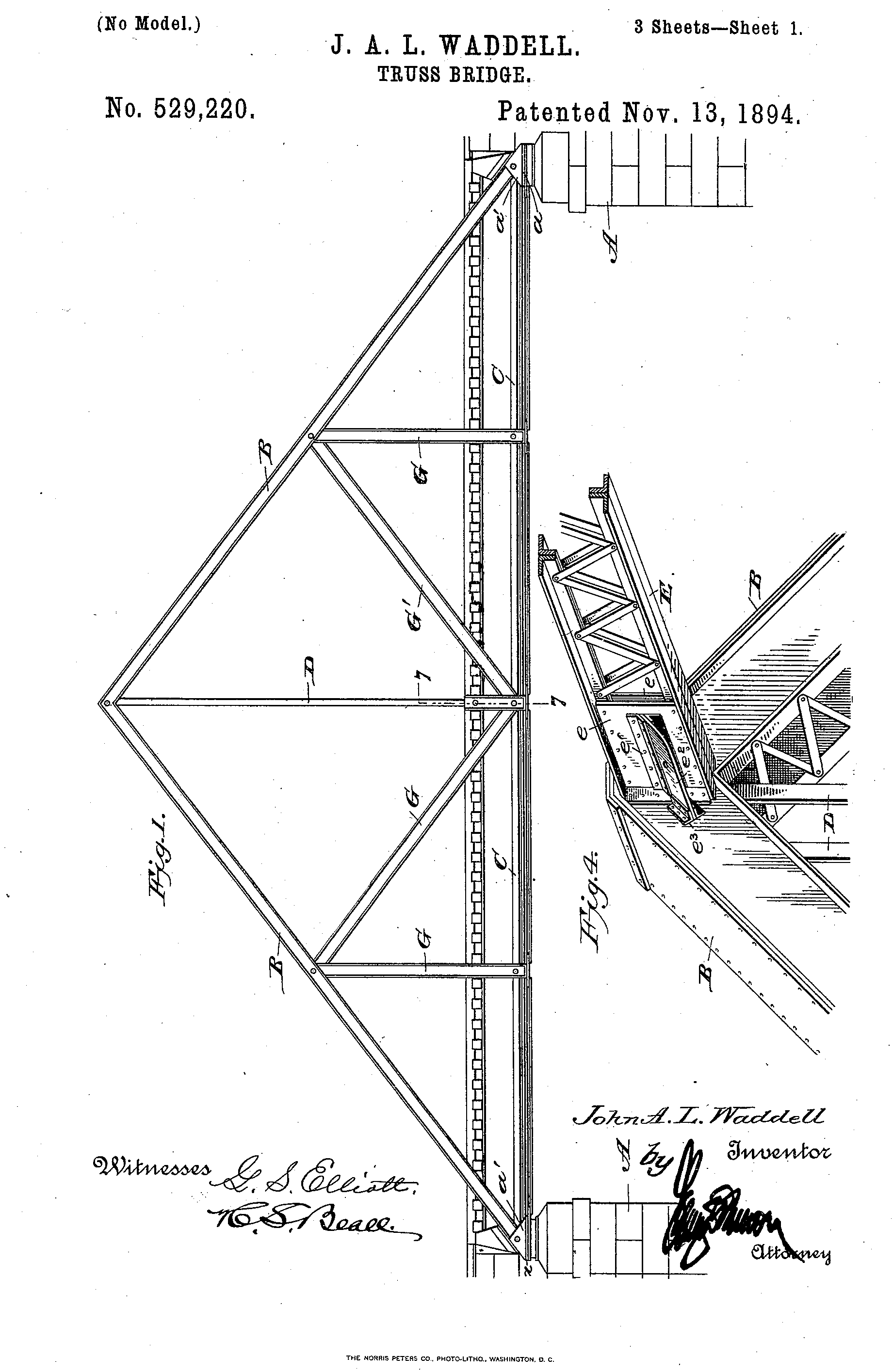
Waddell "A" Truss Bridge Patent (1894)

=== Truss bridge ===
One of Waddell's earliest contributions to the field of civil engineering was the "A" Truss bridge. Patented in 1893, the cost-effective design allowed for cheap and rapid construction, and could easily carry the heavy loads generated by steam locomotive-powered trains. Replicated throughout the Empire of Japan and the American West and Midwest, this basic design contributed to the rapid expansion of several railway companies during the Second Industrial Revolution.

=== Vertical-lift bridge ===
Lifting and swinging bridges had been used for generations, but not on the scale that they exist today. Waddell was the first to invent a modern design, originally intended to span a short channel across Minnesota Point in the harbor of Duluth, Minnesota. His design won a city contest in 1892, but the War Department objected to the proposal. The city built an aerial transporter bridge in that location in 1905. In 1929, it was remodeled into the Aerial Lift Bridge, similar to Waddell's design.

Waddell adapted his vertical-lift concept in 1893 and it was finally built as the South Halsted Street Lift-Bridge over the Chicago River. While the city of Chicago was the first to build a lift bridge of Waddell's design, the second had to wait for his partnership with mechanical engineer John Lyle Harrington, formed in 1907. Waddell & Harrington designed a vertical lift bridge (since demolished) for the Iowa Central Railway over the Mississippi River at Keithsburg, Illinois, in 1909. The pair designed more than two dozen more vertical lift bridges over the next five years before Harrington left in 1914, among them the ASB Bridge in Kansas City Missouri.

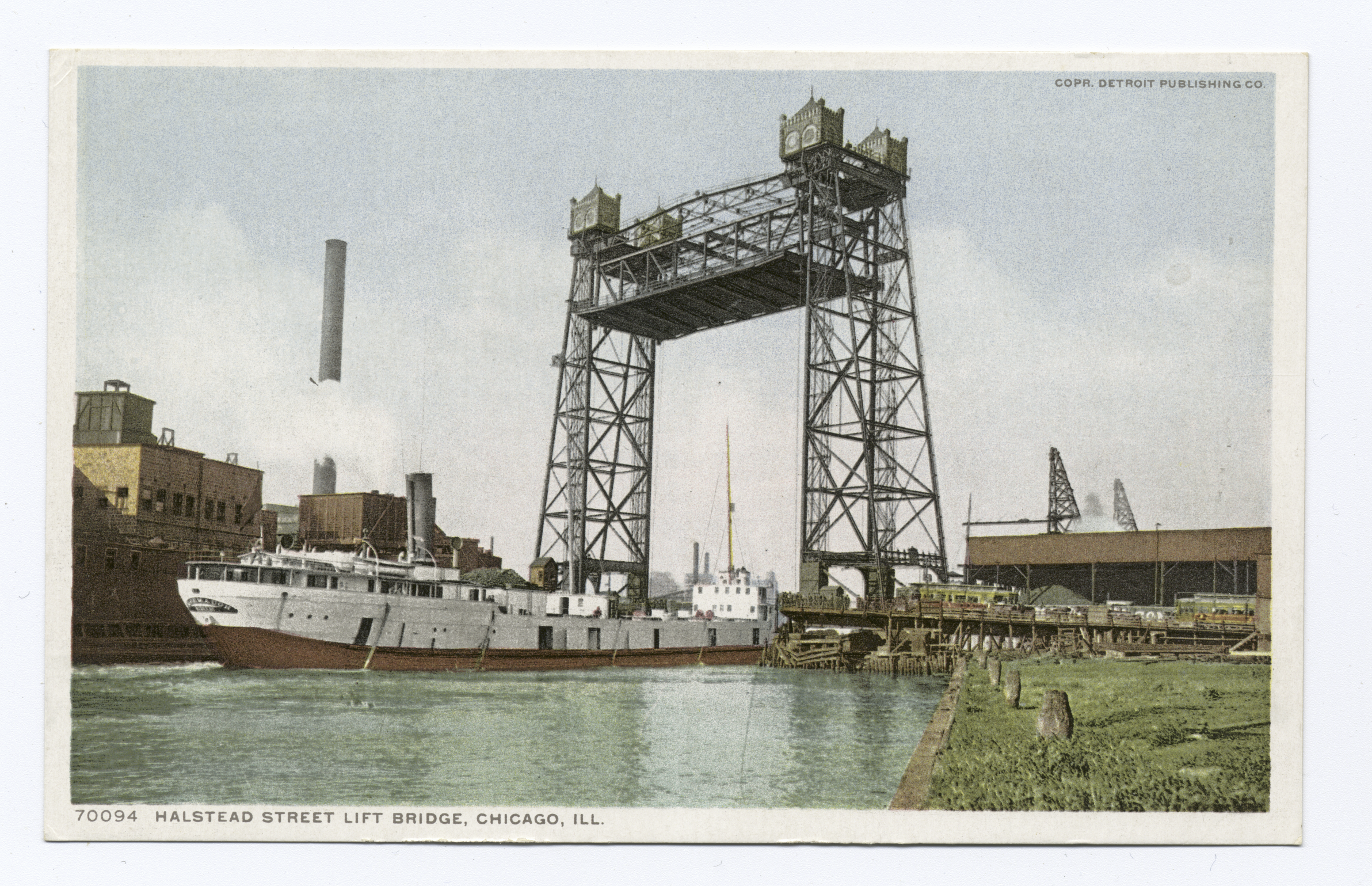
South Halsted Street Lift Bridge, Chicago

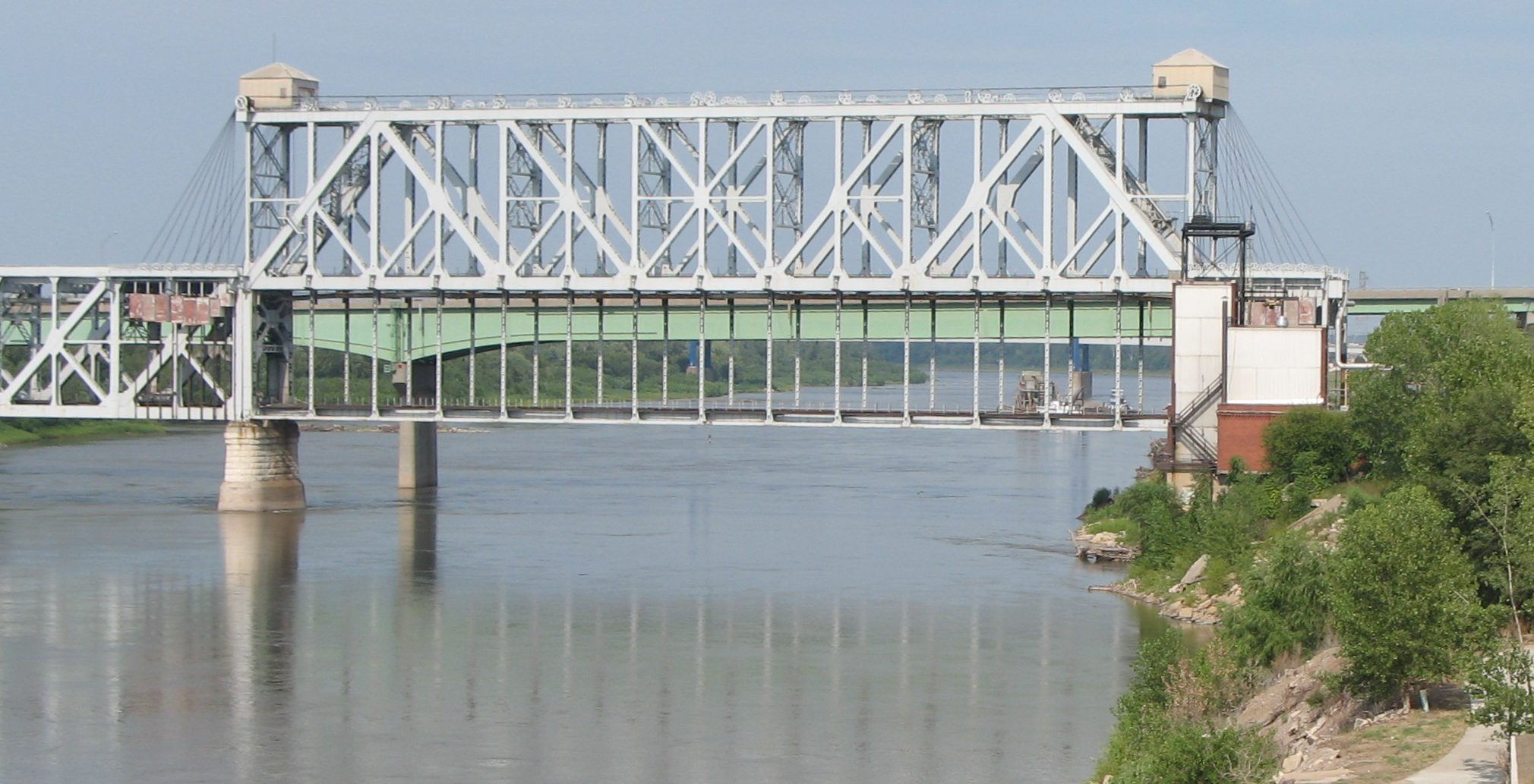
ASB Bridge in Kansas City, Missouri

=== List of major projects ===
- South Halsted Street Lift-Bridge, Chicago, Illinois (1893)
- Chicago "L", Chicago, Illinois (1894-97)
- Waddell "A" Truss Bridge Parkville, Missouri (1898) (U.S. patent 529,220)
- Kansas City Southern Railroad Bridge, Cross Bayou Shreveport, Louisiana (1890, re-erected 1926)
- Hawthorne Bridge, Portland, Oregon (1910)
- Armour-Swift-Burlington Bridge, Kansas City, Missouri (1911)
- Steel Bridge, Portland, Oregon (1912)
- Colorado Street Bridge, Pasadena, California (1913)
- 11th Street Bridge (aka Murray Morgan Bridge), Tacoma, Washington (1913)
- Snowden Bridge, Bainville and Fairview, Montana (1913)
- Caddo Lake Drawbridge, Mooringsport, Louisiana (1914)
- Twelfth Street Trafficway Viaduct, Kansas City, Missouri (1915)
- Detroit-Superior Bridge, Cleveland, Ohio (1917)
- Interstate Bridge, Vancouver, Washington, and Portland, Oregon (1917)
- Washington Bridge, Milford and Stratford, Connecticut (1921)
- Memorial Bridge, Portsmouth, New Hampshire, and Kittery, Maine (1923)
- CRRNJ Newark Bay Bridge, Elizabethport and Bayonne, New Jersey (1926)
- Outerbridge Crossing, Perth Amboy, New Jersey, and Staten Island, New York (opened June 29, 1928)
- Goethals Bridge, Elizabeth, New Jersey, and Staten Island, New York (opened June 29, 1928; replaced 2017)
- Lower Hack Lift, Kearny and Jersey City, New Jersey (1928)
- Route 46 Hackensack River Bridge, Little Ferry and Ridgefield Park, New Jersey (1934)
- Fourteenth Street (L&I) Bridge, Louisville, Kentucky (1918)

== Death ==
Four years after the death of his wife Ada, Waddell died on March 3, 1938, in his Manhattan apartment at the Hotel Earle. According to an obituary his death was caused by complications from a stroke, suffered 3 months prior. Waddell is memorialized with his wife at Fairview Cemetery in Council Bluffs, Iowa.

== Partial bibliography ==
- The Designing of Ordinary Iron Highway Bridges, [1884] (1891), 5th edition (in English). New York: John Wiley & Sons, 252 pages.
- System of Iron Railroad Bridges for Japan (1885). Tokyo: Tokyo University, 258 pages.
- De Pontibus: A Pocket-book for Bridge Engineers, (1898) 1st edition. New York: John Wiley & Sons, 403 pages.
- Principal professional papers of Dr. J. A. L. Waddell, civil engineer, Waddell, J. (Ed.). (1905). Retrieved from on December 31, 2017.
- Bridge Engineering, Volume I and Volume II, (1916). New York: John Wiley & Sons, 2,177 pages.
- Engineering Economics, Waddell, John Alexander Low., University of Kansas, 1917. Accessed at on December 31, 2017.
- Economics of Bridgework: A Sequel to Bridge Engineering (1921). New York: John Wiley & Sons, 512 pages.
- The engineering profession fifty years hence. Lancaster, Pa.: Press of the New Era Print. Co. (1918).
- Memoirs and Addresses of Two Decades, with Frank Woodward Skinner, edited by J.L. Harrington (1928). New York: Mack Printing Company, 1,174 pages.
- Vocational Guidance in Engineering Lines (1933) by the Committee on Engineering Education of the American Association of Engineers. Waddell was a contributor.

== See also ==
- Waddell & Harrington
