= ASB Bridge =

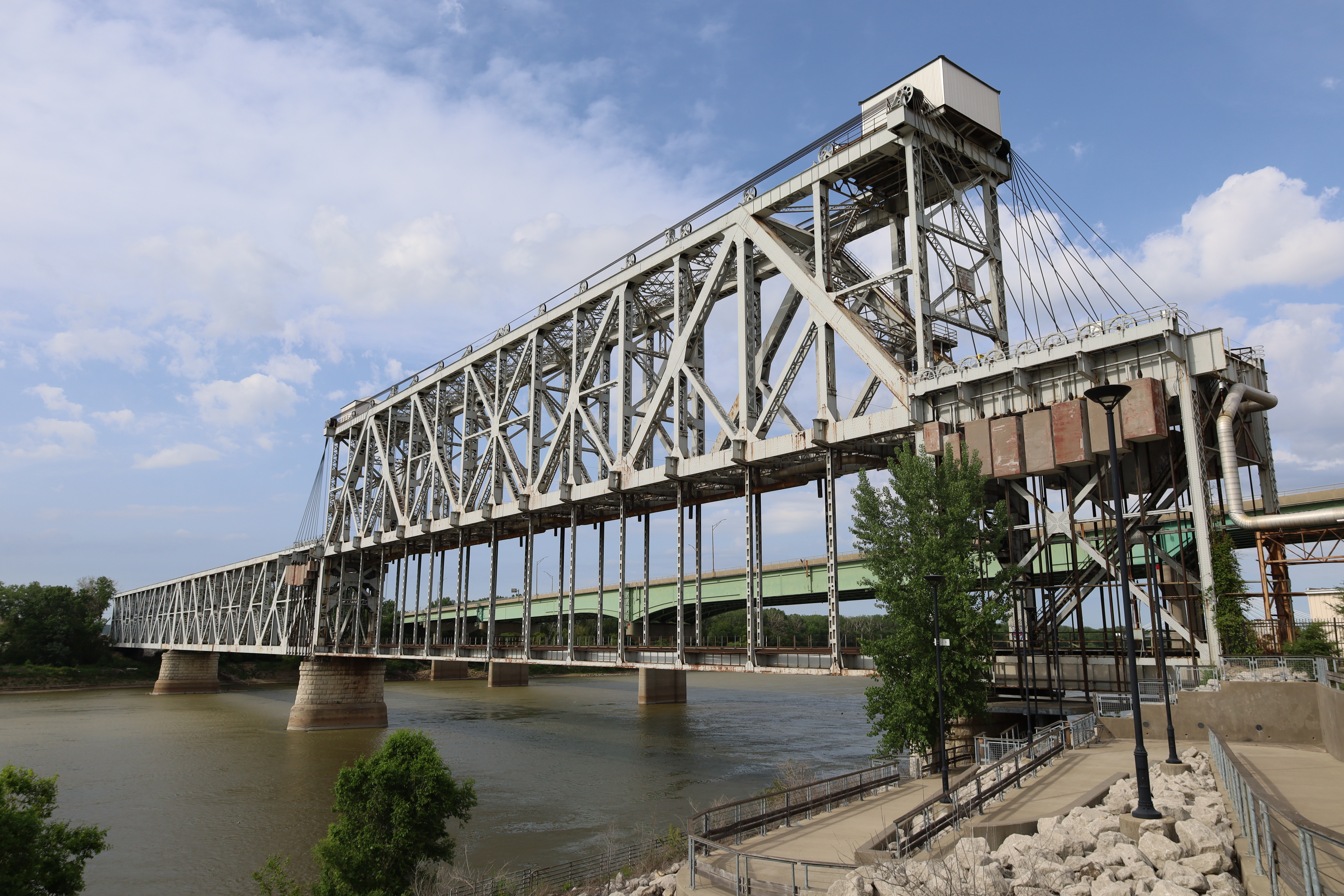
- The bridge in 2025
- Coordinates: 39°06′59″N 94°34′47″W
- Carries: Railroads; (formerly automobiles)
- Crosses: Missouri River
- Locale: Kansas City, Missouri, and North Kansas City, Missouri
- Official name: Armour-Swift-Burlington Bridge
- Other name(s): Winner bridge, Fratt Bridge
- Named for: Armour-Swift-Burlington
- Maintained by: BNSF Railway
- Preceded by: Second Hannibal Bridge
- Followed by: Heart of America Bridge

Characteristics
- Design: Double-deck truss bridge with vertical lift
- Total length: 1,282 ft (391 m)
- Longest span: 428 ft (130 m)

History
- Designer: Waddell & Harrington
- Opened: 1911

Location
- Interactive map of ASB Bridge

The Armour–Swift–Burlington (ASB) Bridge, also known as the North Kansas City Bridge and the LRC Bridge, is a vertical-lift bridge crossing the Missouri River in Kansas City, Missouri. Its lower deck carries a rail line of the BNSF Railway, and its upper deck formerly carried automobile traffic of Missouri Route 9; the bridge was designed so that the rail deck could be raised without blocking automobile traffic.

The ASB has a 428-foot (130 m) main span, making it the ninth-longest vertical-lift drawbridge in the United States. The bridge is one of two of the type that had automobile traffic on the upper level, and rail traffic on the lower level. The lower deck can be raised to permit riverboats to pass without interrupting car traffic on top. This design allows the hangers from the lower deck to go through the truss members of the upper deck.

== History ==
=== Construction ===
The nine stone masonry piers were built in 1890. However, engineer John Alexander Low Waddell did not agree with piers, and later that year lack of funding prevented the bridge from being built. The piers would sit unused until 1909.

In 1909, Waddell & Harrington designed the current bridge and construction started. The bridge was funded by a combination of Armour Packing Company, Swift & Company, and Chicago, Burlington and Quincy Railroad. The piers were shaved to ten feet above high-water mark. On December 28, 1911, the bridge opened to traffic, with two lanes of automobile on upper level, one track of railroad on lower.

=== Operation ===
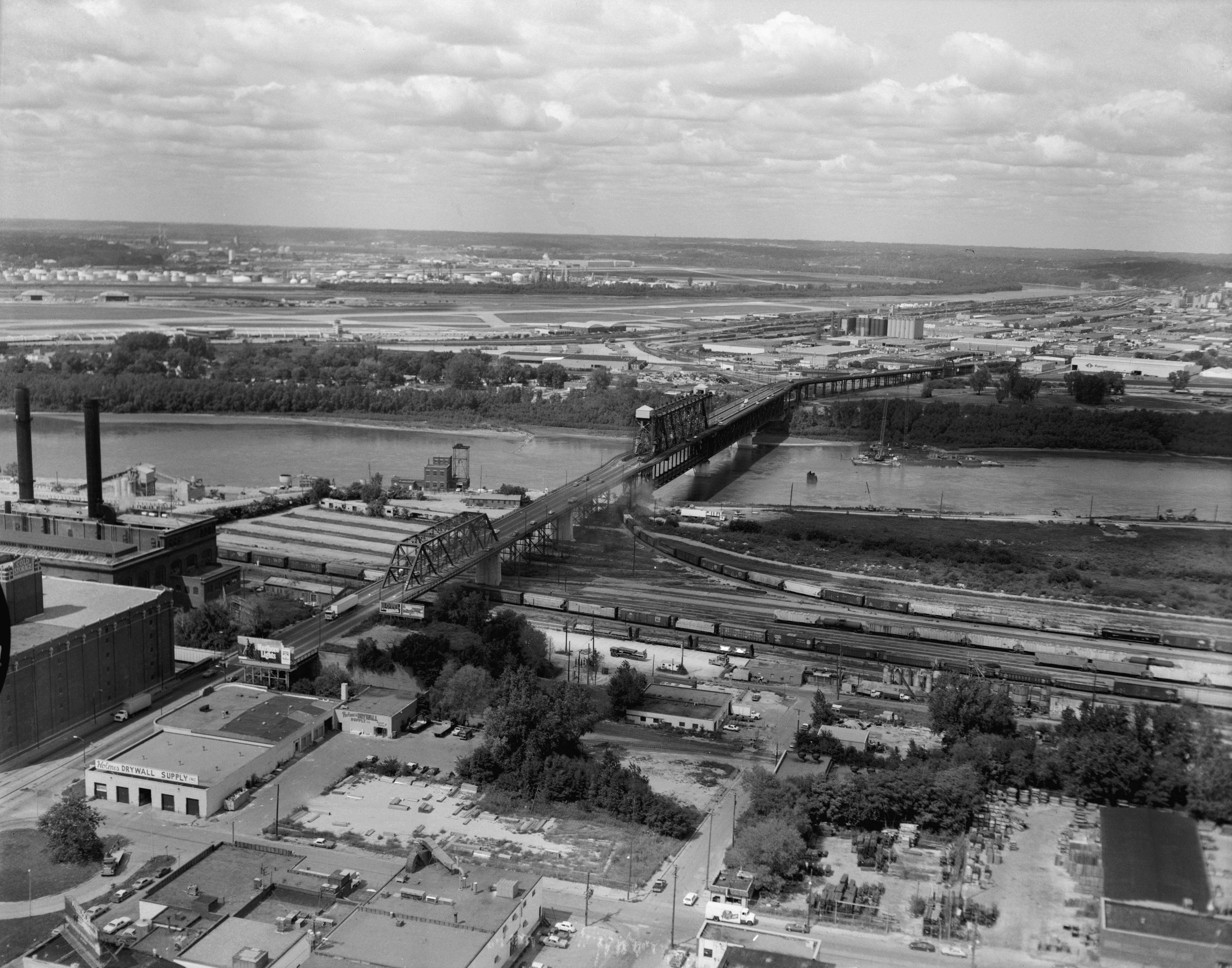
The bridge with road deck, c. 1981

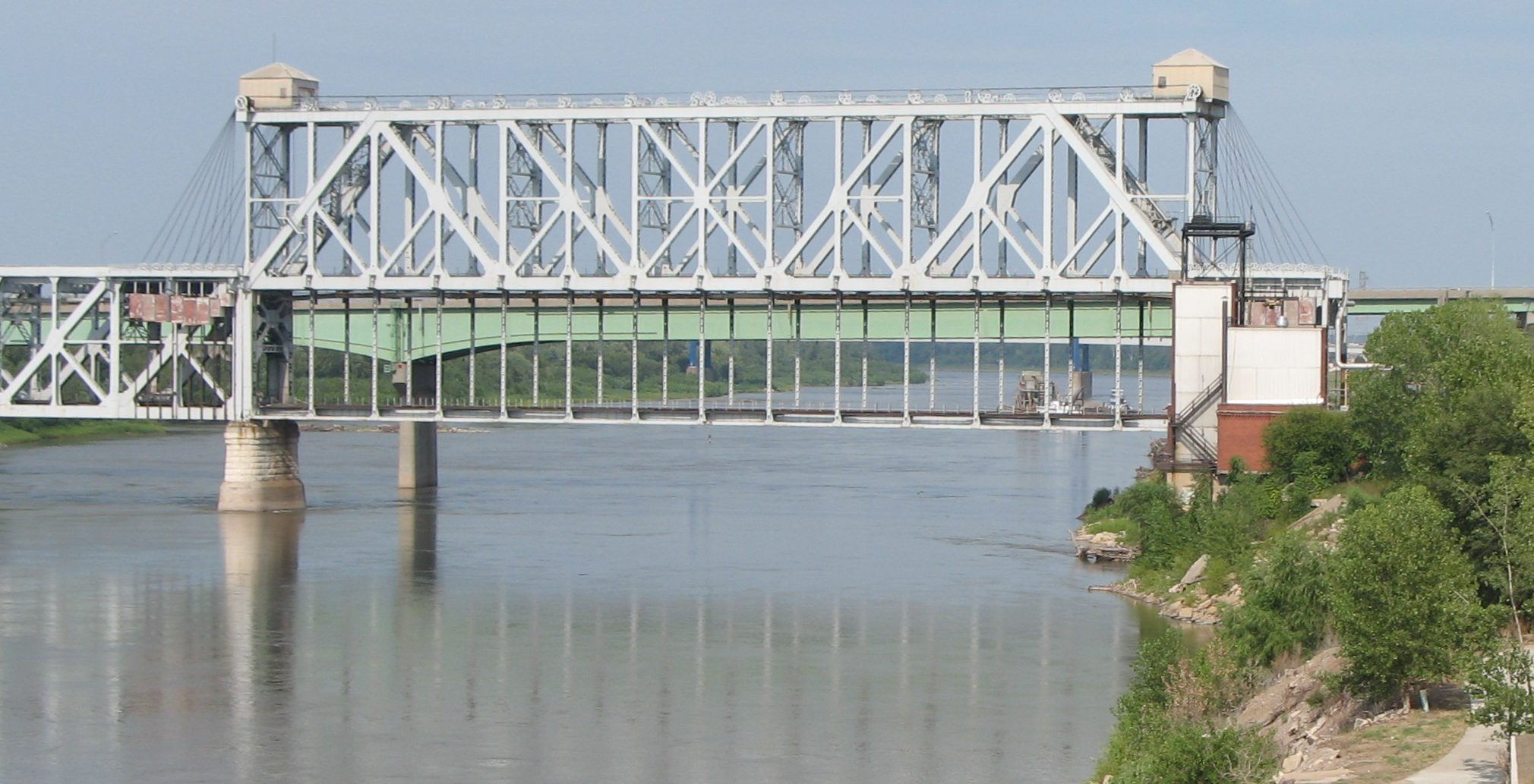
ASB Bridge from Westport Landing, span in lowered position, in 2006

In January 1913, electric interurban cars began use of streetcar rails on upper deck; they would operate until 1948. During 1915–1926, the bridge was part of the Jefferson Highway. The south approach span was damaged in fire May 2, 1927, and replaced later that month.

In August 1927, the bridge was taken over by Missouri State Highway Department and the tolls removed. The bridge floor was replaced in 1927, the steel girder span over Second Street in 1932, and the bridge deck in 1948. In 1949, collars placed around river piers to prevent rust, and the bridge was cleaned and repainted in 1950.

The bridge survived a 1951 flood. The north approach was widened in 1952 and again in 1966, with the bridge deck repaired in 1967.

In 1977, the state highway department banned traffic weighing six tons or more from using the outer lanes of the upper deck due to concerns that the girders holding them up could fail. The girder lines on downstream side of railroad deck were repaired during 1981–1982.

=== Conversion to rail-only bridge ===
In 1987, the Heart of America Bridge opened to the east to replace the vehicular portion. The ASB Bridge's upper deck surface was removed, and bridge was given to the Burlington Northern Railroad, during 1988–1989.

In 1996, the remaining part of the ASB was designated by the American Society of Civil Engineers as a National Historic Civil Engineering Landmark, for being one of only two of that type ever built in the United States.

== See also ==
- List of bridges documented by the Historic American Engineering Record in Missouri
- List of crossings of the Missouri River
