= Waddell "A" Truss Bridge =

Bridge design

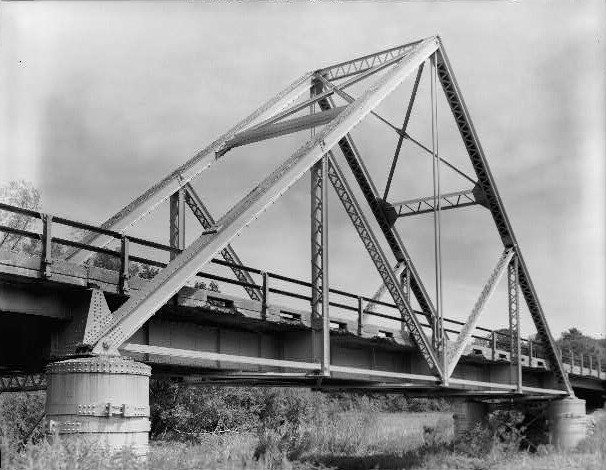
Waddell "A" Truss bridge erected at Trimble, MO

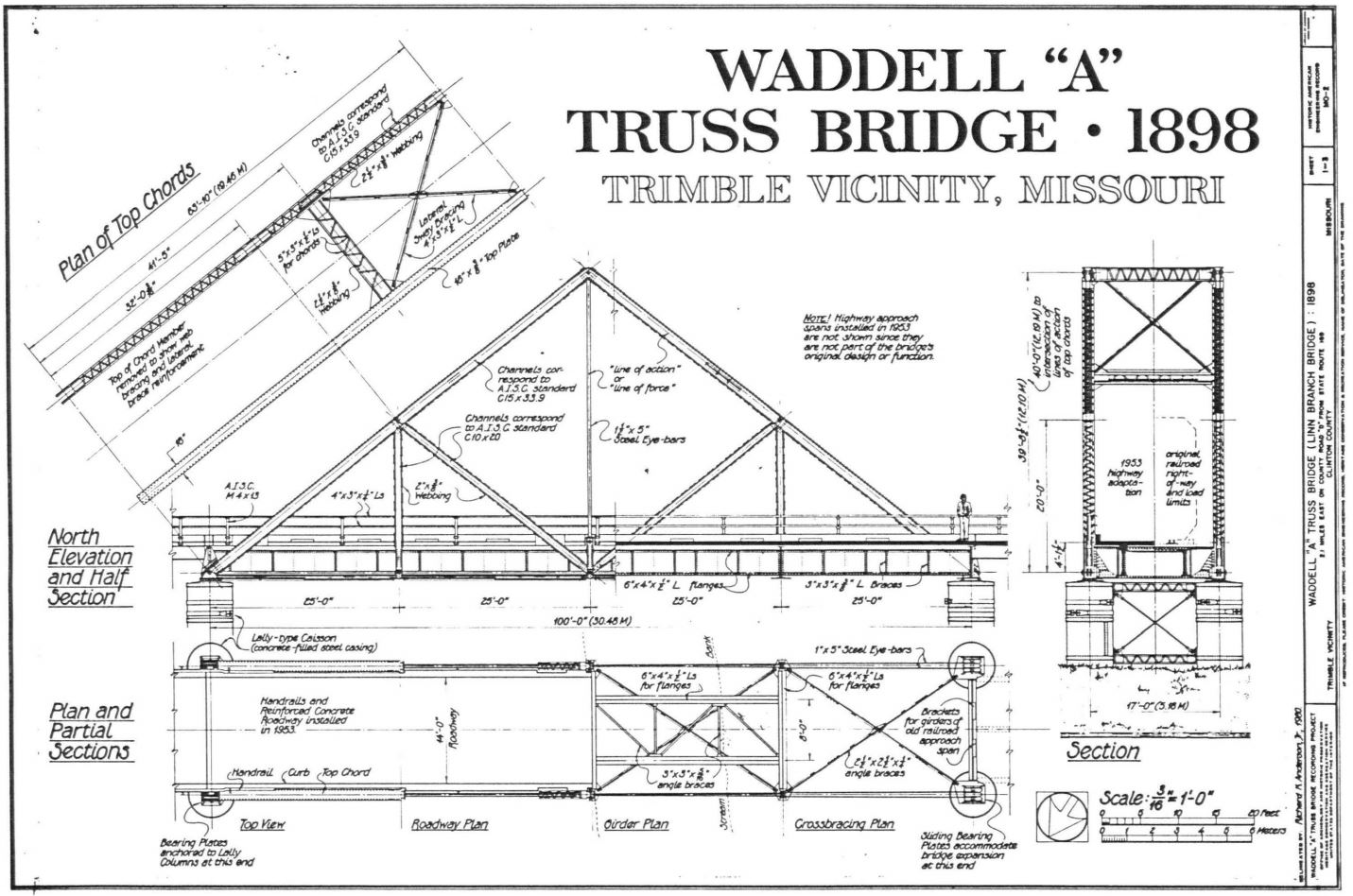
Design plan of the Waddell "A" Truss - reconstructed by HAER & United States Army Corps of Engineers (1980)

The Waddell "A" Truss Bridge is standardized truss bridge design that was first patented in 1893 by prolific civil engineer John Alexander Low Waddell. The design provided a simple low-cost, high-strength solution for use by railroads across the United States and Empire of Japan for short spans of around 100 ft (30.5 m). According to the Historic American Engineering Record (HAER), "beyond its role in the growth of railroad transportation, the "A" truss is perhaps most historically significant when viewed within the context of Waddell's career and the emergence of the American bridge fabrication industry into international marketing."

== Development ==
As a young civil engineer, J.A.L. Waddell spent the first decade after his graduation from Rensselaer Polytechnic Institute in the academic realm. He taught at his alma mater, authored numerous engineering papers, and eventually served as the Chair of Civil Engineering at the Imperial University at Tokyo between 1882-1886. It was during this time in Japan that Waddell made many critical observations of the small-span bridges commonly in use on Japanese railroads at that point– almost all of which were designed by British engineers utilizing a riveted pony truss design. As he would later recall in his 1898 publication De Pontibus:

For a number of years the author was dissatisfied with all railroad bridges for spans between the superior limit of the plate-girder and a length of about one hundred and fifty feet, ordinary pin-connected through-Pratt trusses being too light and vibratory, and the riveted bridges as then built being clumsy, unscientific, and uneconomical.

— J.A.L. Waddell

To solve inadequate top-chord lateral bracing of less-rigid truss styles, Waddell's solution called for a 4-panel, triangular steel truss employing eyebars for the lower-chord and center-vertical elements, rigid beams for the rest of the structure, and heavy lateral bracing at the top point of the "A". The goal of this layout was to ease construction and minimize material costs, while still providing high rigidity and strength through foolproof pin-connected members.

== Reception ==
Although Waddell began a private engineering consulting firm in 1887, it would not be until 1893 that he was given a chance to put his ideas to the test. In April of that year he was contracted by the General Manager of the Kansas City, Pittsburg and Gulf Railroad to "design some bridges." After the initial plans of Waddell's 100 ft (30.5 m) span were reviewed by the railroad, Waddell quickly secured an initial order for construction of four examples. The design was also frequently built along the St. Louis Southwestern Railway and Nippon Railway. The bridge eventually fell out of favor after the turn of the century due advances in portable pneumatic riveting processes, as well as increased utilization of the Pratt truss style design.

== Examples ==
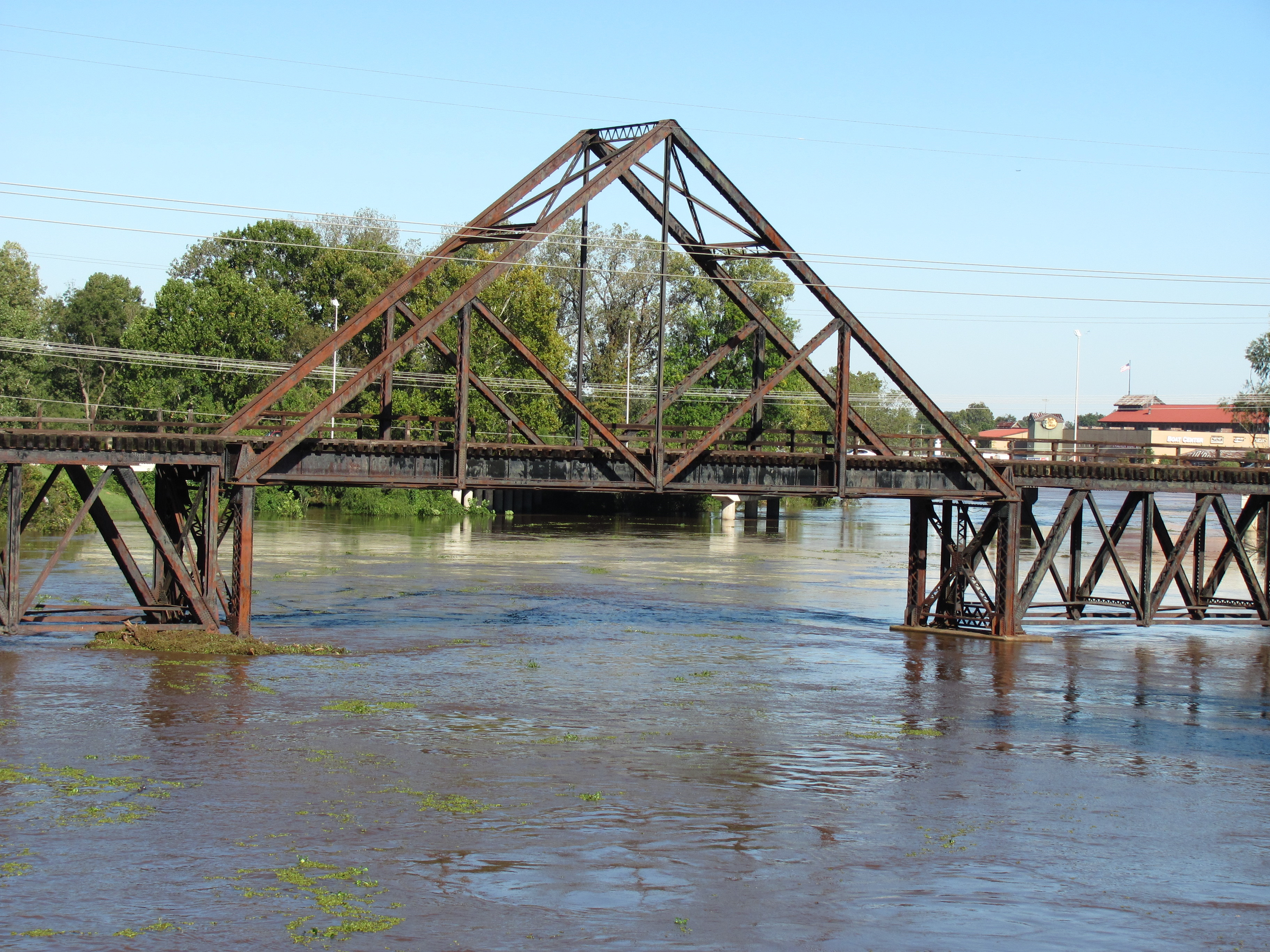
Kansas City Southern Railroad Bridge, Cross Bayou (present-day)

Only two known examples of Waddell's "A" truss still exist. Due to the design's significance with respect to both the progress of American civil engineering and the legacy of J.A.L. Waddell, each has been designated a National Historic Place for more than three decades.

=== Linn Branch Creek Bridge ===
Built near Trimble, Missouri in 1898, this bridge originally carried the Quincy, Omaha, and Kansas City Railroad before its abandonment in 1939. It later served as a state highway before being surveyed, disassembled, and stored by the United States Army Corps of Engineers due to the construction of Smithville Lake on its original site. It was restored in 1987 and relocated to Parkville, Missouri, where it serves as a functional historical monument in English Landing Park.

=== Kansas City Southern Railroad Bridge, Cross Bayou ===
Although the exact year and location of its original construction is apparently unknown, this structure was reportedly first built across the Arkansas River in Oklahoma. Since a 1926 relocation, it has spent the majority of its life in downtown Shreveport, Louisiana. The bridge carried the Kansas City Southern Railway until the line's abandonment in the 1980s. It currently sits abandoned with the original trackage still installed.
