= Linn Branch =

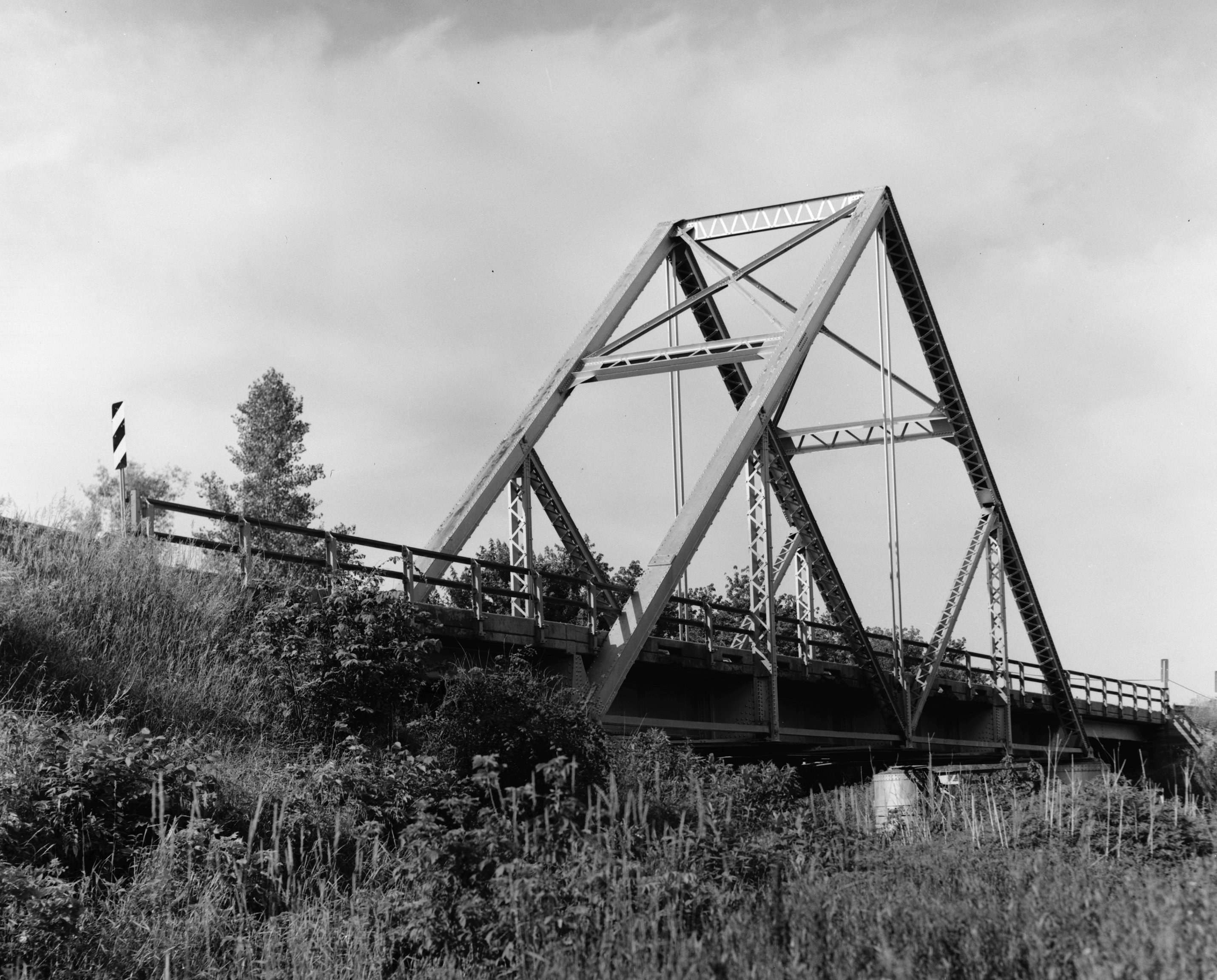
- Historic bridge that once crossed this stream

Location
- Country: United States
- State: Missouri
- County: Clinton

Physical characteristics
- Source
  - location: Atchison Township, Clinton County
  - coordinates: 39°32′51″N 94°33′15″W
  - elevation: 1,020 ft (310 m)
- Mouth: Little Platte River
  - location: Hardin Township, Clinton County
  - coordinates: 39°28′37″N 94°31′49″W
  - elevation: 860 ft (260 m)
- Length: 8.6 mi (13.8 km)

Basin features
- Progression: Linn Branch → Little Platte River → Platte River → Missouri River → Mississippi River → Atlantic Ocean

Linn Branch is a stream in southwestern Clinton County, Missouri in the United States. It is a tributary of the Little Platte River and is 8.6 miles (13.8 km) long.

The origin of the stream name was thought to have been derived from an early settler. A variant name was Lynn Branch.

The stream begins in south-central Atchison Township and flows southwesterly into Hardin Township before crossing US 169. It then forms the western boundary to the village of Grayson before turning southeast and crossing over US 169 again. It continues southeast and enters Smithville Lake northeast of Trimble.

The stream had one named direct tributary, Roberts Branch.

A unique historic bridge, called the Waddell "A" Truss Bridge crossed this stream along the single-tracked segment of the Quincy, Omaha, and Kansas City Railroad between Plattsburg and Trimble.

== See also ==
- Tributaries of the Little Platte River
- List of rivers of Missouri
