= Camp Branch (Little Platte River tributary) =

Stream in Missouri, U.S.

Location
- Country: United States
- State: Missouri
- County: Clinton and Clay

Physical characteristics
- Source
  - location: Clinton Township, Clinton County
  - coordinates: 39°27′53″N 94°25′52″W
  - elevation: 950 ft (290 m)
- Mouth: Smithville Lake
  - location: Platte Township, Clay County
  - coordinates: 39°24′20″N 94°32′08″W
  - elevation: 863 ft (263 m)
- Length: 12.7 mi (20.4 km)

Basin features
- Progression: Camp Branch → Little Platte River → Platte River → Missouri River → Mississippi River → Atlantic Ocean

Camp Branch is a stream in Clinton and Clay counties in the U.S. state of Missouri. It is a tributary of the Little Platte River and is 12.7 miles (20.4 km) long.

The stream has also been denoted as Camp Creek. Camp Branch has two named direct tributaries, Holtzclaw Creek and Owl Creek.

== See also ==
- Tributaries of the Little Platte River
- List of rivers of Missouri
