= Roberts Creek =

Roberts Creek or Robert Creek may refer to:

- Roberts Creek, British Columbia, a community in Canada
- Roberts Creek (Iowa), a tributary of the Turkey River
- Robert Creek (Minnesota)

== See also ==
- Roberts Branch (disambiguation)
