= Wilkerson Creek (Little Platte River tributary) =

Stream in northwest Missouri, U.S.

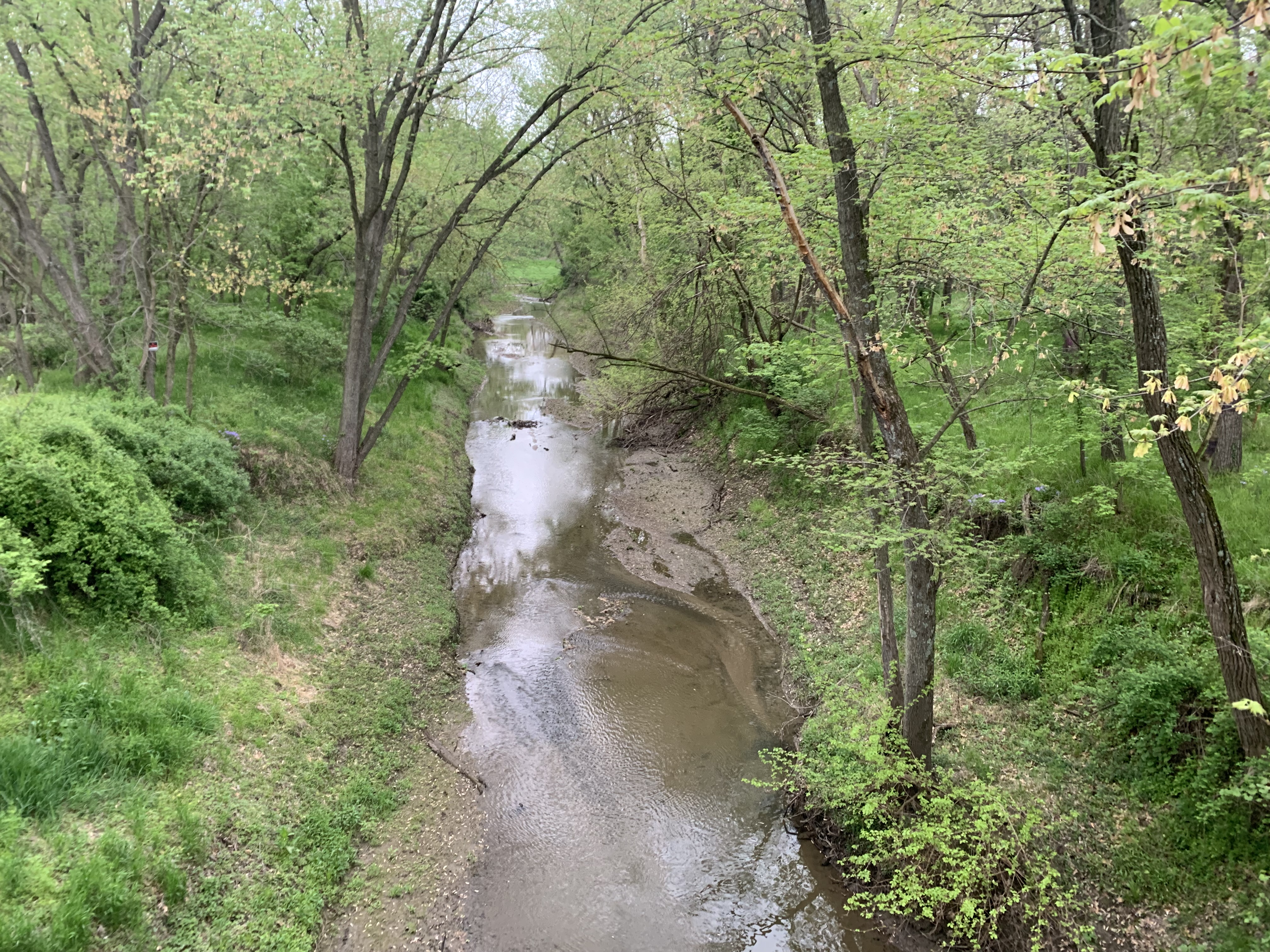
- Wilkerson Creek at Route DD bridge in Smithville just before it deposits into the Little Platte River

Location
- Country: United States
- State: Missouri
- County: Clay

Physical characteristics
- Source
  - location: Platte Township, Clay County
  - coordinates: 39°18′18″N 94°31′38″W
  - elevation: 980 ft (300 m)
- Mouth: Little Platte River
  - location: Smithville, Platte Township, Clay County
  - coordinates: 39°23′07″N 94°34′14″W
  - elevation: 810 ft (250 m)
- Length: 9.4 mi (15.1 km)

Basin features
- Progression: Wilkerson Creek → Little Platte River → Platte River → Missouri River → Mississippi River → Atlantic Ocean

Wilkerson Creek is a stream in western Clay County, Missouri in the United States. It is a tributary of the Little Platte River and is 9.4 miles (15.1 km) long.

The stream has also been denoted as Wilkerson Branch. Wilkerson Creek flows through the city of Smithville. It has two named tributaries, Polecat Creek and Rocky Branch.

== See also ==
- Tributaries of the Little Platte River
- List of rivers of Missouri
