= Horse Fork =

Stream in northwest Missouri, U.S.

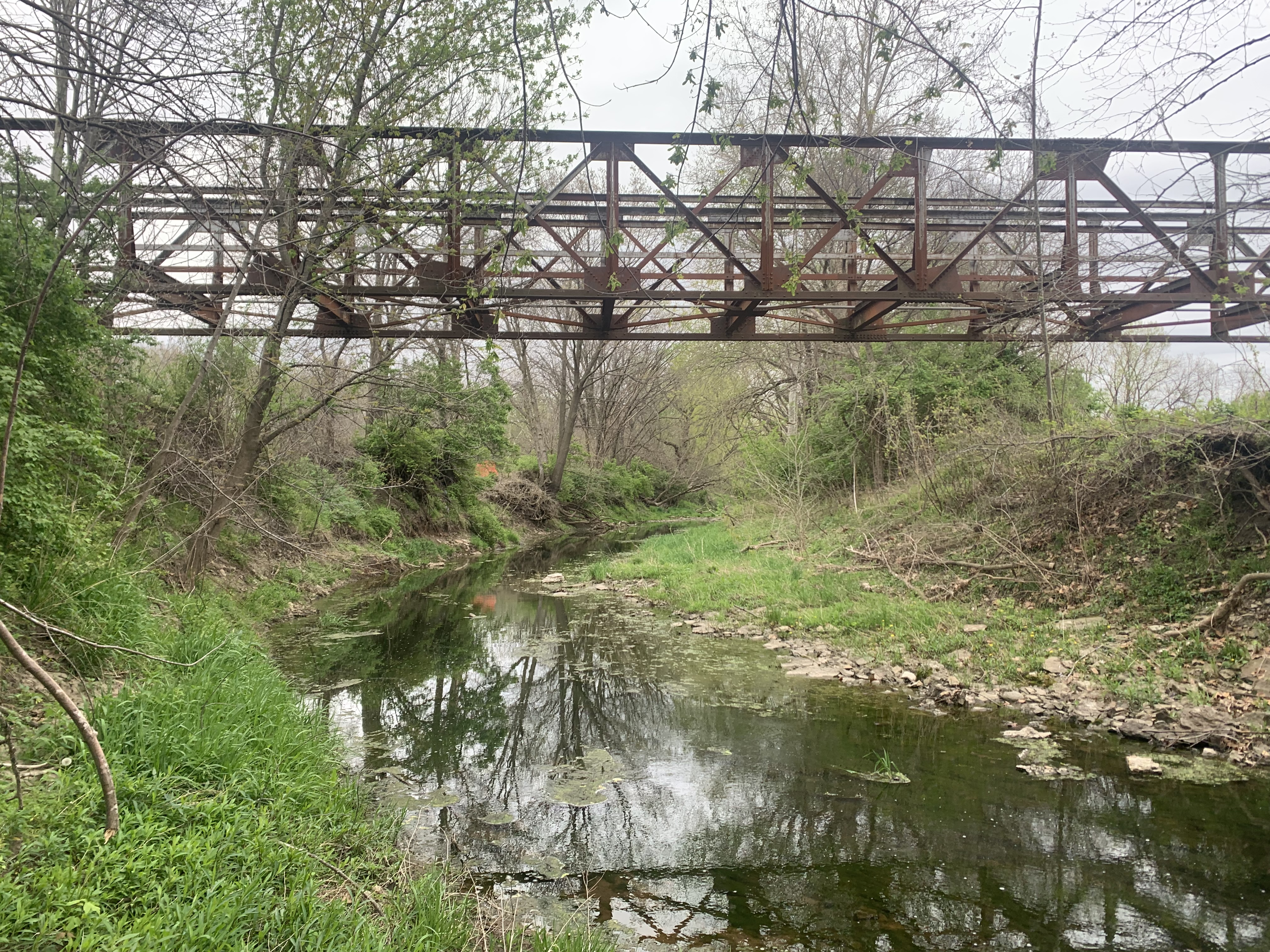
- Horse Fork at old bridge in Grafton Memorial Park in Plattsburg

Location
- Country: United States
- State: Missouri
- County: Clinton and Clinton

Physical characteristics
- Source
  - location: Platte Township, Clinton County
  - coordinates: 39°40′27″N 94°25′51″W
  - elevation: 1,020 ft (310 m)
- Mouth: Little Platte River
  - location: Concord Township, Clinton County
  - coordinates: 39°33′47″N 94°26′26″W
  - elevation: 886 ft (270 m)
- Length: 12.0 mi (19.3 km)

Basin features
- Progression: Horse Fork → Little Platte River → Platte River → Missouri River → Mississippi River → Atlantic Ocean

Horse Fork is a stream in Clinton County in the U.S. state of Missouri. It is a tributary of the Little Platte River and is 12.0 miles (19.3 km) long.

According to the State Historical Society of Missouri, Horse Fork may have been named for a horse-powered gristmill near its banks. The source is in the center-north of Clinton County, about 2.5 miles northeast of the extinct town of Delaney. The stream runs southerly, passes east just outside of Plattsburg, and joins the Little Tarkio River.

There is one named tributary of this stream called Reservoir Branch which flows through the Plattsburg Old Reservoir and the Six Mile Lane Lake north of Plattsburg.

== See also ==
- Tributaries of the Little Platte River
- List of rivers of Missouri
