= Roberts Branch =

Roberts Branch may refer to:

- Roberts Branch (Clinton County, Missouri), a stream in Missouri
- Roberts Branch (Osage River), a stream in Missouri
- N. Robert Branch, American economist
