= Owens Branch (Little Platte River tributary) =

Stream in northwest Missouri, U.S.

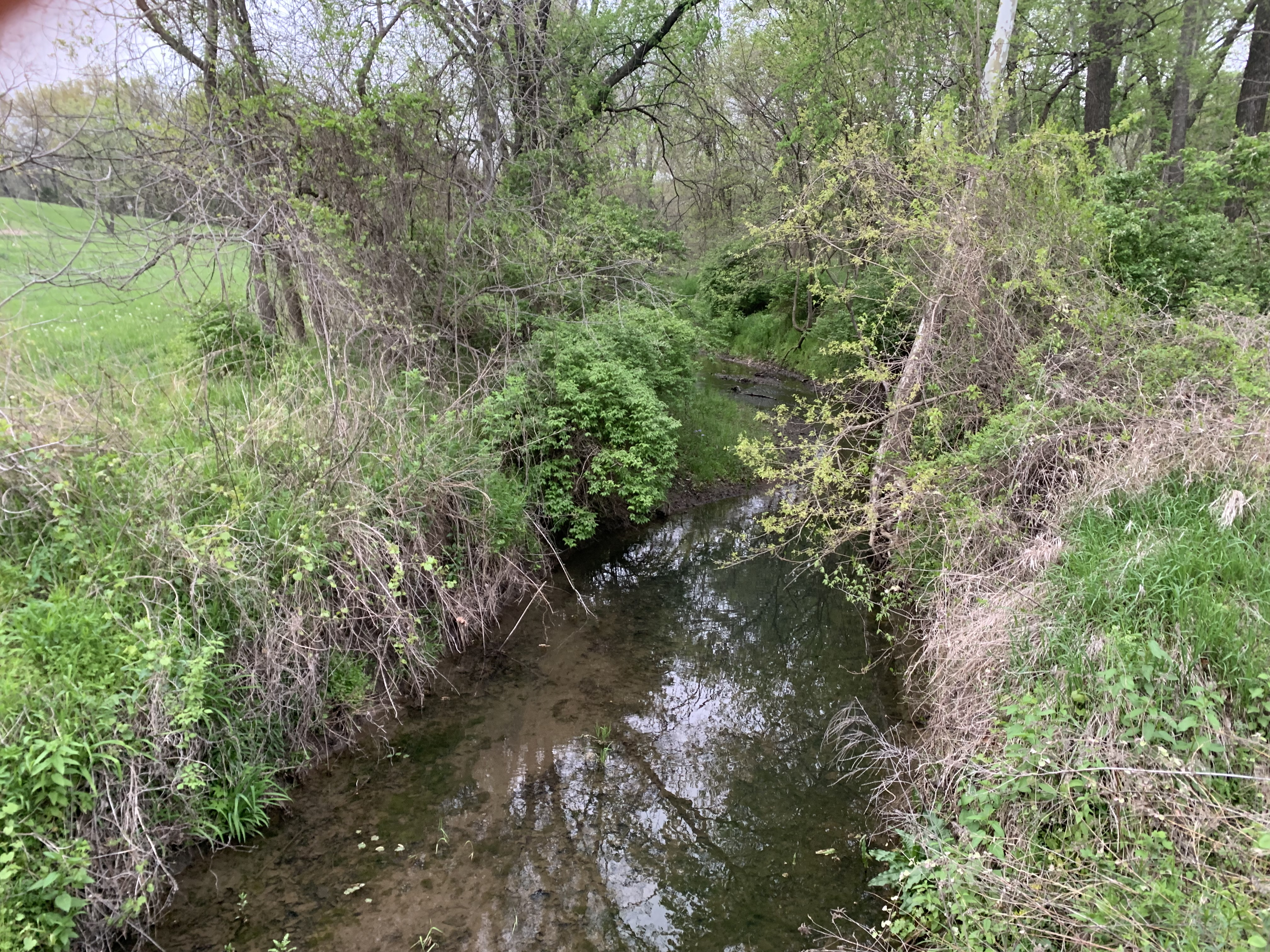
- Owens Branch at Route KK bridge in Smithville

Location
- Country: United States
- State: Missouri
- County: Clay

Physical characteristics
- Source
  - location: Platte Township, Clay County
  - coordinates: 39°26′06″N 94°35′15″W
  - elevation: 950 ft (290 m)
- Mouth: Little Platte River
  - location: Platte Township, Clay County
  - coordinates: 39°23′35″N 94°35′16″W
  - elevation: 797 ft (243 m)
- Length: 4.5 mi (7.2 km)

Basin features
- Progression: Owens Branch → Little Platte River → Platte River → Missouri River → Mississippi River → Atlantic Ocean

Owens Branch is a stream in Clay County in the U.S. state of Missouri. It is a tributary of the Little Platte River and is 4.5 miles (7.2 km) long.

The stream flows north to south through Smithville before depositing into the Little Platte River.

Owens Branch has the name of John Cross Owens, an early settler. A late, 19th-century map denotes the stream as Owen Branch.

== See also ==
- Tributaries of the Little Platte River
- List of rivers of Missouri
