= Owens Branch =

Owens Branch may refer to the following streams in the United States:

- Owens Branch (West Branch Gum Branch tributary), a stream in Delaware
- Owens Branch (Little Platte River tributary), a stream in Missouri
- Owens Branch (Ararat River tributary), a stream in Virginia

== See also ==
- Owens (disambiguation)
