= Smith Fork =

Smith Fork may refer to:

- Smith Fork (Colorado), a tributary of the Gunnison River
- Smith Fork (Missouri), a tributary of the Little Platte River
- Smith Fork (Tennessee), a tributary of Indian Creek in Tennessee
- Smith Fork Creek, a tributary of Caney Fork River in Tennessee
