= Holtzclaw Creek =

Stream in northwest Missouri, U.S.

Location
- Country: United States
- State: Missouri
- County: Clay

Physical characteristics
- Source
  - location: Platte Township, Clay County
  - coordinates: 39°22′18″N 94°29′01″W
  - elevation: 920 ft (280 m)
- Mouth: Smithville Lake
  - location: Platte Township, Clay County
  - coordinates: 39°25′03″N 94°27′58″W
  - elevation: 863 ft (263 m)
- Length: 4.9 mi (7.9 km)

Basin features
- Progression: Holtzclaw Creek → Camp Branch → Little Platte River → Platte River → Missouri River → Mississippi River → Atlantic Ocean

Holtzclaw Creek is a stream in Clay County in the U.S. state of Missouri. It is an indirect tributary of the Little Platte River via Camp Branch, and is 4.9 miles (7.9 km) long.

Holtzclaw Creek has the name of the local Holtzclaw family.

== See also ==
- Tributaries of the Little Platte River
- List of rivers of Missouri
