= Roberts Branch (Linn Branch tributary) =

Stream in northwest Missouri, U.S.

Location
- Country: United States
- State: Missouri
- County: Clinton

Physical characteristics
- Source
  - location: Concord Township, Clinton County
  - coordinates: 39°37′26″N 94°27′41″W
  - elevation: 1,020 ft (310 m)
- Mouth: Linn Branch
  - location: Hardin Township, Clinton County
  - coordinates: 39°29′13″N 94°31′56″W
  - elevation: 860 ft (260 m)
- Length: 13.2 mi (21.2 km)

Basin features
- Progression: Roberts Branch → Linn Branch → Little Platte River → Platte River → Missouri River → Mississippi River → Atlantic Ocean

Roberts Branch is a stream in Clinton County in the U.S. state of Missouri. It is an indirect tributary of the Little Platte River via Linn Branch. The stream is 13.2 miles (21.2 km) long.

The community of Mecca was on the floodplain of the Little Platte River and is currently on the shore of the reservoir approximately one half-mile to the southeast of the confluence on Missouri Route D.

Roberts Branch was named after Littleton Roberts, a pioneer citizen.

Some older maps transpose Roberts Branch with Linn Branch and have Linn Branch be a tributary of Roberts Branch.

== See also ==
- Tributaries of the Little Platte River
- List of rivers of Missouri
