= Atchison Township =

Atchison Township is the name of two townships in the U.S. state of Missouri:

- Atchison Township, Clinton County, Missouri
- Atchison Township, Nodaway County, Missouri
