= Polecat Creek (Wilkerson Creek tributary) =

Stream in northwest Missouri, U.S.

Location
- Country: United States
- State: Missouri
- County: Clay

Physical characteristics
- Source
  - location: Platte Township, Clay County
  - coordinates: 39°20′05″N 94°30′01″W
  - elevation: 1,020 ft (310 m)
- Mouth: Wilkerson Creek
  - location: Platte Township, Clay County
  - coordinates: 39°20′17″N 94°32′22″W
  - elevation: 869 ft (265 m)
- Length: 2.7 mi (4.3 km)

Basin features
- Progression: Polecat Creek → Wilkerson Creek → Little Platte River → Platte River → Missouri River → Mississippi River → Atlantic Ocean

Polecat Creek is a stream in Clay County in the U.S. state of Missouri. It is an indirect tributary of the Little Platte River via Wilkerson Creek, and is 2.7 miles long.

Polecat Creek was named for the polecats which roamed along its course.

== See also ==
- Tributaries of the Little Platte River
- List of rivers of Missouri
