= Little Platte River =

River in Missouri, U.S.

Little Platte River Smith Creek
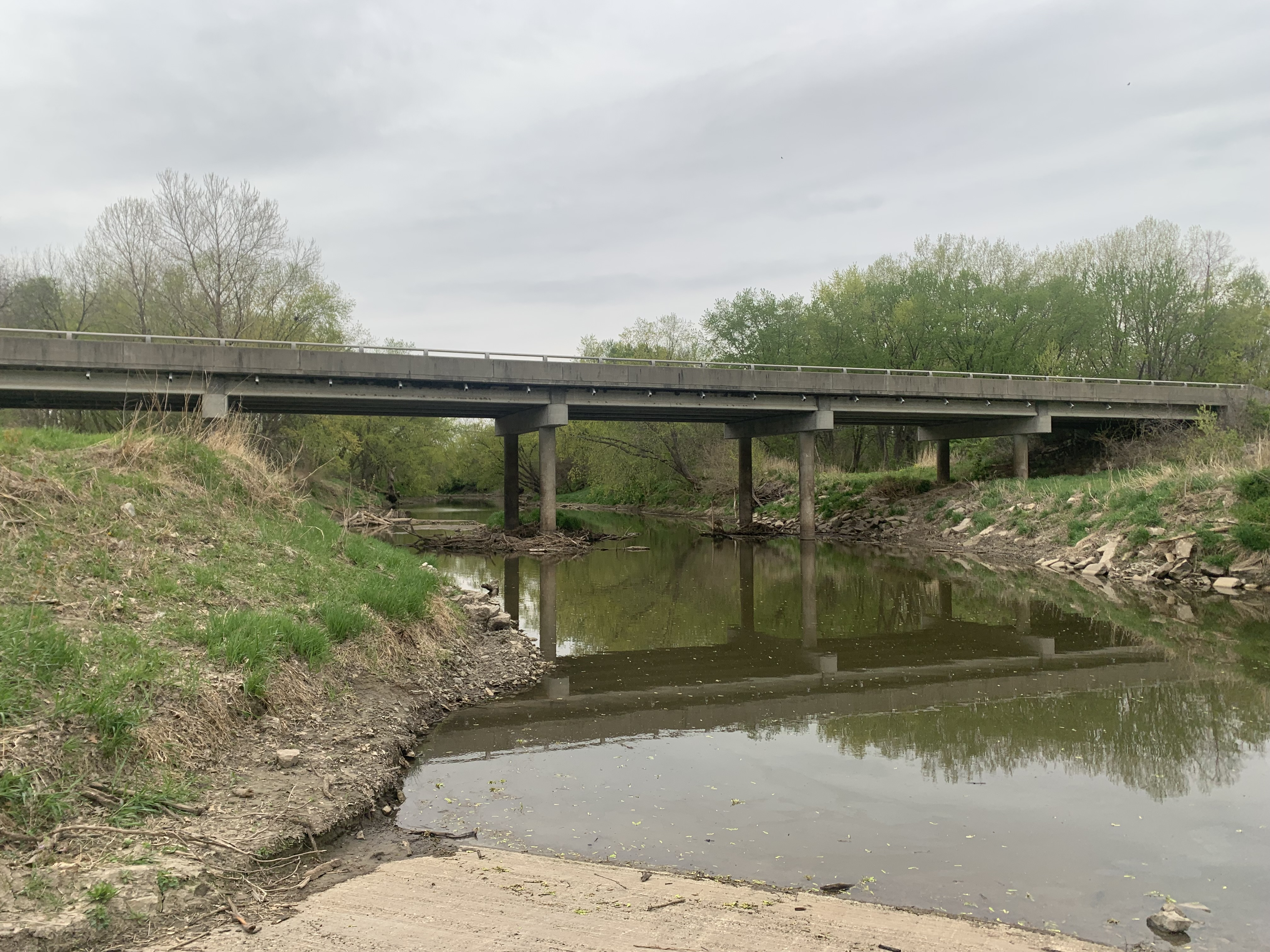
- Missouri Route C bridge of the Little Platte River at Plattsburg Boat Ramp

Location
- Country: United States
- State: Missouri
- County: DeKalb, Platte, Clay, and Clinton

Physical characteristics
- Source
  - location: Colfax Township, DeKalb County
  - coordinates: 39°46′32″N 94°24′28″W
  - elevation: 1,050 ft (320 m)
- Mouth: Platte River
  - location: Carroll Township, Platte County
  - coordinates: 39°23′53″N 94°41′28″W
  - elevation: 774 ft (236 m)
- Length: 66.4 mi (106.9 km)
- Discharge
  - location: Smithville, Missouri
  - average: 179 cu ft/s (5.1 m^{3}/s)

Basin features
- Progression: Little Platte River → Platte River → Missouri River → Mississippi River → Atlantic Ocean

The Little Platte River is a river in the northwest Missouri, United States. It is a major tributary of Platte River and is 66.4 miles long, which makes it its second longest tributary. The river is the primary inflow for Smithville Lake and is its outflow before joining the Platte River. The stream is monitored at two locations, at Smithville. and just upstream from Plattsburg.

== Etymology ==
The Little Platte River was historically known as Smith Creek from to Humphrey Smith's mill, at Smithville. By the 20th Century, it was referred to as the Little Platte.

== Geography ==
=== Course ===
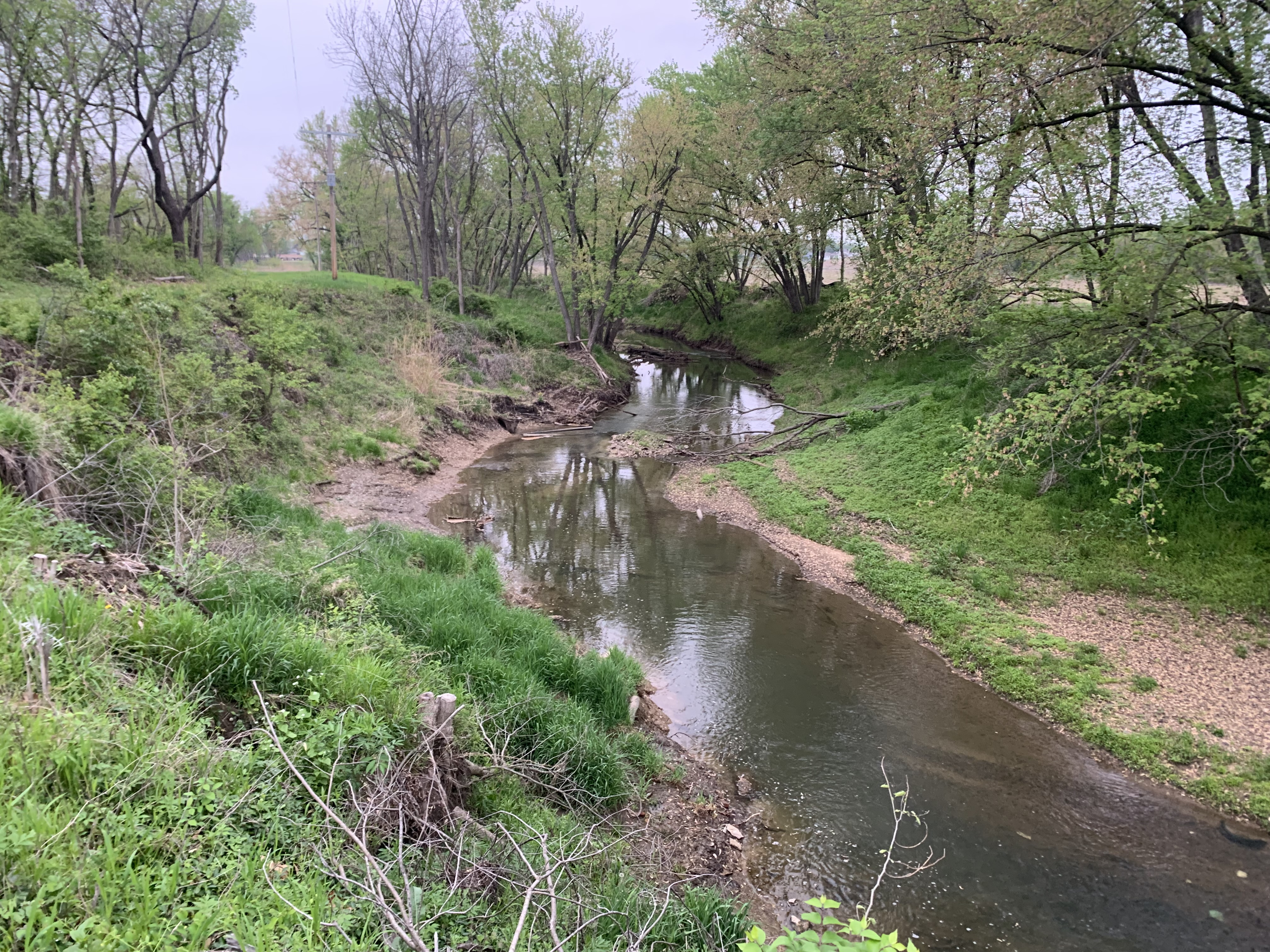
Little Platte River in Smithville, Missouri along Route DD, downstream of Smithville Lake

The Little Platte River headwaters in southern Dekalb County just south of Pony Express Lake and flows southerly across US Highway 36 and west of Osborn. After traveling south through half of Clinton, it flows through the Hartell Conservation Area before crossing Missouri Route 116 and entering Plattsburg. A few local lakes and many tributaries flow into Little Platte around Plattsburg, and it passes south and east of the town. It heads southwest a few more miles before becoming the northern stretches of Smithville Lake.

The stream flows over 10 miles through the large reservoir before reaching the dam. The Little Platte River is joined by 11 named tributaries and countless unnamed ones along this stretch. Additionally, the river enters Clay County while part of the reservoir. After flowing out from the Smithville Lake Dam, it flows through Smithville and continues west. Various tributaries from the northern Kansas City metropolitan area flow into it along its 6-mile course westward before depositing into the Platte River in Platte County.

=== Hydrology ===
The Little Platte River is the second largest watershed in Clay County, after the Fishing River.

=== Tributaries ===
There are 25 named direct and indirect tributaries to the Little Platte River.

==== Clinton County ====
- Rock Branch
- Lingenfelter Branch
- Linn Branch
  - Roberts Branch
- Funkhouser Creek
- Horse Fork
  - Reservoir Branch
- Grindstone Creek
- Smith Fork

==== Clay County ====
- Owens Branch
- Second Creek
  - First Creek
- Wilkerson Creek
  - Rocky Branch
  - Polecat Creek
- Crows Creek or Crows Branch
- Mitchell Branch
- Camp Branch
  - Owl Creek
  - Holtzclaw Creek
- Eberts Branch
- Owl Creek
  - Eberts Branch
- Duncan Branch

==== Platte County ====
- Muddy Branch
- Todd Creek
  - Wildcat Branch

== See also ==
- Tributaries of the Platte River
- List of rivers of Missouri
