= Aker Cemetery =

Cemetery in Missouri, U.S.

- U.S. National Register of Historic Places
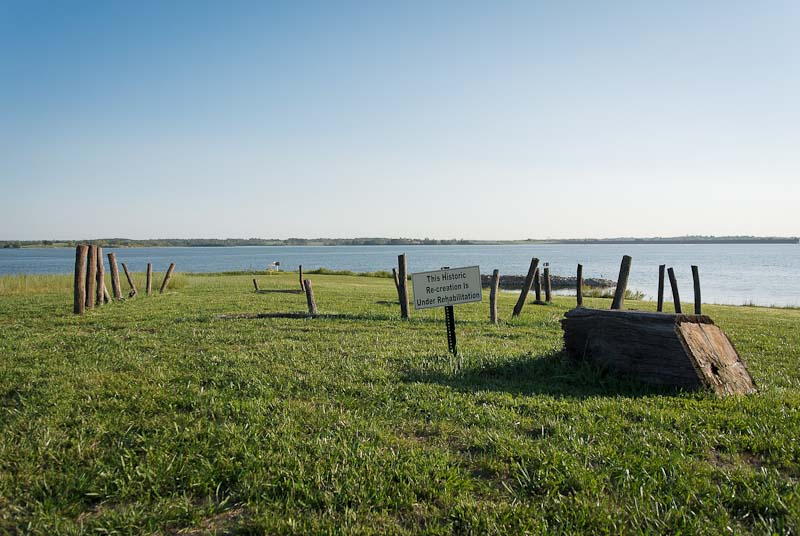
- Aker Cemetery, September 2012

- Location within Missouri Location within the United States
- Location: Northeast of Smithville off MO W, Smithville, Missouri
- Coordinates: 39°24′40″N 94°32′44″W
- Area: 0.5 acres (0.20 ha)
- Built: c. 1835
- NRHP reference No.: 74001071
- Added to NRHP: November 13, 1974

Aker Cemetery is a historic cemetery located near Smithville, Missouri. The Aker Cemetery is the only remaining evidence of the initial settlers in the area. It was established about 1835, and contains 10 marked gravesites dated from 1835 to 1882, and a total of 25 graves.

It was listed on the National Register of Historic Places in 1974.
