= Smith Fork (Little Platte River tributary) =

Stream in northwest Missouri, U.S.

Location
- Country: United States
- State: Missouri
- County: Clinton

Physical characteristics
- Source
  - location: Shoal Township, Clinton County
  - coordinates: 39°41′59″N 94°18′55″W
  - elevation: 1,020 ft (310 m)
- Mouth: Little Platte River
  - location: Concord Township, Clinton County
  - coordinates: 39°38′17″N 94°22′26″W
  - elevation: 938 ft (286 m)
- Length: 8.3 mi (13.4 km)

Basin features
- Progression: Smith Fork → Little Platte River → Platte River → Missouri River → Mississippi River → Atlantic Ocean

Smith Fork is a stream in Clinton County in the U.S. state of Missouri. It is a tributary of the Little Platte River and is 8.3 miles (13.4 km) long.

The stream flows southerly from northeastern Clinton County near West Keystone, Missouri to central Clinton County, where it deposits into the Little Platte River.

Smith Fork most likely has the name of William Smith, a pioneer citizen. The original name of the Little Platte River was Smith Creek, though over time the name Smith was only associated with this fork.

== See also ==
- Tributaries of the Little Platte River
- List of rivers of Missouri
