= Todd Creek (Little Platte River tributary) =

Stream in northwest Missouri, U.S.

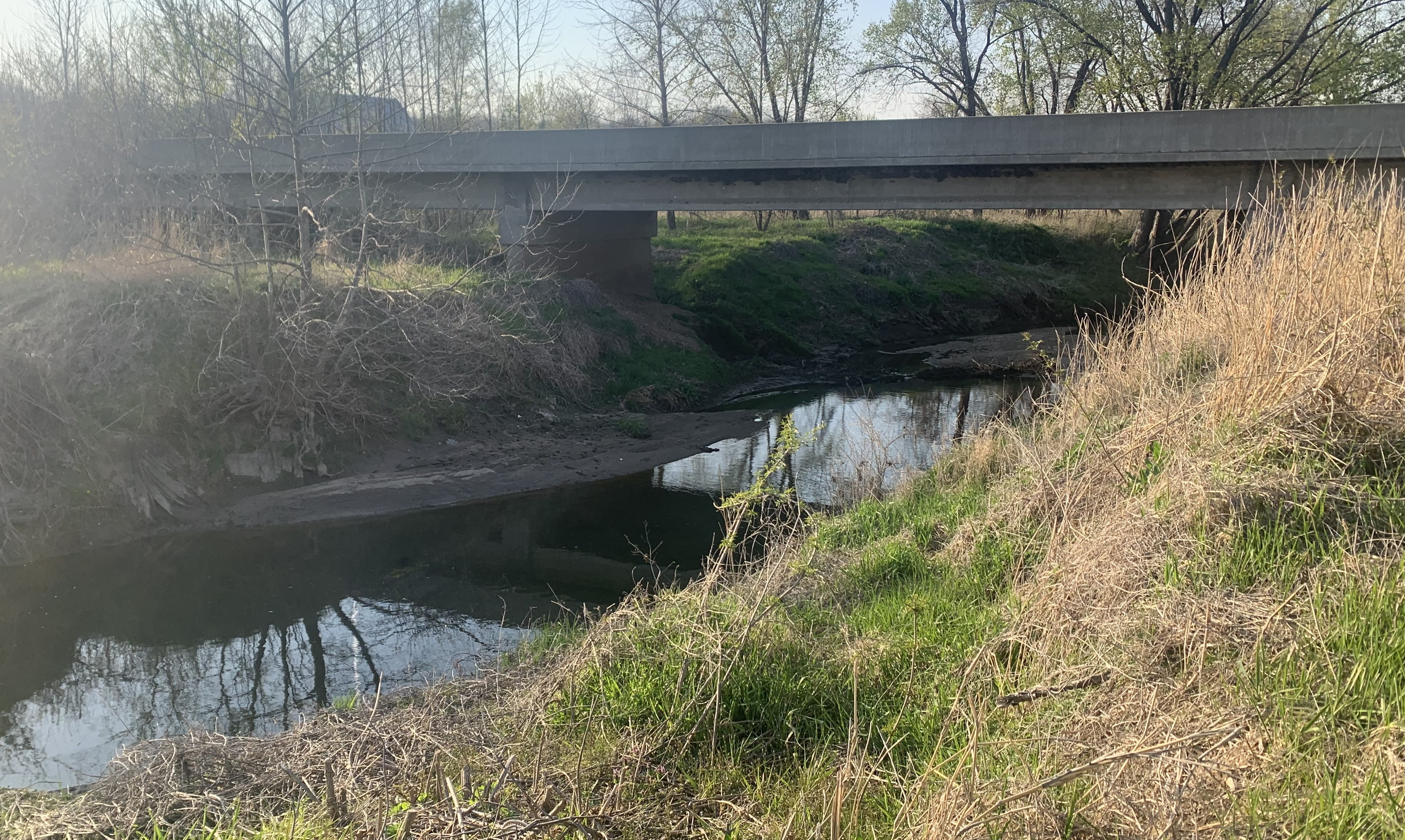
- Todd Creek at Route 92 bridge in Carroll Township

Location
- Country: United States
- State: Missouri
- County: Platte

Physical characteristics
- Source
  - location: May Township, Platte County
  - coordinates: 39°17′38″N 94°41′08″W
  - elevation: 980 ft (300 m)
- Mouth: Little Platte River
  - location: Carroll Township, Platte County
  - coordinates: 39°23′35″N 94°39′18″W
  - elevation: 787 ft (240 m)
- Length: 11.9 mi (19.2 km)

Basin features
- Progression: Todd Creek → Little Platte River → Platte River → Missouri River → Mississippi River → Atlantic Ocean

Todd Creek is a stream in Platte County in the U.S. state of Missouri. It is a tributary of the Little Platte River and is 11.9 miles (19.2 km) long.

Todd Creek has the name of Joseph Todd, a pioneer settler.

The headwaters for this stream are at the Berlin Reservoir at the Kansas City International Airport, and the stream flows northeasterly into the Little Platte River. There is one named tributary of this stream called Wildcat Branch. The city of Ferrelview lies squarely in the middle of the Wildcat Branch watershed.

== See also ==
- Tributaries of the Little Platte River
- List of rivers of Missouri
