= Downtown Smithville Historic District =

Historic district in Missouri, United States

- U.S. National Register of Historic Places
- U.S. Historic district
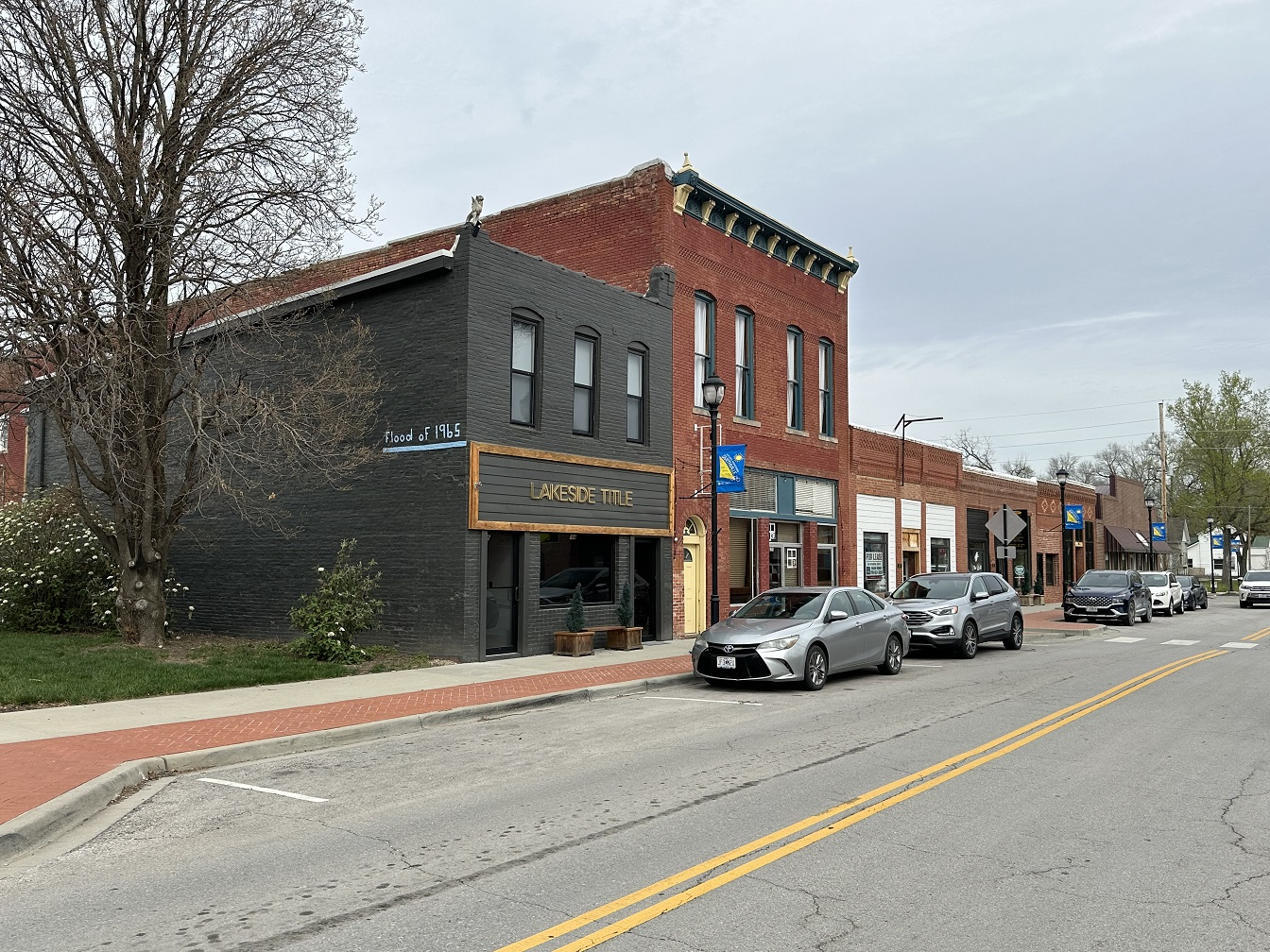

- Location within Missouri Location within the United States
- Location: Roughly bounded by Bridge, Church, Commercial & Meadow Sts., Smithville, Missouri
- Coordinates: 39°23′14″N 94°34′49″W
- Area: 9.3 acres (3.8 ha)
- Built: 1868
- Architectural style: Gothic Revival, Neoclassical
- NRHP reference No.: 14000159
- Added to NRHP: April 21, 2014

Downtown Smithville Historic District is a national historic district located at Smithville, Clay County, Missouri. It encompasses 30 contributing buildings in the central business district of Smithville. The district developed between about 1868 and 1964, and includes representative examples of Gothic Revival and Classical Revival style architecture. Notable buildings include the IOOF Lodge Hall / Smithville City Hall (c. 1890), C.C. Kindred Motor Company (c. 1910), The State Theater (c. 1910), Masonic Hall (c. 1905), First Christian Church (1927), Bank of Smithville / Citizens Bank and Trust (1889), Post Office (c. 1890), Methodist Episcopal Church (c. 1925), Smithville Community Hospital (1936), and Standard Service Station (c. 1935).

It was listed on the National Register of Historic Places in 2014.
