= Clinton Township, Clinton County, Missouri =

Township in Clinton County, Missouri, U.S.

Clinton Township
- Township
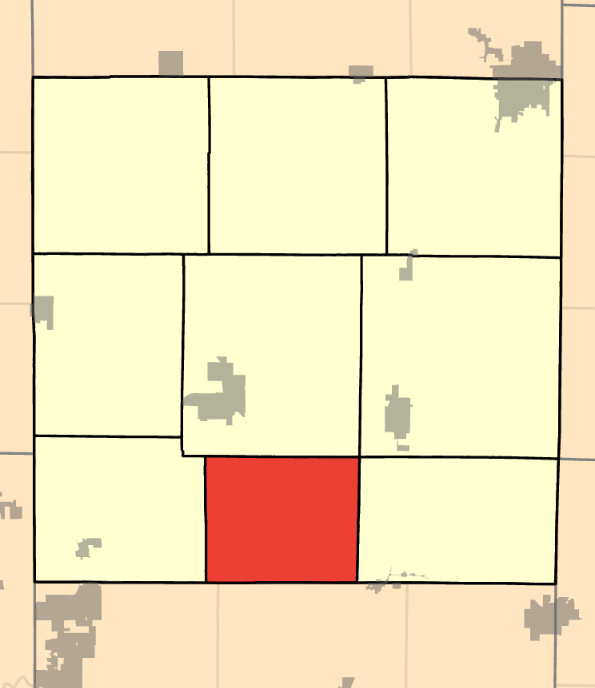
- Coordinates: 39°29′24″N 94°24′45″W
- Country: United States
- State: Missouri
- County: Clinton

Area
  - Total: 30.7 sq mi (80 km^{2})
  - Land: 30.69 sq mi (79.5 km^{2})
  - Water: 0.01 sq mi (0.026 km^{2}) 0.03%
- Elevation: 1,056 ft (322 m)

Population (2020)
  - Total: 793
  - Density: 25.8/sq mi (10.0/km^{2})
- FIPS code: 29-04914950
- GNIS feature ID: 766512

Clinton Township is a township in Clinton County, Missouri, United States. At the 2020 census, its population was 793.

Clinton Township was erected in 1871, taking its name from Clinton County.
