= Roberts Branch (Osage River tributary) =

Stream in the American state of Missouri

Coordinates: 38.27836°N 93.07353°W

Roberts Branch is a stream in Morgan County in the U.S. state of Missouri. It is a tributary of Osage River.

Roberts Branch has the name of the original owner of the site.

== See also ==
- List of rivers of Missouri
