= Humphrey "Yankee" Smith =

Humphrey Smith commonly known in his lifetime as "Yankee" Smith (1774 in New Jersey – May 5, 1857 in Clay County, Missouri) was the unofficial founder of the city of Smithville, Missouri, and a figure in the history of the State of Missouri.

== Smith in Missouri History ==
In regional hyperbole of the time, Smith was known as the "only" Yankee (Federalist or "Union sympathizer") in Clay County, Missouri, a key section of the far-flung Kansas City Metropolitan Area, location of many sites and incidents relative to the eventual American Civil War. "Yankee" Smith is described thus in the section about Smithville in an Encyclopedia of the History of Missouri published in 1901:

Smithville ... takes its name from the first settler on the site, Humphrey Smith, better known as "Yankee" Smith, who located there in 1822, and two years later built Smith's mill on the fork of Platte River. He came from New Jersey to Missouri in 1816, and lived first in Howard County, afterward in Chariton County, and in 1822 removed to Clay County. He was an outspoken abolitionist, and frequently provoked the resentment of the pro-slavery community in which he lived, but his uprightness, enterprise and public spirit won the respect of his neightors, and his non-resistance, maintained at all times under the greatest provocations, finally secured him exemption from personal violence. He was accustomed to tell the people about him that slavery would be abolished in the United States, little as they were inclined to believe it. He died in 1857 at the age of eighty-three years. His tombstone bears this epitaph:

Here lies Humphrey Smith, who was in favor of human rights, universal liberty, equal and exact justice, no union with slave holders, free States, free people, union of States and one universal republic.

A passage in the 1907 autobiography by Humphrey Smith's son, Calvin Smith (b. December 23, 1813 Erie County, New York - d. October 1, 1909, Kansas City, Missouri) expands on that explanation of Humphrey Smith's activism and points out the epitaph was not engraved until after the American Civil War. This portion of Calvin Smith's book is evidently engraved on his father's tombstone with only slight modification:

This patriot came to Missouri in 1816 from the State of New York, and labored to make that territory a free State, by which he was mobbed by armed slave-holders; scourged, bruised and dragged at midnight from his house. His ever-faithful wife, coming to his assistance, received injuries at the hands of the mob which caused her years of affliction and the loss of one eye. He was compelled to leave ... His family fled from Howard County to Carroll County, Missouri, and he, joining them there, moved to Clay County, where for many years he kept up the struggle against the negro-thieves or man-stealers. They denounced him as Abolitionist, because he was in favor of human liberty for all. His request was "never let the [men-stealers] know where I am buried until my State is free; then write my epitaph. ...

While no photograph of Humphrey Smith may be extant, a photograph of "four generations" of male descendants (Calvin Smith >> Erastus Smith >> Jewel Smith >> Delwin Smith) is included on page 24 of Calvin Smith's 1907 autobiography.
