= Smithville, Missouri =

City in Clay and Platte counties in Missouri, United States

- City
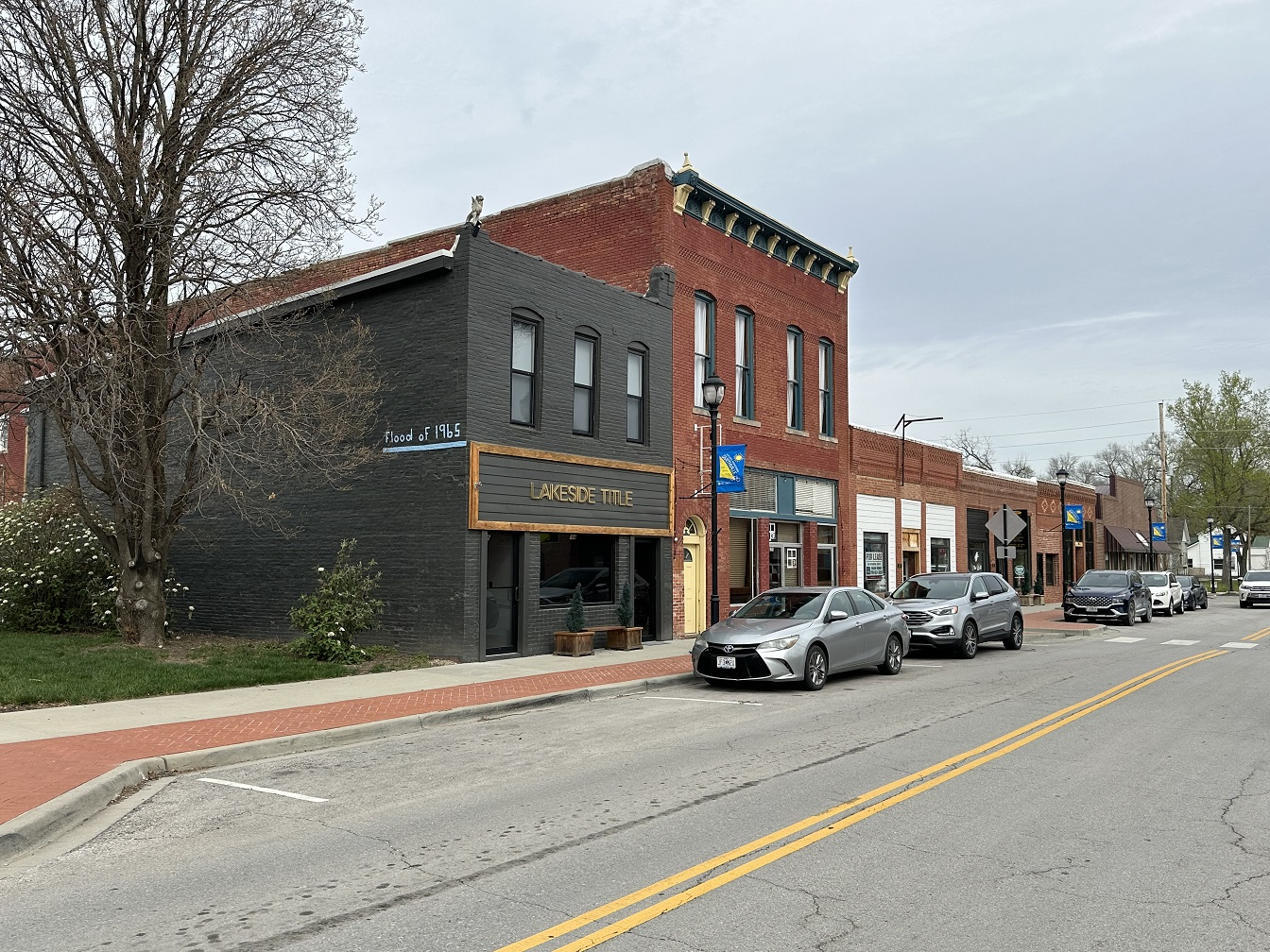

- Location of Smithville, Missouri
- Coordinates: 39°23′32″N 94°34′30″W
- Country: United States
- State: Missouri
- Counties: Clay, Platte
- Incorporated: 1867

Government
  - Mayor: Damien Boley

Area
  - Total: 16.26 sq mi (42.12 km^{2})
  - Land: 16.15 sq mi (41.84 km^{2})
  - Water: 0.11 sq mi (0.28 km^{2})
- Elevation: 814 ft (248 m)

Population (2020)
  - Total: 10,406
  - Density: 644.2/sq mi (248.71/km^{2})
- Time zone: UTC-6 (Central (CST))
  - Summer (DST): UTC-5 (CDT)
- ZIP code: 64089
- Area codes: 816, 975
- FIPS code: 29-68420
- GNIS feature ID: 2395903
- Website: www.smithvillemo.org

Smithville is a city along the Little Platte River in Clay and Platte counties in Missouri, United States, that is part of the Kansas City metropolitan area. The population was 10,406 at the 2020 United States census. Smithville is also known for the Smithville Lake.

== History ==
Smithville is named after Humphrey "Yankee" Smith (1774 – May 5, 1857) after he settled at the site in 1822. The town was originally known as "Smith's Mill" but ultimately became "Smithville" as it was easier to pronounce. Another reputed history behind the name is that it was going to be named Smith's Mill, but there was already another current settlement in Missouri with the same name so it was altered slightly to differentiate it.

Silver Screen stars Wallace Beery and Noah Beery, Sr. were born and raised near Smithville.

The Aker Cemetery and Downtown Smithville Historic District are listed on the National Register of Historic Places.

== Demographics ==
Historical population
Census	Pop.	Note	%±
1880	231		—
1890	372		61.0%
1900	427		14.8%
1910	680		59.3%
1920	782		15.0%
1930	902		15.3%
1940	772		−14.4%
1950	947		22.7%
1960	1,254		32.4%
1970	1,785		42.3%
1980	1,873		4.9%
1990	2,525		34.8%
2000	5,514		118.4%
2010	8,425		52.8%
2020	10,406		23.5%
U.S. Decennial Census

=== Racial and ethnic composition ===
Smithville city, Missouri – Racial and ethnic composition Note: the US Census treats Hispanic/Latino as an ethnic category. This table excludes Latinos from the racial categories and assigns them to a separate category. Hispanics/Latinos may be of any race.
Race / Ethnicity (NH = Non-Hispanic)	Pop 2000	Pop 2010	Pop 2020	% 2000	% 2010	% 2020
White alone (NH)	5,293	7,924	9,330	95.99%	94.05%	89.66%
Black or African American alone (NH)	12	51	74	0.22%	0.61%	0.71%
Native American or Alaska Native alone (NH)	24	40	48	0.44%	0.47%	0.46%
Asian alone (NH)	21	55	66	0.38%	0.65%	0.63%
Native Hawaiian or Pacific Islander alone (NH)	6	3	11	0.11%	0.04%	0.11%
Other race alone (NH)	16	2	36	0.29%	0.02%	0.35%
Mixed race or Multiracial (NH)	34	130	480	0.62%	1.54%	4.61%
Hispanic or Latino (any race)	108	220	361	1.96%	2.61%	3.47%
Total	5,514	8,425	10,406	100.00%	100.00%	100.00%

=== 2020 census ===
As of the 2020 census, Smithville had a population of 10,406, including 3,866 households and 2,864 families.

The median age was 37.5 years. 27.4% of residents were under the age of 18 and 13.0% were 65 years of age or older. For every 100 females, there were 97.9 males, and for every 100 females age 18 and over, there were 95.1 males age 18 and over.

92.3% of residents lived in urban areas, while 7.7% lived in rural areas.

There were 4,033 housing units, of which 4.1% were vacant. The homeowner vacancy rate was 1.1% and the rental vacancy rate was 9.3%.

Of the 3,866 households, 39.5% had children under the age of 18 living in them. 58.1% were married-couple households, 14.1% were households with a male householder and no spouse or partner present, and 20.6% were households with a female householder and no spouse or partner present. About 21.7% of all households were made up of individuals, and 9.8% had someone living alone who was 65 years of age or older. The average household size was 2.8 and the average family size was 3.1.

Racial composition as of the 2020 census
Race	Number	Percent
White	9,446	90.8%
Black or African American	75	0.7%
American Indian and Alaska Native	56	0.5%
Asian	67	0.6%
Native Hawaiian and Other Pacific Islander	11	0.1%
Some other race	85	0.8%
Two or more races	666	6.4%

=== Income and poverty ===
The 2016–2020 5-year American Community Survey estimates show that the median household income was $83,400 (with a margin of error of +/- $3,840) and the median family income was $92,279 (+/- $8,943). Males had a median income of $43,881 (+/- $4,109) versus $34,508 (+/- $5,507) for females. The median income for those above 16 years old was $40,012 (+/- $2,416). Approximately, 2.7% of families and 6.1% of the population were below the poverty line, including 12.8% of those under the age of 18 and 10.0% of those ages 65 or over.

=== 2010 census ===
As of the census of 2010, there were 8,425 people, 3,115 households, and 2,321 families living in the city. The population density was 541.5 inhabitants per square mile (209.1/km^{2}). There were 3,280 housing units at an average density of 210.8 per square mile (81.4/km^{2}). The racial makeup of the city was 96.0% White, 0.7% African American, 0.5% Native American, 0.7% Asian, 0.4% from other races, and 1.7% from two or more races. Hispanic or Latino of any race were 2.6% of the population.

There were 3,115 households, of which 142.0% had children under the age of 18 living with them, 61.0% were married couples living together, 9.1% had a female householder with no husband present, 4.5% had a male householder with no wife present, and 25.5% were non-families. 21.9% of all households were made up of individuals, and 8.4% had someone living alone who was 65 years of age or older. The average household size was 12.68 and the average family size was 3.13.

The median age in the city was 36.9 years. 29% of residents were under the age of 18; 5.9% were between the ages of 18 and 24; 29.3% were from 25 to 44; 25.8% were from 45 to 64; and 10.2% were 65 years of age or older. The gender makeup of the city was 49.0% male and 51.0% female.

=== 2000 census ===
As of the census of 2000, there were 5,514 people, 2,067 households, and 1,529 families living in the city. The population density was 402.1 inhabitants per square mile (155.3/km^{2}). There were 2,220 housing units at an average density of 161.9 per square mile (62.5/km^{2}). The racial makeup of the city was 97.23% White, 0.22% African American, 0.45% Native American, 0.38% Asian, 0.11% Pacific Islander, 0.67% from other races, and 0.94% from two or more races. Hispanic or Latino of any race were 1.96% of the population.

There were 2,067 households, out of which 41.0% had children under the age of 18 living with them, 62.7% were married couples living together, 8.8% had a female householder with no husband present, and 26.0% were non-families. 22.4% of all households were made up of individuals, and 8.6% had someone living alone who was 65 years of age or older. The average household size was 2.62 and the average family size was 3.07.

In the city, the population was spread out, with 28.4% under the age of 18, 6.6% from 18 to 24, 34.3% from 25 to 44, 19.2% from 45 to 64, and 11.6% who were 65 years of age or older. The median age was 34 years. For every 100 females, there were 91.7 males. For every 100 females age 18 and over, there were 89.7 males.

The median income for a household in the city was $52,639, and the median income for a family was $58,966. Males had a median income of $42,388 versus $29,150 for females. The per capita income for the city was $22,669. About 2.5% of families and 4.0% of the population were below the poverty line, including 4.0% of those under age 18 and

== Geography ==
Smithville is located in western Clay County on the Little Platte River. The Little Platte is dammed just east of the city to form the Smithville Reservoir. U.S. Route 169 passes the west side of the city.

According to the United States Census Bureau, the city has a total area of 15.67 square miles (40.59 km^{2}), of which 15.56 square miles (40.30 km^{2}) is land and 0.11 square miles (0.28 km^{2}) is water.

=== Climate ===
According to the Köppen Climate Classification system, Smithville has a humid subtropical climate, abbreviated "Cfa" on climate maps. The hottest temperature recorded in Smithville was 107 °F (41.7 °C) on August 9, 1988, while the coldest temperature recorded was −26 °F (−32.2 °C) on December 23, 1989 and February 16, 2021.

Climate data for Smithville, Missouri (Smithville Lake), 1991–2020 normals, extremes 1985–present
Month	Jan	Feb	Mar	Apr	May	Jun	Jul	Aug	Sep	Oct	Nov	Dec	Year
Record high °F (°C)	72 (22)	76 (24)	86 (30)	92 (33)	93 (34)	103 (39)	104 (40)	107 (42)	104 (40)	92 (33)	80 (27)	73 (23)	107 (42)
Mean maximum °F (°C)	60.8 (16.0)	66.2 (19.0)	76.6 (24.8)	82.9 (28.3)	87.7 (30.9)	92.7 (33.7)	97.1 (36.2)	97.0 (36.1)	92.0 (33.3)	84.6 (29.2)	69.4 (20.8)	62.4 (16.9)	98.7 (37.1)
Mean daily maximum °F (°C)	36.3 (2.4)	41.7 (5.4)	52.6 (11.4)	63.6 (17.6)	72.8 (22.7)	82.2 (27.9)	86.5 (30.3)	85.3 (29.6)	77.8 (25.4)	66.1 (18.9)	53.3 (11.8)	41.6 (5.3)	63.3 (17.4)
Daily mean °F (°C)	26.3 (−3.2)	31.2 (−0.4)	42.0 (5.6)	52.4 (11.3)	62.9 (17.2)	72.7 (22.6)	77.1 (25.1)	75.5 (24.2)	67.0 (19.4)	54.8 (12.7)	42.3 (5.7)	31.8 (−0.1)	53.0 (11.7)
Mean daily minimum °F (°C)	16.3 (−8.7)	20.7 (−6.3)	31.3 (−0.4)	41.2 (5.1)	53.0 (11.7)	63.2 (17.3)	67.6 (19.8)	65.7 (18.7)	56.2 (13.4)	43.5 (6.4)	31.3 (−0.4)	22.1 (−5.5)	42.7 (5.9)
Mean minimum °F (°C)	−3.1 (−19.5)	2.9 (−16.2)	13.8 (−10.1)	26.6 (−3.0)	38.0 (3.3)	50.8 (10.4)	57.3 (14.1)	55.6 (13.1)	40.6 (4.8)	26.9 (−2.8)	16.5 (−8.6)	4.5 (−15.3)	−6.2 (−21.2)
Record low °F (°C)	−20 (−29)	−26 (−32)	−9 (−23)	8 (−13)	28 (−2)	41 (5)	47 (8)	41 (5)	29 (−2)	14 (−10)	−3 (−19)	−26 (−32)	−26 (−32)
Average precipitation inches (mm)	1.15 (29)	1.40 (36)	2.29 (58)	3.85 (98)	5.38 (137)	5.27 (134)	4.87 (124)	4.36 (111)	4.30 (109)	3.47 (88)	2.10 (53)	1.59 (40)	40.03 (1,017)
Average snowfall inches (cm)	2.6 (6.6)	3.1 (7.9)	0.8 (2.0)	0.1 (0.25)	0.0 (0.0)	0.0 (0.0)	0.0 (0.0)	0.0 (0.0)	0.0 (0.0)	0.2 (0.51)	0.4 (1.0)	2.1 (5.3)	9.3 (23.56)
Average extreme snow depth inches (cm)	3.4 (8.6)	3.6 (9.1)	1.6 (4.1)	0.1 (0.25)	0.0 (0.0)	0.0 (0.0)	0.0 (0.0)	0.0 (0.0)	0.0 (0.0)	0.0 (0.0)	0.3 (0.76)	2.3 (5.8)	5.3 (13)
Average precipitation days (≥ 0.01 in)	5.1	4.9	7.0	10.0	13.8	11.2	9.1	8.8	9.1	8.6	5.1	3.6	96.3
Average snowy days (≥ 0.1 in)	1.7	1.5	0.5	0.1	0.0	0.0	0.0	0.0	0.0	0.1	0.3	1.4	5.6
Source 1: NOAA
Source 2: National Weather Service

6.2% of those age 65 or over.

== Transportation ==
The city is served by 1 U.S. highway, 1 Missouri route, and 3 Missouri Supplemental routes:

- US 169 north-south highway that traverses the entire city. It is an undivided highway in the north half, a stroad in part of the south half, and a divided highway in the southernmost quarter. It continues north to Kansas and south to Kansas City.
- Route 92 is an east-west highway crossing the southern third of the city; it continues west to Platte City and east to Kearney.
- Route F, travels unsigned through the northeast portion of the city as North Bridge Street, East 1st Street, Spelman Drive, and Northeast 172nd Street
- Route DD, also known as Main Street, travels through downtown east towards Smithville Lake
- Route KK, a short route in the northwest of the city

== Education ==
Smithville R-II School District covers the portion in Clay County, that is, the vast majority of the city. It operates three elementary schools, one middle school and Smithville High School.

The portion in Platte County is in the Platte County R-III School District. Platte County High School is that district's comprehensive high school.

Smithville has a public library, a branch of the Mid-Continent Public Library.

== Notable people ==
- Tom Helm, conductor
- Bradford Keeney, therapist
- Jayce Tingler - professional baseball bench coach of the Minnesota Twins
- Kenneth Wilson, member of the Missouri House of Representatives

== See also ==
- List of cities in Missouri
