= Platte Township, Clinton County, Missouri =

Township in Clinton County, Missouri, U.S.

Platte Township
- Township
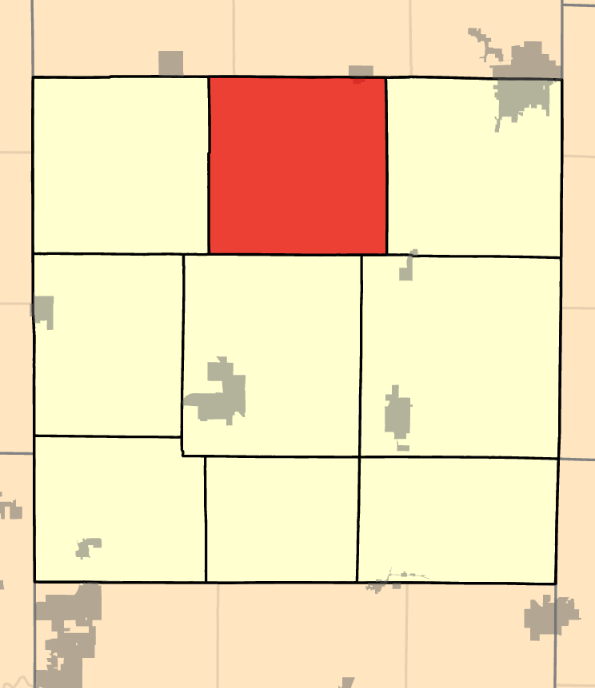
- Coordinates: 39°41′34″N 94°25′03″W
- Country: United States
- State: Missouri
- County: Clinton

Area
  - Total: 50.1 sq mi (130 km^{2})
  - Land: 50.08 sq mi (129.7 km^{2})
  - Water: 0.02 sq mi (0.052 km^{2}) 0.04%
- Elevation: 1,007 ft (307 m)

Population (2020)
  - Total: 349
  - Density: 7/sq mi (2.7/km^{2})
- FIPS code: 29-04958160
- GNIS feature ID: 766518

Platte Township is a township in Clinton County, Missouri, United States. At the 2020 census, its population was 349.

Platte Township was established in 1838, taking its name from the Platte River.
