= Robert Creek (Minnesota) =

Stream in Minnesota, U.S.

Coordinates: 44°37′44″N 93°47′33″W

Robert Creek is a stream in the U.S. state of Minnesota.

Robert Creek was named for Captain Louis Robert, an Indian trader.
