= Plattsburg, Missouri =

- City
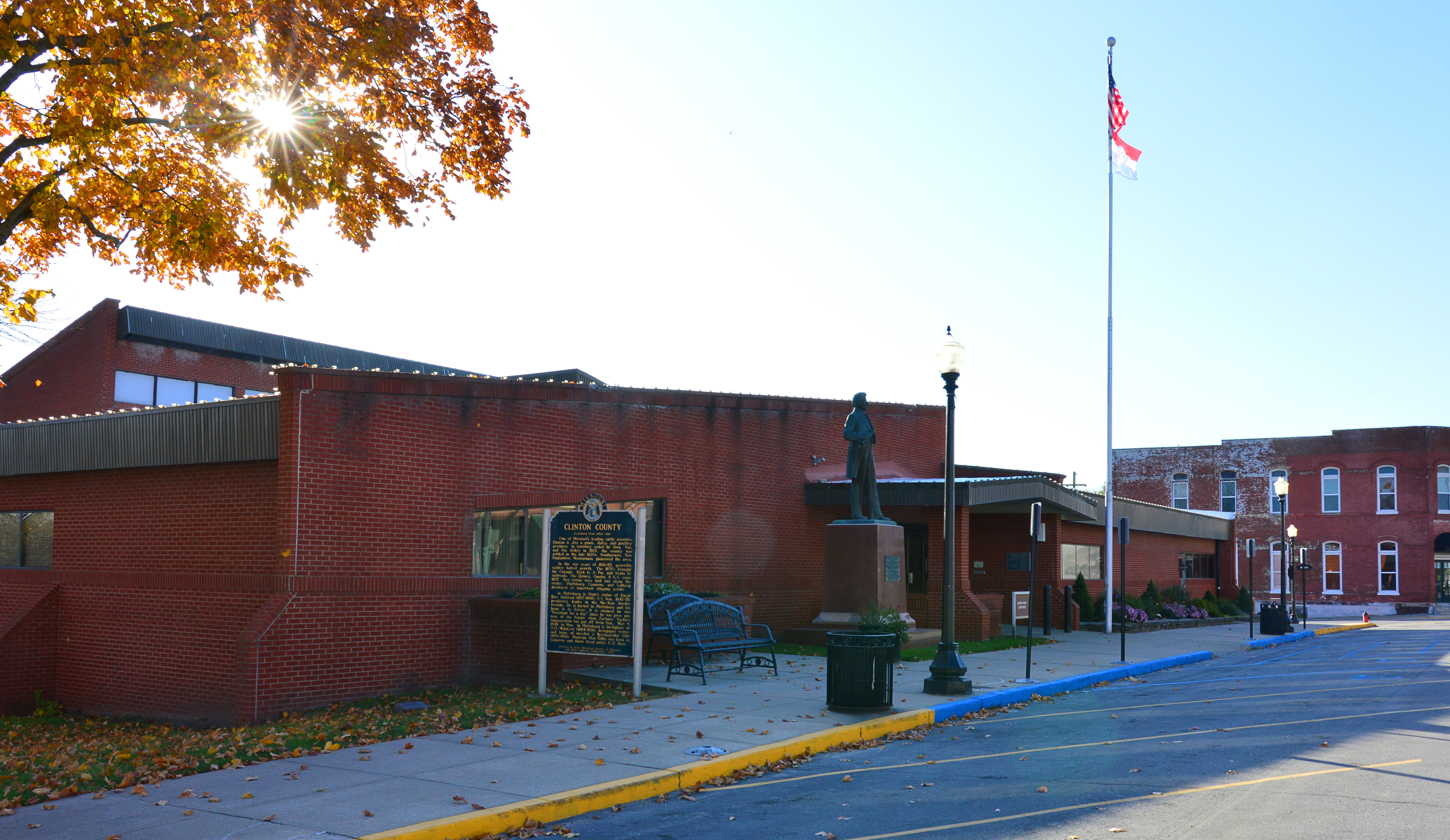
- Clinton County Courthouse

- Location of Plattsburg, Missouri
- Coordinates: 39°33′52″N 94°27′41″W
- Country: United States
- State: Missouri
- County: Clinton
- Founded: 1833 (as Concord, MO); 1835 (as Plattsburg, MO)

Government
  - Type: Mayor-Council
  - Mayor: Sue Malone
  - City Administrator: Steve Garrett

Area
  - Total: 3.63 sq mi (9.39 km^{2})
  - Land: 3.60 sq mi (9.33 km^{2})
  - Water: 0.027 sq mi (0.07 km^{2})
- Elevation: 929 ft (283 m)

Population (2020)
  - Total: 2,222
  - Density: 617.1/sq mi (238.26/km^{2})
- Time zone: UTC-6 (Central (CST))
  - Summer (DST): UTC-5 (CDT)
- ZIP code: 64477
- Area codes: 816, 975
- FIPS code: 29-58250
- GNIS feature ID: 2396228
- Website: www.plattsburg-mo.gov

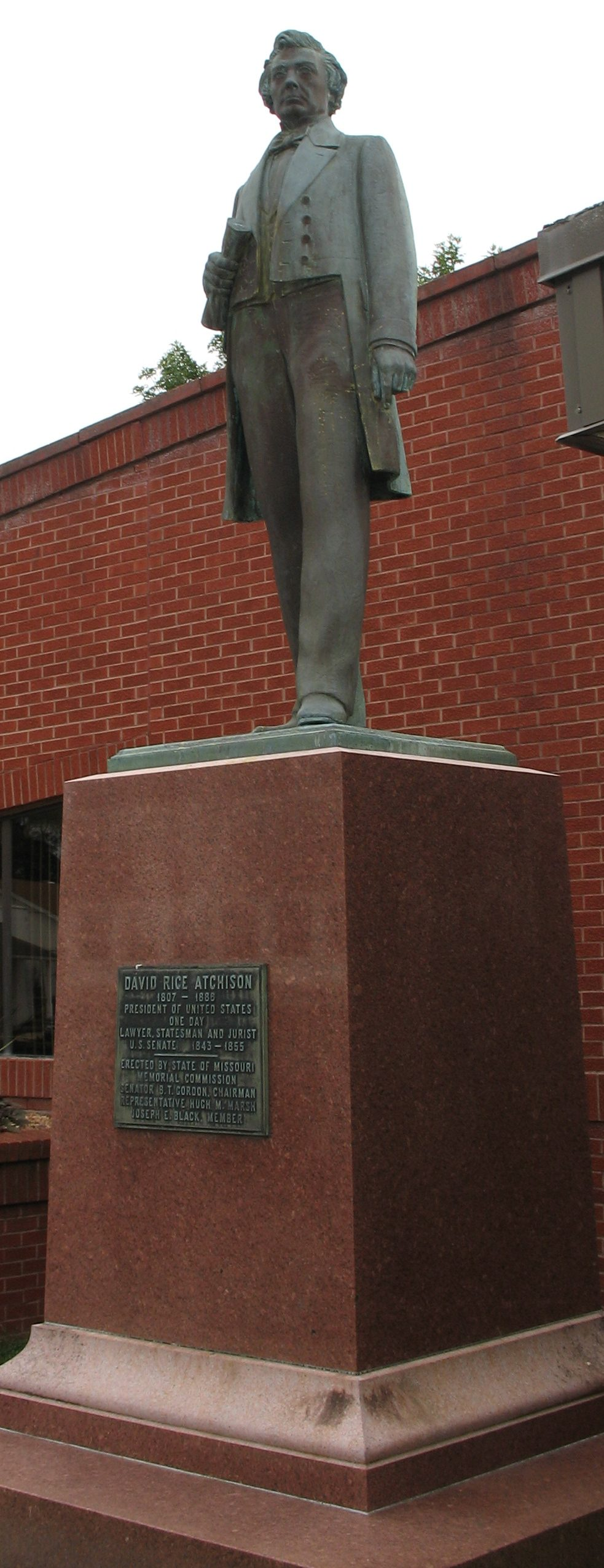
Statue of "President for a Day" David Rice Atchison at the Clinton County Courthouse

Plattsburg is a city in and the county seat of Clinton County, Missouri, United States; it is part of the Kansas City metropolitan area in the western part of the state. It developed along the Little Platte River. As of the 2020 census, the city population was 2,222.

== History ==
The area along the rivers has been inhabited for thousands of years by indigenous peoples. Historic Native American tribes in the area included the Ioway, Meskwaki and Sac tribes, who ceded land to the United States in the Platte Purchase. This area became part of northwest Missouri.

The European-American settlers first called their settlement Concord. (This has been used for a contemporary man-made lake and surrounding housing development in the city.) Later the city was renamed Springfield. After the discovery that there was an earlier Springfield, Missouri, settlers named it "Plattsburg," after Plattsburgh, New York. This is the seat of Clinton County, New York. Both it and Clinton County, Missouri were named for George Clinton, one of the Founding Fathers, the first governor of New York, and vice president of the United States from 1805 to 1812.

The area was settled chiefly by migrants from the Upper South, especially central Kentucky and western Virginia. It was near a region called "Little Dixie" in Missouri because of the strong Southern presence. These migrants brought their slaves and culture with them. For a brief period of time during the 1830s, Plattsburg was home to a Federal land office for areas of northern Missouri that were newly opened to settlement by European Americans after the Platte Purchase in 1836. Until then, Plattsburg was one of the farthest western non-military settlements.

The area became a leading producer of both hemp and tobacco, both major commodity products of the Bluegrass Region of central Kentucky. They were labor-intensive and dependent on labor of enslaved African Americans. David Rice Atchison, the US senator from here, was pro-slavery. As the county seat, Plattsburg was a center of trade and politics, with a variety of retail stores and professions. At one point, when Kansas City was a major beef processing and export center, Plattsburg was known as "the Beef Capital of the World".

By 1860, the county had a total population of 7,848. The 1,144 enslaved African Americans comprised 17% of the total. During the American Civil War, two minor battles took place nearby. The town was occupied by both Confederate and Federal forces. In 1863, elements of William Quantrill's guerrilla band captured a unit of Federal troops encamped in the county courthouse located in Plattsburg.

== Geography ==
According to the United States Census Bureau, the city has a total area of 3.63 square miles (9.40 km^{2}), of which 3.60 square miles (9.32 km^{2}) is land and 0.03 square miles (0.08 km^{2}) is water.

Water surrounds Plattsburg in the form of lakes and streams. Horse Fork passes by the east of the town before joining the Little Platte River, which traverses southwesterly below the town.

== Demographics ==
Historical population
Census	Pop.	Note	%±
1860	692		—
1870	1,667		140.9%
1880	1,344		−19.4%
1890	1,634		21.6%
1900	1,878		14.9%
1910	1,650		−12.1%
1920	1,719		4.2%
1930	1,672		−2.7%
1940	1,915		14.5%
1950	1,655		−13.6%
1960	1,663		0.5%
1970	1,832		10.2%
1980	2,095		14.4%
1990	2,248		7.3%
2000	2,354		4.7%
2010	2,319		−1.5%
2020	2,222		−4.2%
U.S. Decennial Census

=== Income and poverty ===
The median income for a household in the city was $46,757, and the median income for a family was $56,250. Males had a median income of $44,450 versus $30,708 for females. The per capita income for the city was $22,401. About 9.0% of families and 13.9% of the population were below the poverty line, including 19.9% of those under age 18 and 9.3% of those age 65 or over.

=== 2020 census ===
As of the 2020 census, Plattsburg had a population of 2,222. The median age was 44.5 years. 22.2% of residents were under the age of 18 and 22.7% of residents were 65 years of age or older. For every 100 females there were 91.7 males, and for every 100 females age 18 and over there were 89.2 males age 18 and over.

0.0% of residents lived in urban areas, while 100.0% lived in rural areas.

There were 929 households in Plattsburg, of which 28.0% had children under the age of 18 living in them. Of all households, 45.5% were married-couple households, 19.6% were households with a male householder and no spouse or partner present, and 27.6% were households with a female householder and no spouse or partner present. About 32.7% of all households were made up of individuals and 14.9% had someone living alone who was 65 years of age or older.

There were 1,070 housing units, of which 13.2% were vacant. The homeowner vacancy rate was 3.0% and the rental vacancy rate was 9.9%.

Racial composition as of the 2020 census
Race	Number	Percent
White	1,924	86.6%
Black or African American	119	5.4%
American Indian and Alaska Native	9	0.4%
Asian	5	0.2%
Native Hawaiian and Other Pacific Islander	0	0.0%
Some other race	23	1.0%
Two or more races	142	6.4%
Hispanic or Latino (of any race)	62	2.8%

=== 2010 census ===
As of the census of 2010, there were 2,319 people, 936 households, and 612 families residing in the city. The population density was 644.1 inhabitants per square mile (248.7/km^{2}). There were 1,080 housing units at an average density of 300 per square mile (120/km^{2}). The racial makeup of the city was 90.3% White, 6.0% African American, 0.5% Native American, 0.1% Asian, 0.5% from other races, and 2.5% from two or more races. Hispanic or Latino of any race were 2.3% of the population.

There were 936 households, of which 26.8% had children under the age of 18 living with them, 50.2% were married couples living together, 10.6% had a female householder with no spouse present, 4.6 had a male householder with no spouse present, and 34.6% were non-families. 30.9% of all households were made up of individuals, and 12.3% had someone living alone who was 65 years of age or older. The average household size was 2.42 and the average family size was 3.02.

In the city, the population was spread out, with 26% under the age of 20, 5.4% from 20 to 24, 21.6% from 25 to 44, 28.9% from 45 to 64, and 18.1% who were 65 years of age or older. The median age was 43 years. The male population was 47.8%, which results in a 52.2% female population.

== Education ==
It is in the Clinton County R-III School District.

== Notable people ==
- David Rice Atchison, US Senator (1844–1855) from Missouri, lived here and was buried here.
- Ulysses Hollimon, Negro American League ballplayer, was born in Mississippi, and was a long-time resident of Plattsburg
- Bela M. Hughes (1817–1903), pioneer, born in Kentucky, served as a federal officer in Plattsburg from 1845 to 1849
- James C. Marshall (1897–1977), United States Army officer supervising the Manhattan Project, was born in Plattsburg
- O. O. McIntyre, noted New York newspaper columnist of early 20th century, was born in Plattsburg
