= Kenneth Wilson (politician) =

American politician

Member of the Missouri House of Representatives from the 12th district
- In office 2013–2021

Personal details
- Born: May 1, 1954 (age 72)
- Party: Republican
- Spouse: Melissa
- Children: two
- Profession: policeman

Kenneth Wilson (born May 1, 1954) is an American politician. He is a member of the Missouri House of Representatives, having served since 2013. He is a member of the Republican Party.
