= Hardin Township, Clinton County, Missouri =

Township in Clinton County, Missouri, U.S.

Hardin Township
- Township
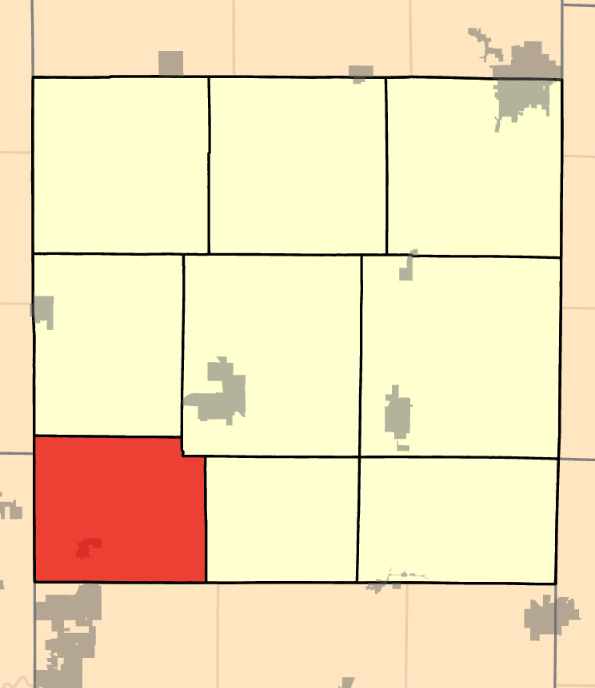
- Coordinates: 39°30′09″N 94°32′13″W
- Country: United States
- State: Missouri
- County: Clinton

Area
  - Total: 39.19 sq mi (101.5 km^{2})
  - Land: 35.35 sq mi (91.6 km^{2})
  - Water: 3.84 sq mi (9.9 km^{2}) 9.8%
- Elevation: 928 ft (283 m)

Population (2020)
  - Total: 1,679
  - Density: 47.5/sq mi (18.3/km^{2})
- FIPS code: 29-04930304
- GNIS feature ID: 766514

Hardin Township is a township in Clinton County, Missouri, United States. At the 2020 census, its population was 1,679.

Hardin Township was erected in 1834, and most likely was named after Hardin County, Kentucky, the native home of a first settler.
