= Atchison Township, Clinton County, Missouri =

Township in Clinton County, Missouri, U.S.

Atchison Township
- Township
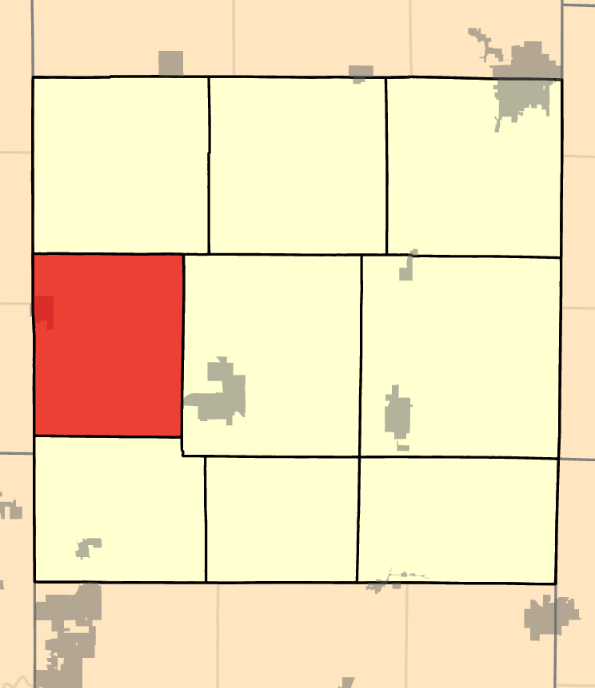
- Coordinates: 39°35′28″N 94°33′00″W
- Country: United States
- State: Missouri
- County: Clinton

Area
  - Total: 43.38 sq mi (112.4 km^{2})
  - Land: 43.38 sq mi (112.4 km^{2})
  - Water: 0.0 sq mi (0 km^{2}) 0.0%
- Elevation: 883 ft (269 m)

Population (2020)
  - Total: 2,071
  - Density: 47.7/sq mi (18.4/km^{2})
- FIPS code: 29-04902332
- GNIS feature ID: 766511

Atchison Township is a township in Clinton County, Missouri, United States. At the 2020 census, its population was 2,071.

Atchison Township has the name of David Rice Atchison, a Missouri senator.
