= Concord Township, Clinton County, Missouri =

Township in Clinton County, Missouri, U.S.

Concord Township
- Township
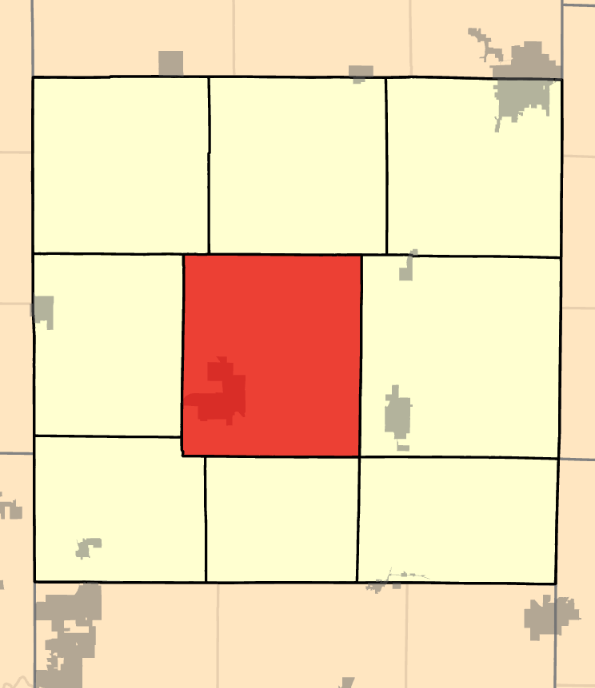
- Coordinates: 39°34′54″N 94°25′25″W
- Country: United States
- State: Missouri
- County: Clinton

Area
  - Total: 57.26 sq mi (148.3 km^{2})
  - Land: 57.02 sq mi (147.7 km^{2})
  - Water: 0.24 sq mi (0.62 km^{2}) 0.42%
- Elevation: 974 ft (297 m)

Population (2020)
  - Total: 2,894
  - Density: 50.8/sq mi (19.6/km^{2})
- FIPS code: 29-04915976
- GNIS feature ID: 766513

Concord Township is a township in Clinton County, Missouri, United States. At the 2020 census, its population was 2,894.

The township most likely was named in commemoration of the Battle of Concord.
