= Platte Township, Clay County, Missouri =

Township in Clay County, Missouri, U.S.

Platte Township
- Township
- Interactive map of Platte Township
- Coordinates: 39°22′51″N 94°31′49″W
- Country: United States
- State: Missouri
- County: Clay

Area
  - Total: 75.04 sq mi (194.4 km^{2})
  - Land: 68.2 sq mi (177 km^{2})
  - Water: 6.84 sq mi (17.7 km^{2}) 9.12%
- Elevation: 863 ft (263 m)

Population (2020)
  - Total: 19,981
  - Density: 293/sq mi (113/km^{2})
- FIPS code: 29-04758142
- GNIS feature ID: 766509

Platte Township is a township in Clay County, Missouri, United States. At the 2020 census, its population was 19,981.

Platte Township was erected in 1827, taking its name from the Platte River.
