= Subiaco Abbey (Arkansas) =

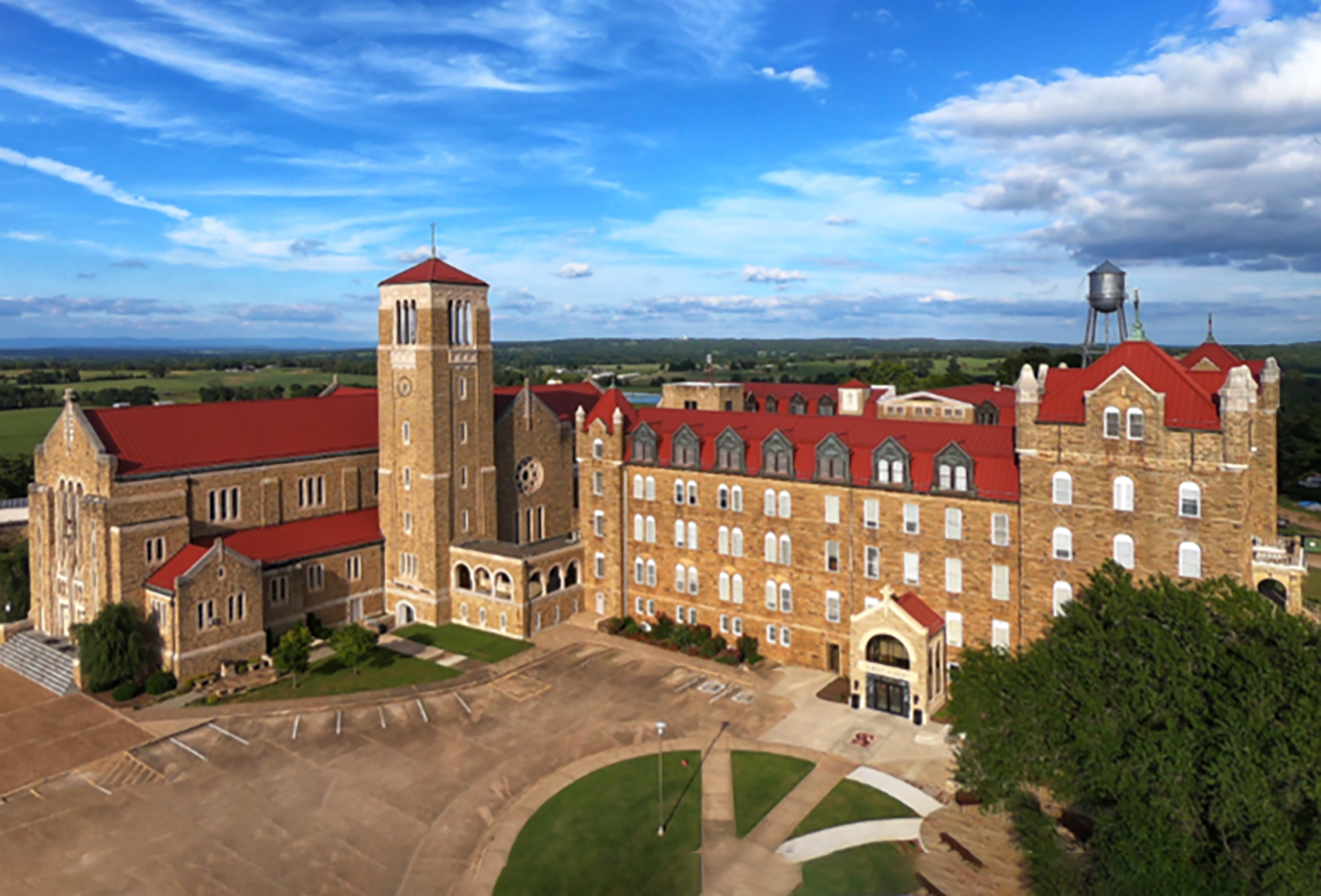

- Location within Arkansas Location within the United States

Monastery information
- Other names: New Subiaco Abbey, St. Benedict Priory
- Order: Benedictine
- Established: March 15, 1878
- Mother house: St. Meinrad Archabbey (1878-1891)
- Dedication: St. Benedict of Nursia
- Diocese: Little Rock

People
- Abbot: The Right Rev. Elijah Owens, O.S.B.
- Prior: Fr. Richard Walz, O.S.B.

Architecture
- Status: active
- Functional status: abbey
- Groundbreaking: 1898
- Completed date: 1902

Site
- Coordinates: 35.3011°N 93.6333°W
- Website: www.countrymonks.org

- Subiaco Abbey
- U.S. National Register of Historic Places
- Website: Official Listing
- NRHP reference No.: 78003484
- Added to NRHP: February 28, 1978

Subiaco Abbey is an American Benedictine monastery located in the Arkansas River valley of Logan County, Arkansas, part of the Swiss-American Congregation of Benedictine monasteries. It is home to thirty-nine Benedictine monks. The abbey and the preparatory school it operates, Subiaco Academy, are major features of the town of Subiaco, Arkansas. It is named after the original Subiaco, Italy, where the first monastery founded by Saint Benedict was located.

The Abbey has developed commercial enterprises including breeding of black Angus cattle, a brewery and taproom, and its own hot sauce. While located within the territory of the Roman Catholic Diocese of Little Rock, the Abbey has independent authority as an institution of the Benedictine order.

== History ==
In 1877, the Little Rock and Fort Smith Railroad (LR&FS) owned thousands of open acres in Arkansas that it wished to develop with settlers. Deciding to offer land only to German Catholics, the company approached Martin Marty (bishop), O.S.B., the Abbot of St. Meinrad Abbey in Indiana, with a proposal. The railroad offered land in western Arkansas, south of the Arkansas River, if the Abbey would establish a monastery and school there to serve the German immigrant population the railroad was bringing into the region. The abbot negotiated with the railroad for a grant of 640 acres (2.6 km^{2}) to establish a Benedictine monastery for monks, and an additional 100 acres (0.40 km^{2}) for the foundation of a monastery for Benedictine nuns. This agreement was supported by Edward Fitzgerald, Bishop of the Diocese of Little Rock, who needed German-speaking priests to serve new immigrants and their families in his diocese.

Abbot Marty assigned three monk-missionaries from St. Meinrad to start the foundation in Logan County, Arkansas. They arrived there on March 15, 1878: Father Wolfgang Schlumpf, O.S.B., assigned as prior; Brother Kaspar Hildesheim, O.S.B.; and Brother Hilarin Benetz, O.S.B.. The foundation was developed as St. Benedict's Priory. Due to financial and personnel difficulties, St. Meinrad requested assistance from its mother house in Switzerland to aid the growth. In the fall of 1887, its founding monastery, Einsiedeln Abbey, responded to appeals from the foundation in Arkansas, and sent Fr. Gaul D'Aujourd'hui with eight candidates for the monastery. They became known in the tradition as the Eight Beatitudes.

In 1886 the monastery was raised to a conventual priory, independent of St. Meinrad Abbey. In 1891 it was named as an abbey by Pope Leo XIII, receiving the name Subiaco Abbey in honor of St. Benedict's original monastery in Subiaco, Italy. The first abbot, Ignatius Conrad, O.S.B., was elected in March 1892. He was a monk from Einsiedeln Abbey who had been serving at the Roman Catholic Diocese of Kansas City–Saint Joseph in western Missouri. Under his leadership, construction of a new abbey was begun in 1898; it was made from local sandstone. In December 1901, just as the construction was nearing completion, the original wooden abbey, located about a mile away, burned to the ground.

The monks transferred to the Subiaco Abbey site. This building was gutted by fire in 1927 and was rebuilt. The third Abbot of Subiaco, Paul Nahlen, O.S.B., obtained Pope Pius XII's blessing for the construction of the present church on the Abbey campus. The church was completed in 1959. This act is depicted in one of the 182 stained-glass windows in St. Benedict Abbey Church.

Over the years, the Benedictine monks at Subiaco have pursued various spiritual, agricultural, and commercial endeavors. First were missionary works, then they established Subiaco Academy, a university-preparatory school.

In 1927, Subiaco Abbey took its first step in establishing what would become Corpus Christi Abbey in Corpus Christi, Texas. This institution closed in 2002.

The monks have been brewing beer for their own consumption since the 1920s. In 2018, they began to sell their beer to the public, under the name "Country Monks Brewing."

They made an overseas foundation in 1964 in Nigeria, but it had to be closed in 1968, due to the Biafran War there. The Benedictines made a subsequent foundation, Santa Familia Priory, in Belize in 1971. It closed in 2002.

In January 2023, Jerrid Farnam was arrested for public intoxication, theft of property, criminal mischief, breaking or entering, and residential burglary for breaking into the Abbey, vandalizing the marble altar, and stealing two boxes of relics containing 1,500 year old relics related to Catholic saints. Both boxes were recovered by police.

=== List of Abbots ===
1. Rt. Rev. Ignatius Conrad, O.S.B. (1892–1926)
2. Rt. Rev. Edward Burgert, O.S.B. (1926–1939)
3. Rt. Rev. Paul Nahlen, O.S.B. (1939–1957)
4. Rt. Rev. Michael Lensing, O.S.B. (1957–1974)
5. Rt. Rev. Raphael DeSalvo, O.S.B. (1974–1989)
6. Rt. Rev. Jerome Kodell, O.S.B. (1989–2015)
7. Rt. Rev. Leonard Wangler, O.S.B. (2015–2022)
8. Rt. Rev. Elijah Owens, O.S.B. (2022–present)

== Subiaco Academy ==
The academy has a diverse student body of American students and international students; the latter come from China, Hong Kong, Mexico, Curaçao, and South Korea. In 2020, the academy was ranked by Niche as the #1 Catholic High School in Arkansas. The student body is composed of 60% boarders, 30% students of color, and 9% international students.

David Wright, Ed.D., was appointed in 2018 as Subiaco Academy Headmaster. He was previously Assistant Vice-president and athletic director of Gettysburg College in Pennsylvania. In 2019 he instituted a new “Parallel Curriculum” within the academy to focus on “integrity-based and socially responsible leadership.”

== Media references ==
Great Big Story, a media company of CNN, produced a segment on the Hot Sauce operations of the Abbey. American Angus Association produced a segment on the Angus Farm operations of the Abbey. KTHV, a media company in Little Rock, Arkansas, produced a segment on the new CountryMonks Brewing and the Hot Sauce operations of the Abbey.

== Abuse allegations ==
Catholic institutions in Arkansas have received allegations of child abuse by priests and monks assigned to Subiaco. Since 2018 they have provided public information about these allegations. On September 10, 2018, the Roman Catholic Diocese of Little Rock released a report disclosing the names of clergy who at some time served in Arkansas and who have been credibly accused of child sexual abuse.

As it is independent of the diocese, on January 24, 2020, the Abbey of Subiaco released its own report; it disclosed the names of three deceased monks with established allegations of abuse: Nicholas Fuhrmann, Francis Zimmerer, and Patrick Hannon. Two additional deceased monks were listed as "Of Note": Fr. Timothy Donnelly for "multiple incidents of inappropriate touching", and Fr. Bede Mitchel as a "credible allegation of abuse" by the Diocese of Fort Worth (TX). Neither Subiaco Abbey nor a third party independent investigator could find any evidence related to the latter allegation against Fr. Mitchel.

A criminal investigation is pending of Fr. Jeremy Myers, a former monk who left Subiaco Abbey to become a diocesan priest in the Diocese of Dallas (TX) in 1991.

== Gallery ==
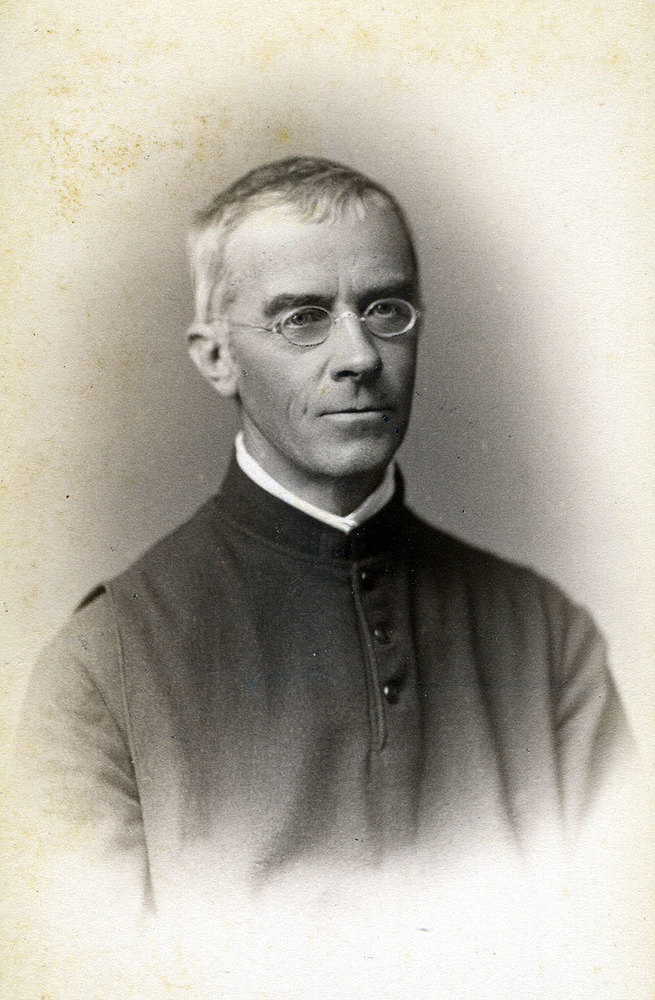

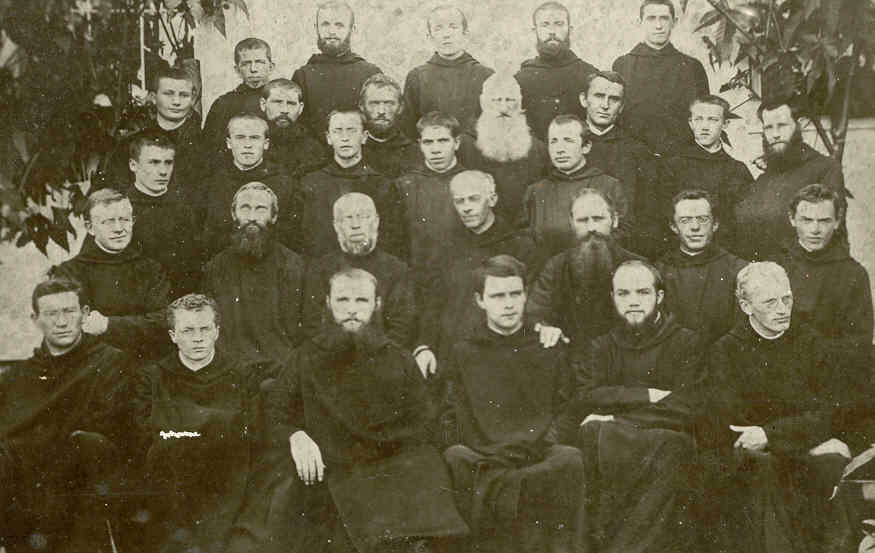

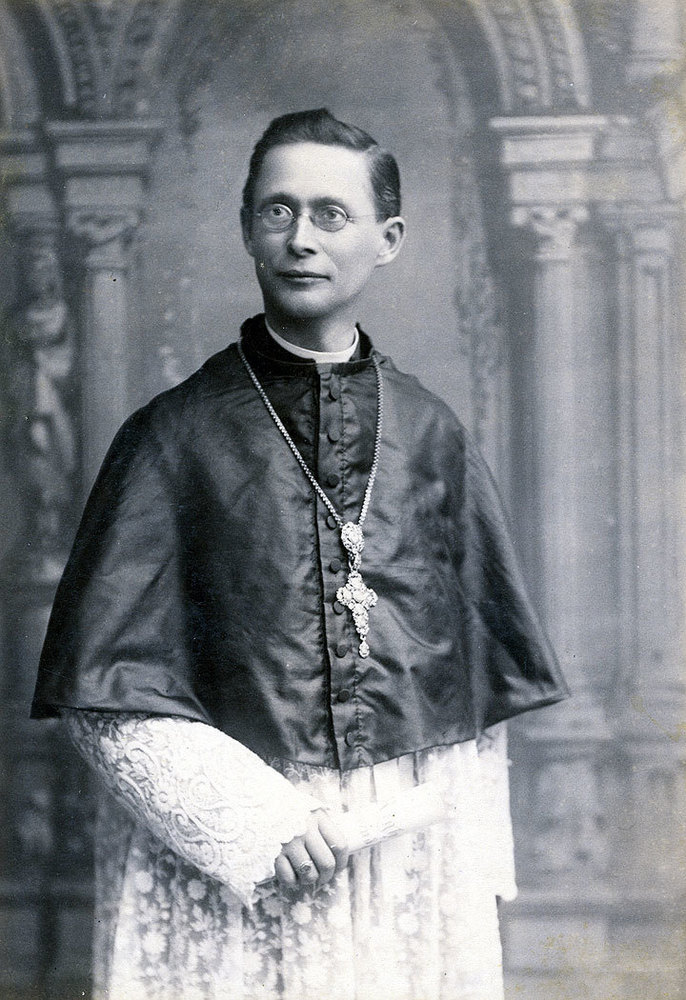

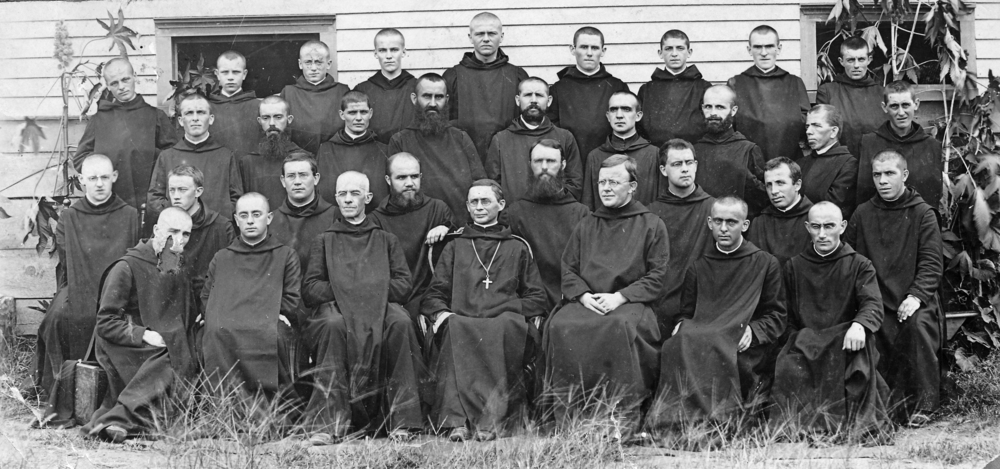

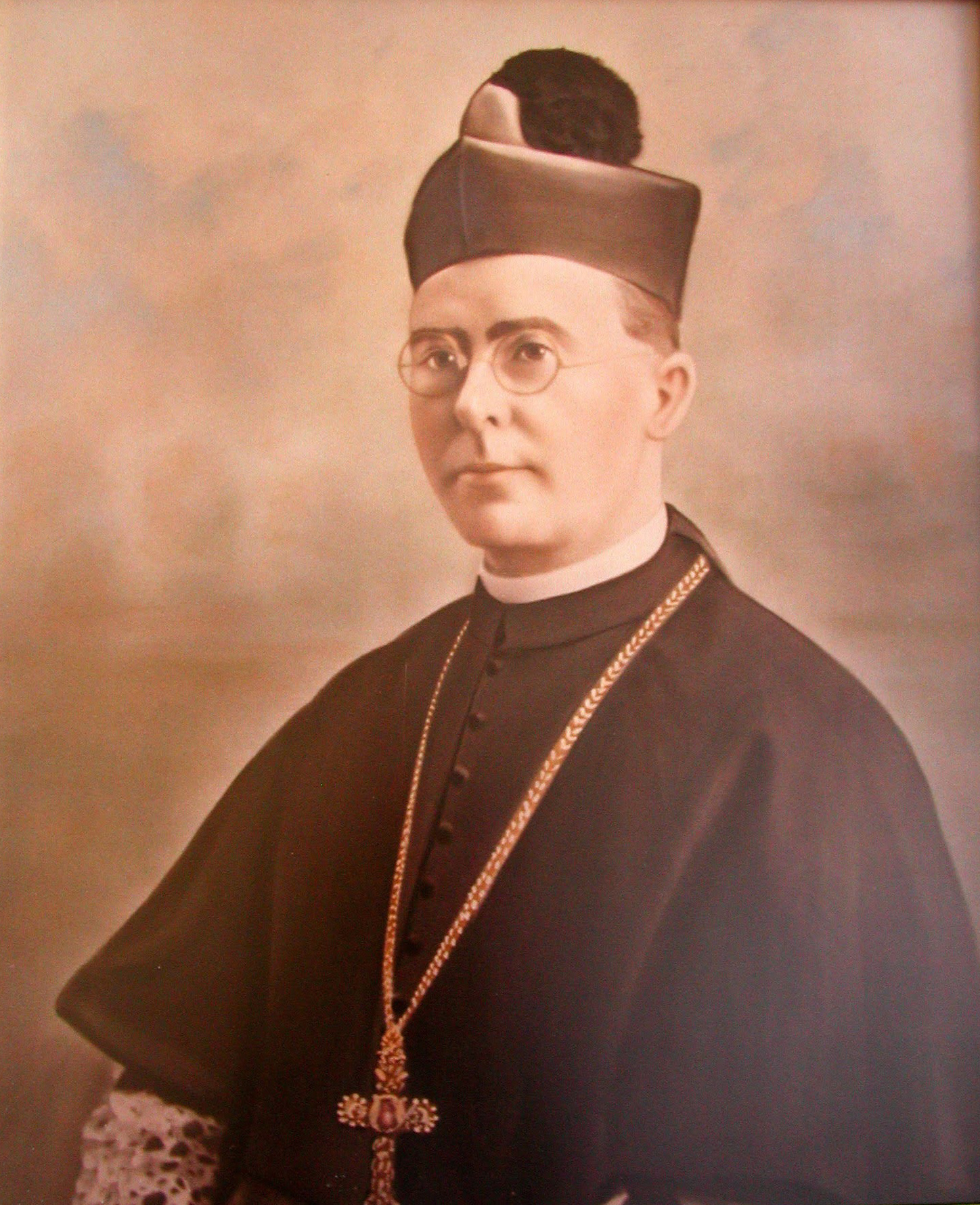

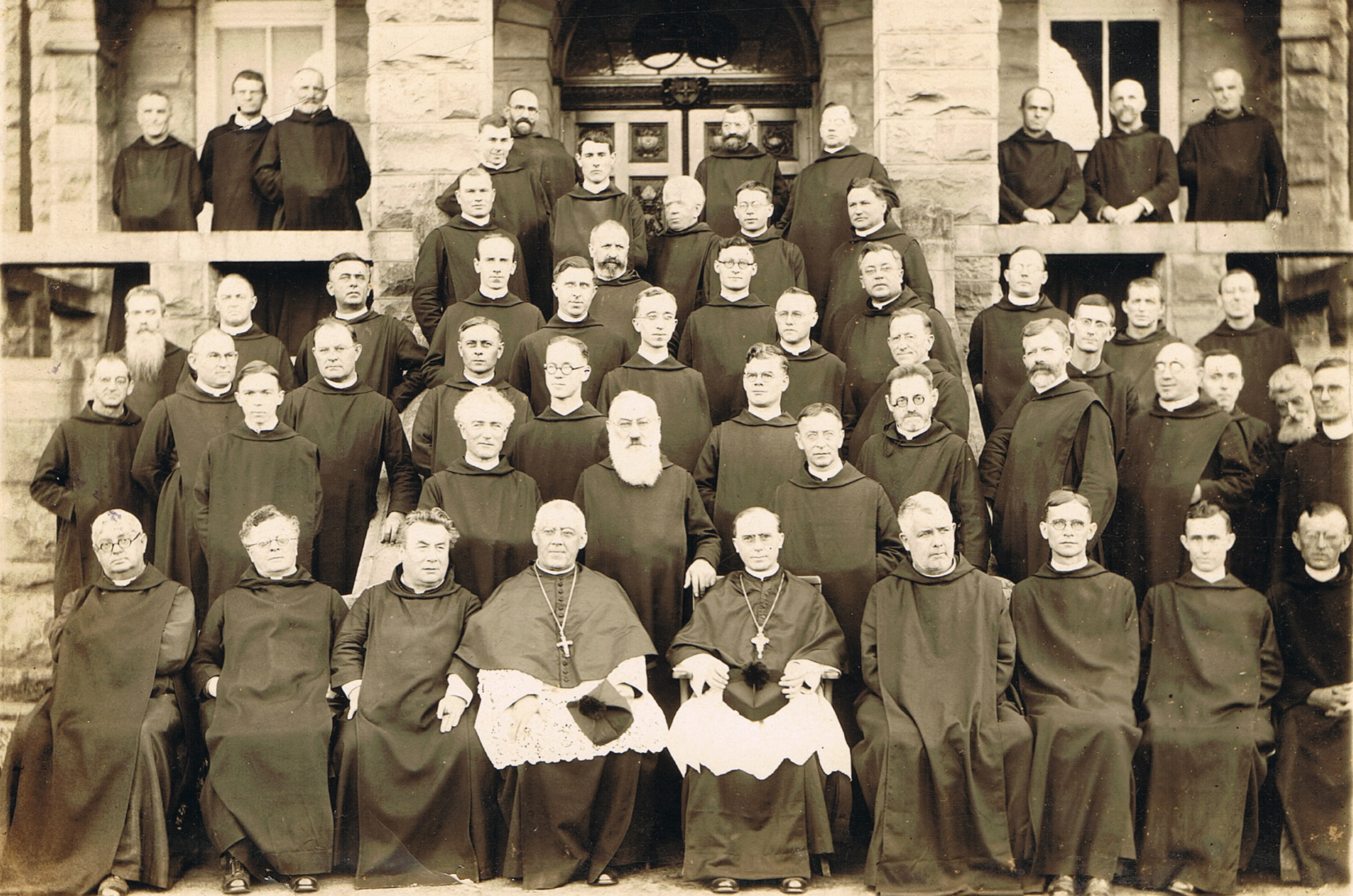

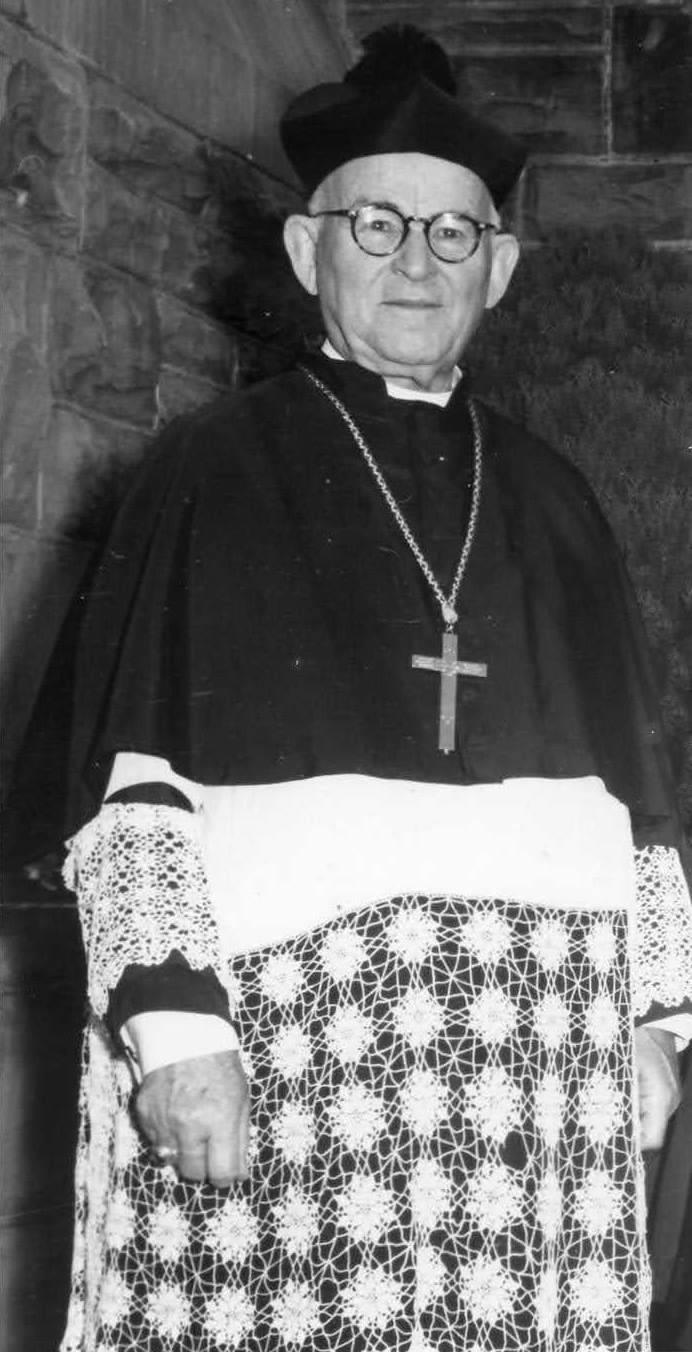

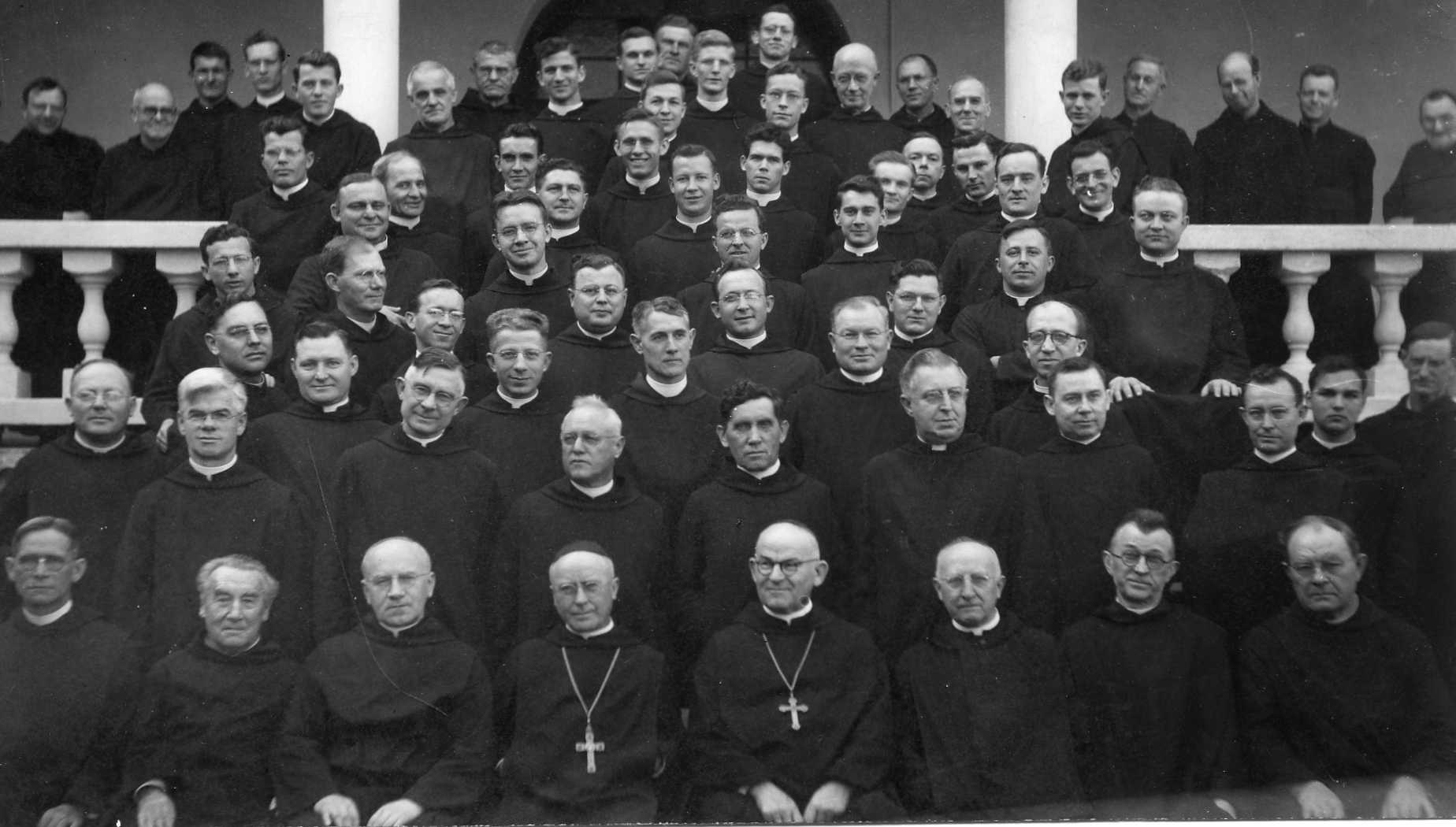

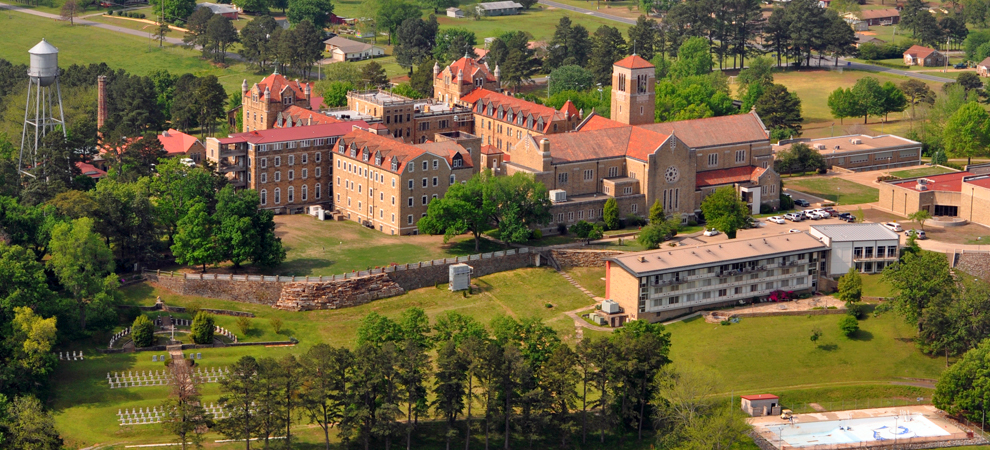

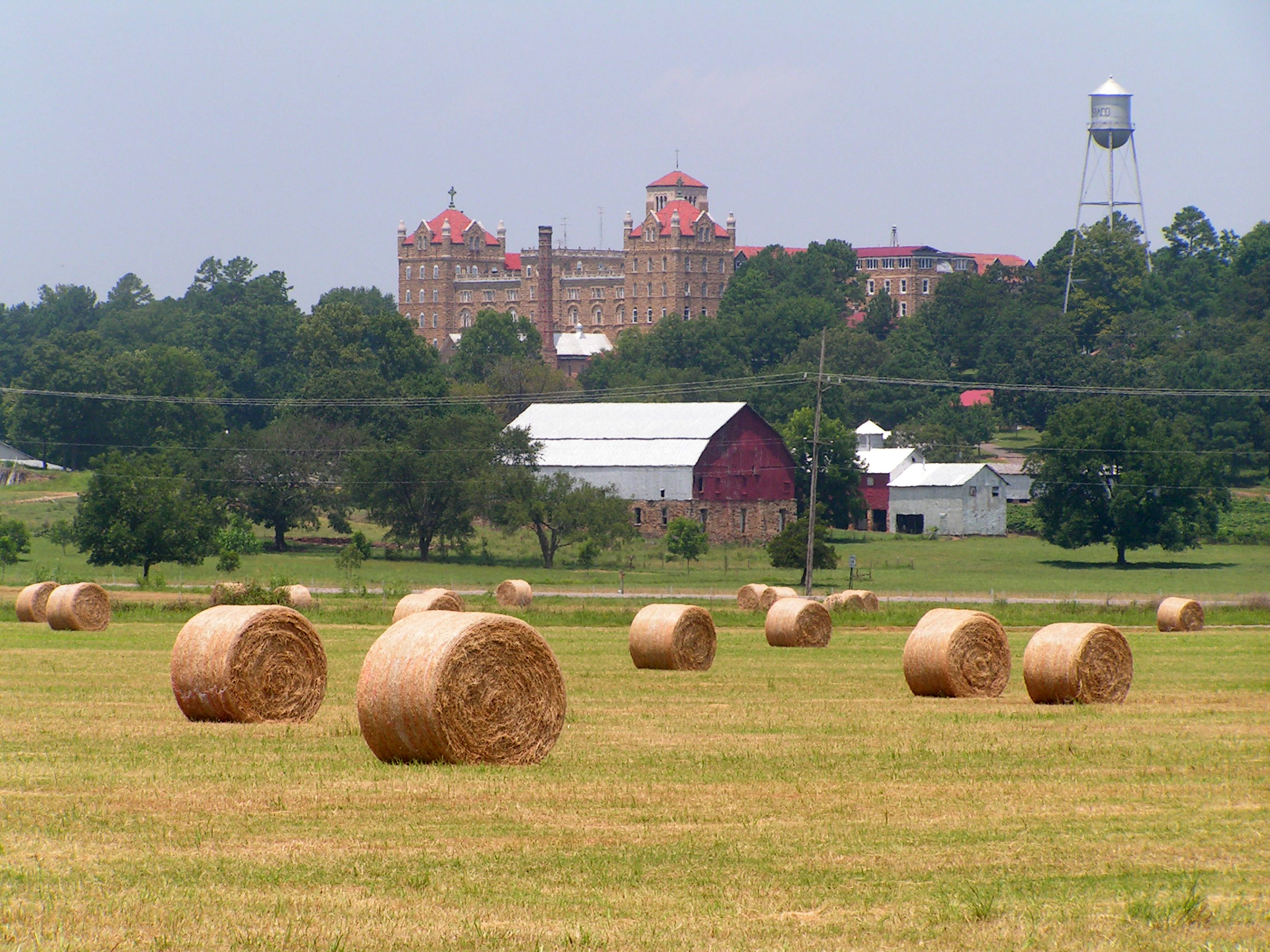

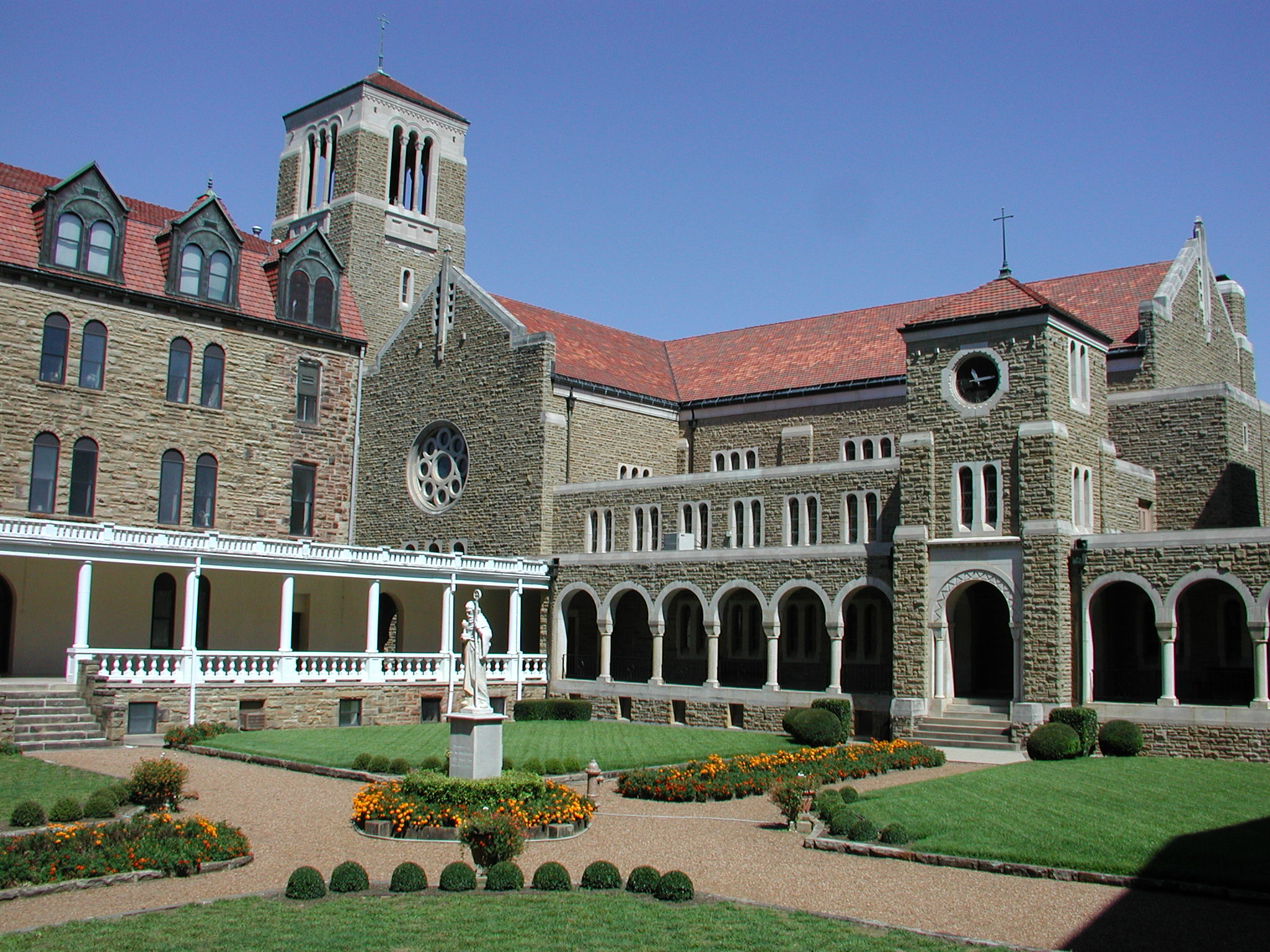

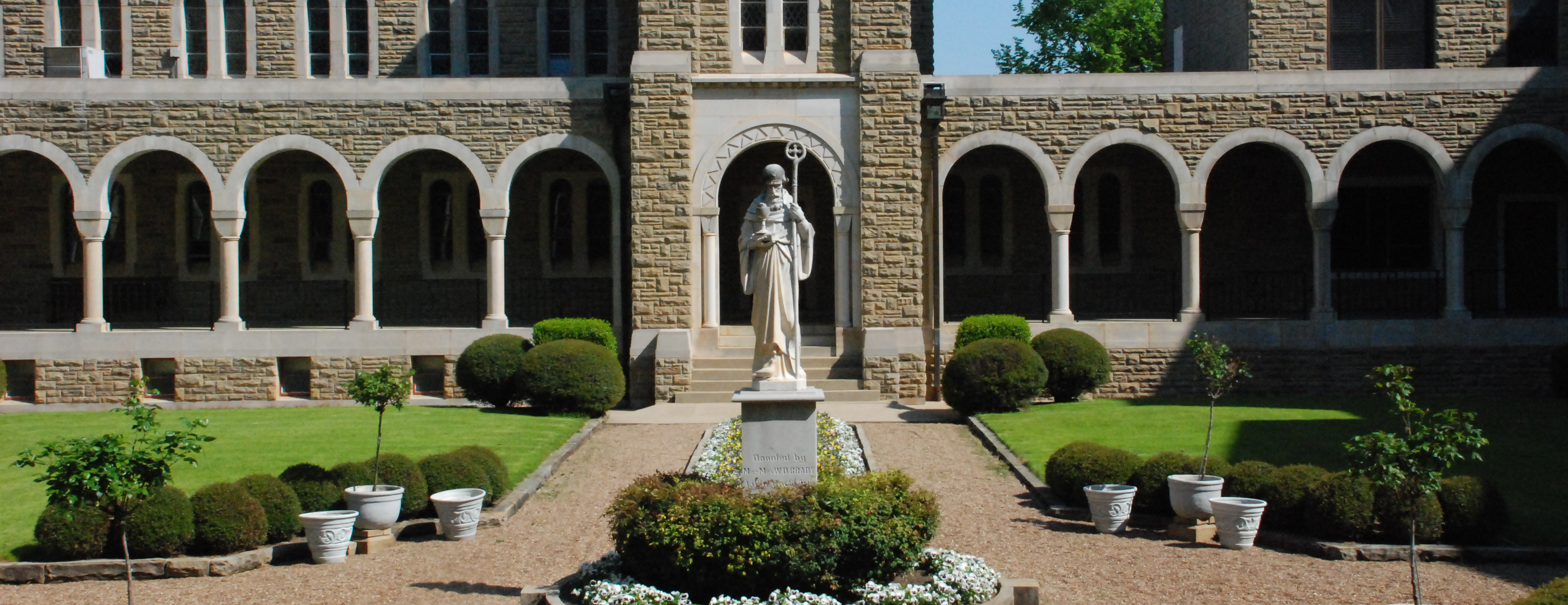

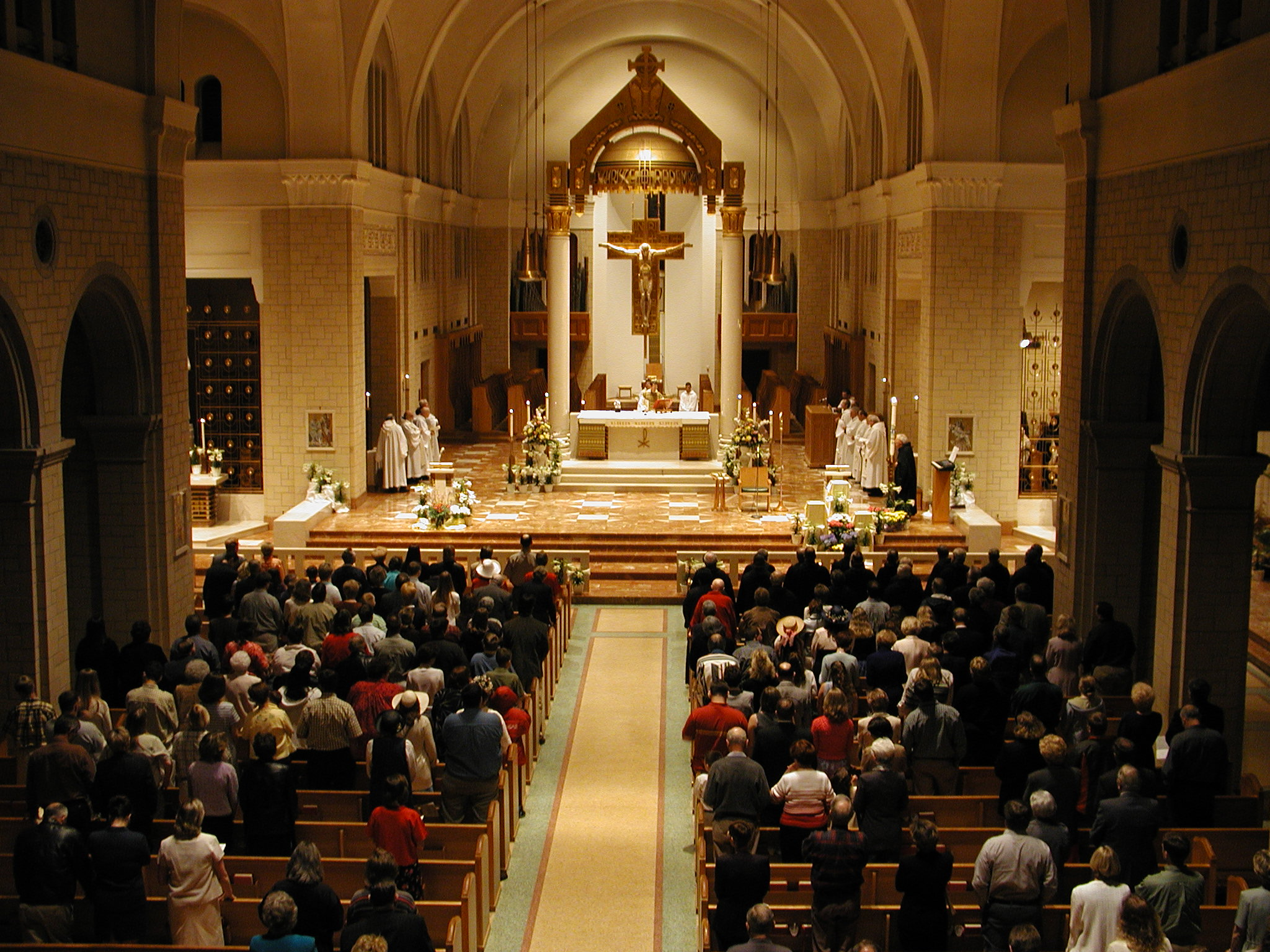

== See also ==
- Subiaco, Italy (the city)
- Subiaco Abbey, Italy
- Einsiedeln Abbey
- St. Meinrad Archabbey
