= Edward Burgert =

Benedictine monk and the second Abbot of Subiaco Abbey in Arkansas

The Right Reverend Edward Burgert OSB
- Abbot
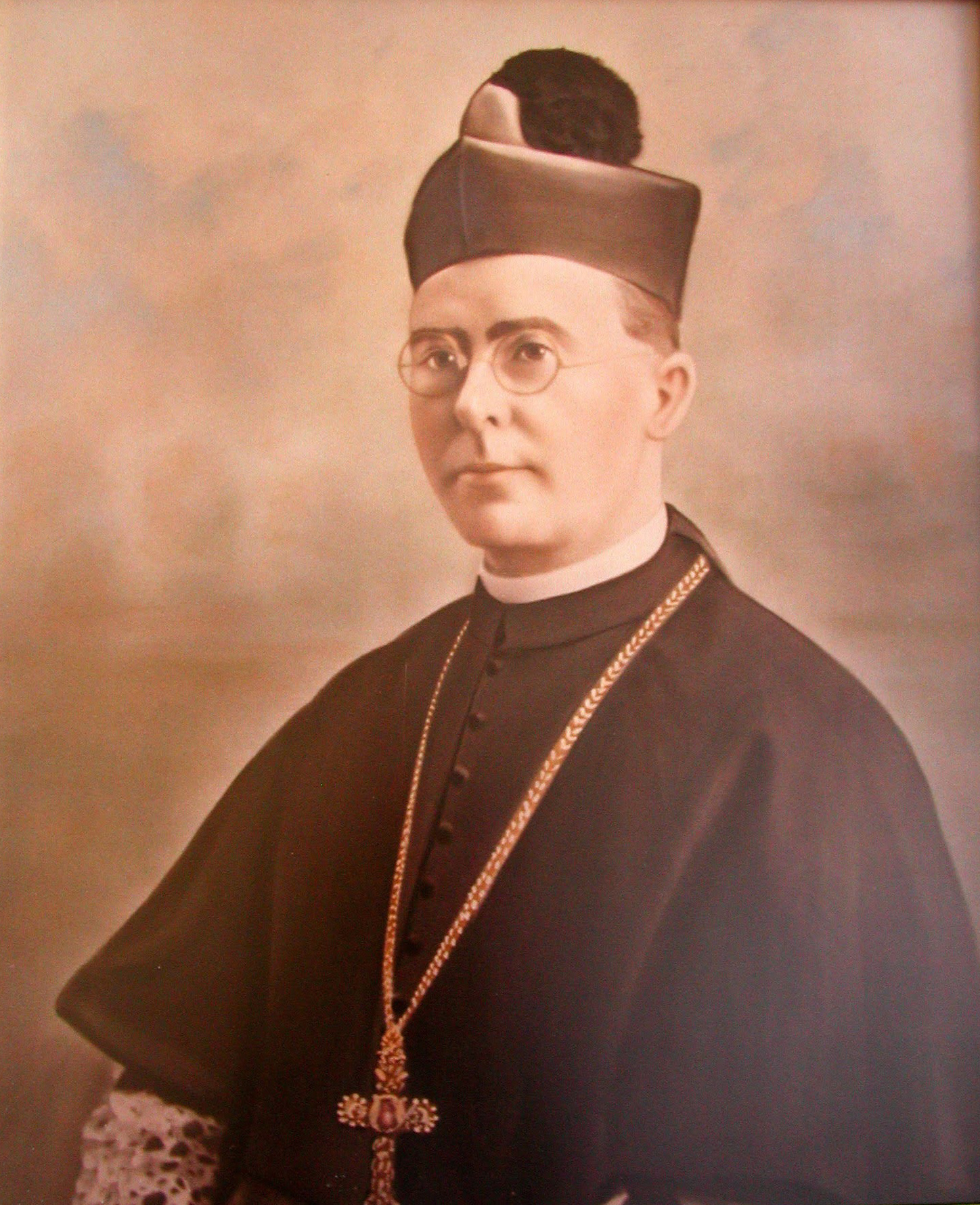
- Native name: Joseph Andrew Burgert
- Elected: December 1, 1925

Orders
- Ordination: June 24, 1911 by Bishop John B. Morris
- Rank: Abbot

Personal details
- Born: October 15, 1887 Paris, Arkansas
- Died: January 23, 1968 (aged 80) Refugio, Texas
- Buried: Subiaco Abbey
- Denomination: Roman Catholic
- Parents: Theodore Burgert and Mary Strobel
- Occupation: Abbot
- Profession: Benedictine Monk

Edward Burgert OSB (October 15, 1887 – January 23, 1968) was a Benedictine monk and the second Abbot of Subiaco Abbey in Arkansas. He would become known not only for his service in the Catholic Church as a monk, priest, scholar, and abbot, but also for his civic work as an educator and rural farmers' advocate.

== Early life ==
Joseph Andrew Burgert was born in Paris, Arkansas, on October 15, 1887, the son of Theodore Burgert and Mary Strobel. His father died three months after his birth and his mother married Joseph Duerr, the only father he knew. He attended parochial schools in Little Rock and Morrison Bluff. When his family moved to Altus, Arkansas, he enrolled at Subiaco College in 1898 at age 11. The school moved to the present site of Subiaco Abbey after a fire in December 1901. When the new school year opened in October, 1902, Joseph Burgert was the senior among the students.

== Monk and Priest ==
He made his profession of vows on September 16, 1906, receiving the name Edward, and was ordained to the priesthood by Bishop John B. Morris on June 24, 1911. He taught in the Abbey school for the next seven years, and then was sent to the Catholic University of America in Washington, D.C., where in 1921 he earned a PhD in English. His dissertation was entitled The Dependence of Part 1 of Cynewulf's Christ Upon the Antiphonary. He returned to Subiaco Abbey in the fall of 1921, teaching again in the school with the added responsibility of Director of Formation for new monks. In January, 1923, he was appointed Prior of the monastery (second in command to Abbot Ignatius).

== Abbot ==
When Abbot Ignatius Conrad’s failing health led him to petition to resign his office, Father Edward was elected coadjutor Abbot with the right of succession on December 1, 1925, and succeeded to the full responsibility of Abbot with the death of Abbot Ignatius on March 13, 1926.

In the spring of 1927, Subiaco Abbey undertook the establishment of a high school in Corpus Christi, Texas, which would become the seed of the future Corpus Christi Abbey. On the night of December 20, 1927, two-thirds of the main building of Subiaco Abbey was destroyed by fire, and the efforts of the Abbot and all the monks were redirected to recovery for the next several years. In the summer of 1928, the Abbey accepted administration of Laneri High School in Fort Worth, Texas.

His health broken by the pressures of administration and rebuilding during the years of the Great Depression, Abbot Edward resigned the office of Abbot on February 22, 1939.

== Final years ==
After resignation of his office, Abbot Edward spent years in parish ministry and hospital chaplaincy. From 1939 to 1942 he served parishes in the Diocese of Omaha, Nebraska; from 1942 to 1951 he was pastor of St. Mary’s Church in Windthorst, Texas; from 1951 to 1953 he was pastor of St. Scholastica Church in Shoal Creek, Arkansas, and 1953 -1954 pastor of St. Edward Church in Little Rock, Arkansas. From 1954 to 1957 he was chaplain at Spohn Hospital in Corpus Christi, Texas, from 1957 to 1959 chaplain of the Marist Brothers at St. Joseph's Academy in Brownsville, Texas, and from 1959 until his death chaplain at Refugio County Hospital in Refugio, Texas. On January 11, 1968, Abbot Edward suffered a heart attack at Spohn Hospital and was partially paralyzed but conscious until he died on January 23, 1968.

== Notability ==
During his lifetime, Abbot Edward had a number of accomplishments.

- He served as the second Abbot and Ordinary of Subiaco Abbey. Under his leadership, monks would be assigned to found and care for Catholic Churches across three dioceses and two states (Texas and Arkansas). The Abbey had begun especially working with local farmers to begin the first farmers collective and credit union. The monastic community had grown to become the 58th largest Benedictine Abbey in the world. At the time of his resignation from office, the monastic community had grown to eighty monks with six in temporary profession.
- He founded Corpus Christi College Academy in Corpus Christi, Texas, in 1927 at the request of the local Bishop. This institution closed in 1972, but served a vital service for the education of young men in south Texas for almost fifty years.
- He assumed the administration of Laneri College in 1928 in Fort Worth, Texas, that would later become the all-boys Laneri Catholic High School. In 1961 it merged with the all-girls Our Lady of Victory Girl's Academy to form the new Nolan Catholic High School under the administration of the Diocese. Nolan is now the largest Catholic college preparatory school in the Diocese of Fort Worth, Texas.
- Due to his work both within the Catholic Church and extensive involvement in civic affairs with founding and administering educational institutions across the states of Arkansas and Texas, he was listed as a member of the international Biography of Outstanding Benedictines: Biographia Benedictina.

== Gallery ==
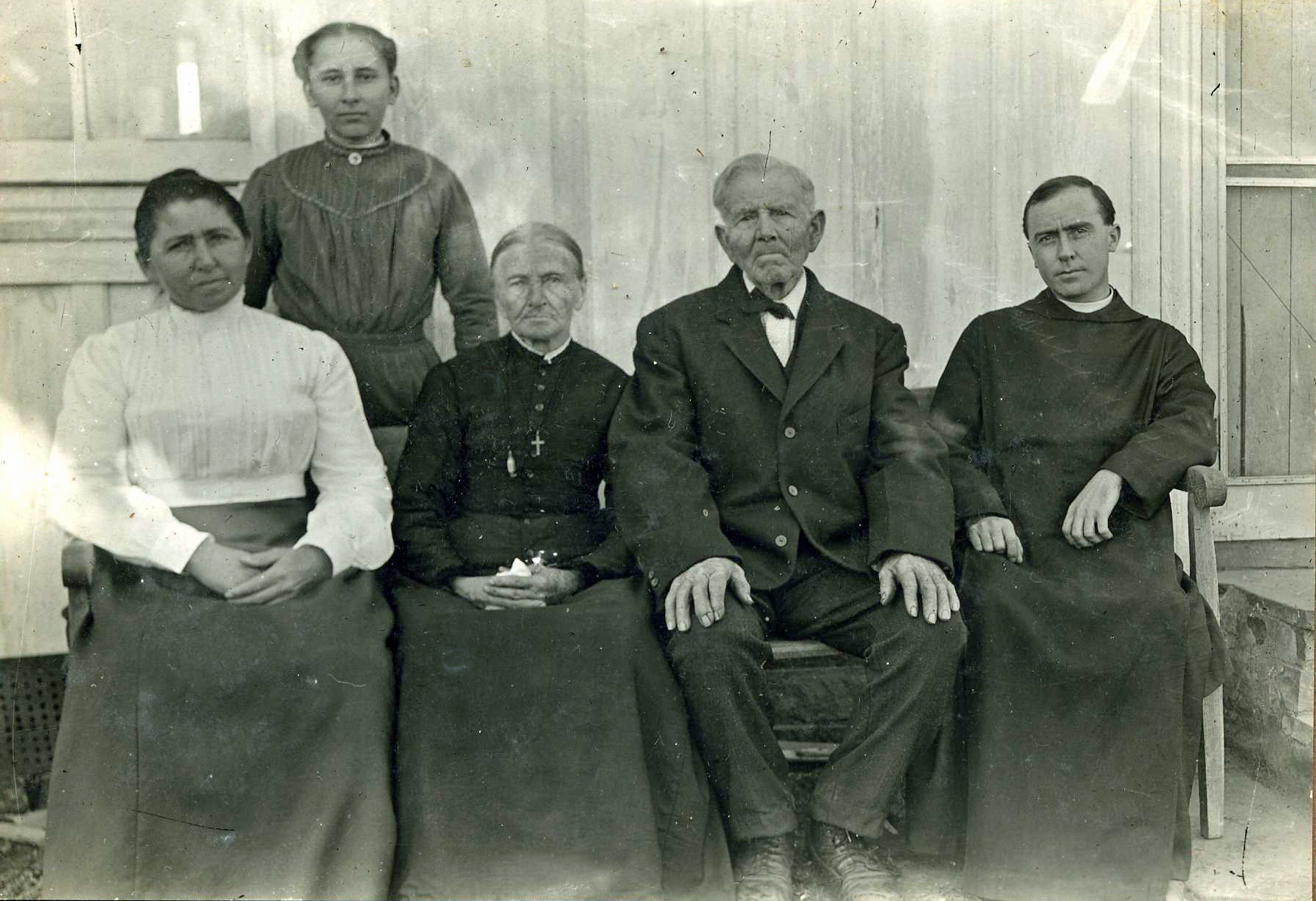

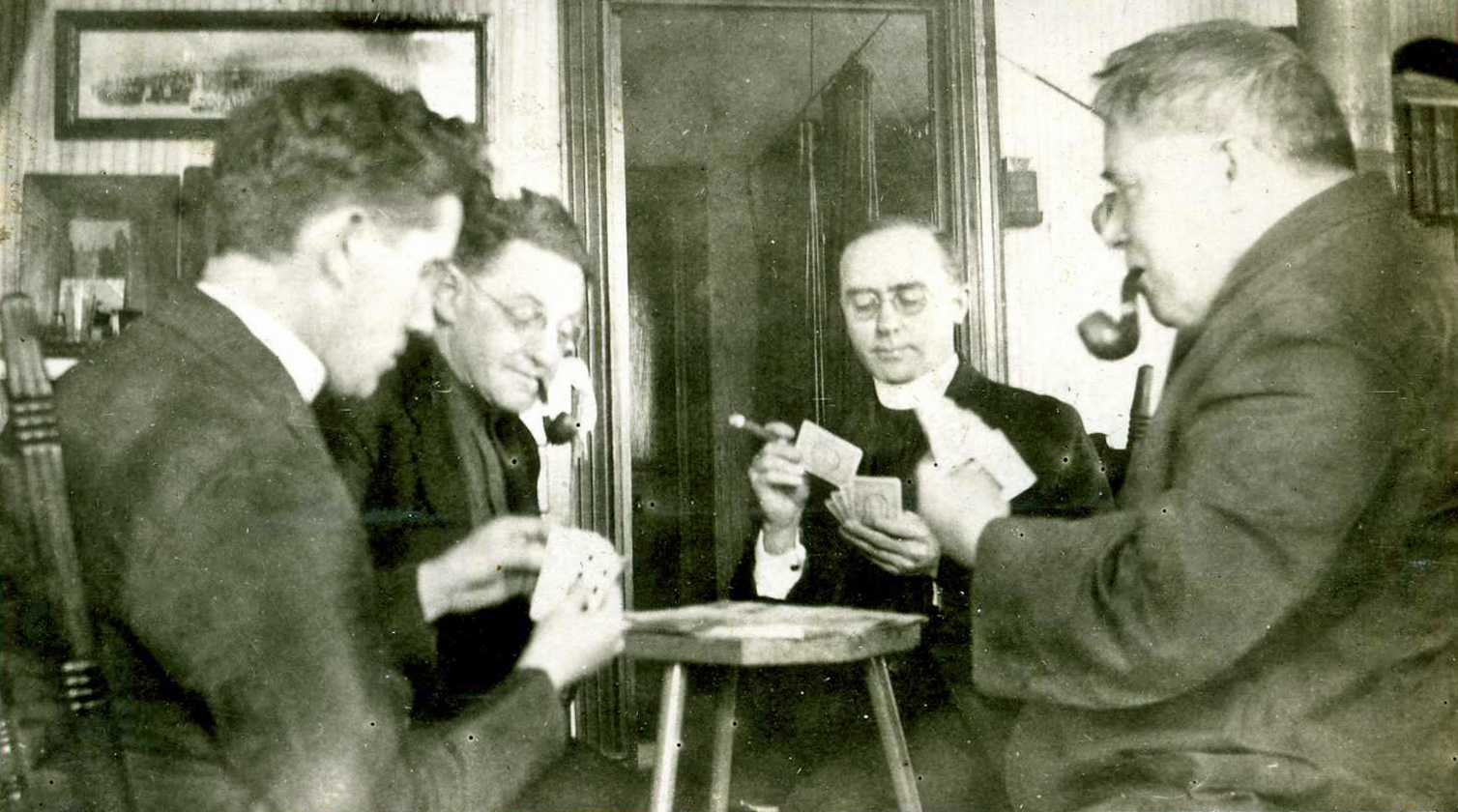

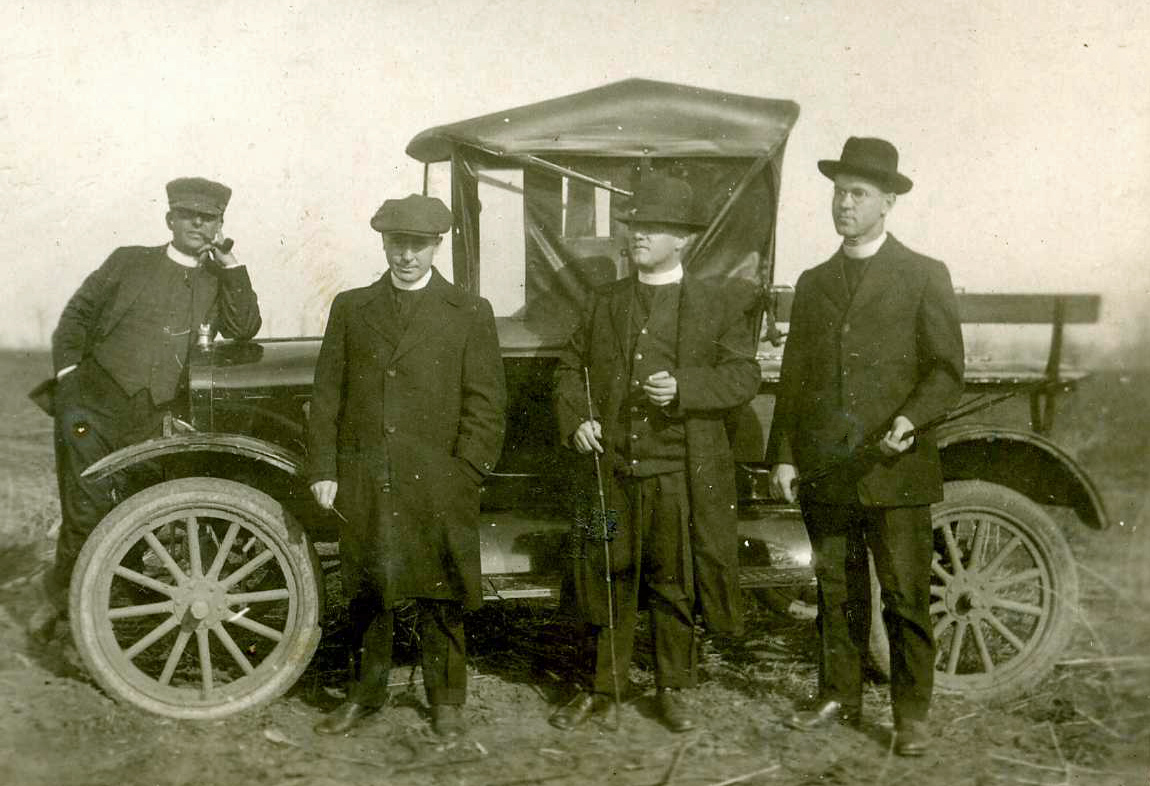

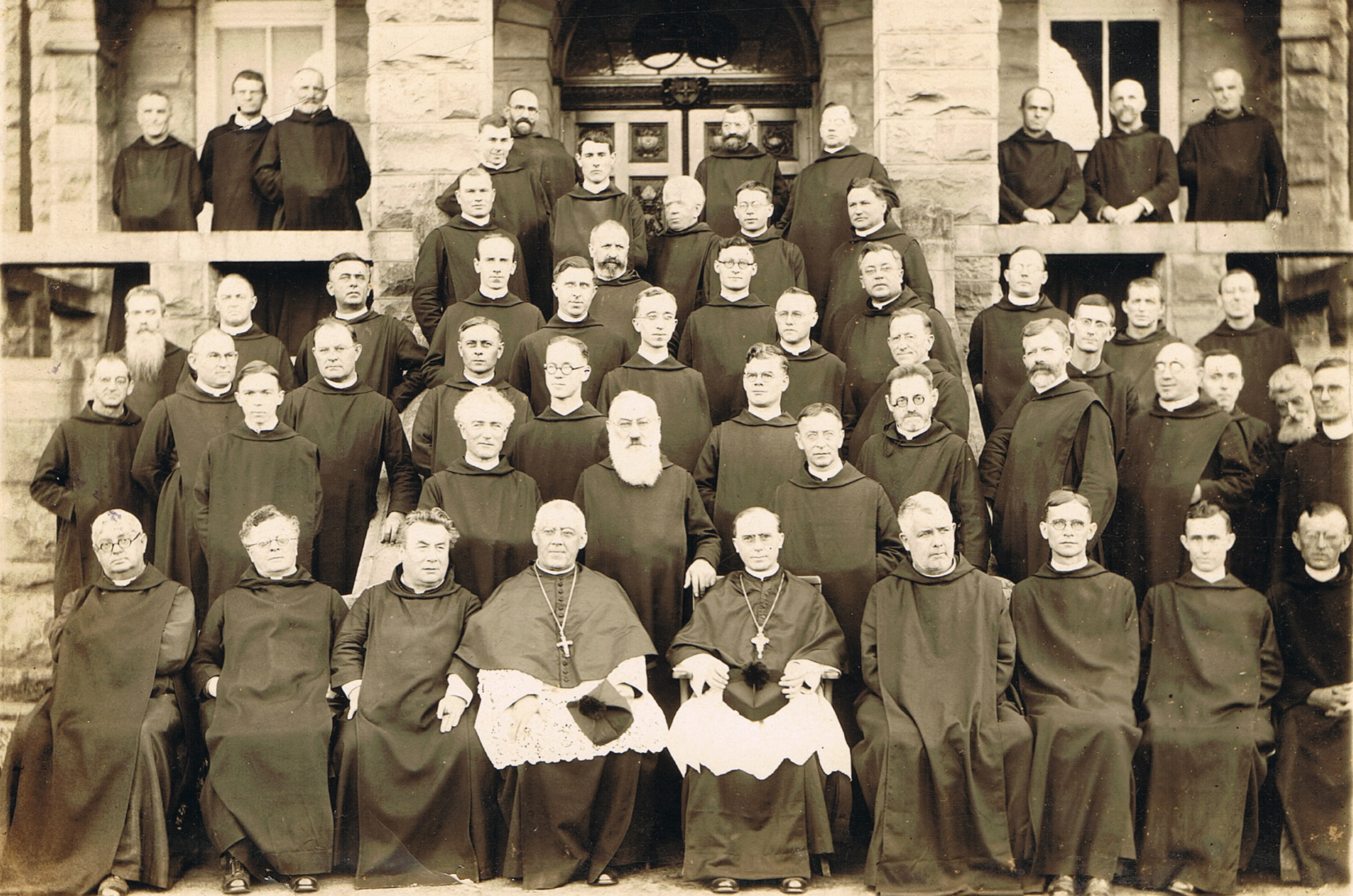

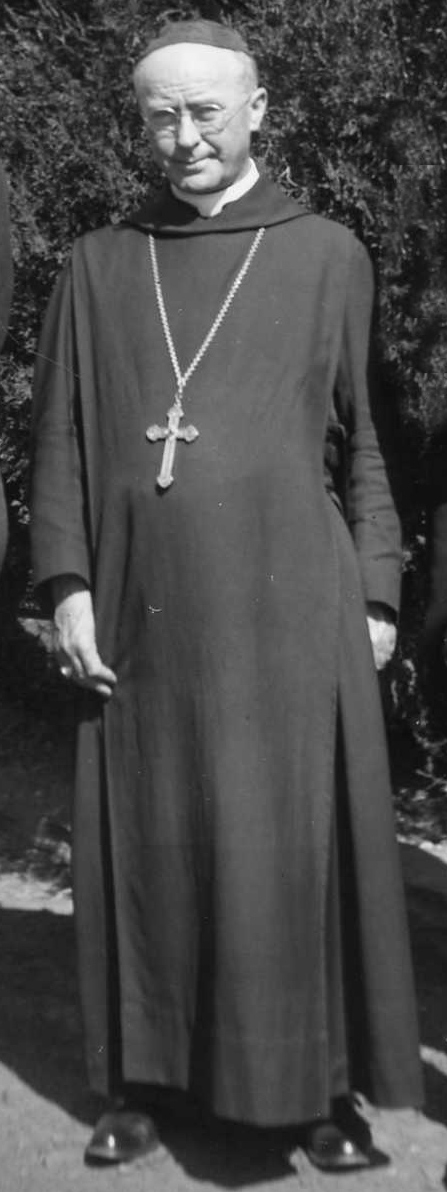

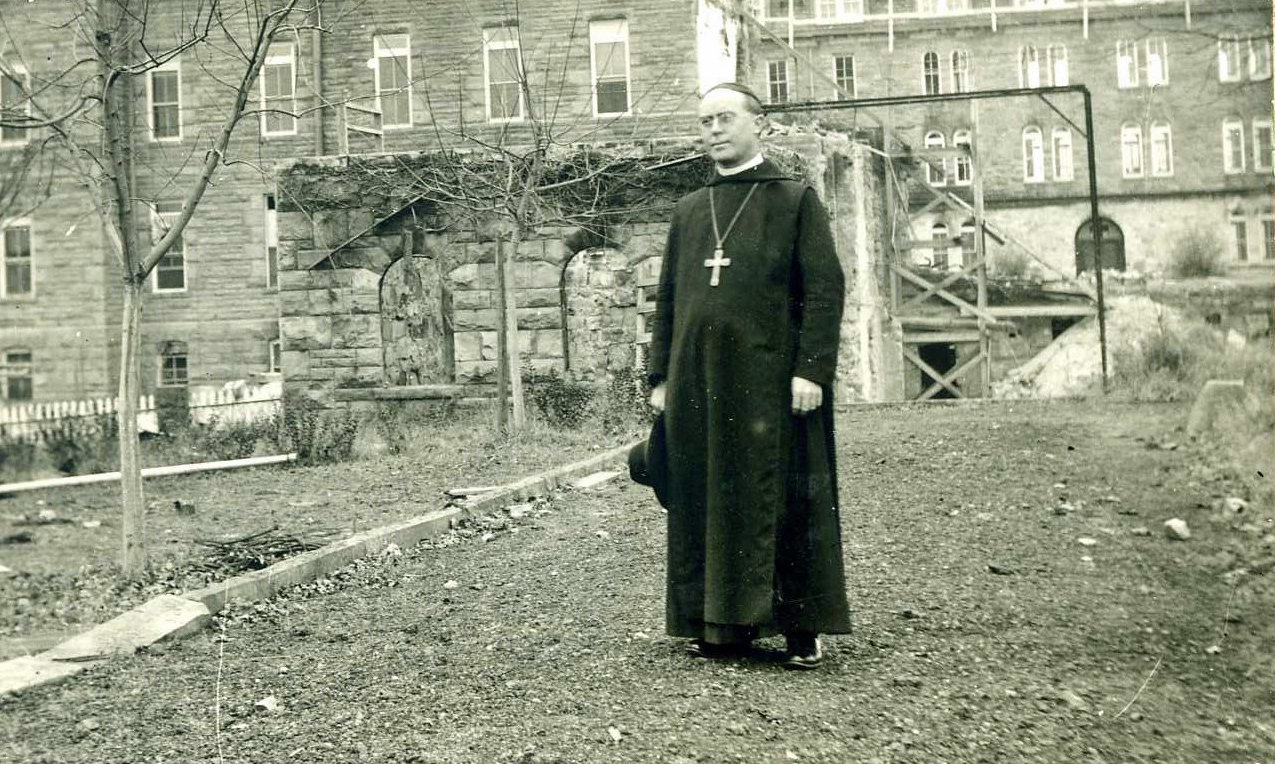

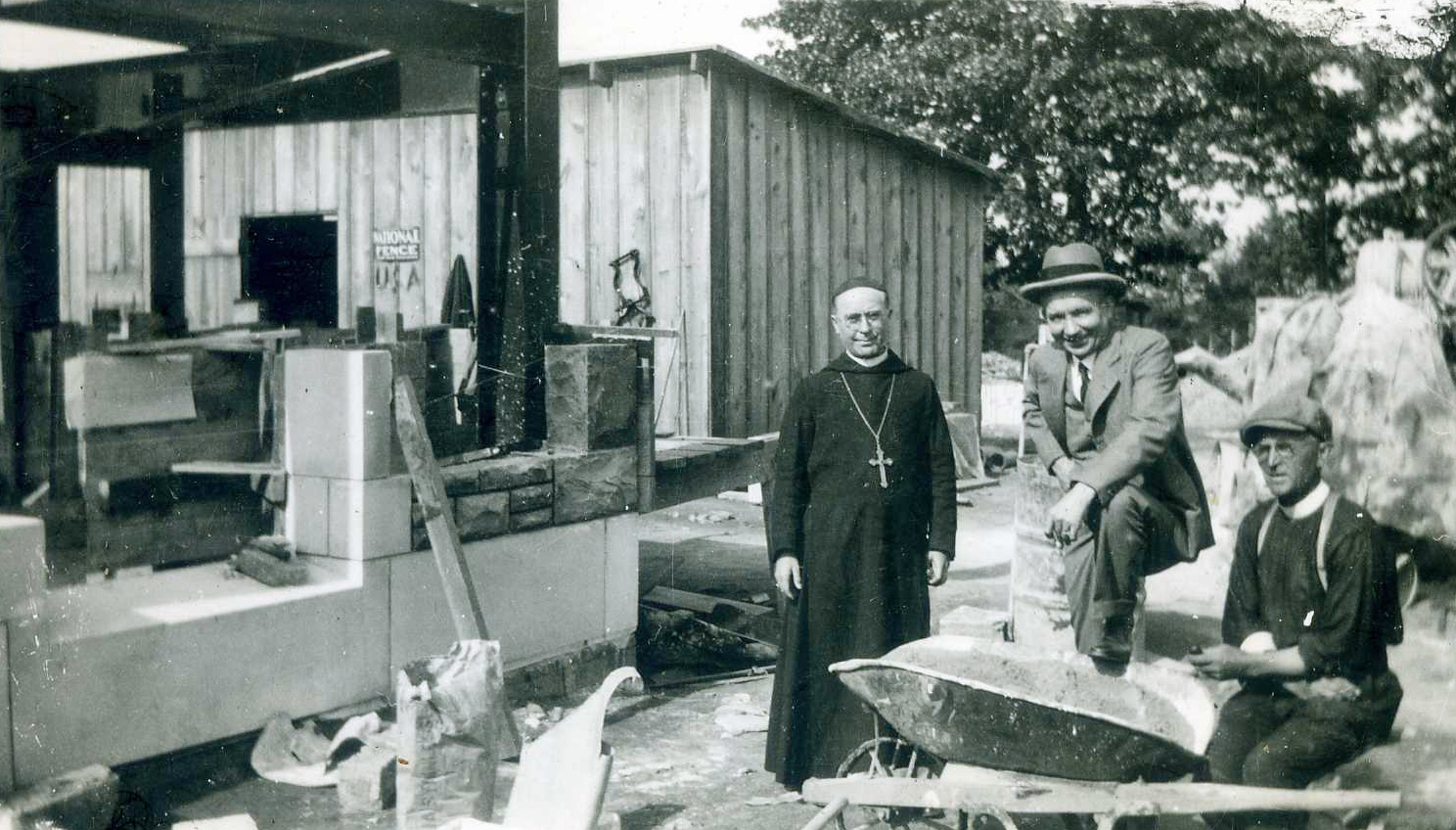

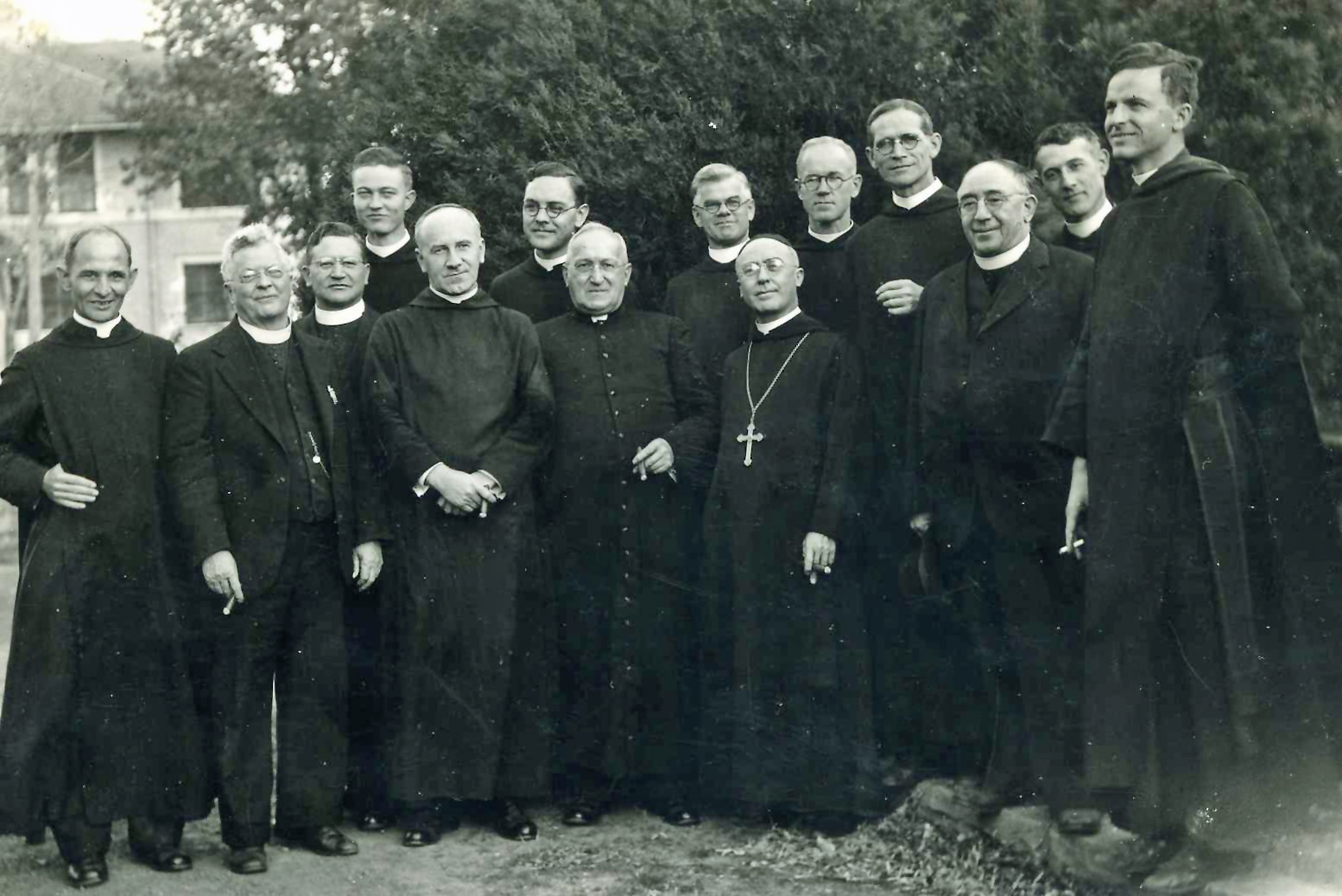

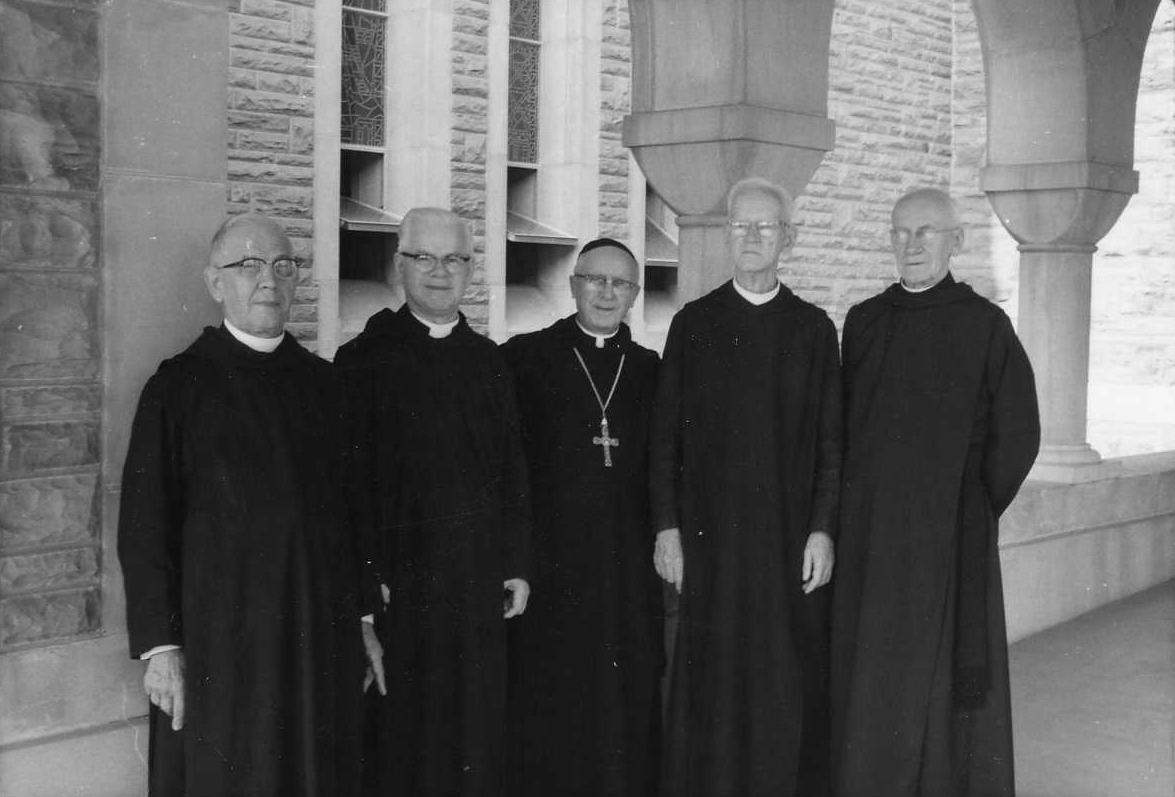

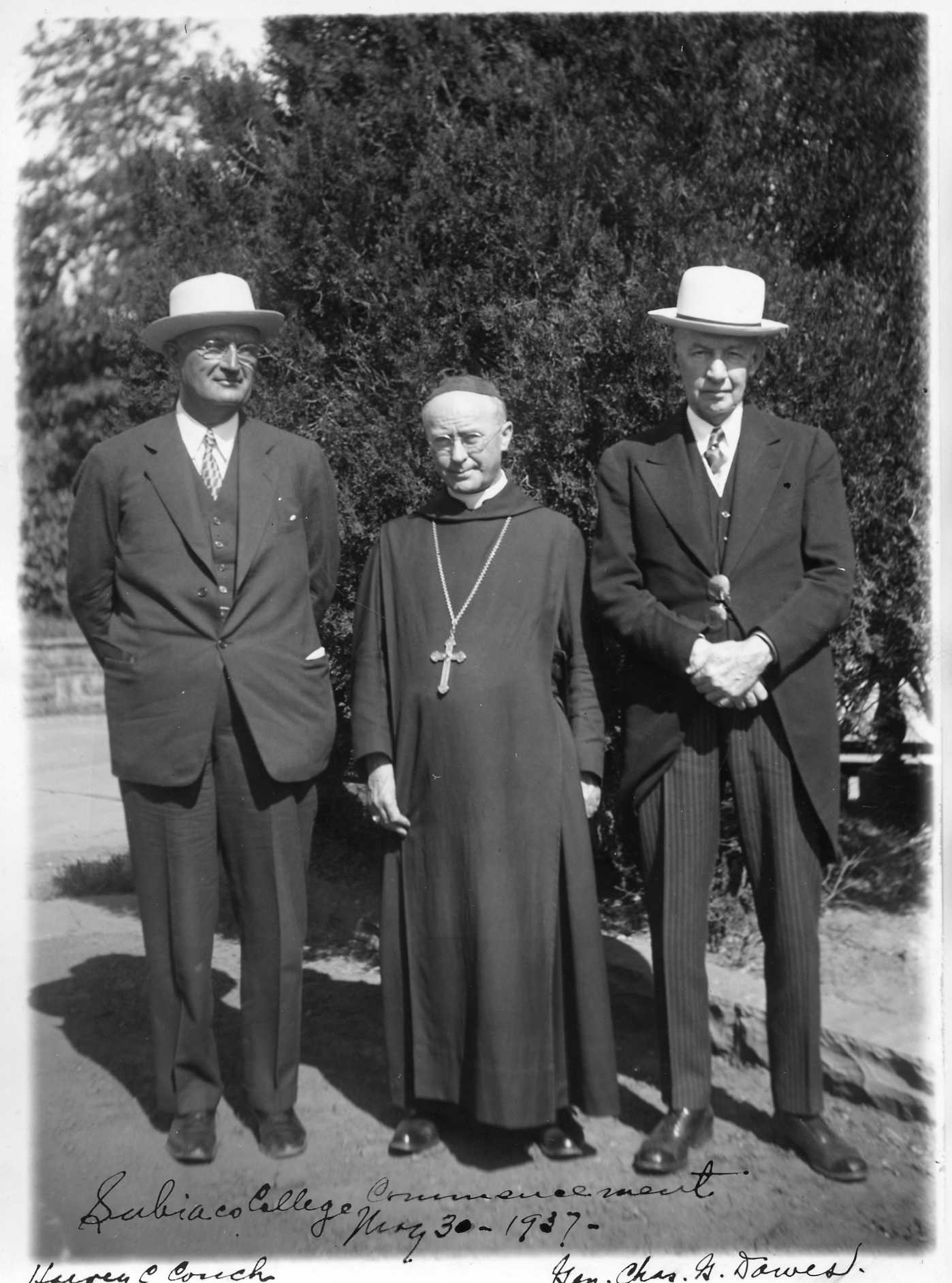
