= Michael Lensing =

Benedictine monk

The Right Reverend Michael Lensing OSB
- Abbot
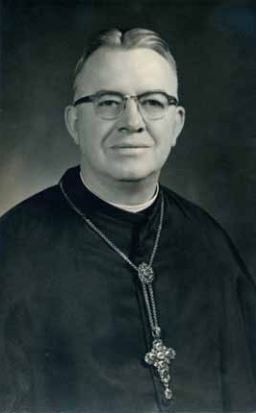
- Native name: William Lensing
- Elected: September 23, 1957

Orders
- Ordination: June 3, 1939 by Bishop John B. Morris
- Rank: Abbot

Personal details
- Born: January 10, 1916 Scranton, Arkansas
- Died: December 3, 1988 (aged 72) Subiaco, Arkansas
- Buried: Subiaco Abbey
- Denomination: Roman Catholic
- Parents: Caspar Lensing and Anna Heim
- Occupation: Abbot
- Profession: Benedictine Monk

Michael Lensing OSB (January 11, 1916 Scranton, Arkansas – December 3, 1988, Subiaco, Arkansas) was a Benedictine monk and the fourth Abbot of Subiaco Abbey in Arkansas.

== Early life ==
William Lensing was born in Scranton, Arkansas, on January 11, 1916, the son of Caspar Lensing and Anna Heim. After completing the elementary grades at St. Ignatius parish school in Scranton, he enrolled at Subiaco Academy, where he graduated in 1932 and continued his studies in the Abbey seminary.

== Monk, Priest, Abbot ==
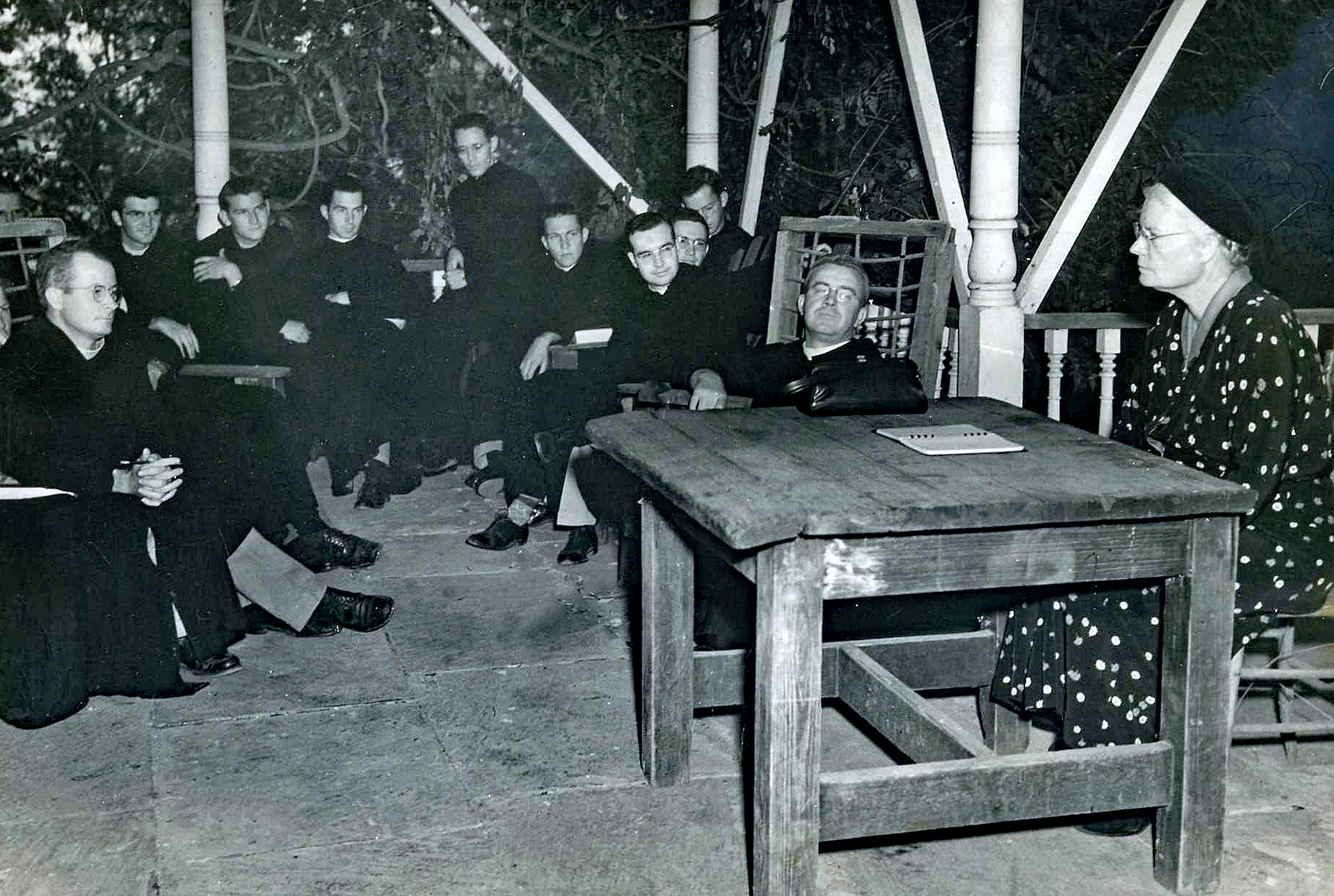
Dorothy Day Visit to Subiaco Abbey

He made his profession of vows on September 16, 1933, receiving the name Michael, and was ordained to the priesthood by Bishop John B. Morris on June 3, 1939. Father Michael taught in Subiaco Academy from 1939 to 1943. In 1940, he was appointed the first editor of the Abbey's newsletter, The Abbey Message, and continued in that role until 1957. From 1943 to 1954 he was also the director of the initial formation of new monks. From 1945 to 1948 he was director of the National Catholic Rural Life Conference. As seen in the photo, his work in the field of advocacy partnered him with such figures as Dorothy Day the noted co-founder of the Catholic Worker Movement.

Father Michael was elected fourth Abbot of Subiaco Abbey on September 23, 1957. He completed the construction of the Abbey Church which had been the dream of his predecessor, Abbot Paul Nahlen, and directed several building projects in the monastery and school. In 1961, the Abbey's foundation in south Texas was raised from a priory to Corpus Christi Abbey. The Abbey established missions in Nigeria, West Africa, in 1963, and later in Belize, Central America, in 1971. Abbot Michael guided the community through the renewal period after the Catholic Church's Second Vatican Council (1962-1965).

In January, 1970, Abbot Michael was diagnosed as having Parkinson's disease. By 1974, his health had been seriously impaired, and he resigned the office of Abbot on October 30, 1974. He set a new standard by putting aside the title and insignia of abbot and returning to the ranks of the community.

== Final years ==
Father Michael continued to weaken under the effects of Parkinson's disease and eventually moved to the Abbey's infirmary, where he died on December 30, 1988.

== Notability ==
Abbot Michael Lensing was well known not only in the Church and Civic venues of Arkansas, but also for his missionary outreach throughout the world. A few of his accomplishments would include:

- Served as the fourth Abbot and Ordinary of Subiaco Abbey. At the time of his retirement, the monastic community had grown to become the 39th largest Benedictine Abbey in the world with eight-four monks in final vows and three temporarily professed.
- Served from 1945 to 1948 as the director of the National Catholic Rural Life Conference. In this capacity, Father Michael would promote rural life causes on the local and national levels. Locally, this would include his work to establish a local Subiaco Credit Union and serving as Advisor to the Logan County Farmers Cooperative Association. In this position, he served as an advocate for rural electrification and petitioned before Congress for the needs of those outside urban areas.
- Committed to missions, he would establish priories in Nigeria in 1963 and Belize in 1971. The Nigerian mission began with seven monk missionaries and was known as Saint Mukasa Monastery, located near the beginning of the Niger River in Eleme, Nigeria. In 1967 the monks had to withdraw due to the Biafrim War. The mission in Belize would continue as Santa Familia Monastery until it was ultimately closed and entrusted to the Diocese of Belize in 2003.
- Completed the historic Catholic Church begun by his predecessor, Abbot Paul Nahlen. Other building projects on the grounds of Subiaco Abbey would be the completion of an Abbey Guest House known as Coury House, as well as a new monastic wing for the monastery. For Subiaco Academy he would oversee construction of a new dormitory, a football stadium, a library renovation, and an athletic center field house. These became vital for the expansion of the Academy as an International Boarding School with competing facilities.
- Due to his expansive work in founding two international missions, national social justice causes, and advocacy for farmers, he was listed as a member of the International Biography of Outstanding Benedictines: Biographia Benedictina.

== Gallery ==
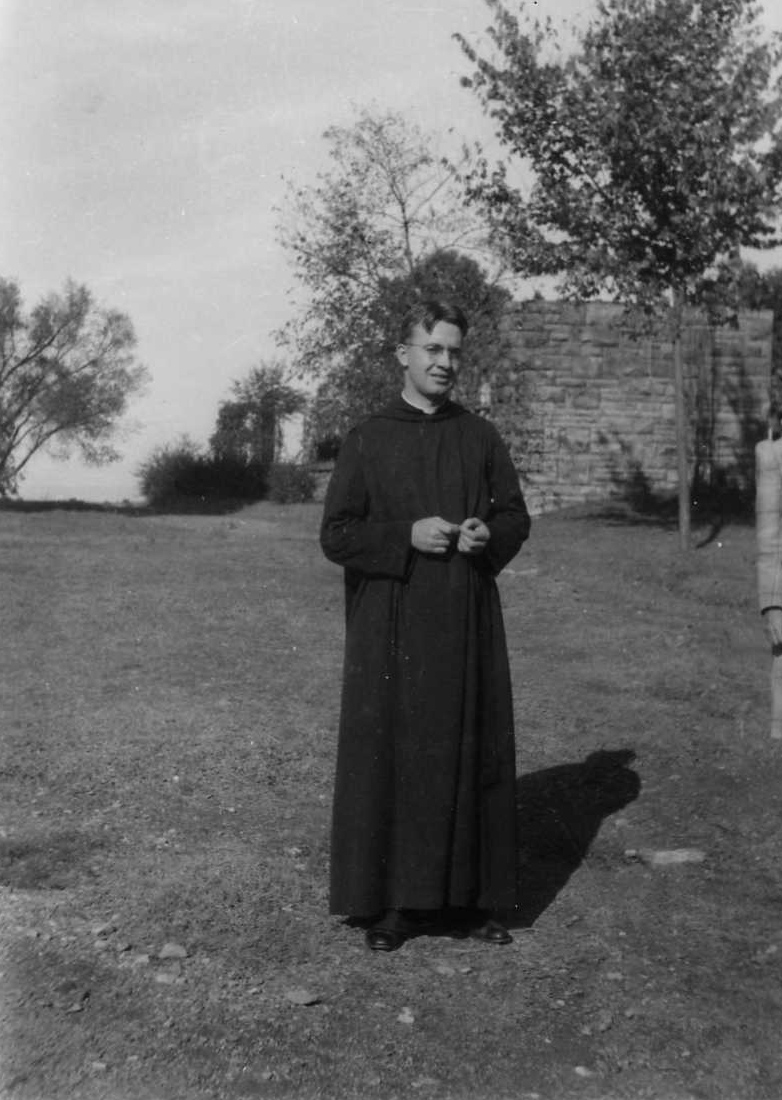

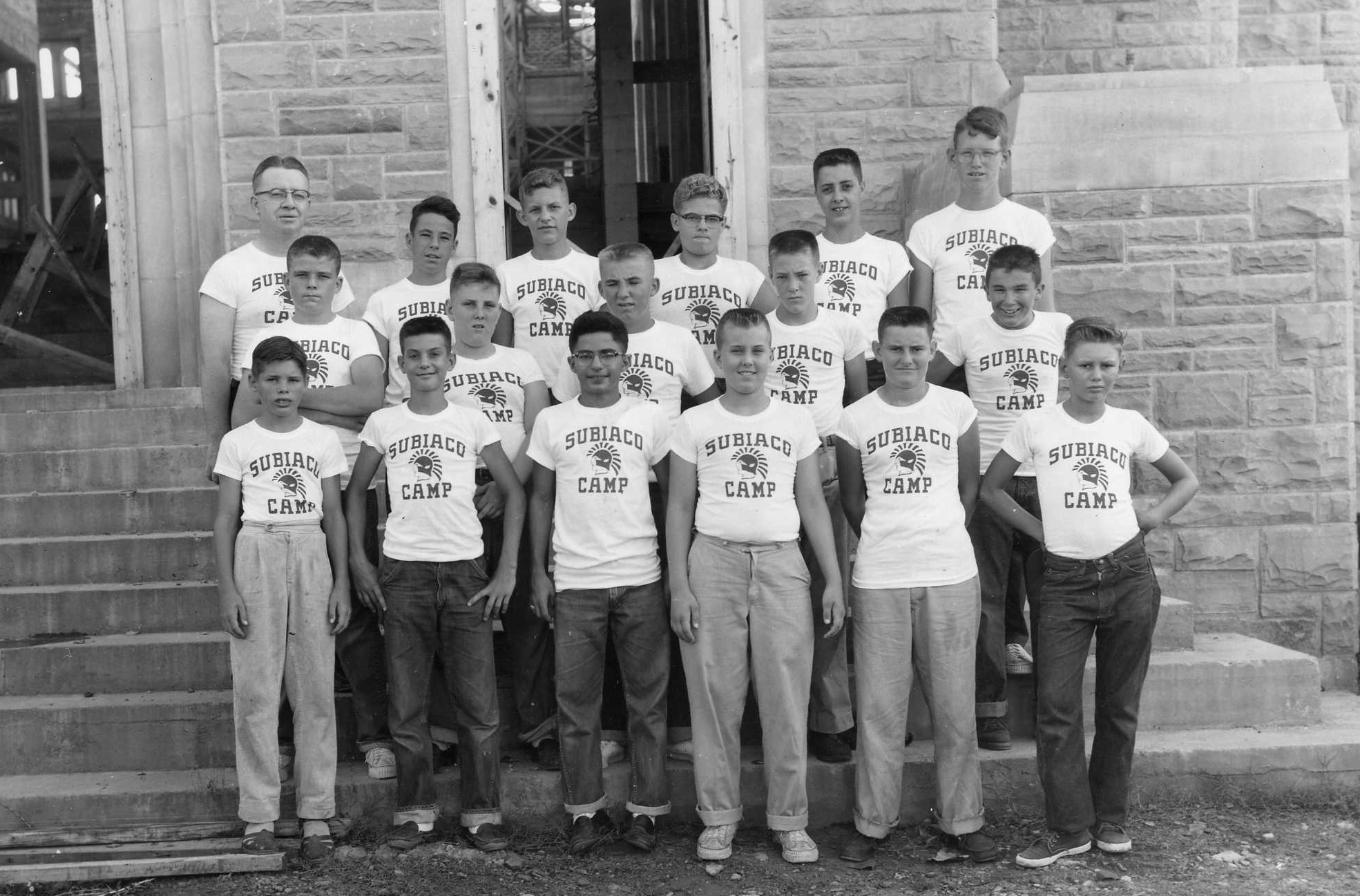

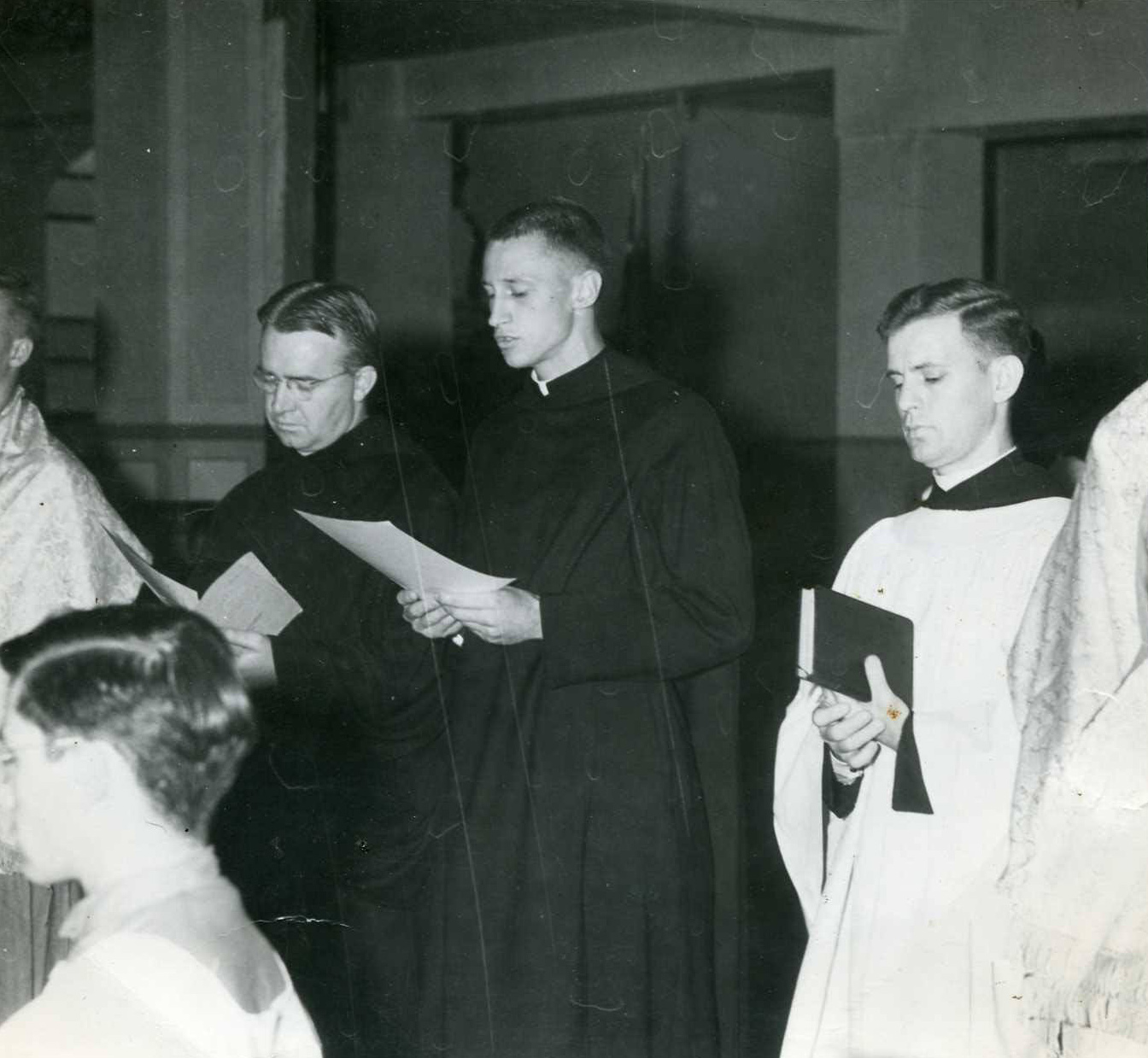

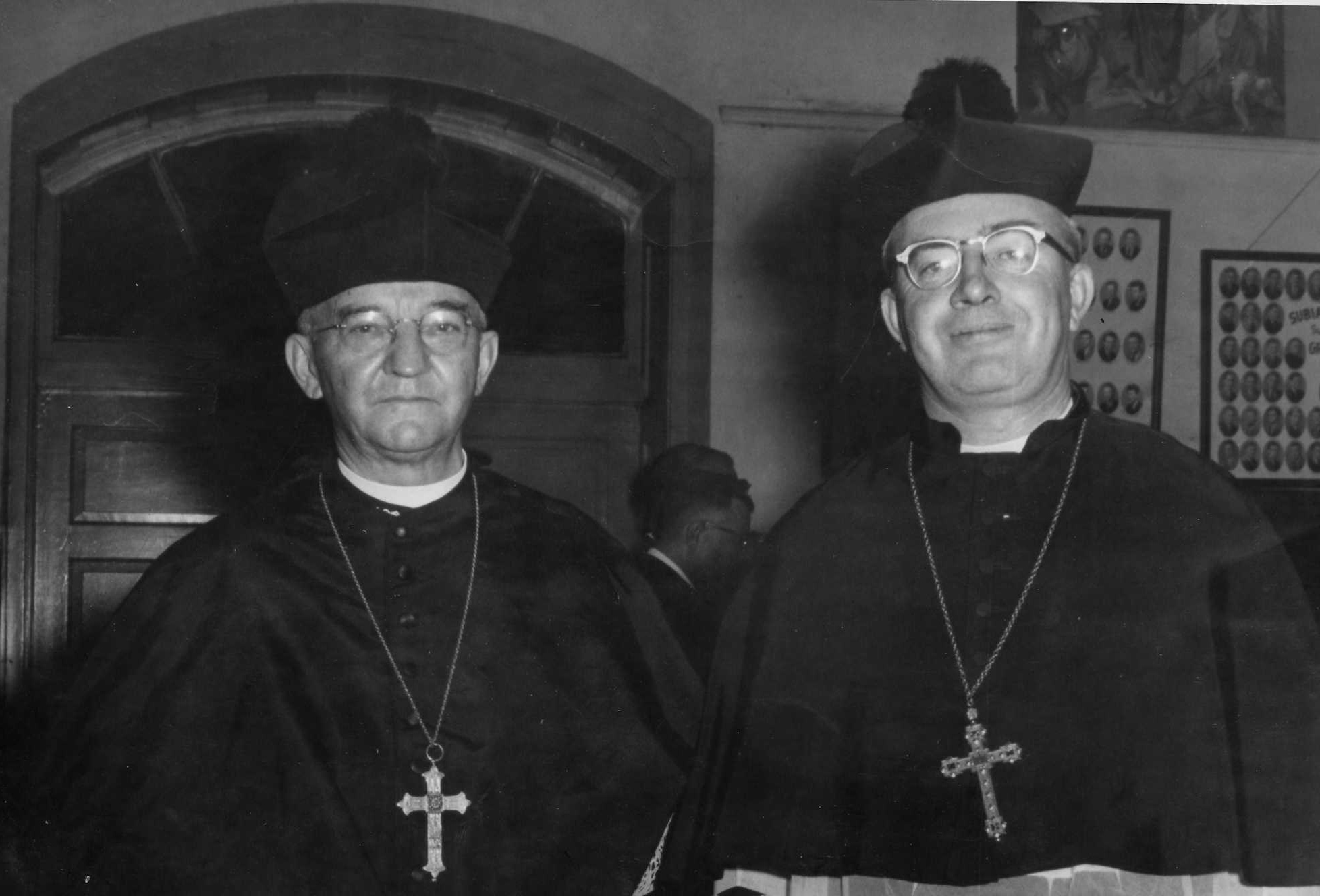

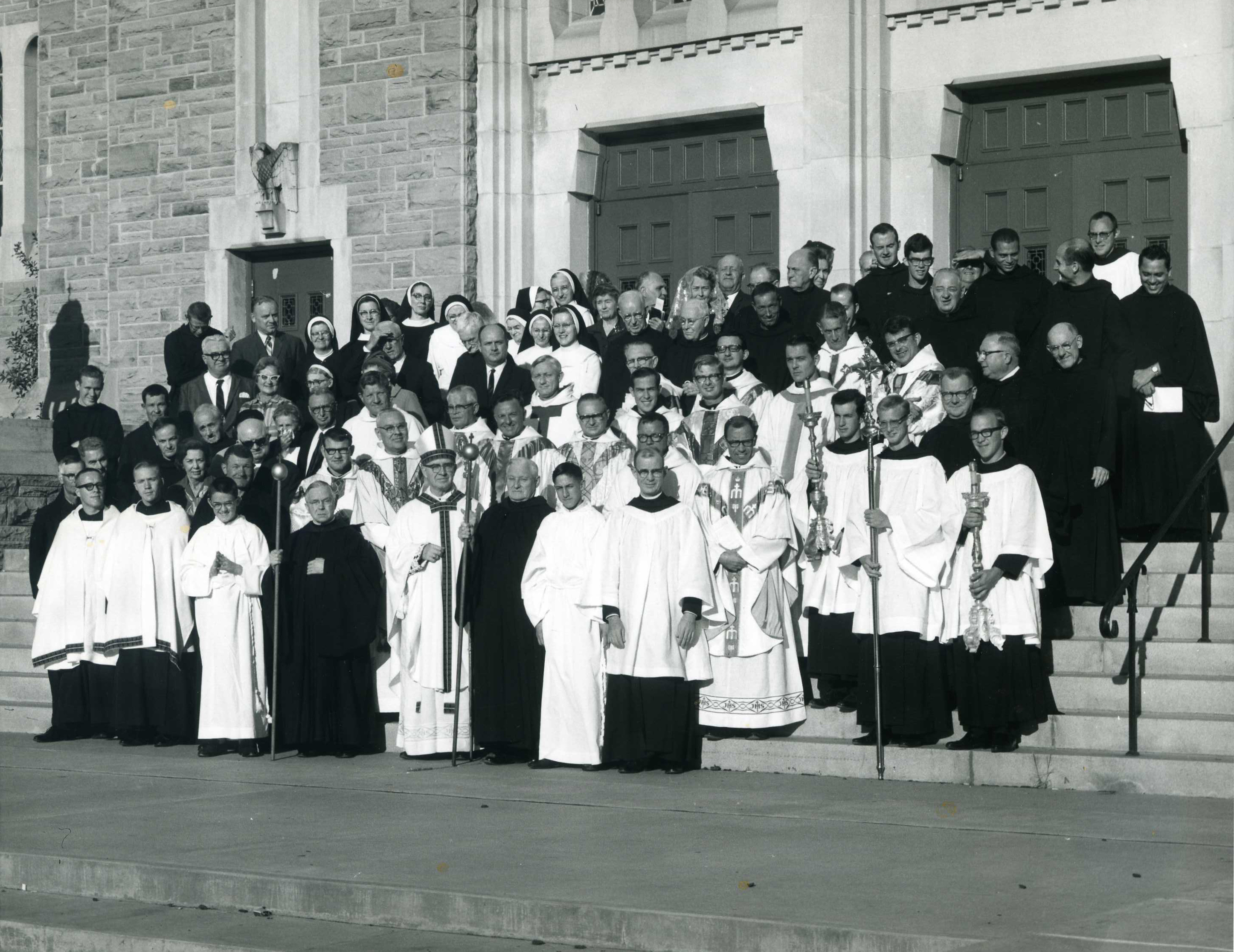

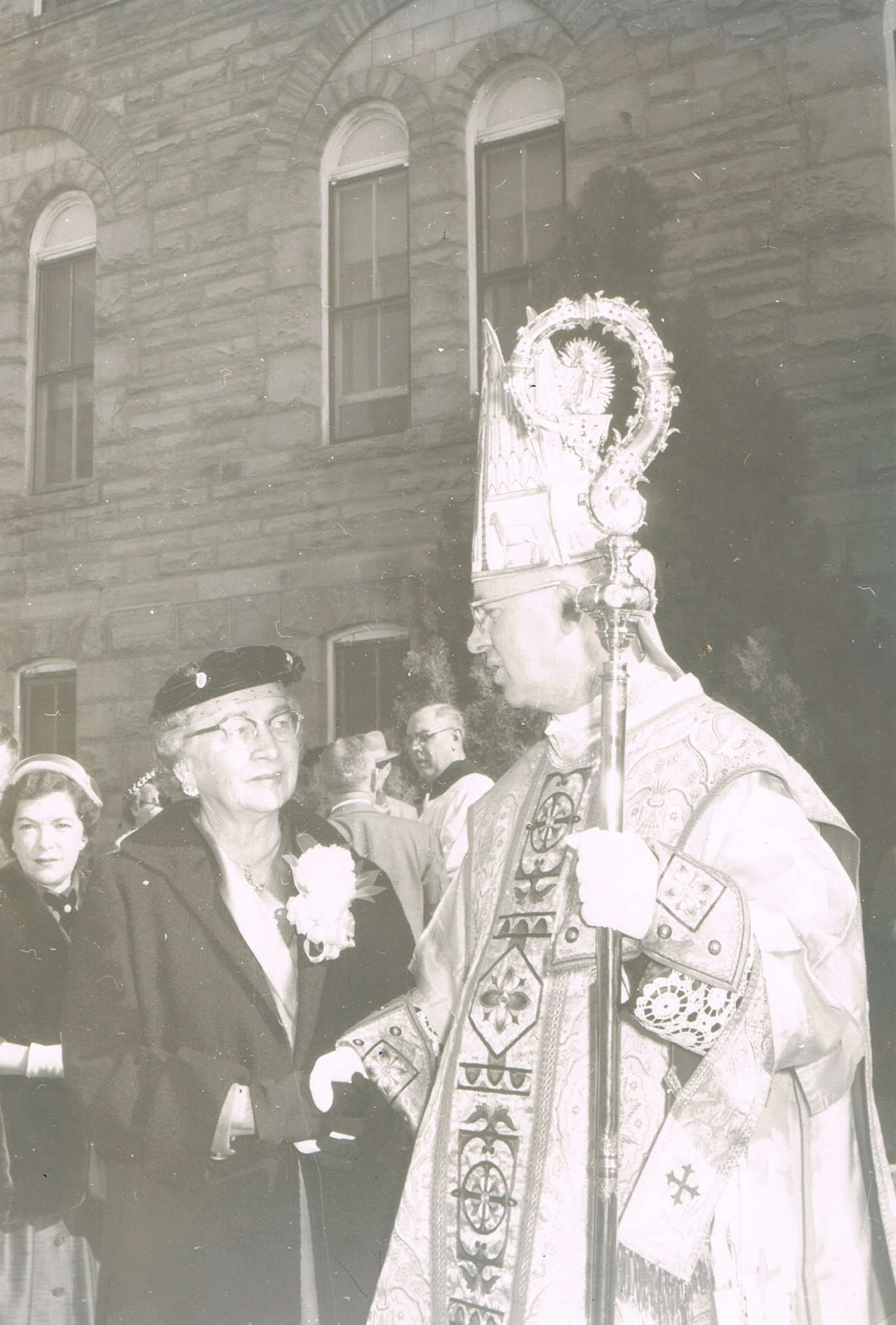

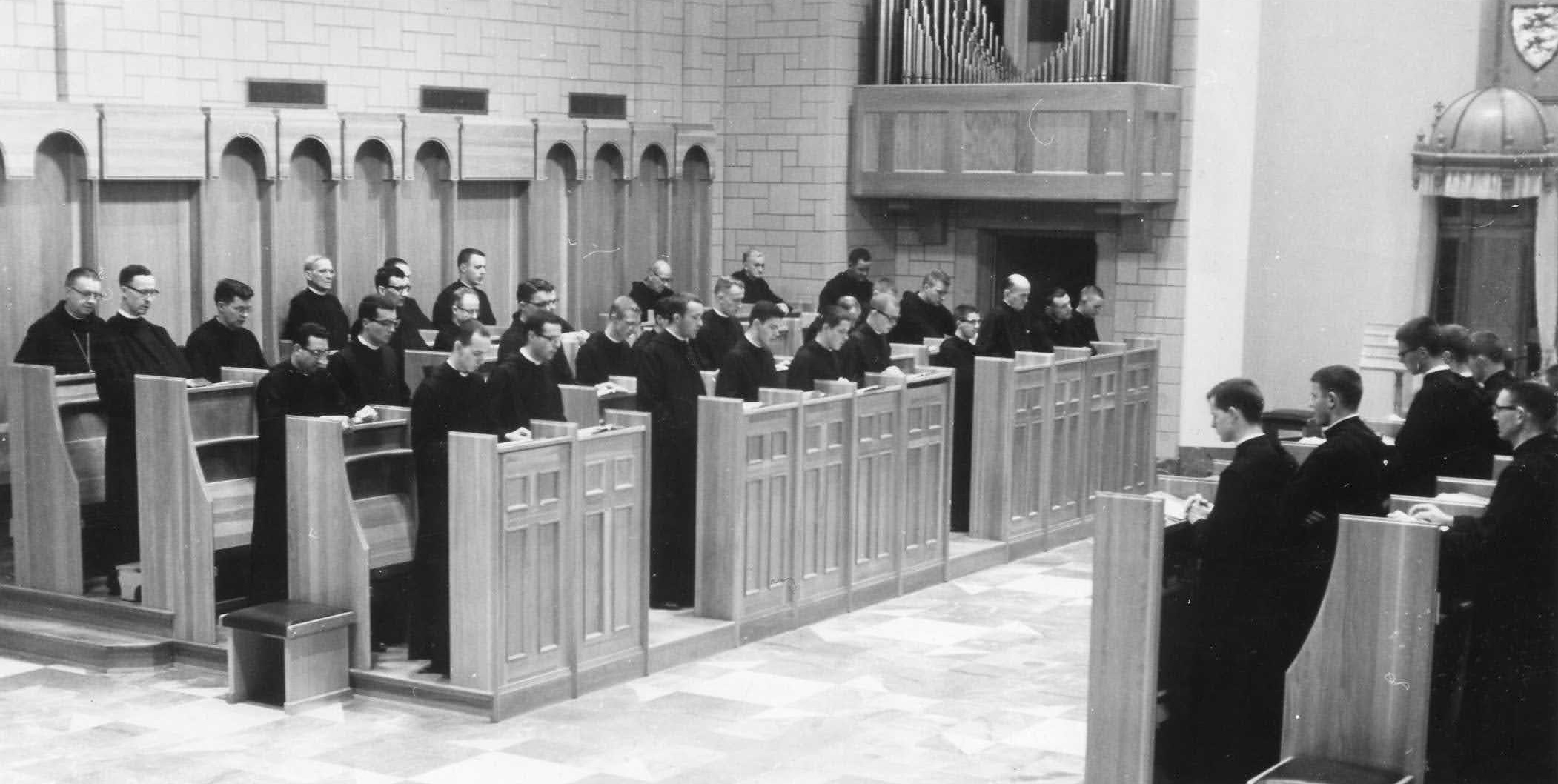

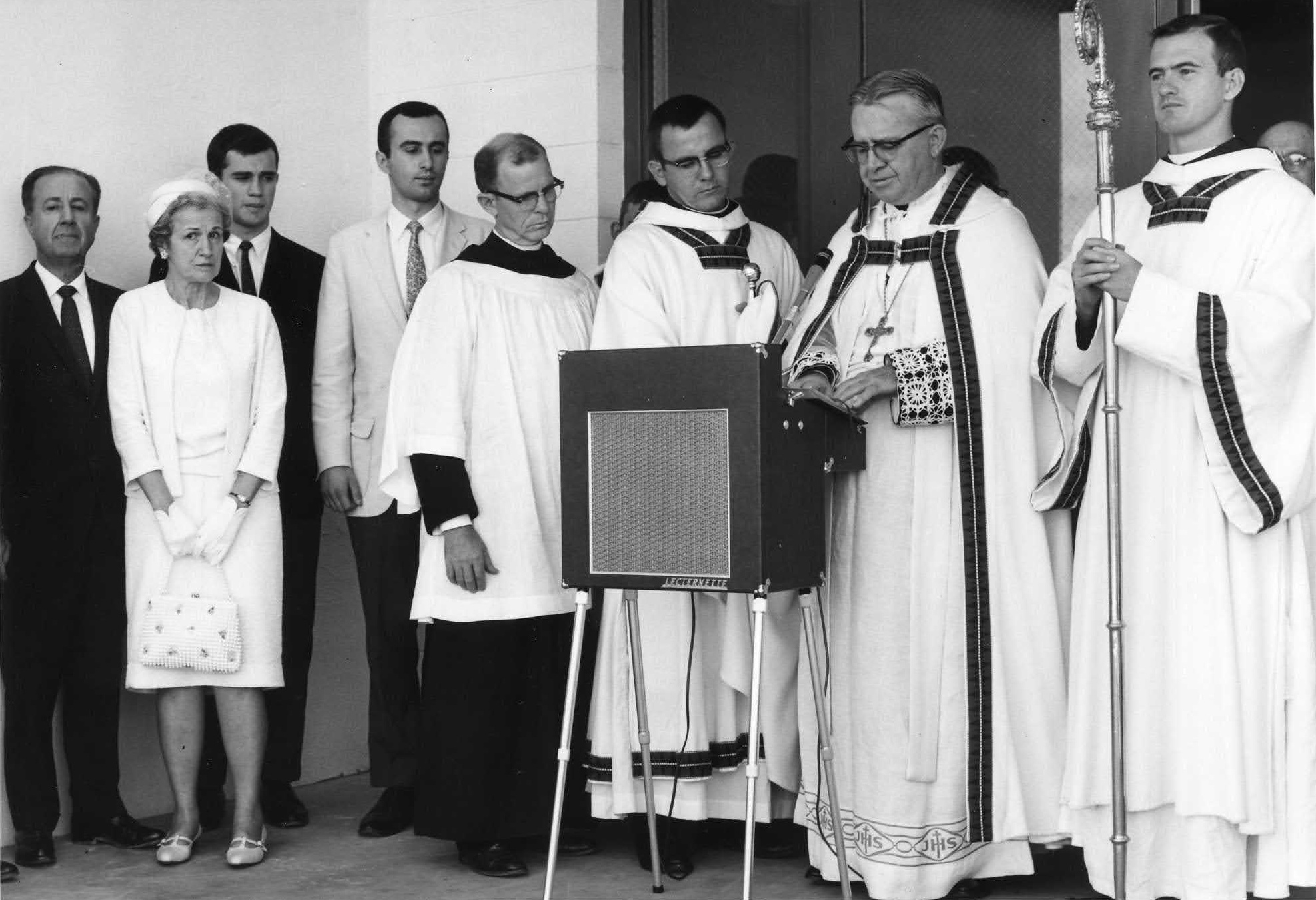

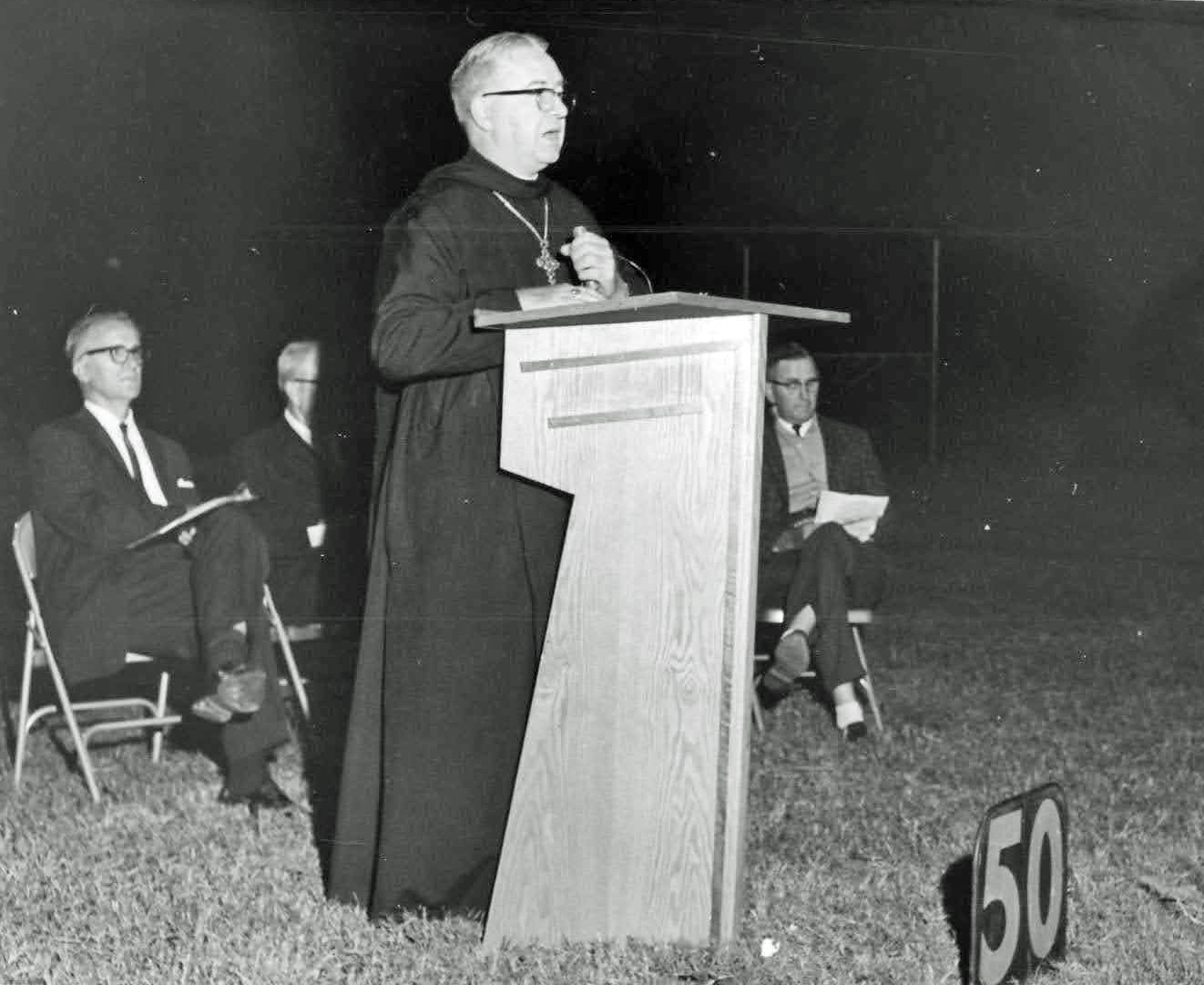

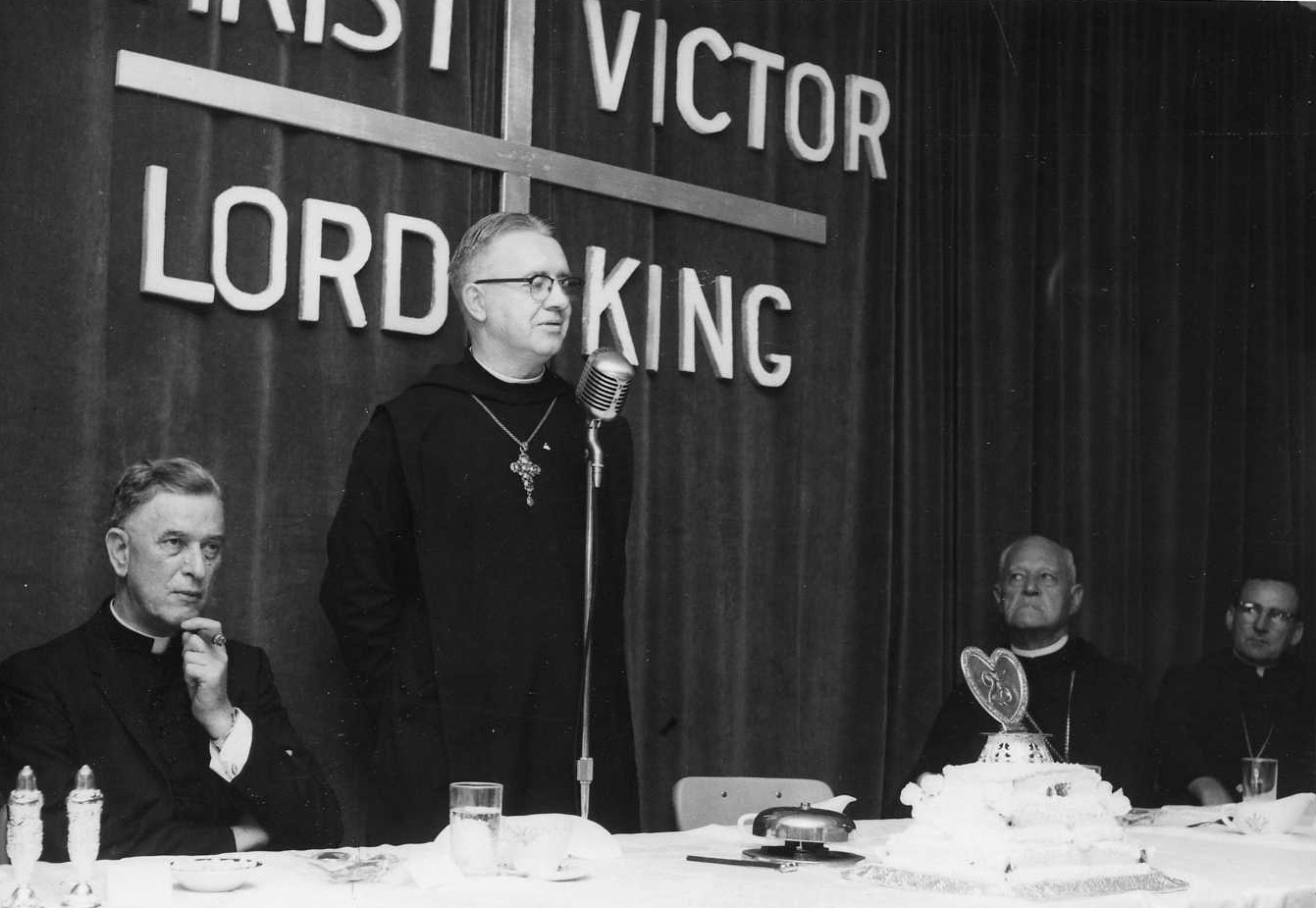

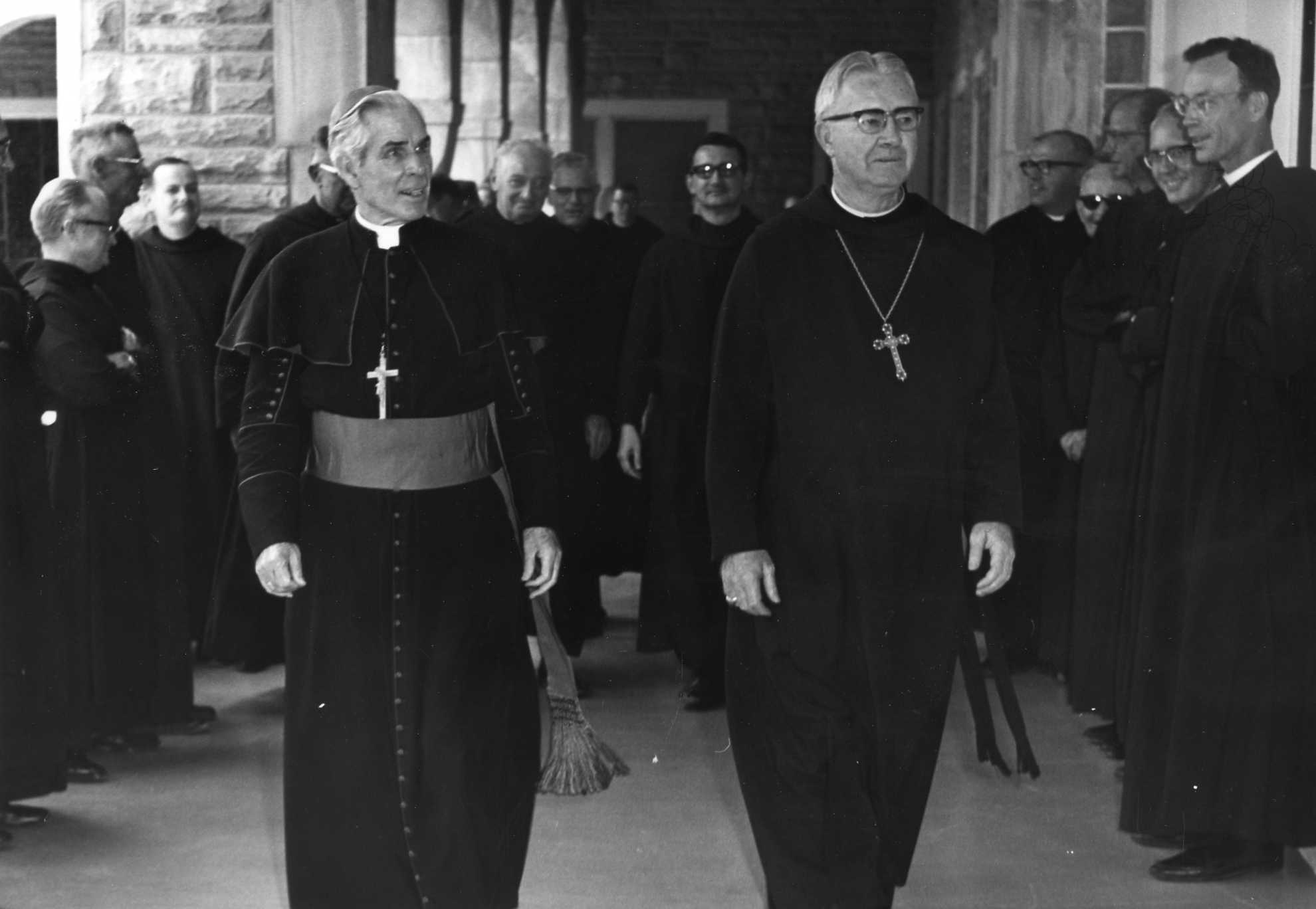

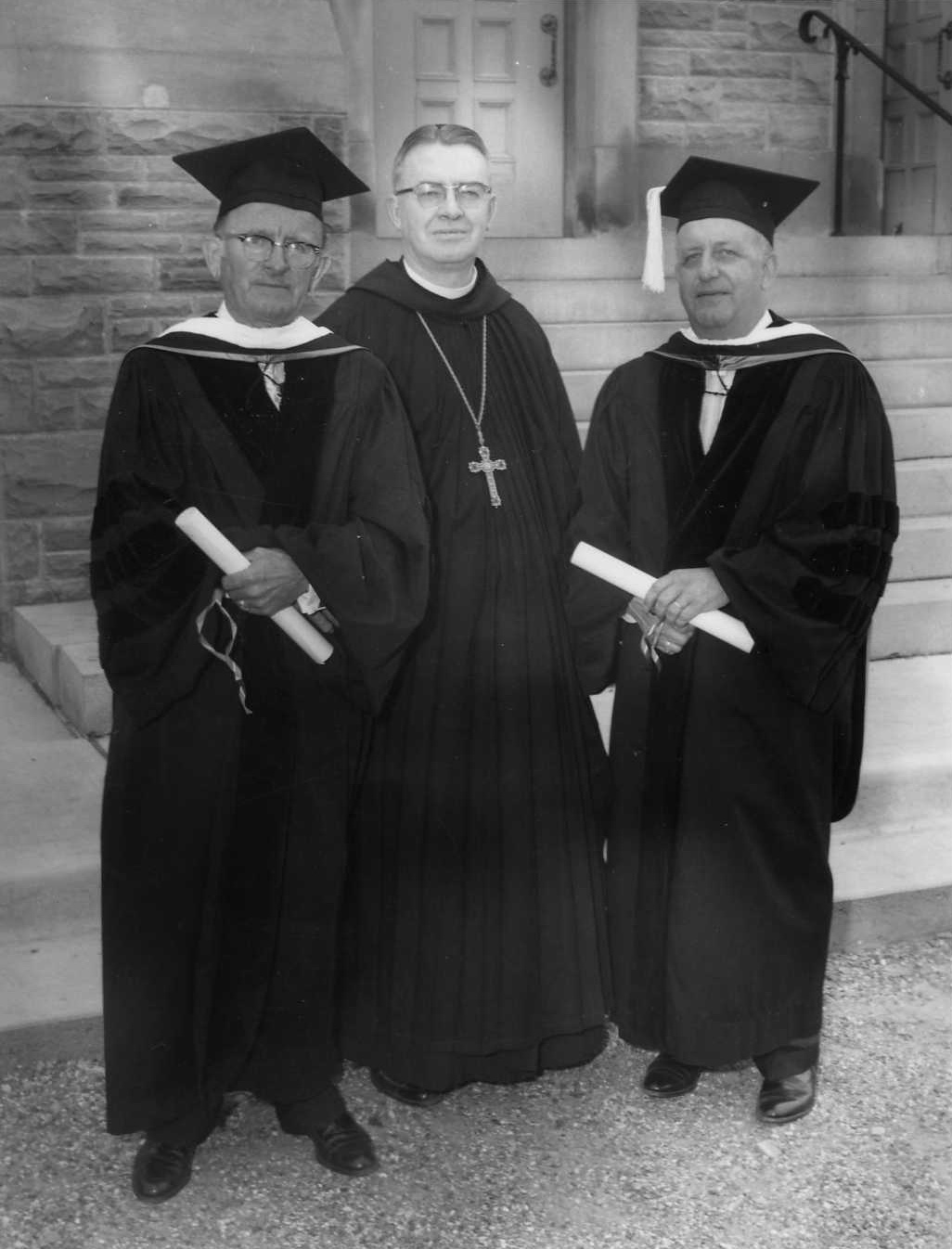

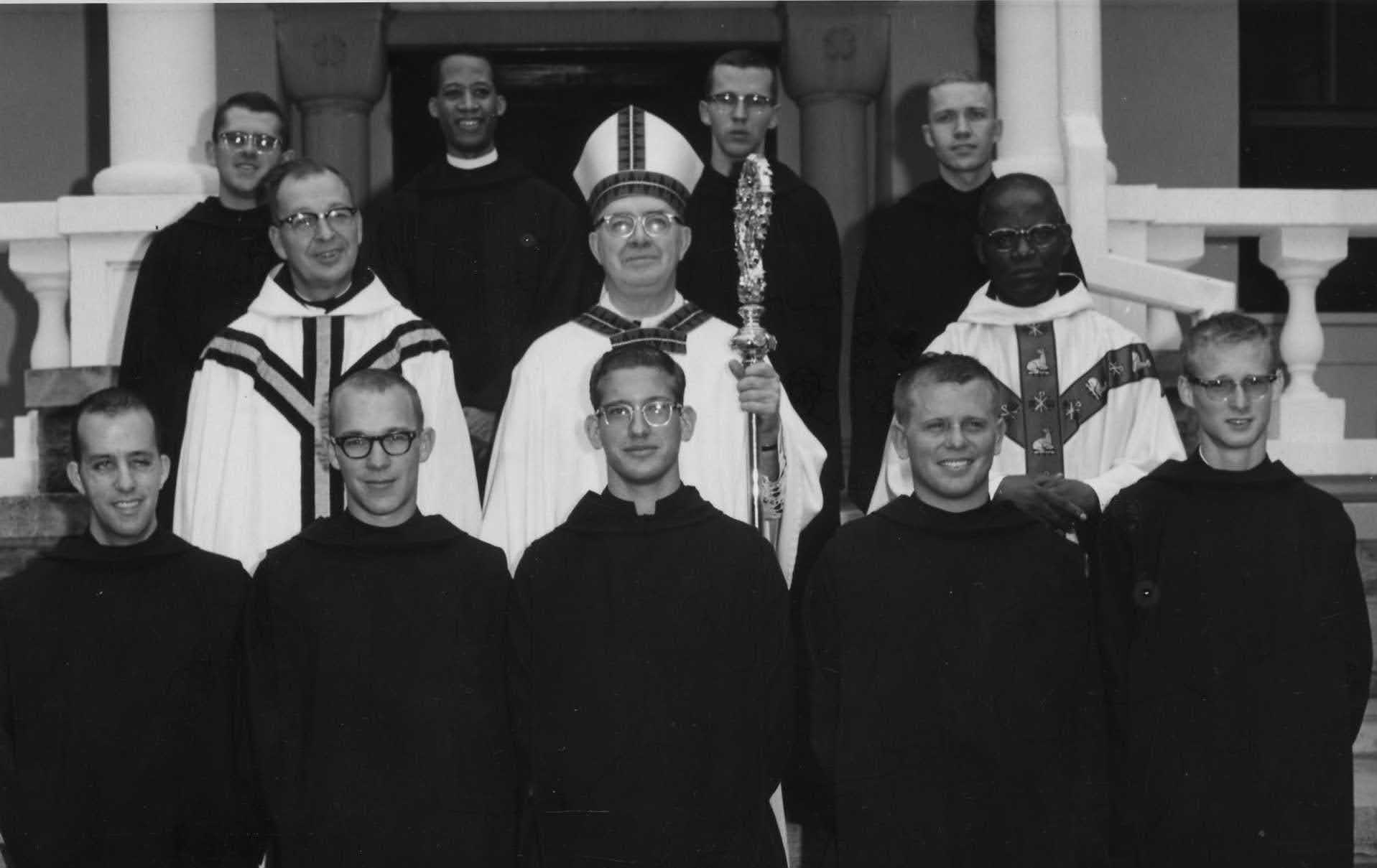

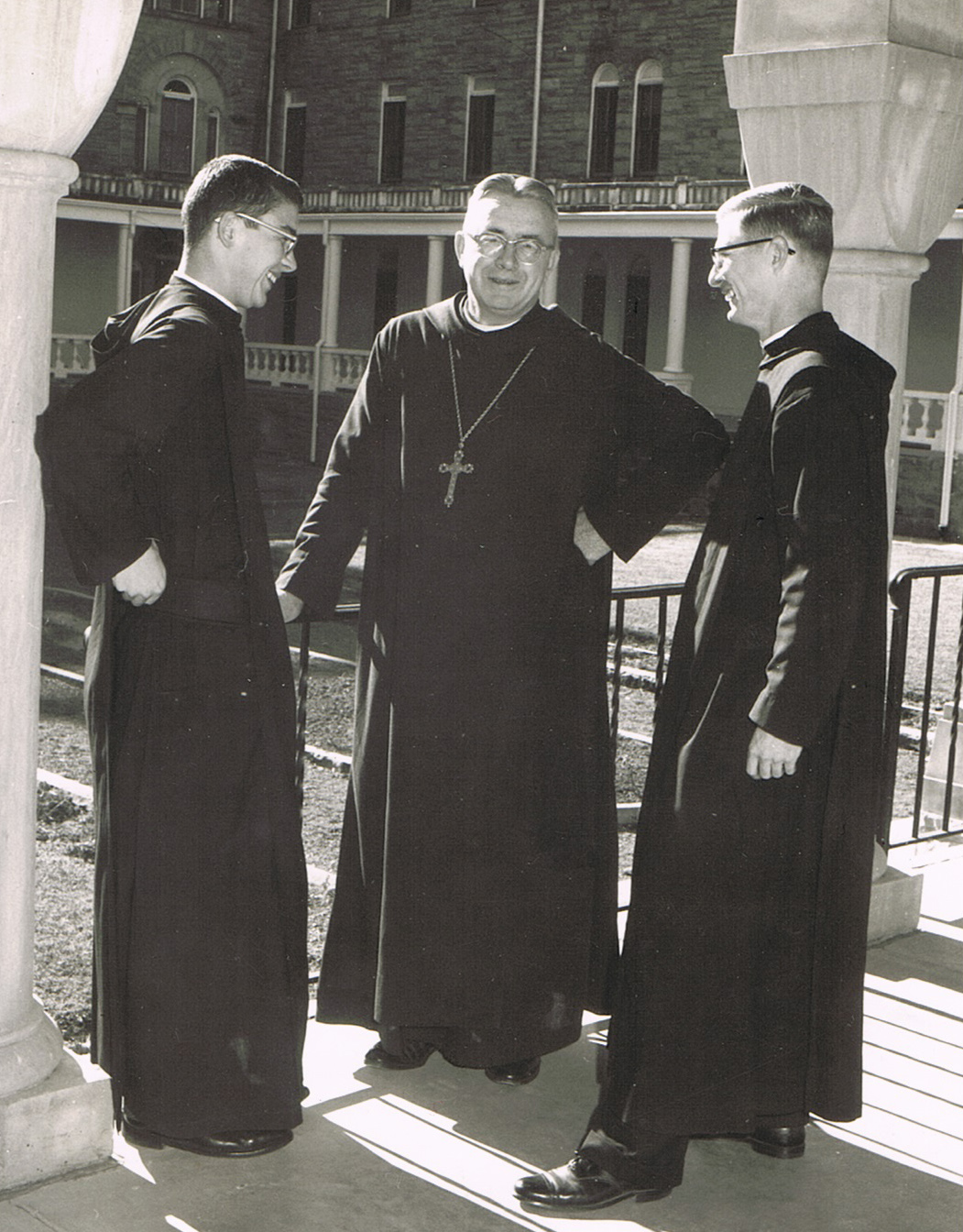

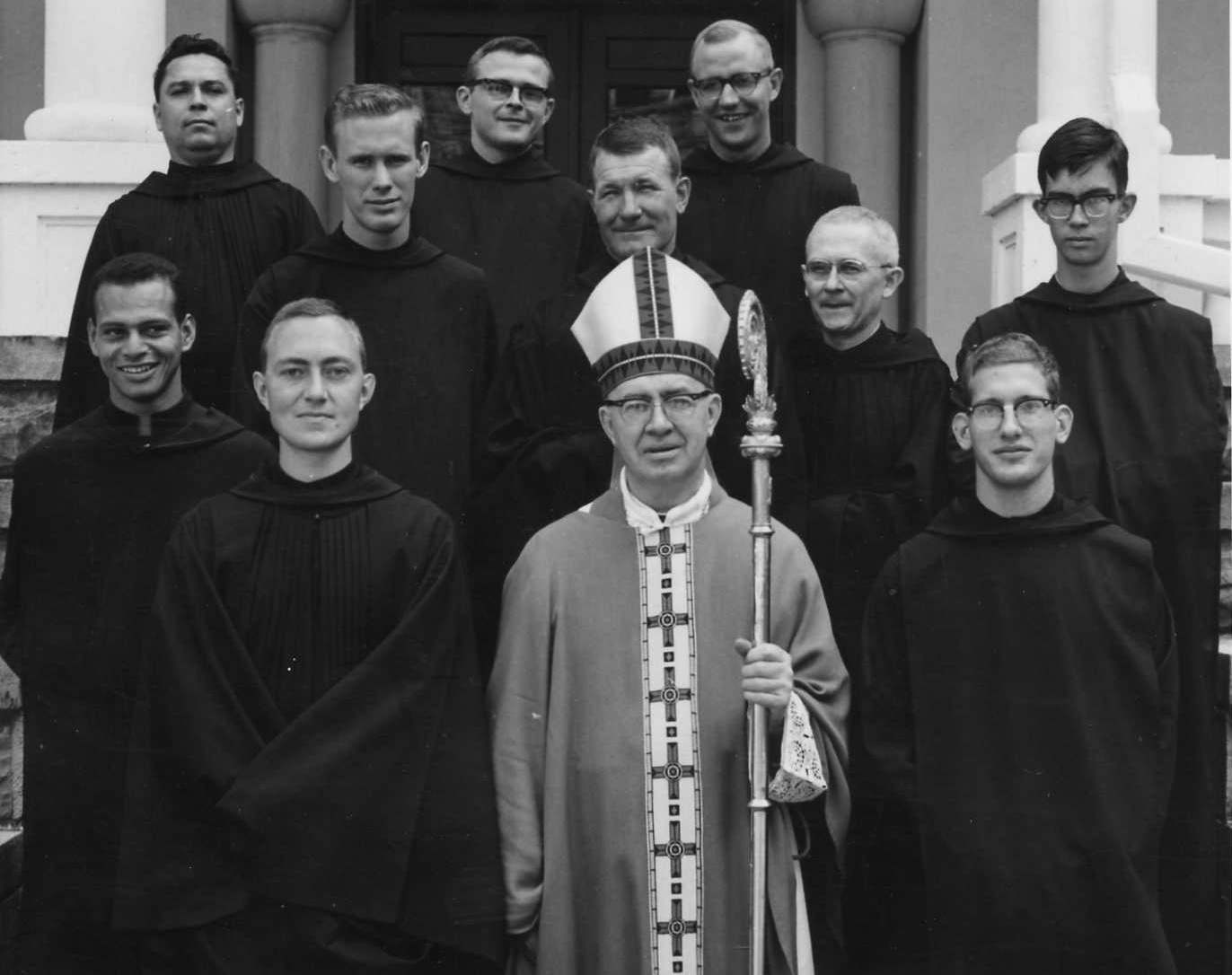
