= St. Joseph's Cathedral =

St. Joseph's Cathedral is the name of numerous cathedral churches that are named for Saint Joseph.

== Africa ==
=== Tanzania ===
- Saint Joseph's Cathedral, Dar es Salaam
- St. Joseph's Cathedral, Zanzibar

== Asia ==
=== China ===
- Wangfujing Cathedral or St. Joseph's Cathedral, Beijing
- St. Joseph's Cathedral, Chongqing
- St. Joseph's Cathedral, Guiyang
- St. Joseph's Cathedral, Wuhan
- St. Joseph's Cathedral of Tianjin

=== India ===
- An alternative name for St. Philomena's Cathedral, Mysore
- St. Joseph's Cathedral, Allahabad
- St Joseph's Cathedral, Hyderabad
- St. Joseph's Cathedral, Trivandrum
- St. Joseph the Worker Cathedral, Raiganj
- St. Joseph's Cathedral, Imphal

=== Indonesia ===
- St. Joseph's Cathedral, Pontianak

=== Iraq ===
- Cathedral of Saint Joseph, Ankawa
- Latin Cathedral of St. Joseph, Baghdad

=== Japan ===
- Old Cathedral of St. Joseph, Tokyo

=== Myanmar ===
- St. Joseph's Cathedral, Taunggyi

=== Pakistan ===
- St. Joseph's Cathedral, Rawalpindi

=== Philippines ===
- Cathedral of St. Joseph the Patriarch, Alaminos City
- Balanga Cathedral or St. Joseph Cathedral, Balanga City
- Cathedral of St. Joseph, Romblon
- St. Joseph Cathedral, San Jose, Nueva Ecija
- Cathedral of St. Joseph the Worker, San Jose, Occidental Mindoro
- Cathedral of St. Joseph the Worker, Tagbilaran
- Saint Joseph Cathedral, San Jose de Buenavista, Antique

=== Syria ===
- Cathedral of Saint Joseph, Aleppo

=== Vietnam ===
- Saint Joseph Cathedral (Hanoi)

== Europe ==
=== Bulgaria ===
- Cathedral of St Joseph, Sofia

=== Latvia ===
- St. Joseph Cathedral, Liepāja

=== Netherlands ===
- St. Joseph Cathedral, Groningen

=== Romania ===
- Cathedral of St. Joseph, Bucharest

=== United Kingdom ===
- St Joseph's Cathedral, Swansea, Wales

== North America ==
=== Canada ===
- St. Joseph's Basilica, Edmonton (St. Joseph's Cathedral Basilica), Alberta
- St. Joseph Cathedral (Gatineau), Quebec
- Saint-Joseph Cathedral, Rouyn-Noranda, Quebec

=== Costa Rica ===
- Metropolitan Cathedral of San José

=== United States ===
- St. Joseph Cathedral (Buffalo, New York)
- St. Joseph Cathedral (San Diego, California)
- Cathedral Basilica of St. Joseph (San Jose), California
- Cathedral of St. Joseph (Hartford, Connecticut)
- Basilica of St. Joseph Proto-Cathedral, Bardstown, Kentucky, listed on the National Register of Historic Places as "St. Joseph Cathedral and College Complex"
- St. Joseph Cathedral (Baton Rouge, Louisiana), listed on the NRHP in Louisiana
- St. Joseph Co-Cathedral (Thibodaux, Louisiana), listed on the NRHP in Louisiana
- Cathedral of Saint Joseph (Jefferson City, Missouri)
- Cathedral of St. Joseph (St. Joseph, Missouri)
- Cathedral of St. Joseph (Manchester, New Hampshire)
- St. Joseph Cathedral (Bayonne, New Jersey)
- St. Joseph Pro-Cathedral (Camden, New Jersey)
- Co-Cathedral of St. Joseph (Brooklyn), New York
- St. Joseph Cathedral (Columbus, Ohio)
- St. Joseph Old Cathedral (Oklahoma City), listed on the NRHP in Oklahoma
- St. Joseph Cathedral (Sioux Falls, South Dakota)
- Cathedral of Saint Joseph (Burlington, Vermont)
- Cathedral of Saint Joseph (Wheeling, West Virginia)
- Cathedral of Saint Joseph the Workman, La Crosse, Wisconsin

== Oceania ==
=== American Samoa ===
- Co-Cathedral of St. Joseph the Worker (Fagatogo, American Samoa)

=== Australia ===
- Saints Mary and Joseph Catholic Cathedral, Armidale, New South Wales
- St Joseph's Cathedral, Rockhampton, Queensland

=== Cook Islands ===
- St. Joseph's Cathedral, Avarua, Rarotonga

=== New Zealand ===
- St. Joseph's Cathedral, Dunedin

== South America ==
=== Argentina ===
- St. Joseph's Cathedral, Gualeguaychú

=== Brazil ===
- St. Joseph's Cathedral, Fortaleza

=== Colombia ===
- Co-Cathedral of St. Joseph (Tadó)

=== Uruguay ===
- Cathedral of San José de Mayo

== See also ==
- List of churches named after Saint Joseph
