= Charles F. Buddy =

American prelate (1887–1966)

His Excellency, The Most Reverend Charles Francis Buddy
- Bishop of San Diego
- See: Diocese of San Diego
- Installed: October 31, 1936
- Term ended: March 6, 1966
- Successor: Francis James Furey

Orders
- Ordination: September 19, 1914 by Alessio Ascalesi
- Consecration: December 21, 1936 by Charles Hubert Le Blond

Personal details
- Born: October 4, 1887 Saint Joseph, Missouri, US
- Died: March 6, 1966 (aged 78) Banning, California, US
- Buried: Holy Cross Cemetery, San Diego, US
- Denomination: Roman Catholic Church
- Education: Benedictine College; St. Mary's College; Pontifical North American College
- Motto: In consilio sanctorum (In the council of the saints)

Styles of Charles F. Buddy
- Reference style: The Most Reverend
- Spoken style: Your Excellency
- Religious style: Monsignor
- Posthumous style: none

Charles Francis Buddy (October 4, 1887 – March 6, 1966) was an American prelate of the Roman Catholic Church. He served as the first bishop of the new Diocese of San Diego in California from 1936 until his death in 1966.

Buddy built what is today the University of San Diego, including a women's college, a men's college, a law school, a theological seminary, a basilica for the chapel, and offices for the diocese.

== Biography ==
=== Early life ===
Charles Buddy was born on October 4, 1887, in St. Joseph, Missouri, one of seven children of Charles Allen and Annie (née Farrell) Buddy. His father was a wholesale fruit merchant. He received his early education at the "Little Convent", a parochial school for boys in his native city. At age 10, he enrolled at the Christian Brothers College, also in St. Joseph. He entered St. Benedict's College in Atchison, Kansas, in 1902, and transferred to St. Mary's College in St. Marys, Kansas, two years later.

Following his graduation from St. Mary's in 1909, Buddy began his studies for the priesthood at the Pontifical North American College in Rome. He earned a doctorate in philosophy in 1911 and a licentiate in theology in 1913.

=== Priesthood ===
Buddy was ordained a priest by Cardinal Alessio Ascalesi for the Diocese of Saint Joseph at the Basilica of St. John Lateran in Rome on September 19, 1914. After his return to Missouri in 1915, the diocese assigned Buddy as a curate at St. Joseph's Cathedral Parish in St. Joseph, Missouri. Bishop Maurice Burkein 1917 named Buddy as chancellor of the diocese and as his private secretary. However, Buddy was forced to resign both positions in 1919 after a severe case of influenza.

After regaining his health, Buddy served as diocesan director of the Society for the Propagation of the Faith from 1922 to 1936. He also served as rector of St. Joseph's Cathedral from 1926 to 1936. In 1930, Buddy founded St. Vincent's Cafeteria and Shelter for the homeless, which the government took over in 1934 as a transient relief bureau. He also established St. Augustine's Parish, the first Catholic parish for African-Americans in northern Missouri. Buddy sat on the City of St. Joseph board of health, assisted in Community Chest campaigns, and founded an information forum for people of all religions.

=== Bishop of San Diego ===
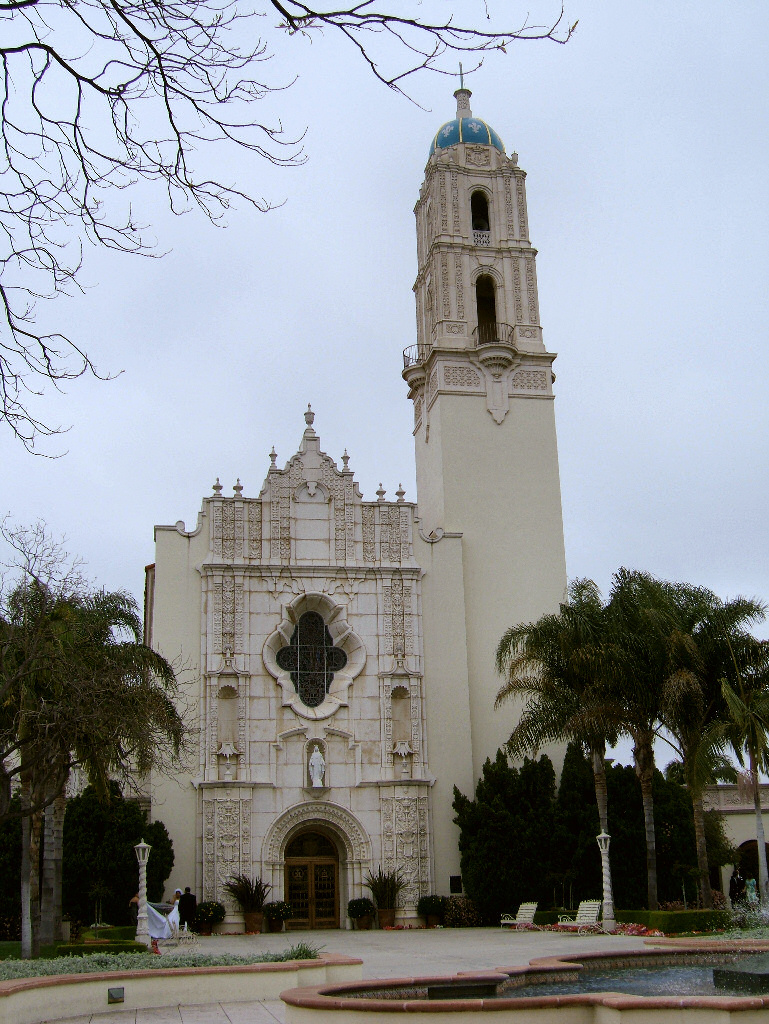
University of San Diego, San Diego, California (2005)

On October 31, 1936, Buddy was appointed the first bishop of the newly erected Diocese of San Diego by Pope Pius XI. He received his episcopal consecration on December 21, 1936, from Bishop Charles Le Blond, with Bishops Gerald Bergan and Francis Monaghan serving as co-consecrators. His installation took place at St. Joseph's Cathedral on February 3, 1937.

Buddy was close friends with Bishop William O'Brien, director of the Catholic Church Extension Society in Chicago, Illinois. The Extension helped finance the construction of churches in the diocese and provided financial support to its priests.

In 1939, Buddy declared that "the world is in a stupor from an overdose of materialism." A strong opponent of communism, which he claimed wants to "destroy both church and state", Buddy once said, "These 'isms' have tried the patience of our poor and underprivileged who are being tempted by false prophets and insincere leaders." He co-founded the University of San Diego in 1949, serving as its first president from 1950 to 1966. He attended the first session of the Second Vatican Council in Rome in 1962.

=== Death ===
Buddy died on March 6, 1966, at age 78 in Banning, California, on a confirmation trip to parishes in the San Gorgonio Pass.

Catholic Church titles
Preceded by None	Bishop of San Diego; 1936–1966	Succeeded by Francis James Furey
