= Ignatius Conrad =

Swiss Benedictine monk and missionary

The Right Reverend Ignatius Conrad OSB
- Abbot
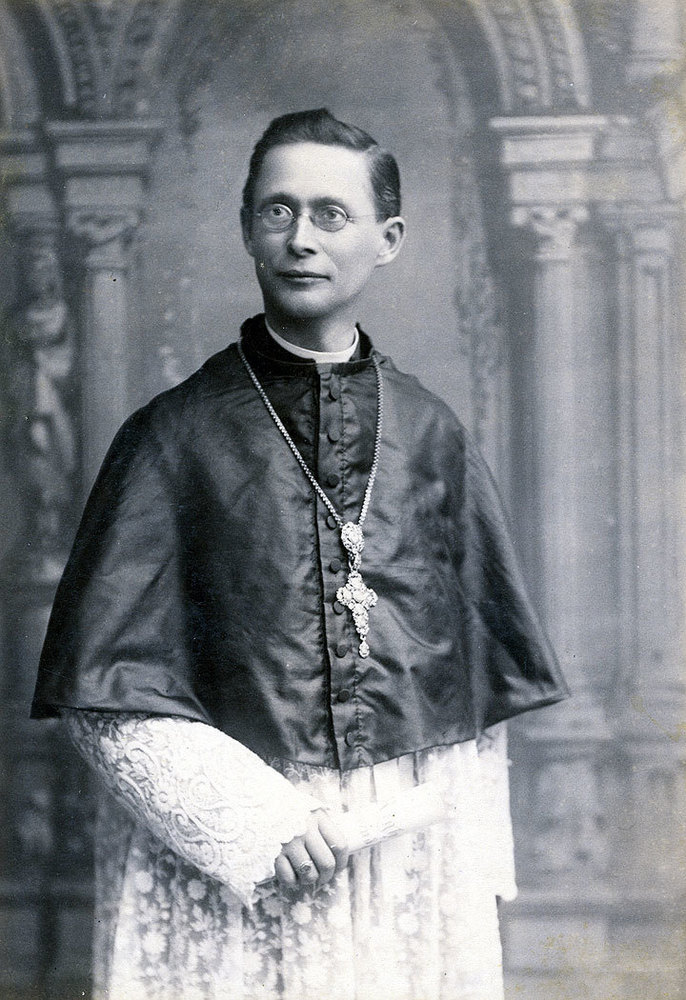
- Native name: Nicholas Conrad
- Elected: March 24, 1892

Orders
- Ordination: September 17, 1871 by Bishop Kaspar Willi
- Rank: Abbot

Personal details
- Born: November 13, 1846 Au, Switzerland
- Died: March 13, 1926 (aged 79) Baldegg, Switzerland
- Buried: Einsiedeln Abbey
- Denomination: Roman Catholic
- Parents: Johann Conrad and Gertrude Kűng
- Occupation: Abbot
- Profession: Benedictine monk

Ignatius Conrad OSB (November 13, 1846 Au, Switzerland – March 13, 1926 Baldegg, Switzerland) was a Benedictine monk, a Swiss missionary, and the first Abbot of Subiaco Abbey in Arkansas, which was named as an abbey in 1891. He served from 1892 to 1925. Fr Ignatius Conrad initially worked with the German Catholic communities in the south-western region of the United States.

He took a missionary approach with the monastery, conducting outreach to other communities and founding numerous churches. He collaborated with religious sisters to found church and educational institutions across Arkansas, Missouri, and Texas.

== Early life ==
Nicholas Conrad was born in the Canton of Aargau, Switzerland, on November 13, 1846, the son of Johann Conrad and Gertrude Kűng. After completing his primary education in canton schools, he continued his studies at Engelberg Abbey. He had five brothers who also entered religious life, including older brother Fr. Frowin Conrad, Fr. Pius, and Fr. John.

Later Nicholas Conrad studied philosophy at Einsiedeln Abbey and entered that Benedictine monastery in 1867.

== Monk and priest ==
Conrad made his profession of vows with the Benedictines of Einsiedeln Abbey on August 30, 1868, receiving the name Ignatius Loyola. He was ordained to the priesthood three years later, on September 17, 1871, by Bishop Kaspar Willi of the Swiss Diocese of Chur. He was appointed to teach Latin in the Abbey school, serving from 1872 to 1875.

== United States ==
At the end of the 1875 school year, he was assigned to Einsiedeln’s monastic foundation in the United States, St. Meinrad Abbey in southern Indiana. (It received Archabbey designation in 1954.)

Conrad was instructed to assist his three brothers, who were also Benedictine monks and priests, in founding what became Engelberg Abbey in northwest Missouri. As noted, Fr. Ignatius was one of five Conrad brothers who became priests, four of whom also joined the Benedictine Order. The eldest, Fr. Frowin Conrad had been sent to the United States in 1872 for this purpose and had already established a priory in Missouri with his brothers, Fathers Pius and John.

After gaining some proficiency in writing and speaking English, Fr Ignatius began his missionary work in Nodaway, Worth, Gentry, and other northwestern counties of Missouri. On May 18, 1878, he was appointed Rector of the Cathedral Church in St. Joseph, Missouri, assisting Bishop John Joseph Hogan. He would later be appointed as Administrator of the Diocese. The secular clergy (priests) in the diocese were reportedly not pleased that a religious priest (monk) had been appointed to this position.

Fr Ignatius continued in this work until March 24, 1892, when he was elected as the first Abbot of Subiaco Abbey in Logan County, Arkansas. This was in western Arkansas, south of the Arkansas River. The institute had been named as an abbey the previous year, by Pope Leo XIII, who named it after Subiaco, Italy, the location of St. Benedict's first monastery in the early 6th century.

The newly elected Abbot was blessed on May 24, 1892, in the Cathedral Church in St. Joseph, Missouri. Bishop John Joseph Hogan undertook the solemn blessing; he was joined by the abbots of St. Meinrad and Conception abbeys.

As the first Abbot of Subiaco Abbey, Conrad conducted preaching at retreats and missions for Catholics in the regioni, as well as fundraising in order to build a monastery and church at Subiaco. He traveled for months at a time in the United States and in his native Switzerland to raise the funds. By 1913, the new monastic buildings were in the final stages of construction.

In 1908 Abbot Ignatius donated 80 acres of abbey land to establish a townsite in order to secure a railroad depot in this area, which was desired both by the abbey and many of the area residents. The town was platted and called Subiaco, Arkansas, after the Abbey. He also completed the agreement to bring a railroad connection near the monastery. The final event for the Subiaco segment of the line was the official inauguration of train service on June 30, 1909, after Abbot Ignatius drove the last spike of the railroad at Subiaco (see photo). This line was originally known as the Paris–Subiaco Traction Company in 1908. It closed in 1962 because of lessened traffic and railroad restructuring nationwide.

Nativist sentiment among Protestant European Americans in the United States rose in response to increased waves of immigration from southern and eastern Europe. Many of the new immigrants were Catholic and Jewish, and native born Americans feared changes they brought. In addition, the outbreak of the Great War in Europe aroused suspicions of immigrants in the United States who had ties to Germany and the Central Powers, which became enemies of the US after it entered the war. Anti-German and anti-Catholic discrimination rose in many areas, and persisted even in the postwar years.

The Arkansas legislature, dominated by Protestants, passed the Convent Inspection Act (Posey Act) in 1915, which authorized state investigations of Catholic monasteries and convents. Abbot Ignatius assigned Fr. Boniface Spanke to undertake a speaking tour to combat anti-Catholicism, and Prior Fr. Stocker to begin an education campaign through the press. The Abbot personally wrote to each legislator, inviting them to visit the abbey. During this period, state investigators twice searched Subiaco Abbey. The act was repealed in 1937.

== Final years ==
In May 1925, Abbot Ignatius went to Rome for the election of a new Abbot Primate of the Benedictine Confederation. He applied to Pope Pius XI for permission to resign his office because of ill health. Instead, the Subiaco community was authorized to choose a coadjutor Abbot.

On December 1, 1925, Father Edward Burgert was elected to this office. Abbot Ignatius’ health failed during this time. He returned to Switzerland, where he was hospitalized in Baldegg. He died there on March 13, 1926. He is buried at Einsiedeln Abbey in Switzerland.

== Notability ==
In his service as Abbot for more than 30 years, Abbot Ignatius expanded the missionary outreach of the Catholic Church with his foundations of new parishes in Arkansas, Missouri, and Texas. Under his leadership, the monastic community would grow to sixty-six solemnly professed monks and three novices at the time of his death. In addition, he helped found new Benedictine communities in the American Southwest and West.

He also:

- Incorporated a missionary approach to monastic life, in contrast to other monasteries in the Swiss-American Congregation that chose instead to prioritize internal claustral life and liturgy. In American monastic history of the late 19th century and early 20th centuries, this contrast was known as the fight against the German "Beuronese" influences in monasteries founded from Switzerland. Abbot Ignatius chose the "missionary" approach in contrast to other abbots, such as his brother Abbot Frowin Conrad, who favored the Beuronese approach. As a result, Abbot Ignatius partnered with the religious sisters of Saint Scholastica Convent to found parishes, schools, and colleges across Arkansas, Missouri, and Texas.

== Legacy and honors ==
- In recognition of his work in Arkansas, Abbot Ignatius was listed in the Centennial History of Arkansas.
- To honor Abbot Ignatius's work for the Catholic Church in America, Pope Pius XI bestowed on him the purple zucchetto, a rare honor for a religious priest.
- Abbot Ignatius was listed in the Dictionary of Benedictine Biography (Biographia Benedictina).

== Gallery ==
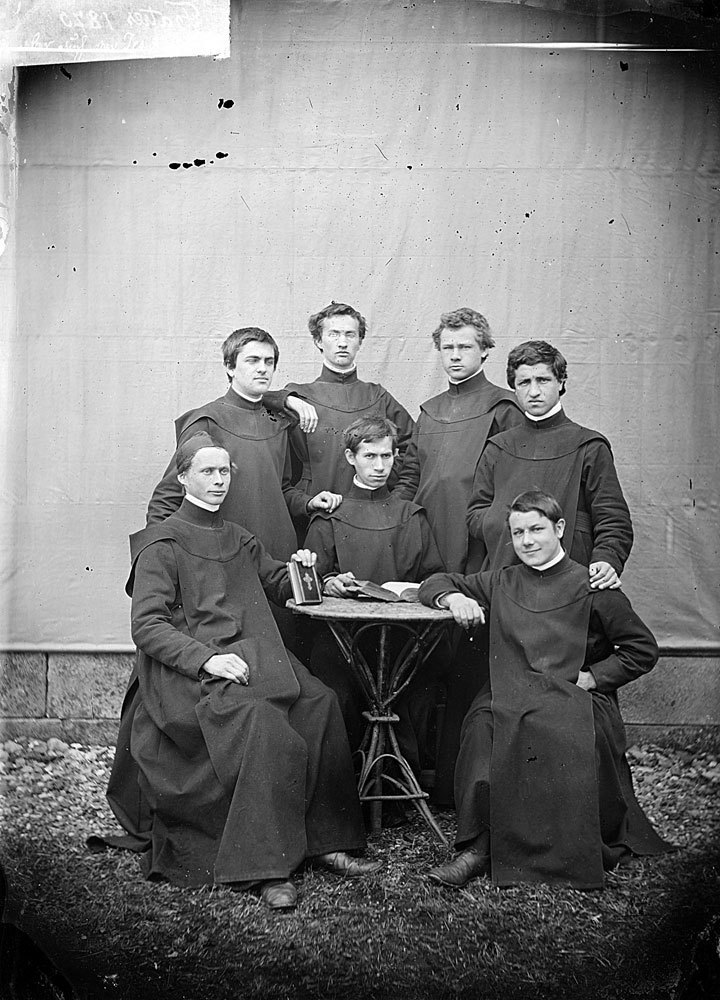

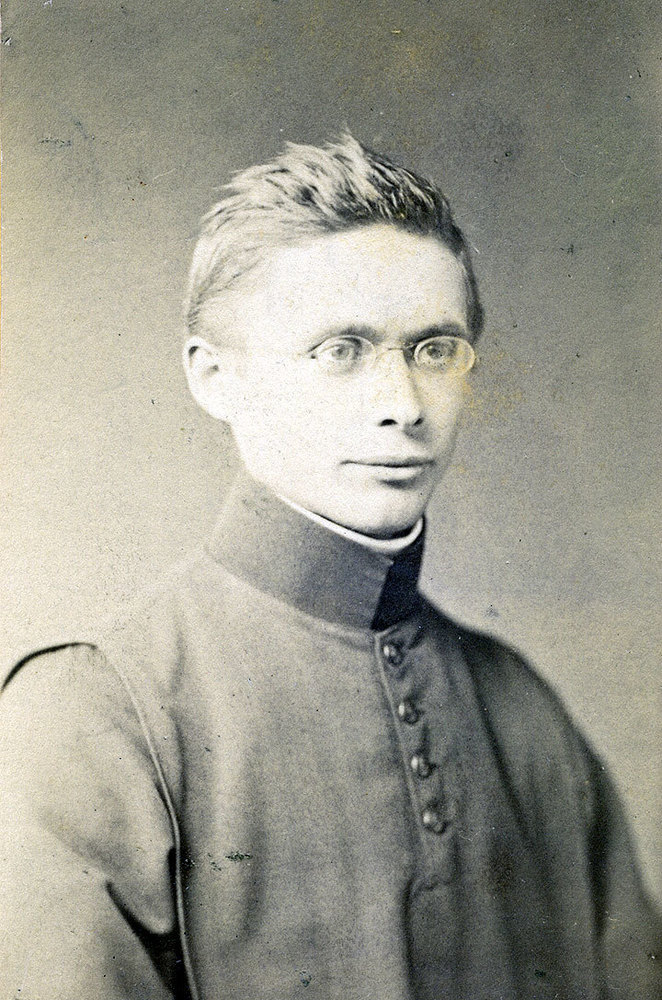

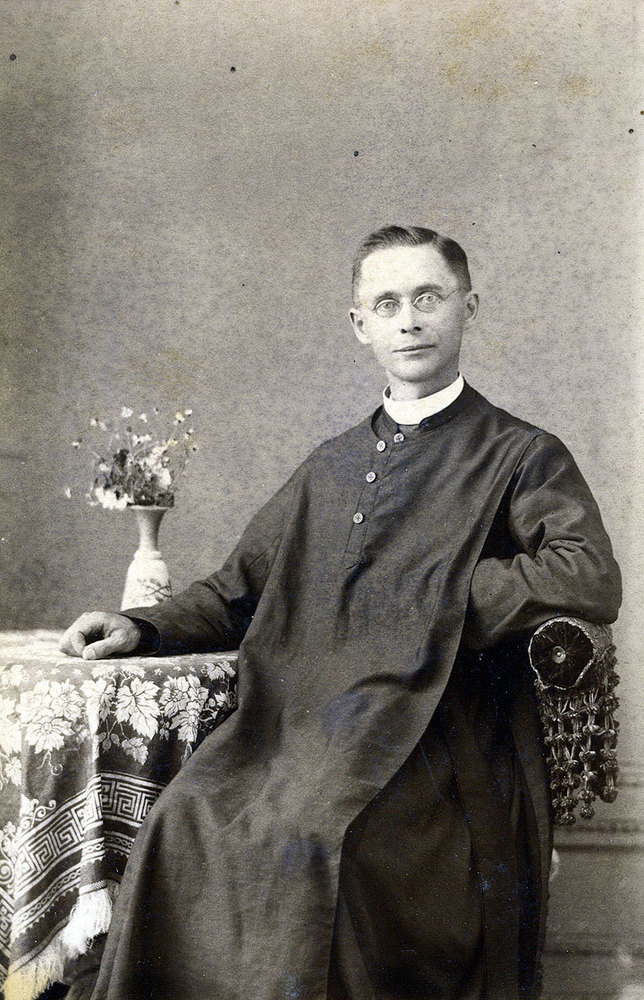

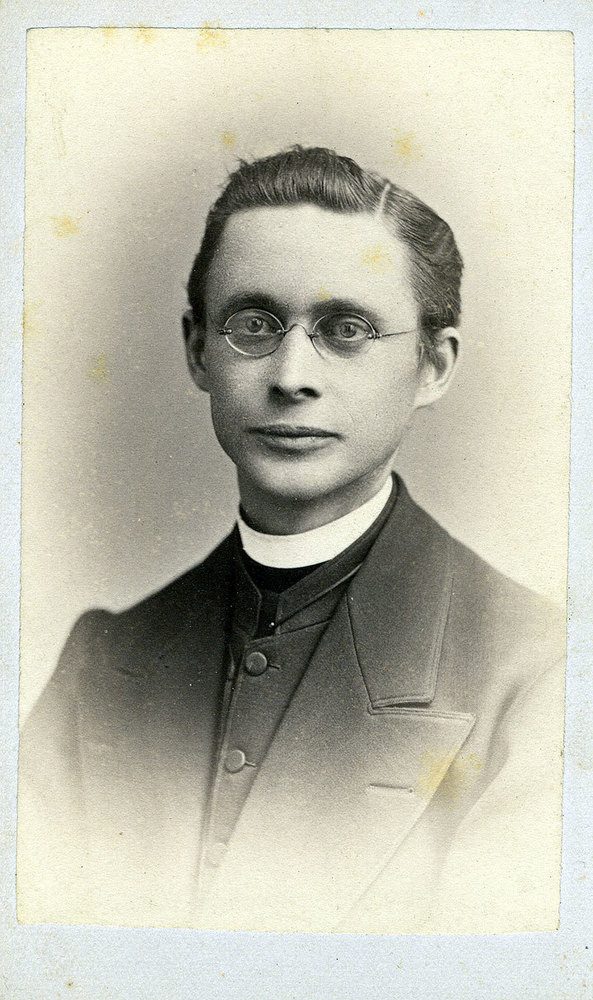

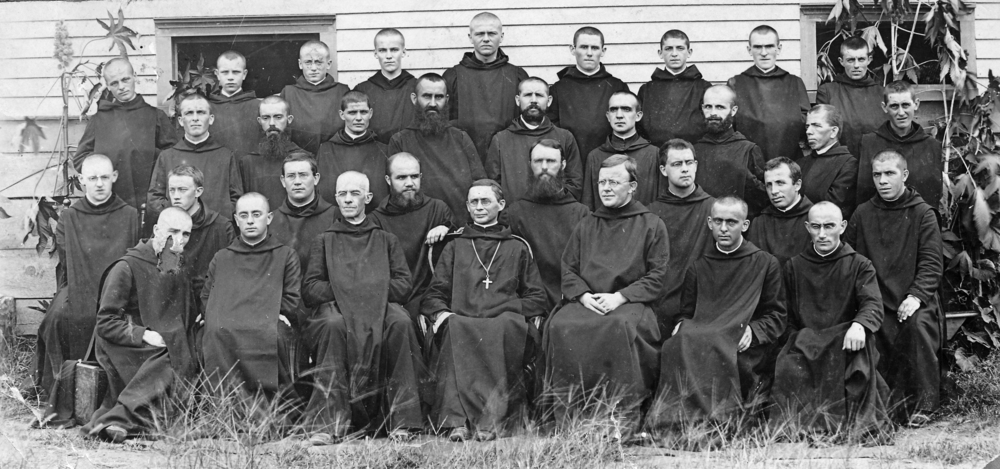

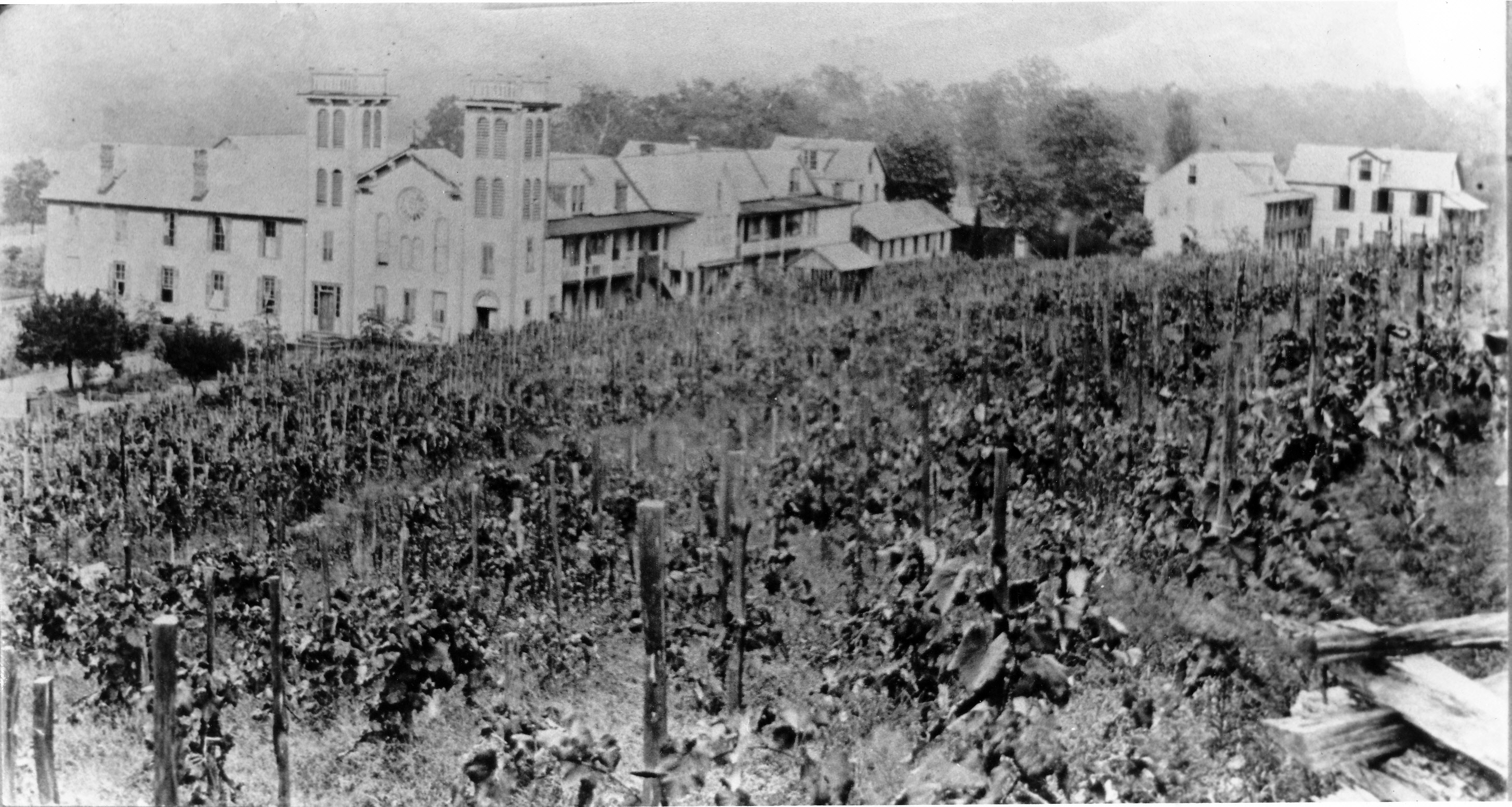

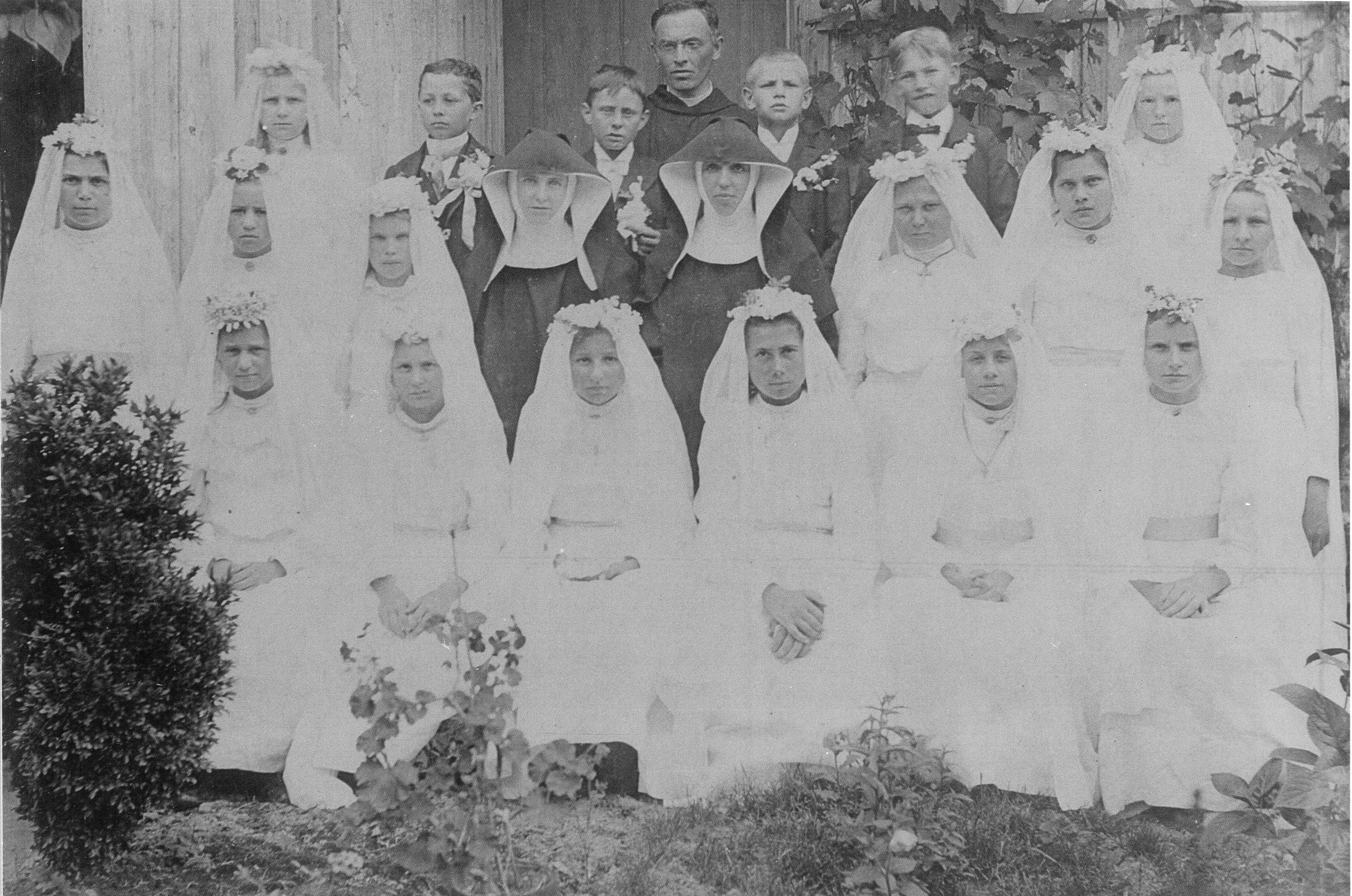

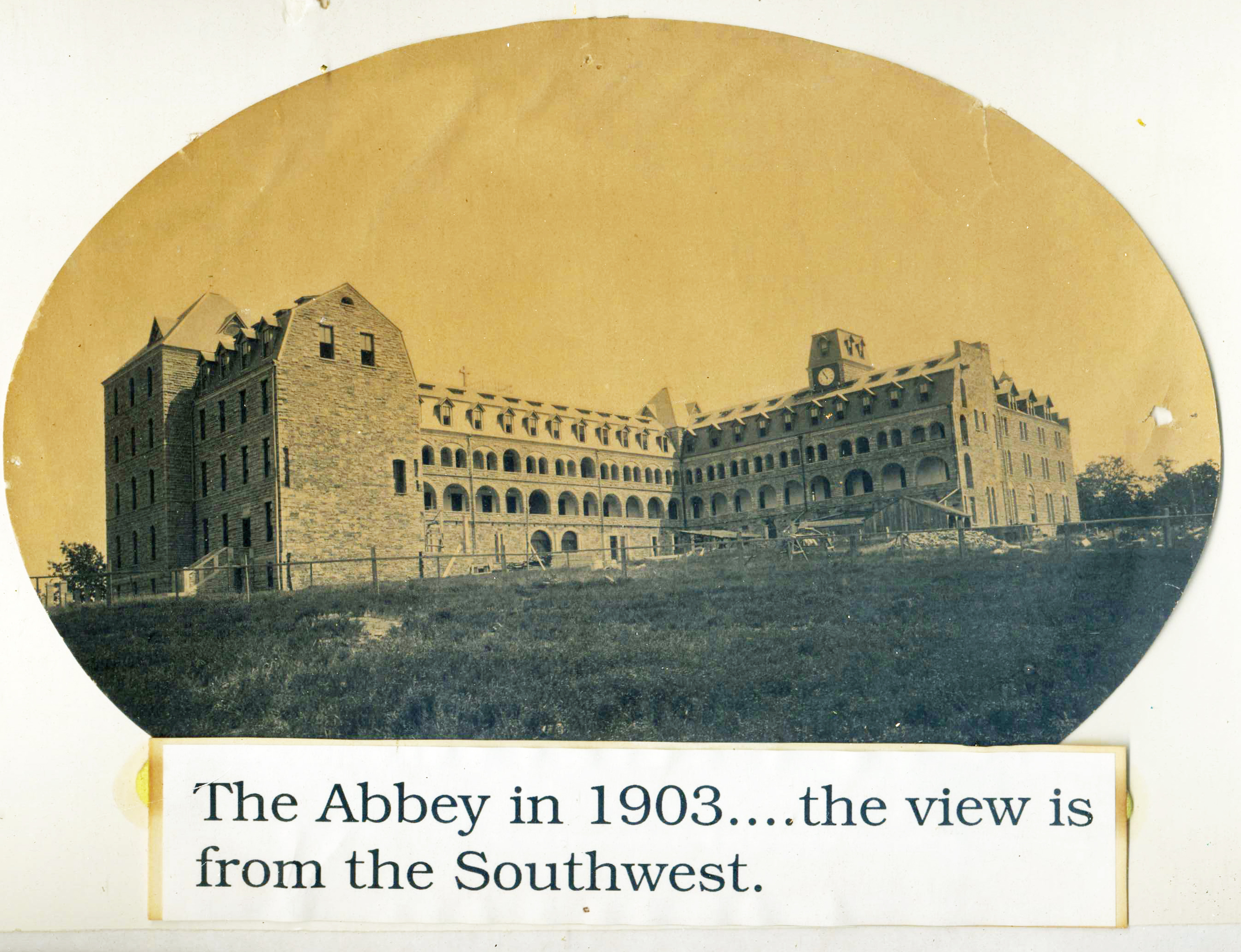

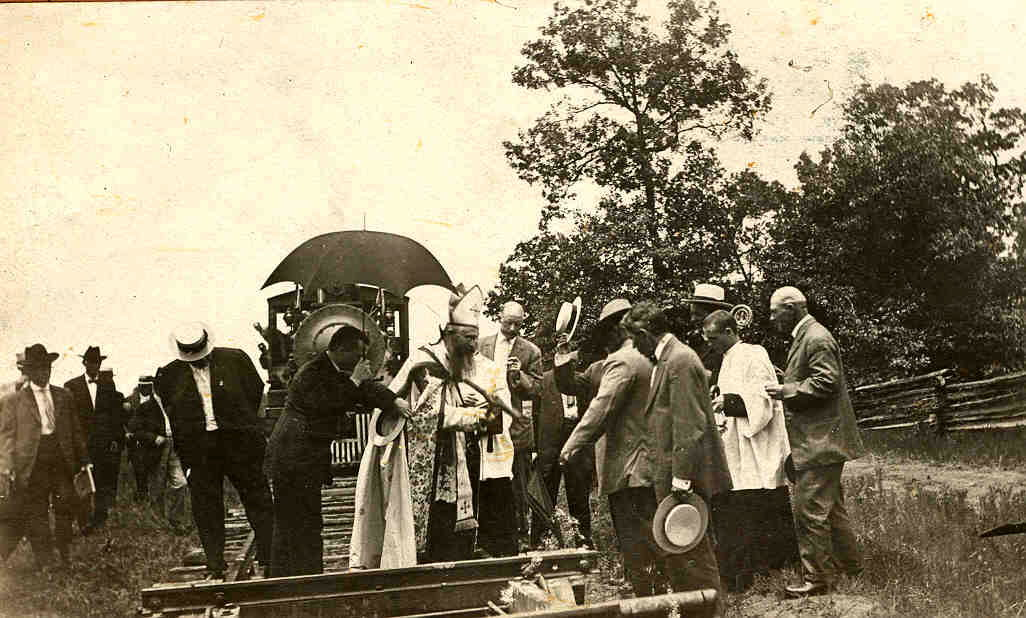

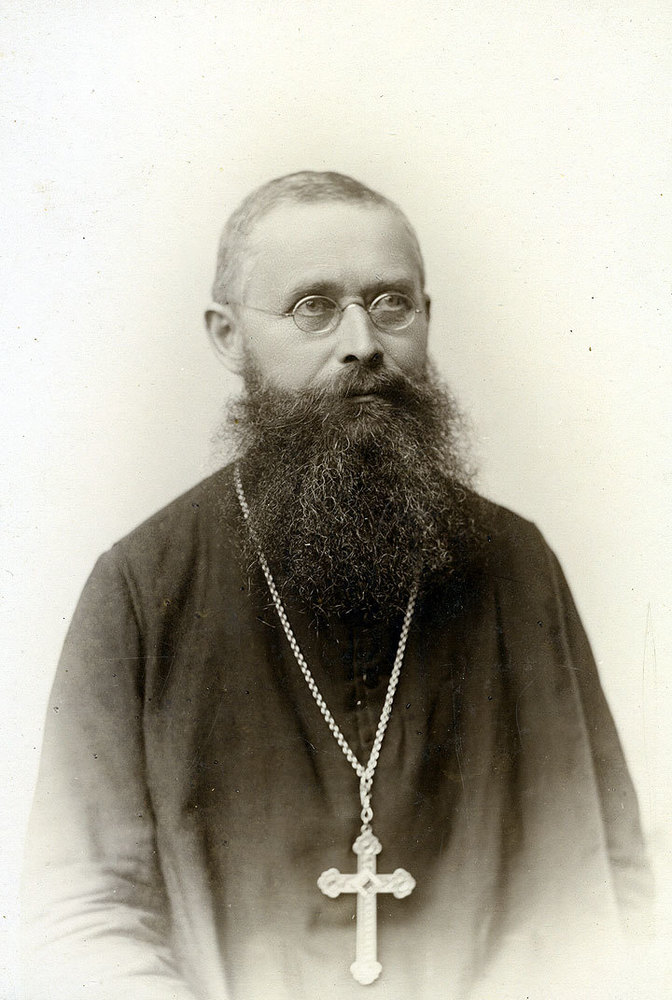

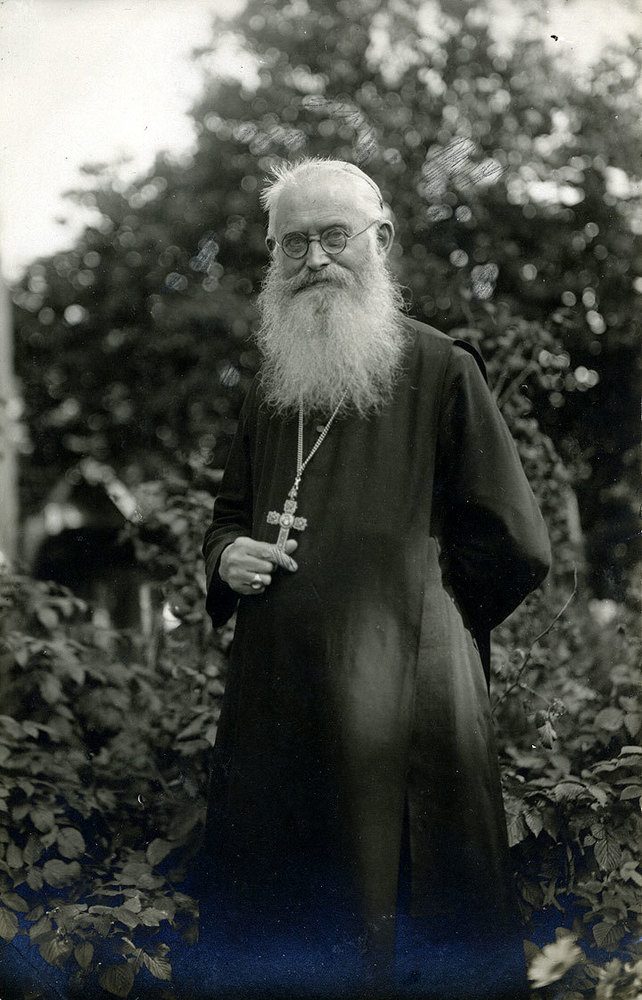

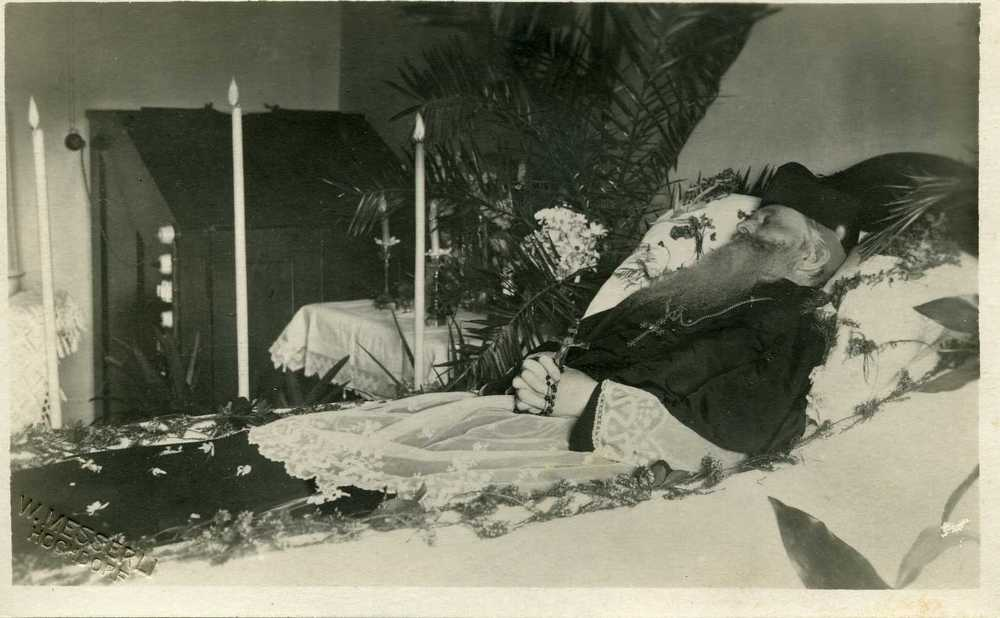

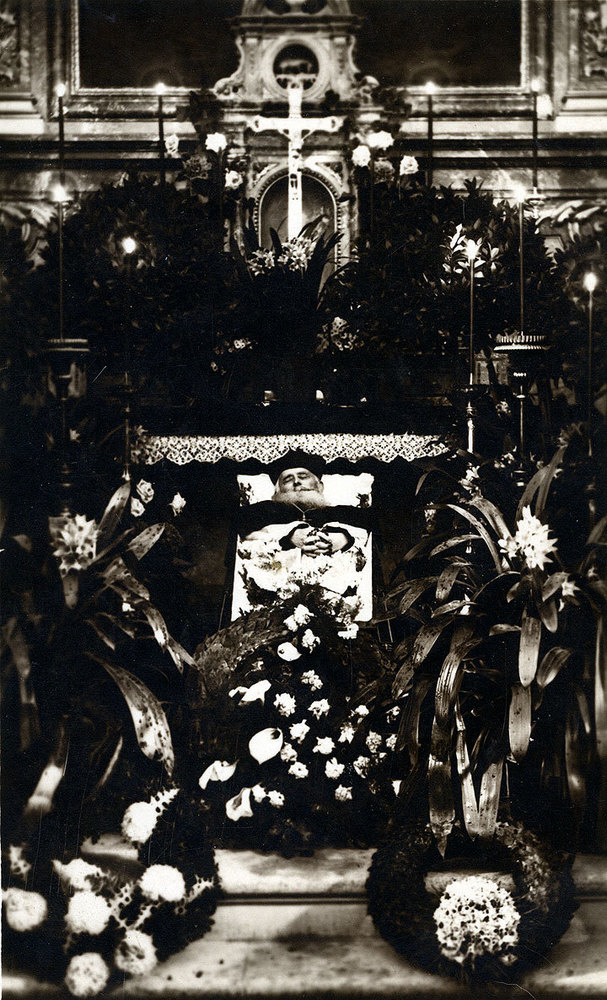

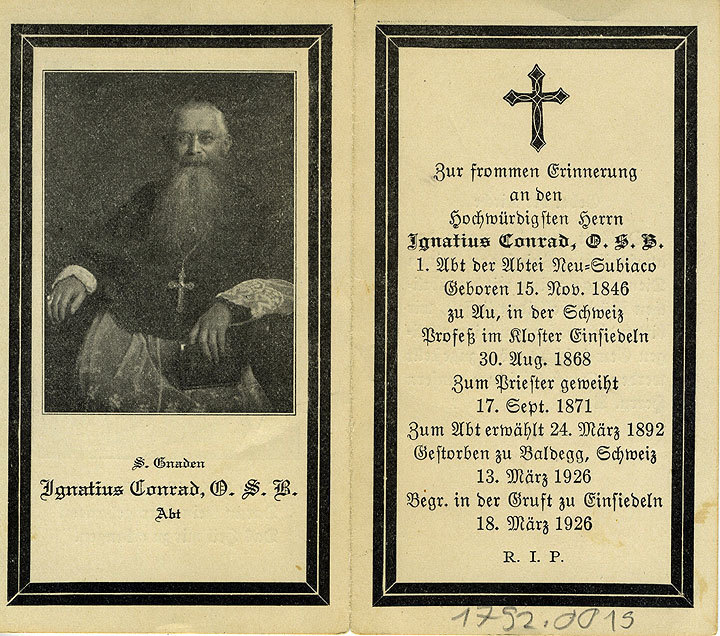
