= Roman Catholic Diocese of Saint Joseph =

Former Latin Catholic ecclesiastical jurisdiction in Missouri, USA

Coordinates: 39°45′29″N 94°50′12″W

Diocese of Saint Joseph Dioecesis Sancti Iosephi

Catholic
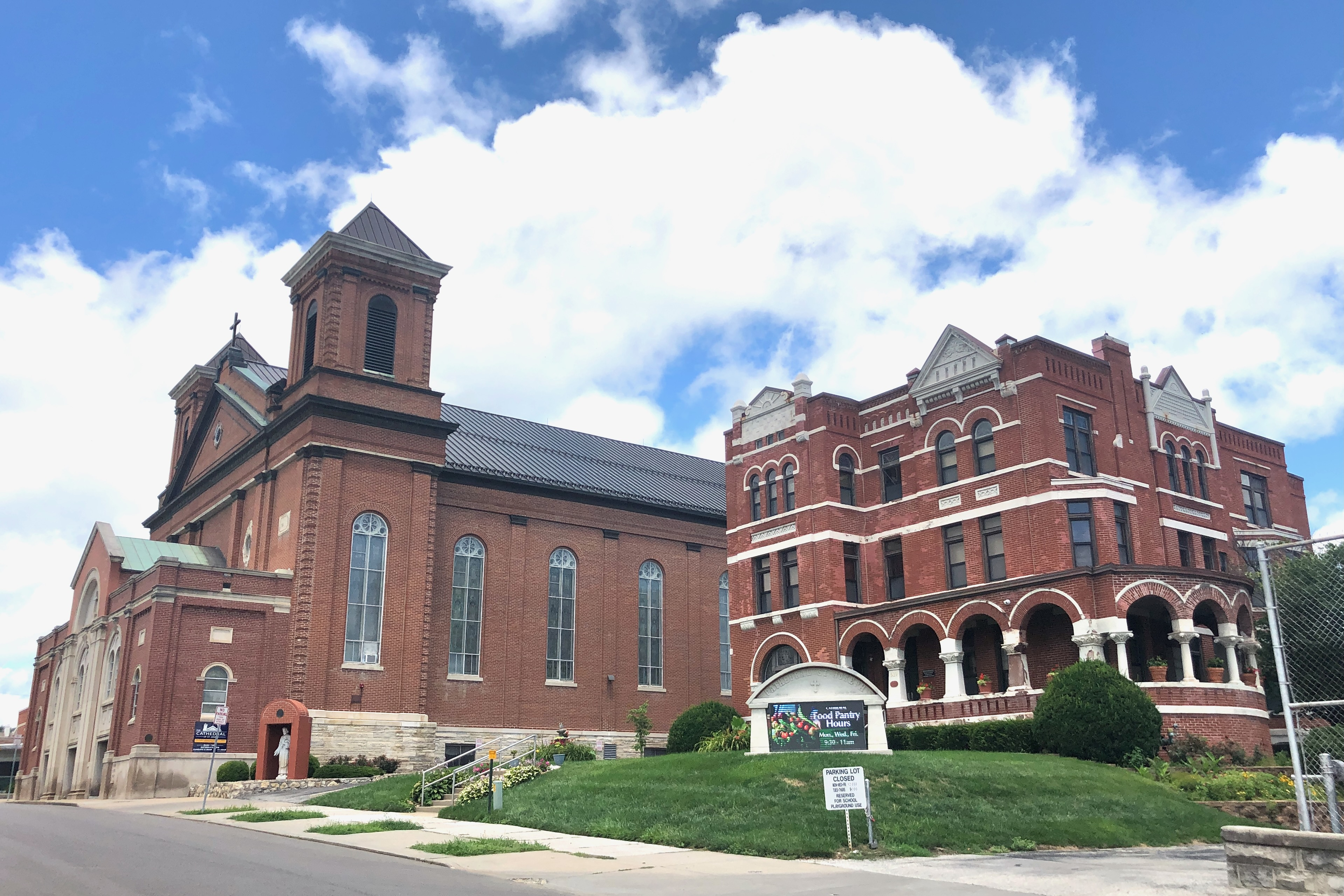
- The Cathedral of St. Joseph and rectory. The rectory served as the diocesan chancery.

Location
- Country: United States
- Ecclesiastical province: St. Louis

Statistics
- Area: 18,206 sq mi (47,150 km^{2})
- Population: Total; Catholics: (as of 1950); 633,987; 32,063 (5.1%)
- Parishes: 65

Information
- Denomination: Roman Catholic
- Sui iuris church: Latin Church
- Rite: Roman Rite
- Established: March 3, 1868
- Dissolved: July 2, 1956
- Cathedral: Cathedral of St. Joseph

Map
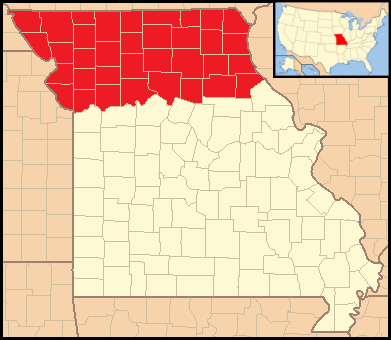
- Map of the diocese in its final form.

The Diocese of Saint Joseph (Latin: Dioecesis Sancti Iosephi) was a Latin Church ecclesiastical territory or diocese of the Roman Catholic Church in the northwestern part of the state of Missouri in the United States, erected on March 3, 1868, with territories taken from the Archdiocese of Saint Louis. Its first bishop was John Joseph Hogan. On July 2, 1956, the diocese lost territory to the newly erected Diocese of Jefferson City and the Diocese of Springfield–Cape Girardeau. On that date it was united to the Diocese of Kansas City, which was renamed the Diocese of Kansas City–Saint Joseph.

== History ==
=== 1840–1870 ===
After the founding of Saint Joseph, MO by Joseph Rubidoux in 1843, the first Catholic church in the town was built in 1847. Its first pastor was Rev. Thomas Scanlon. In September of 1847, this church was dedicated by the Archbishop of St. Louis, Archbishop P.R. Kenrick. During the Second Plenary Council of Baltimore in 1866, St. Joseph was proposed to become its own diocese. This diocese would encompass the portion of Northern Missouri that lies between the Missouri and Chariton rivers. Its first Bishop was chosen on March 3, 1869 as Bishop John Joseph Hogan. The same year, ground broke for a cathedral.

=== 1870–1900 ===
On September 10, 1880, Bishop Hogan was transferred to the Diocese of Kansas City, but he remained the administrator of the St. Joseph diocese. Bishop Maurice Francis Burke was moved from the Diocese of Cheyenne, Wyoming to take his place in 1893.

=== After 1900 ===
As of 1911, the diocese had accumulated 8 parishes, 12 priests, 6 parish schools, a college created by the Christian Brothers, and a school for young women created by the Sisters of Charity. The diocese had a catholic population of around 10,000 people.

=== Unification with Diocese of Kansas City ===
Shortly after Bishop LeBlond resigned from his position, the diocese was united with the Diocese of Kansas City to form the Diocese of Kansas City-Saint Joseph on July 2, 1956.

== Bishops ==
=== Bishops of Saint Joseph ===
- John Joseph Hogan (1868–1880); appointed Bishop of Kansas City but continued here as Apostolic Administrator, 1880–1893
- Maurice Francis Burke (1893–1923); died
- Francis Gilfillan (1923–1933); died
- Charles Hubert Le Blond (1933–1956); resigned

=== Coadjutor bishop ===
- Francis Gilfillan (1922–1923)

=== Other priests of this diocese who became bishops ===
- Francis Johannes, appointed Coadjutor Bishop of Leavenworth in 1927
- Charles Francis Buddy, appointed Bishop of San Diego in 1936

== Resources ==
- Diocese of Kansas City–Saint Joseph
- Catholic Hierarchy Profile of the Diocese of Saint Joseph
- Article in the Catholic Encyclopedia
