= Francis Gilfillan =

Irish-born prelate

His Excellency, The Most Reverend Francis Gilfillan
- Bishop of St. Joseph
- See: Diocese of St. Joseph
- In office: March 17, 1923; January 13, 1933
- Predecessor: Maurice Francis Burke
- Successor: Charles Hubert Le Blond

Orders
- Ordination: June 24, 1895 by John Joseph Kain
- Consecration: November 8, 1922 by John J. Glennon

Personal details
- Born: February 16, 1872 Aughavas, County Leitrim, Ireland
- Died: January 13, 1933 (aged 60) St. Joseph, Missouri, US
- Denomination: Roman Catholic
- Education: theology at St. Patrick's College; Catholic University of America
- Motto: In consilio sanctorum (In the counsel of the saints)

Francis Gilfillan DD (February 16, 1872 – January 13, 1933) was an Irish-born prelate of the Roman Catholic Church. He served as coadjutor bishop and bishop of the Diocese of St. Joseph in Missouri from 1922 until his death in 1933.

== Biography ==
=== Early life ===
Francis Gilfillan was born on February 16, 1872, in Aughavas, County Leitrim in Ireland. He received his classical education at St. Mary's Seminary in Moyne, County Longford, from 1886 to 1889. From 1889 to 1894, he studied philosophy and theology at St. Patrick's College in Carlow, Ireland. Gilfillan immigrated to the United States to enter the Catholic University of America in Washington, D.C., where he received a Doctor of Divinity degree.

=== Priesthood ===
Gilfillan was ordained to the priesthood for the Archdiocese of St. Louis by Archbishop John J. Kain in St. Louis, Missouri, on June 24, 1895. After his ordination, the archdiocese assigned Gilfillan as a curate at the Cathedral of St. Louis Parish. In 1907, he was appointed pastor of the parish. He also served as a board member of Kenrick Seminary in St. Louis and of the Theological Conferences' Committee of the Board of Synodal Examiners.

=== Coadjutor Bishop and Bishop of St. Joseph ===
On July 8, 1922, Gilfillan was appointed coadjutor bishop of St. Joseph and titular bishop of Pegae by Pope Pius XI. He received his episcopal consecration on November 8, 1922, from Archbishop John J. Glennon, with Bishops Christopher E. Byrne and Thomas F. Lillis serving as co-consecrators. at the Cathedral of Saint Louis. After the death of Bishop Maurice F. Burke on March 17, 1923, Gilfillan automatically succeeded him as the third bishop of St. Joseph.

As bishop, Gilfillan chose to live in a residence for priests rather than reside in the episcopal residence. He opened an orphanage in St. Joseph, Missouri, and built the Christian Brothers High School in that city.

=== Death and legacy ===
Francis Gilfillan died at his residence in St. Joseph on January 13, 1933, at age 60.

== See also ==
Catholic Church titles
Preceded by Maurice Francis Burke	Bishop of St. Joseph; 1923–1933	Succeeded by Charles Hubert Le Blond
