= Cathedral of St. Joseph (St. Joseph, Missouri) =

Historic church in Missouri, United States

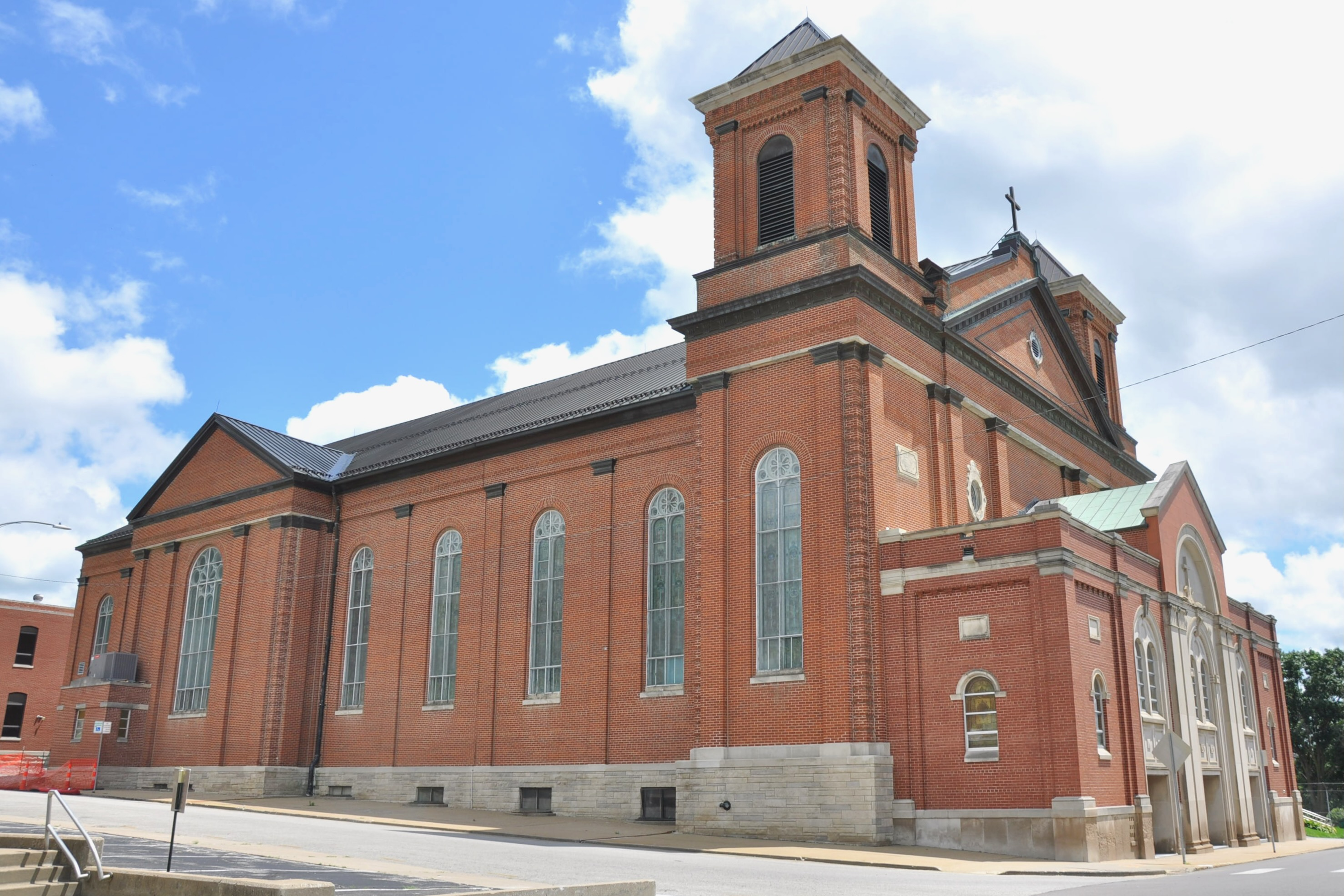
- Cathedral of St. Joseph in 2024
- Cathedral of St. Joseph
- Location: 519 N. 10th St. St. Joseph, Missouri
- Country: United States
- Denomination: Roman Catholic Church
- Website: cathedralsj.org

History
- Status: Co-cathedral/Parish
- Founded: 1845 (parish)
- Dedication: Saint Joseph

Architecture
- Functional status: Active
- Architect: Patrick F. Meagher
- Style: Romanesque Revival
- Groundbreaking: 1869
- Completed: 1871

Specifications
- Materials: Brick

Administration
- Archdiocese: Kansas City–St. Joseph

Clergy
- Archbishop: Most Rev. James Johnston
- Rector: Rev. Stephen Hansen
- St. Joseph Cathedral, Cathedral Rectory, Convent of the Sisters of the Sacred Heart
- U.S. Historic district – Contributing property
- Location within Missouri Location within the United States
- Coordinates: 39°46′15″N 94°50′54″W
- Built: 1883 (rectory); 1908 (convent)
- Architectural style: Italianate (rectory); Colonial Revival (convent)
- Part of: Cathedral Hill Historic District (ID00000691)
- Added to NRHP: June 15, 2000

The Cathedral of St. Joseph is a Catholic cathedral in St. Joseph, Missouri, in the United States. Along with the Cathedral of the Immaculate Conception in Kansas City, Missouri it is the seat of the Diocese of Kansas City-St. Joseph.

== History ==
=== St. Joseph's Church ===
The early predecessor to the two Cathedrals of Saint Joseph was a small chapel at a trading post on the Missouri River. The Canadian fur trader Joseph Robidoux has constructed the trading post in 1826, which then evolved into a small settlement.

The missionary priest Pierre-Jean De Smet, a Jesuit from the Diocese of St. Louis, visited Robidoux in 1838 and convinced him to build the chapel for the few Catholics in the area. Later that year, a second priest celebrated the first mass in the area in Robidoux's log house. Jesuit missionaries visiting Native American converts in Iowa periodically stopped at the chapel for the next seven years. Robidoux established the town of St. Joseph in 1843.

Reverend Thomas Scanlan arrived in St. Joseph of October 15, 1845, and began planning a church. He built a 40 by 20 feet (12.2 m × 6.1 m) brick church at Fifth and Felix Streets. Archbishop Peter Richard Kenrick of St. Louis dedicated St. Joseph's Church on June 17, 1847. At the time of the dedication, the new parish had 20 families. Scanlan died in 1860 and was replaced by Reverend John Hennessy who served the parish until 1866.

=== First Cathedral of Saint Joseph ===
On March 3, 1868 Pope Pius IX established the Diocese of St. Joseph. St. Joseph's Church became the first Cathedral of Saint Joseph. However, the diocese immediately began planning for a new, larger cathedral.Bishop John J. Hogan bought a property at the corner of Tenth and Isadore Streets to build the second cathedral. The cornerstone for the second Cathedral of Saint Joseph was laid on September 12, 1869.

The construction of the cathedral was slow due to continuing budget shortfalls. This may have been partly due to the Panic of 1873. Several prominent parishioners connected with the St. Joseph Improvement Company sponsored a raffle of real estate in the cathedral neighborhood to raise funds. The raffle involved 60 lots valued between $200 and $500, with tickets offered at $3 each. Ticket sales were slower than expected and the drawing was delayed from November 22, 1870, to April 10, 1871.

=== Second Cathedral of St. Joseph ===
The first mass in the second Cathedral of Saint Joseph was celebrated on March 17, 1871. However, the interior walls were not yet plastered and the stained glass windows not yet installed. During this time period, the diocese demolished the old cathedral and sold the property to fund the construction. Reverend Ignatius Conrad was named rector of Saint in 1876. Construction was finished on the cathedral in 1883.

Reverend Andrew Newman was named rector of Saint Joseph in 1892. The next year, the diocese constructed a rectory on the cathedral campus. The parish priests had previously resided in an apartment in the church. The priests also used rectory as the diocesan chancery. Bishop Maurice F. Burke oversaw the first renovation of the cathedral in 1900. At that time, the diocese constructed the two towers and a portico entrance that were in the original cathedral project plan. In 1911, Burke purchased a nearby property to serve as the bishop's residence.

In 1924, Reverend Leo Ruggle was appointed as associate pastor of the cathedral parish. He was named in 1937 to 1961. In 1929, the McKenny Memorial Organ was installed in 1929 by the Kilgen Organ Company of St. Louis, Missouri.In 1933, the parish installed painted copper plates depicting the stations of the cross. They were fabricated by the Daprato studio in Paris, France.

The narthex, featuring three entrance doors, was added in 1956. On August 29, 1956, Pope Pius XII merged the Diocese of St. Joseph with the Diocese of Kansas City to form the Diocese of Kansas City-St. Joseph.The new diocese now had two co-cathedrals: the Cathedral of the Immaculate Conception in Kansas City, Missouri, and the Cathedral of St. Joseph. In 1959, the diocese constructed another entrance to the cathedral on its west side. The diocese also rebuilt the two towers that same year.

The Cathedral of St. Joseph was renovated from 1969 to 1970 following the liturgical reforms of the Second Vatican Council of the early 1960s. The diocese also added seating in the transept and moved the sanctuary forward. A chapel was also constructed for weekday prayer. The cathedral received a donation of a Baldwin grand piano in 1968.

The diocese in 1995 redecorated the cathedral interior and added stained glass windows to the upper vestibule. The parish opened a food pantry in the 1980s. A new cathedra was installed in the cathedral in 2014.

The diocese in 2021 began a $15 million renovation of the Cathedral of Saint Joseph. The project included the replacement of stained glass windows, the installation of a new pipe organ and bronze doors, and the resolution of problems with the mechanical systems. The diocese also included the commissioning of new artwork in the cathedral. The cathedral was rededicated in May 2023.

The cathedra, rectory and Early Childhood Center are all contributing properties to the Cathedral Hill Historic District on the National Register of Historic Places.

== Cathedral exterior ==
The cathedral is a brick masonry building designed in the Romanesque Revival style by Patrick F. Meagher.The building features a transept and two corner towers on the main façade with pyramidal roofs. The church's main building was originally roofed with Ludowici Spanish tile, which were later replaced. "The facade features three-story, projecting box bay and side, two-story, projecting polygonal bays." The L-shaped porch is supported by Romanesque-style columns. The auditorium features Art Deco elements on its design from the 1950s.

The former convent building is influenced by the Colonial Revival style. It features a hipped roof and an entrance portico with Doric columns and capitals. The rectory is a three–story brick structure.

== Cathedral interior ==
The Marian Shrine in the cathedral features a mural of a Missouri landscape, with a white dove hovering over a field of sunflowers. The St. Joseph Shrine has an altar from the former cathedral convent. The reliquary inside the altar contains relics of ten saints:

- Aurelius of Carthage – Roman bishop of Carthage in the 4th century CE
- Benedict of Nursia – Roman founder of the Order of Saint Benedict in the 6th century
- Clement of Rome – Roman bishop of Rome in the 2nd century CE
- Francis de Sales – French bishop of Geneva in the 17th century
- Iranaeus – Greek bishop and doctor of the church from the 2nd century CE
- Isidore the Farmer – Spanish lay person who helped the poor and farm workers in the 12th century
- John Vianney – French priest of the 19th century
- Martin de Porres – Peruvian lay brother of the 17th century, reported to have performed miracles
- Rose Philippine Duchesne – French religious sister who educated Native Americans in the 19th century
- Vincent de Paul – French priest who founded the Congregation of the Mission and the Daughters of Charity in the 17th century

== Cathedral of St. Joseph Catholic School ==
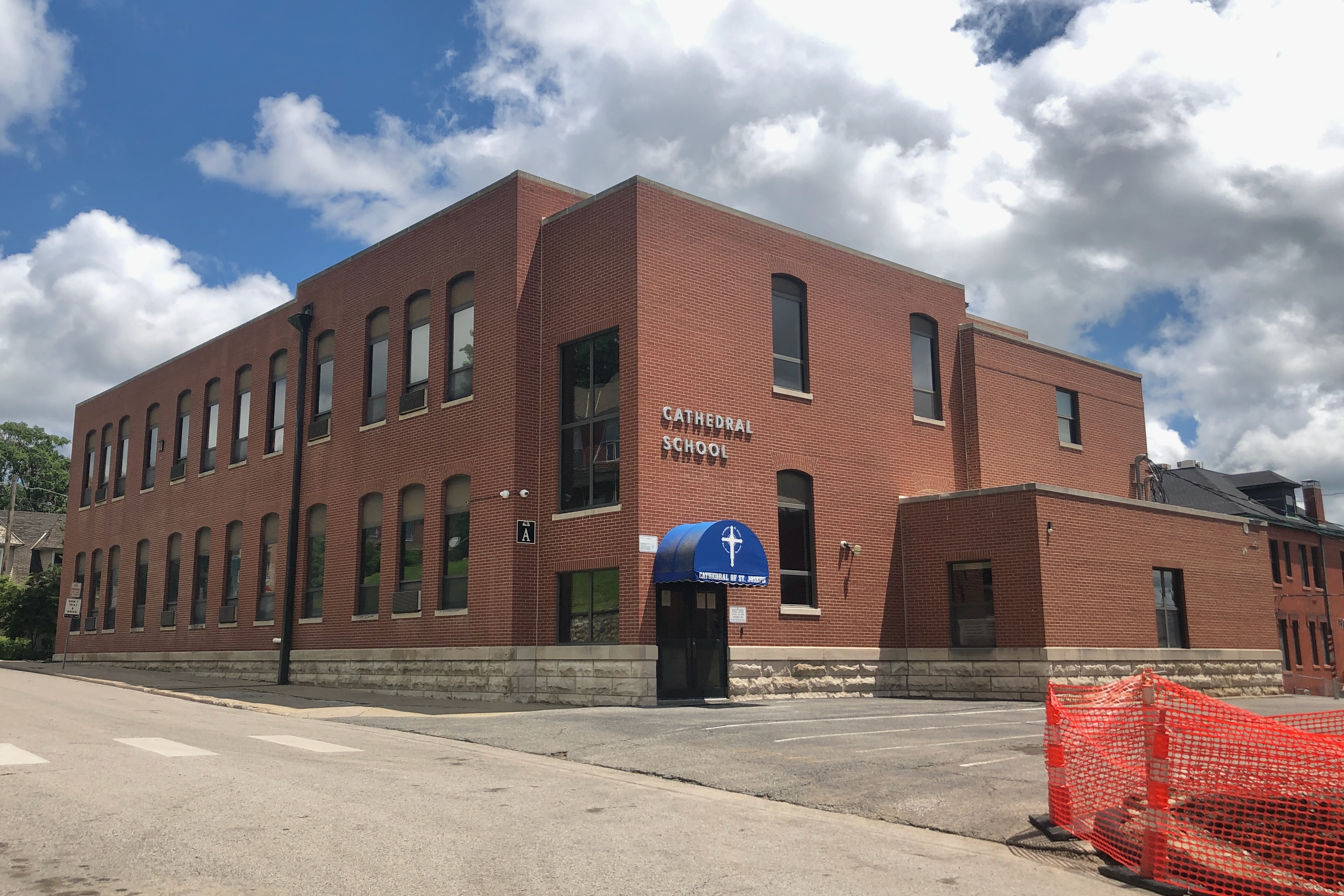
Cathedral of St. Joseph Catholic School (2024)

In 1900, Bishop Burke asked the sisters of the Religious of the Sacred Heart to operated a school on the cathedral grounds. The new school building opened in 1901. By the end of the first year, the enrollment at the Cathedral of St. Joseph Catholic School was 190 boys and girls. The sisters added a high school in 1904 and had 404 students by 1912.

The high school students in 1919 were moved to another school campus and the sisters of the Religious withdrew from St. Joseph Cathedral School. They were replaced by the Benedictine Sisters of Mt. St. Scholastica in 1920. During the 1940s, the diocese removed the third floor of the school as it had deteriorated considerably.

The cathedral school building was renovated in 1954, adding more classrooms. A combination gymnasium and auditorium was built in 1958. By 1964, enrollment had reached 640 student. Pre-school was added in 1981. By the late 1980s, the faculty were all lay people. The convent was converted into a day care center and now houses the Cathedral Early Childhood Center.

== Pastors/ Rectors ==
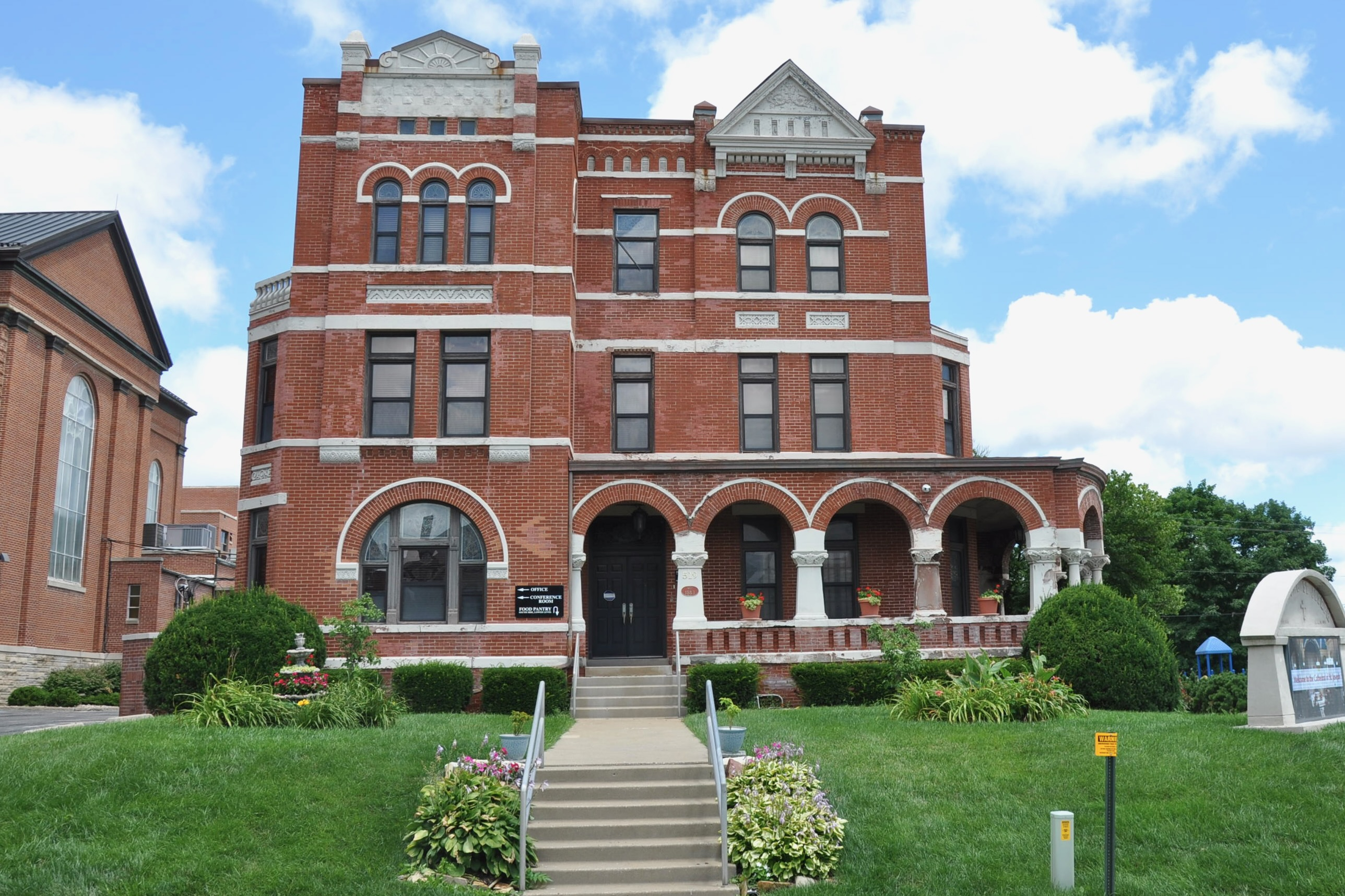
Rectory (2024)

=== Pastors of St. Joseph Parish ===
- Reverend Thomas Scanlan (1845–1860)
- Reverend John Hennessy (1860–1866)
- Reverend James Doherty (1866–1868)

=== Rectors of the Cathedral of Saint Joseph Parish ===
- Bishop John J. Hogan (1868–1876)
- Reverend Ignatius Conrad, O.S.B. (1876–1892)
- Reverend Andrew Newman (1892–1893)
- Bishop M. F. Burke (1893–1913)
- Reverend John J. O’Neill (1913–1923)
- Reverend Maurice F. Connor (1923–1926)
- Reverend Charles F. Buddy (1926–1937)
- Monsignor Leo J. Ruggle (1937–1964)
- Monsignor Charles S. Nowland (1964–1973)
- Monsignor Robert J. Hogan (1973–1979)
- Reverend Gerald R. Waris (1979–1986)
- Reverend Patrick Tobin (1986–1988)
- Reverend Thomas J. D. Hawkins (1988–1995)
- Reverend Wayne L. Walter (1995–1996)
- Monsignor Richard M. Dierkes (1996–2008)
- Reverend Joseph B. Powers (2008–2012)
- Reverend Matthew Rotert (2012–2018)
- Reverend Stephen Hansen (2018–Present)
Images of cathedral campus

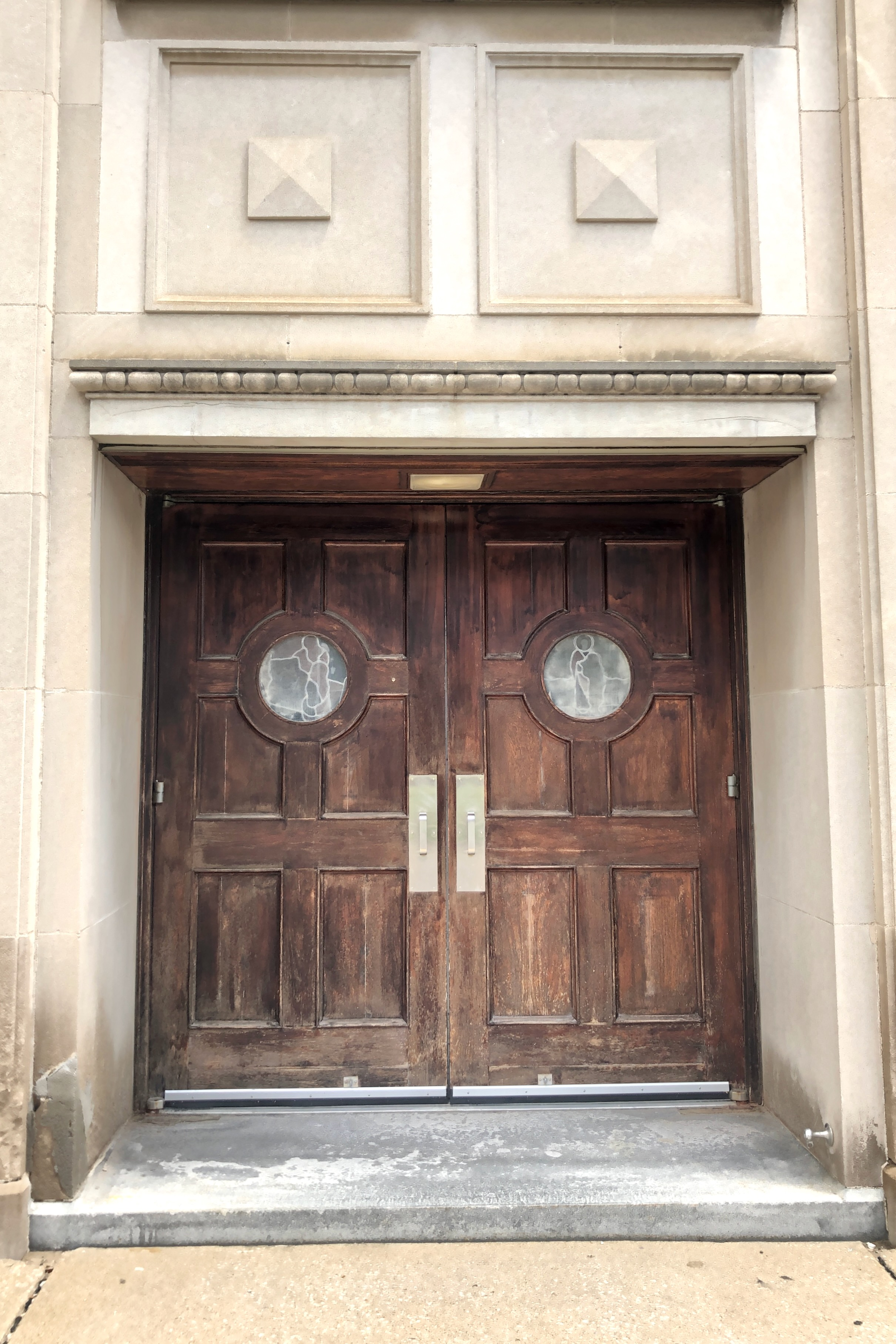
Front doors, cathedral 2024

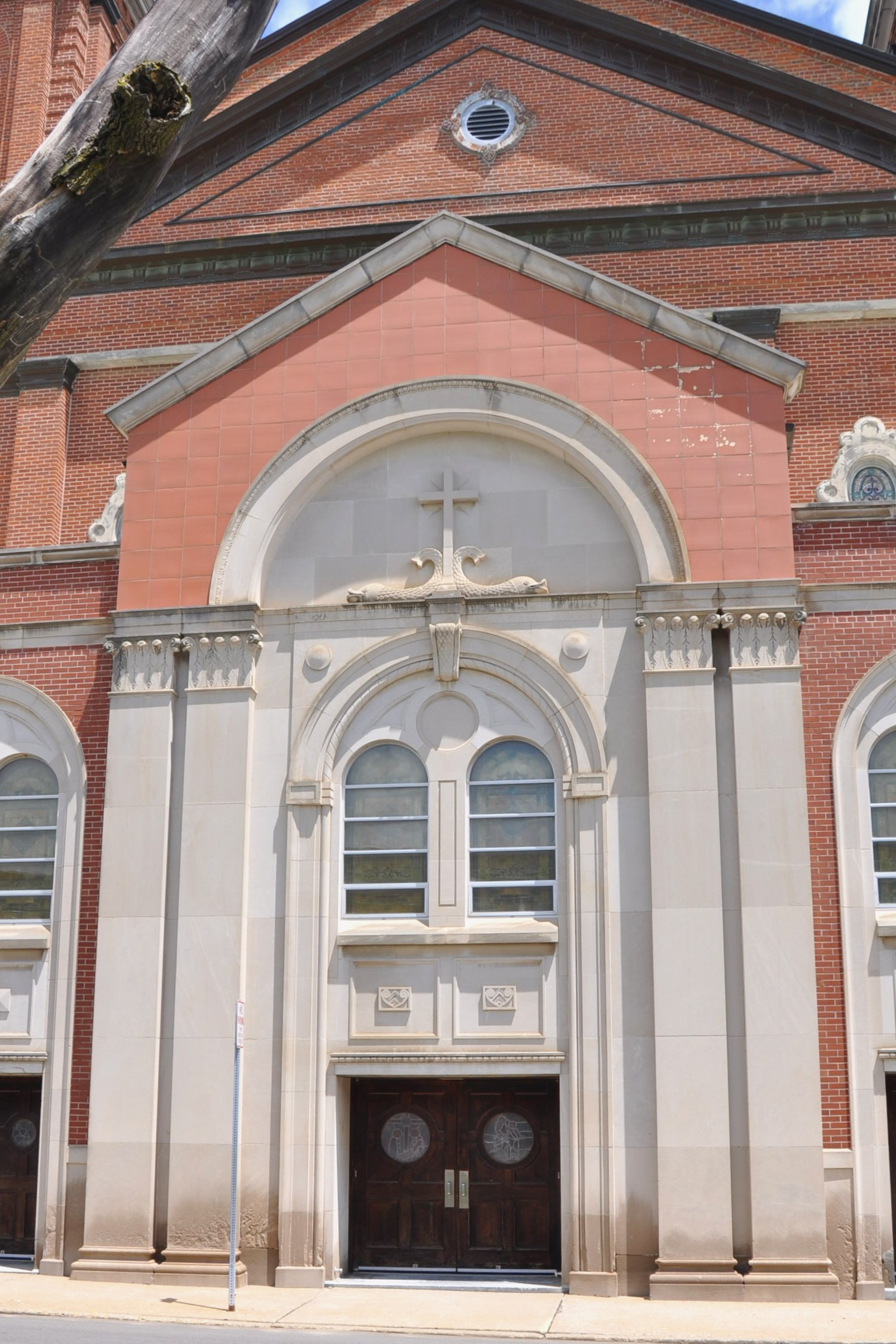
View of front entrance, cathedral (2024)

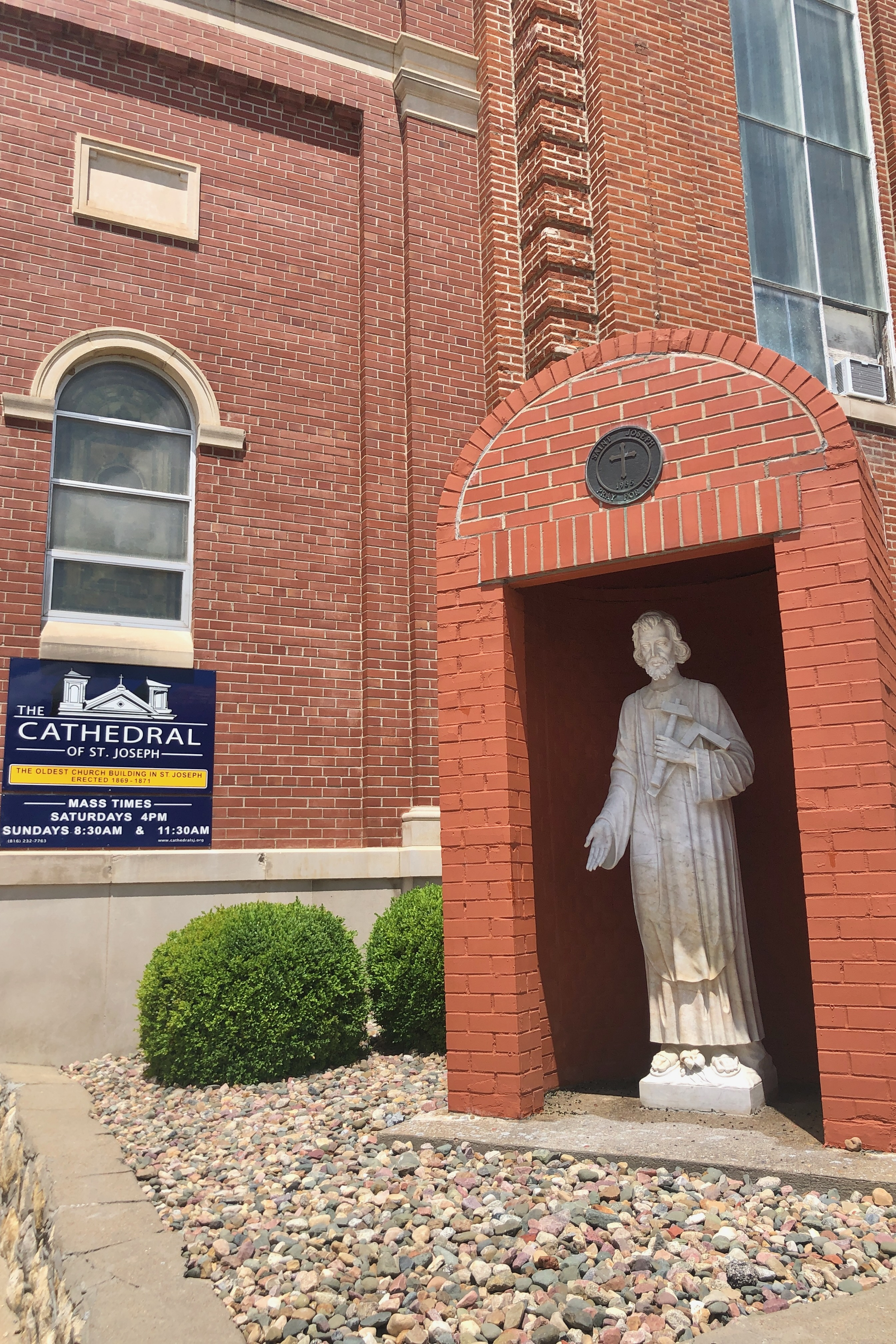
Statue of St. Joseph (2024)

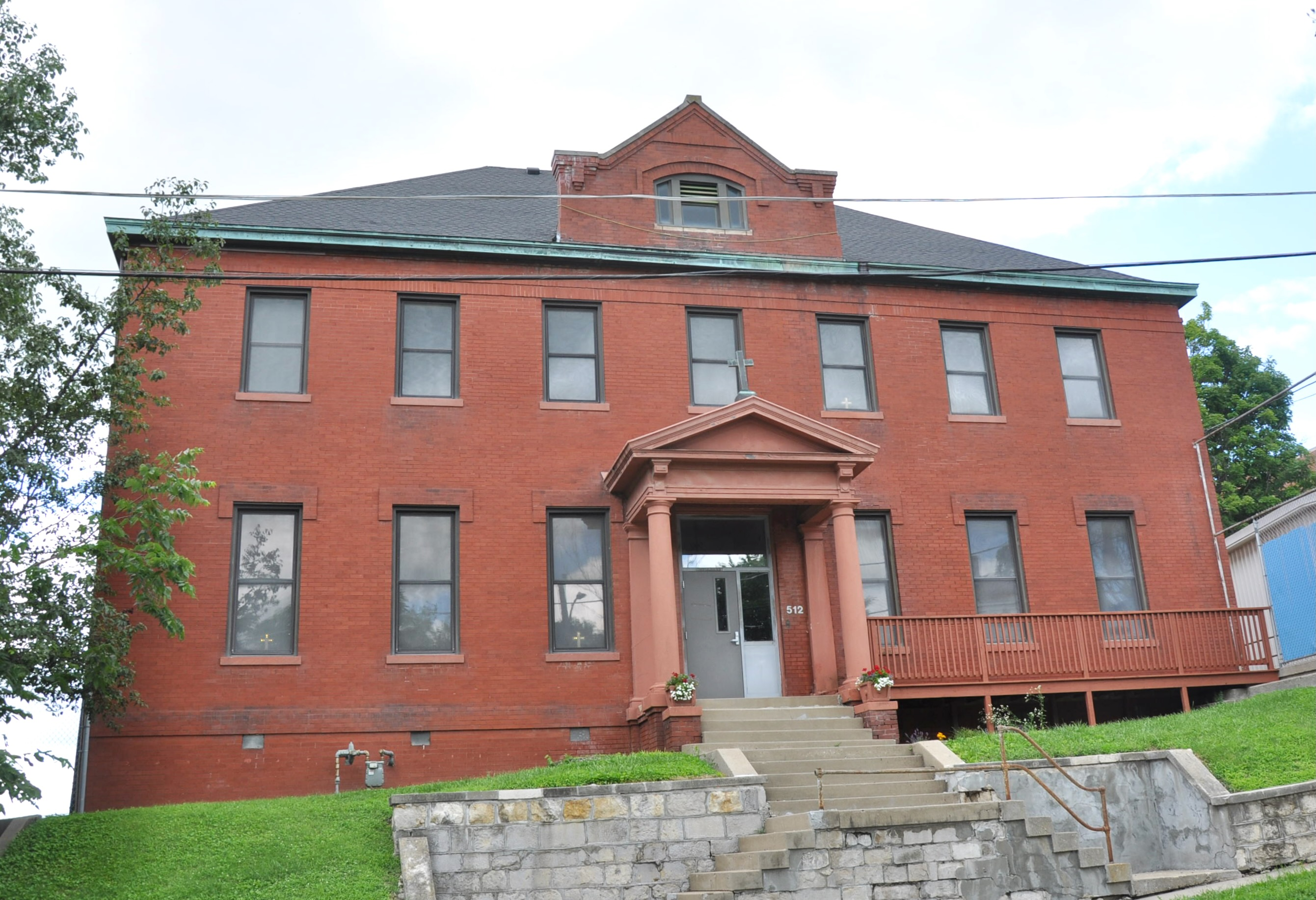
Cathedral Early Childhood Center (2024)

== See also ==
- List of Catholic cathedrals in the United States
- List of cathedrals in the United States
