= Charles Hubert Le Blond =

American prelate

His Excellency, The Most Reverend Charles Hubert Le Blond
- Bishop of St. Joseph
- See: Diocese of St. Joseph
- In office: July 21, 1933; August 24, 1956
- Predecessor: Francis Gilfillan
- Successor: None

Orders
- Ordination: June 29, 1909 by John Patrick Farrelly
- Consecration: July 21, 1933 by Joseph Schrembs

Personal details
- Born: November 21, 1883 Celina, Ohio, US
- Died: December 30, 1958 (aged 75) St. Joseph, Missouri US
- Denomination: Roman Catholic
- Education: St. Mary's Seminary
- Motto: Opere et veritate (In deed and in truth)

Charles Hubert Le Blond (November 21, 1883 – December 30, 1958) was an American prelate of the Roman Catholic Church. He served as bishop of the Diocese of St. Joseph in Missouri from 1933 to 1956.

== Biography ==
=== Early life ===
Charles Le Blond was born on November 21, 1883, in Celina, Ohio. He was one of three children of Charles McGinley and Anne Marie (née Brennan) Le Blond. Charles McGinley was a member of the Ohio House of Representatives from 1886 to 1890. Charles Le Blond was a grandson of U.S. Representative Francis Le Blond and a cousin of Judge Frank Le Blond Kloeb.

When Charles Le Blond was age five, the family moved to Cleveland, Ohio. He received his early education at the parochial school of St. John's Cathedral. He then attended St. Ignatius High School in Cleveland for six years, graduating in 1903. Le Blond studied for the priesthood at St. Mary's Seminary, also in Cleveland.

=== Priesthood ===
Le Blond was ordained a priest by Bishop John Patrick Farrelly for the Diocese of Cleveland on June 29, 1909 in Cleveland. After his ordination, the diocese assigned Le Blond as a curate at the Cathedral of St. John the Evangelist Parish in Cleveland, where he remained for two years. In 1911, he was named director of St. Anthony’s Home for Boys and Young Men in Louisville, Ohio. From 1912 to 1933, he served as the first diocesan director of Catholic Charities and Hospitals. During his tenure as director, he laid a foundation for the many charitable Catholic institutions in the diocese. In 1930, he was one of the delegates sent by the United States to the Pan-American Conference on Child Welfare in Lima, Peru. He also represented the National Catholic Welfare Council at the international conferences on social work in Paris, France (1928) and in Frankfurt, Germany (1932).

=== Bishop of St. Joseph ===
On July 21, 1933, Le Blond was appointed the fourth bishop of St. Joseph by Pope Pius XI. He received his episcopal consecration on September 21, 1933, from Bishop Joseph Schrembs, with Bishops James A. McFadden and Thomas O'Reilly serving as co-consecrators at the Cathedral of Saint John the Evangelist. Le Blond took an interest in welfare work in the city, and was active in the annual Community Chest campaigns. During his tenure as bishop, the number of priests in the diocese increased by 30%, and the Catholic population of the diocese increased by more than 3,000. Due to his failing health, he received Bishop John Cody as a coadjutor bishop in 1954 to manage the daily affairs of the diocese.

=== Retirement and legacy ===
After governing the diocese for twenty-three years, Le Blond resigned as bishop of St. Joseph on August 24, 1956. Following his resignation, the Diocese of St. Joseph was merged with the Diocese of Kansas City to create the Diocese of Kansas City-St. Joseph.

Charles Le Blond died on December 30, 1958, at St. Joseph's Hospital in St. Joseph, Missouri, at age 75. Bishop LeBlond High School in St. Joseph is named in his honor.

Catholic Church titles
Preceded by Francis Gilfillan	Bishop of St. Joseph; 1933–1956	Succeeded by none
