= Cathedral of Saint Joseph, Aleppo =

Coordinates: 36.2149°N 37.1535°E

Saint Joseph's Cathedral
- Arabic: كاتدرائية القديس يوسف
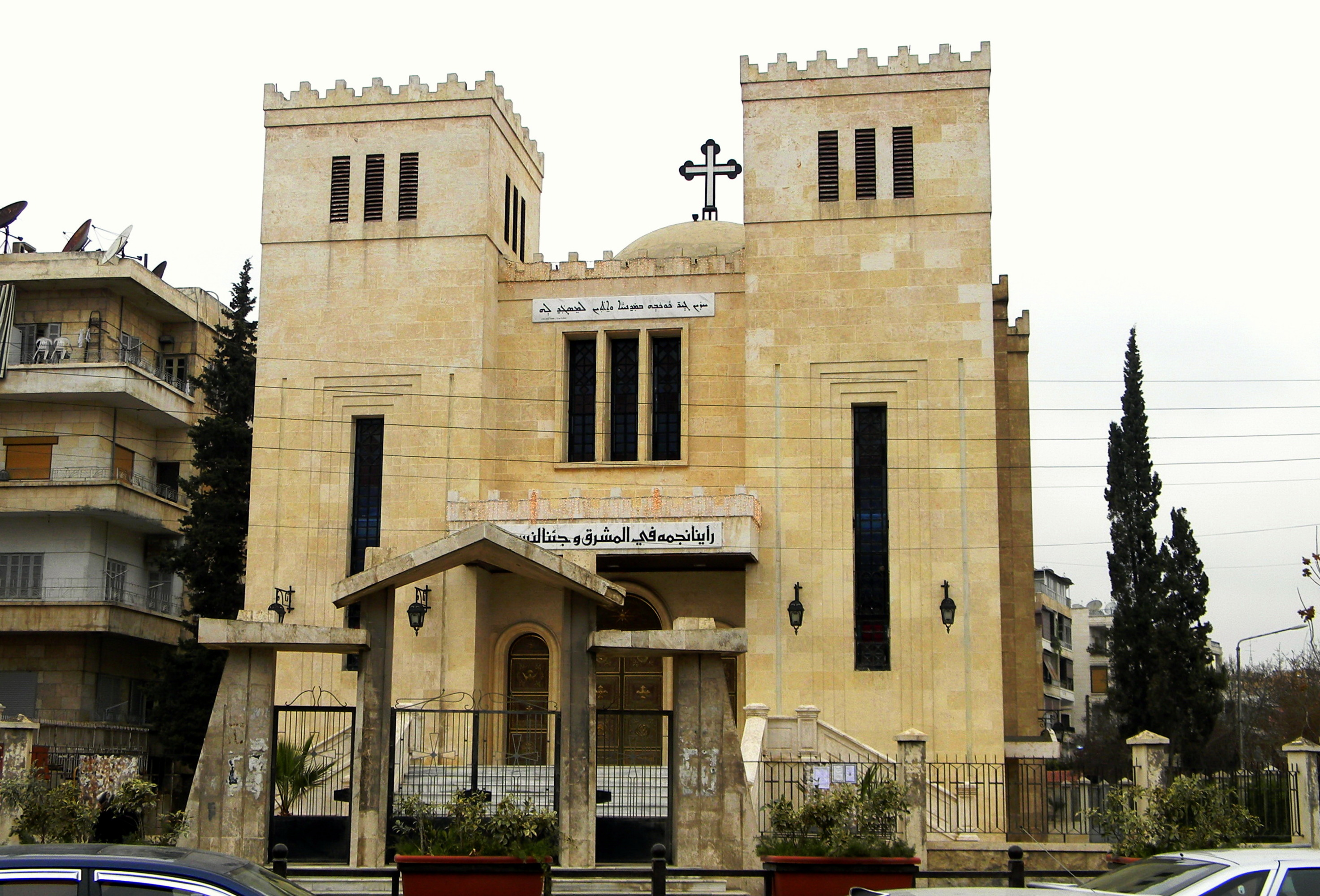
- Saint Joseph's Cathedral
- Location: Aleppo
- Country: Syria
- Denomination: Chaldean Catholic Church

History
- Dedication: Saint Joseph
- Consecrated: 1972

Administration
- Diocese: Chaldean Catholic Eparchy of Aleppo

Clergy
- Bishop(s): Antoine Audo, S.J.

Saint Joseph's Cathedral, (Arabic: كاتدرائية القديس يوسف ) also called the Chaldean Cathedral of Aleppo, is the cathedral in Aleppo, Syria, of the Chaldean Catholic Eparchy of Aleppo of the Chaldean Catholic Church.

The eparchy has been operating since 1957 when it was created by Pope Pius XII through the Bull Quasi Pastor. Its titular bishop is Antoine Audo, S.J. The cathedral is dedicated to Saint Joseph, the adoptive father of Jesus.

It is the episcopal seat of 14 parishes (in 2009) attended by a dozen priests who work for about 35,000 baptised (in 2009).

== See also ==
- Catholic Church in Syria
