= John Joseph Hogan =

American Catholic bishop (1829-1913)

The Right Reverend John Joseph Hogan
- Bishop of Kansas City
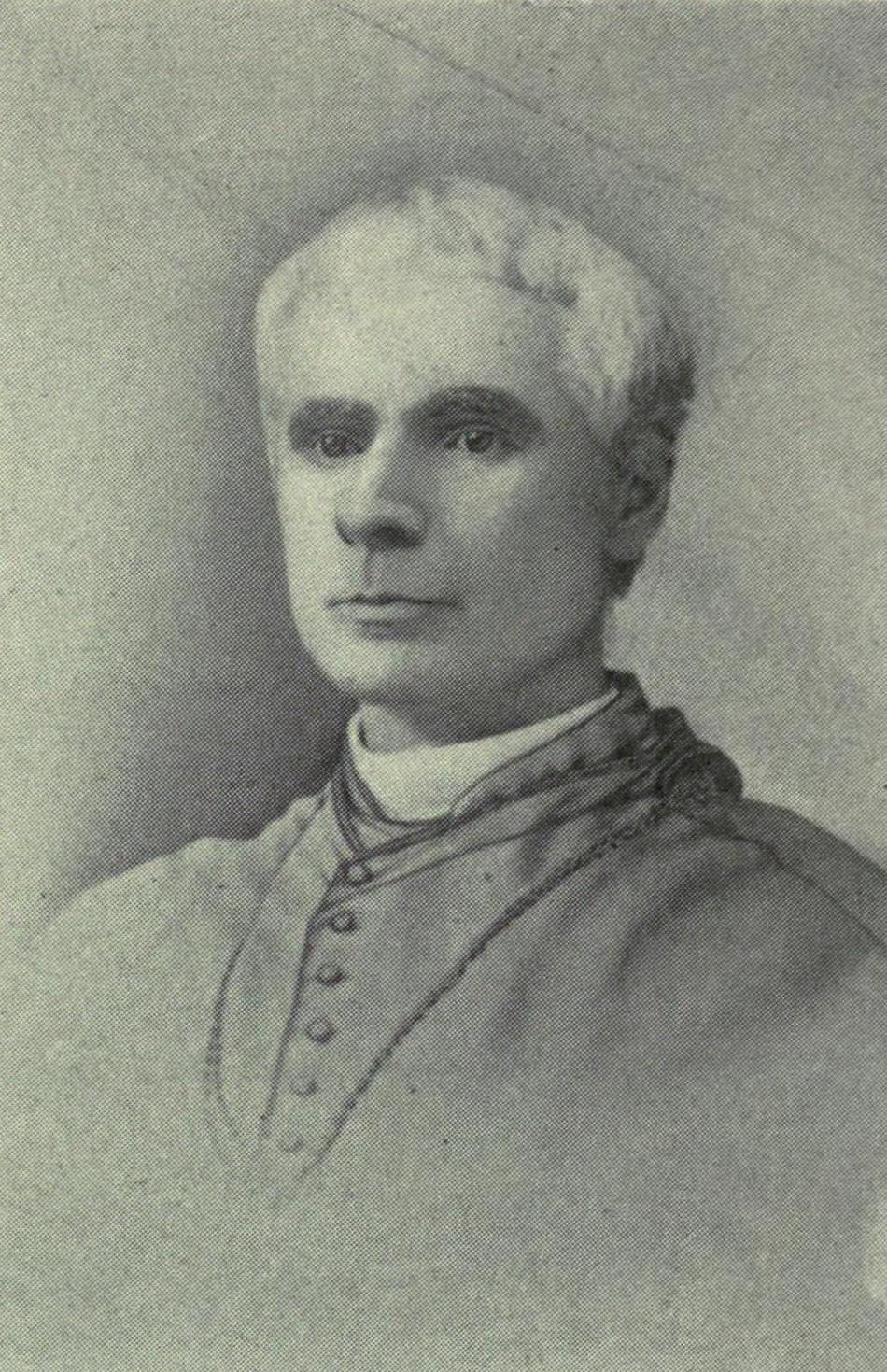
- Church: Catholic Church
- Diocese: Kansas City
- Appointed: September 10, 1880
- Term ended: February 21, 1913
- Predecessor: Office established
- Successor: Thomas Francis Lillis
- Previous post: Bishop of St. Joseph (1868–1880)

Orders
- Ordination: April 10, 1852 by Peter Richard Kenrick
- Consecration: September 13, 1868 by Peter Richard Kenrick

Personal details
- Born: May 10, 1829 Cahir Guillamore, County Limerick, Ireland
- Died: February 21, 1913 (aged 83) Kansas City, Missouri, U.S.

John Joseph Hogan (May 10, 1829 – February 21, 1913) was an American Catholic prelate. A native of Ireland, he came to Missouri as a missionary and served as the first Bishop of St. Joseph (1868–1880) and the first Bishop of Kansas City (1880–1913) before the two dioceses were united.

== Early life and education ==
John Hogan was born on May 10, 1829, in Cahir Guillamore, a townland in County Limerick, Ireland. His father, James Hogan, was a farmer. His mother, Ellen Hogan (née Connor), died in 1832 when John was three years old. John was the second youngest of their nine children. At his confirmation, he took the middle name Joseph.

Hogan received his early education at schools in Raheen and Holycross. From 1839 to 1842, he studied under a private tutor, who taught him Latin, Greek, French, and English. He then attended classical schools at Meanus, Croom, and Herbertstown in County Limerick and at Charleville in County Cork.

At the age of nineteen, Hogan decided to study for the priesthood and become a missionary in the United States. He later recounted:

I had learned from many reliable sources of information that in the far-away Western World, on the banks of the Mississippi, a great diocese was growing up that had immense missionary fields, over which the Church was spreading rapidly. One of my sources of information, the "American Catholic Almanac," sent regularly every year to my father by his brother...gave full description of the diocese of St. Louis... Priests were not needed in Ireland, where for every vacancy there were twenty or more applicants. In the St. Louis diocese it occurred to me that possibly there might be more vacancies than applicants, as it was a new country.

Hogan departed from Ireland in October 1848 and arrived in St. Louis the following December. He was accepted by Archbishop Peter Richard Kenrick as a candidate for the priesthood, and completed his philosophical and theological studies at the diocesan seminary in Carondelet.

== Priesthood ==
Hogan was ordained a priest on April 10, 1852, by Archbishop Kenrick. He then served as an assistant pastor at St. Joachim Church in Old Mines for a year. While there, he taught a catechism class to about 40 African Americans, preparing them for First Communion. He then served as pastor of St. James Church in Potosi for two years before being recalled to St. Louis in 1854, serving as an assistant at St. John Church for a year. From 1855 to 1857, he served as pastor of St. Michael Church in St. Louis.

In 1857, after repeated requests, Hogan received permission from Archbishop Kenrick to start Catholic missions in northern Missouri, with Father Patrick Feehan (the future Archbishop of Chicago) succeeding him as pastor of St. Michael Church. Hogan established his base at Chillicothe, where he erected St. Columban Church in 1858. For the next 10 years, he traveled between Chillicothe, Macon, Brookfield, Mexico, and Cameron, making monthly visits to each city to provide the sacraments.

=== Irish Wilderness ===
In 1858, in addition to his work in northern Missouri, Hogan established a settlement for Irish Catholics (now known as the Irish Wilderness) in Oregon County. Years earlier, during his time in St. Louis, he had observed that many Irish Catholic young women in the city were unmarried; meanwhile, Irish Catholic young men were constantly moving as railroad workers. He believed that "ownership and cultivation of land" would solve this issue, enabling Irish Catholics in Missouri to secure "a settled and permanent mode of existence."

Hogan purchased land in the southern part of the state near the Arkansas border, where the price of land was cheaper than in northern Missouri. He later recounted:

Soon improvements went on apace; cutting down trees, splitting rails, burning brushwood, making fences, grubbing roots and stumps, building houses, digging wells, opening roads, breaking and ploughing land, and sewing crops. Already in the spring of 1859, there were about forty families on the newly acquired government lands, or on improved farms purchased, east and west of Current River, in the counties of Ripley and Oregon; and many more were coming, so that the settlement was fairly striding towards final success.

However, the settlement collapsed during the Civil War, under the intense conflict in the region given Missouri's status as a border state. Hogan later recounted: "The [settlement] in Southern Missouri especially became broken and scattered; all who could, having fled therefrom. Ripley County, in which my southern settlement was principally located, suffered more than any other part of the state."

=== Postwar activities ===
With many schools left without teachers or funding during the Civil War, Hogan opened a school for Catholic and non-Catholic children at Chillicothe in 1861. He operated the school for two years, until the reorganization of the public school system.

In 1865, the Missouri Constitutional Convention amended the state constitution, adding a requirement for all clergy to swear a loyalty oath under penalty of fine and imprisonment. Hogan refused to take the oath, believing it was "very foolish" for the state government to "assume an authority that does not belong to it, and to declare in contravention of God's ordination, who shall or shall not preach or teach the Gospel of Christ." In his opinion, the oath was not a question of "loyalty or disloyalty," but "whether the Church shall be free or not, to exercise her natural and inherent right of calling into or rejecting from her ministry whom she pleases." After delivering several sermons without taking the oath, Hogan was indicted by a grand jury in December 1865. He was subsequently escorted to the Livingston County Courthouse, where he posted bail. With Mordecai Oliver serving as his attorney, he was initially arraigned in Chillicothe before his case was transferred to Adair County. In 1867, however, his case was dismissed after the U.S. Supreme Court ruled in favor of another Catholic priest who had been convicted on the same charge in Cummings v. Missouri.

== Episcopal career ==
=== Bishop of St. Joseph ===
At the Second Plenary Council of Baltimore in 1866, the Catholic bishops of the United States recommended the creation of several new dioceses, including the Diocese of St. Joseph in northern Missouri. On March 3, 1868, Pope Pius IX officially erected the diocese and named Hogan as its first bishop.

Hogan received his episcopal consecration on September 13, 1868, from Archbishop Kenrick at the Cathedral of St. Louis, with Bishops John Baptist Miège and Patrick Feehan serving as co-consecrators. Shortly afterward, from 1869 to 1870, he attended the First Vatican Council.

At the beginning of Hogan's tenure in 1868, the Diocese of St. Joseph contained five priests and 3,000 Catholics. By the end of his tenure in 1880, the diocese had 26 priests and 30 churches to serve a Catholic population of 18,000. He laid the cornerstone of the new Cathedral of St. Joseph in September 1869.

=== Bishop of Kansas City ===
On September 10, 1880, Pope Leo XIII created the Diocese of Kansas City in southwestern Missouri and appointed Hogan as its first bishop. In addition to his new diocese, he remained as apostolic administrator of the Diocese of St. Joseph until the appointment of Bishop Maurice Francis Burke in 1893.

In 1880, at the beginning of his tenure, the Diocese of Kansas City had 42 churches and 30 priests to serve a Catholic population of 12,000. By the time of his death in 1913, the diocese had 117 priests, 75 churches with a resident priest, 26 missions with churches, 15 stations, 30 chapels, 48 parochial schools, and 60,000 Catholics. Hogan laid the cornerstone of the new Cathedral of the Immaculate Conception in 1882.

In June 1896, at the age of 67, Hogan received John J. Glennon as a coadjutor bishop of Kansas City. However, Glennon was appointed coadjutor archbishop of St. Louis in April 1903, succeeding Archbishop John Joseph Kain upon the latter's death the following October. In 1910, Thomas Francis Lillis was named as coadjutor to Hogan in Kansas City.

== Death and legacy ==
Hogan died on February 21, 1913, at his residence in Kansas City. At the age of 83, and having served as a bishop for 44 years, he was the oldest American Catholic bishop in terms of age and length of service. He is buried at Mount St. Mary's Cemetery in Kansas City.

Hogan Preparatory Academy in Kansas City and Bishop Hogan Memorial School in Chillicothe are named in his honor.

== Views ==
=== Slavery ===
While traveling on a steamboat in northern Missouri in 1857, Hogan observed the condition of enslaved people aboard the ship with strong disapproval. In his memoir On the Mission in Missouri, 1857-1868, he wrote:

The groans of the poor fellows, as they clanked their manacled hands against the deck, or dragged and slashed in pain their booted heels on the rough boards on which they lay, were truly heartrending. They were accused of no crime, were torn away without a minute's notice from their homes, husbands separated from wives and children, sons separated parents, brothers and sisters. All were forced to leave dear friends and loved scenes behind them. Love of money caused it all.

He also noted that, during his time as a seminarian in St. Louis, he wrote an essay on slavery that was "somewhat in the strain of Thomas Moore and Daniel O'Connell on the same subject." According to Hogan, his professor then warned him that, when he began work as a missionary, "if you give expression to sentiments such as these, you will be driven from home decorated with a coat of tar and feathers, and fortunate you will be, if nothing worse befalls you."

=== Civil War ===
During the Civil War, Hogan supported the Union, criticizing the Confederacy for adopting "the bad principle of national disruption." He praised the Missouri Constitutional Convention for voting against secession, saying, "Missouri owes an everlasting debt of gratitude to her steady and wise statesmen, who safeguarded her destiny in that dark and tempestuous hour."

== Sources ==
- Hogan, John J. (1907). Fifty Years Ago: A Memoir. Kansas City, MO: Franklin Hudson Publishing Co.
- Hogan, John J. (1892). On the Mission in Missouri, 1857-1868. Kansas City, MO: John A. Heilmann.

Catholic Church titles
Preceded by Office established	Bishop of Saint Joseph; 1868–1880	Succeeded by Maurice Francis Burke
Preceded by Office established	Bishop of Kansas City; 1880–1913	Succeeded by Thomas Francis Lillis
