= Old Cathedral of St. Joseph, Tokyo =

Coordinates: 35.6682°N 139.7771°E

Cathedral of St. Joseph
- 聖ヨゼフ聖堂
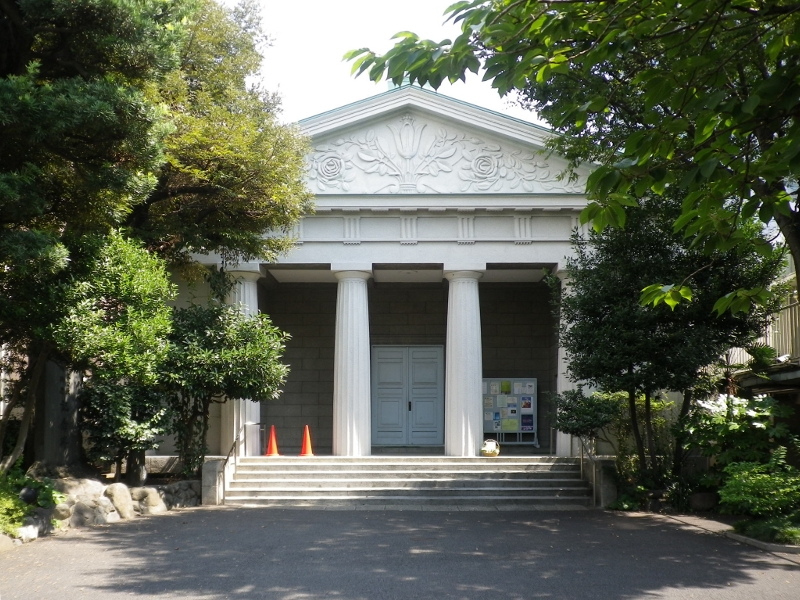
- Cathedral of St. Joseph
- Location: Tokyo
- Country: Japan
- Denomination: Roman Catholic Church

The Cathedral of St. Joseph (Japanese: 聖ヨゼフ聖堂) also called St. Joseph's Church is the name given to a historic Catholic church, located in Tsukiji area, Akashi-cho, Chuo-ku, Tokyo, Japan. The temple was consecrated in honor of Saint Joseph. It stands out as the first Catholic church in Tokyo.

The church was founded by missionaries of the Paris Foreign Missions Society, which was established in Tokyo in 1871. On July 2, 1874, they bought a 900-square-metre (9,700 sq ft) piece of land from the Japanese government and began construction, which was completed on November 22 of the same year. After this, the church became the center of Catholic missionaries who worked in Japan, especially in the north of Tokyo. In 1874, the bishop of Tokyo gave the church the status of cathedral and seat of the Apostolic Vicariate of Northern Japan (now called Archdiocese of Tokyo). In December 1874 began a restructuring of the temple, which ended on November 15, 1878.

The 1923 Great Kantō earthquake destroyed the church and rebuilt in 1927. La Madeleine, Paris inspired its designs reflecting the neoclassical architecture of Ancient Greek temple, with a façade of six doric order columns and a gable with lilies and roses carving.

On June 1, 1999, the Japanese government declared it as a historic building in Tokyo.

The Church of St. Joseph was the cathedral until 1920, when the local bishop moved to St. Mary's Cathedral, Tokyo. Its parish priest is Fr. Leo Shumacher, S.S.C.

In June 2024, Archbishop Tarcisio Isao Kikuchi led the Thanksgiving Mass celebrations for the Cathedral's 150 years of foundation, with a recital of Pope Francis’ message of 'blessing'.

== See also ==
- Roman Catholicism in Japan
