= Maurice Francis Burke =

Irish-born prelate (1845–1923)

His Excellency, The Right Reverend Maurice Francis Burke
- Bishop of Saint Joseph
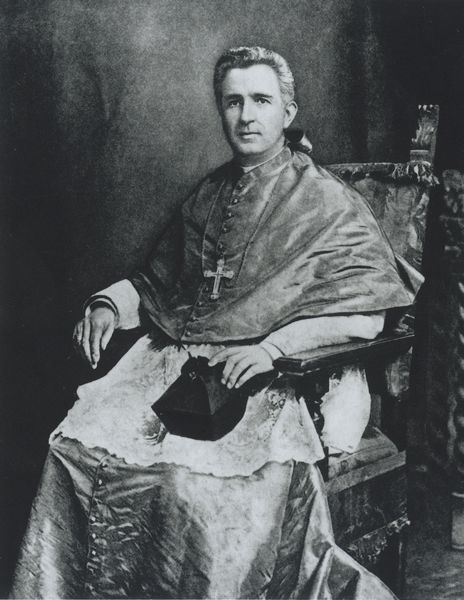
- See: Diocese of Saint Joseph
- Predecessor: John Joseph Hogan
- Successor: Francis Gilfillan
- Other posts: Bishop of Cheyenne; 1887 - 1893

Orders
- Ordination: May 22, 1875 by Costantino Patrizi Naro
- Consecration: October 28, 1887 by Patrick Feehan

Personal details
- Born: May 5, 1845 Knockainy, County Limerick, Ireland
- Died: May 17, 1923 (aged 78) St. Joseph, Missouri, US
- Denomination: Roman Catholic
- Education: University of Saint Mary of the Lake; University of Notre Dame; Pontifical North American College
- Motto: Fides spes charitas (Faith, hope, charity)
- Coat of arms

Maurice Francis Burke (May 5, 1845 – March 17, 1923) was an Irish-born prelate of the Roman Catholic Church. He served as bishop of the Diocese of Cheyenne in Wyoming (1887–1893) and as bishop of the Diocese of Saint Joseph in Missouri (1893–1923).

== Biography ==
=== Early life ===
Maurice Burke was born on May 5, 1845, in Knockainy, County Limerick, in Ireland to Francis Noonan and Joanna (née Casey) Burke. When he was four years old, his family immigrated to the United States, settling in Chicago, Illinois. He received his education at the University of Saint Mary of the Lake in Chicago and at the University of Notre Dame in Notre Dame, Indiana. Burke continued his studies at the Pontifical North American College in Rome.

=== Priesthood ===
Burke was ordained to the priesthood for the Archdiocese of Chicago by Cardinal Costantino Patrizi Naro in Rome on May 22, 1875. On his return to Chicago, Burke was assigned to serve as a curate at St. Mary's Parish in that city. After three years, he was appointed pastor of St. Mary's Church in Joliet, Illinois.

=== Bishop of Cheyenne ===
On August 9, 1887, Burke was appointed the first bishop of the new Diocese of Cheyenne by Pope Leo XIII. Burke received his episcopal consecration on October 28, 1887, from Archbishop Patrick Feehan, with Bishops William McCloskey and Henry Cosgrove serving as co-consecrators, at Holy Name Cathedral in Chicago.

By 1889, the diocese had five priests and 5,000 parishioners spread over a huge area. In addition, he faced attacks by the American Protective Association, an anti-Catholic and anti-Irish hate group. The virulence forced the Sisters of Charity to abandon their institutions in the diocese. Burke travelled to Rome to petition the Vatican to attach the diocese to a more established one, citing the dire conditions in Wyoming. The pope denied his request. In a letter to Mother Katherine Drexel, Burke described himself as a "bishop in name only" without parishioners or priests. In 1893, Pope Leo XIII attached the Diocese of Cheyenne to the ecclesiastical province of Dubuque, and transferred Burke to another diocese.

=== Bishop of Saint Joseph ===
Pope Leo XIII appointed Burke as bishop of Saint Joseph on June 19, 1893. During his tenure in Saint Joseph, he liquidated the heavy debt incurred by the construction of its cathedral, built an episcopal residence and a school for the cathedral parish, and opened new missions and parishes. Burke was considered an authority on the Italian writer Dante Alighieri and served as president of the American Dante Society.

=== Death and legacy ===
After three years of failing health, Maurice Burke died in St. Joseph, Missouri, on May 12, 1923, at age 77. Burke's collection of 3,000 books was donated to the Catholic University of America in Washington, D.C.

Catholic Church titles
Preceded by none	Bishop of Cheyenne; 1887–1893	Succeeded by Thomas Mathias Lenihan
Preceded by John Joseph Hogan	Bishop of Saint Joseph; 1893–1923	Succeeded by Francis Gilfillan
