= KCHI =

KCHI may refer to:

- KCHI (AM), a radio station (1010 AM) licensed to Chillicothe, Missouri, United States
- KCHI-FM, a radio station (98.5 FM) licensed to Chillicothe, Missouri, United States
