= Adrian Wewer =

American architect

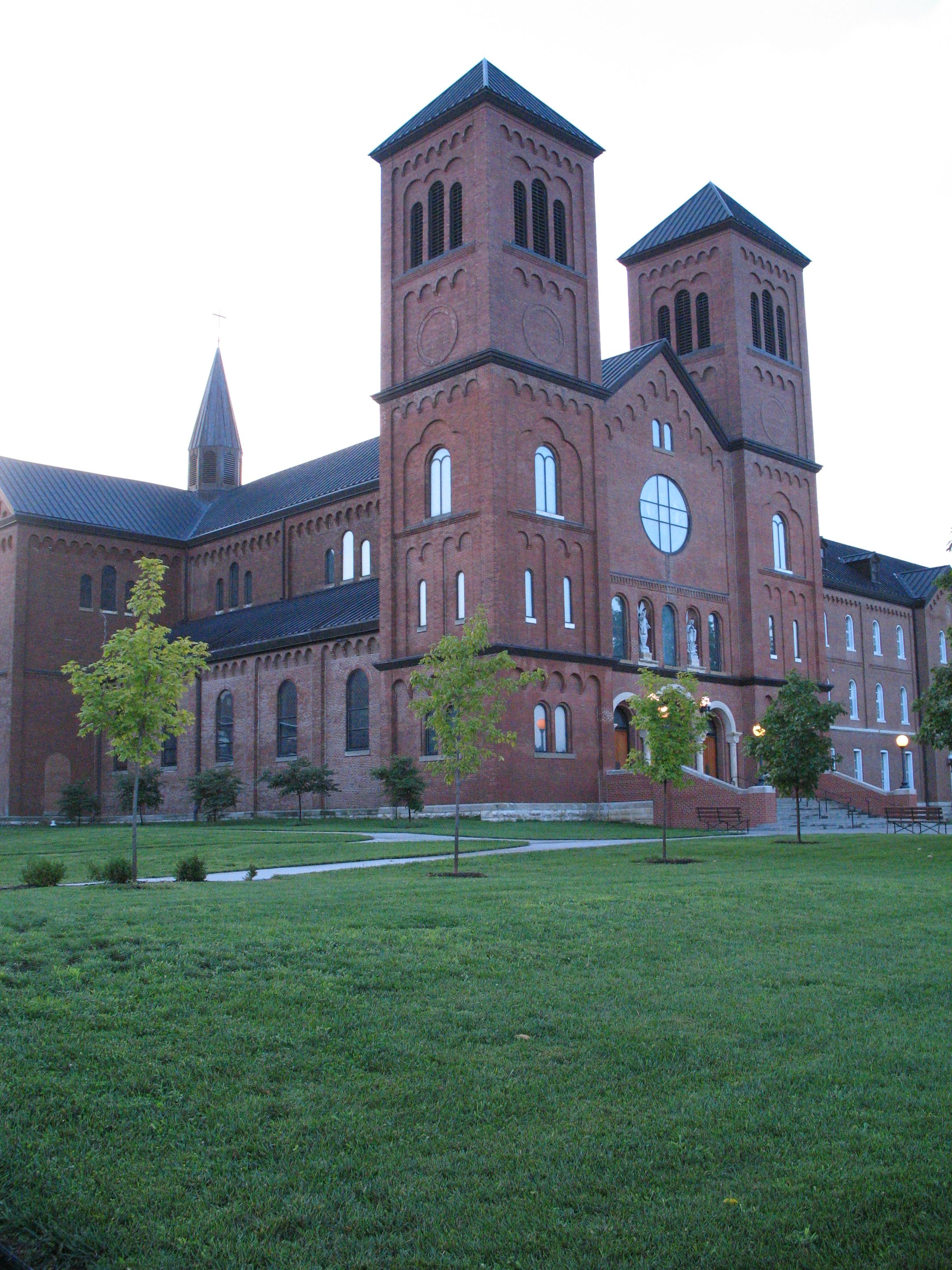
Conception Abbey, Conception, Missouri

Adrian Wewer, O.F.M. (April 14, 1836 – March 15, 1914), was a German-born Franciscan lay brother who designed more than 100 churches, college buildings, seminaries, schools, friaries, convents, and hospitals throughout the United States. He primarily worked in the Neo-Gothic style of architecture then popular.

== Life ==
He was born Antonius Wewer in 1836 in Harsewinkel, in the Prussian state of Westphalia, and as a teenager was trained as a carpenter. In 1858 he was admitted to the novitiate of the Friars Minor of the Province of the Holy Cross located in Warendorf in the Kingdom of Saxony, at which time he was given his religious name of Adrian. That same year the friars received a request from Henry Damian Juncker, the Bishop of Alton in Illinois, to help to care for the large German Catholic population which had settled in the region.

The first Friars Minor arrived that same year, and settled in Teutopolis, Illinois. Wewer was one of a group of five friars who arrived in November 1862 to assist with projects of the friars in Illinois and Missouri. He was initially based at St. Anthony of Padua Parish in St. Louis, Missouri, where he designed the church built 1864-1869, after he had built his first church in Trowbridge, Illinois, in Shelby County, in 1864. He also participated in the design of the interior altars and furnishings of the first St. Francis Solanus Church in Quincy, Illinois. After that church was demolished in 1887, the altars were moved to the new church.

Wewer's work was so prolific and well appreciated, that, on the occasion of his Golden Jubilee as a member of the Order in 1908, he received a personal letter of appreciation from Pope Pius X. He was later sent to San Francisco, where he died in 1914.

Wewer's most notable structures are the Conception Abbey in Conception, Missouri and Francis Hall at Quincy University in Quincy, Illinois.

== Works ==
=== Indiana ===
Archdiocese of Indianapolis:

- Sacred Heart of Jesus Church, Indianapolis, Indiana

Diocese of Evansville:

- St. Anthony of Padua Church, Evansville, Indiana

=== Illinois ===
Diocese of Springfield in Illinois:

- St. Mary Church, Quincy, Illinois
- St. Francis Solanus Church, Quincy, Illinois (demolished, furnishings retained in the new church)
- St. Patrick Church, Trowbridge, Illinois (demolished)
- St. Anthony of Padua Church, Quincy, Illinois (demolished)
- St. Augustine Church, Chicago, Illinois (demolished)

=== Minnesota ===
Archdiocese of Saint Paul - Minneapolis:

- St. John the Evangelist Church, Union Hill, Minnesota
- St. Benedict Church, Saint Benedict, Minnesota (demolished)
- St. John the Baptist Church, Jordan, Minnesota
- St. Joseph Church, Waconia, Minnesota
- Ss. Peter and Paul Church, Belle Plaine, Minnesota (now Our Lady of the Prairie)

=== Missouri ===
Archdiocese of St. Louis:

- St. Anthony of Padua Church, St. Louis, Missouri (demolished)
- St. Francis Borgia Church, Washington, Missouri

Diocese of Kansas City-Saint Joseph:

- Conception Abbey, Conception, Missouri
- St. Columban Church, Chillicothe, Missouri

Diocese of Jefferson City, Missouri:

- St. George Church, Hermann, Missouri
- St. Mary Church, New Cambria, Missouri

=== Wisconsin ===
Diocese of Superior:

- St. Francis Xavier Church, Superior, Wisconsin
- Holy Family Church, Bayfield, Wisconsin
- St. Louis Church, Washburn, Wisconsin

=== California ===
Archdiocese of San Francisco:

- St. Boniface Church, San Francisco, California

Diocese of Sacramento:

- St. Francis Church, Sacramento, California
