= John Quinn (Missouri politician) =

American politician

John Quinn (born September 8, 1950) is a farmer and former Republican member of the Missouri House of Representatives. He resides in Chillicothe, Missouri, with his wife Mary and has four daughters. He is Catholic.

He was born in Marceline, Missouri, and graduated in 1968 from St. Joseph Academy. He then went on to attend Northwest Missouri State University and the University of Missouri. He has been a self-employed farmer for thirty years.

He is a member of the Knights of Columbus, a past county president of the American Farm Bureau, past chair of the Livingston County Soil & Water Board, a board member of the Missouri Corn Growers Association, the Missouri Soybean Association, Show-Me Quality Grain, the Chillichothe Chamber of Commerce, Ducks Unlimited, and the National Rifle Association of America.

He was first elected to the Missouri House of Representatives in a special election in 2001, winning reelection in 2002 and 2004. He served on the following committees:

- Appropriations - Agriculture and Natural Resources (chair),
- Agriculture Policy,
- Budget,
- Corrections and Public Institutions.
