= St. Columban Catholic Church, Chillicothe =

Church building in Chillicothe, MO, USA

Coordinates: 39°47′55.42″N 93°32′56.54″W

This is the history of St. Columban parish in Chillicothe, Missouri.

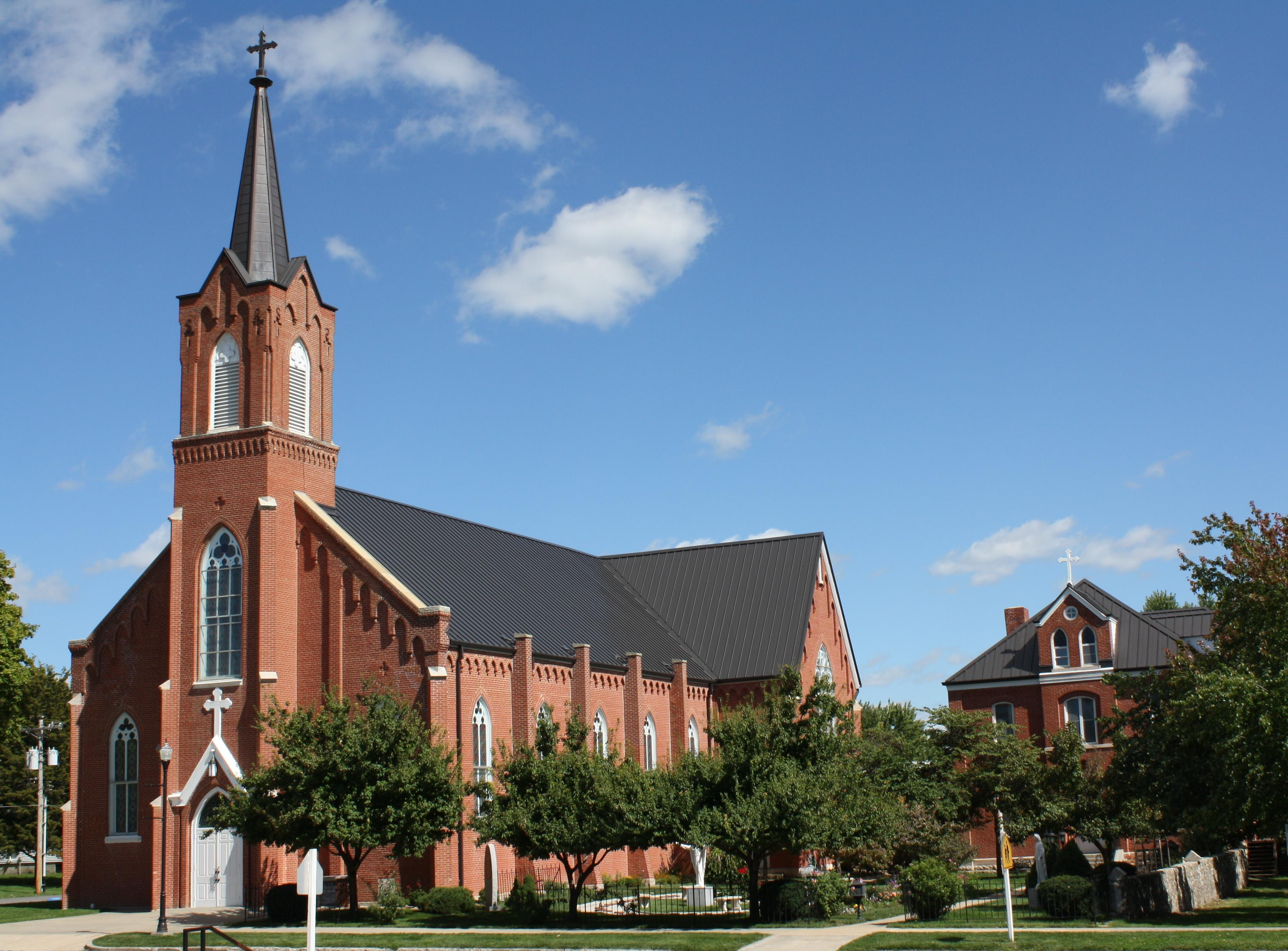
Current exterior of the church

The first St. Columban church was built in 1858 by John Joseph Hogan, who became the first Bishop of the Diocese of Saint Joseph in 1868.

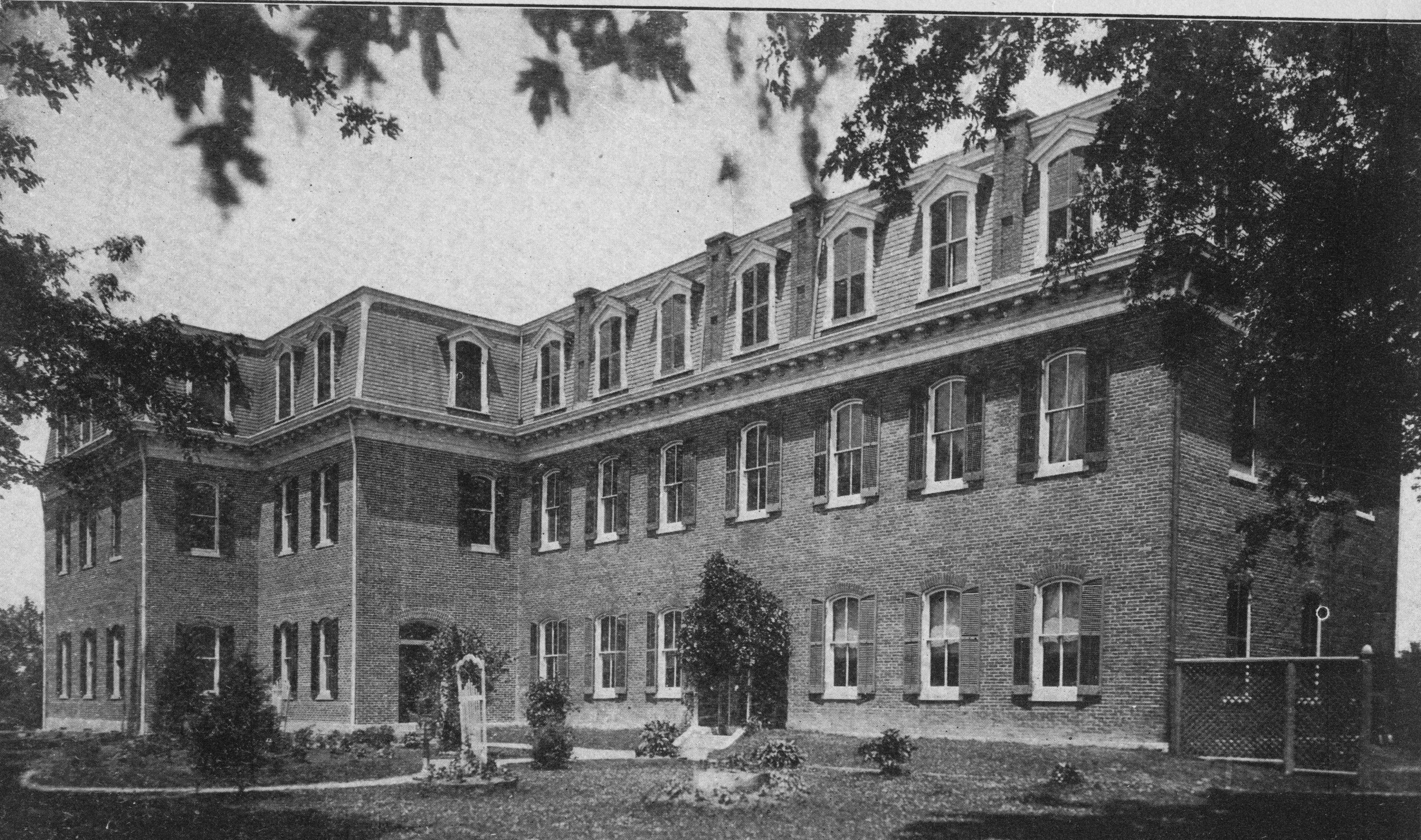

In 1872, St. Joseph's Academy boarding and day school (to the left) began its 97-year tradition. In 1917 the first boy was admitted. The Sisters of St. Joseph of Carondelet in St. Louis ran the school for 63 years, until 1935 when the Sisters of St. Francis of Savannah replaced them. In 1905 the Franciscans would write: "The prosperous condition of the Church in Chillicothe is greatly due to the Academy."

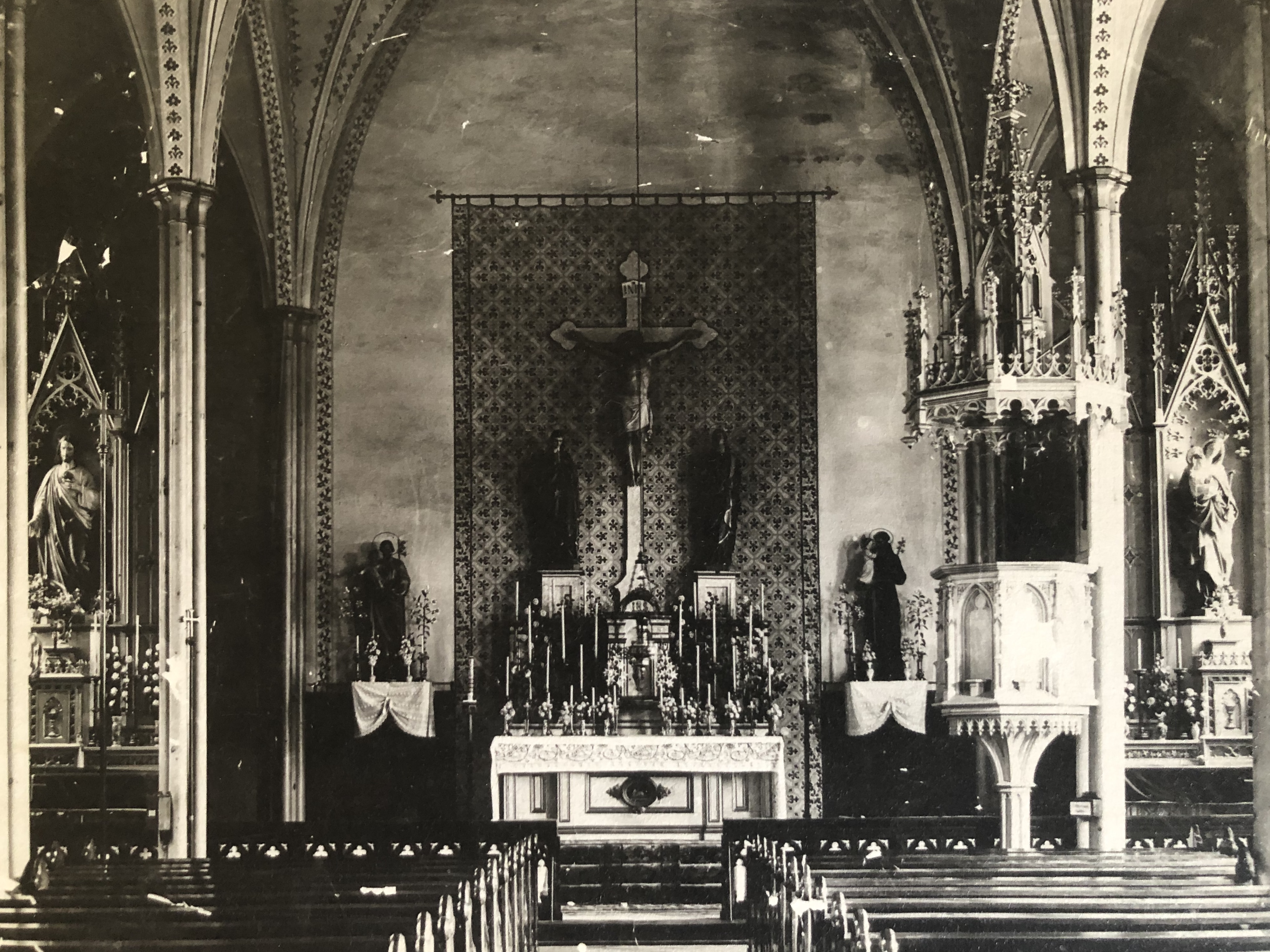
Church sanctuary in 1893 prior to expansion

The Friars Minor, who had come to the United States in 1875 fleeing the Kulturkampf in Germany, came to Chillicothe in 1878 at the invitation of Hogan. They took charge of the parish and the next year, across Trenton Street from the Academy, built the present church, designed by Franciscan Brother Adrian Wewer. In 1880 a parish elementary school, College Hall, opened.

In 1892 the present rectory was built as a Franciscan monastery with 30 rooms plus a spacious attic. The previous rectory was located directly to the east of the church and needed to be moved to make way for an expansion of the church building. The parish then numbered about 100 families, fairly evenly divided between farmers, railroad people, and other business people. In 1894 the church was expanded, adding an apse and two transepts containing large stained-glass windows made by George A. Misch and Brothers of Chicago. The south window depicts the three patrons of the Franciscan order: Saint Clare of Assisi, St. Louis IX, King of France, and Saint Elizabeth. The north window shows the Holy Family of Jesus, Mary, and Joseph. The four stained-glass windows in the apse depict Saint Francis receiving the stigmata, the Annunciation, the child Jesus appearing to Saint Anthony, and St. Margaret Mary Alacoque receiving the devotion to the Sacred Heart. Much of the statuary dates back to the late 19th century and was manufactured in Munich, Germany.

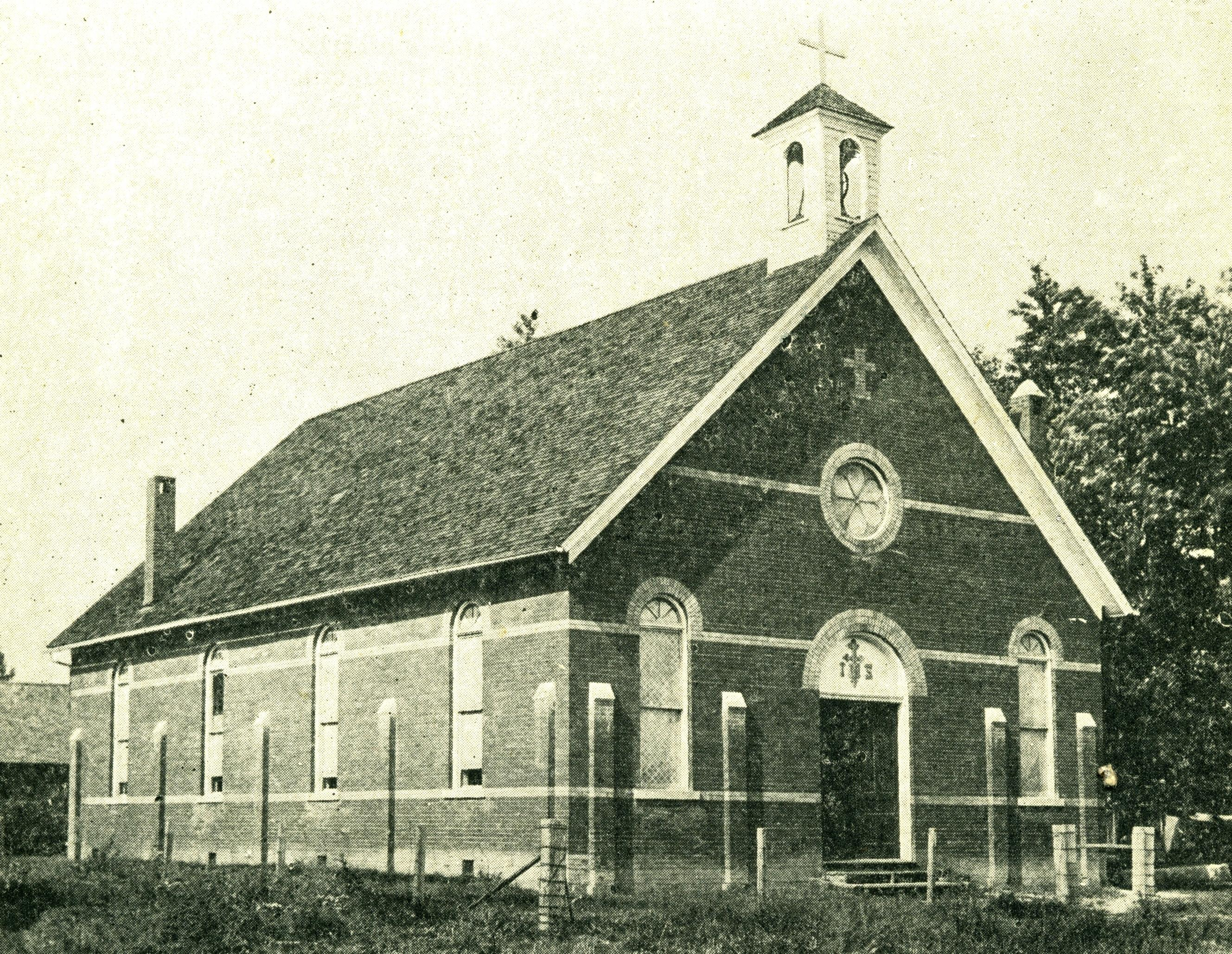

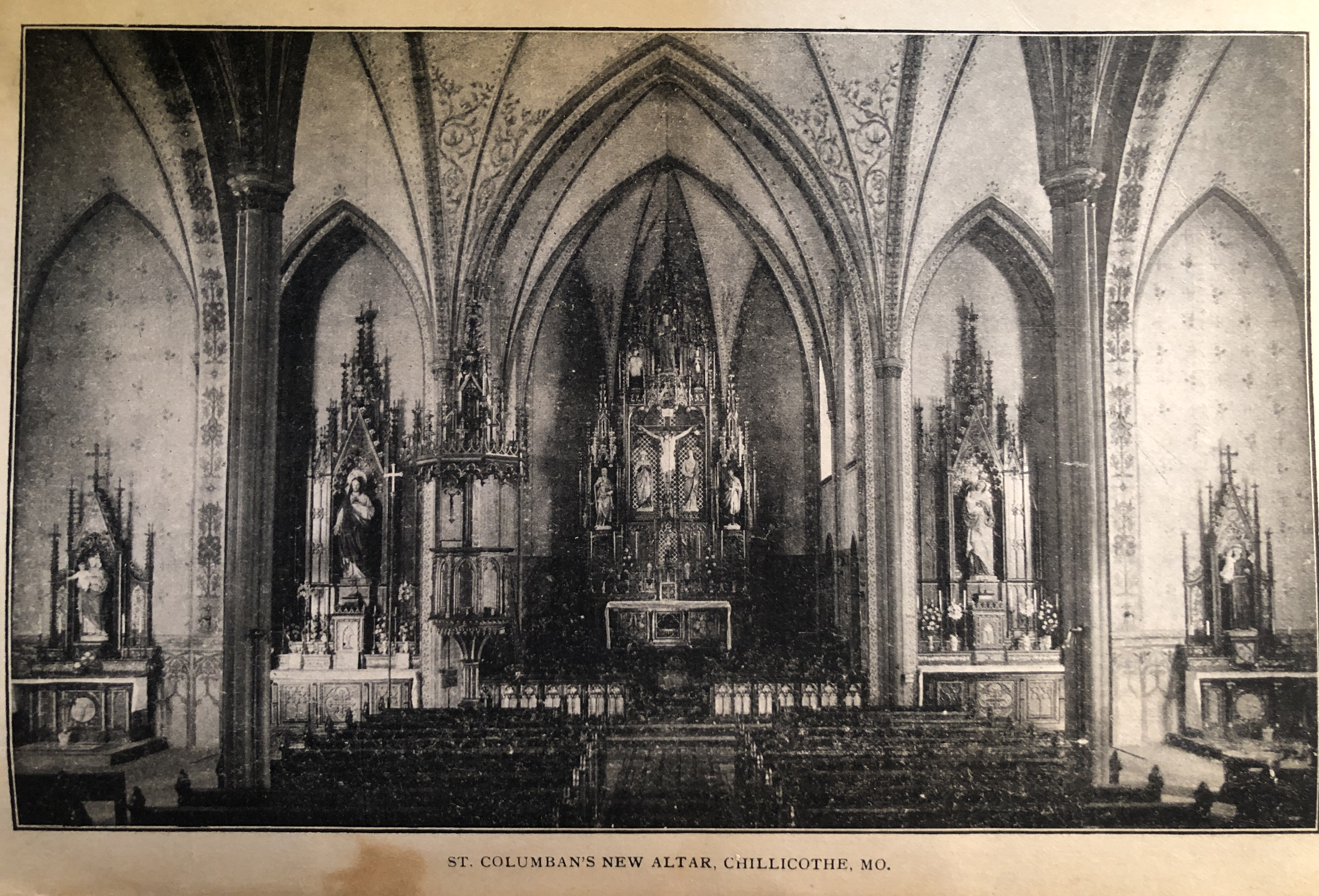
Church in 1904 after new altar was added

In 1895 St. Joseph church (left) was built just south of the railroad tracks on the east side of the highway, and the parish was divided at Jackson Street. St. Joseph closed in 1956, to the dismay of some in its close-knit community.

A census taken in 1904 counted 42 German families, mostly farmers, 56 Irish families, mostly railroad workers, and 8 French families. In 1904 a new, white-oak main altar with ornate reredos was constructed, along with an additional two side altars of white walnut dedicated to Saint Joseph and Saint Anthony (right). The side altars of the Sacred Heart and the Blessed Mother were original to the church and also made of white walnut. By 1907 the parish census counted 738 people. The Catholic influence in the Chillicothe area was evidenced by the Franciscan's Historical Sketches of the parish (1905), which contained over 100 advertisements of one-quarter page or more.

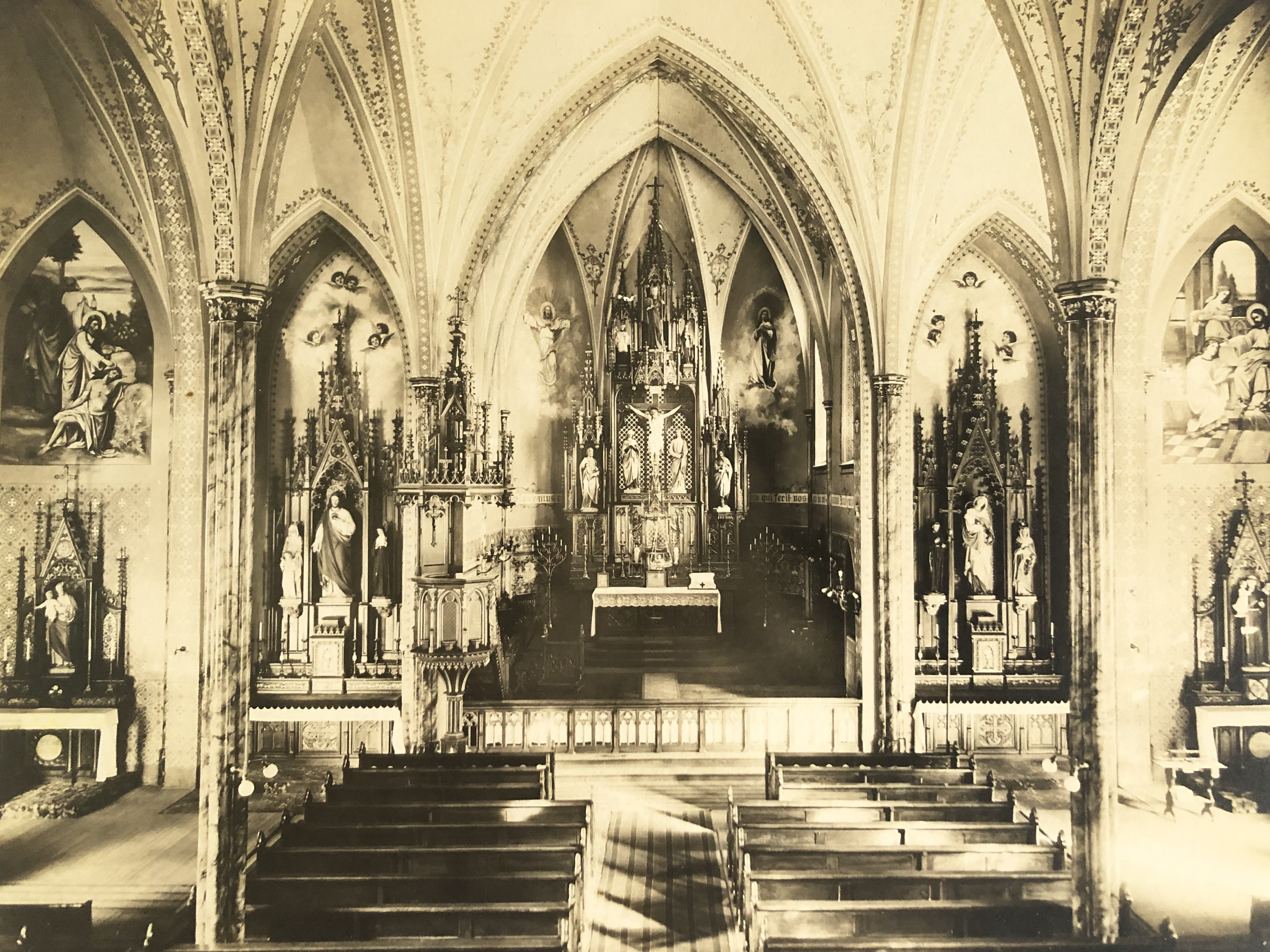
Interior circa 1914

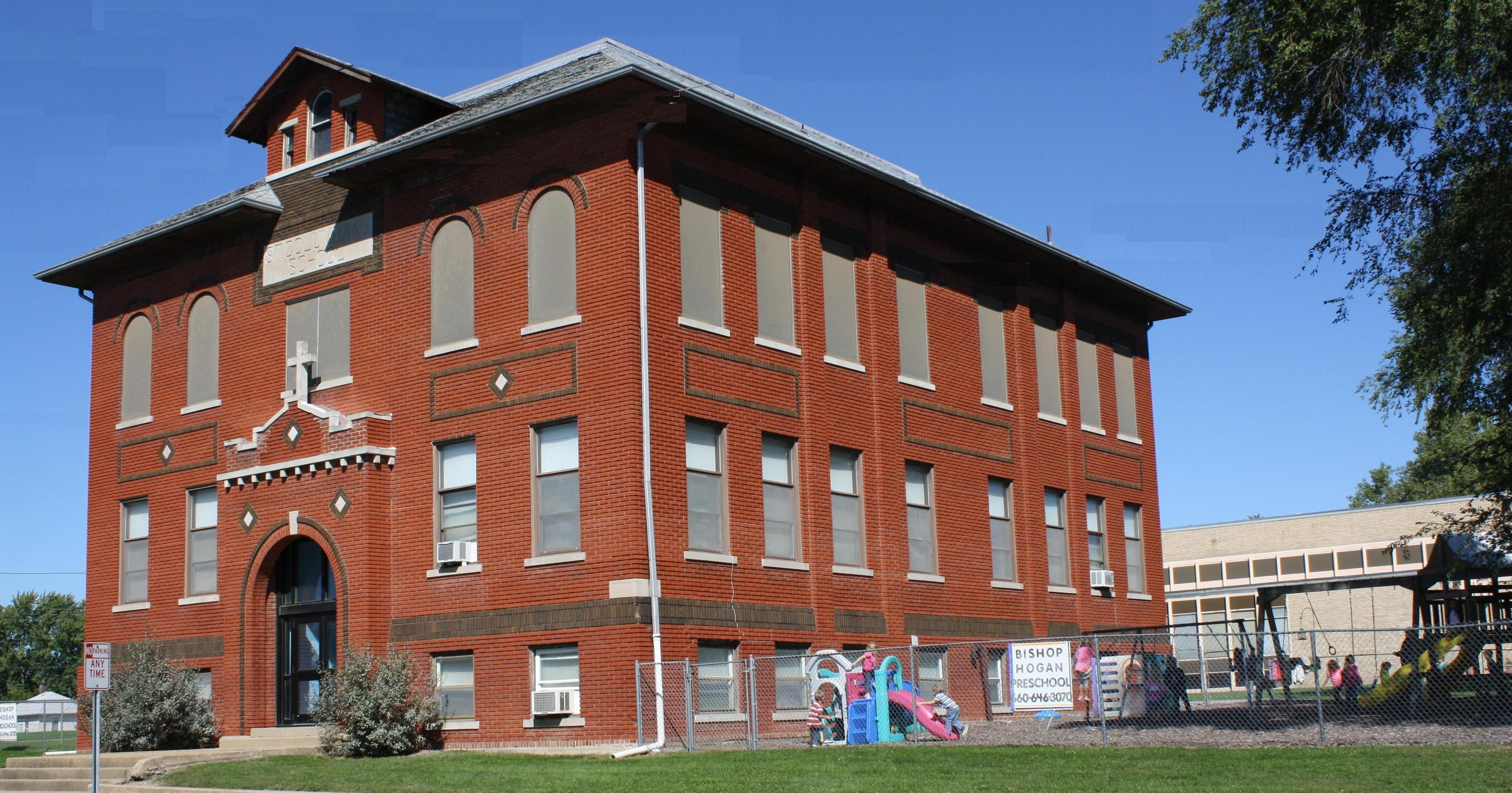

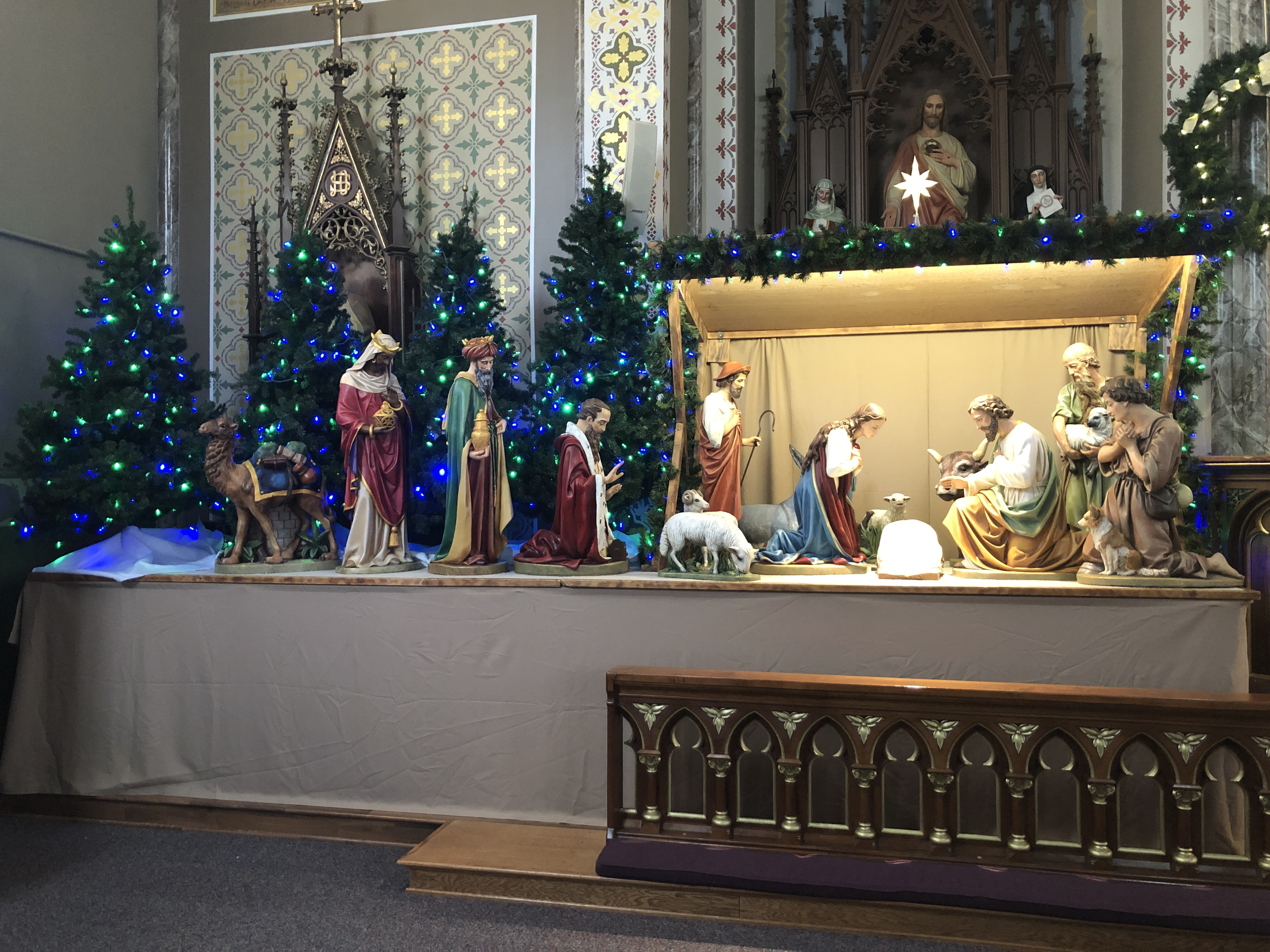
St. Columban Nativity Scene

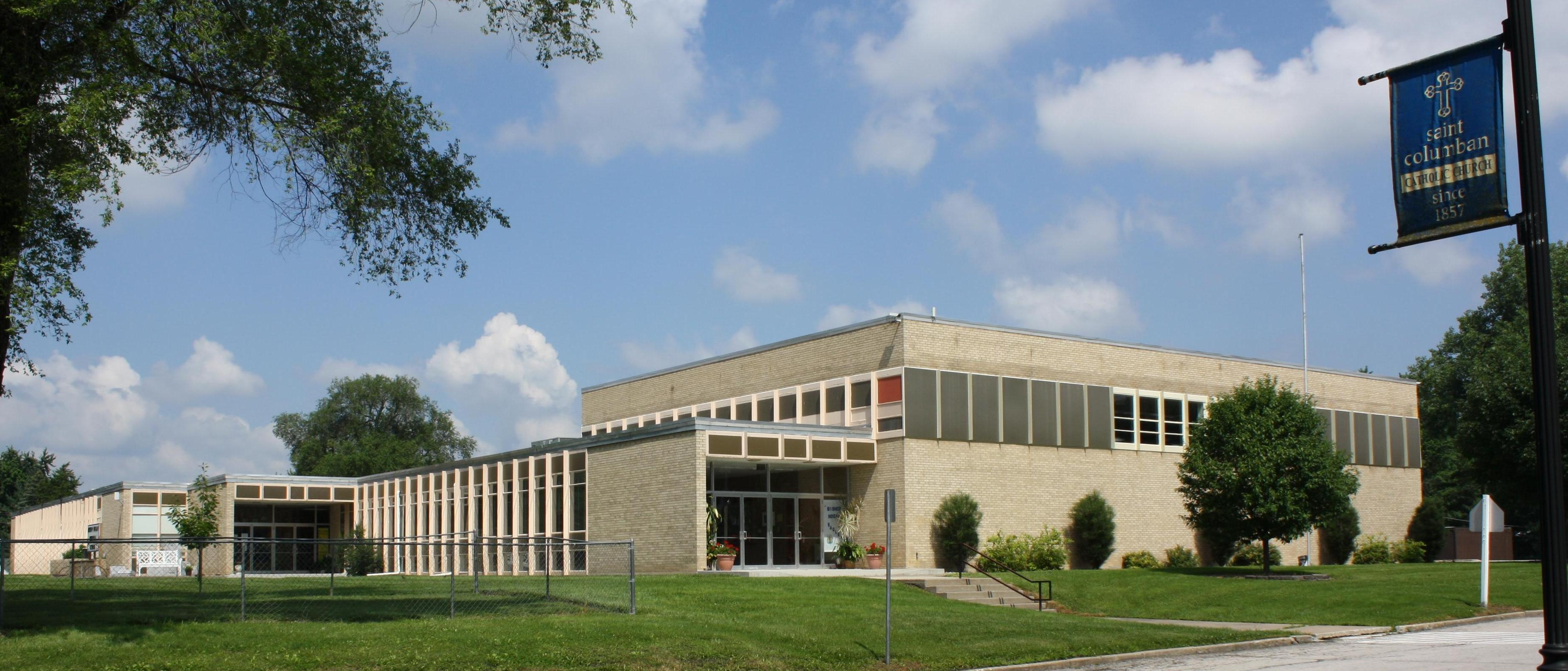

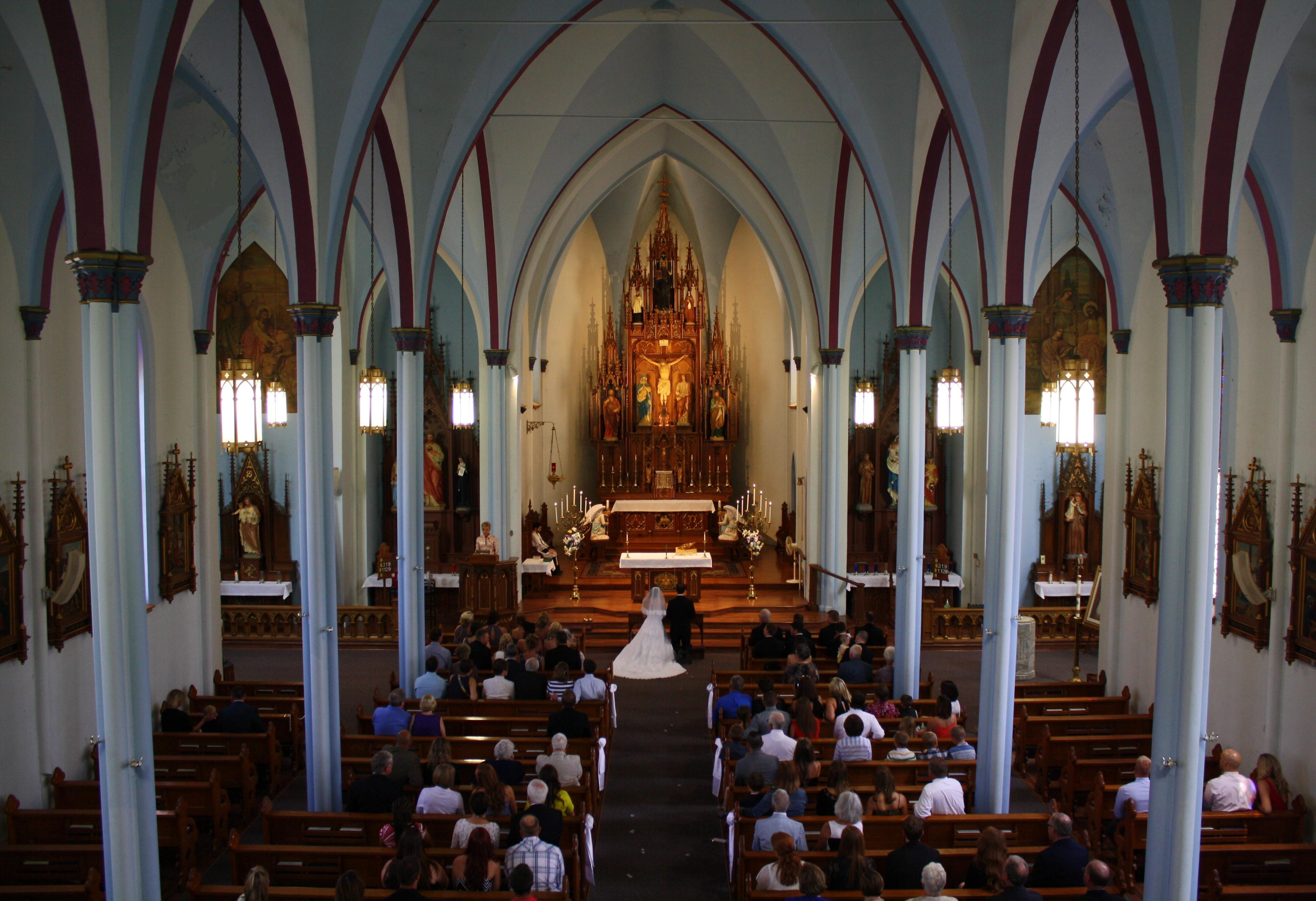
interior prior to 2017 restoration

In 1910, a German-crafted nativity scene set with near life-size figures was purchased, and after a century is still in use. In 1913 Thomas Bush painted a mural above each outer side altar: Jesus Healing and Jesus at the home of Martha and Mary. Additionally, murals of the Ascension and Assumption were painted on both sides of the main altar. In 1913 St. Columban elementary school was built (to the right), and currently serves as classrooms for pre-school, kindergarten, first grade, music, and middle school science. In July 1914, the Franciscans left the parish and diocesan priests managed the parish until 1971 when Benedictine monks from Conception Abbey took charge. In 1998 the Benedictines left and the parish reverted to the diocese.

In 1957 the St. Joseph Academy building was razed to make way for Bishop Hogan Elementary School (left), which currently enrolls around 140 students in preschool through 8th grade. The academy moved to the St. Columban School building and continued until 1969, when the building was converted for pre-school and elementary use.

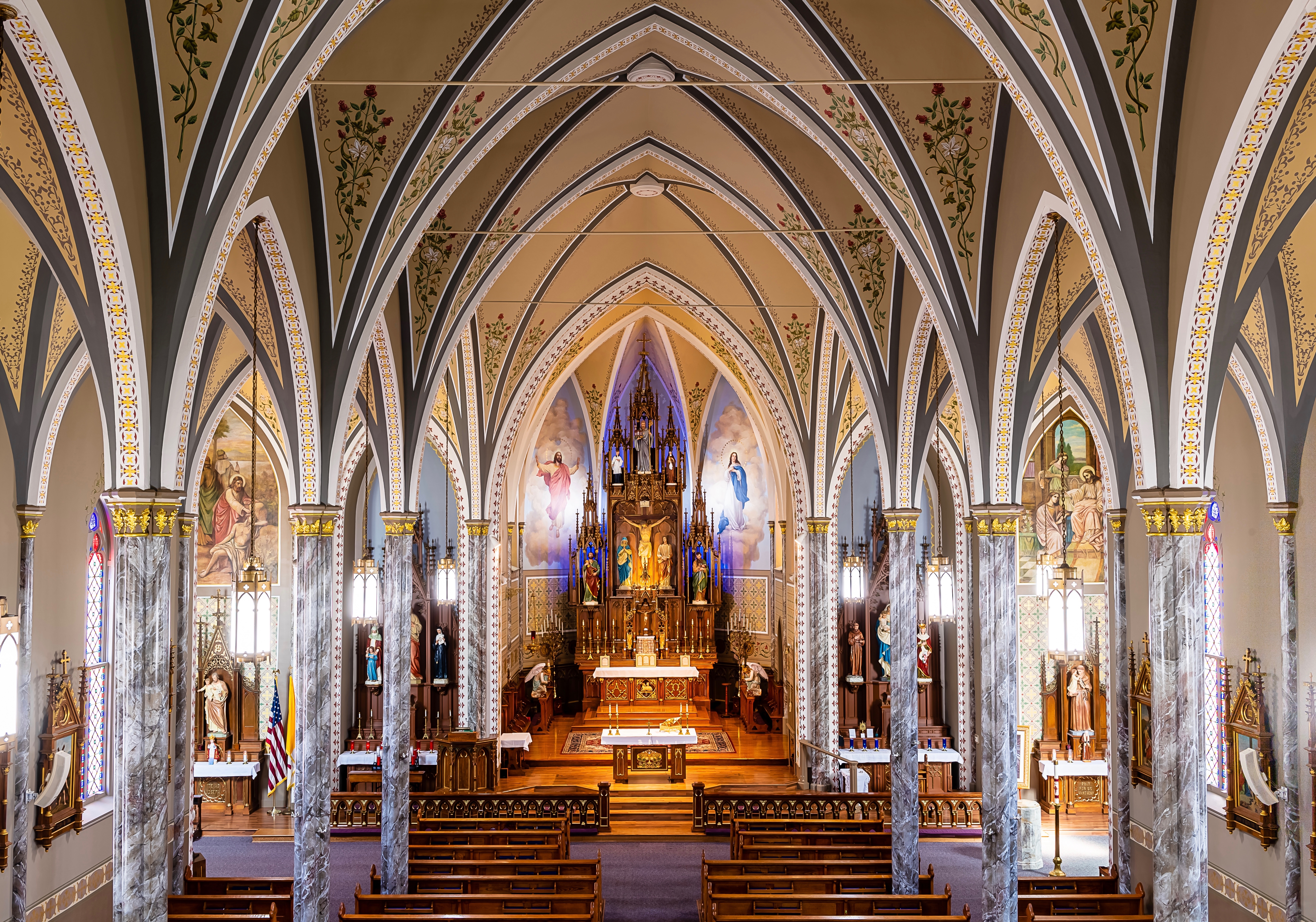
The restored interior circa 2019

The church building has a shrine-like atmosphere with 32 statues, 4 murals, 2 paintings, beautiful stained-glass windows, and stations of the cross. An additional 10 statues are located in a small park/shrine to Mary to the south of the church. In 2015 the parish counted 460 families.

In 2017, the interior of the church was restored back to what it looked like at its artistic height in 1914 (see before (left) and after (right)). The first mass celebrated in the newly restored church was held on August 6, 2017.

In 2018, the communion rail was restored and put back in place.

The interior of the rectory was restored in 2021.

== Gallery ==
Former Missions of St. Columban
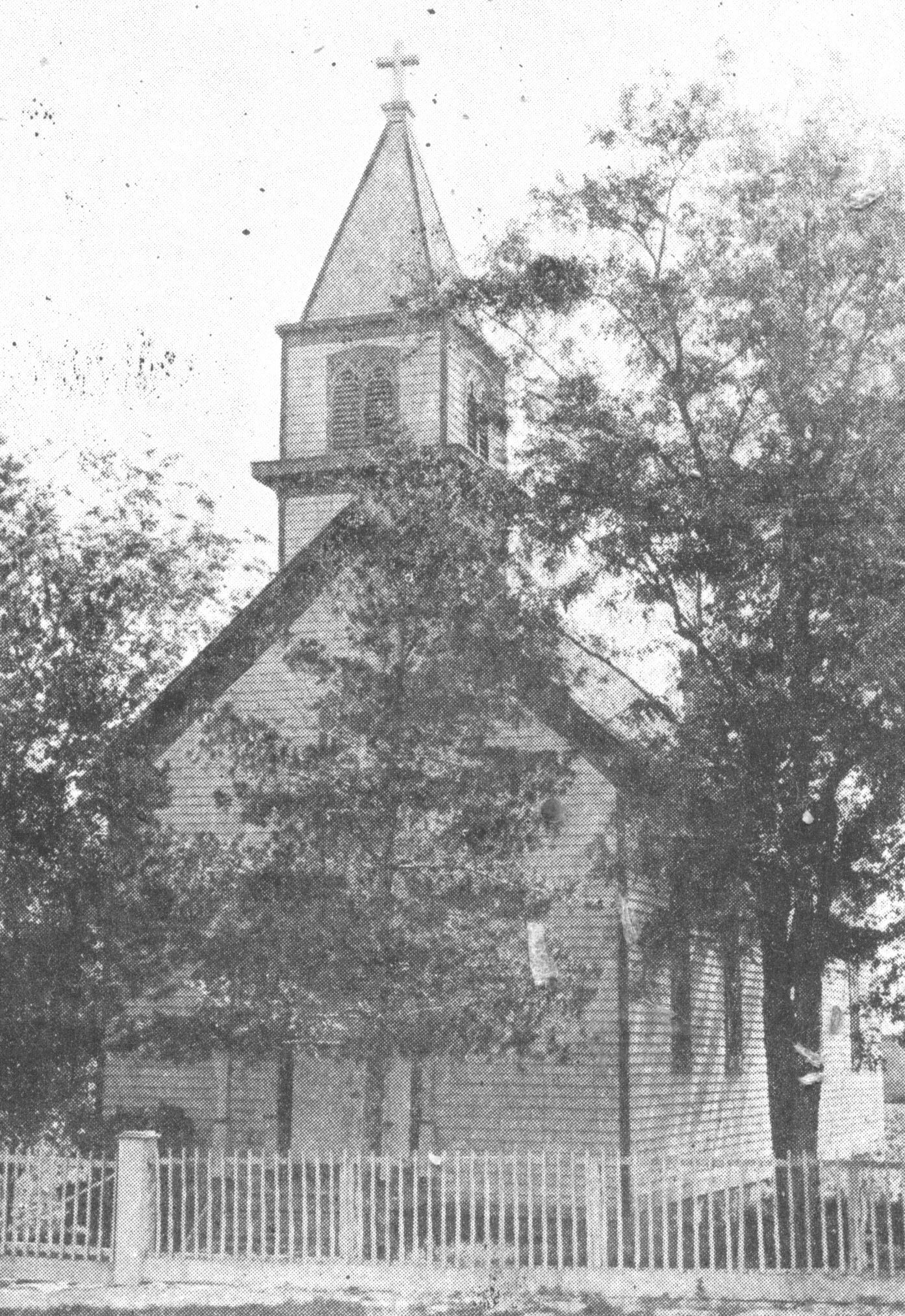
Saint Joseph, Utica, 1877

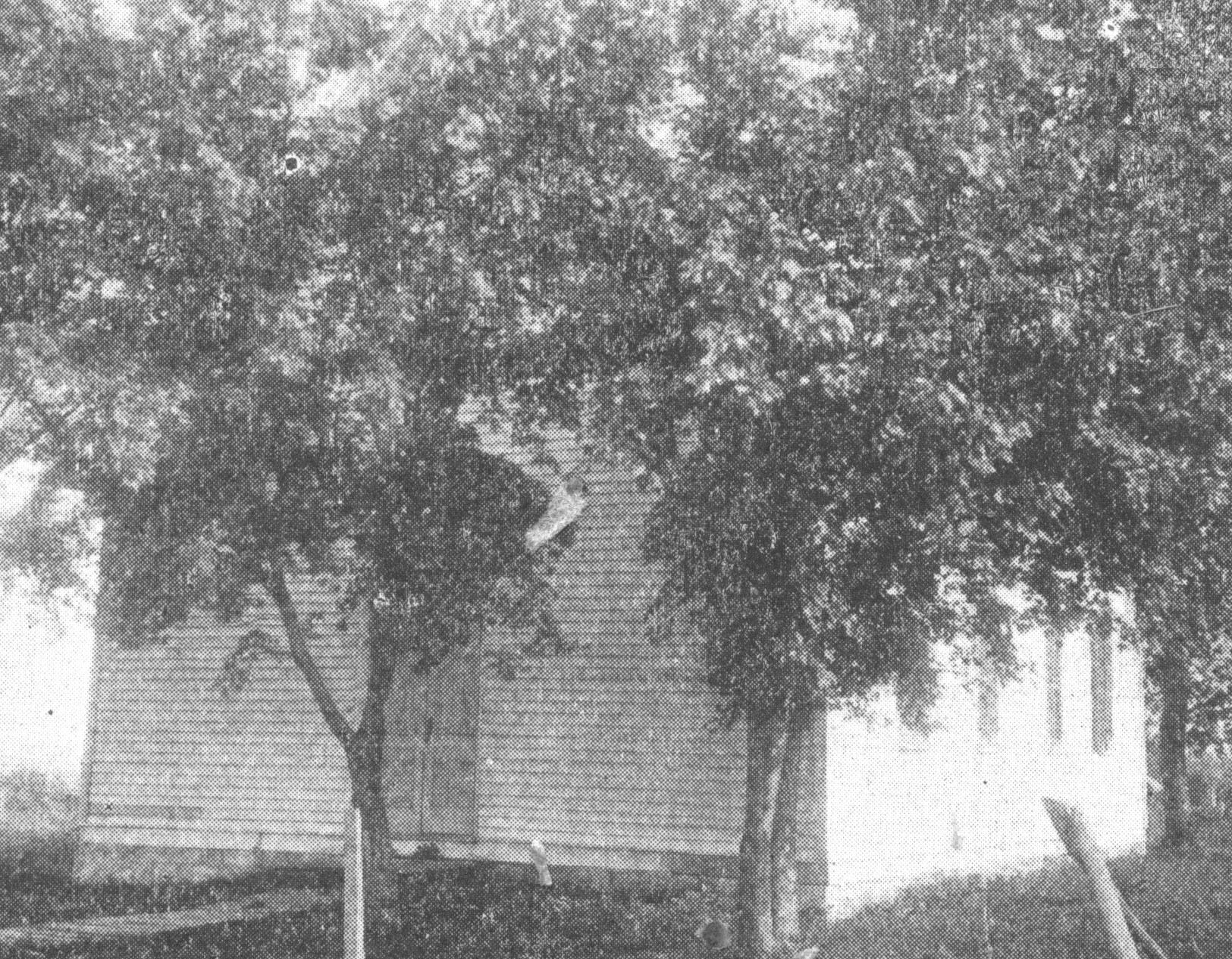
St. John, Breckenridge, 1878

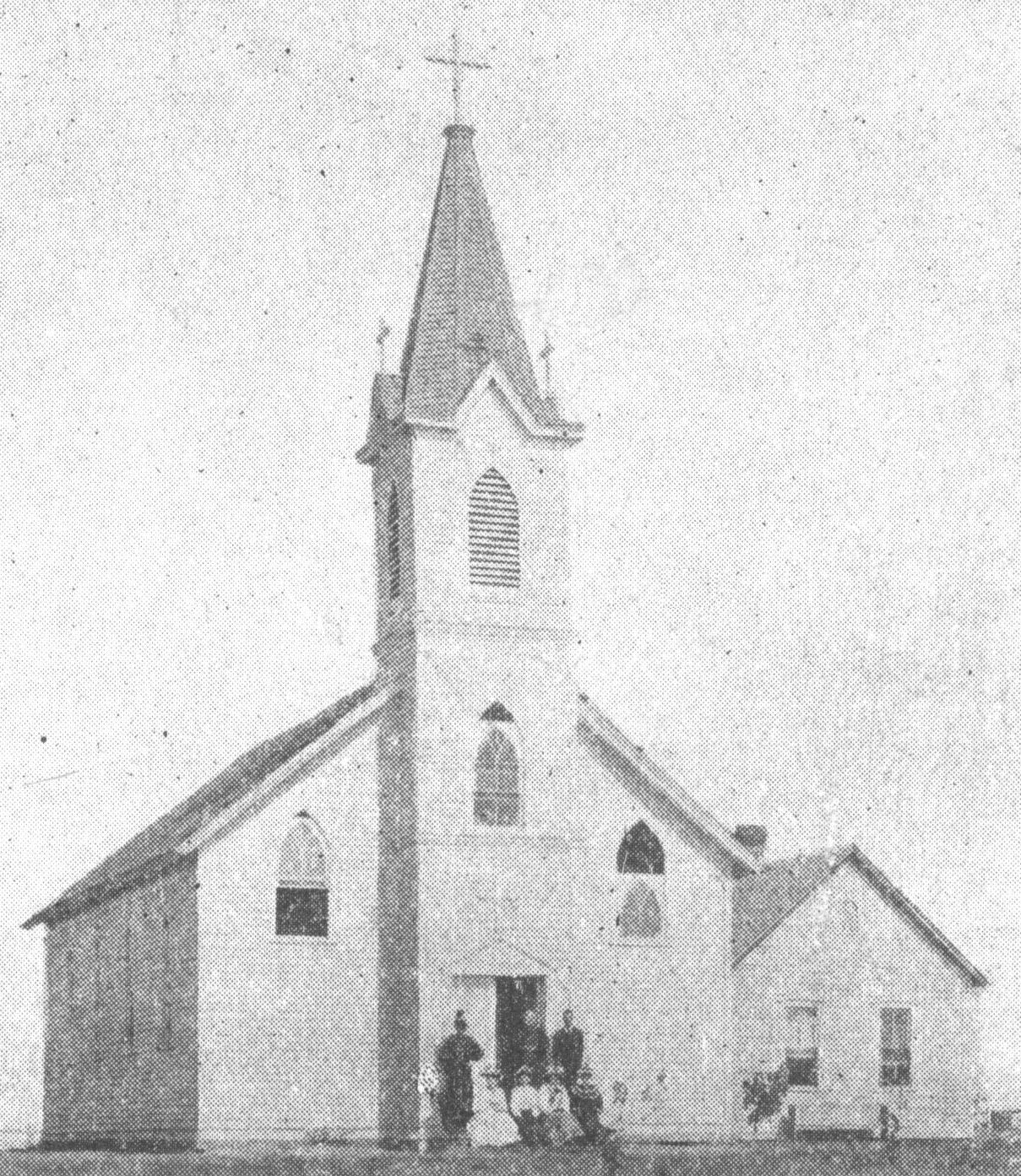
St. Patrick, Leopolis, 1884

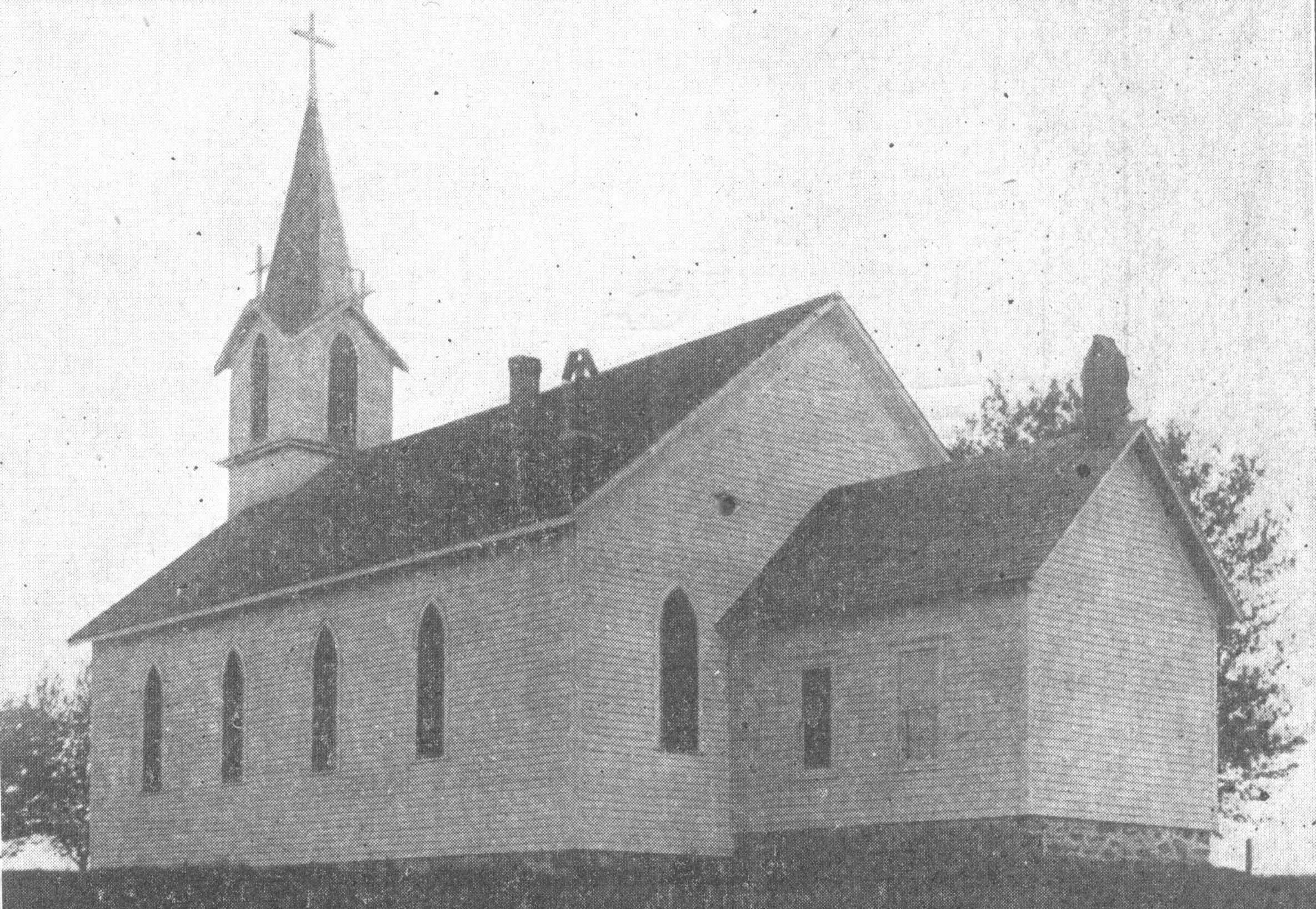
St. Raphael, Indian Grove, 1886

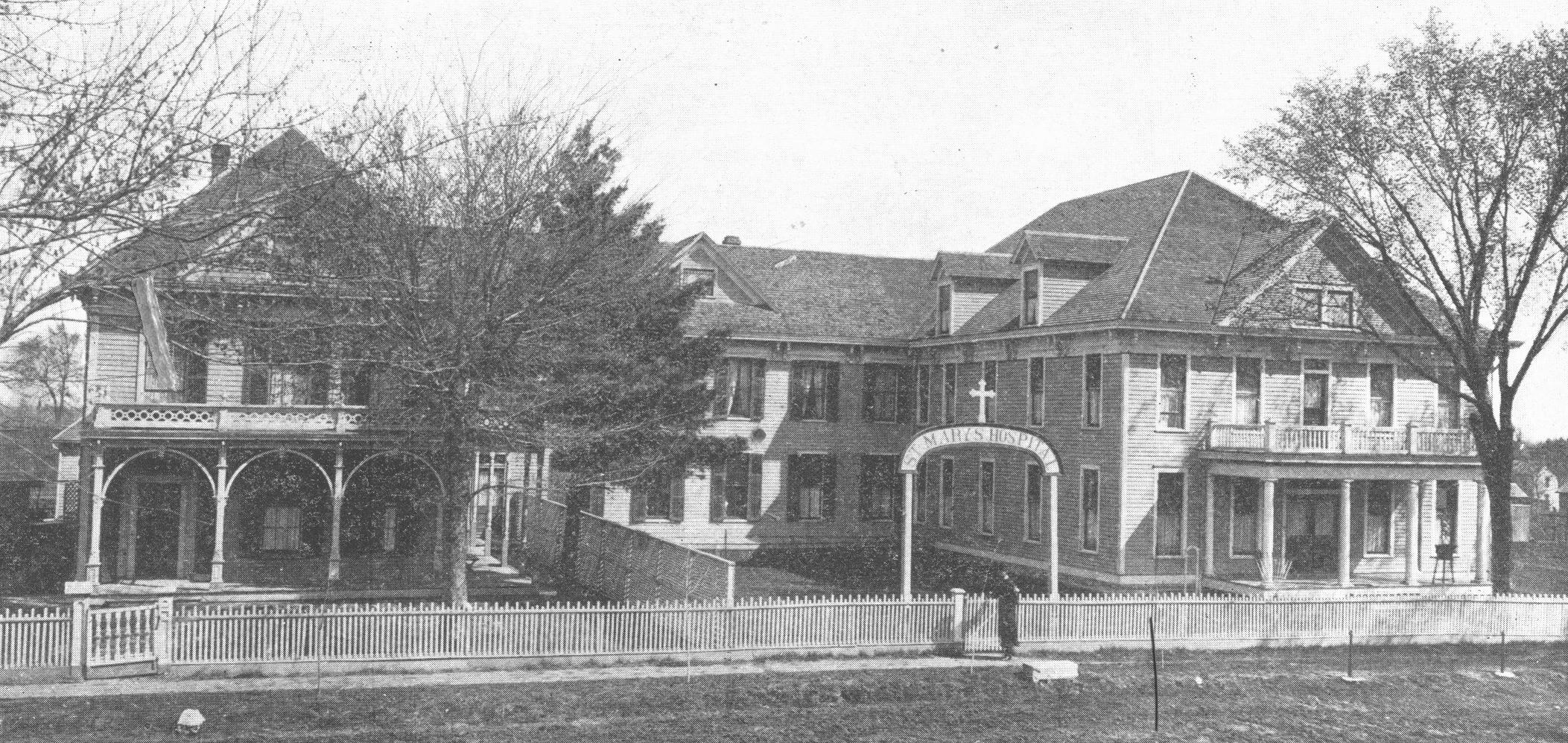
St. Mary's Hosp., Chillicothe, 1888

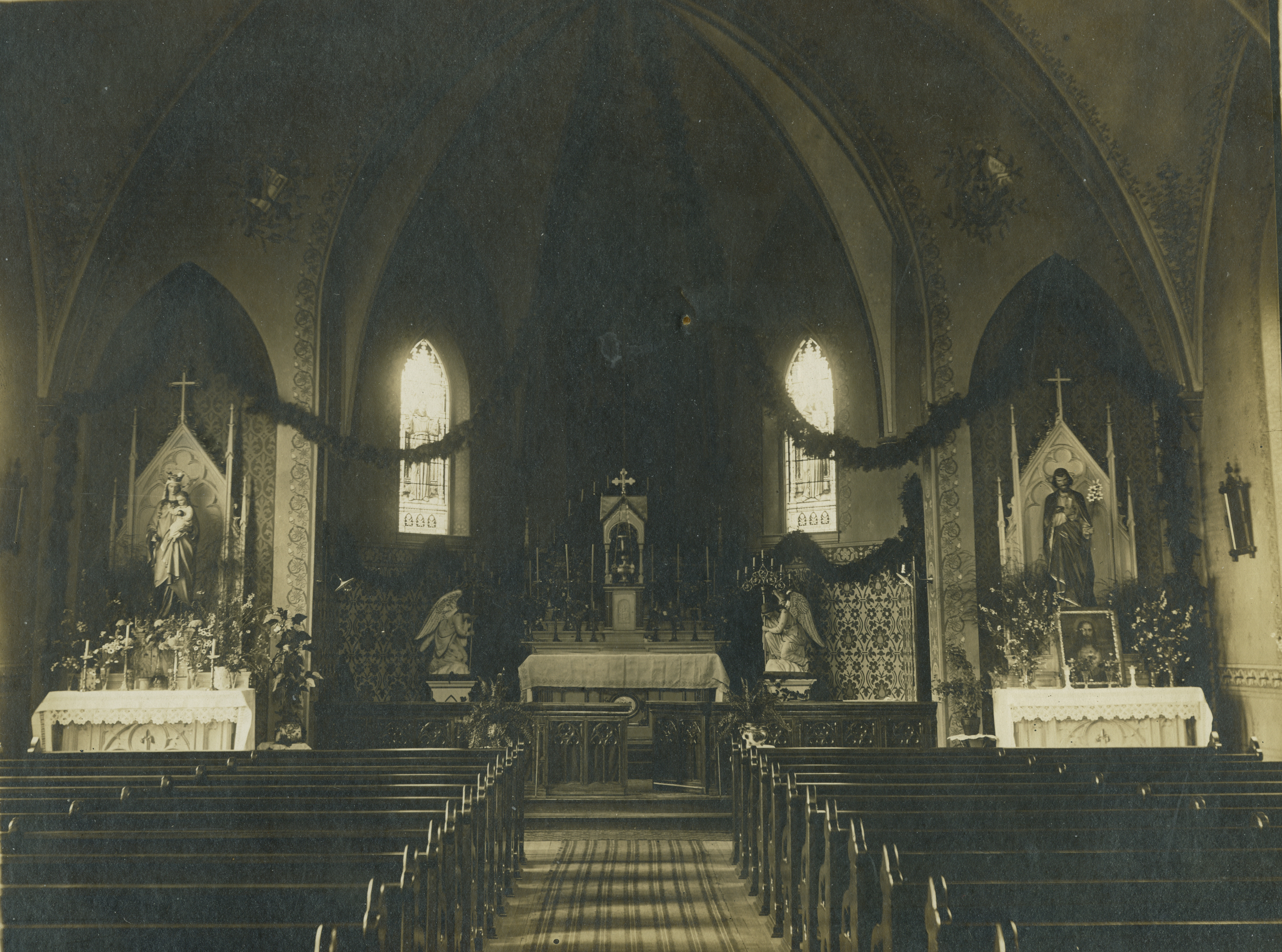
St. Joseph, Chillicothe, 1895

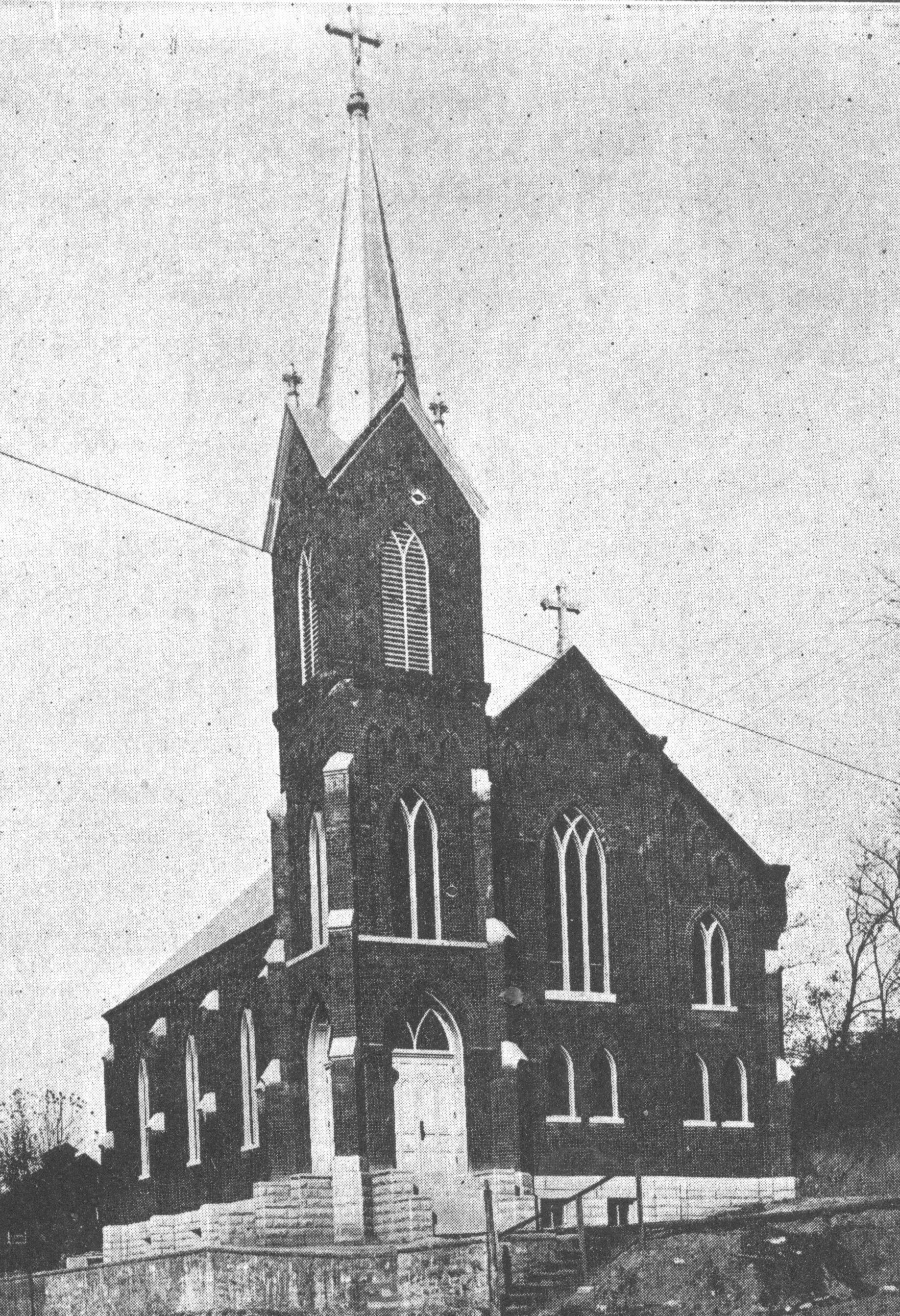
St. Boniface, Brunswick,1902
