= KULH =

Christian talk radio station in Missouri

- Wheeling, Missouri; United States
- Broadcast area: Brookfield, Missouri; Chillicothe, Missouri
- Frequency: 105.9 MHz
- Branding: The Wave

Programming
- Format: Christian radio

Ownership
- Owner: Resources Management Unlimited, Inc.

Technical information
- Licensing authority: FCC
- Facility ID: 84290
- Class: A
- ERP: 6,000 watts
- HAAT: 100 meters (330 ft)
- Transmitter coordinates: 39°54′25″N 93°20′30″W

Links
- Public license information: Public file; LMS
- Website: 1059thewave.com

KULH is a radio station airing a format consisting of Christian contemporary music and Christian talk and teaching, licensed to Wheeling, Missouri, broadcasting on 105.9 FM. The station serves the areas of Brookfield, Missouri and Chillicothe, Missouri, and is owned by Resources Management Unlimited, Inc.
