= Harsewinkel =

- Town
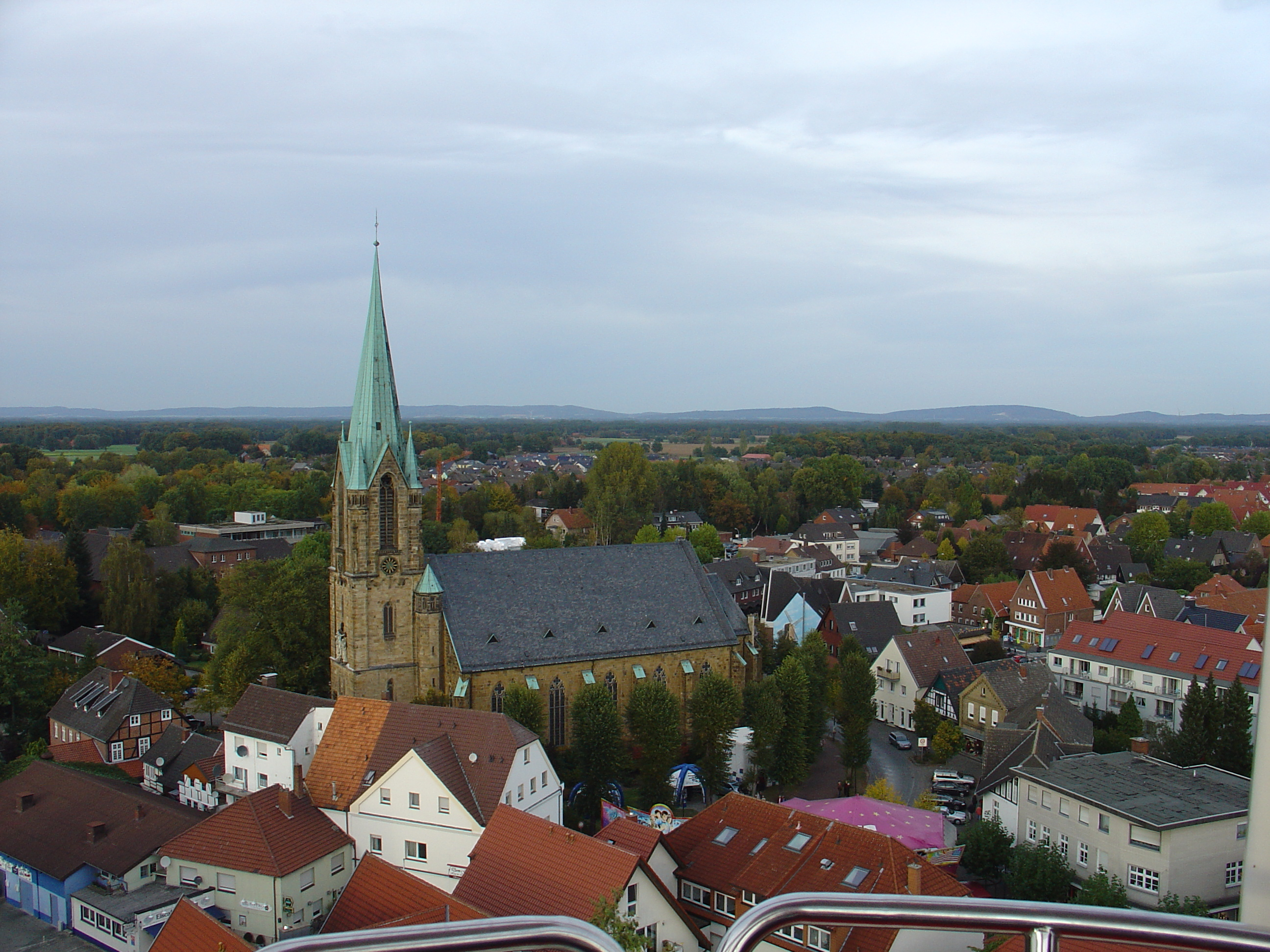
- St. Lucia Catholic Church in Harsewinkel

- Flag Coat of arms

- Location of Harsewinkel within Gütersloh district
- Interactive map of Harsewinkel
- Location within Germany Location within North Rhine-Westphalia
- Coordinates: 51°58′00″N 08°13′59″E
- Country: Germany
- State: North Rhine-Westphalia
- Admin. region: Detmold
- District: Gütersloh
- Subdivisions: 3

Government
  - Mayor (2020–25): Sabine Amsbeck-Dopheide (SPD)

Area
  - Total: 100.59 km^{2} (38.84 sq mi)
- Elevation: 56–79 m (184–259 ft)

Population (2025-12-31)
  - Total: 25,480
  - Density: 253.3/km^{2} (656.1/sq mi)
- Time zone: UTC+01:00 (CET)
  - Summer (DST): UTC+02:00 (CEST)
- Postal codes: 33428
- Dialling codes: 05247
- Vehicle registration: GT
- Website: www.harsewinkel.de

Harsewinkel (German pronunciation: [ˈhaʁzəˌvɪŋkl̩]) is a town in Gütersloh District in the state of North Rhine-Westphalia, Germany. It lies on the river Ems, some 15 km north-west of Gütersloh.

It is the home and domicile of Europe's leading combine harvester manufacturer CLAAS, which is a major employer in the town.

== History ==
Archaeological evidence indicates that the Harsewinkel area has been inhabited since the Bronze Age. The name "Hasuinkla" first appeared circa 1090 in records from the Freckenhorst Abbey and is believed to derive from the Old Saxon words haso (hare) or hros (horse). The Cistercian monastery of Marienfeld was founded in 1185 by Bishop Hermann II of Münster and several Westphalian nobles, and consecrated in 1222. Over time, the monastery acquired most local farms and exercised significant influence in local affairs, including judicial authority. Harsewinkel was plundered several times during the late Middle Ages, notably by Bernhard VII of Lippe during the Münster Diocesan Feud (1450–1457). The town suffered further hardship from wars, fires, and epidemics in subsequent centuries. In 1771, Abbot Arnoldus Detten released Harsewinkel from monastic serfdom, and in 1803 the town was granted city rights under Prussian rule. The 19th century brought infrastructural development, including paved roads (1883) and railway access (1900), which paved the way for industrialization beginning in 1919 with the founding of the Claas agricultural machinery company.

By 1931, local NSDAP groups had formed, and after 1933 municipal officials were replaced with party loyalists. Forced-labor camps housed up to 340 prisoners, primarily Poles and later French workers. Two Jewish families lived in Harsewinkel; one emigrated to Australia in 1939, and the other was deported and murdered in the Kaiserwald concentration camp in 1941. United States troops occupied the town on 2 April 1945. After the war, Harsewinkel expanded rapidly, merging with Greffen and Marienfeld in 1973. In 2008, 54.2% of residents were Catholic and 18.3% Protestant; by 2025 these figures had declined to 35% and 13% respectively. The postwar decades were marked by industrial expansion, infrastructure projects, and housing development for returning soldiers and immigrants, and the town remains an administrative and economic center today.

== Population ==
Historical population

Year	Pop.	±% p.a.
1965	13,430	—
1970	15,859	+3.38%
1975	17,585	+2.09%
1980	18,394	+0.90%
1985	18,727	+0.36%
1990	20,135	+1.46%
1995	22,616	+2.35%

Year	Pop.	±% p.a.
2000	23,639	+0.89%
2005	24,251	+0.51%
2010	24,072	−0.15%
2015	24,769	+0.57%
2020	25,338	+0.46%
2025	25,480	+0.11%

Source: Landesdatabank Nordrhein-Westfalen

== Notable people ==
- Josef Homeyer (1929–2010), Roman Catholic bishop
- Adrian Wewer, Church architect in the United States
- Johann Christoph Rincklake, painter
