= KCHI (AM) =

- Chillicothe, Missouri; United States
- Frequency: 1010 kHz

Programming
- Format: Adult contemporary (KCHI-FM simulcast)
- Affiliations: Fox News Radio

Ownership
- Owner: Leatherman Communications
- Sister stations: KCHI-FM

History
- First air date: March 3, 1950
- Call sign meaning: Chillicothe

Technical information
- Licensing authority: FCC
- Facility ID: 63377
- Class: D
- Power: 250 watts day 37 watts night
- Transmitter coordinates: 39°45′51″N 93°33′21″W

Links
- Public license information: Public file; LMS
- Website: kchi.com

KCHI (1010 kHz) is an AM radio station broadcasting an adult contemporary music format. Licensed to Chillicothe, Missouri, United States. The station is currently owned by Leatherman Communications.

== History ==
On May 9, 2007, the station was sold to Leatherman Communications.

== Previous logo ==
(Former logo under previous KCHI-FM 98.5 frequency)
