= Chillicothe, Missouri =

- City
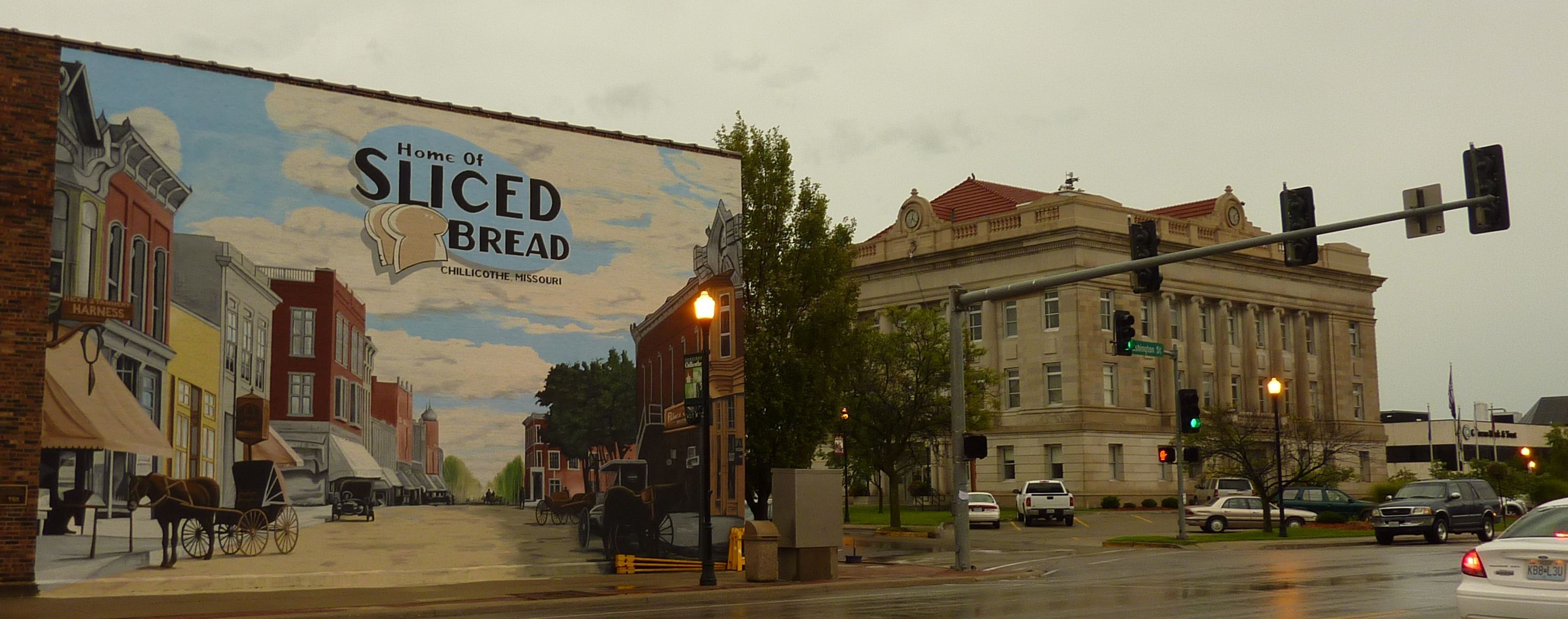
- Livingston County Courthouse with mural depicting the community being the home of sliced bread. The district around the courthouse is on the National Register of Historic Places.
- Nicknames: Chilli; Home of Sliced Bread; The Highway City
- Location of Chillicothe, Missouri
- Coordinates: 39°47′43″N 93°32′59″W
- Country: United States
- State: Missouri
- County: Livingston
- Town (Large): March 1st, 1855

Government
  - Type: Township
  - Mayor: Theresa Kelly

Area
  - Total: 7.16 sq mi (18.54 km^{2})
  - Land: 7.14 sq mi (18.48 km^{2})
  - Water: 0.027 sq mi (0.07 km^{2})
- Elevation: 774 ft (236 m)

Population (2020)
  - Total: 9,107
  - Density: 1,276.7/sq mi (492.93/km^{2})
- Time zone: UTC-6 (Central (CST))
  - Summer (DST): UTC-5 (CDT)
- ZIP code: 64601
- Area code: 660
- FIPS code: 29-13690
- GNIS feature ID: 2393517
- Website: www.chillicothecity.org

Chillicothe (/ˌtʃɪlɪˈkɒθi/ chil-ih-KOTH-ee) is a city in and the county seat of Livingston County, Missouri, United States. The population was 9,107 at the 2020 census. The name Chillicothe is Shawnee for 'big town'. Chillicothe is known as "The Home of Sliced Bread". For many years its schools were segregated and African American students attended what eventually became known as Garrison School, named after William Lloyd Garrison.

== History of Chillicothe and Livingston County ==
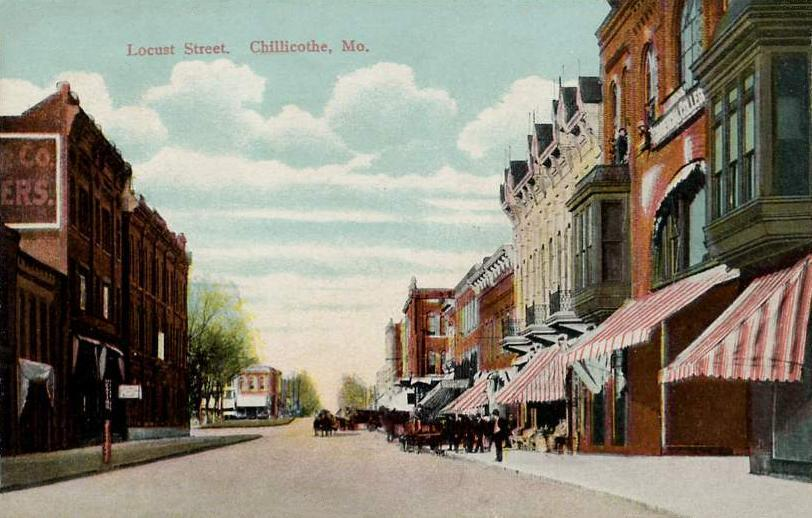
Locust Street in c. 1908

This territory was originally settled by indigenous peoples of the Americas. The Osage and Missouri were in the territory at the time of earliest European contact, which was mostly by French explorers and traders. By 1800 the Shawnee and Iowa had migrated here. The Shawnee came from the Ohio Country, where they had been under pressure before the American Revolution from aggressive Iroquois and later encroaching European Americans. Displacing the Osage, the Shawnee had a major village known as Chillicothe about a mile from the present-day city, named after their historic capital in their traditional lands in Ohio. Chillicothe was also the name of a major band of the tribe. Other Native American tribes in the area were the Sauk and Meskwaki, and Potawatomi, all of whom hunted in the area.

In the early 19th century, European-American migration to Missouri increased. The original survey of Chillicothe by United States citizens was filed for record August 31, 1837, and a resurvey of the same was filed August 5, 1859. Chillicothe was incorporated as a city by an act of the General Assembly, approved March 1, 1855. It was selected as the County seat by commissioners and the first term of the county court began on May 7, 1838. In August of that year an order was made to erect the first Court House, the cost not to exceed $5,000, in the Public Square; The first circuit court for the trial of civil and criminal causes was held on the 3d of July 1887.

Livingston was settled by emigrants from the older counties and others from the Upper South states of Kentucky and Tennessee, as well as Ohio and other "Old Northwest" states, as the westward migration continued. Prior to completion of the Hannibal & St. Joseph Railroad in 1859, the city was minimally developed with cheap frame houses, with little pretense of architectural beauty or design. The building materials being hewed and sawed from the oak and walnut timber surrounding the town, as timber originally covered the site.

The railroad gave an impetus for town improvements. Soon two and three-story brick business buildings were constructed in place of the former frame structures. From 1865 to 1870, the city improved rapidly, then a lull lasted until 1875, when the erection of the beautiful three-story, $36,000 school building was started, now known as "Middle School." From that time on Chillicothe made a slow, steady growth up to 1886, when the Chicago, Milwaukee & St. Paul Railroad was built through here. That year also saw the introduction of the "Water Works" and electric lights. The city continued to modernize in the early 20th century.

Chillicothe was located along the first railroad completed across the State of Missouri on February 13, 1859, by the Hannibal and St. Joseph Railroad, later becoming the Chicago, Burlington and Quincy Railroad. The Wabash Railroad completed a line to Brunswick, Missouri in 1871. Passenger rail served the town for over a century. The last passenger train passed through Chillicothe in 1971, when the American Royal Zephyr between Chicago and Kansas City was discontinued. The tracks eastward toward Brookfield were abandoned in the early 1980s and have been mostly removed. The 1909 Depot was owned by the City of Chillicothe until 2016, when it was sold to Wabash BBQ to be used as a restaurant. The restaurant has since closed.

=== Missouri Training School for Girls ===
The Missouri Training School for Girls (1889–1981) was the correctional facility of the Missouri Division of Youth Services. It opened in 1889. In 1956, the school received all of the black girls after the Missouri Training School for Negro Girls in Tipton closed. The school closed in 1981.

== Geography ==
Chillicothe is located in central Livingston County. The Grand River flows past approximately one mile south of the city and the confluence of the Thompson River with the Grand is about three miles to the southwest. The city is served by U.S. Route 36, U.S. Route 65 and Missouri Route 190.

According to the United States Census Bureau, the city has a total area of 7.03 square miles (18.21 km^{2}), of which 7.02 square miles (18.18 km^{2}) is land and 0.01 square miles (0.03 km^{2}) is water.

=== Climate ===
Climate data for Chillicothe 2S, Missouri (1991–2020 normals, extremes 1980–present)
Month	Jan	Feb	Mar	Apr	May	Jun	Jul	Aug	Sep	Oct	Nov	Dec	Year
Record high °F (°C)	74 (23)	77 (25)	86 (30)	93 (34)	98 (37)	108 (42)	110 (43)	109 (43)	100 (38)	95 (35)	81 (27)	75 (24)	110 (43)
Mean maximum °F (°C)	59.0 (15.0)	65.3 (18.5)	77.3 (25.2)	84.1 (28.9)	89.6 (32.0)	94.4 (34.7)	98.2 (36.8)	97.7 (36.5)	92.1 (33.4)	85.7 (29.8)	73.7 (23.2)	62.9 (17.2)	99.9 (37.7)
Mean daily maximum °F (°C)	34.5 (1.4)	39.8 (4.3)	52.0 (11.1)	63.5 (17.5)	73.5 (23.1)	83.1 (28.4)	87.3 (30.7)	85.7 (29.8)	78.3 (25.7)	66.1 (18.9)	51.4 (10.8)	39.2 (4.0)	62.9 (17.1)
Daily mean °F (°C)	25.4 (−3.7)	30.2 (−1.0)	41.4 (5.2)	52.4 (11.3)	63.3 (17.4)	73.1 (22.8)	77.2 (25.1)	75.1 (23.9)	66.7 (19.3)	54.5 (12.5)	41.3 (5.2)	30.5 (−0.8)	52.6 (11.4)
Mean daily minimum °F (°C)	16.3 (−8.7)	20.6 (−6.3)	30.8 (−0.7)	41.4 (5.2)	53.2 (11.8)	63.1 (17.3)	67.1 (19.5)	64.4 (18.0)	55.1 (12.8)	42.8 (6.0)	31.2 (−0.4)	21.7 (−5.7)	42.3 (5.7)
Mean minimum °F (°C)	−3.1 (−19.5)	2.0 (−16.7)	12.0 (−11.1)	27.7 (−2.4)	39.3 (4.1)	51.1 (10.6)	57.4 (14.1)	54.9 (12.7)	40.6 (4.8)	28.2 (−2.1)	16.1 (−8.8)	2.9 (−16.2)	−7.7 (−22.1)
Record low °F (°C)	−20 (−29)	−17 (−27)	−6 (−21)	11 (−12)	31 (−1)	44 (7)	50 (10)	41 (5)	30 (−1)	19 (−7)	−9 (−23)	−26 (−32)	−26 (−32)
Average precipitation inches (mm)	1.26 (32)	1.80 (46)	2.90 (74)	3.75 (95)	5.36 (136)	5.21 (132)	4.71 (120)	4.61 (117)	4.39 (112)	3.22 (82)	2.29 (58)	1.69 (43)	41.19 (1,047)
Average snowfall inches (cm)	4.7 (12)	4.5 (11)	1.6 (4.1)	0.3 (0.76)	0.0 (0.0)	0.0 (0.0)	0.0 (0.0)	0.0 (0.0)	0.0 (0.0)	0.0 (0.0)	0.4 (1.0)	2.4 (6.1)	13.9 (34.96)
Average precipitation days (≥ 0.01 in)	6.3	7.3	9.2	11.3	13.1	10.9	9.3	9.6	8.6	9.3	7.4	6.6	108.9
Average snowy days (≥ 0.1 in)	2.8	2.4	0.9	0.1	0.0	0.0	0.0	0.0	0.0	0.0	0.5	2.1	8.8
Source: NOAA

== Demographics ==
Historical population
Census	Pop.	Note	%±
1860	994		—
1870	3,978		300.2%
1880	4,078		2.5%
1890	5,717		40.2%
1900	6,905		20.8%
1910	6,265		−9.3%
1920	6,772		8.1%
1930	8,177		20.7%
1940	8,012		−2.0%
1950	8,694		8.5%
1960	9,236		6.2%
1970	9,519		3.1%
1980	9,089		−4.5%
1990	8,804		−3.1%
2000	8,968		1.9%
2010	9,515		6.1%
2020	9,107		−4.3%
U.S. Decennial Census

=== 2020 census ===
As of the 2020 census, Chillicothe had a population of 9,107 and 2,044 families. The median age was 39.7 years. 20.1% of residents were under the age of 18 and 20.1% of residents were 65 years of age or older. For every 100 females there were 69.5 males, and for every 100 females age 18 and over there were 62.0 males age 18 and over.

100.0% of residents lived in urban areas, while 0.0% lived in rural areas.

There were 3,377 households in Chillicothe, of which 27.8% had children under the age of 18 living in them. Of all households, 39.6% were married-couple households, 19.6% were households with a male householder and no spouse or partner present, and 33.0% were households with a female householder and no spouse or partner present. About 37.4% of all households were made up of individuals and 18.0% had someone living alone who was 65 years of age or older.

There were 3,904 housing units, of which 13.5% were vacant. The homeowner vacancy rate was 3.8% and the rental vacancy rate was 10.5%.

Racial composition as of the 2020 census
Race	Number	Percent
White	8,254	90.6%
Black or African American	308	3.4%
American Indian and Alaska Native	29	0.3%
Asian	76	0.8%
Native Hawaiian and Other Pacific Islander	1	0.0%
Some other race	50	0.5%
Two or more races	389	4.3%
Hispanic or Latino (of any race)	187	2.1%

=== Income and poverty ===
The 2016–2020 5-year American Community Survey estimates show that the median household income was $45,496 (with a margin of error of +/- $3,506) and the median family income was $56,488 (+/- $8,384). Males had a median income of $34,937 (+/- $3,959) versus $25,867 (+/- $3,033) for females. The median income for those above 16 years old was $30,715 (+/- $1,036). Approximately, 14.1% of families and 16.0% of the population were below the poverty line, including 18.5% of those under the age of 18 and 16.3% of those ages 65 or over.

=== 2010 census ===
As of the census of 2010, there were 9,515 people, 3,612 households, and 2,146 families living in the city. The population density was 1,355.4 inhabitants per square mile (523.3/km^{2}). There were 4,108 housing units at an average density of 585.2 per square mile (225.9/km^{2}). The racial makeup of the city was 93.5% White, 3.7% African American, 0.4% Native American, 0.3% Asian, 0.5% from other races, and 1.5% from two or more races. Hispanic or Latino of any race were 1.5% of the population.

There were 3,612 households, of which 29.7% had children under the age of 18 living with them, 42.6% were married couples living together, 12.7% had a female householder with no husband present, 4.1% had a male householder with no wife present, and 40.6% were non-families. 35.5% of all households were made up of individuals, and 17.2% had someone living alone who was 65 years of age or older. The average household size was 2.26 and the average family size was 2.90.

The median age in the city was 39.6 years. 21.4% of residents were under the age of 18; 8.3% were between the ages of 18 and 24; 27.3% were from 25 to 44; 24.3% were from 45 to 64; and 18.6% were 65 years of age or older. The gender makeup of the city was 41.3% male and 58.7% female.

=== 2000 census ===
As of the census of 2000, there were 8,968 people, 3,608 households, and 2,197 families living in the city. The population density was 1,370.9 inhabitants per square mile (529.3/km^{2}). There were 4,060 housing units at an average density of 620.7 per square mile (239.7/km^{2}). The racial makeup of the city was 93.86% White, 3.69% African American, 0.41% Native American, 0.40% Asian, 0.35% from other races, and 1.29% from two or more races. Hispanic or Latino of any race were 0.96% of the population.

There were 3,608 households, out of which 28.7% had children under the age of 18 living with them, 47.1% were married couples living together, 10.4% had a female householder with no husband present, and 39.1% were non-families. 35.9% of all households were made up of individuals, and 18.9% had someone living alone who was 65 years of age or older. school districts. The average household size was 2.24 and the average family size was 2.92.

In the city the population was spread out, with 23.2% under the age of 18, 7.7% from 18 to 24, 27.1% from 25 to 44, 20.9% from 45 to 64, and 21.1% who were 65 years of age or older. The median age was 40 years. For every 100 females, there were 75.9 males. For every 100 females age 18 and over, there were 68.4 males.

The median income for a household in the city was $30,053, and the median income for a family was $40,163. Males had a median income of $29,070 versus $19,745 for females. The per capita income for the city was $16,172. About 9.6% of families and 13.4% of the population were below the poverty line, including 17.1% of those under age 18 and 13.0% of those age 65 or over.

== Education ==
The Chillicothe R-II School District provides preschool through 12th grade education as well as some other educational programs to students in and around Chillicothe.

PK-12th grade

- Chillicothe Early Learning Center (PK)
- Chillicothe Elementary School (K-05)
- Chillicothe Middle School (06–08)
- Chillicothe High School (09–12)

Other programs and campuses

- Hornet Academy
- Grand River Technical School
- Litton Agri-Science Learning Center

Private schools

- Bishop Hogan Memorial School (PK-8), operated by St. Columban Catholic Church, Chillicothe

Public library

The town has a lending library, the Livingston County Library. The town has a children library, the Lillian DesMarias Youth Library.

== Media ==
- Chillicothe Constitution-Tribune, established in 1889
- KCHI Radio- KCHI-AM transmission on 1010 kHz and KCHI-FM on 102.5 MHz.
- KRNW Radio (88.9-an FM repeater station which co-broadcasts Northwest MO State University's flagship station KXCV's programming-NPR affiliated)
- KULH Radio (105.9 The Wave) Christian Radio station

== In popular culture ==
- Chillicothe is known as "The Home of Sliced Bread". On July 7, 1928, the Chillicothe Baking Company began selling pre-sliced bread "at quality grocers in the area", marking the first time sliced bread was available commercially in the world. They used the Rohwedder Bread Slicer, a machine created by Iowa inventor, Otto Frederick Rohwedder.

== Notable people ==
- Shawn Ryan, Navy SEAL and podcaster
- Moses Alexander, 11th governor of Idaho
- Bower Slack Broaddus, judge
- Courtney W. Campbell, congressman
- Ray and Faye Copeland, serial killers
- William Lincoln Garver, architect, author, and socialist politician
- Claude B. Hutchison, botanist and politician
- Mike Lair, politician and teacher
- Jerry Litton, congressman
- Charles H. Mansur, congressman
- Shirley Collie Nelson, country music artist/actress
- Henry Moses Pollard, congressman
- John Quinn, politician
- William Y. Slack, Civil War general and politician
- Stephen J. Stein, American historian of religion
- Clarence Edwin Watkins, publisher
- Caleb Hearon, comedian, writer, and actor
