= KCHI-FM =

- Chillicothe, Missouri; United States
- Frequency: 102.5 MHz

Programming
- Format: Adult contemporary
- Affiliations: Fox News Radio

Ownership
- Owner: Leatherman Communications
- Sister stations: KCHI (AM)

History
- First air date: August 31, 1976 (at 103.9)
- Former frequencies: 103.9 MHz (1976–2002); 98.5 MHz (2002–2013)
- Call sign meaning: Chillicothe

Technical information
- Licensing authority: FCC
- Facility ID: 63378
- Class: A
- ERP: 3,200 watts
- HAAT: 138 meters (453 ft)
- Transmitter coordinates: 39°44′50″N 93°38′38″W

Links
- Public license information: Public file; LMS
- Website: kchi.com

KCHI-FM (102.5 MHz) is a radio station broadcasting an adult contemporary music format. It is licensed to Chillicothe, Missouri, United States. The station is currently owned by Leatherman Communications and features programming from Fox News Radio.

== History ==
Originally on 103.9 FM, the station was once known as "Stereo 104". On May 9, 2007, the station was sold to Leatherman Communications.

On September 13, 2013, KCHI-FM moved up the FM dial to 102.5 FM. While broadcasting on 98.5 FM, the station went off the air for a few hours to upgrade equipment during the morning. When KCHI-FM returned to the air that afternoon, they then began broadcasting on 102.5 FM. The station was licensed to operate on 102.5 FM on November 21, 2013.

== Previous logo ==
(KCHI-FM's logo under previous 98.5 FM frequency)
