= Rush Limbaugh–Sandra Fluke controversy =

2012 American political controversy

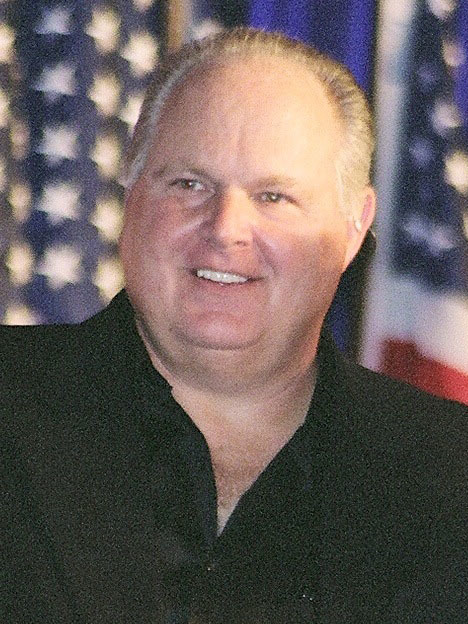
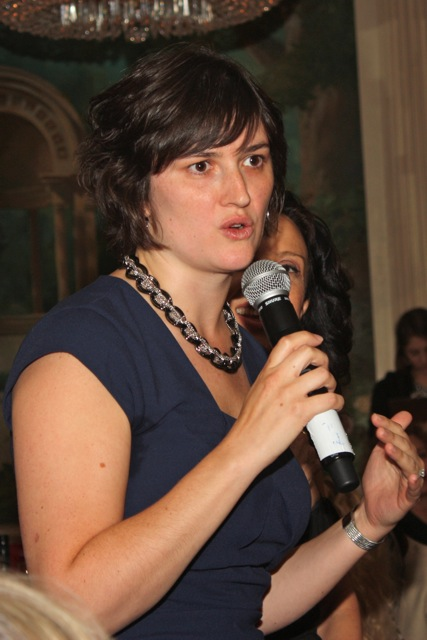
Rush Limbaugh (left, 2009) and Sandra Fluke (2013)

The Rush Limbaugh–Sandra Fluke controversy began on February 29, 2012, when American conservative talk-show host Rush Limbaugh's broadcast remarked about contraceptive mandates, which included statements labeling Georgetown University Law Center student Sandra Fluke as a "slut" and "prostitute". Limbaugh was commenting on Fluke's speech the previous week to House Democrats in support of mandating insurance coverage for contraceptives. Despite disapproval from major political figures, Limbaugh made numerous similar statements over the next two days, which led to the loss of several of his national sponsors and Limbaugh apologizing on his show for some of his comments. Fluke rejected the apology as dubious and inadequate.

== Background ==
Sandra Fluke reading a prepared statement for U.S. Congressional testimony, 16 February 2012.

Sandra Fluke, then a 30-year-old law student at Georgetown University, was invited by Democrats to speak at a hearing by the House Oversight and Government Reform Committee on the new Administration rules on Conscience Clause exceptions in health care. The exception applies to church organizations themselves, but not to affiliated nonprofit corporations, like hospitals, that do not rely primarily on members of the faith as employees. In addition, another exception was created for religious institutions in which an employee can seek birth control directly from the insurance company instead of the religious based nonprofit. Democrats requested the committee add Sandra Fluke to the first panel, which was composed of clergy and theologians. Committee chairman Darrell Issa (R-California) refused, stating that Fluke lacked expertise, was not member of the clergy, and her name was not submitted in time. Democratic members criticized the decision not to include Fluke since it left that panel with only male members, when the hearing covered contraception coverage.

The next week, the House Democratic Steering and Policy Committee convened a meeting to invite Fluke to speak. Fluke put forward reasons that her school, Georgetown, should be compelled to offer contraceptive drugs without co-pay, in spite of the Catholic University's moral opposition to artificial birth control. She said that during the time spent as a law student, birth control could cost $3,000 or more. She also stated that 40% of Georgetown Law School's female population suffered financial hardship as a result of birth control not being covered by the student health insurance plan, and that the lack of contraception coverage in the university insurance plans would induce many low income students to go without contraceptives. She then shared the stories of friends affected by such policies, citing a friend with polyendocrine metabolic ovarian syndrome (PMOS). Fluke said this friend needed contraceptive hormones costing over $100 per month in order to treat this disease, and that while PMOS was covered by Georgetown insurance, the insurance company repeatedly denied contraceptives, because they suspected the purpose of the medication was contraception. Fluke explained that the friend was a lesbian, and therefore did not need birth control. Due to the friend being unable to afford the necessary treatment for her disease, complications arose, requiring surgery and the removal of one ovary. Subsequently, the friend then went through premature ovarian failure, a condition that causes infertility, seriously impacts health, and must be treated for years to come.

== Remarks by Limbaugh ==
On February 29, 2012, after referring to Fluke's statement that "contraceptives can cost a woman over $3,000 during law school", Limbaugh stated:

What does it say about the college co-ed Susan [sic] Fluke, who goes before a congressional committee and essentially says that she must be paid to have sex, what does that make her? It makes her a slut, right? It makes her a prostitute. She wants to be paid to have sex. She's having so much sex she can't afford the contraception. She wants you and me and the taxpayers to pay her to have sex. What does that make us? We're the pimps. (interruption) The johns? We would be the johns? No! We're not the johns. (interruption) Yeah, that's right. Pimp's not the right word. Okay, so she's not a slut. She's "round heeled". I take it back.

He continued that day and stated:

Can you imagine if you're her parents how proud of Sandra Fluke you would be? Your daughter goes up to a congressional hearing conducted by the Botox-filled Nancy Pelosi and testifies she's having so much sex she cannot afford her own birth control pills and she agrees that Obama should provide them, or the Pope.

On March 1, 2012, Limbaugh offered what he said was a "compromise" to contraception coverage: purchasing "all the women at Georgetown University as much aspirin to put between their knees as possible". He continued that he "[ran] some numbers" on contraception costs and argued that contraception coverage was "flat-out thievery" that would force taxpayers to pay to "satisfy the sexual habits of female law students at Georgetown". Later, he dismissed concerns over lack of access to contraception coverage and mocked Fluke's congressional testimony, affecting a baby's voice and pretending to cry, saying: "I'm going broke having sex. I need government to provide me condoms and contraception. It's not fair." He asked, "Ms. Fluke, have you ever heard of not having sex? Have you ever heard of not having sex so often?" After mentioning that Washington, D.C., Department of Health "will send you free condoms and lube", Limbaugh included the "feminazi" term he has popularized and said:

So, Ms. Fluke and the rest of you feminazis, here's the deal. If we are going to pay for your contraceptives, and thus pay for you to have sex, we want something for it, and I'll tell you what it is. We want you to post the videos online so we can all watch.

During the same show, Limbaugh remarked that Fluke is "having so much sex, it's amazing she can still walk", and continued on to suggest that Georgetown should establish a "Wilt Chamberlain scholarship ... exclusively for women". He also asked, "Who bought your condoms in junior high? Who bought your condoms in the sixth grade? Or your contraception. Who bought your contraceptive pills in high school?" He described Fluke as "a woman who is happily presenting herself as an immoral, baseless, no-purpose-to-her life woman. She wants all the sex in the world whenever she wants it, all the time, no consequences. No responsibility for her behavior."

On March 2, 2012, Limbaugh defended his previous comments about Fluke, saying, "not one person says that, 'Well, did you ever think about maybe backing off the amount of sex that you have?'" Limbaugh said that requiring insurance companies to cover contraception is "no different than if somebody knocked on my door that I don't know and said, 'You know what? I'm out of money. I can't afford birth-control pills, and I'm supposed to have sex with three guys tonight.'" Limbaugh commented on Fluke receiving a call from President Obama, who stated that her parents should be proud of her, saying, "I'm gonna button my lip on that one." He went on to say that if his daughter had testified that "she's having so much sex she can't pay for it and wants a new welfare program to pay for it," he would be "embarrassed" and "disconnect the phone", "go into hiding", and "hope the media didn't find me". He continued later, "Oh! Does she have more boyfriends? They're lined up around the block. They would have been in my day." He continued that Fluke testified that her "sex life is active. She's having sex so frequently that she can't afford all the birth-control pills that she needs. That's what she's saying."

== Reaction to Limbaugh's remarks ==
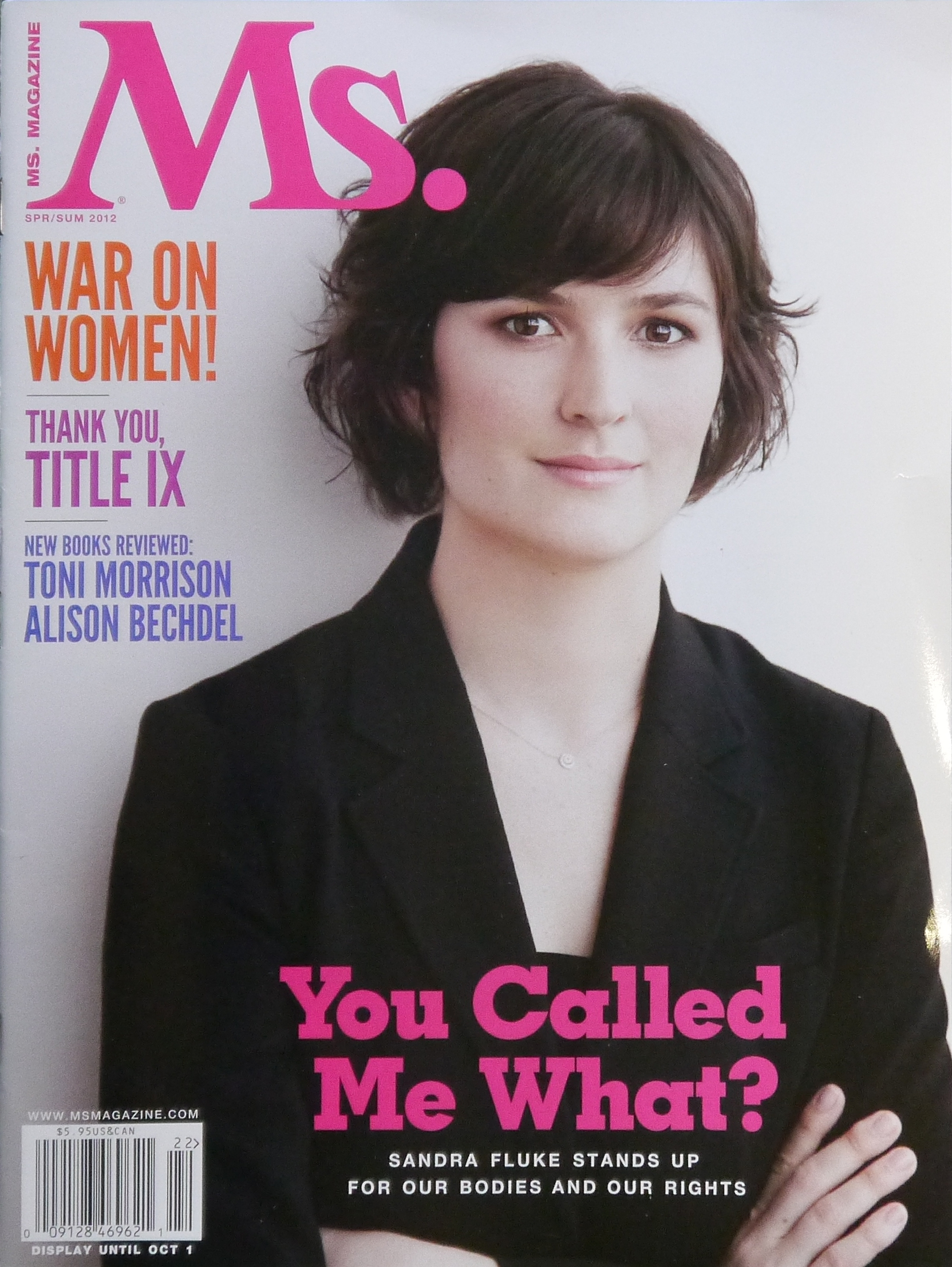
Sandra Fluke on the cover of Ms. in 2012

Many public figures and organizations of all political stripes rejected Limbaugh's comments as sexist. Georgetown University president John DeGioia said Limbaugh's description of Fluke was "misogynistic, vitriolic"; 130 members of the faculty signed a letter supporting Fluke. The National Organization for Women called Limbaugh a "bigoted bully" using "hate-filled speech" to "shame a young woman" for her views. They also called on Clear Channel to drop his show. Rachel Maddow said Limbaugh was trying to fan outrage, and his attacks seemed to be based on the idea that the cost of birth control pills is proportional to the amount of sexual activity.

Peter Gabriel requested that Limbaugh no longer play his song "Sledgehammer" on his show, saying he was "appalled" that the song was played while Limbaugh disparaged Fluke. The Fabulous Thunderbirds also requested the use of their songs, including "Tuff Enuff", be discontinued on the show. Frontman Kim Wilson was "mortified by his (Limbaugh's) attack on this young woman."

Susan MacMillan Emry, a Californian who previously had not been politically active, founded a public relations campaign called Rock the Slut Vote in response to Limbaugh's comments about Fluke.

=== Democratic ===
Democrats characterized both the hearing at which Fluke did not testify, and Limbaugh's comments, as part of a "war on women", a frequent catchphrase used to refer to what are seen as the Republican Party's restrictions on women's rights.

President Obama discusses his phone call to Sandra Fluke

President Barack Obama called Fluke on March 3 to express his support.

Many politicians and pundits responded by calling Limbaugh a "peculiar individual", "despicable", "disgusting", "loathsome" and "a national disgrace", and deploring hateful and derogatory speech within political discourse. Jesse Ferguson, spokesperson for the Democratic Congressional Campaign Committee, said "Limbaugh has come to Republicans' defense in their war on women".

In a letter to donors, Sen. Kirsten Gillibrand (D-N.Y.), wrote that "Rush Limbaugh, the voice of the ultraconservative right, issued one of the most vile tirades against women I've ever heard."

Minority Leader in the House of Representatives Nancy Pelosi called the comments "obnoxious" and "vicious and inappropriate attacks".

Seventy-five Democratic Party lawmakers signed a letter expressing outrage at the remarks labeling them as "sexually charged, patently offensive, obscene", "indecent" and "an abuse of public airwaves".

Rep. Carolyn B. Maloney called it "an attempt to silence people that are speaking out for women".

Michigan state Sen. Gretchen Whitmer asked if Limbaugh would have made similar comments if Fluke had been a man, describing him as a "chauvinist" and his words hate speech. She also tied Republicans to Limbaugh.

Obama campaign advisor David Axelrod said Limbaugh's comments were "predicated on a lie" that taxpayers would have to pay for contraceptive coverage, when in fact it is insurance companies that will have to pay.

Democratic political analyst for Fox News Kirsten Powers agreed that Limbaugh was a misogynist and deserved to be boycotted, but expanded her position further stating, "the liberals who led the charge need to start holding their own side accountable." She then cited specific examples of crude and vulgar language being directed toward women by Chris Matthews, Ed Schultz, Keith Olbermann, Matt Taibbi, and Bill Maher. Powers went on to say, "when it comes to high-profile campaigns to hold these men accountable—such as that waged against Limbaugh—the real fury seems reserved only for conservatives."

=== Republican ===
Republican presidential hopeful Mitt Romney said "it's not the language I would have used." Fellow Republican primary candidate Rick Santorum dismissed the comments stating that "an entertainer can be absurd." U.S. Congressman Ron Paul (R-Texas), running for the party's presidential nomination, said that Limbaugh's comments were "over the top" and that his apology was not sincere, while disagreeing with Fluke on the insurance mandate.

Senator John McCain (R-Arizona), the party's 2008 candidate for president, said Limbaugh's statements were unacceptable "in every way" and "should be condemned" by people across the political spectrum.

House Speaker John Boehner criticized Limbaugh's choice of words while repeating his own opposition to government funding for contraception. Boehner's spokesman issued a statement: "The [S]peaker obviously believes the use of those words was inappropriate, as is trying to raise money off the situation".

Conservative commentator George Will suggested other Republicans made only mild criticisms because they are afraid of Limbaugh.

David Frum, former special assistant to President George W. Bush (emphasis in the original): "Limbaugh's verbal abuse of Sandra Fluke set a new kind of low. I can't recall anything as brutal, ugly and deliberate ever being said by such a prominent person and so emphatically repeated. This was not a case of a bad 'word choice'. It was a brutally sexualized accusation, against a specific person, prolonged over three days."

== Limbaugh's apology ==
On March 3, Limbaugh repeated his previous attacks against Fluke and insurance coverage for contraception. Later that day he released an apology on his official website:

For over 20 years, I have illustrated the absurd with absurdity, three hours a day, five days a week. In this instance, I chose the wrong words in my analogy of the situation. I did not mean a personal attack on Ms. Fluke. I think it is absolutely absurd that during these very serious political times, we are discussing personal sexual recreational activities before members of Congress. I personally do not agree that American citizens should pay for these social activities. What happened to personal responsibility and accountability? Where do we draw the line? If this is accepted as the norm, what will follow? Will we be debating if taxpayers should pay for new sneakers for all students that are interested in running to keep fit? In my monologue, I posited that it is not our business whatsoever to know what is going on in anyone's bedroom nor do I think it is a topic that should reach a Presidential level. / My choice of words was not the best, and in the attempt to be humorous, I created a national stir. I sincerely apologize to Ms. Fluke for the insulting word choices.

On March 5, 2012, Limbaugh repeated parts of his apology on his show, but criticized the reaction he received, saying:

I acted too much like the leftists who despise me. I descended to their level, using names and exaggerations. It's what we've come to expect from them, but it's way beneath me.

The same day, Fluke responded to his latest apology on ABC's The View saying:

I don't think that a statement like this, saying that his choice of words was not the best, changes anything, and especially when that statement is issued when he's under significant pressure from his sponsors who have begun to pull their support from the show. / I think any woman who has ever been called these types of names is [shocked] at first. / But then I tried to see this for what it is, and I believe that what it is, is an attempt to silence me, to silence the millions of women and the men who support them who have been speaking out about this issue and conveying that contraception is an important healthcare need that they need to have met in an affordable, accessible way.

She said Limbaugh's comments were not of "one person who went crazy" but that "he insulted me more than 50 times over three days".

Six months after the controversy began, in response to Fluke's being considered for Time's Person of the Year, Limbaugh said in part that his comments were a mistake: "If anybody is going to be named Person of the Year on that basis, it ought to be me. It's not an 'honor' I would appreciate because it represents a little bit of a screw up." ... "Nobody would know who she is if it weren't for me."

== Loss of sponsors and stations ==
In response to Limbaugh's remarks several online and social media campaigns were created such as a Flush Rush group on Facebook and the Stop Rush database. As a result, by March 3, over a dozen advertisers had discontinued their sponsorship. After Limbaugh's apology, the exodus slowed but did not stop, with competing number counts in the dozens. Several advertisers also clarified that they "did not intentionally advertise" on the show, either running ads in news segments next to the Limbaugh show or being held responsible for local affiliates' local buys. Two stations, KPUA, a talk radio station serving Hilo, Hawaii, and broadcaster WBEC in Pittsfield, Massachusetts, discontinued their broadcasts of the Rush Limbaugh show.

Clear Channel Communications, the owner of Premiere Networks and a large number of Limbaugh's affiliates, has reaffirmed its support for Limbaugh, whose contract at the time ran through 2016.

On March 9, Politico estimated that Limbaugh's talk show had lost 45 sponsors, a number that includes advertisers that purchased ad time on local stations but had never bought national advertising on the show itself.

Radio competitors Cumulus Media Networks tried to lure advertisers and stations away from the Limbaugh show during the crisis, hinting that numbers of affiliates had agreed to drop the program in favor of The Mike Huckabee Show. On March 19, they released a list of all 31 advertisers that they identified as having specifically dropped Limbaugh's program.

Clear Channel lifted its two-week moratorium on using barter advertising during the show on March 26. Thereafter, Kohler and Reputation.com pulled advertising.

A March 28 post-mortem on the end of the campaign by The Washington Post concluded:

Exactly one month after the conservative radio host sparked outrage ... stations are standing by him, advertisers are trickling back to his program and the news media have moved on ... Angelo Carusone, who has been leading the anti-Limbaugh efforts for Media Matters for America, a Washington organization ... acknowledged that outrage is hard to sustain.

Media Matters began a paid ad campaign on March 22 to sustain their online campaign against Limbaugh. The group spent over $100,000 in various markets, to encourage more stations to drop the Limbaugh show. Limbaugh countered, "Media Matters and the Democrat National Committee and the Democrat Party are exposing ... that their Astroturf campaigns are not grassroots at all.... They are totally professionally created and executed Democrat Party opposition research-type attacks." Clear Channel's CEO said there has been no major move among stations to drop the show.

=== Impact on other networks ===
Limbaugh earned an unlikely ally when Ed Schultz, the nation's most widely syndicated progressive talk radio host, came out in opposition to the boycott and urged Media Matters to drop its efforts, which Media Matters refused to do. According to Schultz, "If we start attacking advertisers because of what somebody said — it's the wrong thing to do (...) There's a lot of people getting hurt. This is going to too far." Thom Hartmann, another progressive talk host who competes in Limbaugh's time slot (and who is heard on many of the same stations as Schultz), noted that the Media Matters campaign had caused the unintended consequence of driving sponsors away from not just Limbaugh, but political talk in general, including progressive talk, in an interview with the talk show Reliable Sources in August 2013.

Lew Dickey, the CEO of Cumulus Media Networks, stated that it cost his company "a couple of million bucks in the first quarter and a couple of million bucks in quarter two." He claimed that the losses accounted for one percent of the 3.5 percent loss in revenue that Cumulus suffered over this period. He said things looked like they would be back to normal in June. Limbaugh announced that when his 2013 contract with Cumulus expires, he would revisit dropping the distributor, due to Dickey's repeated attempts to blame ratings problem on the Limbaugh show. In June 2013, Premiere, Limbaugh's primary distributor, stated that his advertising sales were recovering well.

The advertiser boycott effectively created a blacklist of stations that carry Limbaugh's program, and other shows on those stations were adversely affected; advertisers were unwilling to advertise on a show on the same station, lest its barter advertisements (commercials that air at a different time of day) be heard on Limbaugh's program. Fox News Radio and the Wall Street Journal Radio Network, both of which shared a majority of their affiliates with Limbaugh's, both lost an estimated 40% of their revenues due to being carried on many of the same stations as Limbaugh; the revenue loss forced the latter network to fold in December 2014. This station blacklist was also speculated as the impetus behind a number of affiliate changes Limbaugh experienced over the following several years, as stations were unable to sell enough airtime on a blacklisted station to cover Limbaugh's very high rights fee; ownership groups were thus forced to spin Limbaugh and other blacklisted programs (the Glenn Beck Radio Program, also distributed by Premiere and itself the subject of boycotts) off to less prominent stations and clear their schedules of controversial programming to get off the blacklist.

== Cultural impact ==
Philosopher Kate Manne uses Limbaugh's behavior toward Fluke as an example of an aspect of misogyny in her book Down Girl: The Logic of Misogyny. Manne observes that Limbaugh spoke of Fluke as though Fluke owed something to him and to his audience, though Fluke and Limbaugh were in fact strangers to each other. This illustrates that an attitude of entitlement to women may be projected onto a single, specific woman designated by the misogynist to be guilty of causing his personal frustrations, according to Manne.

== See also ==
- Reproductive health
