= Thomas Hazlett =

American economist (born 1952)

Thomas W. Hazlett
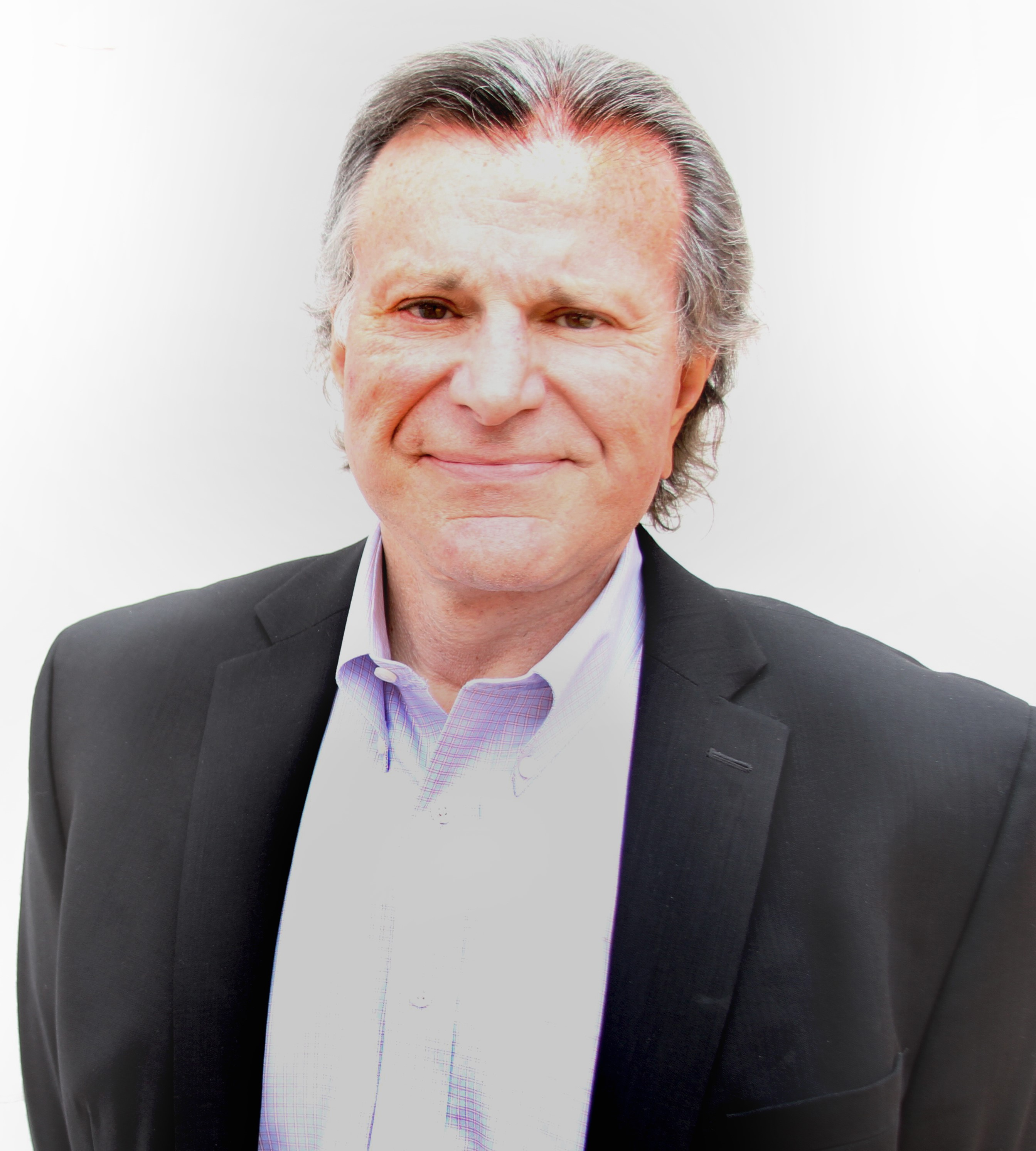
- Born: 1952 (age 73–74)

Academic background
- Influences: Carl Menger; Friedrich Hayek

Academic work
- School or tradition: Austrian School
- Website: Information at IDEAS / RePEc

Thomas W. Hazlett is the Hugh H. Macaulay Endowed Professor of Economics in the John E. Walker Department of Economics at Clemson University where he also directs the Information Economy Project.

Hazlett's essays have appeared in the Wall Street Journal, New York Times, The Economist, The New Republic, The Weekly Standard, and Time. He was a New Technology Policy Forum columnist for the Financial Times, 2002–11, and wrote the "Selected Skirmishes" column for Reason magazine (1989–2000). He is a founding partner of the consulting firm, Arlington Economics, with economists David Porter and Vernon L. Smith. He serves as a Director of the Telecommunications Research Policy Conference, and is a member of the editorial boards of INFO, Telecommunications Policy, and the Supreme Court Economic Review. Hazlett is the author of several books, most recently releasing The Political Spectrum: The Tumultuous Liberation of Wireless Technology, from Herbert Hoover to the Smartphone in May 2017. A Wall Street Journal review called the ideas presented in the book "reason for cautious optimism about our wireless future."

== Education and career ==
Hazlett earned a Ph.D. in economics from UCLA in 1984 and taught economics at the University of California at Davis and the Wharton School. In 1991–92, he served as Chief Economist of the Federal Communications Commission. He was a Resident Scholar at the American Enterprise Institute 1998–2001 and a Senior Fellow at the Manhattan Institute 2001–2005. From 2005 to 2013, Hazlett was Professor of Law and Economics at George Mason University. In 2014, he moved to Clemson University in South Carolina where, in addition to his duties as Director of the Information Economy Project, he teaches classes on Law and Economics and the Economics of Regulation.

== Research ==
Hazlett's research is focused on the public choice and public policy aspects of regulatory measures in the communications sector. His 1990 article, "The Rationality of U.S. Regulation of the Broadcast Spectrum," presented a "revisionist" explanation as to why radio spectrum is allocated and licensed by regulators. The traditional view, given by the U.S. Supreme Court, was that policy makers were confronted by a "tragedy of the commons" and were forced by circumstances to manage wireless services. Ronald Coase critiqued the idea that government control was inevitable, but argued that policymakers were unaware of market alternatives. Hazlett showed that radio broadcasting actually developed according to common law property rules and that the move to political control was the result of pressure by incumbent radio stations and key policy makers (including Secretary of Commerce Herbert Hoover) to foreclose competitive entry.

As a policy advocate, Hazlett argued for auctions in assigning wireless licenses prior to Congressional approval of the reform in 1993, and has advanced further liberalization in the use of frequencies. In particular, he recommends that TV Band frequencies should be bid into more valuable uses. This idea was considered highly controversial in the broadcast industry when proposed, but it has become widely accepted: while Hazlett's views were "so radical that the economist's suggestion was dismissed as Ivory Tower ranting," wrote a trade journal in 2004, "no one is laughing now." By 2010, the FCC's National Broadband Plan proposed a major shift of TV frequencies to wireless broadband. Hazlett's articles in the Financial Times, as well as Richard Thaler's New York Times article on Hazlett's proposal to repurpose spectrum, may have helped popularize the notion.

Hazlett has also written extensively about regulation in cable TV markets, promoting the consumer advantages of head-to-head competition and advocating the removal of franchise barriers. He served as the economic expert (for the plaintiff) in Preferred Communications v. City of Los Angeles, the 1986 case in which the Supreme Court effectively declared monopoly cable TV franchises to be a violation of the First Amendment. He has written about problems in the development of cable competition and his 1995 article, "Predation in Local Cable TV Markets," is cited as one of the strongest documentations that predatory pricing occurred.

Other areas of Hazlett's research involve cable TV price controls, the impact of antitrust action against Microsoft, and network neutrality rules. In addition to his book The Fallacy of Net Neutrality, Hazlett's article with FTC Commissioner Joshua D. Wright, "The Law and Economics of Network Neutrality," provides a comprehensive analysis and critique of the 2010 rules adopted by the Federal Communications Commission. Hazlett's 2011 Harvard Law School debate on the subject, with network neutrality supporter and law professor Tim Wu, states his case.

== Personal ==
Hazlett is married and has two teen-aged daughters. He was born in Los Angeles and grew up in the San Fernando Valley. In his youth, he attended Los Angeles city schools and worked as a child actor, appearing in TV shows such as McHale's Navy, The Monkees, and Land of the Giants, movies such as Walt Disney's Follow Me Boys, and commercials for Wonder Bread and the Ford Torino. Having studied dance, he auditioned to join the traveling Bolshoi Ballet in Hollywood in 1962, but was rejected and ultimately studied economics instead.

In 1992, his attempt to assist in his mother's fight against cancer, impeded by FDA regulations blocking advanced treatments available in Japan and elsewhere, was described in Forbes and later chronicled in Philip K. Howard's book, The Death of Common Sense.

== Works ==
- Hazlett, T.W. and Spitzer, M.L. (1997). Public Policy toward Cable Television: The Economics of Rate Controls. MIT Press. ISBN 978-0262082532. OCLC 36900920
- Hazlett, T.W. and Arrison, S. (2003). Telecrisis: How Regulation Stifles High-Speed Internet Access. San Francisco, Calif: Pacific Research Institute for Public Policy. ISBN 978-0936488899. OCLC 52769516
- Hazlett, T.W. (2011). The Fallacy of Net Neutrality. New York: Encounter Books. ISBN 978-1594035920. OCLC 724661824
- Hazlett, T.W. (2017). The Political Spectrum: The Tumultuous Liberation of Wireless Technology, from Herbert Hoover to the Smartphone. Yale University Press. ISBN 978-0300210507. OCLC 961312417

=== Other ===
- Hazlett, Thomas W. (2008). "Apartheid". In Henderson, David R. (ed.). The Concise Encyclopedia of Economics. Library of Economics and Liberty (2nd ed.). Liberty Fund. pp. 14–19. ISBN 978-0865976665.

== Other ==
Rush Limbaugh, who was a friend of Hazlett, credited Hazlett with coining the term "feminazi" to, as Limbaugh stated, "describe any female who is intolerant of any point of view that challenges militant feminism."
