= Straw feminism =

Distortion or fabrication of feminist arguments

Straw feminism is a form of straw man argument used by antifeminists in which a distorted or fabricated version of feminism is used in an attempt to mock or dismiss feminist arguments. A straw feminist then is a fabricated character that often uses oversimplifications, misrepresentations and stereotypes in order to discredit feminism as a whole. For example, straw feminists are often depicted as promoting incendiary beliefs such as "all men are evil". Media researcher Michele White argues that straw feminism creates a burden for feminists who are constantly expected to refute the straw-feminist position, with the intent of making feminism unpalatable to potential supporters.

== See also ==
- Feminazi
- Men's rights
- Misandry
- Sexism
- Woke
