= Rush Limbaugh =

American political commentator (1951–2021)

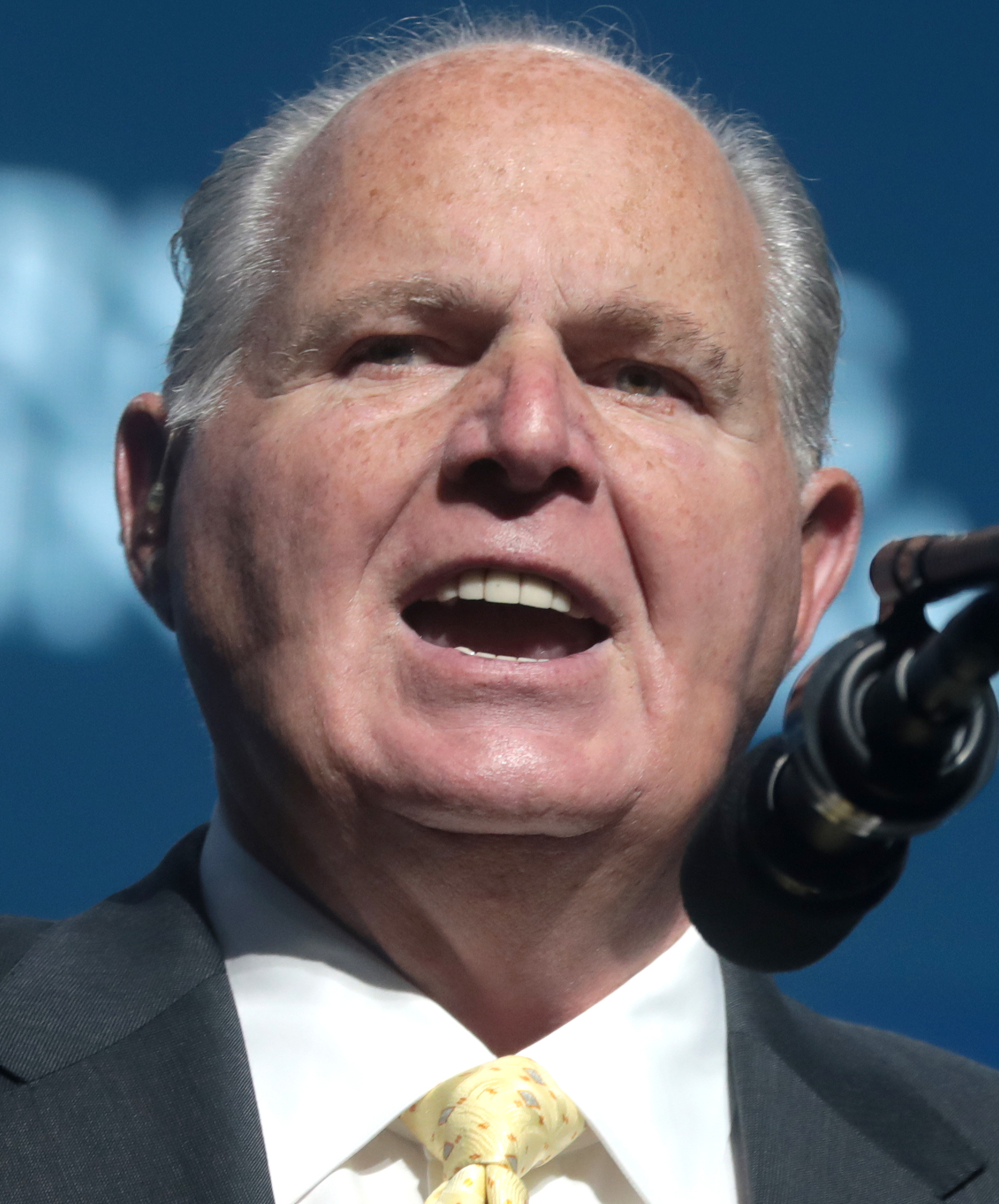
- Limbaugh in 2019
- Born: Rush Hudson Limbaugh III; January 12, 1951; Cape Girardeau, Missouri, U.S.
- Died: February 17, 2021 (aged 70); Palm Beach, Florida, U.S.
- Resting place: Bellefontaine Cemetery, St. Louis, Missouri
- Occupations: Radio host; political pundit
- Years active: 1967–2021
- Spouses: Roxy Maxine McNeely (m. 1977; div. 1980) Michelle Sixta (m. 1983; div. 1990) Marta Fitzgerald (m. 1994; div. 2004) Kathryn Rogers (m. 2010)
- Relatives: Limbaugh family
- Awards: Marconi Award × 5; Radio Hall of Fame (1993); NAB Hall of Fame (1998); Medal of Freedom (2020)
- Website: rushlimbaugh.com

Rush Hudson Limbaugh III (/ˈlɪmbɔː/ LIM-baw; January 12, 1951 – February 17, 2021) was an American conservative political commentator who was the host of The Rush Limbaugh Show, which first aired in 1984 and was nationally syndicated on AM and FM radio stations from 1988 until his death in 2021.

Limbaugh became one of the most prominent conservative voices in the United States during the 1990s and hosted a national television show from 1992 to 1996. He was among the most highly paid figures in American radio history; in 2018 Forbes listed his earnings at $84.5 million. In December 2019, Talkers Magazine estimated that Limbaugh's show attracted a cumulative weekly audience of 15.5 million listeners to become the most-listened-to radio show in the United States. Limbaugh also wrote seven books; his first two, The Way Things Ought to Be (1992) and See, I Told You So (1993), made The New York Times Best Seller list.

Limbaugh garnered controversy from his statements on race, LGBT matters, feminism, sexual consent, and climate change. In 1993, he was inducted into the National Radio Hall of Fame and in 1998 the National Association of Broadcasters Hall of Fame. During the 2020 State of the Union Address, President Donald Trump awarded him the Presidential Medal of Freedom.

== Early life ==
Limbaugh was born on January 12, 1951, in Cape Girardeau, Missouri, to parents Rush Hudson Limbaugh II and Mildred Carolyn (née Armstrong) Limbaugh. He and his younger brother David were born into the prominent political Limbaugh family; his father was a lawyer and a United States fighter pilot who served in the China Burma India Theater of World War II. His mother was from Searcy, Arkansas. The name "Rush" was originally chosen for his grandfather to honor the maiden name of a family member, Edna Rush.

Limbaugh was partly of German ancestry. The family includes many lawyers, including his grandfather, father and brother; his uncle, Stephen N. Limbaugh Sr., was a federal judge in the United States District Court for the Eastern District of Missouri. His cousin, Stephen N. Limbaugh Jr., is a judge in the same court, appointed by George W. Bush. Limbaugh's grandfather, Rush Limbaugh Sr., was a Missouri prosecutor, judge, special commissioner, member of the Missouri House of Representatives in the 1930s, and longtime president of the Missouri Historical Society.

In 1969, Limbaugh graduated from Cape Girardeau Central High School, where he played football and was a Boys State delegate. At age 16, he worked his first radio job at KGMO, a local radio station. He used the airname Rusty Sharpe having found "Sharpe" in a telephone book. Limbaugh later cited Chicago DJ Larry Lujack as a major influence on him, saying Lujack was "the only person I ever copied." In deference to his parents' desire that he attend college, he enrolled at Southeast Missouri State University but dropped out after two semesters. According to his mother, "he flunked everything [...] he just didn't seem interested in anything except radio." Biographer Zev Chafets asserts that Limbaugh's life was in large part dedicated to gaining his father's respect.

== Career ==
=== 1971–1988: Early radio career ===
In February 1971, after dropping out of college, the 20-year-old Limbaugh accepted an offer to DJ at WIXZ, a Top 40 station in McKeesport, Pennsylvania. He adopted the airname "Bachelor Jeff" Christie and worked afternoons before moving to morning drive. The station's general manager compared Limbaugh's style at this time to "early Imus". In 1973, after eighteen months at WIXZ, Limbaugh was fired from the station due to "personality conflict" with the program director. He then started a nighttime position at KQV in Pittsburgh, succeeding Jim Quinn. In late 1974, Limbaugh was dismissed after new management put pressure on the program director to fire him. Limbaugh recalled the general manager telling him that he would never land success as an air personality and suggested a career in radio sales. After rejecting his only offer at the time, a position in Neenah, Wisconsin, Limbaugh returned to living with his parents in Cape Girardeau. During his time in Pittsburgh, he became a lifelong fan of the Steelers NFL team.

In 1975, Limbaugh began an afternoon show at the Top 40 station KUDL in Kansas City, Missouri. He soon became the host of a public affairs talk program that aired on weekend mornings which allowed him to develop his style and present more controversial ideas. In 1977, he was let go from the station but remained in Kansas City to start an evening show at KFIX. The stint was short-lived, however, and disagreements with management led to his dismissal weeks later. By this time, Limbaugh had become disillusioned with radio and felt pressure to pursue a different career. He looked back on himself as "a moderate failure [...] as a deejay". In 1979, he accepted a part-time role in group sales for the Kansas City Royals baseball team which developed into a full-time position as director of group sales and special events. He worked from the Royals Stadium. There he developed a friendship with then-Royals star third baseman and future Hall of Famer George Brett. The two men remained close friends. Limbaugh said that business trips to Europe and Asia during this time developed his conservative views as he considered countries in those geographic areas to have lower standards of living than the United States.

In November 1983, Limbaugh returned to radio at KMBZ (AM) in Kansas City for a year. He decided to drop his on-air moniker and broadcast under his real name. He was fired from the station, but weeks later he landed a spot on KFBK in Sacramento, California, replacing Morton Downey Jr. The show launched on October 14, 1984. Limbaugh began to express his political opinions in 1985 when he mocked the Great Peace March for Global Nuclear Disarmament, which he considered along with the general anti-war movement to be "inherently anti-US, yet was reported as substantive and morally correct by a willing and sympathetic media". The FCC's repeal of the fairness doctrine—which had required that stations provide free air time for responses to any controversial opinions that were broadcast—on August 5, 1987, meant stations could broadcast editorial commentary without having to present opposing views. Daniel Henninger wrote, in a Wall Street Journal editorial, "Ronald Reagan tore down this wall [the fairness doctrine] in 1987 ... and Rush Limbaugh was the first man to proclaim himself liberated from the East Germany of liberal media domination."

=== 1988–1990s: WABC New York City, syndication, and tie brand ===
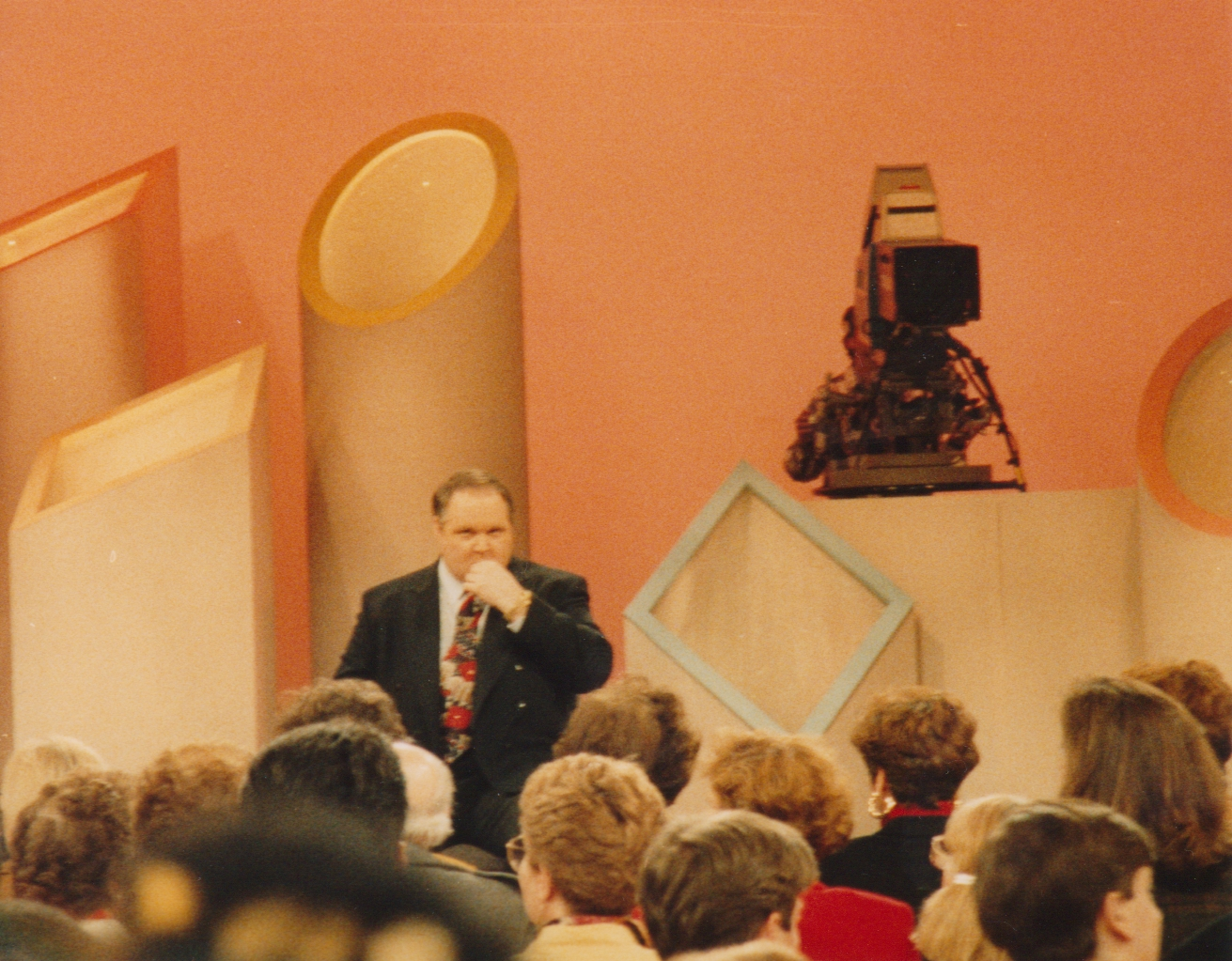
At The Phil Donahue Show, 1991

In 1988, former ABC Radio Network executive Ed McLaughlin offered Limbaugh the nationally syndicated 12pm–2pm slot at ABC Radio Network to replace Owen Spann. Since many local radio stations of the time were hesitant to carry nationally syndicated programming during the daytime, he also secured Limbaugh a separate 10am–12pm show at WABC-AM in New York City to satisfy the provision of his contract requiring employment in a Top 5 market to leave KMBZ.

Limbaugh began his new show at WABC-AM on July 4, 1988, with the first episode focusing on the Iran Air Flight 655 shootdown the previous day. His national program debuted on 50 stations the next month on August 1, and by three months later had expanded to 100 stations. He debuted just weeks after the Democratic National Convention, and just weeks before the Republican National Convention. Limbaugh's radio home in New York City was the talk-formatted WABC (AM), and this remained his flagship station for many years, even after Limbaugh moved to West Palm Beach, Florida, from where he broadcast his show. Limbaugh's show moved on January 1, 2014, to WABC's cross-town rival WOR (AM), its final New York outlet.

By 1990, Limbaugh had been on his Rush to Excellence Tour, a series of personal appearances in cities nationwide, for two years. For the 45 shows he completed that year alone, he was estimated to have made around $360,000.

In December 1990, journalist Lewis Grossberger wrote in The New York Times Magazine that Limbaugh had "more listeners than any other talk show host" and described Limbaugh's style as "bouncing between earnest lecturer and political vaudevillian". Limbaugh's rising profile coincided with the Gulf War, coupled with a stalwart support for the war effort and relentless ridicule of peace activists. The program was moved to stations with larger audiences, eventually being broadcast on over 650 radio stations nationwide.

By the 1992 United States presidential election, Limbaugh had established himself as an influential political commentator. During the Republican Party presidential primaries, Limbaugh expressed a preference for Pat Buchanan over the incumbent George H. W. Bush, which Buchanan himself attributed to his early success in the primaries. Bush's campaign subsequently worked to court Limbaugh, culminating with an invitation to stay overnight at the White House's Lincoln Bedroom. Limbaugh was also given a seat at the president's box in the Houston Astrodome during the 1992 Republican National Convention, and both President Bush and Vice President Dan Quayle appeared on Limbaugh's program.

In November 1992, Democrat Bill Clinton was elected President of the United States. Limbaugh satirized the policies of Clinton and First Lady Hillary Clinton, as well as those of the Democratic Party in general. Following the Republican Revolution, in which the party regained control of Congress in the 1994 midterm elections after several decades, the freshman Republican class awarded Limbaugh an honorary membership in their caucus, crediting him with having had a role in their success.

In 1995, Limbaugh started selling a line of neckties under the brand No Boundaries Collection, designed by his then-wife Marta without themes, ties to politics, or ties to issues. Limbaugh complained about coverage of the line, which he said underrated the ties' radicalness, and said media descriptions were emblematic of their general inaccuracy. Sold in nearly 1,500 retail outlets by 1996, the brand sold more than $5,000,000 worth in the first year. The New York Times described the designs: "Much like their promulgator, Mr. Limbaugh's four dozen or so styles seem designed to evoke maximum sensory outrage. Like Rainbow Black, whose interweaving rainbow strands and blue raindrops play around an Ionic column, atop which a cranberry-red pomegranate tree sprouts from an urn. Or Triangle Red, with colliding stacks of black-and-yellow triangles and disjointed horizontal black stripes on a background of speckled salmon." In 2000, Limbaugh rented the email list collected from the No Boundaries website to Rudy Giuliani's senate campaign. The business dissolved along with his marriage to Marta but in 2020 the ties were still being sold by TieGal, Inc., for $29 each.

=== 2000s ===
Limbaugh had publicized personal difficulties in the 2000s. In late 2001, he acknowledged that he had become almost completely deaf, although he continued his show. He was able to regain much of his hearing with the help of a cochlear implant in 2001.

In 2003, Limbaugh had a brief stint as a professional football commentator with ESPN. He resigned a few weeks into the 2003 NFL season after making comments about the press coverage for quarterback Donovan McNabb that caused controversy and accusations of racism on the part of Limbaugh. His comment about McNabb was:

I don't think he's been that good from the get-go. I think what we've had here is a little social concern in the NFL. I think the media has been very desirous that a black quarterback do well. They're interested in black coaches and black quarterbacks doing well. I think there's a little hope invested in McNabb and he got a lot of credit for the performance of his team that he really didn't deserve. The defense carried this team.

The sportswriter Peter King construed the comment as "boneheaded". The sports analyst Allen Barra wrote Limbaugh's viewpoint was shared by "many football fans and analysts" and "it is ... absurd to say that the sports media haven't overrated Donovan McNabb because he's black".

In 2003, Limbaugh stated that he was addicted to pain medication, and sought treatment. In April 2006, Limbaugh turned himself in to authorities, on a warrant issued by the Palm Beach County state attorney's office, and was arrested "on a single charge of prescription fraud". His record was later expunged.

=== 2010s ===
In 2013, news reports indicated that Cumulus Media, some of whose stations carried Limbaugh's program in certain major markets, including New York, Chicago, Dallas, Washington D.C., and Detroit, was considering dropping his show when its contract with Limbaugh expired at the end of that year, reportedly because the company believed that its advertising revenues had been hurt by listener reaction to controversial Limbaugh comments. Limbaugh himself said that the reports were overblown and that it was a matter of routine dollars-and-cents negotiations between Cumulus and his network syndication partner, Premiere Networks, a unit of Clear Channel Communications. Ultimately, the parties reached agreement on a new contract, with Limbaugh's show moving from its long-time flagship outlet in New York, the Cumulus-owned WABC, to the latter's cross-town rival, the Clear Channel-owned WOR, starting January 1, 2014, but remaining on the Cumulus-owned stations it was being carried on in other markets.

=== 2020s ===
In January 2021, Limbaugh called the GameStop short squeeze "the most fascinating thing" to happen in a long time and said that "the elites are bent out of shape that a bunch of average, ordinary users have figured out how to make themselves billionaires".

=== The Rush Limbaugh Show ===
Limbaugh's radio show aired for three hours each weekday beginning at noon Eastern Time on both AM and FM radio. The program was also broadcast worldwide on the Armed Forces Radio Network.

Radio broadcasting shifted from AM to FM in the 1970s because of the opportunity to broadcast music in stereo with better fidelity (AM stations in the United States would not get the opportunity to broadcast in stereo sound until August 2, 1982). Limbaugh's show was first nationally syndicated in August 1988, on the AM radio band. Limbaugh's popularity paved the way for other conservative talk radio programming to become commonplace on AM radio. The show increased its audience in the 1990s to the extent that even some FM stations picked it up. As of January 2019, about half of Limbaugh's affiliate stations were on the FM dial.

Limbaugh used props, songs, and photos to introduce his monologues on various topics. On his radio show, news about homeless people was often preceded by the Clarence "Frogman" Henry song "Ain't Got No Home".

In March 2006, WBAL in Baltimore became the first major market radio station in the country to drop Limbaugh's nationally syndicated radio program. In 2007, TALKERS Magazine again named him No. 1 in its "Heavy Hundred" most important talk show hosts.

Limbaugh frequently mentioned the EIB (Excellence In Broadcasting) Network, trademarked in 1990. In the beginning, his show was co-owned and first syndicated by Edward F. McLaughlin, former president of ABC, who founded EFM Media in 1988, with Limbaugh's show as his first product. In 1997, McLaughlin sold EFM to Jacor Communications, which was ultimately bought up by Clear Channel Communications. Limbaugh owned a majority of the show, which is syndicated by the Premiere Radio Networks.

According to a 2001 article in U.S. News & World Report, Limbaugh had an eight-year contract, at the rate of $31.25 million a year. In 2007, Limbaugh earned $33 million. A November 2008 poll by Zogby International found that Limbaugh was the most trusted news personality in the nation, garnering 12.5 percent of poll responses.

Limbaugh signed a $400-million, eight-year contract in 2008 with what was then Clear Channel Communications, making him the highest-paid broadcaster on terrestrial radio. On August 2, 2016, Limbaugh signed a four-year extension of the 2008 contract. At the announcement of the extension, Premiere Radio Networks and iHeartMedia announced that his show experienced audience growth with 18% growth in adults 25–54, 27% growth with 25–54 women, and ad revenue growth of 20% year over year.

In 2018, Limbaugh was the world's second (behind Howard Stern) highest-paid radio host, reportedly earning $84.5 million. On January 5, 2020, Limbaugh renewed his contract again. Though media reports said it was "a long-term" renewal (with no length specified), according to Donald Trump, it was a four-year deal.

Regular guest host Ken Matthews was also selected a TALKERS Magazine "Heavy Hundred".

In May, Premiere Networks announced that on June 21, 2021, The Limbaugh Show radio timeslot would be taken over by Clay Travis and Buck Sexton in hundreds of markets.

=== Television show ===
Limbaugh had a syndicated half-hour television show from 1992 through 1996, produced by Roger Ailes. The show discussed many of the topics on his radio show, and was taped in front of an audience. In the months after its debut on September 12, 1992, it was the third highest rated late-night television show after Nightline and The Tonight Show with Jay Leno. Limbaugh said he loved doing his radio show, but not a TV show.

=== Other media appearances ===
Limbaugh's first television hosting experience came March 30, 1990, as a guest host on Pat Sajak's CBS late-night talk show, The Pat Sajak Show. ACT UP activists in the audience heckled Limbaugh repeatedly; ultimately the entire studio audience was cleared. In 2001, Sajak said the incident was "legendary around CBS".

On December 17, 1993, Limbaugh appeared on the Late Show with David Letterman. Limbaugh also guest-starred (as himself) on a 1994 episode of Hearts Afire. He appeared in the 1995 Billy Crystal film Forget Paris, and in 1998 on an episode of The Drew Carey Show.

In 2007, Limbaugh made cameo appearances on Fox News Channel's short-lived The 1/2 Hour News Hour in a series of parodies portraying him as the future President of the United States. In the parodies, his vice president was fellow conservative pundit Ann Coulter. That year, he also made a cameo in the Family Guy episode "Blue Harvest", a parody of Star Wars in which Limbaugh can be heard on the radio claiming that the "liberal galactic media" were lying about climate change on the planet Hoth, and that Lando Calrissian's administrative position on Cloud City was a result of affirmative action. His later appearances on Family Guy were in the 2010 episode "Excellence in Broadcasting", and 2011's "Episode VI: It's a Trap!", a parody of Return of the Jedi.

== Views ==
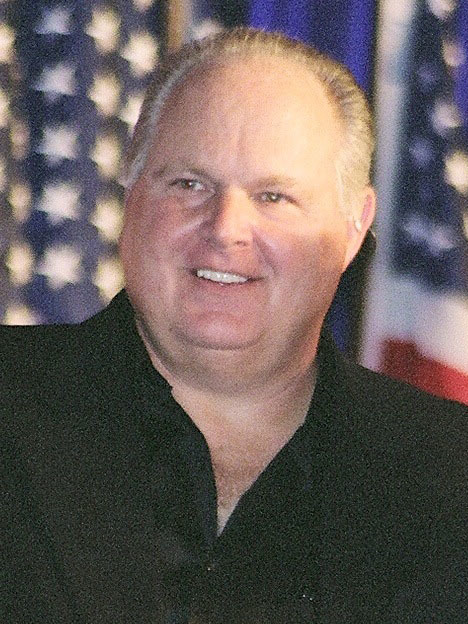
Limbaugh in 2009

In his first New York Times best seller, Limbaugh described himself as conservative, and was critical of broadcasters in many media outlets for claiming to be objective. He called for the adoption of core conservative philosophies in order to ensure the survival of the Republican Party. Limbaugh criticized the media and political activist movements such as feminism, environmentalism, and animal rights activism for allegedly serving as outlets for "anticapitalism, secular humanism, and socialism". Limbaugh, a proponent of American exceptionalism, often criticized politicians he believed reject this notion seeing them as unpatriotic or anti-American.

=== Race ===
Limbaugh was known for making racist statements regarding African Americans. He once opined that all newspaper composite pictures of wanted criminals resembled Jesse Jackson, and another time that "the NFL all too often looks like a game between the Bloods and the Crips without any weapons." While employed as what he described as an "insult-radio" DJ, he used a derogatory racial stereotype to characterize a black caller he could not understand, telling the caller to "take that bone out of your nose and call me back", although he expressed guilt over this when recounting it. Limbaugh asserted in 2008 that African Americans, in contrast with other minority groups, are "left behind" socially because they have been systematically trained from a young age to hate the United States because of the welfare state. On the topic of slavery, Limbaugh said, "If any race of people should not have guilt about slavery, it's Caucasians."

Limbaugh argued that liberal politicians have encouraged immigration from Latin America but have discouraged their assimilation to deliberately create racial inequality to manipulate as a voter base, and that their continued admission will cause a collapse of representative democracy and rule of law in the United States. He criticized the Immigration and Nationality Act of 1965 for this reason.

He said of the genocide of Native Americans, "Holocaust 90 million Indians? Only 4 million left? They all have casinos, what's to complain about?"

=== Taxes ===
James Fallows described Limbaugh's economic ideology as "a doctrinaire version of supply-side economics" and noted that he frequently cited The Wall Street Journal in his radio shows and books. Limbaugh has called for fewer taxes, including progressive taxes targeted towards the wealthy, and argued the wealthy were being taxed excessively because they continued to pay the majority of taxes in the United States. Limbaugh further claimed that reductions in marginal tax rates would reduce poverty and inequality by removing obstacles towards economic growth, and that reducing marginal tax rates on the wealthy would increase tax revenue by increasing production. Limbaugh credited Reagan's tax cuts for ending the early 1980s recession, and blamed the early 1990s recession and rising rates of inequality on the American middle-class being "taxed at a confiscatory rate".

=== LGBT and AIDS ===
Limbaugh expressed anti-LGBT views and viewed homosexual sexual practices as unhygienic. He made controversial statements about HIV/AIDS victims in the 1980s and 1990s, and called the virus "Rock Hudson's disease" and "the only federally-protected virus". For a time, Dionne Warwick's song "I'll Never Love This Way Again" preceded reports about people with HIV/AIDS on his radio show. These later became "condom updates", preceded by The 5th Dimension's song "Up, Up and Away". Limbaugh defended President Reagan's response to the HIV/AIDS epidemic and falsely claimed that AIDS did not "spread to the heterosexual community" in the United States. When Freddie Mercury died of complications from AIDS in 1991, Limbaugh played a snippet of "Another One Bites the Dust". In the early 1990s, Limbaugh ran a recurring segment, "AIDS Update", which mocked the deaths of gay individuals from HIV/AIDS, and read aloud the names of the dead. During the segment, he would play songs like "I'll Never Love This Way Again" and Johnny Lee's "Looking for Love in All the Wrong Places"; the Los Angeles Times reported that Limbaugh said, "Gays deserved their fate." Limbaugh later called the segment "the single most regretful thing I have ever done."

In 2013, Limbaugh commented on same-sex marriage by saying, "This issue is lost. I don't care what the Supreme Court does. This is inevitable. And it's inevitable because we lost the language on this. As far as I'm concerned, once we started talking about gay marriage, traditional marriage, opposite-sex marriage, same-sex marriage, hetero marriage, we lost. It was over." In 2016, Limbaugh described a program from the USDA for the LGBT community in rural America as, "I never knew that lesbians wanted to get behind the horse and the plow and start burrowing". In February 2020, Limbaugh predicted that Pete Buttigieg would not be able to win the 2020 presidential election because of his homosexuality.

=== Sexual consent ===
Limbaugh dismissed the concept of consent in sexual relations. He viewed consent as "the magic key to the left". In 2014, Limbaugh criticized a policy at Ohio State University encouraging students to obtain verbal consent, saying "How many of you guys ... have learned that 'no' means 'yes' if you know how to spot it?" The Democratic Congressional Campaign Committee used these statements to advocate a boycott of Limbaugh's show and advertisers, asserting that the statements were tantamount to an endorsement of sexual assault. Limbaugh denied this, and his spokesman Brian Glicklick and lawyer Patricia Glaser threatened a defamation lawsuit against the DCCC. According to spokesperson Emily Bittner, the DCCC did not receive any correspondence from Limbaugh or his attorney.

=== Drug policy ===
Limbaugh had been an outspoken critic of what he saw as leniency towards criminal drug use in the United States. On his television show on October 5, 1995, Limbaugh stated, "too many whites are getting away with drug use" and illegal drug trafficking. Limbaugh proposed that the racial disparity in drug enforcement could be fixed if authorities increased detection efforts, conviction rates and jail time for whites involved in illegal drugs. He defended mandatory-minimum sentencing as an effective tool against the crack cocaine epidemic of the 1980s. Limbaugh accused advocates of legalization of non-medical cannabis in the United States of hypocrisy due to their advocacy of tobacco control and backlash against electronic cigarettes, and compared the advocates for its legalization in Colorado to Big Tobacco. Limbaugh's past comments on drug users were highlighted by numerous media outlets after his own stint in a drug rehabilitation facility in 2003.

=== Environmental issues ===
Limbaugh was opposed to environmentalism and climate science. He rejected the relationship between CFCs and depletion of the ozone layer, claiming the scientific evidence did not support them. Limbaugh argued against the scientific consensus on climate change claiming it was "just a bunch of scientists organized around a political proposition" and argued that projections of climate change were the product of ideologically motivated computer simulations without the proper support of empirical data, a claim which has been widely debunked. Limbaugh used the term "environmentalist wacko" both when referring to left-leaning environmental advocates and when referring to more mainstream climate scientists and other environmental scientists and advocates with whom he disagreed. Limbaugh opposed pollution credits, including a carbon cap-and-trade system, as a way to disproportionately benefit major American investment banks, particularly Goldman Sachs, and claimed that it would destroy the American national economy.

Limbaugh wrote that "there are more acres of forestland in America today than when Columbus discovered the continent in 1492".

Limbaugh strongly opposed the proposed Green New Deal and its sponsor Alexandria Ocasio-Cortez.

=== Feminism ===
Limbaugh was critical of feminism, which he viewed as advancing only liberals and not women in general. In a newspaper column he stated that it "was established so that unattractive ugly broads could have easy access to the mainstream of society." He has criticized Democratic congressmen calling for more women in Congress as hypocritical due to their opposition to female Republican candidates. He has also regularly used the term "feminazi", described by The New York Times in 1994 as one of his "favorite epithets for supporters of women's rights". According to Limbaugh in 1992, for certain feminists, the "most important thing in life is ensuring that as many abortions as possible occur." He also used the term referring to the half-million-large 2017 Women's March as the "Deranged Feminazi March". He credited his friend Tom Hazlett, a professor of law and economics at George Mason University, with coining the term.

=== Abortion ===
For two weeks in 1989, on his Sacramento radio show, Limbaugh performed "caller abortions" where he would end a call suddenly to the sounds of a vacuum cleaner and a scream. He would then deny that he had "hung up" on the caller, which he had promised not to do. Limbaugh claims that he used this gag to illustrate "the tragedy of abortion" as well as to highlight the question of whether abortion constitutes murder. In 2013, Limbaugh said that women were being turned into "abortion machines" by the Democratic Party.

=== Middle East ===
Limbaugh was supportive of the Iraq War, and first suggested bombing Ba'athist Iraq in 2002 in revenge for the September 11 attacks. Even after no Iraqi weapons of mass destruction were found, he supported theories that they had existed. On the Abu Ghraib torture and prisoner abuse scandal, Limbaugh said, "This is no different than what happens at the Skull and Bones initiation ... And we're going to ruin people's lives over it and we're going to hamper our military effort, and then we are going to really hammer them because they had a good time." Speaking at the 2009 Conservative Political Action Conference, Limbaugh accused Democratic congressional leaders such as Harry Reid of deliberately undermining the war effort.

During the 2019–21 Persian Gulf crisis, Limbaugh praised the 2020 Baghdad International Airport drone strike that resulted in the death of the Islamic Revolutionary Guard Corps's commander Major General Qasem Soleimani, and accused opponents of the strike of supporting Iran over the United States. On January 6, 2020, during an interview with President Donald Trump on his show, Limbaugh commended him for the strike.

=== Trade ===
In 1993, Limbaugh supported the North American Free Trade Agreement (NAFTA), joking in response to claims that it would lead to a transfer of unskilled labor to Mexico that this would leave the United States with only better jobs. During a 1993 televised debate against H. Ross Perot over NAFTA, Vice President Al Gore complimented Limbaugh as one of the "distinguished Americans" who pushed NAFTA forward in spite of the intense animosity between Limbaugh and the administration of President Bill Clinton. He later became more critical of NAFTA and trade agreements in general, claiming that they had reduced national sovereignty by "subordinating" America to "world tribunals, like the World Trade Organization and the International Criminal Court and this kind of thing." He also claimed that promises to stem mass migration by invigorating the Latin American economy had failed. He supported a renegotiation of NAFTA and the eventual United States–Mexico–Canada Agreement.

Limbaugh defended the first Trump tariffs and the China–United States trade war as a legitimate response to predatory Chinese trade practices and its Communist command economy.

=== Barack Obama ===
Rush Limbaugh strongly opposed Barack Obama during the 2008 presidential election. In 2007, his show aired a song called "Barack the Magic Negro". Limbaugh spread false claims that Obama was a non-citizen not born in the United States. Limbaugh predicted that Obama would be unable to win the election. On January 16, 2009, Limbaugh commented on the then-upcoming Obama presidency, "I hope he fails." Limbaugh later said that he wanted to see Obama's policies fail, not the man himself. Limbaugh frequently referred to the Obama administration or presidency as regime or as the Obama regime, or even junta. Speaking of Obama, Limbaugh said, "He's my president, he's a human being, and his ideas and policies are what count for me." Limbaugh later discouraged efforts to impeach Barack Obama as politically unrealistic.

Limbaugh accused Obama of using his race to prevent criticism of his policies, and said he was successful in his first year in office only because conservative members of the 111th Congress feared accusations of racism. Limbaugh featured a recurring skit in which his colleague James Golden, who described himself as an "African-American-in-good-standing-and-certified-black-enough-to-criticize-Obama guy", appeared in a cameo as the "Official EIB Obama Criticizer".

Limbaugh blamed Obama's foreign policy, including the withdrawal of U.S. troops from Iraq, for allowing the rise of the Islamic State of Iraq and the Levant. Limbaugh also claimed that the 2012 Benghazi attack occurred due to a secret arms trafficking operation to the Syrian opposition authorized by Obama and coordinated by Ambassador J. Christopher Stevens, speculating that the 2016 Democratic National Committee email leak would reveal evidence of it. Limbaugh also criticized the Russian reset, viewing Vladimir Putin's rule in the Russian Federation as a thinly veiled continuation of the Soviet Union and Marxism–Leninism. He was also critical of the Joint Comprehensive Plan of Action, including of Obama's decision to ratify it as an executive agreement, and claimed that it was used as a pretext for surveillance against Obama's political opponents. Limbaugh argued that side agreements of the JCPOA limited transparency and would obligate the United States to militarily defend Iran against an Israeli offensive, including a preemptive strike to prevent nuclear weapons development.

During the West African Ebola virus epidemic, Limbaugh blamed Obama for allowing the spread of the disease to the United States in 2014, claiming that he should have stopped air travel to West Africa. He claimed that both the media and the government, including the Centers for Disease Control and Prevention, deliberately downplayed its symptoms, expressing skepticism over the scientific consensus that the disease could be spread only through contact with bodily fluids and was not aerosol transmissible. When David Quammen criticized the idea of ending air travel to West Africa by pointing out that Liberia was founded due to slavery in the United States on Anderson Cooper 360°, Limbaugh suggested in response that the Obama administration was deliberately allowing Ebola to be transmitted to the United States due to its guilt over slavery, stating "People at the highest levels of our government say 'Why, why shouldn't we get it? Why should only those three nations in Africa get it? We're no better than they are.' And they have this attitude, 'Well, if they have it in Africa, by God, we deserve to get it, because they're in Africa because of us and because of slavery.'"

Limbaugh claimed that the 2010 eruptions of Eyjafjallajökull were God's response to the Affordable Care Act being passed.

=== Relationship with Donald Trump ===
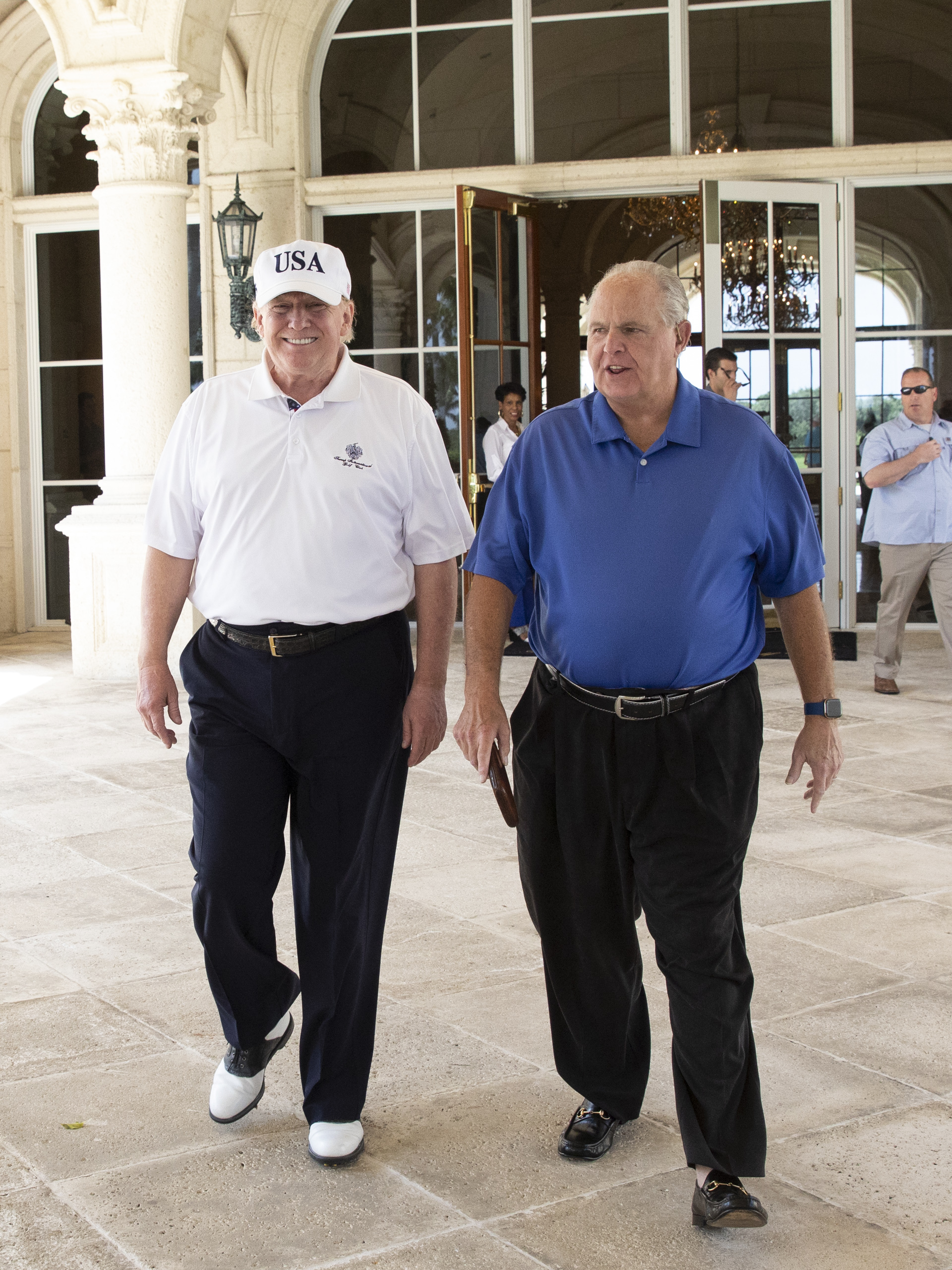
Limbaugh with President Donald Trump at the Trump International Golf Club in 2019

Limbaugh was consistently supportive of the candidacy and first presidency of Donald Trump, although he endorsed Ted Cruz during the 2016 Republican Party presidential primaries and took issue with Trump's treatment of Cruz. Limbaugh later criticized Cruz's hesitance to endorse Trump after his nomination at the 2016 Republican National Convention, comparing it to Ted Kennedy's lukewarm support of Jimmy Carter at the 1980 Democratic National Convention. After the election he became supportive of deep-state conspiracy theories, claiming that the United States had entered a "Cold Civil War" in which the Democratic Party was attempting to illegitimately overturn the election results and that it was part of a trend of Democrats contesting elections beginning with the 2000 Florida election recount intended to eventually eliminate free elections in the United States.

In December 2018, Limbaugh criticized Trump for preparing to accept a continuing resolution that would fund the government through February 8, 2019, but included no funding for a border wall on the Mexico–United States border, a campaign promise repeatedly emphasized by Trump. Trump would subsequently make a surprise telephone call to Limbaugh announcing his intent to veto the bill, a decision that would lead to the 2018–19 United States federal government shutdown. Limbaugh would go on to support the shutdown, stating, "We have a president keeping promises left and right. And isn't it interesting to see how trivial Washington thinks that is?" After Trump declared the National Emergency Concerning the Southern Border of the United States and the 116th Congress failed in its attempt to override it, Limbaugh called on him to completely close the border with Mexico.

Limbaugh was dismissive of controversies over links between Trump associates and Russian officials. He claimed that the FBI investigations of Michael Flynn and Paul Manafort, as well as the subsequent Special Counsel investigation directed by Robert Mueller, were orchestrated by Barack Obama and the Democratic Party to undermine the legitimacy of Trump's presidency, constituting an illegal coup d'état. Limbaugh claimed that George Papadopoulos was entrapped by the FBI, which he claimed Joseph Mifsud was an informant for, through Stefan Halper as part of an "insurance policy" against Trump's election by the Five Eyes intelligence alliance. Limbaugh advocated a full presidential pardon for all suspects indicted or convicted by the investigation. After the release of the Mueller report, he disputed its conclusion that WikiLeaks obtained the Democratic National Committee's emails from the Russian government and its depiction of Donald Trump Jr.'s Trump Tower meeting. He claimed that allegations of obstruction of justice were leveled at Trump due to the Report's conclusion that Trump did not directly collude with Russian officials, and that Trump's intent to fire Mueller and Attorney General Jeff Sessions was legitimate.

Limbaugh supported the Presidential Advisory Commission on Election Integrity as well as Trump's false claims that he lost the popular vote due to voter impersonation by illegal immigrants.

After the House of Representatives commenced a formal impeachment inquiry against President Trump due to the scandal over a 2019 telephone call to Ukrainian president Volodymyr Zelenskyy, pressuring the Ukrainian government to prosecute 2020 Democratic primary candidate Joe Biden shortly after a freeze of military aid, Limbaugh argued that the two events were unrelated since Trump had made a decision to withhold military funds a month in advance. He additionally claimed that Trump's desire for the Ukrainian government to prosecute Biden was legally justified by a 1999 mutual legal assistance treaty with Ukraine and "was following the law to the letter when it comes to unearthing the long-standing corruption that has swirled in Ukraine and allegedly involves powerful Democrats like Joe Biden."

=== Alleging false flag attacks ===
Limbaugh claimed that the October 2018 United States mail bombing attempts were perpetuated as a false flag operation to draw public attention away from Central American migrant caravans. He reiterated these claims two weeks after the arrest of the primary suspect Cesar Sayoc, a registered Republican.

On his show, Limbaugh said that the Christchurch mosque shootings of March 2019 may have been a false-flag operation. Limbaugh described "an ongoing theory" that the shooter was actually "a leftist" trying to smear the right. Despite providing no source or evidence, Limbaugh continued: "you can't immediately discount this. The left is this insane, they are this crazy."

== Controversies and inaccuracies ==
Comedian Al Franken, who later became a Senator, wrote a satirical 1996 book, Rush Limbaugh Is a Big Fat Idiot and Other Observations, in which he accused Limbaugh of distorting facts to serve his own political biases.

Of Limbaugh's controversial statements and allegations they have investigated, Politifact has rated 84% as ranging from "Mostly False" to "Pants On Fire" (signifying false statements that cannot be reasonably assessed as merely errors), with 5% of Limbaugh's contested statements rising to the level of "Mostly True" and 0% rated "True". These debunked allegations by Limbaugh include suggestions that the existence of gorillas disproves the theory of evolution, that Ted Kennedy sent a letter to Soviet General Secretary Yuri Andropov seeking to undercut President Reagan, that a recent lack of hurricanes disproves climate change, and that President Obama wanted to mandate circumcision.

=== Hu Jintao ===
Limbaugh was heavily criticized for mocking Hu Jintao, then the General Secretary of the Chinese Communist Party and paramount leader of the People's Republic of China, and the Chinese language during an episode. After proceeding to label Hu as a "Chicom dictator", Limbaugh mocked the Chinese language, primarily using words like ching chong.

=== Joseph Kony ===
On October 14, 2011, Limbaugh questioned the U.S. Armed Forces initiative against Joseph Kony and his Lord's Resistance Army (LRA), based on the assumption that they were Christians. "They are fighting the Muslims in Sudan. And Obama has sent troops, United States troops to remove them from the battlefield, which means kill them." Upon learning about the accusations leveled against Kony, which included kidnapping whole schools of young children for use as child soldiers, Limbaugh stated that he would research the group.

=== Deepwater Horizon ===
In 2010, after the Deepwater Horizon oil spill in the Gulf of Mexico, Limbaugh speculated on his show that eco-terrorists deliberately destroyed the oil well to justify President Obama's deepwater drilling moratorium.

=== Unite the Right ===
After the white supremacist Unite the Right rally, in which a counter-protester was murdered in the Charlottesville car attack, Limbaugh claimed that the violence had been provoked by Black Lives Matter activists, Antifa, and Robert Creamer. He also claimed without evidence that the police response had been deliberately restrained by Terry McAuliffe as a botched attempt to start a presidential bid in the 2020 Democratic Party presidential primaries, and that it was part of a campaign by "international financiers" such as George Soros to start a Second American Civil War to remove its status as a global superpower.

=== Chelsea Clinton ===
During the Clinton administration, while taping his television program, Limbaugh referred to media coverage of Socks, the Clintons' cat. He then stated, "But did you know there is also a White House dog?" and presented a picture of Chelsea Clinton who was 13 years old at the time.

=== Michael J. Fox ===
In October 2006, Limbaugh said Michael J. Fox, who has Parkinson's disease, had exaggerated the effects of his disability in a political TV advertisement advocating for funding of stem cell research. Limbaugh said that Fox in the ad had been "shameless" in "moving all around and shaking", and that Fox had not taken "his medication or he's acting, one of the two". Fox said "the irony of it is I was too medicated", adding that there was no way to predict how his symptoms would manifest. Limbaugh said he would apologize to Fox "bigly, hugely ... if I am wrong in characterizing his behavior on this commercial as an act." In 2012, Fox said Limbaugh in 2006 had acted on "bullying instincts" when "he said I faked it. I didn't fake it.", and said Limbaugh's goal was to have him marginalized and shut down for his stem cell stance.

=== Phony soldiers ===
In 2007, Media Matters reported that Limbaugh had categorized Iraq War veterans opposed to the war as "the phony soldiers". Limbaugh later said that he was speaking of Jesse MacBeth, a soldier who falsely claimed to have been decorated for valor but, in fact, had never seen combat. Limbaugh said Media Matters was trying to smear him with out-of-context and selectively edited comments. After Limbaugh published what he claimed was the entire transcript of phony soldiers discussion, Media Matters said that over a minute and 30 seconds of the transcript was omitted without "notation or ellipsis to indicate that there is, in fact, a break in the transcript." Limbaugh said during the minute and a half gap Media Matters had pointed out, he was waiting for relevant ABC News copy on the topic, and the transcript and audio edits were "for space and relevance reasons, not to hide anything." Senator Harry Reid and 41 Democrats, including Hillary Clinton, signed a letter asking the CEO of Clear Channel to denounce Limbaugh. Instead, the executive gave the letter to Limbaugh to auction. It raised $2.1 million, at the time an eBay record for an auction item for charity. Limbaugh said he would match the donation and give it to the Marine Corps-Law Enforcement Foundation.

=== Bid for ownership of the Rams ===
The NFL team moved to St. Louis, Missouri, and Limbaugh wanted to be a partial owner, but in October 2009, the group that planned to buy the Rams, dropped him. Limbaugh blamed Al Sharpton and Jesse Jackson, among others, for his bid failure.

=== Sandra Fluke ===
On February 29, 2012, Limbaugh, while talking about contraceptive mandates, included remarks about law student Sandra Fluke as a "slut" and "prostitute". Limbaugh was commenting on Fluke's speech the previous week to House Democrats in support of mandating insurance coverage for contraceptives. Limbaugh made numerous similar statements over the next two days, leading to the loss of 45 to "more than 100" local and national sponsors and Limbaugh's apology on his show for some of his comments. Susan MacMillan Emry co-organized a public relations campaign called Rock the Slut Vote as a response to Limbaugh's remarks.

=== COVID-19 pandemic in the United States ===
During the COVID-19 pandemic in the United States, Limbaugh asserted that the virus was the common cold. Limbaugh said on his radio show on February 24, 2020, "I'm dead right on this. The coronavirus is the common cold, folks," alleging it was being "weaponized" to bring down Trump. Limbaugh's statement was called "wildly irresponsible" by The Washington Post.

== Charitable work ==
=== Leukemia and lymphoma telethon ===
From 1990 until his death, Limbaugh held an annual fundraising telethon called the "EIB Cure-a-Thon" for the Leukemia and Lymphoma Society. In 2006, the EIB Cure-a-Thon conducted its 16th annual telethon, raising $1.7 million, totaling over $15 million since the first cure-a-thon. According to Leukemia and Lymphoma Society annual reports, Limbaugh personally contributed between $100,000 and $499,999 from 2000 to 2005 and in 2007, and Limbaugh said that he contributed around $250,000 in 2003, 2004, and 2005. The Society's 2006 annual report placed him in the $500,000 to $999,999 category. Limbaugh donated $320,000 during the 2007 Cure-a-Thon, which the Leukemia and Lymphoma Society reported had raised $3.1 million. On his radio program April 18, 2008, Limbaugh pledged $400,000 to the Leukemia and Lymphoma Society after being challenged by two listeners to increase his initial pledge of $300,000.

=== Marine Corps–Law Enforcement Foundation ===
Limbaugh conducted an annual drive to help the Marine Corps–Law Enforcement Foundation collect contributions to provide scholarships for children of Marines and law enforcement officers and agents who have died in the line of duty. The foundation was the beneficiary of a record $2.1 million eBay auction in October 2007 after Limbaugh listed for sale a letter critical of him signed by 41 Democratic senators; he pledged to match the selling price. With the founding of his and his wife's company Two if by Tea, they pledged to donate at least $100,000 to the MC–LEF beginning in June 2011.

=== Tunnel to Towers Foundation ===
In July 2019, Nike announced a special Fourth of July edition of their Air Max 1 Quick Strike sneaker that featured the thirteen-star Betsy Ross flag. The company withdrew the sneaker after their spokesman Colin Kaepernick raised concerns that the symbol represented an era of black enslavement. In response Limbaugh's radio program introduced a t-shirt imprinted "Stand up for Betsy Ross" with sale proceeds to benefit the Tunnel to Towers Foundation. As of December 2019, the sales have earned over US$5 million for the foundation.

== Published works ==
In 1992, Limbaugh published his first book, The Way Things Ought to Be, followed by See, I Told You So, the following year. Both titles were number one on The New York Times Best Seller list for 24 weeks. His first book was dictated by himself, and transcribed and edited by Wall Street Journal writer John Fund.

In 2013, Limbaugh authored his first children's book, entitled Rush Revere and the Brave Pilgrims: Time-Travel with Exceptional Americans. He received the Author of the Year Award from the Children's Book Council for this work. Limbaugh's second children's book was released the following year, entitled Rush Revere and the First Patriots: Time-Travel with Exceptional Americans. This book was nominated as an author-of-the year finalist for the annual Children's and Teen Choice Book Awards. Limbaugh's third children's book was released later this same year, written with his wife Kathryn and entitled Rush Revere and the American Revolution. The Limbaughs dedicated this to the U.S. military and their families.

- The Way Things Ought to Be, Pocket Books, October 1, 1992, ISBN 978-0671751456
- See I Told You So, November 1, 1993, Atria, ISBN 978-0671871208
- Rush Revere and the Brave Pilgrims: Time-Travel Adventures With Exceptional Americans, Threshold Editions, October 29, 2013, ISBN 978-1476755861
- Rush Revere and the First Patriots: Time-Travel Adventures With Exceptional Americans, Threshold Editions, March 11, 2014, ISBN 978-1476755885
- Rush Revere and the American Revolution: Time-Travel Adventures With Exceptional Americans, Threshold Editions, October 28, 2014, ISBN 978-1476789873
- Rush Revere and the Star-Spangled Banner: Time-Travel Adventures With Exceptional Americans, Threshold Editions, October 27, 2015, ISBN 978-1476789880
- Rush Revere and the Presidency: Time-Travel Adventures With Exceptional Americans, Threshold Editions, November 22, 2016, ISBN 978-1501156892
- Radio's Greatest of All Time, Threshold Editions, October 25, 2022, ISBN 978-1668001844

== Personal life ==
Limbaugh was raised and considered himself a Methodist.

He was married four times and divorced three times. He did not have any children. He was first married at the age of 26 to Roxy Maxine McNeely, a sales secretary at radio station WHB in Kansas City, Missouri. The couple married at the Centenary United Methodist Church in Limbaugh's hometown of Cape Girardeau on September 24, 1977. McNeely filed for divorce in March 1980, citing "incompatibility". They were formally divorced on July 10, 1980.

In 1983, Limbaugh married Michelle Sixta, a college student and usherette at the Kansas City Royals Stadium Club. They divorced in 1990, and she remarried the following year.

On May 27, 1994, Limbaugh married Marta Fitzgerald, a 35-year-old aerobics instructor whom he met on the online service CompuServe in 1990. They married at the house of U.S. Supreme Court Justice Clarence Thomas, who officiated. The couple separated on June 11, 2004. Limbaugh announced his divorce on the air. It was finalized in December 2004. In September 2004, Limbaugh became romantically involved with then-CNN news anchor Daryn Kagan; the relationship ended in February 2006.

Limbaugh lived in Palm Beach from 1996 until his death in 2021. A friend recalls that Limbaugh "fell in love with Palm Beach ... after visiting her over Memorial Day weekend in 1995."

He dated Kathryn Rogers, a party planner from Florida, for three years; the couple married on June 5, 2010. At the wedding reception following the ceremony, Elton John entertained the wedding guests for a reported $1 million fee; however, Limbaugh denied that the $1 million figure was accurate on his September 7, 2010, radio show.

Through a holding company, KARHL Holdings (KARHL meaning "Kathryn and Rush Hudson Limbaugh"), Limbaugh launched a line of bottled iced tea beverages in 2011. The brand name "Two if by Tea" was a play on the line from Henry Wadsworth Longfellow's "Paul Revere's Ride", "one if by land, two if by sea". Production of the tea was put on hold in 2018 with a statement that "Due to rising manufacturing and shipping costs, we did not feel it was right to pass this on to our customers.".

=== Prescription drug addiction ===
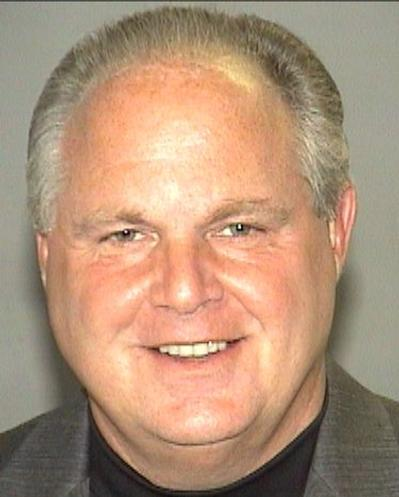
Mugshot of Limbaugh in 2006

On October 3, 2003, the National Enquirer reported that Limbaugh was being investigated for illegally obtaining the prescription drugs oxycodone and hydrocodone. Other news outlets quickly confirmed the investigation. He admitted to listeners on his radio show on October 10, 2003, that he was addicted to prescription painkillers and stated that he would enter inpatient treatment for 30 days, immediately after the broadcast. Limbaugh stated his addiction to painkillers resulted from several years of severe back pain heightened by a botched surgery intended to correct those problems.

A subsequent investigation into whether Limbaugh had violated Florida's doctor shopping laws was launched by the Palm Beach State Attorney, which raised privacy issues when investigators seized Limbaugh's private medical records looking for evidence of crimes. Roy Black, one of Limbaugh's attorneys, stated that "Rush Limbaugh was singled out for prosecution because of who he is. We believe the state attorney's office is applying a double standard." On November 9, 2005, following two years of investigations, Assistant State Attorney James L. Martz requested that the court set aside Limbaugh's doctor–patient confidentiality rights and allow the state to question his physicians. Limbaugh's attorney opposed the prosecutor's efforts to interview his doctors on the basis of patient privacy rights, and argued that the prosecutor had violated Limbaugh's Fourth Amendment rights by illegally seizing his medical records. The American Civil Liberties Union issued a statement in agreement and filed an amicus curiae brief in support of Limbaugh. On December 12, 2005, Judge David F. Crow delivered a ruling prohibiting the State of Florida from questioning Limbaugh's physicians about "the medical condition of the patient and any information disclosed to the health care practitioner by the patient in the course of the care and treatment of the patient."

On April 28, 2006, a warrant was issued for his arrest on the charge of doctor shopping. According to Teri Barbera, spokeswoman for the sheriff, during his arrest, Limbaugh was booked, photographed, and fingerprinted, but not handcuffed. He was then released after about an hour on $3,000 bail. After his surrender, he filed a "not guilty" plea to the charge. Prosecutors explained that the charges were brought after they discovered he received about 2,000 painkillers, prescribed by four doctors in six months, at a pharmacy near his Palm Beach mansion. In 2009, after three years of prolonged discussion regarding a settlement, prosecutors agreed to drop the charge if Limbaugh paid $30,000 to defray the cost of the investigation, completed an 18-month therapy regimen with his physician, submitted to random drug testing, and gave up his right to own a firearm for eighteen months. Limbaugh agreed to the settlement, though he continued to maintain his innocence of doctor shopping and asserted that the state's offer resulted from a lack of evidence supporting the charge.

Before his addiction became known, Limbaugh had condemned illegal drug use on his television program, stating that "Drug use, some might say, is destroying this country ... And so if people are violating the law by doing drugs, they ought to be accused and they ought to be convicted and they ought to be sent up."

=== Viagra incident ===
In June 2006, Limbaugh was detained by drug enforcement agents at Palm Beach International Airport. Customs officials confiscated Viagra from Limbaugh's luggage as he was returning from the Dominican Republic. The prescription was not in Limbaugh's name. After he was released with no charges filed, Limbaugh joked about the incident on his radio show, claiming that he got the Viagra at the Clinton Library and was told they were blue M&M's. He also stated that "I had a great time in the Dominican Republic. Wish I could tell you about it."

=== Health problems and death ===
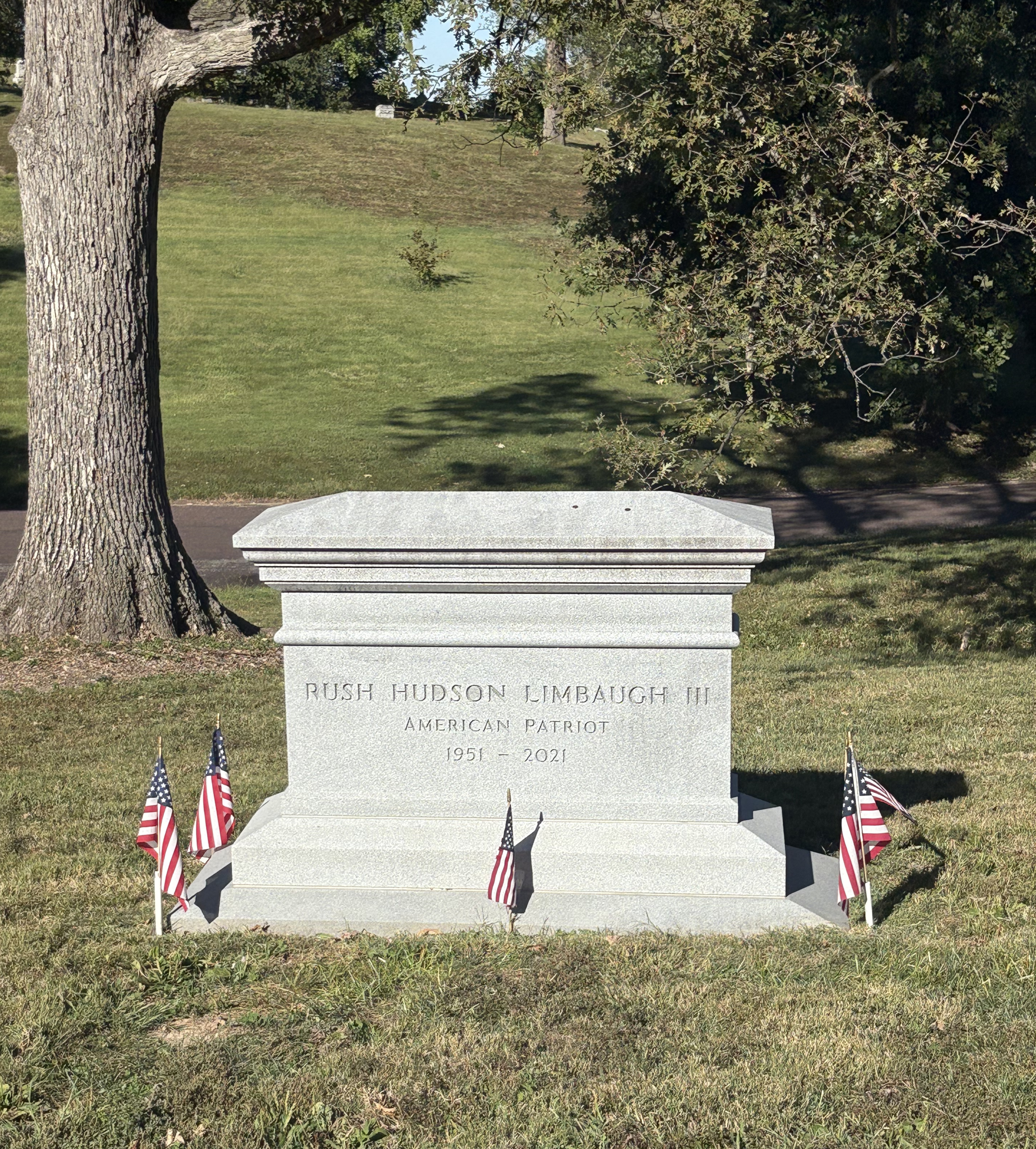
Limbaugh's grave at Bellefontaine Cemetery

Limbaugh described himself as being "100 percent, totally deaf". In 2001, he announced that he had lost most of his ability to hear: "I cannot hear television. I cannot hear music. I am, for all practical purposes, deaf – and it's happened in three months." He said that the condition was not genetic. On December 19, 2001, doctors at the House Ear Clinic in Los Angeles were able to successfully restore a measure of his hearing through cochlear implant surgery. Limbaugh received a Clarion CII Bionic Ear.

When questioned whether Limbaugh's sudden hearing loss was caused by his addiction to opioids, his cochlear implant doctor, otolaryngologist Jennifer Derebery, said that it was possible, but that there is no way to know for sure without performing tests that would destroy Limbaugh's hearing completely. "We don't know why some people, but apparently not most, who take large doses may lose their hearing."

In 2005, Limbaugh was forced to undergo "tuning" due to an "eye twitch", an apparent side-effect of cochlear implants.

On December 30, 2009, while vacationing in Honolulu, Hawaii, Limbaugh was admitted to Queen's Medical Center with intense chest pains. His doctors attributed the pain to angina pectoris.

On April 8, 2014, on his radio program, Limbaugh announced his decision to 'go bilateral'. "I'm going to get an implant on the right side", he said. After bilateral tuning, there was a 100% improvement. "Coming from total deafness, it is miraculous! How can you not believe in God?", Limbaugh said in his national daily broadcast.

Limbaugh, a cigar and former cigarette smoker, was diagnosed with advanced lung cancer on January 20, 2020, after first experiencing shortness of breath on January 12. He had previously downplayed the link between smoking and cancer deaths, arguing that it "takes 50 years to kill people, if it does." He announced his diagnosis during his radio show on February 3. He advised he would miss airtime to undergo treatment, and that he would try to continue the program "as normally and competently" as he could. On October 20, 2020, Limbaugh announced that treatment had been ineffectual at containing the cancer, that his diagnosis was terminal, and that he had been given a time frame on when he should expect to die. In his final broadcast of 2020, he said "I wasn't expected to make it to October, and then to November, and then to December. And yet, here I am, and today, got some problems, but I'm feeling pretty good today."

Limbaugh made his last radio broadcast on February 2, 2021. He died on February 17, at the age of 70. According to his wife, Kathryn Rogers Limbaugh, his death was attributed to complications of his lung cancer. Governor Ron DeSantis directed flags in the state of Florida be lowered to half-staff on the date of his interment. Limbaugh was interred at the Bellefontaine Cemetery in St. Louis, Missouri.

== Influence and legacy ==
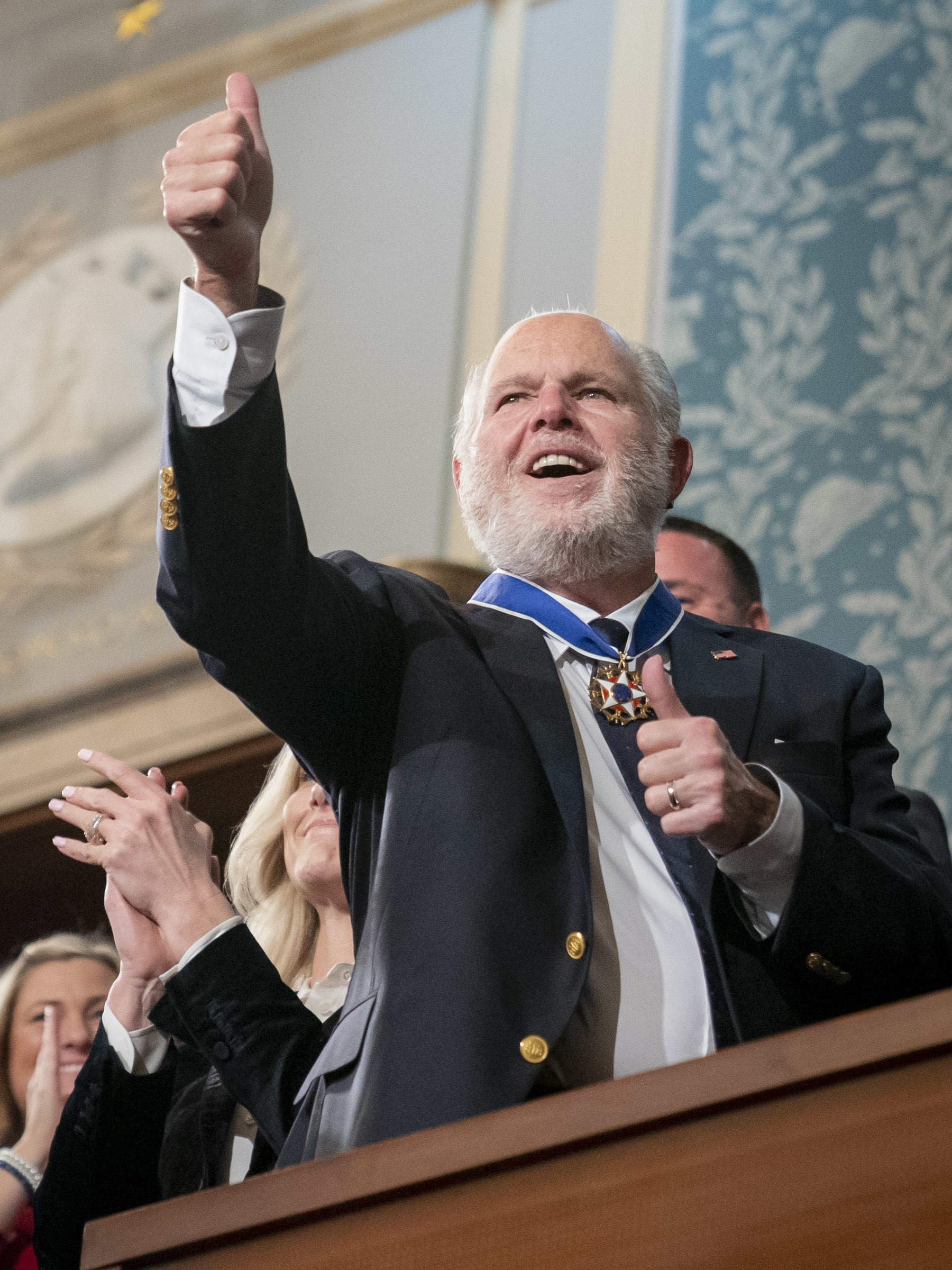
Limbaugh after being awarded the Presidential Medal of Freedom in 2020

Limbaugh was widely recognized as one of the leading voices of the conservative movement in the United States, beginning in the 1990s. Former president Ronald Reagan thanked him in a 1992 letter, giving him credit "for all you're doing to promote Republican and conservative principles ... [and] you have become the Number One voice for conservatism in our Country." In 1994, Republicans in the U.S. House of Representatives made Limbaugh an honorary member.

From 1994, Limbaugh was parodied on The Simpsons with the character of Birch Barlow, a conservative radio talk show host and Fox News presenter.

In 1995, Limbaugh was profiled on the PBS series Frontline in a one-hour documentary called "Rush Limbaugh's America". Limbaugh refused to be interviewed, but his mother, brother, and many Republican supporters took part, as well as critics and opponents.

By the 1990s, Limbaugh had become known for his love of cigars, saying, "I think cigars are just a tremendous addition to the enjoyment of life." During his syndicated television program from 1992 to 1996, he also became known for wearing distinctive neckties. In response to viewer interest, Limbaugh launched a series of ties designed primarily by his then-wife Marta.

Limbaugh was awarded the Marconi Radio Award for Syndicated Radio Personality of the Year by the National Association of Broadcasters five times: 1992, 1995, 2000, 2005, and 2014. He was inducted into the National Radio Hall of Fame in 1993 and the National Association of Broadcasters Hall of Fame in 1998. By 2001, he signed a US$285 million contract for eight years, which was renewed in 2008 for another eight years at $400 million. By 2017, Limbaugh was the second-highest-paid radio host in the United States, earning an annual salary of $84 million, second only to Howard Stern. In 2002, Talkers Magazine ranked him as the greatest-ever radio talk show host; in 2017, he was the most-listened-to radio host in the United States, with 14 million listeners. Limbaugh is given much of the credit for having revived AM radio at a time when most people had switched to FM.

Conservative magazine Human Events announced Limbaugh as their 2007 Man of the Year. Later that same year, Barbara Walters featured Limbaugh as one of the most fascinating people of the year in a special that aired on December 4, 2008.

On February 28, 2009, following his self-described "first address to the nation" lasting 90 minutes, carried live on CNN and Fox News and recorded for C-SPAN, Limbaugh received CPAC's "Defender of the Constitution Award", a document signed by Benjamin Franklin, given to someone "who has stood up for the First Amendment ... Rush Limbaugh is for America, exactly what Benjamin Franklin did for the Founding Fathers ... the only way we will be successful is if we listen to Rush Limbaugh", reads the citation.

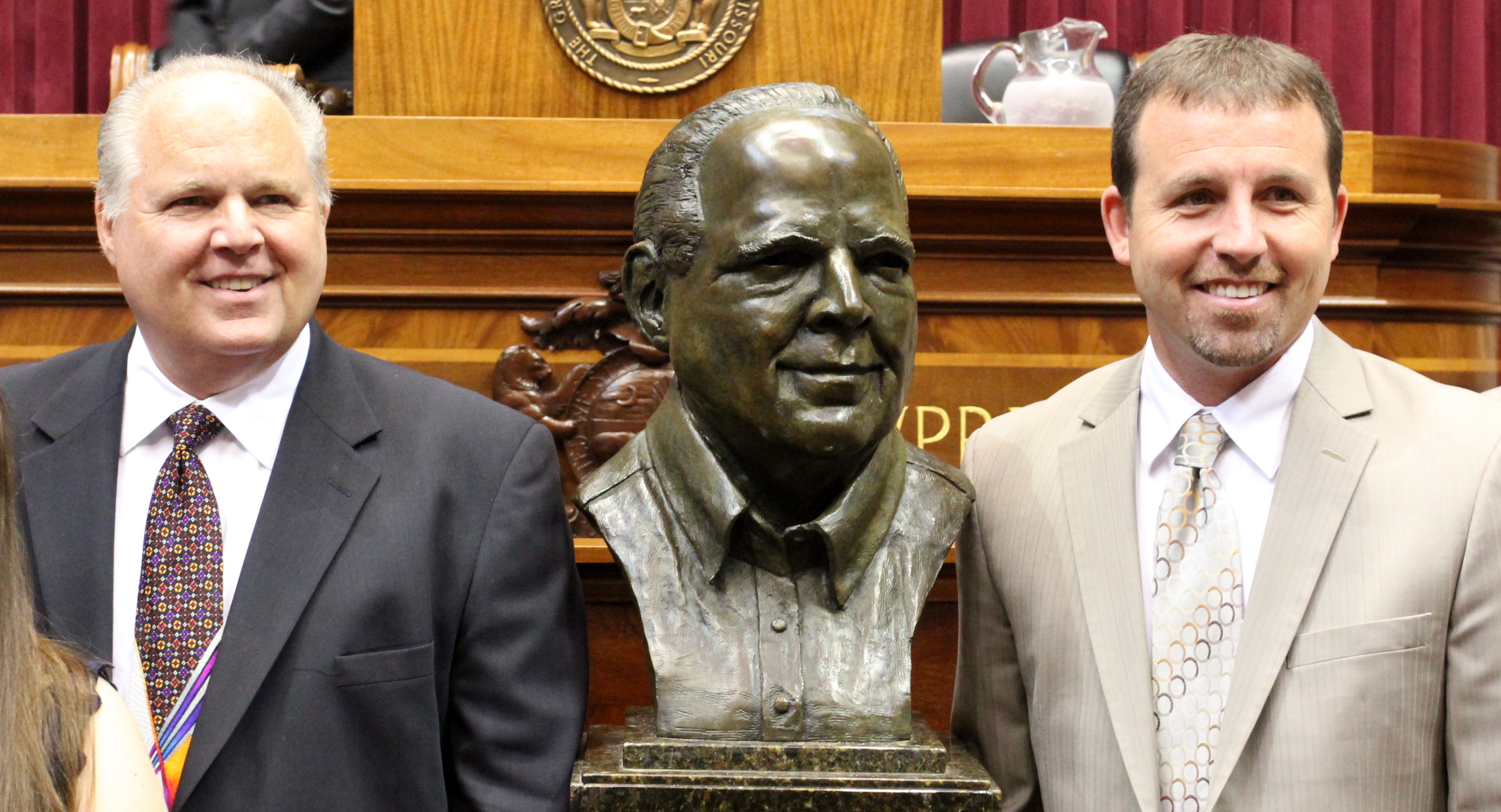
Limbaugh (left) next to his bust at the Hall of Famous Missourians in 2012

In his 2010 book, Rush Limbaugh: An Army of One, Ze'ev Chafets cited Limbaugh as "the brains and the spirit behind" the Republican Party's resurgence in the 2010 midterm elections in the wake of the election of President Obama. Chafets pointed, among others, to Sen. Arlen Specter's defeat, after being labeled by Limbaugh as a "Republican in Name Only", and to Sarah Palin, whose "biggest current applause line – Republicans are not just the party of no, but the party of hell no – came courtesy of Mr. Limbaugh." The author continued with ..."Limbaugh has argued the 'party-of-no' conservative course for the Republicans vigorously, notably since six weeks after Obama's inauguration, and has been fundamental to, and encouraging to, the more prominently noted Tea Party movement".

Rush Limbaugh was inducted into the Hall of Famous Missourians on May 14, 2012, in a secret ceremony announced only 20 minutes before it began in order to prevent negative media attention. A bronze bust of Limbaugh is on display at the Missouri State Capitol building in Jefferson City, along with 40 other awardees. Limbaugh's bust includes a security camera to prevent vandalism.

On February 4, 2020, the day after he announced that he had advanced lung cancer, Limbaugh was a guest of President Donald Trump at the 2020 State of the Union Address, where he was presented with the Presidential Medal of Freedom by Melania Trump.

== Select bibliography ==
- Limbaugh, Rush (1992). The Way Things Ought to Be. New York City: Pocket Books. ISBN 0-671-75145-X.
- Limbaugh, Rush (1993). See, I Told You So. New York City: Pocket Books. ISBN 0-671-87120-X.
- Limbaugh, Rush (2013). Rush Revere and the Brave Pilgrims. New York City: Threshold Editions. ISBN 978-1-4767-5586-1.
- Limbaugh, Rush (2014). Rush Revere and the First Patriots. New York City: Threshold Editions. ISBN 978-1-4767-5588-5.
- Limbaugh, Rush (2014). Rush Revere and the American Revolution. New York City: Threshold Editions. ISBN 978-1-4767-8987-3.
- Limbaugh, Rush (2015). Rush Revere and the Star-Spangled Banner. New York City: Threshold Editions. ISBN 978-1-4767-8988-0.
- Limbaugh, Rush (2016). Rush Revere and the Presidency. New York City: Threshold Editions. ISBN 978-1-5011-5689-2.
