= Contraceptive mandate =

Requirement of health insurance for contraceptive costs

A contraceptive mandate is a government regulation or law that requires health insurers, or employers that provide their employees with health insurance, to cover some contraceptive costs in their health insurance plans.

In 1978, the United States Congress prescribed that discrimination on the basis of pregnancy was discrimination on the basis of sex. In 2000, the Equal Employment Opportunity Commission ruled that companies that provided insurance for prescription drugs to their employees but excluded birth control were violating the Civil Rights Act of 1964. President Obama signed the Patient Protection and Affordable Care Act (ACA) on 23 March 2010. As of 1 August 2011, female contraception was added to a list of preventive services covered by the ACA that would be provided without patient co-payment. The federal mandate applied to all new health insurance plans in all states from 1 August 2012.

Grandfathered plans did not have to comply unless they changed substantially. To be grandfathered, a group plan must have existed or an individual plan must have been sold before President Obama signed the law; otherwise they were required to comply with the new law. The Guttmacher Institute said that even before the federal mandate was implemented, twenty-eight states had their own mandates that required health insurance to cover prescription contraceptives, but the federal mandate innovated by forbidding insurance companies from charging part of the cost to the patient. In 2017, the Trump administration issued a ruling letting insurers and employers refuse to provide birth control if doing so would violate their religious beliefs or moral convictions.

== Federal female contraception mandate before ACA ==
Certain aspects of the contraception mandate did not start with the ACA. In December 2000, the Equal Employment Opportunity Commission ruled that companies that provided prescription drugs to their employees but didn't provide birth control were in violation of Title VII of the 1964 Civil Rights Act, which prevents discrimination on the basis of sex. It applies to all employers with 15 or more employees.

After the EEOC opinion was approved in 2000, reproductive rights groups and employees who wanted birth control access sued employers that refused to comply. The next year, in Erickson v. Bartell Drug Co., a federal court agreed with the EEOC's reasoning. Reproductive rights groups and others used that decision as leverage to force other companies to settle lawsuits and agree to change their insurance plans to include birth control. Some subsequent court decisions echoed Erickson, and some went the other way, but the rule (absent a Supreme Court decision) remained, and over the following decade, the percentage of employer-based plans offering contraceptive coverage tripled to 90%.

In 1978, the U.S. Congress made it clear that discrimination on the basis of pregnancy was discrimination on the basis of sex. In 2000, the Equal Employment Opportunity Commission ruled that companies that provided insurance for prescription drugs to their employees but excluded birth control were violating the Civil Rights Act of 1964. President Obama signed the Patient Protection and Affordable Care Act (ACA) on 23 March 2010. As of 1 August 2011, contraception was added by HHS regulation to a list of preventive services covered by the ACA per regulation that would be provided without patient co-payment. The federal mandate applies to all new health insurance plans in all states from 1 August 2012. Grandfathered plans do not have to comply unless they change substantially. To be grandfathered, a group plan must have existed or an individual plan must have been sold before President Obama signed the law; otherwise they must comply with the new law. The Guttmacher Institute noted that even before the federal mandate was implemented, 28 states had their own mandates that required health insurance to cover the prescription contraceptives, but the federal mandate innovated by forbidding insurance companies from charging part of the cost to the patient.

== ACA mandatory coverage for contraceptives ==
With the exception of churches and houses of worship, the Patient Protection and Affordable Care Act mandates female contraceptive coverage for all employers and educational institutions, even though the mandate itself is not included in the wording of the law(s) passed by Congress. The mandate applies to all new health insurance plans effective August 2012. It controversially includes Christian hospitals, Christian charities, Catholic universities, and other enterprises owned or controlled by religious organizations that oppose contraception on doctrinal grounds.

On January 20, 2012, U.S. Department of Health and Human Services Secretary Kathleen Sebelius announced a (then) final rule of an August 1, 2011 interim final rule on health insurance coverage with no cost sharing for FDA-approved contraceptives and contraceptive services (including female sterilization) for women of reproductive age if prescribed by health care providers, as part of women's preventive health services guidelines adopted by the Health Resources and Services Administration (HRSA) for the Affordable Care Act. Male contraception is not eligible.

Regulations made under the act rely on the recommendations of the independent Institute of Medicine (IOM) in its July 19, 2011 report Clinical Preventive Services for Women: Closing the Gaps, which concluded that birth control is medically necessary "to ensure women's health and well-being".

The administration allowed a religious exemption. The exemption initially applied to church organizations themselves, but not to affiliated nonprofit corporations, like hospitals, that do not rely primarily on members of the faith as employees. An amendment, the Blunt Amendment, was proposed that "would have allowed employers to refuse to include contraception in health care coverage if it violated their religious or moral beliefs", but it was voted down 51–48 by the U.S. Senate on March 1, 2012.

In May 2015 the Obama administration stated that under the ACA, at least one form of all 18 FDA-approved methods of birth control for women must be covered without cost-sharing. These 18 methods include: sterilization surgery, surgical sterilization implant, implantable rod, copper intrauterine device, IUDs with progestin (a hormone), shot/injection, oral contraceptives (the pill), with estrogen and progestin, oral contraceptives with progestin only, oral contraceptives, known as extended or continuous use that delay menstruation, the patch, vaginal contraceptive ring, diaphragm, sponge, cervical cap, female condom, spermicide, emergency contraception (Plan B/morning-after pill), and emergency contraception (a different pill called Ella). All forms of male birth control are exempt from mandatory coverage under the ACA and the "ObamaCare Facts" page explicitly states that "Plans aren't required to cover services related to a man's reproductive capacity, like vasectomies."

=== Opposition to contraceptive mandate ===
In February 2012, a major political controversy erupted with candidates for the Republican nomination for President viewing the regulations as a "direct attack on religious liberty". The United States Conference of Catholic Bishops has since taken the lead in opposition to the regulations. Cardinal Timothy M. Dolan, the archbishop of New York and president of the United States Conference of Catholic Bishops, stated that the provision "represents a challenge and a compromise of our religious liberty". The regulations issued under the act are also opposed by active Christian Evangelicals. Other organizations, such as Planned Parenthood, supported the provision.

=== Obama administration opt-out proposal ===
In response to the criticism, the Obama administration proposed changes under which birth control medication would be provided by the insurers without direct involvement by the religious organization. Regulations were issued on March 16, 2012, for employees of enterprises controlled by religious institutions which self insure. Further regulations were issued on March 16, 2012, which require coverage for students at institutions controlled by religious organizations which purchase insurance. It is believed by the federal government that it is not possible under current law to require contraceptive coverage for students at institutions controlled by religious organizations which self insure.

=== Response to opt-out regulations ===
The Catholic Health Association (CHA) accepted this compromise. Although initially more supportive, Sister Carol Keehan, CEO of the CHA, registered opposition in a five-page letter to the U.S. Department of Health and Human Services. The vice president of Catholic identity and mission at Mount St. Mary's University, Stuart Swetland, said, "It shows [Obama] and the administration are listening to our concerns", but reserved the right to "examine the details". However, the United States Conference of Catholic Bishops continued to oppose the regulation, saying that the regulation still requires Catholics in the insurance industry to violate their consciences. Catholic opinion is split with a New York Times/CBS News poll showing 57% support of the regulations among Catholic voters and about the same by non-Catholics.

In June 2013, the Tenth Circuit Court of Appeals allowed a lawsuit against the mandate by arts and crafts retailer Hobby Lobby to proceed. The Green family objected to contraceptives which they believe may prevent implantation of a fertilized egg, which, according to pro-life advocacy organizations, include the emergency contraceptives Plan B (levonorgestrel), ella (ulipristal acetate), and copper IUDs. In July 2013, the Third Circuit denied a preliminary injunction requested by Conestoga Wood Specialties Corporation, a cabinet manufacturing company owned by a Mennonite family, requesting an exemption from the mandate on religious grounds. Both of these rulings were appealed to the Supreme Court, which granted certiorari on the consolidated cases to resolve the split. Another decision by the Sixth Circuit in a similar case had been appealed to the Supreme Court, and was being held pending the court's decision in the other two cases.

As of January 2014, at least 28 states in the US have contraceptive mandates; however, 20 of them allow some exceptions; four of those attempt to bridge the gap by letting employees buy coverage at the group rate.

=== Supreme Court review ===
A number of challenges to the contraceptive mandate have been brought to the Supreme Court by different types of organizations.

==== Closely held for-profit corporations ====
On June 30, 2014, the Supreme Court ruled 5 to 4 in Burwell v. Hobby Lobby that under the Religious Freedom Restoration Act (RFRA), closely held for-profit corporations are exempt from the contraceptive mandate, if they object on religious grounds, because the accommodation offered to objecting non-profits would be a less restrictive way to achieve the ACA's interest. Justice Anthony Kennedy, one of the majority justices, wrote in a concurring opinion that the government "makes the case that the mandate serves the Government's compelling interest in providing insurance coverage that is necessary to protect the health of female employees", but that the RFRA's least-restrictive way requirement was not met because "there is an existing, recognized, workable, and already-implemented framework to provide coverage", the non-profit accommodation.

==== Religious institutions ====
On February 15, 2012, Priests for Life v. HHS was filed in the U.S. District Court for the Eastern District of New York challenging the constitutionality of the contraceptive mandate on behalf of Priests for Life, a national Catholic pro-life organization that was based in New York City, but is now headquartered in Titusville, Florida. The case was dismissed by U.S. District Court Judge Frederic Block for lack of ripeness because the new compromise regulations were not yet finalized. On November 6, 2015, the Supreme Court of the United States decided to review the case combined with 6 other similar challenges to the contraceptive mandate. The case is titled Zubik v. Burwell and the six other challenges include Priests for Life v. Burwell, Southern Nazarene University v. Burwell, Geneva College v. Burwell, Roman Catholic Archbishop of Washington v. Burwell, East Texas Baptist University v. Burwell and Little Sisters of the Poor Home for the Aged v. Burwell.

Due to the death of Justice Antonin Scalia before the case was decided, the Supreme Court was deadlocked on Zubik. Instead of issuing a decision, it ordered the cases back to lower courts and ordered the HHS and other responsible departments to work with the parties to come up with new rules for exemptions for the mandate that took into account the parties' concerns. As part of this, by the end of 2016, an initial period of requests for input has been opened as part of the new rule-making procedure.

=== Trump administration change ===
Shortly after taking office, President Donald Trump issued Executive Order 13798, "Promoting Free Speech and Religious Liberty" in May 2017 to urge the departments responsible for the ACA to issue a conscience-based exemption for the contraceptive mandate as soon as possible. By October 2017, the HHS and other agencies issued a ruling letting insurers and employers refuse to provide birth control if doing so violates their religious beliefs or moral convictions.

Several states immediately challenged the new rules in multiple court cases, believing the rules bypassed the process that the Supreme Court has issued in Zubik. In separate cases from the Third and Ninth Circuits, the rules were found to be in violation of the Administrative Procedure Act having been issued in an arbitrary and capricious manner, and a nationwide injunction was placed on their enforcement. The injunction was challenged at the Supreme Court by the government in Little Sisters of the Poor Saints Peter and Paul Home v. Pennsylvania. There, in July 2020, the Court ruled in a 7–2 that the new rules were valid and put into place properly, lifting the injunction.

=== Reactions ===
More Democratic politicians favor these mandates than Republican politicians. Barbara Boxer, Democratic Party Senator for California, and House Minority Leader Nancy Pelosi favor the Obama policy.

Darrell Issa, a Republican congressman from California, said that Americans are divided on this issue: "While some Americans may not feel that forcing them to pay for contraception are an infringement on their religious beliefs, others consider it to be an assault against their freedom of conscience." Issa's February 2012 hearing on the matter was criticized by Democratic representatives for including only men from conservative religious institutions, and no women, leading to a walkout of three committee members.

==== Framing the issue ====
Certain consumers of mandatory health insurance, such as students matriculated at colleges of further education, have criticized what they perceive to be discrimination in provision or in practice: employer-provided plans that cover University faculty and staff may be subject to legal mandates whereas plans that cover the student body may not. Sandra Fluke was invited to present oral arguments on behalf of certain female student consumers dissatisfied with restrictions attached to registration for undergraduate and graduate attendance at Georgetown University School of Law.

== See also ==
- United States House Committee on Oversight and Government Reform (section Hearing on February 16, 2012)
- Rush Limbaugh–Sandra Fluke controversy
- Title X
- Healthy People program
- Legal challenges to the Patient Protection and Affordable Care Act
- Sandra Fluke on Wikiquote
