= Rock the Slut Vote =

American political slogan

Rock the Slut Vote is a registered trademark that was issued on January 22, 2013, by the United States Patent and Trademark Office (USPTO) to Susan MacMillan Emry.

== Description ==
Emry applied for the trademark to use as part of a feminist public relations campaign centering on American politics and voting. The name originated from a remark made by conservative commentator, Rush Limbaugh, who called Georgetown University law student Sandra Fluke a "slut" after she testified in favor of contraceptives at a Congressional hearing in February, 2012.

== Brand name ==
In interviews with journalists, Emry states that "she chose to brand the site with the derogatory term in an effort to take it back and turn it into a rallying cry".

== Mission ==
The stated mission of the campaign "is to fight the GOP effort to bully, subjugate and silence women. We will wrest the power from the word slut and help women get informed, get involved, get registered and vote." The graphic used by the campaign is a lipstick mark representing a full kiss. The campaign created a website in 2012 that offered assistance in registering to vote and provided templates for people to use to contact their representatives with a focus on rights to reproductive health care. The campaign also launched a Facebook page in 2012.

== Criticism ==
The founder of the campaign and owner of the trademark, Emry, and another spokesperson, Kimberley A. Johnson, report receiving criticism about the name of the campaign from both left and right. Emry states that some of the harshest criticisms have come from the political right.

== Book ==
Emry also wrote a short book entitled Rock the Slut Vote; American Edition: Navigating the Republican War on Women; it was illustrated by Candace Foy.

== Founder ==
Emry, the founder of the site and the holder of the registered trademark, was born in 1956. She has two children and lives in San Luis Obispo, California.
