= Feminazi =

Pejorative term for feminists

Feminazi (also Femi-Nazi) is a pejorative term for feminists that was popularized by politically conservative American radio talk show host Rush Limbaugh.

== Origins and usage ==
Feminazi is a portmanteau of the nouns feminist and Nazi. According to The Oxford Dictionary of American Political Slang, it refers (pejoratively) to "a committed feminist or a strong-willed woman". The earliest attested use, according to the Oxford English Dictionary, is a 1989 article in the Los Angeles Times about an anti-abortion protest that used the slogan "Feminazis Go Home". The term was later popularized by American conservative radio talk show host Rush Limbaugh in the early 1990s. Limbaugh credited the coining of the term to university professor Thomas Hazlett.

Limbaugh, who was vocally critical of the feminist movement, stated that the term feminazi refers to "radical feminists" whose goal is "to see that there are as many abortions as possible", a small group of "militants" whom he characterized as having a "quest for power" and a "belief that men aren't necessary". Limbaugh distinguished these women from "well-intentioned but misguided people who call themselves 'feminists'". However, the term came to be widely used for feminism as a whole. According to The New Partridge Dictionary of Slang and Unconventional English, Limbaugh used the term "to marginalize any feminist as a hardline, uncompromising manhater". The New York Times has described it as "one of [Limbaugh's] favorite epithets for supporters of women's rights".

The term feminazi is used to characterize feminist perspectives as extreme in order to discredit feminist arguments and to stigmatize women's views or behavior as "radical", "extreme", and "tyrannical". It has been used in mainstream American discourse to erroneously portray women as hyper-vigilant to perceived sexism. Literary critic Toril Moi writes that the term reflects commonplace ideas that feminists "hate men", are "dogmatic, inflexible, and intolerant", and constitute "an extremist, power-hungry minority". In his book Angry White Men, the sociologist Michael Kimmel says the term is used to attack feminist campaigns for equal pay and safety from rape and domestic violence by associating them with Nazi genocide.

The term is used as an insult across mass media and social media. "Feminazis" are often described as dangerous, strident, man-hating, prudish, humorless, and overly sensitive. Linguist Geraldine Horan writes that there is a marked increase in the use of the term in mainstream media whenever a female public figure makes headlines. Usage in the United Kingdom peaked in 2015 along with reporting on barrister Charlotte Proudman, who had criticized a male colleague for commenting on her appearance online. In Australia, the term gained wider use following the 1995 publication of the book The First Stone, and has been used in popular media to characterize feminists as threatening, "vindictive", and "puritanical".

== Reactions ==
The meaning and appropriateness of the term feminazi have frequently been discussed in the media. Horan attributes use of feminazi as an insult to "a wider phenomenon of gendered criticism, bullying and trolling aimed [at] women in the public eye". According to Helen Lewis, deputy editor of the New Statesman, "the idea of conflating a liberation movement with Nazism is just deeply ignorant. It’s self-undermining, because it’s so over the top." Laura Bates, the founder of the Everyday Sexism Project, has said that "It’s a desperate attempt to demonise us, and it’s frustrating, because if it wasn’t such an offensive word, you could actually start to embrace it and own it".

Activist Gloria Steinem writes, "I've never met anyone who fits that description [of wanting as many abortions as possible], though [Limbaugh] lavishes it on me among many others". Steinem has suggested a boycott of Limbaugh for his use of the term, stating, "Hitler came to power against the strong feminist movement in Germany, padlocked the family planning clinics, and declared abortion a crime against the state—all views that more closely resemble Rush Limbaugh's".

Moi writes that Limbaugh's words prompted a shift in the public perception of feminism across the American political spectrum starting in the mid-1990s; Americans came to see feminists as dogmatic and power-hungry women who hate men and who are incapable of challenging their own assumptions; though the term feminazi may have been created to describe a small group of particular feminists, it calcified into a stereotype of all feminists or all women. Moi writes that feminism became "the F-word," a label that women hesitated to claim for themselves lest they be seen as "feminazis", even among those who agreed with the goals of feminism.

== See also ==
- Antifeminism – Ideology opposing feminism
- "Nasty woman" - Phrase used by Donald Trump to describe Hillary Clinton
- Reductio ad Hitlerum – Logical fallacy
- Snowflake (slang) – Pejoratively, an easily offended person
- Social justice warrior – Pejorative term for a socially progressive person
- Straw feminism – Distortion or fabrication of feminist arguments
