= Sandra Fluke =

American activist and lawyer (born 1981)

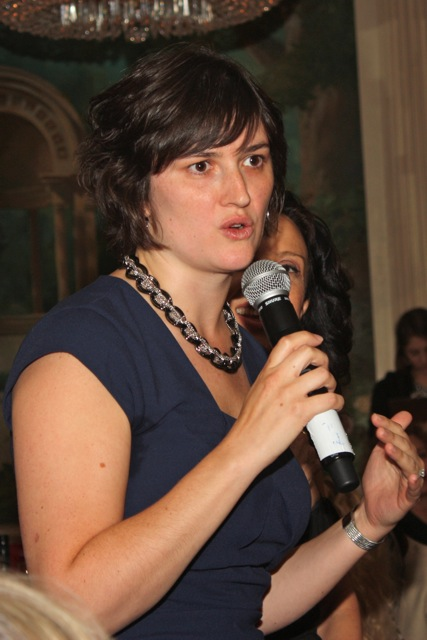
- Sandra Fluke on May 4, 2013
- Born: Sandra Kay Fluke; April 17, 1981 (age 45); Saxton, Pennsylvania, U.S.
- Education: Cornell University (BA); Georgetown University (JD)
- Occupations: Attorney, activist
- Political party: Democratic
- Spouse: Adam Mutterperl

Sandra Kay Fluke (/flʊk/, born April 17, 1981) is an American lawyer, women's rights activist, and representative to the Democratic Party of San Fernando Valley.

She first came to public attention when, in February 2012, Republican members of the House Oversight and Government Reform Committee refused to allow her to testify to that committee on the importance of requiring insurance plans to cover birth control during a discussion on whether medical insurance should have a contraception mandate. She later spoke to Democratic representatives.

Fluke supported Barack Obama's presidential re-election campaign in 2012 and was a featured speaker at the 2012 Democratic National Convention. She ran for the California State Senate seat of Ted Lieu, who vacated the seat to run for the congressional seat being vacated by Henry Waxman. Fluke lost to fellow Democrat Ben Allen.

== Early life ==
Sandra Fluke is a native of Saxton, Pennsylvania, the daughter of Richard B. Fluke II, a licensed pastor at a Methodist church, and Betty Kay (née Donaldson). She graduated from Pennsylvania's Tussey Mountain Junior/Senior High School in 1999.

== Education ==
In 2003, Fluke graduated from Cornell University's New York State College of Human Ecology with double major in Policy Analysis and Management and Feminist, Gender & Sexuality Studies.

== Career ==
Fluke co-founded the New York Statewide Coalition for Fair Access to Family Court, whose advocacy led to legislation granting access to civil orders of protection for victims of intimate partner violence, including teenage and LGBTQ victims. According to the website of Georgetown University, Fluke also participated in the Manhattan Borough President's Taskforce on Domestic Violence and "many other New York City and New York State coalitions that successfully fought for policy improvements affecting victims of domestic violence". While in New York City, she worked for Sanctuary for Families, which aids victims of domestic violence and human trafficking.

According to The Washington Post, Fluke was interested in contraceptive coverage when starting out at Georgetown University Law Center, researching the college's student health plans before enrolling to find that birth control was not included. "I decided I was absolutely not willing to compromise the quality of my education in exchange for my health care," she said. Fluke spent the following three years trying to persuade the administration of the Jesuit college to change its policy regarding student contraceptive coverage. She said she had intended to use her testimony before Congress to talk about the effects of the lack of birth control coverage on students at Georgetown.

In 2011, Fluke was a recipient of the Women Lawyers of Los Angeles' Fran Kandel Public Interest Grant from Georgetown University Law Center, which supported her production of a video on how to take out a restraining order. She also "represented numerous victims of domestic violence and human trafficking," according to Georgetown University. She also served as president of the Georgetown Law Students for Reproductive Justice student organization. Marianne Schnall writes in What Will It Take to Make A Woman President? that Fluke "has been recognised for her extensive pro bono representation of victims of domestic violence and human trafficking and for her human-rights advocacy efforts in Kenya."

Fluke received her Juris Doctor degree, cum laude, from Georgetown Law in 2012. She passed the California bar exam in July 2012 and was admitted to practice in the state on December 11, 2012.

=== 2012 Congressional testimony ===
Sandra Fluke reading a prepared statement for U.S. Congressional testimony, February 16, 2012

While a law student at Georgetown, Fluke was invited by Democrats to speak at a February 2012 hearing by the House Oversight and Government Reform Committee on new Administration rules concerning the Conscience Clause exceptions in healthcare associated with the Patient Protection and Affordable Care Act. Democrats requested that the committee add Sandra Fluke to the first panel, which was otherwise an all-male panel of clergy and theologians. Committee chairman Darrell Issa, a Republican congressman from California, refused to allow Fluke to testify at the hearing, stating that Fluke lacked expertise, was not a member of the clergy, and her name was not submitted in time for the hearing. Democratic members criticized the decision not to include Fluke because of the lack of female witnesses at the hearing, which was to examine contraception coverage.

A week later, on February 23, the House Democratic Steering and Policy Committee convened a meeting to invite Fluke to speak. Fluke offered testimony in support of President Obama's ruling that religiously affiliated institutions such as universities and hospitals should provide insurance plans that cover all costs for medicinal contraceptives. During her testimony, Fluke stated, "We did not expect that women would be told in the national media that we should have gone to school elsewhere" to receive contraception coverage. "We refuse to pick between a quality education and our health," she said. Fluke further stated that 40% of Georgetown Law School's female population suffered financial hardship as a result of birth control not being covered by the student health insurance plan, and that the lack of contraception coverage in the university insurance plans would induce many low-income students to go without contraceptives. She said that the women of Georgetown, other religious schools, and employees of religious institutions such as hospitals have endured "financial, emotional and medical burdens because of this lack of contraceptive coverage". She mentioned friends affected by such policies, citing a friend with polyendocrine metabolic ovarian syndrome (PMOS). Fluke stated this friend needed contraceptive hormones costing over $100 per month to treat the disease, and that while PMOS was "covered by Georgetown insurance", the insurance company repeatedly denied contraceptives because they suspected the purpose of the medication was for contraceptive uses.

=== Rush Limbaugh controversy ===
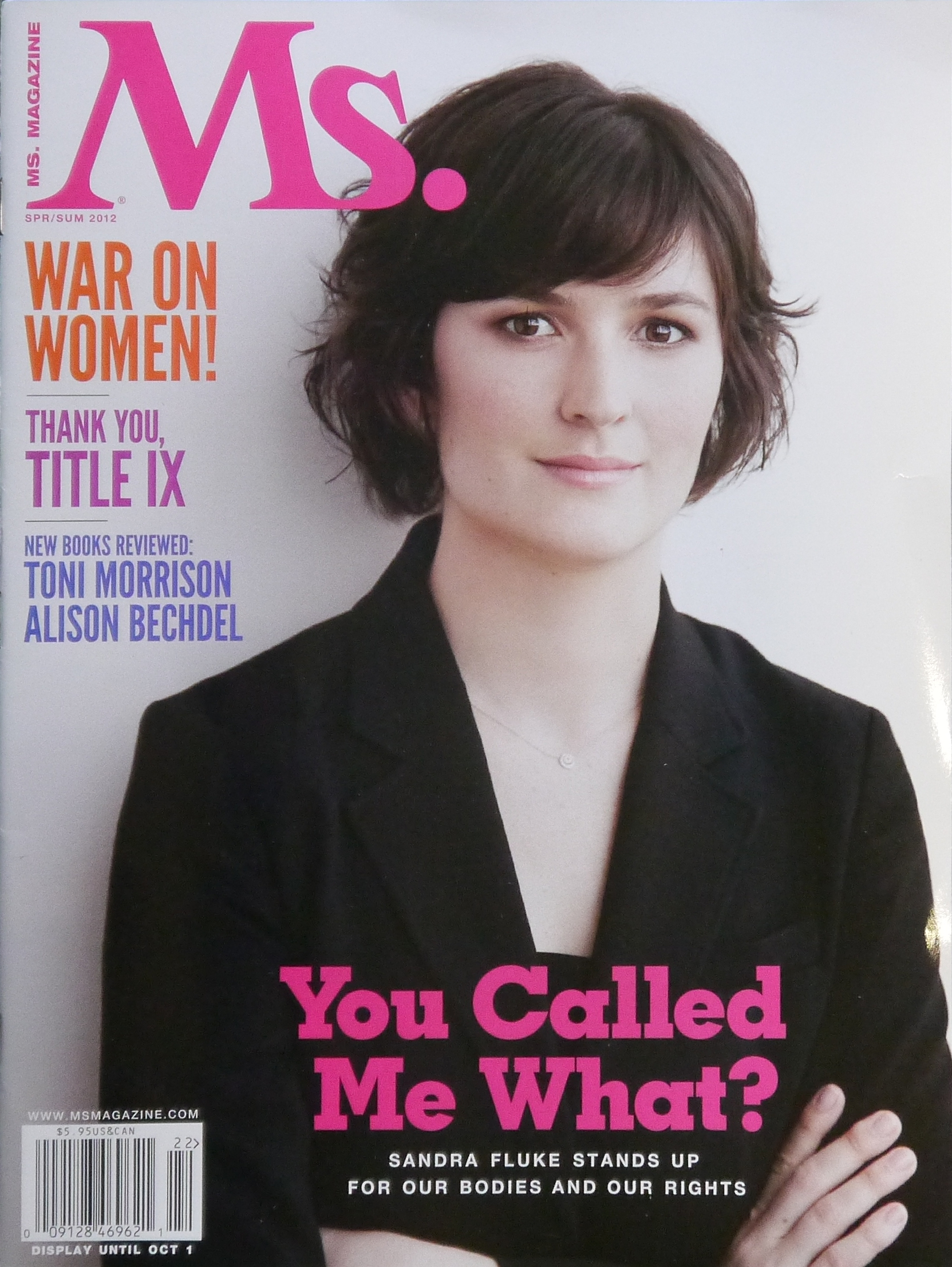
Sandra Fluke on the cover of Ms. magazine in 2012

Fluke's testimony on February 23 did not refer to her own sex life or use of contraceptives. She spoke instead about the experiences of fellow law students; according to The Washington Post, these included "Students who pay as much as $1,000 a year out-of-pocket for a birth-control prescription, a married woman who stopped taking the pill because she couldn't afford it, and a friend who needed the prescription for a medical condition unrelated to pregnancy but gave up battling to get it".

On February 29, 2012, radio host Rush Limbaugh referred to Fluke's testimony to House Democrats on his show, The Rush Limbaugh Show, calling Fluke a "slut" and a "prostitute". Limbaugh stated:

[Fluke] essentially says that she must be paid to have sex—what does that make her? It makes her a slut, right? It makes her a prostitute. She wants to be paid to have sex. She's having so much sex she can't afford the contraception. She wants you and me and the taxpayers to pay her to have sex.

Fluke responded by saying that she was "stunned" and "outraged" by Limbaugh's remarks, calling them "an attempt to silence me, to silence all of us from speaking about the healthcare we need". Limbaugh's comments were also criticized by prominent Democrats and Republicans, and several companies suspended their advertising on The Rush Limbaugh Show in protest.

Georgetown University President John J. DeGioia defended Fluke as "a model of civil discourse" in a statement, calling Limbaugh's remarks "misogynistic, vitriolic, and a misrepresentation of the position of our student". Fluke also received a phone call from United States President Barack Obama, who expressed disappointment that Fluke had been the subject of "unfortunate attacks". White House spokesman Jay Carney told the press that "The president called Georgetown law student Sandra Fluke because he wanted to offer his support, express his disappointment that she was the subject of an inappropriate personal attack and thank her for exercising her rights as a citizen to speak out on public policy."

On March 3, Limbaugh apologized to Fluke for his comments in a statement on his website, saying, "My choice of words was not the best, and in the attempt to be humorous, I created a national stir. I sincerely apologize to Ms. Fluke for the insulting word choices." Fluke described Limbaugh's public apology as insufficient, saying, "I don't think that a statement like this [...] changes anything, and especially when that statement is issued when he's under significant pressure from his sponsors who have begun to pull their support".

In 2013, Californian Susan MacMillan Emry co-organized a public relations campaign called Rock the Slut Vote in response to Limbaugh's remarks. The stated mission of the campaign "is to fight the GOP effort to bully, subjugate and silence women. We will wrest the power from the word slut and help women get informed, get involved, get registered and vote.”

=== Support of Barack Obama's re-election campaign ===
In a June 2012 op-ed for CNN, Fluke described what she called "President Barack Obama and former [Governor] Mitt Romney's vastly different values and visions", specifically mentioning Obama's support of the Lilly Ledbetter Fair Pay Act, increasing the government's investment of Pell Grant scholarships, and the Patient Protection and Affordable Care Act. Fluke described Obama as "a president who has consistently shown he will defend [women's] rights while working to ensure that all women and men have all the protections and opportunities they need to pursue economic success". Fluke later introduced President Obama at an August 2012 campaign rally in Denver and spoke in support of the president at the 2012 Democratic National Convention, describing the Republican Party's platform as "an offensive, obsolete relic of our past". The Los Angeles Times described Fluke as "a symbolic presence in a convention that has been dominated by Democrats reaching out for the votes of women". Congressman Joe Walsh of Illinois responded to the speech by saying that Fluke was acting "entitled" and told her to "get a job"; Fluke wrote in response that Walsh "disparage[d] my generation", and questioned why many elected officials' answer to struggling Americans was "cutting their safety net".

=== 2014 election ===
Two years after moving to West Hollywood, Fluke announced she was running for California State Senate in the new 26th district created by the 2011 redistricting. The new district is roughly equivalent to the pre-redistricting 28th district represented by Ted Lieu. In the June 3 primary, she came in second with 19.5% of the vote. In the November 4th elections she faced Democrat Ben Allen, who had won the primary with 22% of the vote, and she was defeated 61% to 39%.

== Personal life ==
In April 2012, Fluke became engaged to television producer and writer Adam Mutterperl. By the time of her failed 2014 bid for the California Legislature, they were married. They live in the Los Angeles area with their pet dog, Mr. President.

== See also ==
- Reproductive justice
- Reproductive rights
