= Missouri's 7th Senate district =

American legislative district

Missouri's 7th State Senate district
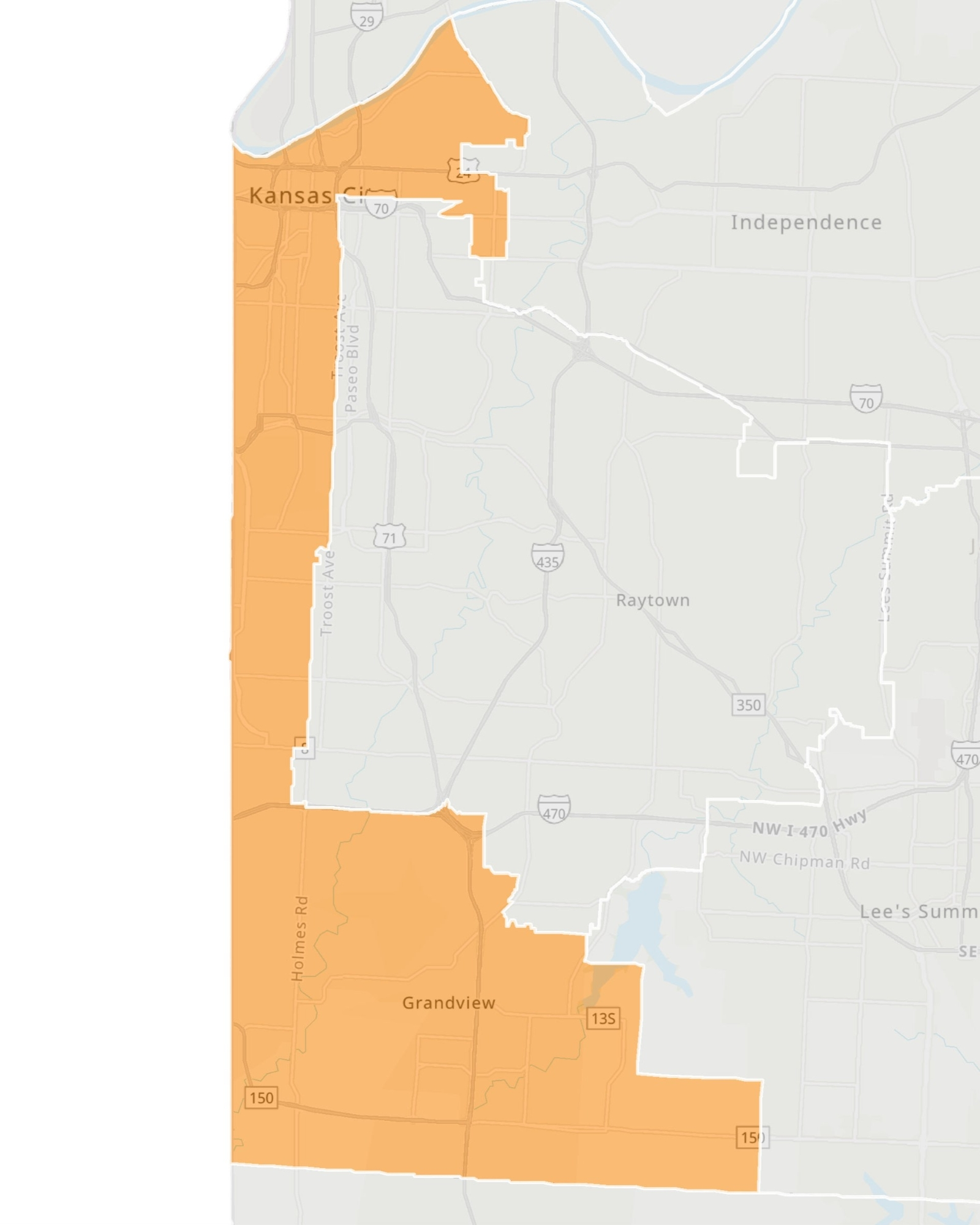
Senator
Patty Lewis; D–Kansas City
- Demographics: 61% White; 17% Black; 13% Hispanic; 3% Asian; 5% Multiracial
- Population (2023): 171,110

Missouri's 7th Senatorial District is one of 34 districts in the Missouri Senate. The district has been represented by Democrat Patty Lewis since 2025.

== Geography ==
The district is based in Kansas City, specifically the predominantly White part of the city along the Missouri-Kansas border. The district is home to the University of Missouri-Kansas City, the Nelson-Atkins Museum of Art, the Kansas City Union Station, the Crown Center mall, and the National World War I Museum and Memorial.

== Election results (1996–2024) ==
=== 1996 ===
Missouri's 7th Senatorial District election (1996)
Party	Candidate	Votes	%
Republican	Francis E. Flotron Jr.	43,022	59.83
Independent	James Russell	28,882	40.17
Total votes		71,904	100.00

=== 2000 ===
Missouri's 7th Senatorial District election (2000)
Party	Candidate	Votes	%
Republican	John William Loudon	54,435	100.00
Total votes		54,435	100.00
Republican hold			

=== 2004 ===
Missouri's 7th Senatorial District election (2004)
Party	Candidate	Votes	%
Republican	John William Loudon (incumbent)	54,252	60.76
Democratic	Mark A. Schuler	35,033	39.24
Total votes		89,285	100.00
Republican hold			

=== 2008 ===
Missouri's 7th Senatorial District election (2008)
Party	Candidate	Votes	%
Republican	Jane Cunningham	54,702	61.43
Democratic	Kevin Leeseberg	34,347	38.57
Total votes		89,049	100.00
Republican hold			

=== 2012 ===
Missouri's 7th Senatorial District election (2012)
Party	Candidate	Votes	%
Democratic	Jason Holsman	64,674	100.00
Total votes		64,674	100.00
Democratic gain from Republican			

=== 2016 ===
Missouri's 7th Senatorial District election (2016)
Party	Candidate	Votes	%
Democratic	Jason Holsman (incumbent)	60,759	79.23
Libertarian	Jeanne Bojarski	15,931	20.77
Total votes		76,690	100.00
Democratic hold			

=== 2020 ===
Missouri's 7th Senatorial District election (2020)
Party	Candidate	Votes	%
Democratic	Greg Razer	70,586	82.09
Green	Nathan Kline	15,383	17.89
Write-In	Tiffany Poke	9	<0.01
Write-In	Jorge Fuller	9	<0.01
Total votes		85,987	100.00
Democratic hold			

=== 2024 ===
Missouri's 7th Senatorial District election (2024)
Party	Candidate	Votes	%
Democratic	Patty Lewis	58,149	74.47
Republican	Joey LaSalle	19,939	25.53
Total votes		78,088	100.00
Democratic hold			

== Statewide election results ==
Year	Office	Results
2008	President	Obama 69.5 – 29.3%
2012	President	Obama 69.2 – 30.8%
2016	President	Clinton 69.7 – 24.8%
2016	Senate	Kander 71.7 – 24.5%
2016	Governor	Koster 70.2 – 25.9%
2018	Senate	McCaskill 74.7 – 23.0%
2020	President	Biden 74.7 – 23.4%
2020	Governor	Galloway 72.7 – 25.1%
