= Melich =

Melich is a surname. Notable people with the surname include:

- Lukáš Melich (born 1980), Czech hammer thrower
- Mitchell Melich (1912–1999), United States Department of the Interior official
- Tanya Melich, American feminist
- Vlastimil Melich (1928–1978), Czechoslovak Nordic combined skier
