= Todd Akin =

American politician (1947–2021)

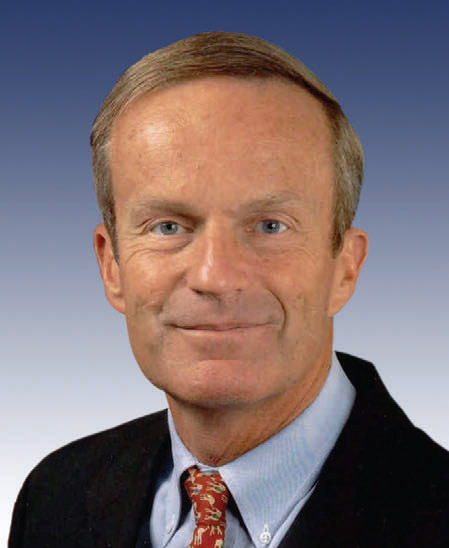
- Akin, c. 2001-2007

Member of the U.S. House of Representatives from Missouri's 2nd district
- In office January 3, 2001 – January 3, 2013
- Preceded by: Jim Talent
- Succeeded by: Ann Wagner

Member of the Missouri House of Representatives
- In office January 3, 1989 – January 3, 2001
- Preceded by: Franc Flotron
- Succeeded by: Jane Cunningham
- Constituency: 85th district (1989–1993); 86th district (1993–2001)

Personal details
- Born: William Todd Akin; July 5, 1947 New York City, U.S.
- Died: October 3, 2021 (aged 74) Wildwood, Missouri, U.S.
- Party: Republican
- Spouse: Lulli Boe (m. 1975)
- Children: 6
- Education: Worcester Polytechnic Institute (BS); Covenant Theological Seminary (MDiv)

Military service
- Branch/service: United States Army: Missouri Army National Guard; U.S. Army Reserve
- Years of service: 1972–1980
- Unit: U.S. Army Corps of Engineers

William Todd Akin (July 5, 1947 – October 3, 2021) was an American politician who served as the U.S. representative for Missouri's 2nd congressional district from 2001 to 2013. He was a member of the Republican Party. Born in New York City, Akin grew up in the Greater St. Louis area. After receiving his bachelor's degree from Worcester Polytechnic Institute in Massachusetts, Akin served in the U.S. Army Corps of Engineers and worked in the computer and steel industries. In 1988, he was elected to the Missouri House of Representatives. He served in the state house until 2000, when he was elected to the U.S. House of Representatives, in which he served until 2013.

Akin's Congressional career ended after he lost a bid to unseat Democratic U.S. Senator Claire McCaskill in the 2012 election. Akin, who had won the Republican primary in a crowded field, led McCaskill in pre-election polls until he said that women who are victims of what he called "legitimate rape" rarely get pregnant. Akin eventually apologized for the remark but rebuffed calls to withdraw from the election. He lost to McCaskill, 54.7 percent to 39.2 percent. In a book published in July 2014, Akin defended his original comments and said he regretted having apologized.

== Early life, education, and business career ==
Akin was born in New York City, and raised in the St. Louis area. He was the son of Nancy Perry (née Bigelow) and Paul Bigelow Akin. Akin's great-grandfather, Thomas Russell Akin, founded Laclede Steel Corporation of St. Louis in 1911. The company eventually passed to his grandfather, William Akin, and then to his father Paul, a third-generation graduate of Harvard University who served as an officer in the Navy during World War II.

Akin graduated from John Burroughs School, a private prep school in suburban St. Louis, and Worcester Polytechnic Institute in Worcester, Massachusetts, earning a Bachelor of Science in Management Engineering in 1970. Following graduation, Akin served as an engineer officer in the National Guard of the U.S. Army, then served in the Army Reserve until 1980. After leaving active duty, Akin sold large computer systems for IBM, then worked as a manager in his family's steel business. Akin earned a Master of Divinity (M.Div.) degree in 1984 from Covenant Theological Seminary where he studied Greek, Hebrew, and a socially conservative interpretation of the Christian scriptures. He did not enter the ministry.

Akin was a longtime anti-abortion activist and a onetime member of the board of Missouri Right to Life. He was arrested for trespass at least eight times between 1985 and 1988 while demonstrating against abortion in front of abortion clinics in Illinois and Missouri. He said the protests were peaceful and he would not apologize for standing up for his beliefs. At the time of the arrests, he was using the name "William Akin"; after that period, when he ran for political office, it was as "Todd Akin".

== Missouri House of Representatives ==
=== Elections ===
Akin was elected to the Missouri House of Representatives in November 1988, running unopposed to represent District 85 in West County. He won re-election in 1990 with 59% of the vote. Due to re-districting, Akin represented District 86 from 1993 through 2000, never winning less than 66% of the vote.

=== Tenure ===
Akin served as a member of the House Ways and Means Committee. During his 12 years in the state house, Akin advocated for homeschool rights, voted for carrying concealed weapons, voted against the parks and soils sales tax, and voted against the 1993 tax increase and education spending increase. Akin sponsored legislation to prohibit casino companies from contributing to Missouri state lawmakers. In 1995, he fought Democratic governor Mel Carnahan over a bill providing state funding for school nurses. Ultimately, the governor refused to sign the funding bill due to Akin's amendment, which would have prohibited nurses from telling students about sources for information about abortion.

== U.S. House of Representatives ==
=== Elections ===
In 2000, Akin ran in the Republican primary election to fill the House seat vacated by U.S. Representative Jim Talent, who was running for governor. Light voter turnout caused by heavy rains helped Akin win the tight, five-way primary by just 56 votes; he defeated two better-known candidates, former St. Louis County Executive Gene McNary and State Senator Franc Flotron. On the night he won the primary, Akin said, "My base will show up in earthquakes." He defeated Democratic state senator Ted House in the general election, winning 55 percent of the vote. He never faced another contest as close, and was reelected five times. In 2010, Akin won re-election with 67.9% of the vote.

=== Tenure ===
For most of his tenure, Akin was listed in the official House roll as "R-St. Louis," even though his district didn't include any portion of the city of St. Louis.

==== Social issues ====
Akin was an outspoken opponent of abortion in all cases, including health reasons or in cases of rape or incest, and he opposed embryonic stem cell research. In a 2008 speech on the House floor, Akin called abortion providers "terrorists" and alleged that it was "common practice" for abortion providers to perform "abortions" on women who were not actually pregnant.

Akin was a staunch advocate of a federal prohibition of online poker. In 2006, he co-sponsored H.R. 4411, the Goodlatte-Leach Internet Gambling Prohibition Act, and H.R. 4777, the Internet Gambling Prohibition Act.

Akin also authored the Protect the Pledge (of Allegiance) Act. In late June 2011, Akin objected to NBC's recent removal of the words "under God" from a video clip of school children reciting the Pledge of Allegiance. After remarking that "NBC has a long record of being very liberal," Akin said, "at the heart of liberalism really was a hatred for God and a belief that government should replace God". Two days later, Akin said he did not mean all liberals hate God, only that liberals have "a hatred for public references for God." The next day, he apologized, saying his statement had been "directed at the political movement, Liberalism, not at any specific individual".

During his 2012 U.S. Senate bid, Akin reaffirmed his opposition to legislation like the Lilly Ledbetter Fair Pay Act of 2009, which he voted against as a Congressman.

Akin opposed the No Child Left Behind Act. Akin believed that it should not be the federal government that decides on education, but that local government should have control over public education.

==== Fiscal issues ====
In his early years in Congress, Akin brought back earmarks for his district, voted to raise the debt ceiling, voted for off-balance-sheet wars in Iraq and Afghanistan, and voted to create the unfunded Medicare prescription drug benefit. Later in his tenure, he opposed increases in taxation and spending. He voted in 2007 against an expansion of the State Children's Health Insurance Program (SCHIP), objecting to its potential coverage of children in families making up to $62,000 a year, and stating that proof of U.S. citizenship was not required. He also said the bill would "weaken the private health care system" and lead the country "further down the slippery slope to socialized medicine." He voted against federally funded school breakfasts and lunches, and called student loans "a stage-three cancer of socialism". He also voted against increasing the minimum wage. He was a vocal critic of the September 2008 bank bailout, and voted against it. He voted no on the Affordable Health Care Act in March 2010. He voted for Paul Ryan's fiscal year 2012 budget.

==== Military issues ====
Akin spent time working on military and veterans issues. On the House Armed Services Committee, he served as the chairman of the Seapower and Projection Forces Subcommittee, which handles Navy and Air Force issues. He served as the Ranking Republican on the Seapower Subcommittee and the Oversight and Investigations Subcommittee. Akin also introduced veterans-related bills, most notably the Open Burn Pit Registry Act, which creates a registry for Iraq and Afghanistan veterans who were exposed to burn pits. He opposed repeal of the Dover Policy, which banned media coverage of caskets of troops returning home from overseas, citing privacy and decorum issues.

=== Committee assignments ===
- Committee on Armed Services
  - Subcommittee on Tactical Air and Land Forces
  - Subcommittee on Seapower and Expeditionary Forces (Chair)
- Committee on the Budget
- Committee on Science, Space and Technology
  - Subcommittee on Space and Aeronautics
  - Subcommittee on Energy and Environment

=== Caucus memberships ===
- Republican Study Committee
- Tea Party Caucus

== 2012 U.S. Senate election ==
In mid-May 2011, Akin announced he would seek the Republican nomination in 2012 to unseat Democratic senator Claire McCaskill. Other candidates in the August 2012 Republican primary included businessman John Brunner, author and business executive Mark Memoly, and former Missouri Treasurer Sarah Steelman who had backing from the Tea Party. Despite losing some momentum and in a crowded field, Akin won the Republican nomination in the August 7 open primary, 36% to 30% for his nearest challenger. The Claire McCaskill campaign spent $2 million during the primaries, despite not having a primary opponent. That money was spent on advertising touting Akin as "Too conservative," for Missouri. In 2012, National Journal named Akin one of ten Republicans to follow on Twitter.

Akin faced McCaskill and Libertarian nominee Jonathan Dine in the general election, losing to McCaskill after his controversial comments on rape lost him a great deal of support.

=== Home of record ===
In May 2011, questions were raised about Akin's official address for voting. For most of his political career, Akin had claimed Town and Country as his official residence. However, according to the Associated Press and the St. Louis Post-Dispatch, Akin moved to Wildwood, in far western St. Louis County, sometime between 2007 and 2009, after he and his wife purchased a second home there. However, he continued to vote as a Town and Country resident, and signed a polling place logbook attesting to his living there in April 2011.

=== Comments on rape and pregnancy ===
In a local news interview, on August 19, 2012, whilst discussing abortion, Akin claimed that victims of what he described as "legitimate rape" very rarely become pregnant. Airing on St. Louis television station KTVI, his response to a question on rape exceptions for abortion was:

Well you know, people always want to try to make that as one of those things, well how do you, how do you slice this particularly tough sort of ethical question. First of all, from what I understand from doctors, that's really rare. If it's a legitimate rape, the female body has ways to try to shut that whole thing down. But let's assume that maybe that didn't work or something. I think there should be some punishment, but the punishment ought to be on the rapist and not attacking the child.

The comments from Akin, which came as he ran for the U.S. Senate seat held by Claire McCaskill, almost immediately led to widespread uproar. The term "legitimate rape" was called "loathsome" because it suggests that "there are different categories of rape – some real and awful and others that are not". Others took exception to the phrasing because it suggests that the victims who do become pregnant from rape may be lying. His claims about the likelihood of pregnancy resulting from rape were seen by some as being based on fringe ideas like stress-induced miscarriage or Dr. John C. Willke's "spastic tubes" theory introduced in 1985 and trauma-based theory introduced in 1999. These theories are not accepted by the majority of the scientific and medical community. Akin was not the first to make such claims, but was perhaps one of the most prominent until then.

The comment was widely characterized as misogynistic and recklessly inaccurate, with many commentators remarking on the use of the words "legitimate rape". Related news articles cited a 1996 article in an obstetrics and gynecology journal, which found that 5% of women who were raped became pregnant, which equaled about 32,000 pregnancies each year in the US alone. A separate 2003 article in the journal Human Nature estimated that rapes are twice as likely to result in pregnancies as consensual sex.

While some colleagues such as Iowa congressman Steve King and Tennessee state senator Stacey Campfield supported Akin, senior figures in both parties condemned his remarks and some Republicans called for him to resign. In the resulting furor, Akin received widespread calls to drop out of his Senate race from both Republicans and Democrats.

Akin characterized his comments as a gaffe, saying he "misspoke." His campaign ran an advertisement in which he asked voters to forgive him, saying:

Rape was an evil act. I used the wrong words in the wrong way and for that I apologize. As the father of two daughters, I want tough justice for predators. I have a compassionate heart for the victims of sexual assault. I pray for them. The fact is, rape can lead to pregnancy. The truth is, rape has many victims. The mistake I made was in the words I said, not in the heart I hold. I ask for your forgiveness.

The incident was seen as having an impact on Akin's senate race and the Republicans' chances of gaining a majority in the U.S. Senate, by making news in the week before the 2012 Republican National Convention and by "shift[ing] the national discussion to divisive social issues that could repel swing voters rather than economic issues that could attract them".

=== Election result ===
Before the comments, Akin had been favored to win his race against McCaskill, but he lost in November, 54.7 percent to 39.2 percent. His loss was attributed to backlash from women voters, and was the first election he had lost in his political career.

After the election, between November 2012 and August 2013, Akin received $111,000 in donations that in part were for the 2018 Senate primaries, however he left after his term finished on January 3, 2013.

=== Aftermath ===
In July 2014, WND Books published Akin's book, Firing Back: Taking on the Party Bosses and Media Elite to Protect Our Faith and Freedom. In it, he said that he regretted apologizing, because "by asking the public at large for forgiveness, I was validating the willful misinterpretation of what I had said." He also defended his original comments and attacked various Republicans for "wronging" him, including Karl Rove; former National Republican Senatorial Committee Executive Director Rob Jesmer; Senators Mitch McConnell, John Cornyn, John McCain, Roy Blunt, and Lindsey Graham; and House Speaker John Boehner. He also repeatedly attacked the Republican establishment for seeing his comments "as their opportunity to take [me] out and select someone more palatable to their tastes", and the "liberal media" for making him "the target of a media assassination."

== Personal life ==
Akin married Lulli Boe, a graduate of Hollins University, in June 1975. The couple had six children. Lulli became a home schooling activist, and all of the children were home-schooled. Three sons attended the U.S. Naval Academy in Annapolis and became officers in the U. S. Marines. One of his sons served in the assault on Fallujah, Iraq. Akin and his wife lived for many years in his childhood home, a house owned by his father in affluent Town and Country, Missouri. When his father sought to subdivide the 8.5-acre property in the late 2000s, Akin moved to a house in Wildwood.

=== Health and death ===
In April 2001, Akin had surgery to treat prostate cancer, which was detected at an "early stage". He died from cancer at his home on October 3, 2021, at age 74.

== Electoral history ==
Year	Office	Republican			Democratic			Libertarian			Ref
		Candidate	Votes	%	Candidate	Votes	%	Candidate	Votes	%	Ref
1988	Missouri House, Dist. 85	Todd Akin	14,538	100%	None	0	0	None	0	0	
1990	Missouri House, Dist. 85	Todd Akin	6,815	59%	Chris Liese	4,656	41%	None	0	0	
1992	Missouri House, Dist. 86	Todd Akin	14,809	100%	None	0	0	None	0	0	
1994	Missouri House, Dist. 86	Todd Akin	9,157	70%	Leonard Hyman	4,015	30%	None	0	0	
1996	Missouri House Dist. 86	Todd Akin	10,791	67%	Leonard Hyman	5,210	33%	None	0	0	
1998	Missouri House Dist. 86	Todd Akin	8,026	66%	Leonard Hyman	4,137	34%	None	0	0	
2000	U.S. House, Missouri 2nd Dist.	Todd Akin	164,926	55%	Tedd House	126,441	42%	James Higgins	2,524	1%	
2002	U.S. House, Missouri 2nd Dist.	Todd Akin	167,057	67%	John Hogan	77,223	31%	Darla Maloney	4,548	2%	
2004	U.S. House, Missouri 2nd Dist.	Todd Akin	228,725	65%	George Weber	115,366	33%	Darla Maloney	4,822	1%	
2006	U.S. House, Missouri 2nd Dist.	Todd Akin	176,452	61%	George Weber	105,242	37%	Tamara Millay	5,923	2%	
2008	U.S. House, Missouri 2nd Dist.	Todd Akin	232,076	62%	William Haas	132,068	35%	Thomas Knapp	8,628	2%	
2010	U.S. House, Missouri 2nd Dist.	Todd Akin	180,481	68%	Arthur Lieber	77,467	29%	Steve Mosbacher	7,677	3%	
2012	U.S. Senate, Missouri	Todd Akin	1,063,698	39.2%	Claire McCaskill	1,484,683	54.7%	Jonathan Dine	164,991	6.1%	

Missouri House of Representatives
Preceded by Franc Flotron	Member of the Missouri House of Representatives from the 85th district 1989–1993	Succeeded by Chris Liese
Preceded by John Hancock	Member of the Missouri House of Representatives from the 86th district 1993–2001	Succeeded by Jane Cunningham
U.S. House of Representatives
Preceded by Jim Talent	Member of the U.S. House of Representatives from Missouri's 2nd congressional district 2001–2013	Succeeded by Ann Wagner
Party political offices
Preceded by Jim Talent	Republican nominee for U.S. Senator from Missouri (Class 1); 2012	Succeeded by Josh Hawley
