= John Loudon =

John Loudon is the name of:

- John Loudon (politician) (1866–1955), Dutch foreign minister (1913–1918)
- John Claudius Loudon (1783–1843), Scottish botanist
- John William Loudon (born 1967), Missouri state senator
- John Loudon McAdam (1756–1836), Scottish inventor of the Macadam Road Surface
