= War on women =

Slogan in United States politics

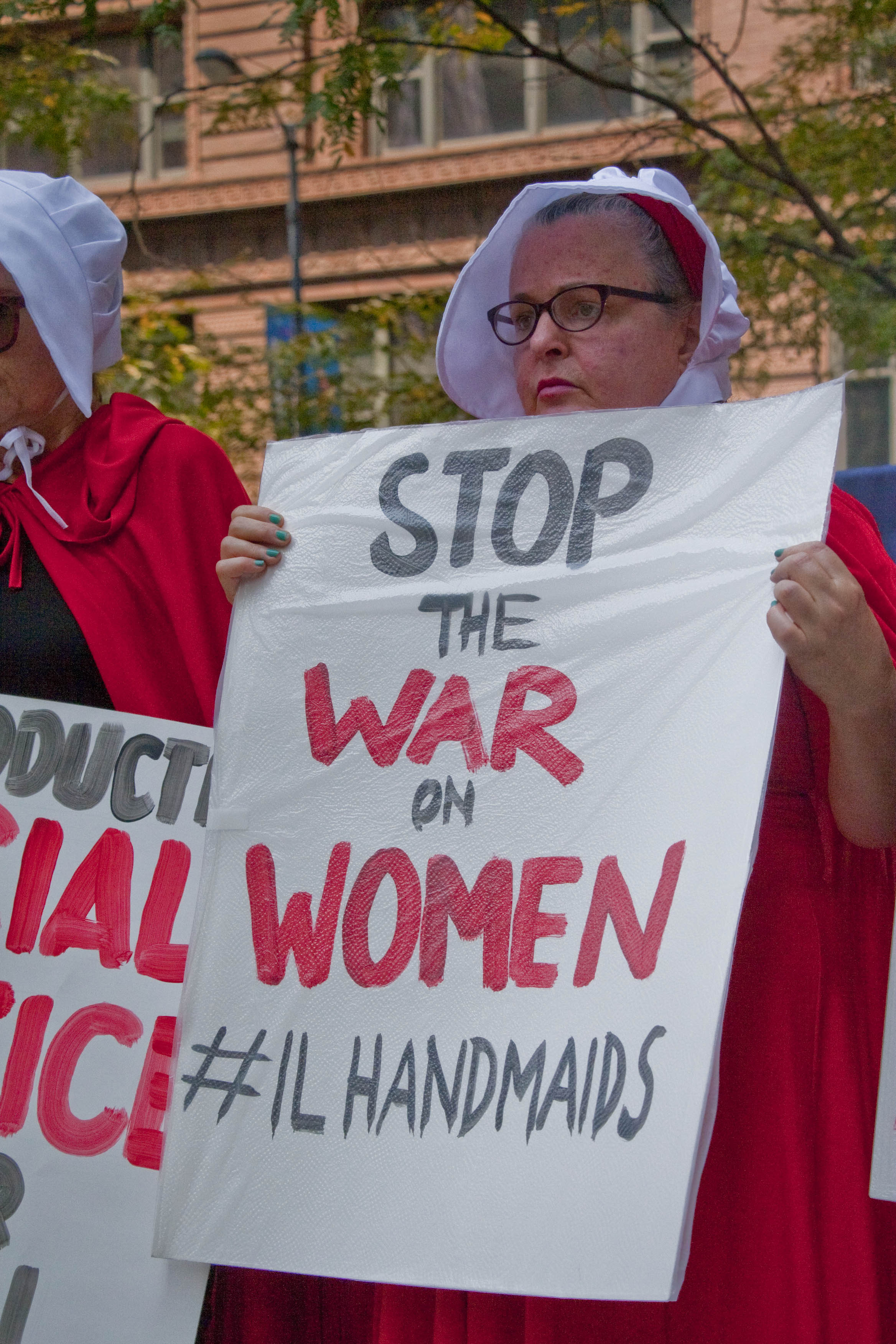
A protestor cosplaying as The Handmaid's Tale using the slogan in 2018

"War on women" is a slogan in United States politics used to describe certain Republican Party policies and legislation as a wide-scale effort to restrict women's rights, especially reproductive rights, including abortion. Prominent Democrats such as Nancy Pelosi and Barbara Boxer, as well as feminists, have used the phrase to criticize proponents of these laws as trying to force their social views on women through legislation. The slogan has been used to describe Republican policies in areas such as access to reproductive health services, particularly birth control and abortion services; the definition of rape for the purpose of the public funding of abortion; the prosecution of criminal violence against women; and workplace discrimination against women.

While used in other contexts, and prior to 2010, it became a common slogan in American political discourse after the 2010 congressional elections. The term is often used to describe opposition to the contraceptive mandate in Obamacare and policies to defund women's health organizations that perform abortions, such as Planned Parenthood. The concept again gained attention in the 2016 U.S. presidential election, when Republican nominee Donald Trump drew notice for a history of inflammatory statements and actions toward women.

The phrase and the concept have been criticized by Republicans and some anti-abortion Democrats. Republican National Committee chairman Reince Priebus described it as an over-simplified fiction advanced by Democrats and the media while other Republicans contended that such rhetoric was used as a distraction from President Barack Obama and the Democrats' handling of the economy. In August 2012, Todd Akin's controversial comments regarding pregnancy and rape sparked renewed media focus on the concept. Republicans have tried to turn the phrase against Democrats by using it to argue hypocrisy for not critiquing sex scandals of members within their party who have cheated, sexted, and harassed women, and for not supporting bills to combat sex-selective abortion.

== Development of the term ==
In 1989, radical feminist Andrea Dworkin wrote in a book introduction about "war on women" and, in 1997, she collected that and other writings in Life and Death, for which the subtitle was Unapologetic Writings on the Continuing War Against Women. Feminist Susan Faludi's 1991 book Backlash: The Undeclared War Against American Women, argued that throughout the 1980s the media created a "backlash" against the feminist advances of the 1970s. Former Republican political consultant Tanya Melich's 1996 memoir, The Republican War Against Women: An Insider's Report from Behind the Lines, describes the incorporation of the anti-abortion movement and opposition to the Equal Rights Amendment by Republicans as a divergence from feminist causes.

George W. Bush's administration met with resistance from feminists and women's rights activists throughout his presidency. In 2004 The Feminist Press published Laura Flanders' collection of essays The W Effect: Bush's War On Women. The same year, Sylvia Federici's Caliban and the Witch used "war on women" as a framework for analysis of the restructuring of gender relations in early modern Europe. In 2006 economist Barbara Finlay's critique of the Bush administration's treatment of women was published by Zed Books under the title George W. Bush and the War on Women: Turning Back the Clock on Progress.

In the 2010 midterm elections, the Republican Party (GOP) won the majority in the House of Representatives. On January 4, 2011, the day after Congress convened, Kaili Joy Gray of the liberal Daily Kos wrote an opinion piece titled "The Coming War on Women". In the article, she outlined many of the measures that Republicans intended to push through the House of Representatives, including personhood laws, fetal pain laws, and the effort to defund Planned Parenthood. In February 2011, an AlterNet article by Sarah Seltzer and Lauren Kelley entitled "9 New laws in the GOP's War on Women" began to document state-level legislation restricting abortion access and rights. That same month, New York Representative Jerrold Nadler referred to the proposed No Taxpayer Funding for Abortion Act, one of the Congress's first actions and one that would have changed policy to allow only victims of "forcible rape" or child sex abuse to qualify for Medicaid funding for abortion, as "an entirely new front in the war on women and their families". Florida Representative and Chair of the Democratic National Committee Debbie Wasserman Schultz began using the term "war on women" in March 2011.

=== Reproductive rights ===
Zerlina Maxwell, in an editorial for U.S. News & World Report, cited these figures from the Guttmacher Institute as evidence of a "war on American women". The findings, according to the Guttmacher Institute, show that state restrictions on abortion greatly increased in 2011.

The "war on women" slogan was used often when describing the unprecedented rise in the passage of provisions related to women's health and reproductive rights in 2011 and 2012. In 2011, state legislatures across the United States introduced over 1100 provisions related to women's health and reproductive rights, and in the first quarter of 2012 an additional 944 provisions were introduced in state legislatures, half of which would restrict access to abortion. Legislation has focused on mandatory ultrasounds, narrowing the time when abortions may be performed and limiting insurance coverage of abortion.

==== Abortion restrictions ====
Democratic strategist Zerlina Maxwell wrote an editorial for U.S. News & World Report in which she cited a Guttmacher Institute analysis showing state legislatures enacted 135 pieces of legislation affecting women's reproductive rights as evidence that the "Republican 'War on Women' is no fiction." The analysis found that between 2000 and 2011, the number of states hostile to abortion rights have increased markedly, and that in 2011 there was an unprecedented rise in the number of provisions passed by state legislatures restricting abortion.

Many states have adopted model legislation written by Americans United for Life, an anti-abortion advocacy group. In June 2011, Charmaine Yoest and Denise M. Burke of Americans United, acknowledged the expression in an op-ed for The Wall Street Journal, writing that "Indiana is being threatened with the loss of federal funding for health care and being held up to scorn as having 'declared war on women.'"

===== Mandatory ultrasounds =====
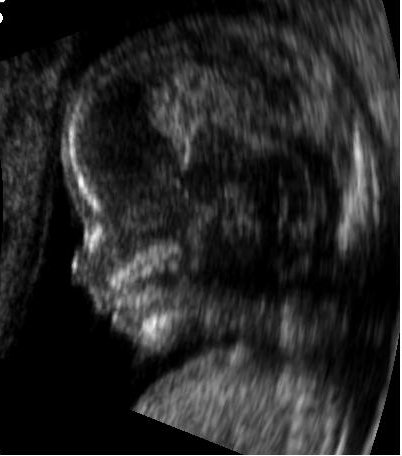
Ultrasound of fetus at 14 weeks (profile)

In 2011 and 2012, "war on women" was used to describe the legislation passed by many states requiring that women seeking abortions first undergo government-mandated ultrasounds. Some states require that women view the image of the fetus and others require that women be offered the opportunity to listen to the fetal heartbeat. Since many women's pregnancies are not far enough along to get an image via a traditional ultrasound, transvaginal ultrasounds, which involve the physician inserting a probe into the woman's vagina, may be required, but these requirements vary state to state. Critics have questioned the value of having a medically unnecessary procedure, and characterized it as similar to some states' legal definition of rape. Writer Megan Carpentier underwent the procedure and indicated that although it was not comparable to being raped, the process was "uncomfortable to the point of being painful, emotionally triggering... and something that no government should force its citizens to undergo to make a political point." However, in an article critical of the assumptions of those on both sides of the issue, sociologist Tracy Weitz, who opposes mandatory ultrasound, notes that "the use of trans-vaginal ultrasounds is routine among abortion providers."

Virginia State legislators passed a bill in 2012 requiring women to have an ultrasound before having an abortion. The legislation, signed by Governor Bob McDonnell, would require that the provider of an abortion make a copy of the fetal image and include it in the file of the patient. In Louisiana, where pregnant women are already required to view ultrasounds of their fetuses before receiving an abortion, lawmakers proposed a bill that would require them to listen to the embryonic/fetal heartbeat as well. Pennsylvania Governor Tom Corbett drew criticism when he said of his state's new mandatory transvaginal ultrasound law that "You can't make anybody watch, okay? Because you just have to close your eyes. As long as it's on the exterior and not the interior."

===== Gestational limits on abortion =====
In June 2013, Representative Trent Franks of Arizona, passed a national bill in the House Judiciary Committee that would ban abortions after the 20th week of pregnancy. The bill did not include exceptions for rape, incest or health of the mother. In responding to the bill's lack of exception for rape victims, Franks stated that "the incidence of rape resulting in pregnancy are very low," which was compared to the controversial statements made by Todd Akin; studies show that the incidence of pregnancy from rape is approximately equal to or higher than the rate from consensual sex. Afterwards, the House Rules Committee added exceptions for rape and incest. Georgia legislators passed HB 954, a "fetal pain bill" criminalizing abortions performed after the 20th week of pregnancy. The bill, which does not contain exemptions for rape or incest, has been referred to as the "women as livestock bill" by opponents after Representative Terry England made a comparison between women seeking abortions for stillborn fetuses to delivering calves and pigs on a farm.

In April 2012, Arizona passed legislation banning abortions occurring 20 weeks after a woman's last menstrual period. A judge from the District Court initially upheld this ban, but the Ninth Circuit Court of Appeals ruled in August 2012 that the ban could not be enforced until an appeal on the law had been decided. The Ninth Circuit then struck down the law as unconstitutional in May 2013. Eight other states, including Nebraska, Alabama, Georgia, Indiana, Idaho and Oklahoma, have passed such bills; unlike Arizona, the gestational age in these states is calculated from fertilization (20 weeks post-fertilization-which means 22 weeks LMP). In 2013, Idaho's ban was struck down as unconstitutional by a federal judge. States such as Ohio have proposed six-week abortion bans, the earliest time embryonic or fetal cardiac activity can usually be detected.

===== Defining the beginning of human personhood =====
In 2011, voters in Mississippi rejected Initiative 26, a measure that would have declared that human life begins at fertilization, which had drawn support from conservative Republicans and Democrats. Critics of the initiative indicated that the law would have made abortion illegal even in cases where the mother's life is in danger.

===== Targeted regulation of abortion providers =====
Since the mid-1990s, the regulatory burden on abortion providers has increased. TRAP laws (Targeted Regulation of Abortion Providers) have been passed in numerous states. In 2015, the United States Supreme Court agreed to an emergency appeal regarding a Texas law that would have shut down 10 of the remaining 19 abortion clinics within the state. Sometime in the fall of 2015, the Supreme Court will decide whether or not to hear the clinics' full appeal of the ruling.

===== Other =====
In February 2011, South Dakota state legislators considered a bill that would expand that state's definition of justifiable homicide to include killings committed by a party other than a pregnant woman for the purpose of preventing harm to a fetus, a measure interpreted by critics as allowing the killing of abortion providers. Similar legislation was considered in Iowa.

Several state legislatures have passed or are considering legislation to prevent parents from suing doctors who fail to warn them of fetal problems, which are sometimes known as wrongful birth lawsuits. Some of the laws, such as one proposed in Arizona, make exceptions for "intentional or grossly negligent acts", while others do not.

A Kansas bill passed March 2012 requires doctors to warn women seeking abortions that they are linked to breast cancer, a claim that has been refuted by the medical community.

In April 2012, Wisconsin Governor Scott Walker signed into law a bill requiring doctors who prescribe the medical abortion pill to have three meetings with patients or be subject to felony charges. Planned Parenthood suspended non-surgical abortions in the state.

==== Birth control ====
Representative Jackie Speier criticizes Rush Limbaugh for his comments about Sandra Fluke.

On January 20, 2012, Health and Human Services' Secretary Kathleen Sebelius announced a mandate requiring that all health plans provide coverage for all contraceptives approved by the FDA as part of preventive health services for women. Following complaints from Catholic bishops, an exception was created for religious institutions whereby an employee of a religious institution that does not wish to provide reproductive health care can seek it directly from the insurance company at no additional cost. Missouri Senator Roy Blunt proposed an amendment (the Blunt Amendment) that would have "allowed employers to refuse to include contraception in health care coverage if it violated their religious or moral beliefs", but it was voted down 51–48 by the U.S. Senate on March 1, 2012. A bill passed by the Arizona House would allow employers to exclude medication used for contraceptive purposes from their health insurance plans.

Sandra Fluke reading a prepared statement for U.S. Congressional testimony, 16 February 2012

In February 2012, Republican Congressman Darrell Issa convened an all-male panel addressing religious freedom and contraceptive mandates for health insurers. He did not allow Sandra Fluke, a Georgetown University Law Center student who was proposed as a witness by the Democrats, to participate in the hearing, arguing that Fluke was not a member of the clergy. Democratic Representatives then staged a separate panel where Fluke was allowed to speak. Later that month, American conservative talk-show host Rush Limbaugh controversially called Sandra Fluke a "slut" and "prostitute" and continued in similar fashion for the next two days. Foster Friess, the billionaire supporting the candidacy of Rick Santorum, suggested in February 2012 that women put aspirin between their knees as a form of contraception. Limbaugh echoed the sentiment, saying he would "buy all of the women at Georgetown University as much aspirin to put between their knees as they want." Nancy Pelosi circulated a petition and asked that Republicans in the House of Representatives disavow the comments by Friess and Limbaugh, which she called "vicious and inappropriate".

==== Defunding Planned Parenthood ====
Several Democrats used the phrase War on Women to criticize the Republican Party after House Republicans passed legislation to cut off funding for Planned Parenthood in February 2011. Texas, Indiana and Kansas have passed legislation in an effort to defund the organization. Arizona, Ohio and New Hampshire are considering similar legislation. In Texas, lawmakers reduced funds for family planning from $111M to $37M. The future of the Women's Health Program in Texas, which receives 90% of its funding from the federal government, is unclear. The Indiana legislature passed a bill restricting Medicaid funds for Planned Parenthood. Indiana Representative Bob Morris later referred to the Girl Scouts of the USA as a tactical arm of Planned Parenthood. A 2011 Kansas statute cut funding to Planned Parenthood.

On January 31, 2012, breast cancer organization Susan G. Komen for the Cure stopped funding Planned Parenthood, citing a congressional investigation by Rep. Cliff Stearns and a newly created internal rule about not funding organizations under any federal, state or local investigation. Four days later, Komen's Board of Directors reversed the decision and announced that it would amend the policy to "make clear that disqualifying investigations must be criminal and conclusive in nature and not political". Several top-level staff members resigned from Komen during the controversy.

==== Defunding international family planning ====
The National Organization for Women (NOW), in the U.S., in 2011, stated its opinion that "the 'war on women' isn't restricted to U.S. women", saying that the House of Representatives planned to "cut ... international family planning assistance.... [to] include the elimination of all U.S. funds designated for UNFPA" (now known as the United Nations Population Fund).

=== Violence against women ===
==== Rape ====
In January 2011, the No Taxpayer Funding for Abortion Act moved to change how rape is treated when used to determine whether abortions qualify for Medicaid funding. Under the language of the bill, only cases of "forcible rape" or child sexual abuse would have qualified. Political activist groups Moveon.org and Emily's List charged that this constituted a Republican attempt to "redefine rape".

In 2014, Michigan law prohibited all public and most private insurers from covering abortions including in cases of rape and incest. It requires women to buy separate insurance and has been called "rape insurance" by opponents because of the possibility that women will need to have separate insurance for an abortion resulting from rape.

Unsuccessful Missouri Republican candidate to the U.S. Senate Todd Akin made controversial comments in August 2012 asserting (falsely) that women who are victims of "legitimate rape" rarely experience pregnancy from rape. While he issued an apology for his comments, they were widely criticized, and they sparked a renewed focus on Republican attitudes towards women and "shift[ed] the national discussion to divisive social issues that could repel swing voters rather than economic issues that could attract them".

There were multiple calls from Republicans for Akin to step down as nominee. The Washington Post reported a "stampede" of Republicans dissociating from Akin. NRSC chairman John Cornyn said the Republican Party would no longer provide him Senate election funding. A campaign spokesman for Mitt Romney and Paul Ryan said both disagreed with Akin's position and would not oppose abortion in instances of rape. Ryan reportedly called Akin to advise him to step aside. RNC Chairman Reince Priebus warned Akin not to attend the upcoming 2012 Republican convention and said he should resign the nomination. He described Akin's comments as "biologically stupid" and "bizarre" and said that "This is not mainstream talk that he's referring to and his descriptions of whatever an illegitimate rape is."

Other Republican candidates in the 2012 election also created controversy with their comments on rape. Indiana Senate candidate Richard Mourdock, when discussing his opposition to exceptions on abortion bans in cases of rape, said, "I think even if life begins in that horrible situation of rape, that it is something that God intended to happen." Tom Smith, the Senate candidate in Pennsylvania, compared pregnancy from rape to pregnancy out of wedlock. Akin, Mourdock, and Smith all lost their races due to backlash from women voters.

==== Military sexual assault ====
Columnist Margery Eagan has said that opposition to reforming the military in order to better prosecute sexual assaults constitutes a war on women. Senator Saxby Chambliss of Georgia was criticized for saying that part of the cause of the sexual assault was young officers' "hormone level created by nature".

==== Domestic violence ====
The renewal of the Violence Against Women Act, which provides for community violence prevention programs and battered women's shelters, was fiercely opposed by conservative Republicans in 2012. The Act was originally passed in 1994 and has been reauthorized by Congress twice. Senate Minority leader Mitch McConnell, who has previously voted against renewal of the Act, said the bill was a distraction from a small business bill. However, in 2013 a strengthened version of the act was passed by Congress with bipartisan support.

=== Financial assistance ===
In February 2011, Ms. magazine charged House Republicans with launching a new "war on women" for their proposal to cut the WIC budget by 10%. The WIC program, which President Barack Obama has called a spending priority, is a federal assistance program for low-income pregnant women, breastfeeding women, and infants and children under the age of five. The program had been running a surplus, primarily due to decreases in the cost of milk, which make up 20% of WIC expenditures, and lower participation than expected. WIC's budget was later cut by 5.2% as part of the bipartisan budget sequestration in 2013.

=== Workplace and pay discrimination ===
In April 2012, Governor Scott Walker's repeal of Wisconsin's Equal Pay Enforcement Act was described by opponents as furthering the "war on women", which became a big issue in his recall election. The Equal Pay Enforcement Act was passed in 2009 in response to the large gap between the wages of men and women in Wisconsin. Among other provisions, it allowed workplace discrimination victims redress in the less costly and more accessible state court system, rather than in federal court. Defending the repeal, Walker stated that the Act had essentially been nothing but a boon for trial lawyers, incentivizing them to sue job creators, including female business owners, and that the law was being used to clog up the legal system in his state. While it is still illegal in Wisconsin to pay women less on the basis of their sex, the repeal was criticized for reinforcing the gender pay gap, a recurrent theme in the struggle for women's rights. Republican State Senator Glenn Grothman said of the repeal, "You could argue that money is more important for men. I think a guy in their first job, maybe because they expect to be a breadwinner someday, may be a little more money-conscious." Law student Sandra Fluke, criticized Grothman's comment, highlighting legislation that supports equal pay for equal work, such as the federal Lilly Ledbetter Fair Pay Act of 2009.

== Public opinion ==
A May 2012 Kaiser Family Foundation poll found that 31 percent of women and 28 percent of men believed there was an ongoing and wide-scale effort to "limit women's reproductive health choices and services". 45 percent of women and 44 percent of men responded that some groups would like to limit these choices and services, but it's not wide‐scale. Democrats were more likely than Republicans to say there is a movement, but the largest gap was between liberal and conservative ideologies. Among those women believing these efforts to be wide-scale, 75 percent saw this as "a bad thing" against 16 percent who saw this as "a good thing". In the same poll, 42 percent of women and men have said they have taken some action in response to what they heard regarding reproductive health issues.

=== Potential negative consequences of the term ===
While the "war on women" rhetoric has been used to target Republican party attacks on women's rights, particularly on issues of reproductive health, research has shown some potential negative impacts of the Democratic party using this terminology. A Cambridge Core study published in 2017 by scholars Simas and Bumgardner found that the use of this rhetoric may steer male voters, particularly liberals who would usually vote for the Democratic party, away from the Democratic party. A study in 2015 by scholars Deckman and McTague found a growth in the gender gap from 7 percentage points in 2008 to 10 between Obama and Romney in 2012. Obama's male vote decreased from 49% in 2008 to 45% in 2012. The Cambridge Core study attributed this decrease to men who embody a concept called "modern sexism," a version of sexism similar to neosexism that focuses on a belief that sex discrimination no longer exists and, as a result, women should receive no special favors or advantages. As the Encyclopedia of Group Processes and Intergroup Relations puts it," Modern sexism manifests itself in terms of downplaying the existence of discrimination against women and resentment of complaints about sexism and efforts to assist women." This compares to a more traditional form of sexism which is focused on gender roles and the exclusion of women from the public sphere. Simas and Bumgardner theorize that Obama's focus on women's issues drove away male voters who were modern sexists and thus found this focus on women's issues to be futile and unfair. In their study, they find that modern sexism significantly increases the likelihood that men vote for Romney. On the other hand, these results do not hold for female voters. These results imply that the use of rhetoric such as the "war on women" narrative which emphasizes women's rights as a salient political category may harm the Democratic party by pushing away Democratically aligned voters who do not prioritize or believe in women's rights as requiring special attention.

=== Potential positive consequences of the term ===
Though some research has shown a negative impact of the adoption of the term "war on women," some research has shown potential positive consequences of the political and public attention that terms like "war on women" bring to issues. One study by Katherine McCabe found that when abortion becomes a salient political topic, voters revert to their pre-existing beliefs on abortion more so than when it is less salient. This contradicts former scholarship showing that voters tend to side with the issue preferences of their party, especially in recent years. This finding may serve as emphasis for the importance of terms like the "war on women" which bring more public attention and salience to issues like abortion, potentially causing more people to vote in line with their beliefs rather than their party's beliefs.

== Political campaigns ==
=== Mark Udall ===
In the Colorado race of the 2014 midterm elections, the Republican candidate Cory Gardner unseated the incumbent Democratic Senator Mark Udall. NARAL Pro-Choice America gives Udall a 100% rating for abortion rights, and Gardner earned a 0% rating. Udall ran a number of television advertisements highlighting his abortion stance, which critics said was a negative campaign that overplayed the "war on women" issue.

Sandra Fluke stood as a candidate in California, losing by 61 to 39.

=== 2012 presidential candidates ===
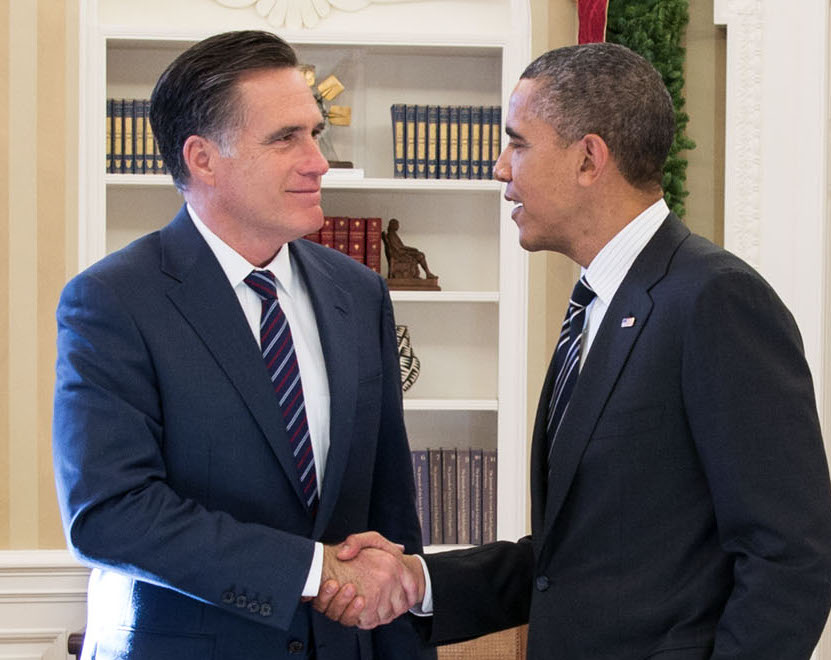
President Barack Obama and Mitt Romney shake hands in the Oval Office.

The "war on women" narrative was particularly salient in the 2012 presidential election because Obama's campaign largely targeted female voters and attempted to spread the narrative that the Republican party and Mitt Romney were out of touch with women's issues. A 2015 Fordham University study by Deckman and McTague studied the effects of the "war on women" narrative and vote choice in the 2012 election with respect to two issues: birth control insurance coverage and abortion attitudes. They found that voters, but particularly women, who supported the Obama administration's birth control mandate were far more likely to vote for Obama than those who didn't. However, abortion attitudes were found not to be a strong predictor of vote choice in this election. This disparity was characterized largely due to a difference in conceptualization of the issues. While abortion was seen more as a moral/cultural issue, the birth control mandate was viewed more as an economic and social welfare issue. Due to these differences, it is difficult to tell whether the "war on women" narrative played a positive or negative role in women's vote choice in the 2012 presidential election.

=== 2014 Democratic candidates ===
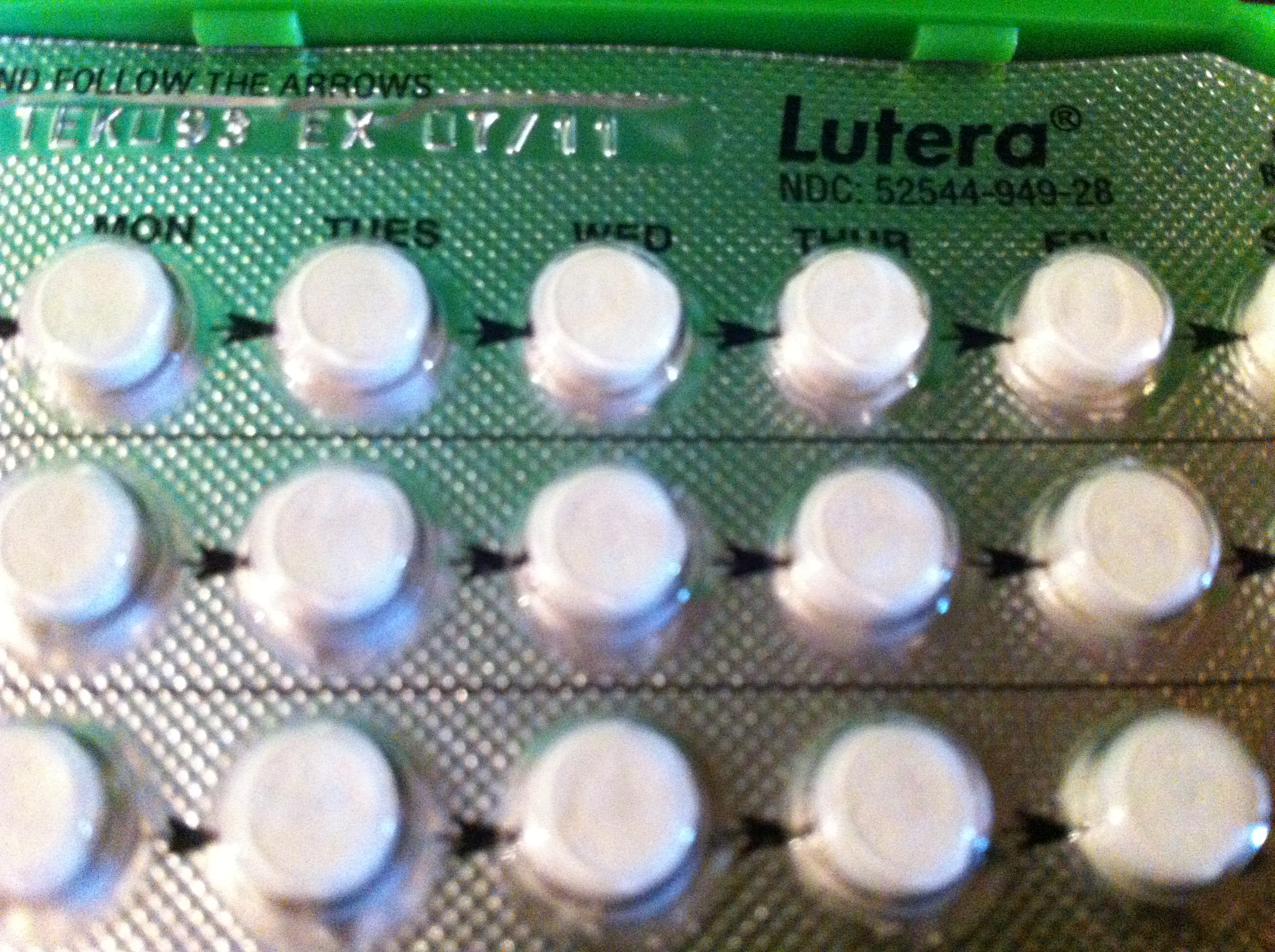
Birth Control Pills

Despite the power of the "war on women" rhetoric in 2012 presidential and congressional elections, the 2014 election cycle saw far less deployment of the term by Democratic candidates. After the 2012 presidential elections experienced the largest gender gap in partisanship based on voting since Gallup began tracking presidential voting behavior in 1952, the Republican party felt the pressure to regain its female voting contingent for the 2014 elections. Many efforts were taken to bring women back to the Republican party and reduce the public perception at that time that the Republican party didn't address women's issues. For one, the Republican party took considerable efforts to dismantle the use of "the war on women" narrative by attempting to show female voters that they did care about women's issues and to highlight instances when the Democratic party demonstrated "anti-woman" behavior. Furthermore, the Republican party attempted to re-attract female voters by taking a pro birth control pill stance, telling voters that they supported birth control pill access over the counter, 24–7. This move was found to be particularly wise by sociology scholar Deana Rohlinger because it "balances religious freedom and women's rights," protecting Republicans' relationship to their religious and socially conservative constituents by continuing to support workplaces in their right to deny birth control access on the basis of religious freedom, but still allowing birth control to be accessible to those who need it. Though these efforts did not close the gender partisan gap in the 2014 elections, they did diminish Democratic candidates use of the "war on women" rhetoric by highlighting Democratic hypocrisy at times and showcasing Republican efforts to support women's issues.

=== 2016 presidential candidates ===
Political analysts have interpreted the 2016 Hillary Clinton presidential campaign as appealing to a female constituency, and have used the phrase "war on women" to describe Republican opposition. Republican presidential candidate Carly Fiorina said "If Hillary Clinton were to face a female nominee, there are a whole set of things that she won't be able to talk about. She won't be able to talk about being the first woman president. She won't be able to talk about a war on women without being challenged. She won't be able to play the gender card."

Donald Trump, a Republican candidate for the 2016 Presidency attended a Fox News debate in August 2015, where Megyn Kelly asked him about how he would respond to a Hillary Clinton campaign saying that he was waging a "war on women". In a later interview with Don Lemon on CNN Tonight, Trump said that Kelly is a "lightweight" and had "blood coming out of her eyes, blood coming out of her wherever". Trump tweeted that his remark referred to Kelly's "nose" but was interpreted by critics as a reference to menstruation. RedState editor Erick Erickson cancelled Trump's invitation to a RedState meeting, saying "there are just real lines of decency a person running for President should not cross".

== Reaction ==
=== Response from Republicans ===
Critics of the term have denied that a war on women exists and some have suggested that it is a ploy to influence women voters. Reince Priebus, the Chairman of the RNC, referred to the War as a "fiction", saying: "If the Democrats said we had a war on caterpillars and every mainstream media outlet talked about the fact that Republicans have a war on caterpillars, then we'd have problems with caterpillars." Republican Representative Cathy McMorris Rodgers called the war a myth, saying "It's an effort to drive a political wedge in an election year." Referring to the 2010 elections and Nancy Pelosi, she said that "It could be argued that the women actually unelected the first woman Speaker of the House." South Carolina Governor Nikki Haley said in 2012 "There is no war on women. Women are doing well." Republican Representative Paul Ryan mocked the idea of a Republican War on Women, saying "Now it's a war on women; tomorrow it's going to be a war on left-handed Irishmen or something like that."

Republican Senator Lisa Murkowski countered the criticism from her fellow party members, challenging them to "go home and talk to your wife and your daughters" if they did not think there was a war on women, saying "It makes no sense to make this attack on women."

After the 2012 rape and pregnancy controversies, Republican strategists met with aides of Republican figures to advise them on how to run against female candidates.

=== Democratic sexual harassment scandals ===
Members of the Democratic Party, both prominent and local, have been accused of participating in the war on women. In a column for USA Today, Glenn Reynolds wrote in July 2013 that "most of the action in the war on women seems to be coming from the Democratic front," referring to the allegations of sexual harassment against San Diego mayor Bob Filner, the Anthony Weiner sexting scandal, and the Eliot Spitzer prostitution scandal. The Republican National Senatorial Committee has also used these scandals in press releases, tying Democratic Senators in Iowa and New Hampshire to the allegations.

The messaging from Republicans was described as unlikely to be effective by Garance Franke-Ruta in The Atlantic because "[the War on Women] was an argument about Republican policies on women ... rather than about reprehensible individual behavior." Noting that many of the targets are not on upcoming ballots, Franke-Ruta continued by saying the Republican Party "is going to need its own pro-active framework for thinking about what is happening in America and why women have been drawn to Democrats in numbers that matter in key elections."

=== Other reactions ===
Jonathan Alter characterized the phrase as an "alliterative but unfair notion".

David Weigel called for "a moment of silence" in his article entitled "The 'War on Women' Is Over: The life cycle of a political talking point, from birth to adolescence to death." In it he explained his understanding of the stages in the "life cycle" of the Democratic "talking point".

Molly Redden wrote an article for Mother Jones entitled "The War on Women is Over -- and Women Lost". She described the difficulties faced by abortion providers: "Activists have been calling it the 'war on women.' But the onslaught of new abortion restrictions has been so successful, so strategically designed, and so well coordinated that the war in many places has essentially been lost."

Camille Paglia has called the term "war on women" a "tired cliché that is as substance-less as a druggy mirage but that the inept GOP has never been able to counter."

== See also ==
- Antifeminism
- Culture war
- Birth control movement in the United States
- War as metaphor
- Forced pregnancy
