= Gina Loudon =

American conservative author, anchor, columnist, show host, and news commentator

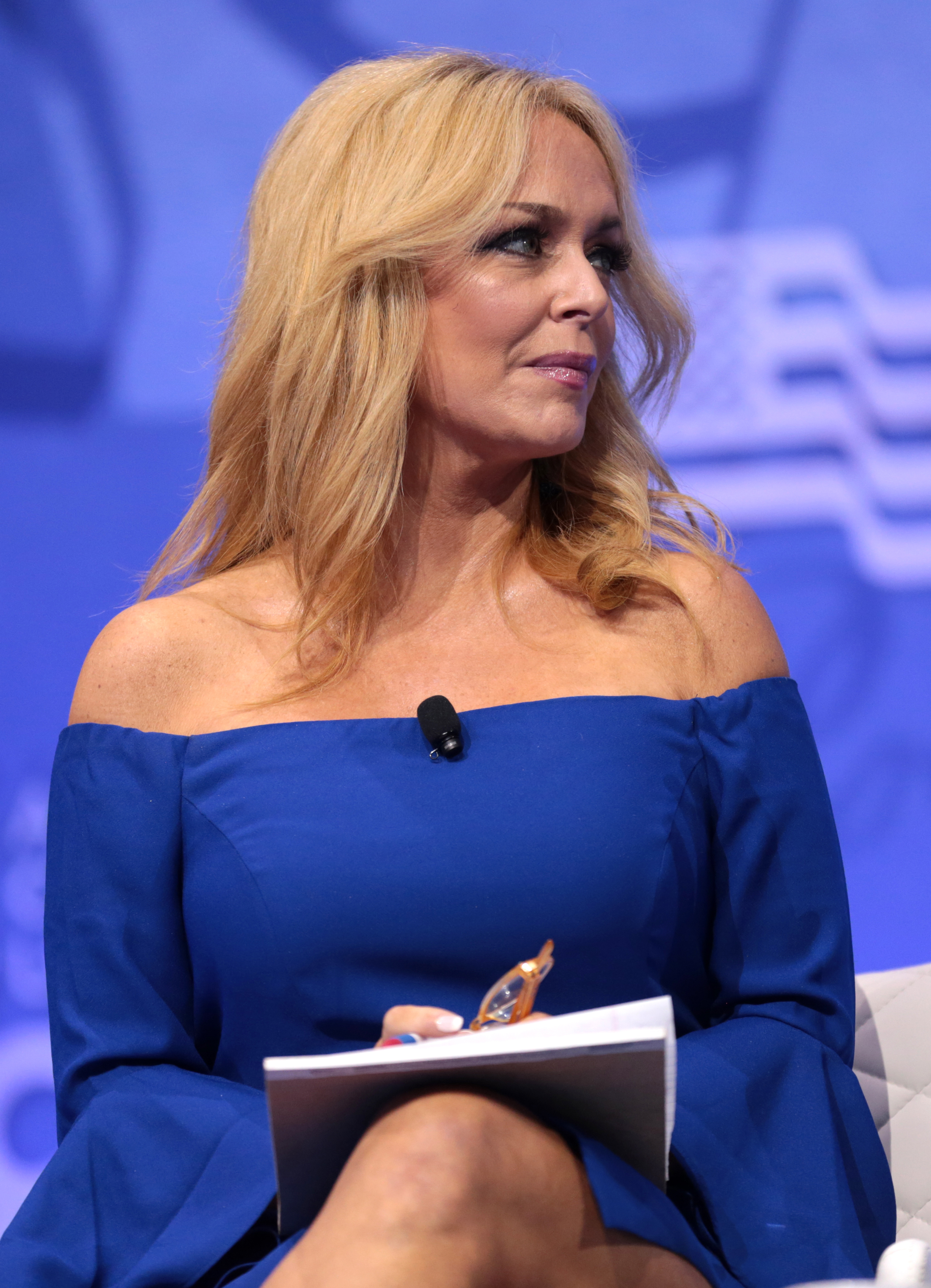
- Loudon in 2017
- Born: Gina Gentry; 1968 (age 57–58); Missouri, U.S.
- Occupations: Author; commentator
- Political party: Republican
- Spouse: John William Loudon
- Children: 5
- Website: drginaloudon.com

Gina Loudon (born 1968) known as Dr. Gina, is a conservative media personality. She was a member of the 2020 Donald Trump campaign's media advisory board and the co-chair of Women for Trump 2020. She is a member at Mar-a-Lago and the current face of Citizen Voters Inc.

She has said that scientific evidence shows President Trump to be "the most sound-minded person to ever occupy the White House." In 2018, The Daily Beast reported that Loudon's book falsely described her as having a PhD in psychology; she has a PhD in human and organization systems from Fielding Graduate University, an online school. On October 8, 2019, Loudon filed a libel suit against The Daily Beast in New York County Supreme Court. The suit was voluntarily dismissed with prejudice with both parties paying for their own court costs on April 8, 2020.

== Career ==
=== Radio and television ===
Loudon hosted a radio talk show on KJSL in St. Louis, Missouri, and WYDE-FM in Alabama. She also hosted a television show called America Trends on the Youtoo America TV Channel that aired on Time Warner Cable and Comcast. On December 1, 2020, Loudon began hosting her own 7pm EST/4pm PST show on Real America's Voice, Dr. Gina Prime Time. The show ended on January 13, 2023. Loudon currently co-hosts American Sunrise on Real America's Voice.

=== Appearance on Wife Swap ===
In 2013, Loudon and her husband, former Missouri state senator John William Loudon, appeared on the show Wife Swap when they swapped with a polyamorous and bisexual family. Loudon was the first wife to ever walk off of the set.

=== Politics ===
In her 2018 book Mad Politics: Keeping Your Sanity in a World Gone Crazy, Loudon wrote that she has scientific evidence showing Trump to be "the most sound-minded person to ever occupy the White House." Loudon has neither a psychology degree nor a license to practice clinical psychology. Trump endorsed her book in September 2018, tweeting "Gina is Great!" At the time, the book was ranked No. 436,949 in Amazon's bestsellers rank. Shortly after the tweet, the book ranking jumped to 2,590.

=== Education ===
In 2020, Loudon was announced as a member of the board of directors of Chula Vista Christian University, a private nondenominational Christian university in Chula Vista, California.

== Personal life ==
Loudon met her husband while she was attending William Woods University. They married in 1990 at Westminster College in Fulton, Missouri, his alma mater. Loudon and her husband are Presbyterian. The Loudon family have five children, and currently reside in Lake Worth Beach, Florida. Her son Bo is a conservative podcaster and friend of Barron Trump.

She gave the commencement address at her alma mater, William Woods University, in 2015.

The Daily Beast reported that Loudon's book falsely claimed that she has a PhD in psychology. Loudon does have a PhD in human and organization systems from Fielding Graduate Institute (now the Fielding Graduate University), an online school. A personal assistant for Loudon responded to the reports, saying that Loudon's PhD was in the field of psychology. The publishing company, Regnery, told the outlet that they were responsible for several misleading statements about Loudon's qualifications, including referring to her as "America's favorite psychological expert".
