= Jeremy LaFaver =

American politician (born 1978)

Member of the Missouri House of Representatives from the 25th district
- In office January 2013 – January 2017
- Preceded by: Jason Kander
- Succeeded by: Greg Razer

Personal details
- Born: May 11, 1978 (age 48)
- Party: Democratic
- Education: Kansas State University

Jeremy LaFaver (born May 11, 1978) is an American former politician who served as a Democratic member of the Missouri House of Representatives from the 25th district from 2013 to 2017. The district covers part of Kansas City in Jackson County.

== Early life and career ==
LaFaver earned a bachelor's degree from Kansas State University. From 2005 to 2007, he served in the Peace Corps as a community health education volunteer in Turkmenistan, where he became nearly fluent in Turkmen. Before entering the legislature, he worked as a child advocate and director of public policy at Kansas City's Partnership for Children, where his efforts contributed to legislation in the Missouri General Assembly benefiting at-risk children and low-income seniors. He has also volunteered with the American Red Cross, Big Brothers/Big Sisters, Operation Breakthrough, and as a Court Appointed Special Advocate in Jackson County.

== Missouri House of Representatives ==
LaFaver was first elected to the Missouri House of Representatives in November 2012, succeeding Jason Kander, and was re-elected in 2014. In November 2015, Speaker of the House Todd Richardson appointed him to the board of directors of the Missouri Children's Trust Fund.

In August 2013, LaFaver was arrested in Boone County by the Missouri State Highway Patrol and cited for possession of less than 35 grams of marijuana, possession of drug paraphernalia, and failure to appear on earlier traffic violations. He had previously co-sponsored House Bill 512, which would have made possession of small amounts of marijuana a non-arrestable offense; the bill did not pass. Following the arrest, LaFaver resigned as chair of the House Democratic Victory Committee but declined to step down from his House seat, stating that he had made "a serious mistake" and apologizing for the embarrassment caused to his family and constituents.

== Departure from office ==
In February 2016, LaFaver announced he would not seek a third term, citing a desire to spend more time with his young family. He was succeeded by Democrat Greg Razer, who ran unopposed in both the primary and general elections of 2016.
