= John C. Willke =

American anti-abortion activist (1925–2015)

- Born: John Charles Willke; April 5, 1925; Maria Stein, Ohio, U.S.
- Died: February 20, 2015 (aged 89); Cincinnati, Ohio, U.S.
- Known for: Anti-abortion activist and former President of the National Right to Life Committee
- Spouse: Barbara Jean Willke (m. 1948; died 2013)
- Scientific career
- Fields: Physician

John Charles Willke (April 5, 1925 – February 20, 2015) was an American author, physician, and anti-abortion activist. He served as president of National Right to Life and, along with his wife Barbara, authored a number of books on abortion and human sexuality. Willke was a leading promoter of the false claim that women's bodies resist pregnancy from forcible rape, an idea which continues to be promoted by some anti-abortion politicians.

== Life and career ==
Willke was born in Maria Stein, Ohio, the son of Marie Margaret (Wuennemann) and Gerald Thomas Willke. He graduated from Roger Bacon High School in 1942 and earned his M.D. from the University of Cincinnati in 1948. In 1948, he married Barbara Hiltz, a nurse. Willke worked as a family physician in Cincinnati, Ohio, and was on the staff of the formerly named Providence and Good Samaritan hospitals. He stopped practicing medicine in 1988 in order to devote himself full-time to the anti-abortion movement.

In the 1950s and 60s, Willke and his wife taught abstinence-only sex education courses for the Catholic Church and became increasingly concerned by the abortion-rights movement. In the early 1970s, he founded Right to Life of Greater Cincinnati along with his wife to lobby against Roe v. Wade. In 1971, Willke and his wife wrote Handbook on Abortion, which sold over a million copies and was influential in the anti-abortion movement. Willke's use of graphic photography pioneered its prominence in anti-abortion materials. The book promoted the false belief that rape could not result in pregnancy, and claimed that women often fabricated accusations of rape.

In 1980, he became president of National Right to Life, the nation's oldest and largest anti-abortion organization. In the 1990s, Willke shifted the focus of his arguments away from fetal personhood and instead sought to present the anti-abortion movement as "compassionate to women", in response to opinion polling and test marketing which convinced him that this would be a more effective strategy.

== Views on pregnancy via rape ==
Willke was a proponent of the concept that female rape victims have physiologic defenses against pregnancy, and thus that women rarely become pregnant after a sexual assault. Willke wrote in Christian Life Resources in 1999: "There's no greater emotional trauma that can be experienced by a woman than an assault rape. This can radically upset her possibility of ovulation, fertilization, implantation and even nurturing of a pregnancy". Willke claimed that for what he called "forcible rape" or "assault rape" (which Willke defined as separate from statutory rape) pregnancy is rare, resulting in only approximately four pregnancies per state per year. Research published in the Journal of American Obstetrics and Gynecology concluded rape "is a cause of many unwanted pregnancies". A separate study of 405 female rape victims of reproductive age found 6.4% became pregnant.

In an interview on August 20, 2012, following the Todd Akin rape and pregnancy controversy, Willke said: "This is a traumatic thing—she's, shall we say, she's uptight. She is frightened, tight, and so on. And sperm, if deposited in her vagina, are less likely to be able to fertilize. The tubes are spastic." Willke's assertions were dismissed as false and outlandish by experts in obstetrics and gynecology. The American Congress of Obstetricians and Gynecologists stated that rape victims had no control over whether they became pregnant, adding that "to suggest otherwise contradicts basic biological truths". Michael Greene, a professor of obstetrics, gynecology, and reproductive health at Harvard Medical School, dismissed Willke's claims by saying: "There are no words for this—it is just nuts."

== Political affiliations ==
Mitt Romney's 2008 presidential campaign embraced Willke as "an important surrogate for Governor Romney's pro-life and pro-family agenda", and Romney expressed pride to "have the support of a man who has meant so much to the pro-life movement in our country."

After Todd Akin, a U.S. representative from Missouri, made a controversial remark about rape and pregnancy, stating "legitimate rape" rarely results in pregnancy, Willke publicly defended Akin, saying he believed Akin meant to say "forcible rape" not "legitimate rape". The congressman was facing criticism over the phrase "legitimate rape", which was taken to suggest some forms or rape are acceptable. Akin confirmed he misspoke and that Willke was correct in that he did mean to say "forcible rape".

In August 2012, Willke wrote Mitt Romney a letter in which he wrote, "It's time for Republican leaders to rise to the level of Rep. Akin's principle and courage and stand with him and the Republican platform that stands for the protection of every human life." Willke told the Washington bureau of The Daily Telegraph that he had met with Romney during his 2012 presidential campaign, and Romney had praised him saying, "thank you for your support – we agree on almost everything, and if I am elected President I will make some major pro-life pronouncements."

== Books and booklets ==
- Handbook on Abortion ISBN 978-0910728140 First published in 1971, the Handbook on Abortion is an anti-abortion booklet written and published by Willke and his wife. The booklet has been widely distributed, republished, and translated, and has been influential in shaping anti-abortion thought, according to journalist Linda Greenhouse.
- Abortion and Slavery: History Repeats ISBN 978-0685087824
- How to Teach Children the Wonder of Sex: a guide for parents and teachers ISBN 978-0910728171
- Assisted Suicide & Euthanasia, Past & Present ISBN 978-0910728225
- Abortion, Questions and Answers: Why Can't We Love Them Both ISBN 978-0318351650
- Abortion and the Pro-life Movement: An Inside View (2014)
