= Rape and pregnancy statement controversies in the 2012 United States elections =

During the 2012 United States election cycle, in federal and state elections, a series of controversies arose as a result of statements by Republican Party candidates about rape, pregnancy, contraception, abortion, and related topics. The first and most widely covered controversy concerned Republican U.S. Senate candidate Representative Todd Akin of Missouri, who stated that pregnancy rarely occurs as a result of what he called "legitimate rape". Medical experts said Akin's statement is false, and many women's rights groups found the phrase "legitimate rape" demeaning. Akin's comments had a far-reaching political impact, changing the focus of political campaigns across the country to the war on women. Akin was eventually denounced by politicians in both the Republican and Democratic parties, most prominently by presidential candidate Mitt Romney and President Barack Obama; he lost the election on November 6 to Democratic incumbent Claire McCaskill.

Following Akin's comments, additional controversies arose around other remarks made by various Republican politicians. The most notable of these was by Indiana State Treasurer and US Senate nominee Richard Mourdock, who said that life was "something that God intended", even if the pregnancy was due to rape. Some analysts identified the controversies around Mourdock's and Akin's comments, and those of other candidates, as a principal factor in their election losses. The comments may have had an effect on the national election results; many female voters supported Democratic presidential candidate Barack Obama.

== Background ==
In some cases, it has been claimed by anti-abortion activists that pregnancy from rape is either rare or impossible. This is an incorrect assertion; studies repeatedly show that any female capable of ovulation may become pregnant after rape by a fertile male, and the prevalence of pregnancy from rape is the same or greater than pregnancy from consensual sex.

Rape leads to tens of thousands of pregnancies each year. In a three-year longitudinal study of 4,000 American women, physician Melisa Holmes found that forced sexual intercourse causes over 32,000 pregnancies in the United States each year. That study revealed a pregnancy rate among women aged 12–45 of 5% of rapes and 6% of victims. A 1987 study also found a 5% pregnancy rate from rape of 18- to 24-year-old higher education students in the US. A 2005 study places the rape-related pregnancy rate at around 3–5%. Physician Felicia H. Stewart and economist James Trussell estimated that 333,000 assaults and rapes reported in the US in 1998 caused about 25,000 pregnancies, and that up to 22,000 of those pregnancies could have been prevented by prompt medical treatment, such as emergency contraception. A study of Ethiopian adolescents who reported being raped found that 17% subsequently became pregnant, and rape crisis centers in Mexico reported the figure at 15–18%. Estimates of rape-related pregnancy rates may be low since the crime is under-reported, so some pregnancies from rape are not recorded as such.

This discredited theory regarding the rarity of pregnancy from rape was popularized by Fred Mecklenburg in 1972. While serving as assistant clinical professor of Obstetrics and Gynecology at the University of Minnesota Medical School, Mecklenburg published an article entitled "The Indications for Induced Abortion: A Physician's Perspective". He wrote that pregnancy resulting from rape is "extremely rare", that during rape sexual intercourse is not always successfully completed, that the probability of rape coinciding with a woman's ovulation period is low, and that rape-induced trauma impedes ovulation.

Although it is false, the idea that trauma might function as a form of birth control has been advanced by anti-abortion activists attempting to secure an unqualified ban on abortion. For example, the former President of the National Right to Life Committee and physician John C. Willke wrote in a 1985 text that when undergoing rape, the female body can physiologically prevent conception. Revisiting his statement in a 1999 article, published in the Life Issues Connector, Willke wrote, "There's no greater emotional trauma that can be experienced by a woman than an assault rape ... This can radically upset her possibility of ovulation, fertilization and implantation." Willke, whose 1999 article has been posted on an anti-abortion website, said in August 2012 that rape, "is a traumatic thing" and women undergoing rape are "frightened, tight and so on. And sperm, if deposited in her vagina, are less likely to be able to fertilize. The tubes are spastic."

Similar statements on rape and pregnancy continued to be made at times prior to the election. In 1975, Republican Senator Dewey F. Bartlett, tabling an unsuccessful legislative amendment to withdraw state funding for abortions, said, "A person who is raped very seldom becomes pregnant. Statistics show it is very rare." Pennsylvania state representative Stephen Freind said in 1988 that the odds of a pregnancy resulting from rape were "one in millions and millions and millions". James Leon Holmes published a letter in 1980 stating, "concern for rape victims is a red herring because conceptions from rape occur with approximately the same frequency as snowfall in Miami". In 1995, North Carolina House of Representatives member Henry Aldridge said during a debate to eliminate a state abortion fund for poor women, "The facts show that people who are raped—who are truly raped—the juices don't flow, the body functions don't work and they don't get pregnant. Medical authorities agree that this is a rarity, if ever." In 1998, Arkansas state senator Fay Boozman lost a campaign for a US Senate seat after saying that fear-induced hormonal changes made rape victims unlikely to become pregnant.

== Todd Akin ==
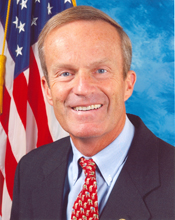
Rep. Todd Akin (R-MO)

Todd Akin, a long-time anti-abortion activist, served as a Republican member of the House of Representatives for Missouri's 2nd congressional district from 2001 until 2013. On August 7, 2012, Akin won the Republican primary to become his party's nominee for the U.S. Senate election in Missouri. On August 19, Akin said that victims of what he termed "legitimate rape" rarely become pregnant. He said this during an interview aired on the St. Louis television station KTVI-TV when asked whether women who are raped and become pregnant should have the option of abortion. He replied:

Well you know, people always want to try to make that as one of those things, well how do you, how do you slice this particularly tough sort of ethical question. First of all, from what I understand from doctors, that's really rare. If it's a legitimate rape, the female body has ways to try to shut that whole thing down. But let's assume that maybe that didn't work or something. I think there should be some punishment, but the punishment ought to be on the rapist and not attacking the child.

Akin's comments almost immediately led to uproar. The term "legitimate rape" was called "loathsome" because it suggests that "there are different categories of rape — some real and awful and others that are not". Others took exception to the phrasing because it suggests that rape victims who become pregnant are likely to be lying. Akin's words were based on long-discredited pseudoscience; experts said the claims lacked any medical validity. Senior figures in both parties condemned Akin's remarks and some called for him to resign his seat or abandon his Senate candidacy.

Akin apologized after making the comment, saying he "misspoke", and that he planned to remain in the Senate race. He stated that by "legitimate rape" he meant "forcible rape", saying, "I was talking about forcible rape ... I used the wrong word". Akin's congressional record showed support for limits to abortion, such as co-sponsoring a bill that would make abortion illegal even in the case of rape.

Akin responded to the comments by issuing a press release stating:

As a member of Congress, I believe that working to protect the most vulnerable in our society is one of my most important responsibilities, and that includes protecting both the unborn and victims of sexual assault. In reviewing my off-the-cuff remarks, it's clear that I misspoke in this interview and it does not reflect the deep empathy I hold for the thousands of women who are raped and abused every year. Those who perpetrate these crimes are the lowest of the low in our society and their victims will have no stronger advocate in the Senate to help ensure they have the justice they deserve.

On August 21, he issued a television commercial in which he said:

Rape is an evil act. I used the wrong words in the wrong way and for that I apologize. As the father of two daughters, I want tough justice for predators. I have a compassionate heart for the victims of sexual assault, and I pray for them. The fact is, rape can lead to pregnancy. The truth is, rape has many victims. The mistake I made was in the words I said, not in the heart I hold. I ask for your forgiveness.

In relation to the resulting furore over his original "legitimate rape" comment, Akin said: "I talk about one word, one sentence, one day out of place, and, all of a sudden, the entire establishment turns on you."

Akin later wrote a book, Firing Back: Taking on the Party Bosses and Media Elite to Protect Our Faith and Freedom (published July 2014), in which he stated that he regretted apologizing for these remarks, because, "by asking the public at large for forgiveness, I was validating the willful misinterpretation of what I had said". He said that he meant "legitimate rape" as an abbreviated form of "legitimate case of rape". He also reiterated that he believed a woman's body would prevent conception if she had been raped, due to impact of stress on fertilization. He criticized members of his party for disavowing him, including Karl Rove, former National Republican Senatorial Committee Executive Director Rob Jesmer, Senators Mitch McConnell, John Cornyn, John McCain, Roy Blunt, and Lindsey Graham, and House Speaker John Boehner, and what he referred to as the "liberal media" for supposed double standards, comparing his candidacy to that of George Allen, derailed due to Allen's use of a racist slur.

=== Response ===
Senior Republicans strongly condemned Akin's remarks. The party's presidential nominee, Mitt Romney, said they were "inexcusable, insulting, and frankly, wrong", and called for Akin to step down; Paul Ryan, Romney's vice presidential nominee, echoed this call. The National Republican Senatorial Committee (NRSC) said that "if he continues with this misguided campaign, it will be without the support and resources of the NRSC". Republican Senate Minority Leader Mitch McConnell said Akin's remarks were "totally inexcusable" and "wildly offensive". Conservative commentators Sean Hannity, Charles Krauthammer and Mark Levin called for Akin to step aside, as did the editorial teams of the Wall Street Journal and National Review, nine sitting US Senators, and five Republican senators from Missouri—former senators John Danforth, Kit Bond, James Talent and John Ashcroft, and incumbent Roy Blunt. Fellow Republican Congressmen and Senate hopefuls Jeff Flake and Denny Rehberg also called for Akin's resignation. The Republican Political Action Committee American Crossroads said it would cut off all aid to Akin's candidacy. Immediately after the comment, Scott Ross of NBC said that Akin's comments affected his Senate candidacy.

Republicans made multiple calls for Akin to step down as nominee. The Washington Post reported Republicans dissociating themselves from Akin as a means of damage control. NRSC chairman John Cornyn said the Republican Party would no longer provide Akin with Senate election funding and that Akin was "endangering Republicans' hopes of retaking the majority in the Senate". In August, when the comments were made, Nate Silver gave the Republicans over a 60 percent chance of gaining a majority in the Senate. During the controversy, Republican party officials said that Akin's remarks had shifted "the national discussion to divisive social issues that could repel swing voters rather than economic issues that could attract them in a climate of high unemployment and stumbling recovery". A campaign spokesman for Mitt Romney and Paul Ryan said both candidates disagreed with Akin's statement and that if elected, their administration would not oppose abortion in instances of rape. Ryan telephoned Akin to advise him to step aside. RNC Chairman Reince Priebus warned Akin not to attend the upcoming 2012 Republican convention and said he should resign the nomination. Priebus described Akin's comments as "biologically stupid" and "bizarre" and said that, "This is not mainstream talk that he's referring to and his descriptions of whatever an illegitimate rape is. We're hoping he hears [these calls to drop out of the race]".

Some social conservative organizations, including the Family Research Council defended Akin. A spokesman for the Council said, "We feel this is a case of gotcha politics ... We know who Todd Akin is. We've worked with him up on the hill. He's a defender of life." A representative of the American Family Association cited Willke's 1999 article and said Akin "was exactly right". In response to Republican demands that Akin resign, Personhood USA spokeswoman Jennifer Mason said that Akin's position "is an integral part of the Republican Party platform, the same position that was held by President Ronald Reagan" and that "[we] are left with Reagan Republicans, who agree with the Republican Party platform on abortion, and Romney Republicans, a fringe group of liberals who compromise on human life". Mike Huckabee supported Akin by soliciting donations for his Senate campaign and accused the Republican establishment of a "carefully orchestrated and systematic attack". He was also critical of the Republican Senatorial Committee for demanding Akin's resignation.

Iowa Republican congressman Steve King supported Akin during the controversy, saying that Akin "is a strong Christian man, with a wonderful family". King answered a question about Medicaid's coverage for abortions for victims of rape and incest, saying "I just haven't heard of that being a circumstance that's been brought to me in any personal way, and I'd be open to discussion about that subject matter." King's comments were condemned by multiple sources, and others drew attention to their similarity to Akin's remarks. Controversy over Akin's comments ignited again after the election, when fellow Republican Representative Phil Gingrey, who is also an obstetrician, said Akin's comments were "partly right" when he said women's bodies can avoid pregnancy in cases of rape. Gingrey also said that he "delivered lots of babies" and "[knew] about these things". Gingrey also said he found nothing wrong with distinguishing "legitimate rape" from non-legitimate rape, which he defined as a false accusation. His office released a statement that said, "In my attempt to provide context as to what I presumed they meant, my position was misconstrued."

President Barack Obama responded to Akin's comments by saying "Rape is rape ... And the idea that we should be parsing and qualifying and slicing what types of rape we're talking about doesn't make sense to the American people and certainly doesn't make sense to me." Akin's opponent in the Senate campaign, Senator Claire McCaskill, said, "It is beyond comprehension that someone can be so ignorant about the emotional and physical trauma brought on by rape". Democratic members started a petition to remove Akin from the science committee.

Despite intense pressure to step aside, Akin resolved to remain in the race. On The Sean Hannity Show, he said he, "was calling you and letting you know that I'm announcing today that we're [staying] in." On the Mike Huckabee Show he said, "Rape is never legitimate ... I used the wrong words in the wrong way." A national poll conducted by Angus Reid Public Opinion showed that 84% of Americans disagreed with Akin's comments about "legitimate rape", and that 63% wanted him to drop out of the U.S. Senate race.

Akin's comments were widely thought to be the main reason he lost the senatorial election. Exit polls reported that 64% of voters said that Akin's comment was important in their voting decision, and among those voters 74% voted for Claire McCaskill while 18% voted for Akin. According to Jennifer Haberkorn of Politico, Akin lost his election bid because of a backlash from women voters. A poll released on August 23 by Rasmussen Reports showed a steep drop in support for Akin among Missouri voters; McCaskill led Akin in this poll by roughly 10 points. Akin had earlier been in the lead. Akin's comments encouraged new debates on the war on women. Political analysts drew attention to Akin's co-sponsorship of anti-abortion bills with vice presidential candidate Paul Ryan, and the Obama campaign tried to link Ryan to Akin's remarks. James Rowley of Businessweek wrote that the incident had drawn attention to the Republican Party's advocacy for a total ban on abortion.

== Richard Mourdock ==
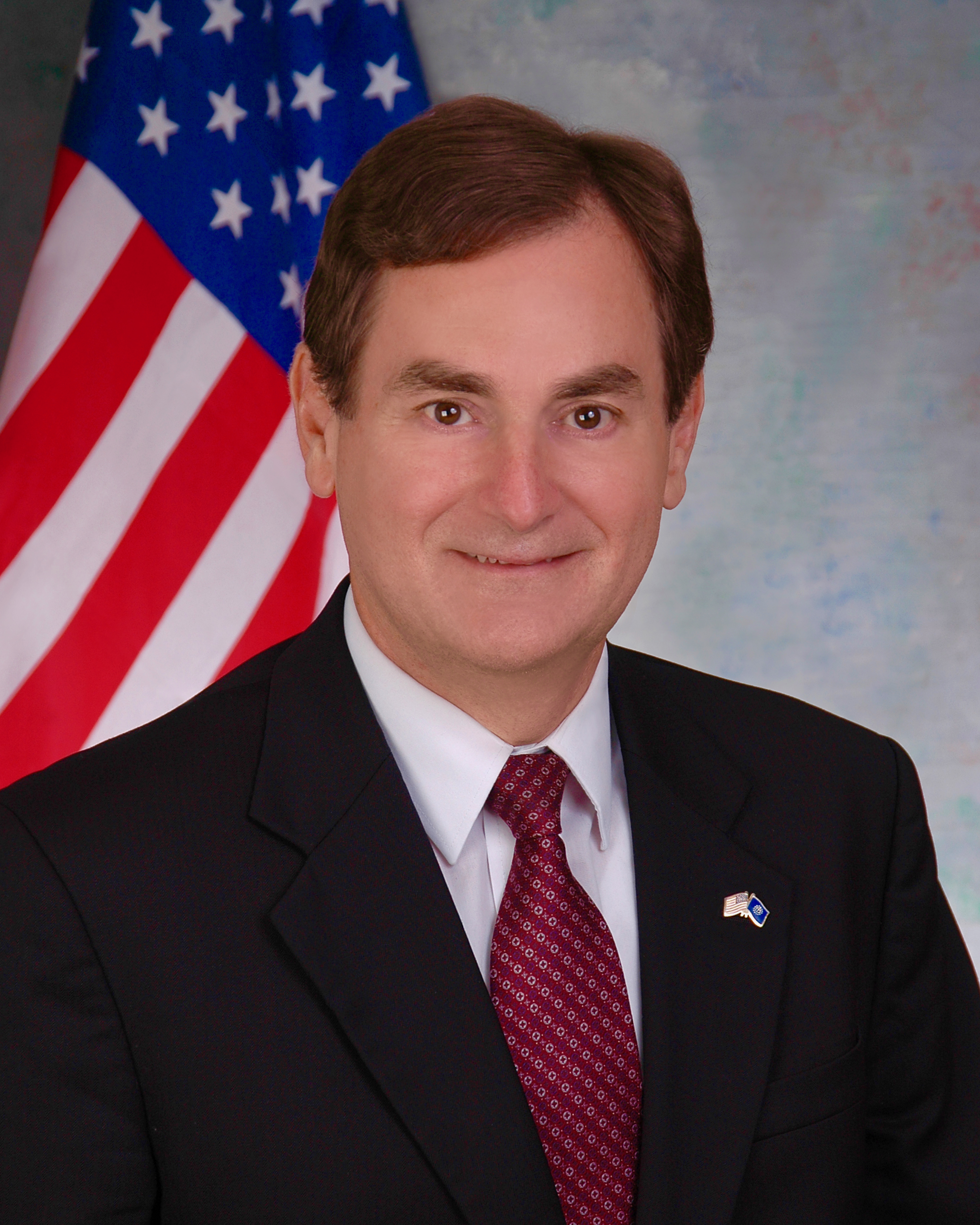
Indiana State Treasurer Richard Mourdock (R-IN)

Richard Mourdock was the Indiana State Treasurer and 2012 Republican Senate nominee who had defeated six-term incumbent U.S. Senator Richard Lugar in the May 2012 Republican primary election with support from the Tea Party movement. On October 23, 2012, two weeks before the election, Mourdock was asked about abortion during a debate with Democratic nominee Joe Donnelly. He said:

I know there are some who disagree and I respect their point of view but I believe that life begins at conception. The only exception I have to have an abortion is in that case of the life of the mother. I just struggled with it myself for a long time but I came to realize: Life is that gift from God that I think even if life begins in that horrible situation of rape, that it is something that God intended to happen.

Dan Parker, chairman of the Indiana Democratic Party said, "As a pro-life Catholic, I'm stunned and ashamed that Richard Mourdock believes God intended rape". He also said, "Victims of rape are victims of an extremely violent act, and mine is not a violent God. Do we need any more proof that Richard Mourdock is an extremist who's out of touch with Hoosiers?" The day after the debate, Mourdock issued a statement saying, "God creates life, and that was my point. God does not want rape, and by no means was I suggesting that he does. Rape is a horrible thing, and for anyone to twist my words otherwise is absurd and sick." He later said at a press conference, "I believe God controls the universe. I don't believe biology works in an uncontrolled fashion." The controversy likely contributed to Mourdock's loss to Representative Joe Donnelly, and Tom LoBianco of Associated Press' The Big Story commented upon the similarities to Akin's comments.

=== Response ===
On October 22, a television commercial showing Governor Mitt Romney (the Republican nominee for United States President) supporting Mourdock began to air in Indiana. The Romney campaign subsequently issued a statement saying, "Gov. Romney disagrees with Richard Mourdock's comments, and they do not reflect his views," but it did not stop the commercial. Senator John Cornyn, chairman of the NRSC, said, "Richard and I, along with millions of Americans—including even Joe Donnelly—believe that life is a gift from God. To try and construe his words as anything other than a restatement of that belief is irresponsible and ridiculous."

Many Republicans publicly called for Mourdock to apologize for the statement. Senator McCain called for him to issue an apology, and said his support for Mourdock's campaign "depends on what he does." Senator Scott Brown refused to state that he supported Mourdock in the election. Republican Representative Mike Pence urged Mourdock to apologize, and said in a statement, "I strongly disagree with the statement made by Richard Mourdock during last night's Senate debate". Responding to a question on Mourdock's comment, President Obama said on the Tonight Show, "Rape is rape. It is a crime," and, "These various distinctions about rape don't make too much sense to me."

== Other controversial statements ==
Controversial comments about rape and abortion also came from other Republican legislators and legislative candidates. Following Todd Akin's comments, reporters at the Pennsylvania Press Club asked Pennsylvania Republican Senate candidate Tom Smith on August 27, 2012, how, considering his no-exceptions anti-abortion stance, he would tell a daughter or granddaughter who had been raped that she must keep the pregnancy. Smith said that he had been in a similar situation because his daughter had become pregnant out of wedlock. He said that he was not equating the two situations but that a father's position was similar. Salon said, "If you believe pregnancy from rape and pregnancy from sex out of marriage are 'similar', then you implicitly believe that the problem with rape is that it's non-sanctioned sexual activity, as opposed to a crime against a woman's person."

Wisconsin State Assembly member Roger Rivard became the subject of controversy in October 2012 because of his 2011 comment about a case against a high school senior for raping a 14-year-old girl. He said that when he was a teenager his father had warned him that, "Some girls rape easy". Rivard later told the Milwaukee Journal Sentinel that his words had been taken out of context and that "it was advice to me, telling me, 'If you're going to [have premarital sex], you may have consensual sex that night and then the next morning it may be rape.' So the way he said it was, 'Just remember, Roger, some girls, they rape so easy. It may be rape the next morning.'" Rivard lost the election to Democrat Stephen Smith.

On October 18, 2012, Republican Representative Joe Walsh said that due to scientific advances, an abortion is no longer necessary to save the life of the mother and that he therefore opposed policies that would allow a woman to have an abortion if pregnancy endangered her life. The following day, Walsh said that situations where "both mother and baby will die if the baby is not aborted" are "very rare", but he supported "medical procedures for women during their pregnancies that might result in the loss of the unborn child" in such cases.

John Koster, a Republican congressional candidate in Washington's 1st District, was asked after a campaign fundraiser on October 28, 2012, about exceptions from abortion prohibition for rape and incest victims. He said, "Incest is so rare, I mean, it's so rare ... But the rape thing—you know, I know a woman who was raped and kept the child, gave it up for adoption, and she doesn't regret it." He added, "On the rape thing, it's like, how does putting more violence onto a woman's body and taking the life of an innocent child that's a consequence of this crime—how does that make it better? You know what I mean?" His comments, including the use of the words "rape thing", drew local and national criticism. Koster acknowledged that his comments may have caused him to lose the election in Washington's most competitive district.

== Wider impact ==
The overall response to the controversies was negative, and some commentators blamed them for Republican losses during the election. Republican political consultant and policy advisor Karl Rove wrote in an opinion piece for The Wall Street Journal, "Offensive comments about rape by [Republican] Senate candidates in Missouri and Indiana gave the media an excuse to put social issues at the election's center in a way that badly hurt the entire party, as well as costing Republicans two Senate seats."

Karen Hughes, a former adviser to George W. Bush, wrote in Politico, "And if another Republican man says anything about rape other than it is a horrific, violent crime, I want to personally cut out his tongue. The college-age daughters of many of my friends voted for Obama because they were completely turned off by Neanderthal comments like the suggestion of 'legitimate rape.' " The conservative blog Hot Air linked Akin's remarks to polling indicating an increase in support for legalizing abortion in all circumstances.

The controversies caused the Republican Party to look for ways to prevent its election candidates from making similar comments about rape. Kevin Madden, a Republican strategist and senior adviser to the Mitt Romney presidential campaign, said, "This is actually pretty simple. If you're about to talk about rape as anything other than a brutal and horrible crime, stop". Anti-abortion groups, such as the Susan B. Anthony List, launched training programs to prevent controversial statements on rape and abortion. Republican pollster Kellyanne Conway told Republican members of the House of Representatives that rape is a "four-letter word" and Republicans need to avoid discussing it.
