= Chula Vista Christian University =

Private Christian university in California, US

- Motto: Innovation for the next generation
- Type: Private
- Established: 2020
- Founder: Lisa Dunne
- Religious affiliation: Non-denominational Christian
- President: Lisa Dunne
- Location: Chula Vista, California, U.S. 32.6364°N 116.9659°W
- Website: www.cvcu.us

Chula Vista Christian University (CVCU) is a private Christian university in Chula Vista, California, United States. The university was founded in 2020 and offers undergraduate programs from a Biblical worldview. CVCU claims to be "the first modern, homeschool-based university on the West Coast."

== History ==
The city of Chula Vista had tried to get a four-year university in the city since at least 1986, when local leaders offered to donate "at least 150 acres" to any institution, public or private, interested in opening a campus in the Otay Lakes area. In 1993, the city adopted the Otay Ranch General Development Plan, which included a four-year university as a part of its vision. In 2010, Governor Arnold Schwarzenegger vetoed AB24, a bill introduced by Assemblyman Marty Block to conduct a feasibility study of a California State University Chula Vista campus. Nonetheless, in 2012, the city acquired 375-acre (152 ha) intended for the development of a university and technology park, and chose a master developer, who later backed out of the project.

Chula Vista Christian University was first announced in April 2020 as the brainchild of author and speaker Lisa Dunne, who served as the school's inaugural president. It was reported that 20 to 30 students would begin instruction that fall in "small classes that emphasize[d] the Socratic method of teaching." The board of directors included conservative political commentators Audrea Decker Taylor and Gina Loudon – the latter also serving as co-chair of Women for Trump.

== Academics ==
The university offers Bachelor of Arts and Bachelor of Science degrees. CVCU is composed of several academic schools:

- Archimedes Institute of Engineering
- Booker T. Washington Institute for Social Science
- Dickens Institute for Communication Studies
- Edison Institute of Technology and Innovation
- Carson Institute for Local Leadership and Environmental Stewardship (planned)
- McGuffey Institute of Education
- Redi Institute for Holistic Health and Human Welfare

As of 2024, CVCU is in its fourth year of pre-candidacy of accreditation.

== Notable people ==
=== Faculty ===
- Jim Garlow, Evangelical pastor and author
- Rick Green, author, radio host, former member of the Texas House of Representatives
