= Greg Razer =

American politician

Member of the Missouri Senate from the 7th district
- In office January 6, 2021 – April 25, 2024
- Preceded by: Jason Holsman
- Succeeded by: Patty Lewis

Member of the Missouri House of Representatives from the 25th district
- In office January 2017 – January 5, 2021
- Preceded by: Jeremy LaFaver
- Succeeded by: Patty Lewis

Personal details
- Born: May 11, 1978 (age 48)
- Party: Democratic

Greg Razer is an American politician who served in the Missouri House of Representatives for the 25th district from 2017 to 2021 and in the Missouri Senate from 2021 to 2024. In 2020, he was elected to serve the 7th District in the Missouri Senate.

Prior to his election to the legislature, Razer was a field organizer for PROMO, the state's major LGBT advocacy organization, and worked on the campaign staff of Senator Claire McCaskill.

Razer resigned from the Missouri Senate in April 2024 after his confirmation to serve on the State Tax Commission.
