= America First Policies =

American political organization

- Founded: January 27, 2017; 9 years ago
- Founded at: Arlington, Virginia, US
- Tax ID no.: 81-5137380
- Legal status: 501(c)(4)
- Budget: $20 million
- Revenue: $30.8 million (2019)
- Expenses: $14.2 million (2019)
- Employees: 35 (2021)

America First Policies (A1P) was an organization created following the inauguration of Donald Trump in 2017 to promote the "America First" policy agenda of his administration. It was founded by Trump campaign staffers such as Nick Ayers, Rick Gates, and Brad Parscale. In 2021, America First Policies was reconstituted as America First Works, an advocacy group focused on building a political strategy around Trump's 2024 campaign.

== History ==
America First Policies was founded by several people, including Nick Ayers, a Republican consultant who is regarded as Mike Pence's top political adviser; Rick Gates; and Brad Parscale.

In 2017, Brian O. Walsh was hired to oversee the group's day-to-day operations after the group experienced high staff turnover.

Trump presidential campaign donor Rebekah Mercer disagreed with Parscale about the direction of America First Policies. According to investigative journalist Vicky Ward, Mercer wanted America First Policies' data engine to be Cambridge Analytica, which would have effectively given her organizational control and potentially influence over the Republican Party. According to Ward, if Mercer had control over the organization's database and the money, Mercer could have theoretically led the organization to sway the president's supporters against the president. Parscale aggressively sought to establish himself as leader of the group and commented in an early meeting that although he meant "no disrespect" to the Mercer family, the focus of America First Policies ought to be on Donald Trump and his political movement, rather than on the Mercers.

In June 2017, Republican Senator Dean Heller was targeted by the America First Policies with an advertising campaign over his opposition to the Obamacare repeal bill. Heller was considered to be vulnerable in the 2018 election, which he ultimately lost to Democratic challenger Jacky Rosen.

In May 2018, a CNN review of his Twitter account found that John Loudon, a former Missouri State Senator who briefly served as a policy advisor for America First Policies, had used inflammatory and derogatory language against women, Muslims, and Democrats.

In June 2018, Juan Pablo Andrade, a policy advisor for America First Policies and America First Action PAC, was fired from both groups after a video surfaced of him praising Nazis. After its founding, America First Policies sought but failed to receive seed funding from American heiress and Republican donor Rebekah Mercer.

In May 2018, MapLight reported that CVS Health, Dow Chemical, and the Southern Company had donated a combined $1.6 million (~$2.02 million in 2025) to America First Policies. After MapLight's report was published, CVS Health and Dow Chemical announced that they would not contribute more money to America First Policies, citing racist comments by the organization's staff. In March 2018, Carl Higbie had become the director of advocacy for America First Policies. He resigned from his position in June 2018 after CVS Health and Dow Chemical announced they would no longer contribute to the group in part due to Higbie's past comments.

== America First Action Super PAC ==
America First Action
- Founded: April 12, 2017; 9 years ago
- Type: Super PAC
- Tax ID no.: 82-1167449
- Legal status: 527 organization
- Chair: TBA
- President: Brian O. Walsh
- Website: www.a1apac.org

In the 2016 and 2018 elections, four Trump-related Super PACs received donations from 38 people who gave over $500,000 each. To consolidate these efforts, America First Action was created for 2020. It is the only Trump-related group permitted to collect unlimited donations in 2020. However, as of August 2020, only six of the previous 38 top donors contributed to America First.

The legally separate America First Action (as opposed to "Policies") Super PAC serves a similar function of promoting Trump's policies under the "America First" theme, but due to its legal status may expressly advocate for the election or defeat of particular candidates (rather than only advocating for policies), and must disclose its donors. Some staff members work for both organizations, such as the chair, president, and communications director, and the two organizations share space and equipment.

In the 2018 midterm election cycle, the Super PAC spent $29 million. As of the end of March 2020, it had reported spending $9 million during the 2020 election cycle.

In 2019, $910,000 (~$1.13 million in 2025) of America First Action's spending went to a company owned by Parscale and his wife.

== See also ==
- Rockbridge Network
