= Patty Lewis =

American politician and nurse

Member of the Missouri Senate from the 7th district
- Incumbent
- Assumed office January 8, 2025
- Preceded by: Greg Razer

Member of the Missouri House of Representatives from the 25th district
- In office January 6, 2021 – January 8, 2025
- Preceded by: Greg Razer
- Succeeded by: Pattie Mansur

Personal details
- Party: Democratic
- Profession: Nurse

Patty Lewis is a Missouri politician. She is a member of the Missouri Senate from the 7th district, serving since 2025. She previously represented the 25th district in the Missouri House of Representatives from 2021 to 2025. She is a member of the Democratic Party.

She was a nurse before being elected.

== Missouri House of Representatives ==
=== Committee assignments ===
- Conservation and Natural Resources
- Health and Mental Health Policy
- Professional Registration and Licensing
- Rural Community Development

== Missouri Senate ==
Lewis supports Amendment 3, which guarantees Missouri's access to abortions.

In 2025, Lewis introduced a bill that would improve health care for women in Missouri. The bill has bipartisan support in the Missouri Senate and in the House.

In March 2025, Lewis voted in favor of state takeover of the St. Louis Metropolitan Police Department. Democrats had added measures to the bill through negotiations and filibuster that improve treatment and support to incarcerated and exonerated individuals.

== Electoral history ==
Missouri House of Representatives Primary Election, August 2, 2020, District 25
Party	Candidate	Votes	%	±%
Democratic	Patty Lewis	7,100	72.21%	
Democratic	Drew Rogers	2,575	26.19%	
Democratic	Josh Swafford	157	1.60%	
Total votes		9,832	100.00%	

Missouri House of Representatives Election, November 3, 2020, District 25
Party	Candidate	Votes	%	±%
Democratic	Patty Lewis	21,273	100.00%	
Total votes		21,273	100.00%	

Missouri House of Representatives Primary Election, August 2, 2022, District 25
Party	Candidate	Votes	%	±%
Democratic	Patty Lewis	7,529	100%	
Total votes		7,529	100.00%	

Missouri House of Representatives Election, November 8, 2022, District 25
Party	Candidate	Votes	%	±%
Democratic	Patty Lewis	15,286	100.00%	0.00
Total votes		15,286	100.00%	

Missouri Senate Primary Election, August 6, 2024, District 7
Party	Candidate	Votes	%	±%
Democratic	Patty Lewis	14,970	67.0%	
Democratic	Pat Contreras	7,361	33.0%	
Total votes		22,331	100.00%	

Missouri Senate Election, November 5, 2024, District 7
Party	Candidate	Votes	%	±%
Democratic	Patty Lewis	58,149	74.5%	
Republican	Joey LaSalle	19,939	25.5%	
Total votes		78,088	100.00%	
