= Wife Swap (American TV series) =

American reality television series (2004–2020)

- Genre: Reality
- Narrated by: John Schwab; Mason Pettit
- Country of origin: United States
- Original language: English
- No. of episodes: 148 (original series); 40 (Celebrity Wife Swap); 20 (reboot); 4 (The Real Housewives Edition)

Production
- Running time: 42 minutes
- Production company: Banijay Studios North America (formerly RDF/Zodiak USA)

Original release
- Network: ABC
- Release: September 26, 2004 – August 13, 2010
- Release: March 21 – May 2, 2013
- Network: Paramount Network
- Release: April 4, 2019 – April 16, 2020

Wife Swap is an American reality television series based on the British series of the same name that premiered on September 26, 2004. In the program, two families, usually from different social classes and lifestyles, swap wives/mothers – or sometimes husbands – for two weeks. The show originally aired on ABC for six seasons between 2004 and 2010 and was narrated by actor John Schwab.

The program usually swaps wives who are polar opposites in some way, such as a messy wife swapping with a fastidiously neat one, or a stay-at-home mother swapping with a high-powered career woman, and documents the cultural and social differences that the wives and their new families must overcome.

A short-lived continuation of the original show aired on ABC in 2013. On March 8, 2018, it was announced that CMT had picked up the series for a 10-episode reboot. However, it was later announced that the reboot would premiere on April 4, 2019 on Paramount Network. On September 5, 2019, the series was renewed for a 20-episode season that premiered on February 13, 2020. On September 22, 2020, Paramount Network canceled the series as part of the network's then-planned shift to films.

A spin-off series featuring celebrities, Celebrity Wife Swap, ran on ABC from 2012 to 2015. A further spin-off, Wife Swap: The Real Housewives Edition, featuring cast members of Bravo's Real Housewives franchise, premiered on October 21, 2025.

== Synopsis ==
Two very different families are introduced, and the wife of each family (or, rarely, the husband) is sent to live with the other family for two weeks. Before meeting their new families, each wife has a chance to explore the family's home and read a manual left for them by the other wife. During the first week of their stay, the wives must live by their new families' rules and learn to adapt to a different lifestyle.

In the second week, the wives can impose their own rules on the families, which they read out at the "rules change ceremony". The rule changes almost inevitably result in conflict as the families push back against their new wives' demands.

After two weeks, the couples are reunited and come face to face across a table to discuss their experiences. This often leads to insults and arguments (and has even led to physical violence) though the couples also often use the time to reconcile and talk about what they have learned. The show ends with the cameras returning a few weeks later to see how the swap impacted each family's life.

== Series overview ==
Season	Episodes	Originally released		
Season	Episodes	First released	Last released	Network
1	21 (Note: Includes two episodes with different formats ("Boss Swap" and "Vacation Swap") and one episode that only aired outside the United States (Bedford/Leonard).)	September 26, 2004	March 23, 2005	ABC
2	24 (Note: Includes one compilation episode ("Wife Swap Saved My Marriage").)	September 12, 2005	May 1, 2006	ABC
3	20	September 18, 2006	August 6, 2007	ABC
4	20	January 2, 2008	June 25, 2008	ABC
5	22	October 3, 2008	May 1, 2009	ABC
6	14	April 2, 2010	August 13, 2010	ABC
7	7	March 21, 2013	May 2, 2013	ABC
8	10	April 4, 2019	June 6, 2019	Paramount Network
9	10	February 13, 2020	April 16, 2020	Paramount Network

== Legal issues ==
=== Trading Spouses ===
In early 2004, ABC announced an American version of the British show Wife Swap, to be called Trading Moms, having outbid Fox Network for the rights for the format in the United States. In June of the same year, Fox publicized a program with an almost identical format to Wife Swap titled Trading Spouses, which it began broadcasting on July 1. ABC then reverted to the original UK title for their series, which began on September 26. In December 2004, RDF Media sued Fox for copyright infringement for reproducing the Wife Swap format without their permission. In 2008, Fox sold the rights to the show to CMT, ending the run.

=== Gay swap ===
In November 2005, series participant Jeffrey Bedford sued ABC for over $10 million for trading his wife for a gay man. He accused ABC of being dishonest, not allowing him contact with his wife and making him miss his lessons at college. He claimed that, when he ceased participating with the production of the episode, ABC threatened that it would not tell him his wife's whereabouts and would not pay for his wife's return home. An ABC spokesman revealed that the contract stated the spouse could be of either gender. The episode (Bedford/Leonard) never aired in the United States, though it did air in the United Kingdom on Channel 4. In 2007, the British version of Wife Swap began a search for more gay or lesbian swaps.

=== Alicia Guastaferro ===
In March 2010, Alicia Guastaferro sued ABC for $100 million, claiming that her appearance and depiction on a 2008 episode of Wife Swap led to her public embarrassment and that she suffered from panic attacks and suicidal tendencies as a result. Guastaferro alleged that many of the scenes that depicted her as a "spoiled brat" were staged and that she had been purposely asked to "act a little more spoiled". The lawsuit was settled out of court later that same year and the terms were not disclosed to the press.

== Notable episodes ==
=== Controversies ===
The only aired episode of the original series to feature a same-sex couple was in 2004, with the lesbian Boone-Luffey family swapping with the conservative Christian Gillespie family. The Gillespies' wife, Kris, called the Boone-Luffeys' relationship "depraved" and implied that the lesbian wife sent to her house was a sexual predator. The episode created controversy, particularly within the LGBT community.

In a 2005 episode, the Wiggins family (who were Black) swapped wives with the Felix family (who were White). The Felix' husband Jeremy admitted to using racial slurs, leading to an angry confrontation with the Wiggins' wife Neicey. The couples also had a physical altercation at their table meeting. After the episode aired, the Felix family was harassed and had to be given private security by the show's producers.

An episode taped in 2005 featuring the Panagiotakis family was halted mid-production due to the father, Yanni, being arrested and charged with hitting his 13-year-old daughter in the face. The episode was never broadcast.

The 2006 episode between the Ridgely and Corrao families ended in violence, after the Ridgelys' wife Jen called the Corraos' wife Kim a "slut" and the husband Louis a "sap". Jen's husband Randy, a professional rodeo cowboy, flipped the table over and punched Louis. The couples declined to return to the table meeting. Randy stated afterwards that Louis had gotten "some cowboy education", and Louis remarked "I guess that's how they do it on the farm. They just, you know, it's hit first and ask questions later".

A 2007 episode featuring the Haigwood family of rural Iowa prompted numerous calls to the Iowa Department of Human Services. The family enforced a raw food diet on their children that included raw meat, and homeschooled them with a curriculum that allegedly included counting the number of eggs their chickens had hatched. However, it was determined by state officials that the unorthodox diet did not amount to child abuse, and that the parents had filed paperwork proving competent homeschooling.

In 2009, a San Francisco contestant named Stephen Fowler became the target of heavy online criticism for his disparaging attitude toward his substitute wife, Gayla Long. Fowler belittled Long throughout the show, calling her "uneducated, over-opinionated, and overweight" and a "dumb redneck", among other insults. The episode resulted in Fowler losing his job.

=== Spolansky/Bradley ===
The second episode of Wife Swap, which aired in 2004, featured Jodi Spolansky, a New York City multi-millionaire and Lynn Bradley, a hard-working woodcutter from rural New Jersey. The episode received attention after Bradley left the Spolansky household early, citing perceived disrespect from Jodi's husband, Steven Spolansky. Both families later appeared on The Oprah Winfrey Show, where Steven apologized and offered to do a day of Lynn's wood chopping duties.

=== Stockdale family murders ===
A 2009 episode featuring the Stockdale family later became notorious when one of the sons, Jacob Stockdale, murdered his mother and brother in 2017. The Stockdales, who performed in a family bluegrass band, were depicted on the show as sheltered and deeply religious.

=== One hundredth episode ===
For their hundredth episode on March 13, 2009, the show selected 24 families from previous episodes to participate in a contest to swap again. Viewers voting in October 2008 picked the artistic/psychic Silver family of Florida and the storm-chasing/UFO-hunting Heenes of Colorado. The Heenes later gained infamy in the national media when they were involved in the balloon boy hoax. According to Denver, Colorado blogger Bill Husted, "It sounds like a good match". But, "distressingly", L.A. Times writer Jon Caramancia wrote, "it's clear they haven't learned a thing".

=== Curtis Holland ===
Another March 2009 episode was notable for featuring six-year-old Curtis Holland. In this episode, Curtis and his calorie-loving family from North Carolina experience a week at the hands of fitness instructor Joy Brown who tries to force the family to change their unhealthy lifestyle. Throughout the episode, Holland frequently voices his distaste for Joy's fitness regimen. After the episode aired, Holland became very recognizable and had even been approached to film a reality show as well as advertise for a bacon company, both of which did not work out. A clip from the episode has received 18 million views as of April 2023. In 2015, Holland created a GoFundMe page to raise money for a car, stating that he never received any money from appearing on Wife Swap. The GoFundMe page was later removed.

=== Envy/Loudon ===
The only time a family withdrew from an episode during filming was in 2013, when Tea Party activist Gina Loudon quit the show after being swapped into the polyamorous Envy family. Gina checked into a hotel room and called her husband John, telling him "We’re definitely dealing with dark forces here". The Loudon family refused to attend the table meeting, though the episode still aired.

== Celebrity Wife Swap ==
On January 2, 2012, ABC began airing a celebrity version of Wife Swap.

=== Season 1 ===
The first season had 5 episodes where ten celebrities and their families took part:

1. Tracey Gold and Carnie Wilson
2. Gary Busey and Ted Haggard
3. Dee Snider and Flavor Flav
4. Niecy Nash and Tina Yothers
5. Antonio Sabàto Jr. and Mick Foley

=== Season 2 ===
On May 11, 2012, the show was renewed for a second season. The second season debuted on February 26, 2013. The celebrities who took part were:

1. Kate Gosselin and Kendra Wilkinson
2. Coolio and Mark McGrath
3. Alan Thicke and Gilbert Gottfried
4. Bristol and Willow Palin and Joan and Melissa Rivers
5. Ric Flair and Roddy Piper
6. Nia Peeples and Tiffany
7. Andy Dick and Lorenzo Lamas
8. Downtown Julie Brown and Lisa Leslie
9. Gerardo and Sisqó

=== Season 3 ===
It was announced on July 31, 2013, that the series has been renewed for a thirteen-episode third season. The third season began on April 15, 2014. The celebrities taking part are:

1. Daniel Baldwin and Jermaine Jackson
2. Tichina Arnold and Kelly Packard
3. Robin Leach and Eric Roberts
4. Laila Ali and Angie Stone
5. Angie Everhart and Pat Neely
6. Larry Birkhead and Hélio Castroneves
7. David Justice and Dweezil Zappa
8. Amanda Beard and Heidi Montag
9. Judy Gold and Penn Jillette
10. Joe Piscopo and Barry Williams
11. Jenna von Oÿ and Jill Zarin
12. Tyler Christopher and Ronn Moss
13. Plaxico Burress and DJ Paul

=== Season 4 ===
The fourth season premiered on May 20, 2015.

1. Jackée Harry and Traci Lords
2. Verne Troyer and Hines Ward
3. Jeremy London and David A. Siegel
4. Tami Roman and Kerri Walsh Jennings
5. Charo and Jill Whelan
6. Vince Neil and Gunnar Nelson
7. Holly Robinson Peete and Margaret Cho
8. Cloris Leachman and Pia Zadora
9. Sean Lowe and Jason Mesnick
10. George Hamilton and Alana Stewart and Angela Raiola
11. Corey Feldman and Tommy Davidson
12. CeCe Peniston and Kellie Williams
13. Robert Carradine and Terrell Owens

== Syndication ==
Episodes of Wife Swap air in syndication on Lifetime in the United States, E4 in the United Kingdom and CMT in Canada.
