= Jason Holsman =

American politician (born 1976)

Commissioner Jason Holsman
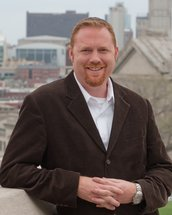

Member of the Missouri Senate from the 7th district
- In office January 10, 2013 – January 16, 2020
- Preceded by: Jane Cunningham
- Succeeded by: Greg Razer

Personal details
- Born: March 25, 1976 (age 50) Kansas City, Missouri, U.S.
- Party: Democratic
- Height: 6 ft 1 in (185 cm)
- Spouse(s): Robyn Holsman; 2 children
- Education: University of Kansas (B. A.); Norwich University (M. A.)
- Occupation: Licensed Missouri Realtor

Jason R. Holsman (born March 25, 1976) is a politician from the U.S. state of Missouri. He is a former member of the Missouri Public Service Commission and a former member of the Missouri Senate for the 7th district in Jackson County.

== Early life and education ==
Son of Gale and Judy Holsman, Jason was born and raised in Kansas City, Missouri. He graduated in 1994 from Blue Valley High School and attended the University of Missouri, where he became a member of the Pi Kappa Alpha fraternity. He later transferred to the University of Kansas, where he received his bachelor's degree in Political Science and U.S. History in 1999. He went on to earn his Master of Arts Degree in Diplomacy & Military Science from Norwich University in Vermont. In 2005, he earned his Missouri State Teaching Certificate from Northwest Missouri State University.

== Career ==
After his graduation from the University of Kansas, Holsman took a staff position in the United States Senate. Holsman's tenure working for then Senator John Ashcroft was brief and he soon returned to Missouri. Upon returning to the Midwest, Holsman accepted a position as a political correspondent to the Missouri Legislature for the Suburban Journals. While working for the Suburban Journals, he met his future wife, Robyn, and they returned to Kansas City, where she is a public school teacher.

Holsman spent three years as a network design engineer for Sprint PCS before becoming a certified public school teacher. As a social studies teacher of students from Independence and Kansas City, Missouri at Van Horn High School, he coached both varsity football and baseball.

== Missouri State Representative ==
In 2006, Holsman ran successfully for a seat in the Missouri House of Representatives (District 45). He was re-elected in 2008 and 2010.

Holsman was the Chairman of both the Joint Committee on Urban Agriculture and Special Committee on Renewable Energy. His additional committee assignments include the Joint Committee on Education, Utilities and International Trade and Business.

== Missouri State Senator ==
In 2012, Holsman ran successfully for a seat in the Missouri Senate (District 7).

In 2016, Holsman was re-elected to the Missouri Senate.

On January 16, 2020 Holsman resigned from the Missouri Senate and was confirmed to a six-year term as a member of the Missouri Public Service Commission.

== Personal life ==
Jason and Robyn Holsman wed in March 2001; the couple has two children and attend John Knox Kirk Presbyterian. He is a member of the Ancient and Accepted Free Masons.

== Elections ==
=== State Senator - District 7 (November 8, 2016) ===
- Jason Holsman (Dem) 60,759 79.227%
- Jeanne Bojarski (Lib) 15,931 20.773%

=== State Senator - District 7 (November 6, 2012) ===
- Jason Holsman (DEM) 64,674 100.00%

=== State Senator - District 7 (August 7, 2012) ===
- Jason Holsman (DEM) 7,513 53.1%
- Crystal Williams (DEM) 6,643 46.9%

=== Missouri House of Reps. - Dist. 45 (November 2, 2010) ===
- Jason R. Holsman (DEM) - 6,595 - 60.3%
- Nola Wood (Rep) - 4,348 - 39.7%

=== Missouri House of Reps. - Dist. 45 (November 4, 2008) ===
- Jason R. Holsman (DEM) - 11,470 - 68.1%'
- Jonathon Main (Rep) - 5,370 - 31.9%

=== Missouri House of Reps. - Dist. 45 (November 7, 2006) ===
- Jason R. Holsman (DEM) - 8,681 - 87.3%
- Tom Cole (WI) - 1,264 - 12.7%

=== Missouri House of Reps. - Dist. 45 - Democratic Primary (August 8, 2006) ===
- Jason R. Holsman - 1,581 - 52.6%
