= John William Loudon =

American politician

Member of the Missouri Senate from the 7th district
- In office 2000–2008
- Preceded by: Franc Flotron
- Succeeded by: Jane Cunningham

Personal details
- Born: August 14, 1967 (age 59) St. Louis, Missouri
- Party: Republican
- Spouse: Gina Loudon
- Children: 5

John William Loudon (born August 14, 1967) is a former Republican member of the Missouri Senate for the 7th District from 2000 until 2008 and a member of the Missouri House of Representatives from 1995 through 2000. He is the chairman of Florida Citizen Voters and Citizen Voters Inc, a member of Mar-a-Lago, and a former advisor to America First Policies.

== Early life ==
Loudon was born and raised in St. Louis, one of four children of Robert and Janice Loudon. He graduated from Westminster College in Fulton, Missouri, with a Bachelor of Arts degree in 1989, and received a Juris Doctor from the Oak Brook College of Law and Government Policy.

== Career ==
=== Political career ===
Loudon served in the Missouri House of Representatives from 1994 through 1998. He was elected to the Missouri State Senate in 2000, and again in 2004. While in the Senate, Loudon founded and chaired the Senate's Small Business, Insurance, and Industrial Relations Committee, was vice-chair of the Governmental Accountability and Fiscal Oversight Committee, and a member of the committees on education, gubernatorial appointments, and judiciary and civil and criminal Jurisprudence.

Towards the end of his career as senator, Loudon introduced an amendment to a health insurance bill that legalized the practice of midwifery in Missouri. (Missouri had previously been one of a minority of states that prohibited anyone other than registered nurses from serving as a midwife.) The Missouri State Medical Association, which represents physicians in the state, sued to block the controversial provision, arguing that it violated the state's single-subject rule for legislation. In 2008, the Missouri Supreme Court voted, 5–2, to uphold the legislation, finding that the Missouri State Medical Association lacked standing to sue.

Loudon is the chair of both Florida Citizen Voters and Citizen Voters Inc. Both organizations are working in Florida and nationally to change state constitutions to explicitly state that only citizens may vote in elections. As of July 2019, the Florida organization had raised $4.7 million and collected more than 1.5 million signatures, more than twice what was needed to place the measure on the 2020 ballot in Florida.

In May 2018, it was reported that Loudon had used inflammatory and derogatory language against women, Muslims and Democrats. He promoted conspiracy theories about President Obama's birth and religion, suggesting that Obama was a Kenyan-born Muslim.

=== Private sector ===
Missouri law limits state senators to eight years, so Loudon retired in 2008. He worked for a time for an association of nonunion contractors in California. Loudon is a former policy advisor for America First Policies, a pro-Trump organization and is a member of Mar-a-Lago. His wife, Gina Loudon, is a member of the Trump campaign's media advisory board and is a published author.

== Personal life ==
Loudon married Gina (Gentry) Loudon in 1990. They have five children. Loudon appeared on ABC's Wife Swap in 2013. The Loudons appeared on the ABC show Wife Swap in 2013, when they swapped with a polyamorous and bisexual family. Gina Loudon was the first wife to ever walk off of the set.
