= Tanya Melich =

Tanya Melich (born April 23, 1936) is an American political analyst, writer, and women's rights activist. She co-founded the National Women's Political Caucus and was an early leader of the National Women's Education Fund, which sought to teach women how to gain political power. Melich has held various positions affiliated with the Republican Party, including Executive Director of the New York State Republican Family Committee. She left the party in 1998 over women's issues and is credited with coining the popular phrase, "Republican war against women."

At the 1988 Republican National Convention in New Orleans, Louisiana, Melich advocated for the removal of the anti-abortion plank from the party platform and substitute a neutral position on abortion. Her proposal was shelved in the platform hearings by conservative forces led by Marilyn Thayer, a Republican activist who chaired the platform subcommittee on family issues and who in 1996 was elected president of the National Federation of Republican Women. Years later, Melich wrote about her experiences at the convention in her book, The Republican War Against Women: An Insider's Report from Behind the Lines. She now considers herself a Jeffords independent in the mold of the former U.S. Senator from Vermont.

== Early life ==
Melich was born in Moab, Utah on April 23, 1936. Her father, Mitchell Melich, served in the Utah State Senate, was president of the Utah Mining Association, on the Republican National Committee from Utah, the University of Utah Board of Regents and ran unsuccessfully for governor of Utah in 1964. He served as Solicitor of the U.S. Interior Department under the Nixon Administration. Melich's mother, Doris Marie Snyder Melich, founded the first Girl Scout troop in Moab in 1946, which began her thirty years of service to the state and national Girl Scouts. She served as a member, executive committee and president of the Utah chapter of the Arthritis Foundation, 1959–82, was appointed by President Gerald Ford to the National Arthritis Board, 1977–84 and was a member of the National Commission on Arthritis and Related Musculoskeletal Diseases, 1974-76.

Melich attended the University of Colorado and received a B.S. in political science in 1958, graduating cum laude with departmental and general honors. She was also elected to Phi Beta Kappa. She then attended Columbia University, receiving a master's degree in public law and government in 1961.

== Political career ==
In 1971, Melich helped organize the Manhattan Women's Political Caucus. She went on to co-found the New York State National Women's Political Caucus in 1972. In 1973, Melich became affiliated with the National Women's Education Fund, the first organization designed to educate women on ways to gain political power. She would later serve as the Fund's president from 1980 through 1983. Melich at various times also served as a political staffer for Nelson Rockefeller, Jacob Javits, Charles Goodell, and John Lindsay.

Concerned with the treatment of women in American society, Melich wanted women's issues to have more of an impact on the Republican Party's agenda. In 1976, Melich co-founded the National Women's Republican Task Force and was instrumental in organizing the group New York State Republicans for Women's Issues. In 1984, she co-founded the New York State Republican Family Committee. Both of the organizations advocated the Republican Party to take a pro-choice stance and recognize the needs and concerns of women to a greater extent. Melich attended every Republican National Convention from 1952 through 1996, except 1984.

== Books ==
- 1996 The Republican War Against Women: An Insider's Report From Behind the Lines

== Professional positions ==
- Political Issues Management, President, consultant in public policy analysis and strategy, political management, 1982-2002.
- New York State Republican Family Committee, Executive Director, a non-profit, educational organizational concerned with family issues, particularly related to women and children, 1984-1994
- CBS Inc., Corporate Affairs; Director, Civic Affairs, 1978–81; Associate Director, Public Policy Unit, 1976–78; Editor, Corporate Information, 1975-76.
- Nelson A. Rockefeller, consultant, Developed background books for national trips, advised on public issues and politics for vice-presidential confirmation hearings, 1974.
- Academy for Educational Development, Fall-Winter 1973. Writer, editor.
- Commission on Critical Choices, Policy Analyst, 1973
- Philip Van Slyck Inc.; Public Affairs writer, 1971–72
- U.S.Senator Charles Goodell Election Committee, New York State Chairman for Research, 1970.
- Allen-Van Slyck Group, Public Affairs writer, 1969
- Rockefeller for President, Co-director, National Delegate unit, 1968
- Thomas E. Dewey, Editorial Assistant for Dewey memoir, 1967–68
- Rockefeller for Governor of New York, Scheduler, 1966
- Lindsay for Mayor of New York City, GOP Research Director, 1965
- ABC News, Director of National Election Research, 1963–64
- Foreign Policy Association, Researcher-Writer, 1962
- The Salt Lake Tribune, News Reporter, 1957
- Citizenship Clearing House, Political Intern for Colorado Republican gubernatorial candidate, Don Brotzman, 1956

== Honors ==
- Advisory Committee of the New York City Department of Cultural Affairs, 1994-98.
- New York Children and Family Trust Fund Advisory Board, Fall, 1992
- Public Leadership Education Network, Visitor, Spring, 1991
- Alfred E. Moran Public Advocacy Award, 1990
- Woodrow Wilson Fellows Program, 1988-2012
- Outstanding Woman Award, NWPC-Manhattan, 1986
- European-American Summer School, USIA, Austria, 1985
- New York State Commission on Judicial Nomination, 1983–91
- Aspen Institute, Guest Contributor, West Berlin, May 1983; AT&T Seminar, May 1982, Communications Seminar, October 1980.
- Harvard University, Kennedy School of Government, Institute of Politics, Fellow, January–June, 1980.
- N.O.W.--New York, Susan B. Anthony Women of Achievement Award, 1980.
- Republican National Committee Advisory Council on Natural Resources, 1977-80.
- U.S. Civil Rights Commission, New York State Advisory Committee, 1973–81
- Republican National Convention: Delegate, NY, 1992; Alternate Delegate, 1980, 1976, 1972.

== See also ==
- War on women

== General Reference ==
- Tanya M. Melich Papers, M.E. Grenander Department of Special Collections and Archives, University Libraries, University at Albany, State University of New York (hereafter referred to as the Melich Papers).
