= Franc Flotron =

American politician

Francis E. Flotron Jr. (born December 23, 1954, in St. Louis) is an American former Republican politician who served in the Missouri Senate and the Missouri House of Representatives where he served as the Senate Republican leader and the [rose to the level of] House Assistant [Minority] Republican Floor Leader. In 1988, he was the first Missouri legislator to receive the National Federation of Independence Business "Small Business Guardian" award.

Flotron graduated from DeSmet Jesuit High School and Washington University with a bachelor's degree in business administration. After he left the state legislature, he became known as the only Republican male lobbyist with a ponytail in Jefferson City.
