= Jane Cunningham =

American politician (born 1946)

Member of the Missouri Senate from the 7th district
- In office 2008–2012
- Preceded by: John William Loudon
- Succeeded by: Jason Holsman

Personal details
- Born: September 4, 1946 (age 80) Columbia, South Carolina
- Party: Republican
- Spouse: Gary
- Education: Florida State University
- Profession: Marketing

Jane Cunningham (September 4, 1946) is an American politician from the state of Missouri. A Republican, Cunningham served as a member of the Missouri Senate, representing the 7th District from 2008 to early 2013. Due to Senate redistricting following the 2010 U.S. Census, Cunningham chose not to run for reelection in 2012. Prior to serving in the Missouri Senate, Cunningham was a four-term member of the Missouri House of Representatives from 2000 through 2008. In January 2013 Cunningham made an unsuccessful bid to be Chairperson of the Missouri Republican Party. She failed to receive enough votes on the first ballot to advance to the second, which saw the election of Ed Martin to the position.

== Legislation ==
- In 2011 senator Cunningham sponsored bill SB 222 which sought to change Missouri's child labor laws to allow businesses to employ children under the age of fourteen and eliminate restrictions on the number of hours those children may work during the day [1].
- Early in 2011, she was the sponsor of the Amy Hestir Student Protection Act, which regulated how educators interact with students online, especially in social media networks (St. Louis Review Article)
