= Weather of 1946 =

The following is a list of weather events that occurred on Earth in the year 1946. There were several natural disasters around the world from various types of weather, including blizzards, cold waves, droughts, heat waves, wildfires, floods, tornadoes, and tropical cyclones.

== Deadliest events ==
Deadliest meteorological events during 1946
Rank	Event	Date(s)	Deaths (+Missing)	Refs
1	November Andhra coast cyclone	November ??	750	
2	Typhoon Querida	September 18–27	154	
3	Tornado outbreak of January 4–6	January 4–6	47	
4	Windsor–Tecumseh tornado	June 17	17	
5	Mankato–North Mankato, Minnesota tornado	August 17	11	
6	1946 Florida hurricane	October 5–14	5	
7	Tornado outbreak of May 23–24	May 23–24	4	
8				
9				
10				

== Types ==
The following listed different types of special weather conditions worldwide.

== Timeline ==
This is a timeline of weather events during 1946.

=== January ===
- January 4–6 — A small but violent tornado outbreak across the South—Central United States kills 47 people and injures at least 412 others. L. H. Seamon with the U.S. Weather Bureau, the predecessor of the National Weather Service, later stated this was the "most disastrous" tornado event of the year.

=== February ===
- February 5–6 — A blizzard in South Dakota leaves two people dead in the city of Huron.
- February 13 — A tornado estimated at F3 intensity struck Ardmore, Oklahoma, killing one person and leaving over 1,700 buildings damaged or destroyed in the city.
- February 24 — A 240 feet (73 m) section of the Cooper River Bridge is “carried away” by high winds, killing five people during the destruction.

=== March ===
- March 16 — A long-tracked thundersquall, a combination of a thunderstorm and a squall, kills ten people, destroys 78 homes, and damaged 94 others. It was noted by the United States Weather Bureau that the houses were “rural negro dwellings”. The thundersquall traveled at least 60 miles (97 km).
- March 22 — A violent tornado estimated at F4 intensity struck near Wynona, Oklahoma, where it destroyed 15 homes and a power plant and damaged ten other homes. A 500 pounds (230 kg) piece of machinery was carried 0.5 miles (0.80 km) by the tornado.

=== April ===
- April 21 — A tornado strikes around Timber Lake, South Dakota, causing $150,000 in property damage. (1946 USD) in property damage throughout the city. This tornado did not receive an estimated rating on the Fujita scale from Thomas P. Grazulis, meaning it was believed to have been F0 or F1 intensity. The U.S. Weather Bureau published a paper in 1946 which stated the width of this tornado was 4 miles (6.4 km), which would make this the widest tornado ever documented in history, beating the 2013 El Reno tornado.

=== May ===
- May 10 – An intense tornado, estimated at F3 intensity, struck around Eufaula, Oklahoma, killing one person, injuring five others, and it damaged or destroyed 18 structures.
- May 15 – A violent tornado, estimated at F4 intensity, struck south of Loraine before striking the community of Champion, where it killed a person, injured two others, and leveled several homes, including one that was newly built.
- May 17 – An intense tornado, estimated at F3 intensity, struck Norris City, Illinois, where it killed one person and leveled three homes.
- May 18 – A violent tornado, estimated at F4 intensity, strikes Stoneburg, Texas. Along the tornado's 30 miles (48 km) path, it kills three people and obliterates a church, where a linen scarf was untouched that laid on the pulpit. An hour later a second violent tornado, also estimated at F4 intensity, struck around Sanger, Texas, killing a nine-year-old girl.
- May 20 – A long-track tornado, estimated at F3 intensity, occurs in North Carolina, where it kills two people near Grifton.
- May 23–24 – A significant tornado outbreak of at least 17 tornadoes occurs in the Central United States. Four people are killed and 42 others are injured during the outbreak.

=== June ===
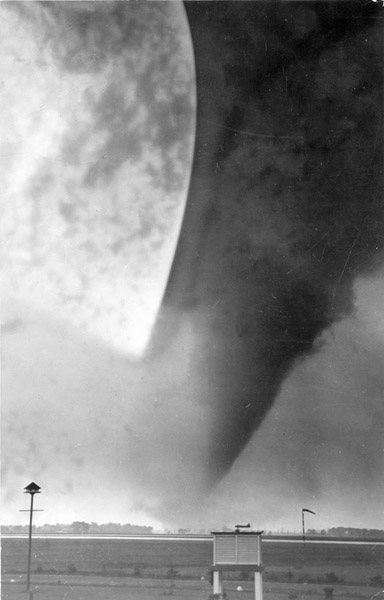
The Windsor Tornado, taken at Windsor Airport looking northwest towards downtown and Detroit.

- June 7 – An intense tornado, estimated at F3 intensity, struck Froid, Montana, where it "nearly leveled" a five-room farmhouse, destroyed a second farmhouse, killed one person and injured another.
- June 13 — A tornadic event in Europe spawns three tornadoes two F2 tornadoes in the Czech Republic, an F1 tornado that strikes Zabrzeg, Poland killing one person, and a fourth unrated tornado in Austria.
- June 17 — A violent F4 tornado impacts the city of Windsor, Ontario, killing at least 17 people and causing $9.6 million (1946 CAD) in damage. This tornado was one of two officially rated F4 tornadoes during the year.

=== July ===
- July 12 – A lightning strike in Saratoga, North Carolina kills four people and injures four others.
- July 23 – A brief tornado struck around Concord, New Hampshire, killing one person. A 150-foot section of a steel and brick building was leveled, several pieces of machinery were destroyed and army vehicles from a National Guard Arsenal were damaged.

=== August ===
- August 17 — A violent tornado estimated at F4 intensity, struck the Green Gables camp southwest of Mankato, Minnesota, killing 11 people and injuring 100 others. Multiple cars were thrown at least 500 feet (170 yd; 150 m) and a 54,000 pounds (24,000 kg) road grader was thrown 100 feet (33 yd; 30 m). Later in the day, a second violent tornado, also estimated at F4 intensity, struck Wells, injuring 30 people.
- August 20 — A large and violent tornado strikes Kłodzko, Poland, with an estimated intensity of F2–F4 on the Fujita scale. A few hours later, a large, deadly tornado, rated F3 by the European Severe Storms Laboratory, struck Stronie Śląskie and Stójków in Poland, killing one person and leaving ten missing. In an academically peer reviewed paper published in 2017, the tornado (combined) was rated F3/F4. This was one of two officially rated F4 tornadoes during the year.

=== September ===
- September 5 — Multiple thundersqualls, a combination of a thunderstorm and a squall, kill one person in Minnesota.
- September 18–27 — Typhoon Querida kills 154 people and destroys over 373,000 houses in Taiwan.

=== October ===
- October 5–14 — The 1946 Florida hurricane kills five people in Cuba and causes $5.2 million (1946 USD) in damage in the state of Florida.

=== November ===
- November 2 — An intense tornado, estimated at F3 intensity, struck Washington, Arkansas, where it killed one person.
- November 2–5 — A winter storm kills 13 people and causes $10 million (1946 USD) in damage in the state of Colorado.
- November 10 — A significant tornado struck Pointe Coupee Parish, Louisiana, where it killed two people and injured eight others.
- November ?? — The November 1946 Andhra coast cyclone kills 750 people.

=== December ===
- December 2

- A gale in the Massachusetts Bay sinks the barge Winsor, leading to the drowning of two people.
- A person dies of heart attack induced by hypothermia in Philadelphia, Pennsylvania.

- December 30 — An ice storm in Mississippi kills one person.
