= List of United States tornadoes in 1946 =

This page documents all the known tornadoes that touched down in the United States during 1946. Tornadoes which occurred in the United States prior to 1950 are not officially rated. Tornado expert Thomas P. Grazulis rated significant tornadoes, those rated F2 or higher on the Fujita scale, and the ratings are accepted and acknowledged by the National Weather Service. However, since the National Weather Service did not rate the tornadoes, the ratings are considered unofficial.

== Confirmed tornadoes ==
Confirmed tornadoes by Fujita rating
FU	F0	F1	F2	F3	F4	F5	Total
≥32	≥1	≥1	49	17	14	0	114

== January ==
Confirmed tornadoes by Fujita rating
FU	F0	F1	F2	F3	F4	F5	Total
≥1	≥0	≥0	4	3	3	0	≥11

=== January 4 event ===
List of confirmed tornadoes – Friday, January 4, 1946 (Note: All dates and times are based on the local time zone where the tornado touched down.)
F#	Location	County / Parish	State	Time (local)	Path length	Max width
F2	S of Decatur	Wise	TX	14:00	5 mi (8.0 km)	70 to 300 yd (64 to 274 m)
F2	The last three cars of a freight train were derailed, injuring five workers in the caboose. Two people were injured in a nearby farmhouse that was "torn apart" by the tornado. According to the US Weather Bureau it was 300 yards (270 m) wide, caused eight injuries and destroyed two farmhouses, while Thomas P. Grazulis documents a width of 70 yards (64 m) with seven injuries and one farmhouse destroyed.					
F3	Clawson	Angelina	TX	20:30	10 mi (16 km)	800 to 880 yd (730 to 800 m)
F3	3 deaths – The tornado moved northeastward through the community of Clawson, where it destroyed 30 homes, killing three people in two separate homes. Along the tornado's path, it destroyed 48 buildings and damaged another 327. The tornado injured 50 people and caused $500,000 in damage ($7.5 million in 2022).					
F4	Nacogdoches to Appleby	Nacogdoches	TX	20:45–21:30?	20 mi (32 km)	800 to 880 yd (730 to 800 m)
F4	10 deaths – The tornado occurred 7 miles (11 km) from the previous one, both produced by the same supercell. It caused extensive damage in the city of Nacogdoches, where 80 homes were completely destroyed and 150 more were damaged. Throughout the city, 75 people were injured, and, on the west side of Nacogdoches, six were killed. The tornado also struck the city of Appleby, where 300 buildings were damaged or destroyed, thousands of acres of forestry were flattened, and three killed. Overall, the tornado caused ten fatalities, injured 200, and resulted in $1,500,000 in damages (equivalent to $22.5 million in 2022). Texas A&M University states that this tornado was the same tornado as above, which increased the tornado’s death toll to 13 and damage total to $2.1 million ($31.5 million in 2022).					
F2	Peniel	Hunt	TX	21:00	2 mi (3.2 km)	200 yd (180 m)
F2	In Peniel, known today as Greenville, 11 homes were destroyed and 8 more were damaged; 102 other buildings were damaged or destroyed. In total, 17 people were injured.					
F4	Log Lake to Southview to Palestine	Anderson	TX	21:00	18 mi (29 km)	400 to 440 yd (370 to 400 m)
F4	15 deaths – The tornado touched down 10 miles (16 km) southwest of Palestine moving northeastward. Two people were killed near Log Lake. In the Southview community, the tornado destroyed 36 homes and damaged another 122 structures. Thirteen deaths occurred in seven of the destroyed homes in Southview. Cars were thrown several hundred yards throughout Southview. In total, the tornado killed 15 people and injured at least 60 others. The National Weather Service in Amarillo, Texas, lists this tornado as one of the worst tornadoes in the history of the state. One surviving resident recalls the sound as a "freight train like roar". The damage total for this tornado was $500,000 ($7.5 million in 2022).					
F2	St. Paul to Shiloh	Limestone	TX	21:30	5 mi (8.0 km)	>0 yd (0 m)
F2	8 deaths – Nine homes were destroyed, leading to two deaths in two separate homes. Other property damage also occurred. The tornado injured at least 17 people. The Madera Tribune reports this tornado killed "five or six negros...when the storm struck and demolished a gymnasium while a basketball game was in progress". Neither Grazulis nor the US Weather Bureau report deaths at the gymnasium.					

=== January 5 event ===
List of confirmed tornadoes – Saturday, January 5, 1946
F#	Location	County / Parish	State	Time (local)	Path length	Max width
FU	Waynesboro	Wayne	MS	Unknown	>0 mi (0 km)	>0 yd (0 m)
FU	A tornado struck around Waynesboro, causing mostly roof and tree damage. This tornado did not receive an estimated rating on the Fujita scale from Grazulis, meaning he believes it was F0 or F1 intensity.					

=== January 6 event ===
List of confirmed tornadoes – Sunday, January 6, 1946
F#	Location	County / Parish	State	Time (local)	Path length	Max width
F4	SE of Wilmot to Lake Chicot to SE of Lake Village	Ashley, Chicot	AR	18:00	4 to 5 mi (6.4 to 8.0 km) or 23 mi (37 km)	800 to 880 yd (730 to 800 m)
F4	3 deaths – The large tornado leveled multiple homes of all sizes along its path, including over 20 homes on two plantations near Wilmot, with 3 more homes swept away into Lake Chicot. The US Weather Bureau describes it as a "small tornado", with a path length of 4–5 miles, while stating that about 45 buildings were demolished and that 50 other buildings were damaged. Both the US Weather Bureau and Grazulis state the tornado killed three people and injured 50 others.					
F3	ENE of Seven Pines to near Coila to SE of Carrollton	Carroll	MS	18:00	13 mi (21 km)	>0 yd (0 m)
F3	4 deaths – A dozen small homes were destroyed, with four deaths occurring in three of the destroyed homes. The US Weather Bureau reports that when the tornado went through Seven Pines "it destroyed nearly every building.". Grazulis notes that there were conflicts about when this tornado occurred, meaning there were potentially two separate tornadoes. The US Weather Bureau records two people dead and five injured, while Grazulis states four dead and ten injured.					
F3	NW of Indianola to NW of Sunflower to E of Doddsville	Sunflower	MS	18:00	20 mi (32 km)	>0 yd (0 m)
F3	4 deaths – Two people were killed when a church was destroyed north of Indianola, another when a nearby home was obliterated, and the fourth in a small home northwest of Sunflower.					

=== January 8 event ===
List of confirmed tornadoes – Tuesday, January 8, 1946
F#	Location	County / Parish	State	Time (local)	Path length	Max width
F2	Port Arthur	Jefferson	TX	08:00 or 08:30	2 mi (3.2 km)	>0 yd (0 m)
F2	Two homes had their roofs ripped off. The U.S. Weather Bureau states that several homes and outbuildings were damaged by the tornado.					

== February ==
Confirmed tornadoes by Fujita rating
FU	F0	F1	F2	F3	F4	F5	Total
≥0	≥1	≥0	3	1	0	0	≥5

=== February 13 event ===
List of confirmed tornadoes – Wednesday, February 13, 1946
F#	Location	County / Parish	State	Time (local)	Path length	Max width
F3	Ardmore	Carter	OK	02:45 or 03:00	4 mi (6.4 km)	>0 yd (0 m)
F3	1 death – On the eastern side of Ardmore 30–50 homes were destroyed and another 1,700 buildings damaged. In total, the tornado killed one person, injured 15 others, and caused $1–1.5 million in damage (equivalent to $15 million-$22.5 million in 2022).					
F2	ENE of Cedartown to WNW of Rockmart	Polk	GA	20:45	3 mi (4.8 km)	50 yd (46 m)
F2	Eight barns were destroyed and five homes damaged in a rural community 8 miles (13 km) west-northwest of Rockmart.					

=== February 18 event ===
List of confirmed tornadoes – Monday, February 18, 1946
F# (Note: All ratings on the Fujita scale were done by Thomas P. Grazulis, a tornado expert, and are classified unofficial ratings since official ratings for tornadoes began in 1950.)	Location	County / Parish	State	Time (local)	Path length	Max width
F0	Oklahoma City	Oklahoma	OK	15:00	>0 mi (0 km)	>0 yd (0 m)
F0	A "small tornado" caused minor damage to homes on the outskirts of Oklahoma City. This tornado did not receive an estimated rating on the Fujita scale from Thomas P. Grazulis, meaning he believes it was F0 or F1 intensity. The National Weather Service office in Norman, Oklahoma rated it an F0 based on local records kept at the office.					

=== February 27 event ===
List of confirmed tornadoes – Wednesday, February 27, 1946
F#	Location	County / Parish	State	Time (local)	Path length	Max width
F2	Tampa	Hillsborough	FL	14:00	>0 mi (0 km)	>0 yd (0 m)
F2	One home was destroyed and another partially unroofed in the Terrace Park neighborhood, leaving three people injured. The U.S. Weather Bureau describes it as "freak tornado".					
F2	SE of Lakeland	Polk	FL	15:10	0.5 to 0.7 mi (0.80 to 1.13 km)	100 yd (91 m)
F2	The tornado demolished a home, damaged another, and destroyed several barns and sheds. Grazulis documents only one home being unroofed by the tornado. Tornado Archive documents the length of this tornado as 0.7 miles (1.1 km).					

== March ==
Confirmed tornadoes by Fujita rating
FU	F0	F1	F2	F3	F4	F5	Total
≥0	≥0	≥0	2	0	1	0	≥3

=== March 15 event ===
List of confirmed tornadoes – Friday, March 15, 1946
F#	Location	County / Parish	State	Time (local)	Path length	Max width
F2	Kewanee	Lauderdale (confirmed) Forrest, Wayne (possible)	MS	21:25–22:00	>0 mi (0 km)	400 to 900 yd (370 to 820 m)
F2	The U.S. Weather Bureau documents a series of tornadoes in the Forrest, Wayne, and Lauderdale counties of Mississippi, which damaged several structures and caused $275,000 in damage ($4.13 million in 2022). Grazulis documents a tornado destroying multiple barns, a church, and a small home near Kewanne, Lauderdale County, Mississippi, but does not mention any damage or tornadoes in Forrest or Wayne county. One person was injured.					

=== March 22 event ===
List of confirmed tornadoes – Friday, March 22, 1946
F#	Location	County / Parish	State	Time (local)	Path length	Max width
F4	SE of Wynona	Osage	OK	20:00	3 mi (4.8 km)	440 to 800 yd (400 to 730 m)
F4	This large tornado destroyed 15 homes and a power plant, and damaged ten other homes. A 500 pounds (230 kg) piece of machinery was carried 0.5 miles (0.80 km) by the tornado.					

=== March 27 event ===
List of confirmed tornadoes – Wednesday, March 27, 1946
F#	Location	County / Parish	State	Time (local)	Path length	Max width
F2	E of Houston	Suwannee	FL	13:00	>0 mi (0 km)	200 yd (180 m)
F2	Several barns were destroyed and a school was unroofed.					

== April ==
Confirmed tornadoes by Fujita rating
FU	F0	F1	F2	F3	F4	F5	Total
≥3	≥0	≥0	1	0	0	0	≥4

=== April 5 event ===
List of confirmed tornadoes – Friday, April 5, 1946
F#	Location	County / Parish	State	Time (local)	Path length	Max width
F2	Around Ottawa	Franklin	KS	16:30	6 mi (9.7 km)	100 yd (91 m)
F2	A large barn and several smaller farm buildings were demolished across two farms.					

=== April 15 event ===
List of confirmed tornadoes – Monday, April 15, 1946
F#	Location	County / Parish	State	Time (local)	Path length	Max width
FU	Euless	Tarrant	TX	17:00	1 mi (1.6 km)	33 yd (30 m)
FU	The north-northeasterly tornado twisted and snapped large trees and blew in the front of multiple buildings. This tornado did not receive an estimated rating on the Fujita scale from Thomas P. Grazulis, meaning he believes it was F0 or F1 intensity.					
FU	Euless	Tarrant	TX	17:00	0.5 mi (0.80 km)	33 yd (30 m)
FU	This easterly moving twin of the previous tornado blew the roof off the Euless Lumber Company and collapsed a house. This tornado did not receive an estimated rating on the Fujita scale from Thomas P. Grazulis, meaning he believes it was F0 or F1 intensity.					

=== April 21 event ===
List of confirmed tornadoes – Sunday, April 21, 1946
F#	Location	County / Parish	State	Time (local)	Path length	Max width
FU	Around Timber Lake	Dewey	SD	22:00	6 mi (9.7 km)	7,040 yd (6,440 m) (Note: The officially recognized widest tornado in history is the 2013 El Reno tornado, with a width of 2.6 miles (4.2 km; 4,600 yd; 4,200 m). This tornado was marked by the United States Weather Bureau to have been wider than the 2013 El Reno tornado. However, due to recognition of that tornado as the widest tornado, it should be taken that this width is most likely an error from the U.S. Weather Bureau.)
FU	The tornado struck the city of Timber Lake, causing at least $150,000 in property damage ($2.25 million+ in 2022). This tornado did not receive an estimated rating on the Fujita scale from Thomas P. Grazulis, meaning he believes it was F0 or F1 intensity. In 1946 the U.S. Weather Bureau published a paper stating the tornado’s width to be 4 miles (6.4 km), which would make this the widest tornado ever documented.					

== May ==
Confirmed tornadoes by Fujita rating
FU	F0	F1	F2	F3	F4	F5	Total
≥9	≥0	≥0	15	8	7	0	≥39

=== May 10 event ===
List of confirmed tornadoes – Friday, May 10, 1946
F#	Location	County / Parish	State	Time (local)	Path length	Max width
F3	Curved around Eufaula	McIntosh, Pittsburg	OK	19:45	10 mi (16 km)	850 to 1,700 yd (780 to 1,550 m)
F3	1 death – One person was killed and five injured; additionally, 11 buildings were destroyed and seven damaged. In total $35,000 in damage occurred ($375,000 in 2022), including $25,000 in property damage ($525,000 in 2022).					
F2	NW of Queen City, Texas	Cass	TX	??:??	>0 mi (0 km)	>0 yd (0 m)
F2	Two homes were destroyed.					

=== May 15 event ===
List of confirmed tornadoes – Wednesday, May 15, 1946
F#	Location	County / Parish	State	Time (local)	Path length	Max width
F4	S of Loraine to Champion to Maryneal	Mitchell, Nolan	TX	??:??	>0 mi (0 km)	400 yd (370 m)
F4	1 death – On the west side of Champion, several homes were damaged and three destroyed, including one that was noted to be newly constructed. Inside the recently built house one was killed and two were severely injured. South of Loraine, two homes were destroyed, and in total over 100 animals were killed. The United States Weather Bureau documented this event as a hailstorm, rather than a tornado.					
F2	SW of Briscoe	Wheeler	TX	??:??	>0 mi (0 km)	>0 yd (0 m)
F2	A home was unroofed.					

=== May 16 event ===
List of confirmed tornadoes – Thursday, May 16, 1946
F#	Location	County / Parish	State	Time (local)	Path length	Max width
F2	Sandy Ridge	Lowndes	AL	02:00	3 to 4 mi (4.8 to 6.4 km)	17 to 20 yd (16 to 18 m)
F2	A large family home was destroyed, along with smaller homes and other farm buildings; pecan trees and a truck were also destroyed.					
FU	Carnegie	Caddo	OK	20:00	>0 mi (0 km)	850 yd (780 m)
FU	This southwestward-moving tornado damaged several buildings.					

=== May 17 event ===
List of confirmed tornadoes – Friday, May 17, 1946
F#	Location	County / Parish	State	Time (local)	Path length	Max width
FU	Around Marion and Crayne	Crittenden	KY	14:30–17:30	>0 mi (0 km)	20 to 30 yd (18 to 27 m)
FU	This tornado injured two near Crayne and caused $350,000 in damage ($5.25 million in 2022).					
F3	NWN of West End to Norris City	Franklin, Saline, Hamilton, White	IL	16:30	27 mi (43 km)	150 yd (140 m)
F3	1 death – Six homes and twelve barns were damaged in rural areas. In Norris City, three homes were nearly leveled, killing one person.					

=== May 18 event ===
List of confirmed tornadoes – Saturday, May 18, 1946
F#	Location	County / Parish	State	Time (local)	Path length	Max width
FU	Beloit	Lyon	IA	18:30	2 to 3 mi (3.2 to 4.8 km)	>0 yd (0 m)
FU	Small buildings and windmills were damaged; several trees were uprooted.					
F4	SE of Stoneburg to NE of Bowie	Clay, Montague, Denton	TX	19:00	30 mi (48 km)	400 yd (370 m)
F4	3 deaths – In Stoneburg, a church was obliterated, with debris splintered and scattered for a mile. That said, a linen scarf was untouched that laid on the pulpit. Elsewhere along the tornado's track, an elderly man was killed and his wife injured after their house was destroyed. Also killed were a "prominent elderly couple" when their home was leveled, along with every barn on their new ranch. The U.S. Weather Bureau considers this tornado and the following tornado the same, while Grazulis splits the tornadoes up. In total, three people were killed, 15 others injured, and $112,000 in damage occurred ($1.68 million in 2022).					
F4	Around Sanger	Denton	TX	20:00	8 mi (13 km)	200 yd (180 m)
F4	1 death – East of Sanger three homes were leveled and a nine-year-old girl was killed by flying debris while she ran for the storm cellar. Another home was destroyed on the north side of Sanger. The U.S. Weather Bureau considers this tornado and the following tornado the same, while Grazulis splits the tornadoes up. In total, one person was killed and five were injured.					

=== May 19 event ===
List of confirmed tornadoes – Sunday, May 19, 1946
F#	Location	County / Parish	State	Time (local)	Path length	Max width
F2	Morgan City	St. Mary	LA	20:45	>0 mi (0 km)	100 yd (91 m)
F2	A grocery store was destroyed and four homes were unroofed in Morgan City.					

=== May 20 event ===
List of confirmed tornadoes – Monday, May 20, 1946
F#	Location	County / Parish	State	Time (local)	Path length	Max width
F3	SE of Seven Springs to N of Kinston to NW of Grifton	Wayne, Lenoir, Pitt	NC	20:15	25 mi (40 km)	150 yd (140 m)
F3	2 deaths – Three homes and twelve barns were destroyed, with 25 other homes damaged. An elderly couple was killed in their home northwest of Grifton. The U.S. Weather Bureau documents this as two separate tornadoes, with Wayne County being hit, while Grazulis documents this as one tornado that did not hit Wayne County. In total, two people were killed, 50 were injured, and the tornado caused $110,000 in damage ($1.65 million in 2022).					

=== May 22 event ===
List of confirmed tornadoes – Wednesday, May 22, 1946
F#	Location	County / Parish	State	Time (local)	Path length	Max width
FU	Hill City	Graham	KS	18:00	20 mi (32 km)	6 yd (5.5 m)
FU	The U.S. Weather Bureau documents this as a tornado and hail event that caused crop and property damage totaling $40,000 ($600,273 in 2022).					

=== May 23 event ===
List of confirmed tornadoes – Thursday, May 23, 1946
F#	Location	County / Parish	State	Time (local)	Path length	Max width
FU	Wheat fields	Rooks	KS	12:00–13:00	6 mi (9.7 km)	2,600 yd (2,400 m)
FU	A large tornado caused a six-mile-long damage path through wheat fields according to the U.S. Weather Bureau. This tornado did not receive a rating on the Fujita scale from Thomas P. Grazulis, indicating Grazulis estimates F0 to F1 intensity.					
F4	SW of Enosdale to W of Washington	Washington	KS	14:00	14 mi (23 km)	600 yd (550 m)
F4	1 death – A violent tornado struck west of the community of Enosdale, where eight farms were severely damaged. Two farmhouses were completely swept off their foundations, killing an elderly woman. In total, six people were injured and 70 head of livestock were killed. The U.S. Weather Bureau published the tornado's path length as 20 miles (32 km).					
F4	E of Washington to Emmons	Washington	KS	15:15	8 mi (13 km)	600 yd (550 m)
F4	This violent tornado traveled a path nearly parallel to the previous tornado. East of Washington a farmhouse was completely leveled, five others were damaged near the community of Emmons. The tornado injured two people and caused $100,000 in damage ($1.5 million in 2022). The U.S. Weather Bureau published the tornado's width as 440 yards (400 m).					
F3	NNE of Home, KS to W of Summerfield, KS to SSE of Liberty, NE	Marshall (KS), Gage (NE)	KS, NE	15:30	10 mi (16 km)	300 yd (270 m)
F3	Several buildings across six farms were destroyed, on one farm only the house was left standing. Two people were injured.					
F3	NE of Craig to W of Skidmore to NW of Pickering	Holt, Atchison, Nodaway	MO	17:00	35 mi (56 km)	300 yd (270 m)
F3	An intense tornado, which was described as having "feelers" extending around the main funnel, damaged or destroyed multiple structures. Three homes sustained "near-F4 damage". A roast was found in a car thrown into a tree, with parts of the refrigerator it had been in thrown 0.5 mi (0.80 km). The tornado injured four people and caused $335,000 in damage ($5.03 million in 2022). Thomas P. Grazulis notes this was likely a tornado family.					
F2	SE of Monrovia to SW of Atchison	Atchison	KS	18:00	10 mi (16 km)	400 yd (370 m)
F2	A home had its roof ripped off and six barns were destroyed.					
F3	S of Martin City to Holmes Park to Kansas City	Jackson	MO	18:25	11 mi (18 km)	600 yd (550 m)
F3	2 deaths – South of Martin City, the tornado destroyed a barn and silo. It then struck Holmes Park "with full force" before lifting in the southeastern portion of Swope Park. An elderly couple was killed when their home was completely destroyed and carried 100 yards (91 m). Five other people were injured.					
F3	NE of Richmond to SE of Stet to NW of Tina	Ray, Carroll	MO	19:30	40 mi (64 km)	200 yd (180 m)
F3	A long-tracked and intense tornado damaged or destroyed numerous homes and barns. "Near-F4 damage" occurred at a farm west of Bogard. The total damage for this tornado and a parallel F2 tornado, which occurred an hour later, was $500,000 ($7.5 million in 2022). Between the two tornadoes, fifty homes were damaged or destroyed.					
F2	NE of Parkville to Kansas City	Platte, Clay	MO	19:30	5 mi (8.0 km)	70 yd (64 m)
F2	The tornado destroyed a barn, and a few homes in Barry and Gashland (modern day Kansas City) were torn apart.					
F2	N of Wellington to NW of Norborne to Bosworth	Ray, Carroll	MO	20:30	40 mi (64 km)	200 yd (180 m)
F2	This tornado moved parallel and 7 miles (11 km) southeast of an F3 tornado that occurred an hour earlier. Homes and barns were damaged or destroyed along its track. Seven injuries occurred at a home near Bosworth.					

=== May 24 event ===
List of confirmed tornadoes – Friday, May 24, 1946
F#	Location	County / Parish	State	Time (local)	Path length	Max width
F2	Near Shullsburg to DeForest	Lafayette, Iowa, Dane	WI	08:00–09:00	60 mi (97 km)	100 yd (91 m)
F2	A long-tracked tornado skipped as it damaged or destroyed several structures. Twenty farms sustained damaged, five homes were unroofed, and several barns were destroyed. About 30 cottages were damaged or destroyed along the western shore of Lake Mendota. This tornado was noted to most likely be a tornado family by Thomas P. Grazulis. The U.S. Weather Bureau published this event as a thundersquall with a width of 100 to 133 yards (91 to 122 m) (a thundersquall is a combined thunderstorm and squall). They also noted that two people were injured by debris, and a third person by lightning.					
FU	Near Shawnee	Pottawatomie	OK	15:30	6 mi (9.7 km)	100 yd (91 m)
FU	The National Weather Service office in Norman, Oklahoma documented this tornado and provided no further information.					
F3	N of Valparaiso, IN to Woodville, IN to New Carlisle, IN to Buchanan, MI	Porter (IN), LaPorte (IN), St. Joseph (IN), Berrien (MI)	IN, MI	15:35	40 mi (64 km)	500 yd (460 m)
F3	A long-tracked tornado skipped as it damaged or destroyed several structures. "Near-F4 damage" occurred in the community of Woodville, where two homes, three barns, and a gas station were obliterated. Several homes were "torn apart" in Hudson Lake and New Carlisle. Near Buchanan multiple barns were leveled. The tornado injured five people and caused $250,000 in damage ($3.75 million in 2022).					
F2	NE of Sapulpa	Creek	OK	15:45	10 mi (16 km)	50 yd (46 m)
F2	This skipping tornado destroyed one home and shifted two others. It also threw a car into a ditch.					
F2	Around Collinsville	Tulsa, Rogers	OK	16:00	10 mi (16 km)	500 yd (460 m)
F2	This tornado destroyed a home and unroofed a dairy barn as it moved northeast and then east around Collinsville. The National Weather Service lists the width for this tornado as 500 yards (460 m).					
F4	W of Granger	Williamson	TX	17:00	7 mi (11 km)	400 yd (370 m)
F4	1 death – A boy was killed and his mother injured in one of two homes completely leveled and swept away by the tornado. Every building on their farm "literally vanished," and all their livestock was killed. The tornado split a nearby house in two, with half of the home "splintered". A large tractor was also moved 50 yards (46 m).					
F2	W of Talihina	Latimer	OK	18:00	>0 mi (0 km)	200 yd (180 m)
F2	A home was destroyed, and another was damaged in Buffalo Valley. The tornado injured two people.					

=== May 29 event ===
List of confirmed tornadoes – Wednesday, May 29, 1946
F#	Location	County / Parish	State	Time (local)	Path length	Max width
F4	Wellsford to Cullison	Kiowa, Pratt	KS	17:00	7 mi (11 km)	400 yd (370 m)
F4	Considerable damage occurred in Cullison, with up to $110,000 ($15 million in 2022) in damage documented by the U.S. Weather Bureau. One farmhouse was swept away, and numerous other farm buildings were destroyed. Five vortex clouds were observed with this tornado.					
F2	NE of Stoneburg or Forestburg	Montague	TX	18:00	>0 mi (0 km)	>0 yd (0 m)
F2	One home was destroyed and another was unroofed. The U.S. Weather Bureau said this tornado struck Forestburg while Grazulis said northeast of Stoneburg.					
FU	Penalosa	Kingman	KS	19:40	>0 mi (0 km)	>0 yd (0 m)
FU	No damage was reported.					
FU	Pratt	Pratt	KS	P.M.	>0 mi (0 km)	>0 yd (0 m)
FU	The U.S. Weather Bureau documented that "chief loss in wheat [ranged] from 25 to 100 percent."					

=== May 30 event ===
List of confirmed tornadoes – Thursday, May 30, 1946
F#	Location	County / Parish	State	Time (local)	Path length	Max width
FU	???	Sumner, Cowley	KS	13:00	>0 mi (0 km)	>0 yd (0 m)
FU	Minor damage occurred to buildings.					
F2	SW of to Arkansas City	Cowley	KS	13:20	5 mi (8.0 km)	30 yd (27 m)
F2	"Homes, barns, and businesses were unroofed."					
F2	Through Creston	Union	IA	14:20	2 mi (3.2 km)	400 yd (370 m)
F2	Warehouses were destroyed, homes unroofed, and 40 railroad cars derailed. About 100 other homes sustained various types of damage from the combined effect of the tornado and accompanying downburst. The tornado caused $250,000 in damage ($3.75 million in 2022).					

=== May 31 event ===
List of confirmed tornadoes – Friday, May 31, 1946
F#	Location	County / Parish	State	Time (local)	Path length	Max width
FU	Arkansas City	Cowley	KS	14:15	5 mi (8.0 km)	13 yd (12 m)
FU	The tornado caused property damage.					
F2	S of Fort Recovery to Sharpsburg	Mercer	OH	16:05 or 17:30	5 mi (8.0 km)	200 yd (180 m)
F2	Multiple buildings on four farms were destroyed and several homes were unroofed or damaged.					

== June ==
Confirmed tornadoes by Fujita rating
FU	F0	F1	F2	F3	F4	F5	Total
≥2	≥0	≥0	6	3	1	0	≥12

=== June 6 event ===
List of confirmed tornadoes – Thursday, June 6, 1946
F#	Location	County / Parish	State	Time (local)	Path length	Max width
F2	Moose Lake to Barnum	Carlton	MN	19:00 or 19:45-21:45	15 mi (24 km)	8,800 yd (8,000 m)
F2	About 41 rural buildings were destroyed, two people injured, and hundreds of animals killed. A downburst associated with this storm damaged 25 homes; three homes were destroyed, but it was unknown if they were destroyed by the tornado or downburst. The U.S. Weather Bureau documented this as a "small tornado" with hail.					

=== June 7 event ===
List of confirmed tornadoes – Friday, June 7, 1946
F#	Location	County / Parish	State	Time (local)	Path length	Max width
F3	Froid	Roosevelt	MT	14:00	10 mi (16 km)	200 yd (180 m)
F3	1 death – A five-room farmhouse was "nearly leveled", and one person was crushed by its chimney. A farm building was destroyed, furniture was thrown nearly a mile, and spruce trees were damaged. One person was killed, another was injured and damage totaled $12,500 ($187,600 in 2022).					

=== June 10 event ===
List of confirmed tornadoes – Monday, June 10, 1946
F#	Location	County / Parish	State	Time (local)	Path length	Max width
FU	Wibaux	Wibaux	MT	2:30–3:00	>0 mi (0 km)	>0 yd (0 m)
FU	Limited crop loss was noted, along with the loss of 500 livestock. Damage totaled $25,000 (which is equivalent to $375,000 in 2022).					

=== June 11 event ===
List of confirmed tornadoes – Tuesday, June 11, 1946
F#	Location	County / Parish	State	Time (local)	Path length	Max width
F2	NW of Waterloo	DeKalb	IN	17:30 or 18:15	2 to 7 mi (3.2 to 11.3 km)	400 to 900 yd (370 to 820 m)
F2	This zig-zagging tornado destroyed three barns, a vacant home, and several outbuildings on 11 farms.					

=== June 16 event ===
List of confirmed tornadoes – Sunday, June 16, 1946
F#	Location	County / Parish	State	Time (local)	Path length	Max width
F2	S Ledyard	Kossuth	IA	18:00 or 19:00-20:00	5 mi (8.0 km)	14,080 yd (12,870 m)
F2	Buildings on eight farms were damaged, with barns on four being destroyed. This tornado was accompanied by a damaging hailstorm, causing a total of $610,000 in damages ($9.15 million in 2022).					
F2	Racine	Mower	MN	20:22	8 mi (13 km)	167 to 170 yd (153 to 155 m)
F2	A schoolhouse was leveled, multiple windmills were wrecked, and trees were uprooted. Farm machinery was also destroyed, as well as several buildings on five farms.					

=== June 17 event ===
List of confirmed tornadoes – Monday, June 17, 1946
F#	Location	County / Parish	State	Time (local)	Path length	Max width
F4	Detroit (MI) to Windsor (ON)	Wayne (MI), Essex (ON)	MI, ON	17:55–18:05	40 mi (64 km)	200 yd (180 m)
F4	17 deaths in Canada – See article on this tornado. At least 200 people were injured across the United States and Canada. Thomas P. Grazulis documents 15 deaths from this tornado.					

=== June 23 event ===
List of confirmed tornadoes – Sunday, June 23, 1946
F#	Location	County / Parish	State	Time (local)	Path length	Max width
F3	N of Selfridge	Sioux	ND	14:30	4 mi (6.4 km)	200 yd (180 m)
F3	A home was destroyed, with only one wall left standing, a second home had its second floor sheared off. Buildings on three farms were also destroyed. Two people were injured by the tornado.					
F3	S of Selfridge	Sioux	ND	14:30	8 mi (13 km)	200 yd (180 m)
F3	Every single building on a farm was obliterated and "not a board could be found intact" from any of the buildings.					

=== June 26 event ===
List of confirmed tornadoes – Friday, June 26, 1946
F#	Location	County / Parish	State	Time (local)	Path length	Max width
F2	Cowden	Washita	OK	18:45	2 mi (3.2 km)	445 yd (407 m)
F2	A school gymnasium, two business houses, and several residential homes were destroyed. Damage was totaled at $74,500 ($1.12 million in 2022).					

=== June 27 event ===
List of confirmed tornadoes – Friday, June 27, 1946
F#	Location	County / Parish	State	Time (local)	Path length	Max width
F2	Detroit (MI), Windsor (ON)	Wayne (MI), Essex (ON)	MI, ON	14:37 or 15:30-15:33	3 mi (4.8 km)	200 yd (180 m)
F2	Bus and trailer garages were damaged, along with a manufacturing company, a warehouse, and parked cars. The worst damage from the tornado was in northeastern Detroit. In total, nine people were injured and $400,000 ($6 million in 2022) in damage occurred in the United States.					

=== June 28 event ===
List of confirmed tornadoes – Friday, June 28, 1946
F#	Location	County / Parish	State	Time (local)	Path length	Max width
FU	???	Polk, Red Lake, Pennington	MN	2:30	0 mi (0 km)	>15 yd (14 m)
FU	The U.S. Weather Bureau notes a flax manufacturing plant, a school, a garage, farm homes, 66 farms and 40 outbuildings being destroyed by a "possible tornado". The storm also damaged 110 homes, 135 barns, 55 outbuildings, 40 silos, a municipal sewage disposal plant, and an airplane. Wires and poles were downed as well, and several thousand turkeys and chickens were killed. Four people were injured.					

== July ==
Confirmed tornadoes by Fujita rating
FU	F0	F1	F2	F3	F4	F5	Total
≥12	≥0	≥1	5	0	0	0	≥18

=== July 1 event ===
List of confirmed tornadoes – Monday, July 1, 1946
F#	Location	County / Parish	State	Time (local)	Path length	Max width
FU	Laramie	Albany	WY	14:00	>0 mi (0 km)	>0 yd (0 m)
FU	A tornado reported east-southeast of the Laramie Airport failed to reach the ground, causing no damage.					
F2	W of Bennett	Adams	CO	15:00	4 mi (6.4 km)	50 yd (46 m)
F2	Two homes were unroofed and multiple businesses were "torn apart".					
F2	N of Bennett	Adams	CO	15:00	>0 mi (0 km)	100 yd (91 m)
F2	A home was unroofed and a barn was destroyed. The barn’s owner was watching a separate tornado in the distance while this tornado struck.					
FU	Bennett	Adams	CO	15:00	>0 mi (0 km)	>0 yd (0 m)
FU	One of six tornadoes in the Bennett area.					
FU	Bennett	Adams	CO	15:00	>0 mi (0 km)	>0 yd (0 m)
FU	One of six tornadoes in the Bennett area.					
FU	Bennett	Adams	CO	15:00	>0 mi (0 km)	>0 yd (0 m)
FU	One of six tornadoes in the Bennett area.					
FU	Bennett	Adams	CO	15:00	>0 mi (0 km)	>0 yd (0 m)
FU	One of six tornadoes in the Bennett area.					

=== July 4 event ===
List of confirmed tornadoes – Thursday, July 4, 1946
F#	Location	County / Parish	State	Time (local)	Path length	Max width
FU	Carpenter	Laramie	WY	16:00	>0 mi (0 km)	>0 yd (0 m)
FU	No damage was reported.					
FU	Cheyenne	Laramie	WY	16:15	>0 mi (0 km)	>0 yd (0 m)
FU	No damage was reported. This tornado was produced by the same storm as the previous one.					

=== July 5 event ===
List of confirmed tornadoes – Friday, July 5, 1946
F#	Location	County / Parish	State	Time (local)	Path length	Max width
F2	Harahan to Metairie to Ridge to New Orleans	Jefferson	LA	20:20–20:30	5 mi (8.0 km)	100 yd (91 m)
F2	This skipping tornado unroofed two businesses and three homes, stripping the wallpaper in one. A little crop damage was also reported.					

=== July 6 event ===
List of confirmed tornadoes – Saturday, July 6, 1946
F#	Location	County / Parish	State	Time (local)	Path length	Max width
FU	Hilliard	Nassau	FL	P.M.	>0 mi (0 km)	>0 yd (0 m)
FU	This small tornado caused no damage.					

=== July 13 event ===
List of confirmed tornadoes – Saturday, July 13, 1946
F#	Location	County / Parish	State	Time (local)	Path length	Max width
FU	Edgar	Carbon	MT	15:30	>0 mi (0 km)	15 yd (14 m)
FU	A farm building was damaged.					

=== July 14 event ===
List of confirmed tornadoes – Sunday, July 14, 1946
F#	Location	County / Parish	State	Time (local)	Path length	Max width
F2	East Helena	Lewis and Clark	MT	17:15–17:16	>0 mi (0 km)	50 yd (46 m)
F2	One farmstead sustained damage, a large barn was destroyed and a home damaged. The U.S. Weather Bureau documents "blinding dust" accompanying this "small tornado".					

=== July 19 event ===
List of confirmed tornadoes – Friday, July 19, 1946
F#	Location	County / Parish	State	Time (local)	Path length	Max width
FU	Stengel Air College to Gainesville	Alachua	FL	16:00–16:30	>0 mi (0 km)	>0 yd (0 m)
FU	At Stengel Air College a main hangar, shops, and cottages were damaged. Damage also occurred in Gainesville.					

=== July 22 event ===
List of confirmed tornadoes – Monday, July 22, 1946
F#	Location	County / Parish	State	Time (local)	Path length	Max width
FU	Houma	Terrebonne	LA	14:00	>0 mi (0 km)	100 yd (91 m)
FU	Chief damage occurred to buildings.					
FU	Crowley	Acadia	LA	15:15	>0 mi (0 km)	100 yd (91 m)
FU	Small damage was reported from the tornado.					

=== July 23 event ===
List of confirmed tornadoes – Tuesday, July 23, 1946
F#	Location	County / Parish	State	Time (local)	Path length	Max width
F1	Vicinity around Concord	Merrimack	NH	??:??	>0 mi (0 km)	>0 yd (0 m)
F1	1 death – Tornadic winds caused damage to northwestern parts of Concord, including a National Guard Arsenal, which leveled a 150-foot (46 m) section of a steel and brick building, destroying machinery and damaging army vehicles. Eight homes and several small buildings were destroyed, including the collapse of a barn, which killed a boy. Damages totaled $60,000 ($900,000 in 2022).					

=== July 30 event ===
List of confirmed tornadoes – Tuesday, July 30, 1946
F#	Location	County / Parish	State	Time (local)	Path length	Max width
F2	St. Petersburg	Pinellas	FL	19:00	>0 mi (0 km)	>0 yd (0 m)
F2	The U.S. Weather Bureau documented a tornado near St. Petersburg, Pinellas County, Florida which demolished a garage, unroofed a two-story frame house, and caused an additional $150,000 in damages (equivalent to $2.25 million in 2022).					

== August ==
Confirmed tornadoes by Fujita rating
FU	F0	F1	F2	F3	F4	F5	Total
≥2	≥0	≥0	0	0	2	0	≥4

=== August 5 event ===
List of confirmed tornadoes – Monday, August 5, 1946
F#	Location	County / Parish	State	Time (local)	Path length	Max width
FU	Hutchinson	Reno	KS	02:00–05:30	>0 mi (0 km)	>0 yd (0 m)
FU	This "small tornado" never reached the ground. However, it damaged multiple buildings and roofs. Thomas P. Grazulis did not rate it.					

=== August 13 event ===
List of confirmed tornadoes – Tuesday, August 13, 1946
F#	Location	County / Parish	State	Time (local)	Path length	Max width
FU	Niagara Falls	Niagara	NY	11:30–12:15	>0 mi (0 km)	33 yd (30 m)
FU	This tornado blew a man off a horse, destroyed two garages, and threw a boulder that destroyed the side of a house. It did not receive a rating on the Fujita scale from Thomas P. Grazulis.					

=== August 17 event ===
-
F#	Location	County / Parish	State	Time (local)	Path length	Max width
F4	SW of Mankato to North Mankato	Blue Earth	MN	18:40	9 mi (14 km)	400 to 440 yd (370 to 400 m)
F4	11 deaths – At least eight farms and three homes were destroyed. All eleven deaths and most of the 100 injuries occurred during the complete obliteration of 26 cabins in Green Gables camp southwest of Mankato. Multiple cars were thrown at least 500 feet (170 yd; 150 m) and a 54,000 pounds (24,000 kg) road grader was thrown 100 feet (33 yd; 30 m). The U.S. Weather Bureau noted hundreds of trees uprooted, and the death of over 1,000 turkeys. In total, the tornado killed eleven people, injured at least 100 others and caused $300,000 in damage (equivalent to $4.5 million in 2022).					
F4	SW of to Wells	Faribault	MN	19:30–19:48	7 mi (11 km)	200 yd (180 m)
F4	Southwest of Wells several buildings on two farms were severely damaged, with one of them sustaining F4 damage. The tornado hit downtown Wells at F2 intensity, damaging or destroying nearly every building in the business district; a theatre with at least 400 people inside collapsed. Hundreds of trees were noted to have been uprooted. In total, the tornado injured 30 people and caused $700,000 in damage (equivalent to $10.5 million in 2022). The U.S. Weather Bureau documented the damage to the theatre as "high wind" rather than a tornado.					

== September ==
Confirmed tornadoes by Fujita rating
FU	F0	F1	F2	F3	F4	F5	Total
≥3	≥0	≥0	4	0	0	0	≥7

=== September 2 event ===
List of confirmed tornadoes – Monday, September 2, 1946
F#	Location	County / Parish	State	Time (local)	Path length	Max width
F2	SW of Eskridge to NE of Alma	Wabaunsee	KS	12:00	20 mi (32 km)	30 yd (27 m)
F2	This skipping tornado destroyed a large barn.					

=== September 10 event ===
List of confirmed tornadoes – Tuesday, September 10, 1946
F#	Location	County / Parish	State	Time (local)	Path length	Max width
FU	Albion	Calhoun	MI	7:27–7:31	>0 mi (0 km)	300 yd (270 m)
FU	The U.S. Weather Bureau reports 100 trees downed at a cemetery and 50 at a park.					
FU	Portland	Cumberland	ME	14:50–15:10	>0 mi (0 km)	>0 yd (0 m)
FU	The U.S. Weather Bureau documents a tornado damaging northern suburbs of Portland, with two residences damaged, two barns leveled, and a garage unroofed; shade and pine trees were felled, and evidence of counterclock-wise wind movement was noted.					

=== September 16 event ===
List of confirmed tornadoes – Monday, September 16, 1946
F#	Location	County / Parish	State	Time (local)	Path length	Max width
F2	Near Sidney	Richland (MT)	MT, ND	17:15	20 mi (32 km)	8 to 50 yd (7.3 to 45.7 m)
F2	A small home was destroyed near Sidney and four people were injured. The U.S. Weather Bureau reports the tornado continuing into western North Dakota.					

=== September 22 event ===
List of confirmed tornadoes – Sunday, September 22, 1946
F#	Location	County / Parish	State	Time (local)	Path length	Max width
F2	Mableton	Cobb	GA	15:05	0.3 mi (0.48 km)	75 yd (69 m)
F2	One home was destroyed, and four people were injured.					
FU	Lake Delton	Sauk	WI	17:55–18:10	>0 mi (0 km)	27 yd (25 m)
FU	The U.S. Weather Bureau documents damage to McBoyle Airport, where a trees were downed and a hangar was unroofed, damaging three airplanes and six vehicles. The storm that produced the tornado was noted moving southwest to northeast, with rotary winds.					

=== September 24 event ===
List of confirmed tornadoes – Tuesday, September 24, 1946
F#	Location	County / Parish	State	Time (local)	Path length	Max width
F2	Escanaba	Delta	MI	12:46–12:47 or 13:46	3 mi (4.8 km)	1 to 200 yd (0.91 to 182.88 m)
F2	One home was unroofed by the tornado and over $300,000 in damage ($4.5 million in 2022) occurred to coal-loading equipment and loading docks.					

== October ==
Confirmed tornadoes by Fujita rating
FU	F0	F1	F2	F3	F4	F5	Total
≥0	≥0	≥0	2	1	0	0	≥3

=== October 17 event ===
List of confirmed tornadoes – Thursday, October 17, 1946
F#	Location	County / Parish	State	Time (local)	Path length	Max width
F2	SE of Appleton City	St. Clair	MO	15:00	2 mi (3.2 km)	50 yd (46 m)
F2	A barn was destroyed and scattered, and the east side of a farmhouse was torn off. Multiple livestock were killed on two farms.					
F3	SW of Goodland to Twin Oaks	Choctaw	OK	17:30–18:00	7 mi (11 km)	100 to 200 yd (91 to 183 m)
F3	Homes, farm buildings, and several school buildings at Goodland Indian School were damaged or destroyed.					

=== October 18 event ===
List of confirmed tornadoes – Friday, October 18, 1946
F#	Location	County / Parish	State	Time (local)	Path length	Max width
F2	Greenwood	Johnson	IN	04:35	1 mi (1.6 km)	30 to 33 yd (27 to 30 m)
F2	Several buildings and two airplanes were destroyed and multiple trees and power lines were downed.					

== November ==
Confirmed tornadoes by Fujita rating
FU	F0	F1	F2	F3	F4	F5	Total
≥0	≥0	≥0	4	1	0	0	≥5

=== November 2 event ===
List of confirmed tornadoes – Saturday, November 2, 1946
F#	Location	County / Parish	State	Time (local)	Path length	Max width
F3	SSW of Washington	Hempstead	AR	14:30 or 15:30	5 mi (8.0 km)	150 to 200 yd (140 to 180 m)
F3	1 death (died from injuries two weeks after the storm) – A tornado destroyed numerous residential areas and business offices, badly damaged a cotton gin, and flattened a service station, causing communication disruptions. Downed power lines caused outages in the northern portion of Hempstead County, while Washington, Arkansas was isolated from communication outside of the city, and had a famous landmark, an old church building, destroyed.					

=== November 10 event ===
List of confirmed tornadoes – Sunday, November 10, 1946
F#	Location	County / Parish	State	Time (local)	Path length	Max width
F2	Calvert	Mobile, Washington	AL	??:??	4 to 5 mi (6.4 to 8.0 km)	>0 yd (0 m)
F2	Three homes were destroyed.					
F2	S of Rayne to N of Lafayette	Acadia, Lafayette	LA	17:00	>0 mi (0 km)	880 yd (800 m)
F2	Several barns and outbuildings were demolished and multiple homes were "twisted" from their foundations. In total, three people were injured by this skipping tornado.					
F2	Near Mississippi River	Pointe Coupee	LA	17:00	2 to 10 mi (3.2 to 16.1 km)	50 yd (46 m)
F2	2 deaths – On two plantations multiple barns and sheds were destroyed, killing a mother and child, and injuring eight others. Also damaged were a church and three homes, two of which were described as "frail".					
F2	Hattiesburg	Forrest or Lamar	MS	21:00	1 mi (1.6 km)	100 to 400 yd (91 to 366 m)
F2	This tornado dipped and rose along its path as it unroofed several lumber buildings and damaged, unroofed or shifted a dozen homes. The U.S. Weather Bureau reports a forward speed of 50 miles per hour (80 km/h) and states that this may have been the same tornado that hit Point Coupee Parish earlier in the day.					

== December ==
Confirmed tornadoes by Fujita rating
FU	F0	F1	F2	F3	F4	F5	Total
≥0	≥0	≥0	3	0	0	0	≥3

=== December 28 event ===
List of confirmed tornadoes – Saturday, December 28, 1946
F#	Location	County / Parish	State	Time (local)	Path length	Max width
F2	W of Newhope to E of Langley to SE of Mount Ida	Howard, Pike, Montgomery	AR	17:00	25 mi (40 km)	400 yd (370 m)
F2	According to Grazulis the "losses included dozens of homes and thousands of trees." In total, 21 people were injured.					
F2	Ouachita National Forest to S of Jessieville	Garland	AR	18:00	15 mi (24 km)	100 yd (91 m)
F2	Two were injured and south of Jessieville, near the Blakely community, two homes, two trucks, and a gas station were destroyed.					

=== December 29 event ===
List of confirmed tornadoes – Sunday, December 29, 1946
F#	Location	County / Parish	State	Time (local)	Path length	Max width
F2	Fort Campbell	Christian, Todd	KY	00:15–01:30	10 mi (16 km)	100 to 800 yd (91 to 732 m)
F2	This "bouncing type of tornado" hit Camp Campbell, where it destroyed military equipment and several storage buildings. Also destroyed were tobacco and stock barns, and about a hundred trucks. In total, the tornado injured at least six people and caused $300,000 in damage ($4.5 million in 2022). The U.S. Weather Bureau reports a width between 100 and 800 yards (91–732 m) while Grazulis says 400 yards (370 m).					

== See also ==
- Tornadoes of 1946
- List of North American tornadoes and tornado outbreaks
- Weather of 1946
