= Tornado outbreak of May 23–24, 1946 =

U.S. tornado outbreak

Meteorological history
- Duration: May 23–24, 1946

Tornado outbreak
- Tornadoes: ≥17
- Max. rating: F4 tornado
- Duration: 30 hours

Overall effects
- Fatalities: 4
- Injuries: 42
- Damage: ≥$699,000 (1946 USD)
- Areas affected: Central United States
- Part of the tornado outbreaks of 1946

On May 23–24, 1946, a tornado outbreak occurred across the Central and Midwestern United States. Over two days at least 15 significant tornadoes struck parts of Kansas, Nebraska and Oklahoma, killing four people and injuring 42 others. The storm system also caused numerous other impacts including hail, heavy rains, and damaging lightning strikes.

== Confirmed tornadoes ==
This weather event happened before the invention of an official ratings system for tornadoes in 1950. The events were later assessed by tornado expert Thomas P. Grazulis, and rated unofficially on the Fujita scale. Grazulis documented 15 significant tornadoes (F2+), but the true number of tornadoes for this outbreak is most likely higher.

Confirmed tornadoes by Fujita rating
FU	F0	F1	F2	F3	F4	F5	Total
≥ 2	≥ 0	≥ 0	7	5	3	0	≥17

=== May 23 event ===
List of confirmed tornadoes – Thursday, May 23, 1946 (Note: All dates and times are based on the local time zone where the tornado touched down.)
F# (Note: All ratings on the Fujita scale were done by Thomas P. Grazulis, a tornado expert, and are classified unofficial ratings since official ratings for tornadoes began in 1950.)	Location	County / Parish	State	Time (local)	Path length	Max width
FU	Wheat fields	Rooks	KS	12:00–13:00	6 mi (9.7 km)	2,600 yd (2,400 m)
FU	A large tornado caused a six-mile-long damage path through wheat fields according to the U.S. Weather Bureau. This tornado did not receive a rating on the Fujita scale from Thomas P. Grazulis, indicating Grazulis estimates F0 to F1 intensity.					
F4	SW of Enosdale to W of Washington	Washington	KS	14:00	14 mi (23 km)	600 yd (550 m)
F4	1 death – A violent tornado struck west of the community of Enosdale, where eight farms were severely damaged. Two farmhouses were completely swept off their foundations, killing an elderly woman. In total, six people were injured and 70 head of livestock were killed. The U.S. Weather Bureau published the tornado's path length as 20 miles (32 km).					
F4	E of Washington to Emmons	Washington	KS	15:15	8 mi (13 km)	600 yd (550 m)
F4	This violent tornado traveled a path nearly parallel to the previous tornado. East of Washington a farmhouse was completely leveled, five others were damaged near the community of Emmons. The tornado injured two people and caused $100,000 in damage ($1.5 million in 2022). The U.S. Weather Bureau published the tornado's width as 440 yards (400 m).					
F3	NNE of Home, KS to W of Summerfield, KS to SSE of Liberty, NE	Marshall (KS), Gage (NE)	KS, NE	15:30	10 mi (16 km)	300 yd (270 m)
F3	Several buildings across six farms were destroyed, on one farm only the house was left standing. Two people were injured.					
F3	NE of Craig to W of Skidmore to NW of Pickering	Holt, Atchison, Nodaway	MO	17:00	35 mi (56 km)	300 yd (270 m)
F3	An intense tornado, which was described as having "feelers" extending around the main funnel, damaged or destroyed multiple structures. Three homes sustained "near-F4 damage". A roast was found in a car thrown into a tree, with parts of the refrigerator it had been in thrown 0.5 mi (0.80 km). The tornado injured four people and caused $335,000 in damage ($5.03 million in 2022). Thomas P. Grazulis notes this was likely a tornado family.					
F2	SE of Monrovia to SW of Atchison	Atchison	KS	18:00	10 mi (16 km)	400 yd (370 m)
F2	A home had its roof ripped off and six barns were destroyed.					
F3	S of Martin City to Holmes Park to Kansas City	Jackson	MO	18:25	11 mi (18 km)	600 yd (550 m)
F3	2 deaths – South of Martin City, the tornado destroyed a barn and silo. It then struck Holmes Park "with full force" before lifting in the southeastern portion of Swope Park. An elderly couple was killed when their home was completely destroyed and carried 100 yards (91 m). Five other people were injured.					
F3	NE of Richmond to SE of Stet to NW of Tina	Ray, Carroll	MO	19:30	40 mi (64 km)	200 yd (180 m)
F3	A long-tracked and intense tornado damaged or destroyed numerous homes and barns. "Near-F4 damage" occurred at a farm west of Bogard. The total damage for this tornado and a parallel F2 tornado, which occurred an hour later, was $500,000 ($7.5 million in 2022). Between the two tornadoes, fifty homes were damaged or destroyed.					
F2	NE of Parkville to Kansas City	Platte, Clay	MO	19:30	5 mi (8.0 km)	70 yd (64 m)
F2	The tornado destroyed a barn, and a few homes in Barry and Gashland (modern day Kansas City) were torn apart.					
F2	N of Wellington to NW of Norborne to Bosworth	Ray, Carroll	MO	20:30	40 mi (64 km)	200 yd (180 m)
F2	This tornado moved parallel and 7 miles (11 km) southeast of an F3 tornado that occurred an hour earlier. Homes and barns were damaged or destroyed along its track. Seven injuries occurred at a home near Bosworth.					

=== May 24 event ===
List of confirmed tornadoes – Friday, May 24, 1946
F#	Location	County / Parish	State	Time (local)	Path length	Max width
F2	Near Shullsburg to DeForest	Lafayette, Iowa, Dane	WI	08:00–09:00	60 mi (97 km)	100 yd (91 m)
F2	A long-tracked tornado skipped as it damaged or destroyed several structures. Twenty farms sustained damaged, five homes were unroofed, and several barns were destroyed. About 30 cottages were damaged or destroyed along the western shore of Lake Mendota. This tornado was noted to most likely be a tornado family by Thomas P. Grazulis. The U.S. Weather Bureau published this event as a thundersquall with a width of 100 to 133 yards (91 to 122 m) (a thundersquall is a combined thunderstorm and squall). They also noted that two people were injured by debris, and a third person by lightning.					
FU	Near Shawnee	Pottawatomie	OK	15:30	6 mi (9.7 km)	100 yd (91 m)
FU	The National Weather Service office in Norman, Oklahoma documented this tornado and provided no further information.					
F3	N of Valparaiso, IN to Woodville, IN to New Carlisle, IN to Buchanan, MI	Porter (IN), LaPorte (IN), St. Joseph (IN), Berrien (MI)	IN, MI	15:35	40 mi (64 km)	500 yd (460 m)
F3	A long-tracked tornado skipped as it damaged or destroyed several structures. "Near-F4 damage" occurred in the community of Woodville, where two homes, three barns, and a gas station were obliterated. Several homes were "torn apart" in Hudson Lake and New Carlisle. Near Buchanan multiple barns were leveled. The tornado injured five people and caused $250,000 in damage ($3.75 million in 2022).					
F2	NE of Sapulpa	Creek	OK	15:45	10 mi (16 km)	50 yd (46 m)
F2	This skipping tornado destroyed one home and shifted two others. It also threw a car into a ditch.					
F2	Around Collinsville	Tulsa, Rogers	OK	16:00	10 mi (16 km)	500 yd (460 m)
F2	This tornado destroyed a home and unroofed a dairy barn as it moved northeast and then east around Collinsville. The National Weather Service lists the width for this tornado as 500 yards (460 m).					
F4	W of Granger	Williamson	TX	17:00	7 mi (11 km)	400 yd (370 m)
F4	1 death – A boy was killed and his mother injured in one of two homes completely leveled and swept away by the tornado. Every building on their farm "literally vanished," and all their livestock was killed. The tornado split a nearby house in two, with half of the home "splintered". A large tractor was also moved 50 yards (46 m).					
F2	W of Talihina	Latimer	OK	18:00	>0 mi (0 km)	200 yd (180 m)
F2	A home was destroyed, and another was damaged in Buffalo Valley. The tornado injured two people.					

== Non-tornadic impacts ==
A hailstorm impacted York County, Nebraska on May 23, causing $50,000 in damage to wheat crops. An electrical storm struck Oklahoma City, Oklahoma and surrounding areas which damaged several structures from lightning strikes. Rainfall led to flooding which caused damage to crops in Haigler, Nebraska.

== See also ==
- Tornadoes of 1946
- List of United States tornadoes in 1946
- List of F4 and EF4 tornadoes
