= Tornadoes of 1946 =

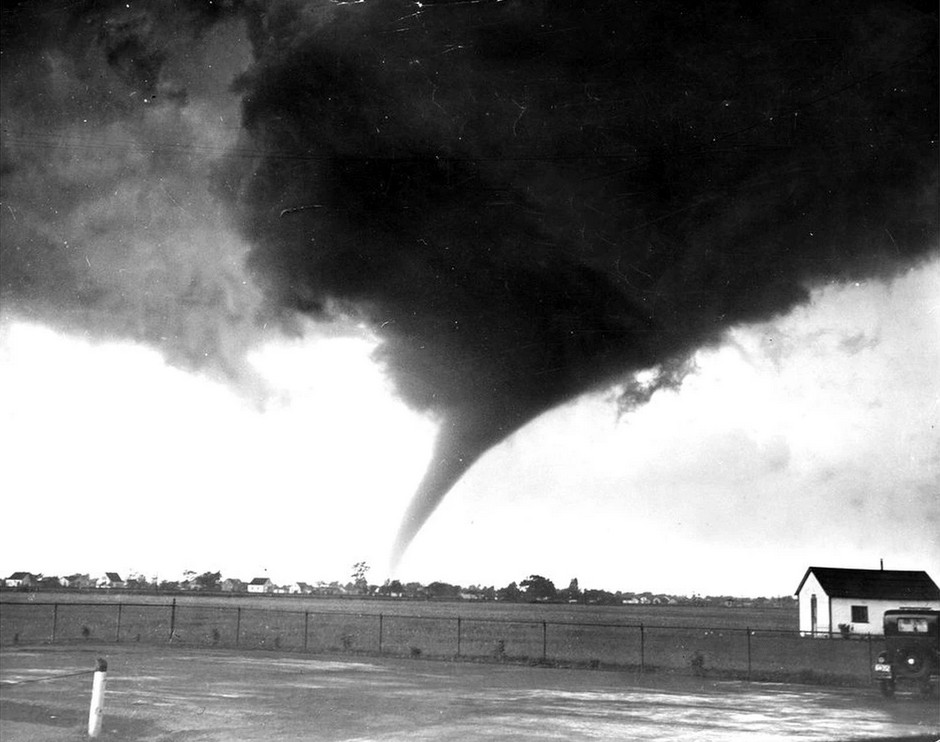
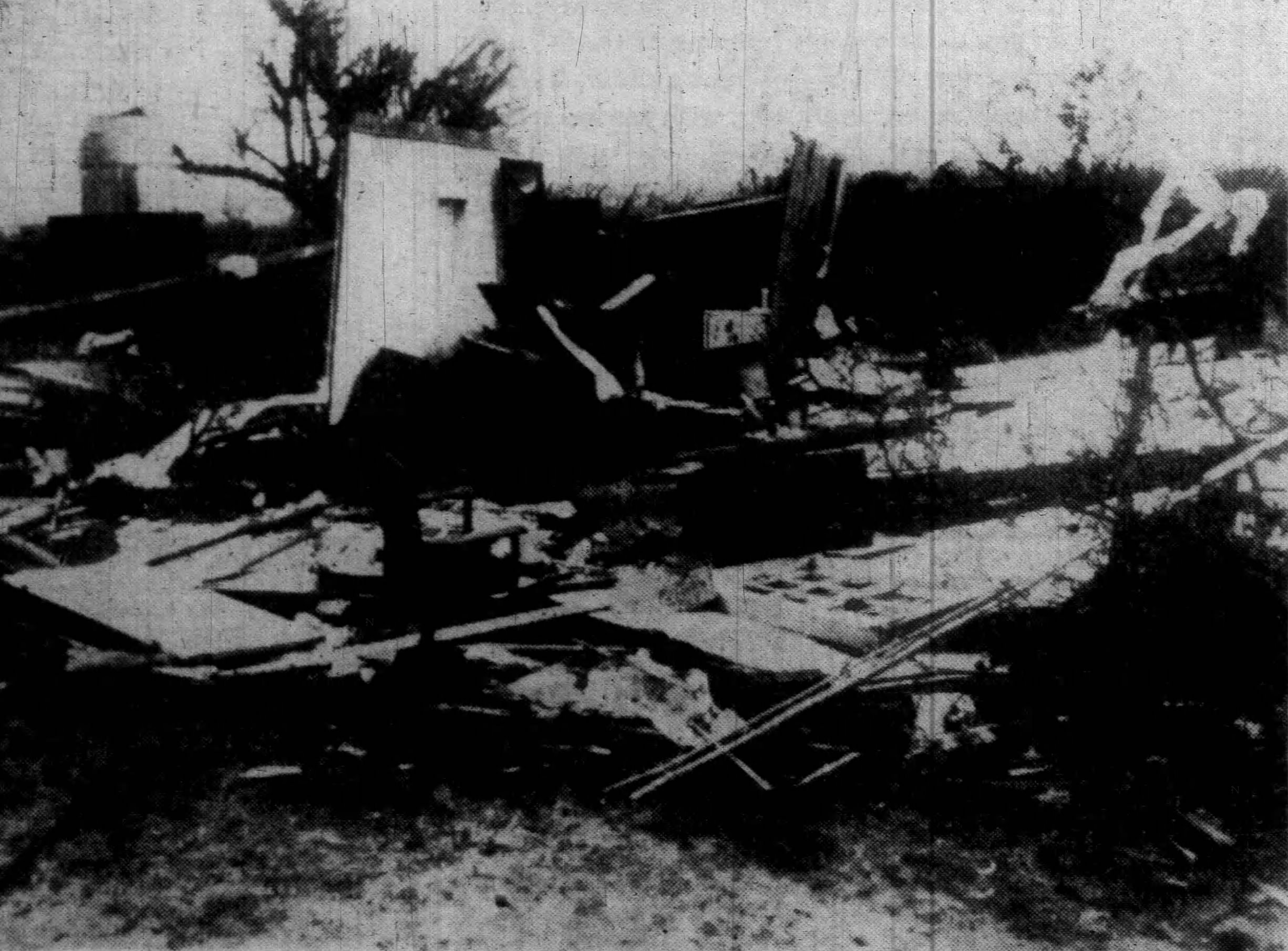
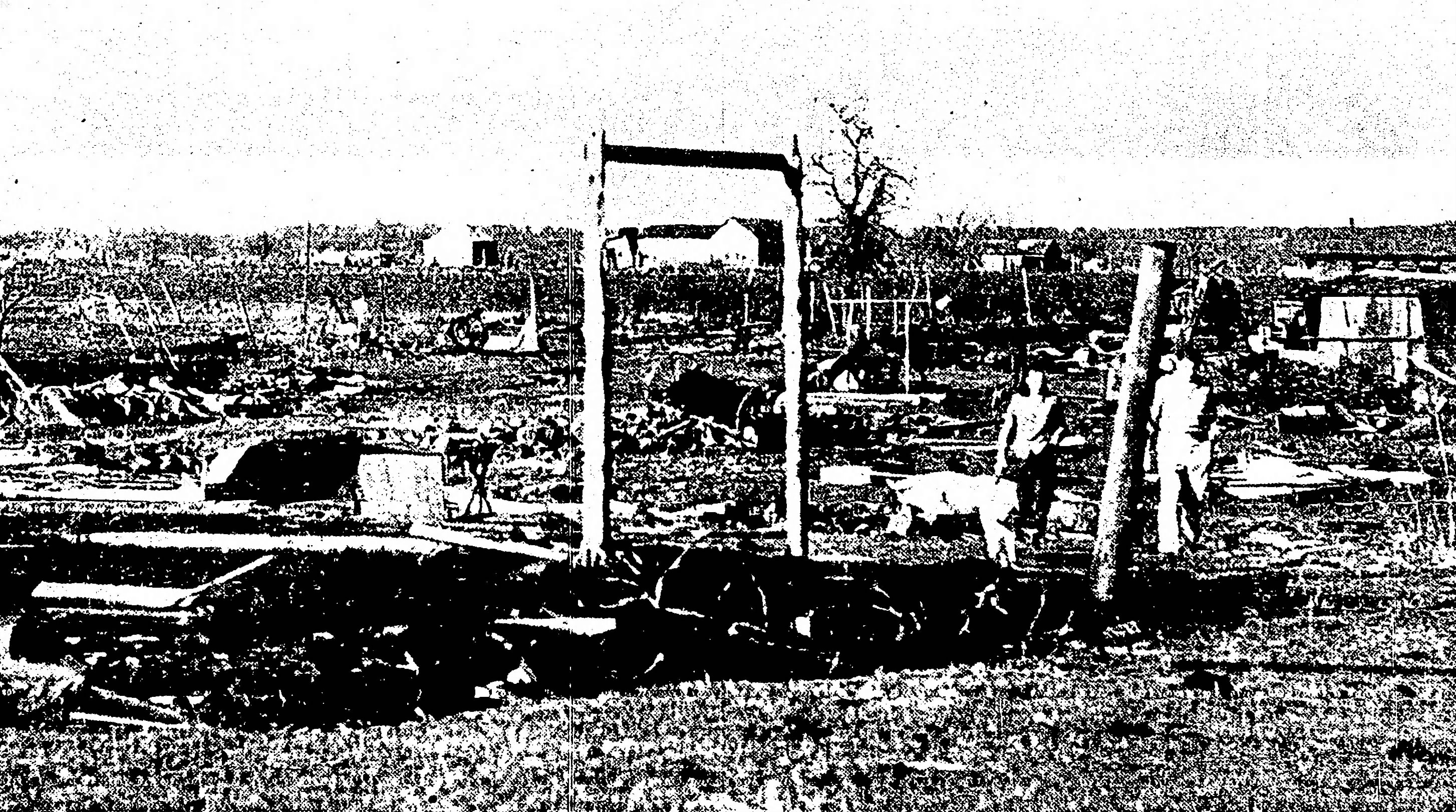
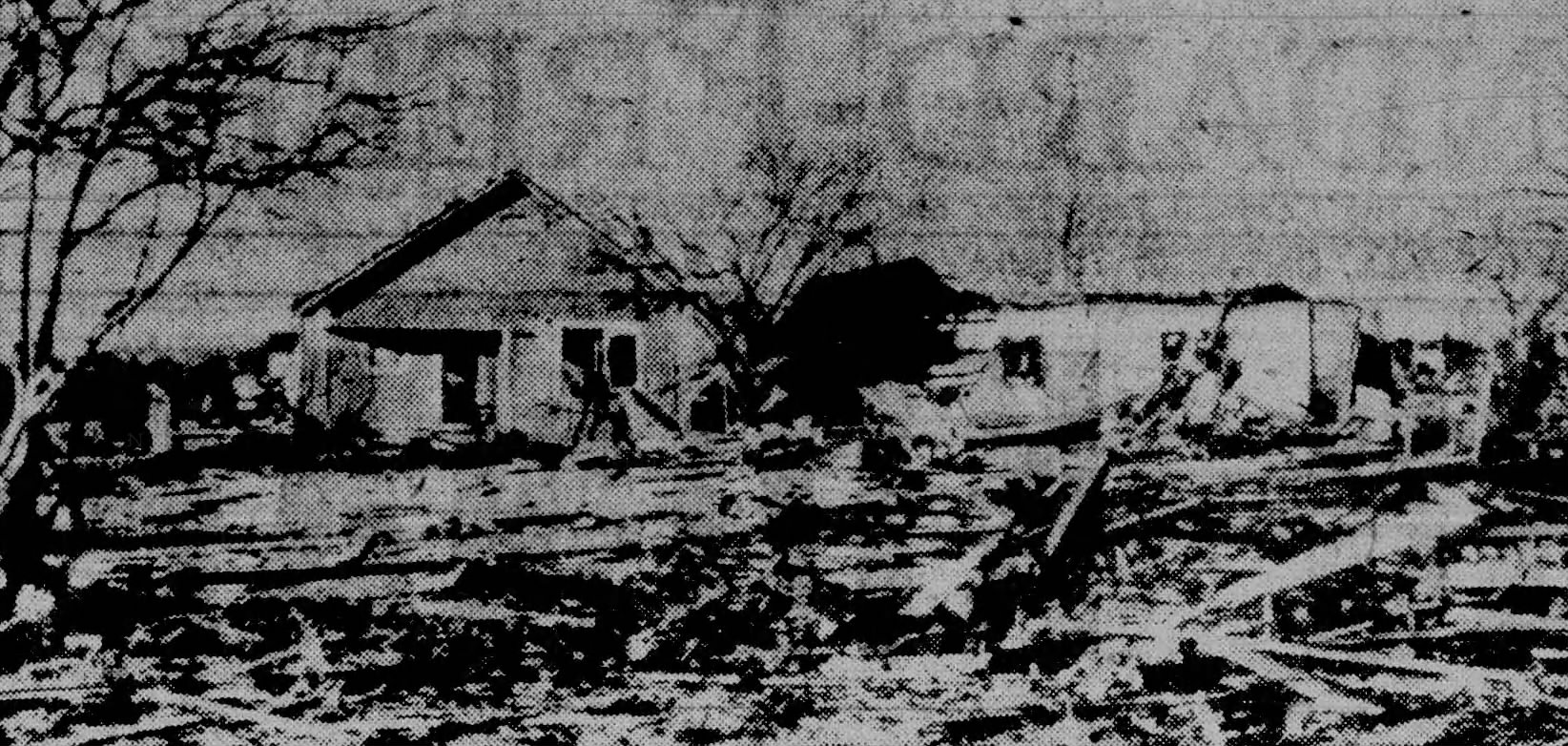
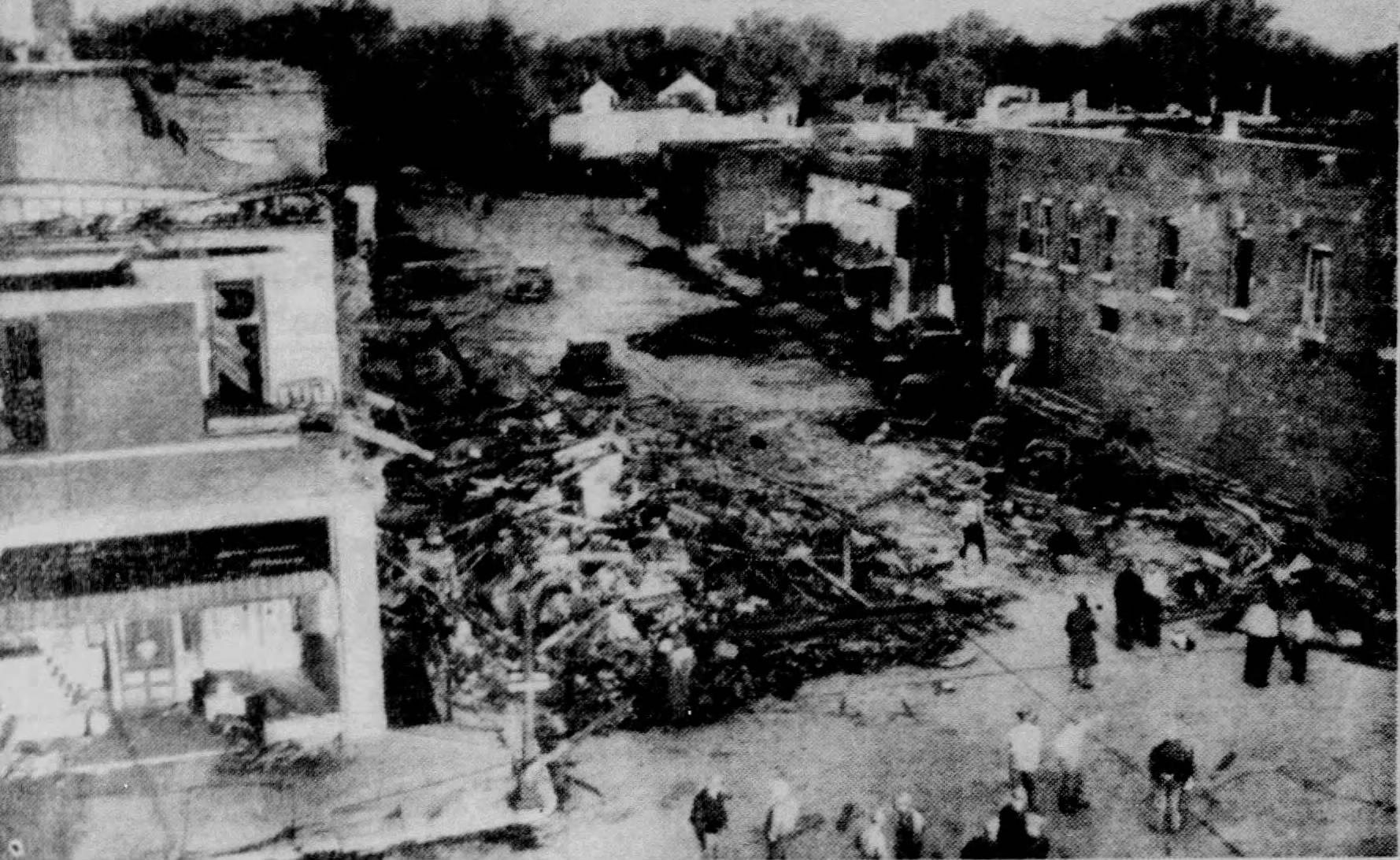
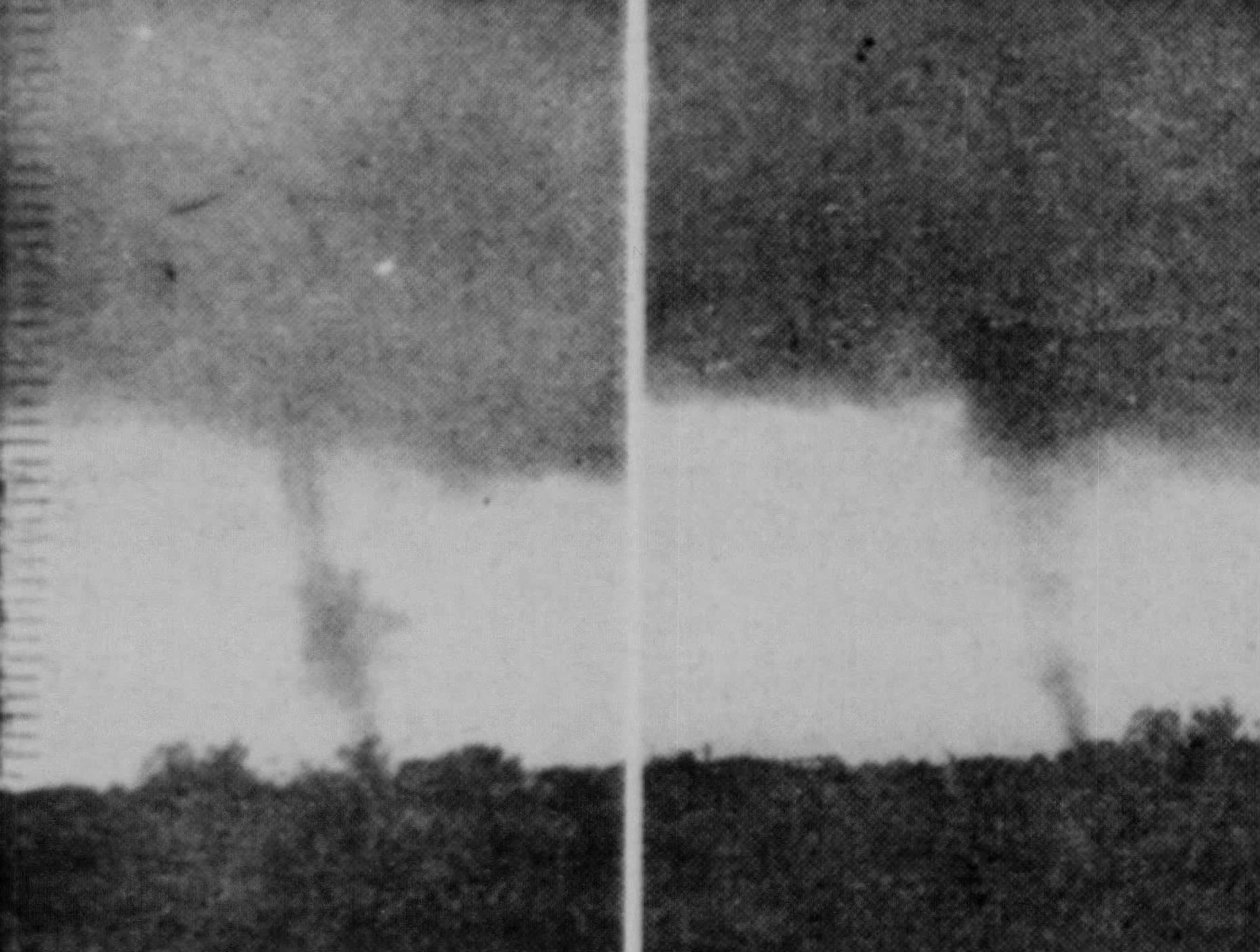
- Clockwise from top: A deadly F4 tornado that struck Windsor, Ontario on June 17; Damage to a farm in Wynona, Oklahoma after an F4 tornado on March 22; Downtown Wells, Minnesota after a violent F4 tornado on August 17; A tornado near Edcouch, Texas on September 15; Damage to Palestine, Texas after a violent F4 tornado on January 4; A home that was destroyed by an F4 tornado in Champion, Texas on May 15.
- Timespan: January 4 — December 29
Maximum rated tornado
F4 tornado
- (2 official & 14 unofficial)
  List
  – Nacogdoches, Texas
  on January 4
  – Palestine, Texas
  on January 4
  – Wilmot-Lake Chicot, Arkansas
  on January 6
  – Wynona, Oklahoma
  on March 22
  – Chanpion, Texas
  on May 15
  – Bowie, Texas
  on May 18
  – Sanger, Texas
  on May 18
  – Enosdale, Kansas
  on May 23
  – Washington-Emmons, Kanas
  on May 23
  –Granger, Texas
  on May 24
  – Cullison, Kansas
  on May 29
  – Windsor, Ontario
  on June 17
  – Mankato, Minnesota
  on August 17
  – Wells, Minnesota
  on August 17
  – Kłodzko, Poland (Note: Estimated F2-F4 intensity by the European Severe Storms Laboratory due to a minimal amount of information to provide a rating.)
  on August 20
  – Stronie Śląskie-Stójków, Poland (Note: Rated F3/F4 on an academically peer reviewed paper released in 2017.)
  on August 20
- Tornadoes in U.S.: 164 (Note: Totals are from L. H. Seamon, who worked for the U.S. Weather Bureau and wrote an academically peer reviewed paper in Monthly Weather Review combined with total from tornado expert Thomas P. Grazulis.)
- Damage (U.S.): ~$12,657,650 (U.S. Weather Bureau)
- Fatalities (U.S.): 77 (U.S. Weather Bureau)
- Fatalities (worldwide): 79

This page documents the tornadoes and tornado outbreaks of 1946, primarily in the United States. Most recorded tornadoes form in the U.S., although some events may take place internationally. Tornado statistics for older years like this often appear significantly lower than modern years due to fewer reports or confirmed tornadoes.

All documented significant tornadoes prior to 1950 in the United States were given unofficial ratings by tornado experts like Thomas P. Grazulis, which this article uses for the ratings below. Most of these records are limited to significant tornadoes; those rated F2 or higher on the Fujita scale, or which caused a fatality. Some listed events were tornado families rather than single tornadoes. There are also no official tornado counts for each month, but every month had tornadoes and are thus included in this article. In subsequent years, the documentation of tornadoes became much more widespread and efficient, with the average annual tornado count being around 1,253. Outside the United States, various meteorological organizations, like the European Severe Storms Laboratory rated tornadoes, which are considered official ratings.

== Events ==
=== United States yearly total ===
Confirmed tornadoes by Fujita rating
FU	F0	F1	F2	F3	F4	F5	Total
≥83	≥?	≥1	≥49	≥17	≥14	≥0	≥164

(Note: Totals are from L. H. Seamon, who worked for the U.S. Weather Bureau and wrote an academically peer reviewed paper in Monthly Weather Review combined with total from tornado expert Thomas P. Grazulis. Grazulis rated significant tornadoes (F2+ or a fatality). So, any tornado with a rating was done by Grazulis and any tornado rated "FU" was not rated by Grazulis.)

== January ==
=== January 4–6 ===
FU	F0	F1	F2	F3	F4	F5
1	0	0	3	3	3	0

The first day of a small but violent three-day tornado outbreak occurred in Texas, which killed 47 people and injuring at least 412 others. L. H. Seamon with the U.S. Weather Bureau, the predecessor of the National Weather Service, later stated this was the "most disastrous" tornado event of the year and the U.S. Weather Bureau also later stated in 1960 that January 4 had “outstanding tornadoes”. In Texas, a narrow F2 tornado passed near Decatur, derailing three train cars and causing injuries. Another tornado destroyed a farmhouse, resulting in additional injuries. Later that day, a powerful F3 tornado struck Clawson, destroying 30 homes and claiming three lives. The same storm system produced a devastating F4 tornado in Nacogdoches, where 80 homes were destroyed, 150 others damaged, and six fatalities occurred. The tornado continued into Appleby, causing further destruction and claiming three more lives. Near Peniel, a brief F2 tornado impacted over 100 buildings and injured 17 people. Simultaneously, an F4 tornado hit Anderson County, resulting in two fatalities and extensive damage. The tornado then struck the Southview community in Palestine, causing 13 deaths and numerous injuries. Minutes later, an F2 tornado struck the St. Paul—Shiloh area, destroying nine homes and claiming two lives. On January 5, a tornado caused minor property damage near Waynesboro. On January 6, an F4 tornado devastated Ashley and Chicot Counties in Arkansas, leveling homes and plantations, causing three deaths, and injuring 50 individuals. Additionally, two intense F3 tornadoes struck in Mississippi, resulting in multiple fatalities and injuries.

=== January 8 ===
An F2 tornado struck near Port Arthur, Texas, where several homes and several small buildings were destroyed by the tornado, which had a path length of 2 miles (3.2 km). At least two homes were unroofed.

== February ==
=== February 4 (United Kingdom) ===
FU	F0	F1	F2	F3	F4	F5
0	0	0	1	0	0	0

A tornado, rated F2/T4 by the European Severe Storms Laboratory struck Birmingham, England. It was noted that a damage survey was conducted by a “severe weather expert” with no further information given.

=== February 13 ===
FU	F0	F1	F2	F3	F4	F5
0	0	0	1	1	0	0

Early on February 13, an F3 tornado struck the eastern portion of Ardmore, in Oklahoma. The tornado killed one person, injured 15 others, destroyed 50 homes and damaged 1,700 other structures along a path of 4 miles (6.4 km). The damage was estimated up to $1.5 million (1946 USD). Later in the day, an F2 tornado struck a rural community east of Cedartown, Georgia. The tornado destroyed eight homes and unroofed five other homes, along its path of 4 miles (6.4 km) with a maximum width of 50 yards (46 m).

=== February 27 ===
FU	F0	F1	F2	F3	F4	F5
0	0	0	2	0	0	0

One February 27, an F2 tornado injured three people as it struck Terrace Park, a neighborhood in Tampa, Florida, where one home was destroyed, and a nearby home was unroofed. An hour after the Terrace Park F2, a second brief F2 unroofed a large home southeast of Lakeland, Florida, as it traveled along a short path of 0.5 miles (0.80 km) with a width of 100 yards (91 m).

== March ==
=== March 15 ===
An F2 tornado struck near Kewanee, in Mississippi, where it injured one person and destroyed a small home, a church, and multiple barns.

=== March 22 ===
FU	F0	F1	F2	F3	F4	F5
0	0	0	0	0	1	0

A large and violent F4 tornado struck less than 0.5 miles (0.80 km) away from Wynona in Oklahoma. The tornado destroyed a power plant, 15 homes, and damaged ten other homes as it travelled along a short path of 3 miles (4.8 km) with a width of 800 yards (730 m). A 500 pounds (230 kg) piece of machinery was carried for 0.5 miles (0.80 km) by the tornado. Damage was estimated at $150,000 (1946 USD).

== April ==
=== April 5 ===
An F2 tornado occurred near the city of Ottawa in Kansas, which destroyed a large barn and a smaller barn on two separate farms, along a path of 6 miles (9.7 km).

=== April 21 ===
A tornado struck the city of Timber Lake in South Dakota, causing $150,000 (1946 USD) in property damage along a path of 6 miles (9.7 km). This tornado did not receive an estimated rating on the Fujita scale from Thomas P. Grazulis, meaning it was believed to have been F0 or F1 intensity. In 1946 the U.S. Weather Bureau published a paper stating the tornado’s width to be 4 miles (6.4 km), which would make this the widest tornado ever documented.

== May ==
There were 35 tornadoes confirmed in the United States in the month of May. This was above the 1916–1945 average for the month of May.

=== May 10 ===
FU	F0	F1	F2	F3	F4	F5
0	0	0	1	1	0	0

An F2 tornado injured two people and destroyed two homes northwest of Queen City, Texas. Later in the day, an F3 tornado curved around Eufaula, Oklahoma, where it killed one person, injured five others and damaged or destroyed 18 homes.

=== May 15–20 ===
FU	F0	F1	F2	F3	F4	F5
0	0	0	3	2	3	0

A five day tornado outbreak sequence spawned multiple significant tornadoes. On May 15, an F2 tornado unroofed a home southwest of Briscoe, Texas. This same home would later be hit by a tornado in 1965. Later on the 15th, a deadly, violent F4 tornado struck the town of Loraine and the community of Champion. South of Loraine, two homes were destroyed. South of Champion, numerous homes were damaged, and three were leveled southeast of the community, where a woman was killed, and two injuries occurred. Over one hundred sheep and cattle were killed by the tornado. On May 16, an F2 tornado unroofed a large farmhouse and destroyed multiple smaller farmhouses near Sandy Ridge, Alabama. On May 17, a long-tracked and deadly F3 tornado impacted four counties in Illinois along its path of 27 miles (43 km). The tornado struck the edge of Norris City, where three homes were nearly leveled, and one fatality occurred. Outside of Norris City, the tornado damaged six homes and twelve barns.

On May 18, two violent and deadly F4 tornadoes struck Texas. The first tornado completely "splintered and scatted" a church in Stoneburg. In the church, a linen scarf was untouched by the tornado as it laid on the pulpit as the church was destroyed. Along the tornado’s 30 miles (48 km) path, multiple homes and barns were damaged or destroyed. At one of the destroyed homes, a man was killed by the tornado, and his wife was severely injured, though it is noted, she may have died from her injuries. Along the path, a "prominent elderly couple" was killed when their new ranch home was leveled along with all of their barns by the tornado northeast of Bowie, Texas. The second tornado struck around the city of Sanger. On the north side of the city, a home was leveled by the tornado, and three other homes were leveled four miles east of the city. On the east side of Sanger, a 9-year-old girl was killed by flying debris as she ran out of a storm cellar. It is noted by Grazulis that both F4 tornadoes are "related," indicating they may have been produced by the same supercell. On May 19, an F2 tornado destroyed a grocery store and unroofed four homes in Morgan City, Louisiana. On May 20, a deadly and long-tracked F3 tornado occurred in North Carolina. The tornado started near Seven Springs, passing near Kinston before ending its 25 miles (40 km) path near Grifton, North Carolina. In total, three homes and twelve barns were completely destroyed by the tornado, and at least 25 other homes were damaged. Near Kinston, two people were killed, and 50 other people were injured along the tornado's track.

=== May 16 (Spain) ===
FU	F0	F1	F2	F3	F4	F5
0	0	1	0	0	0	0

An F1 tornado impacted Port de Sóller, Spain injuring 100 people. The European Severe Storms Laboratory noted that the rating was based on a written account of the damage by Gayà, M.

=== May 23–24 ===
FU	F0	F1	F2	F3	F4	F5
2	0	0	7	5	3	0

A two-day significant tornado outbreak of at least 17 tornadoes resulted in four deaths and 42 injuries. On May 23, two F4 tornadoes struck communities in Washington County, Kansas. The first F4 tornado struck near the community of Enosdale, where two farm houses were completely swept away, with a woman being killed in one of the farmhouses. The second F4 tornado touched down roughly an hour after the first one and traveled an almost parallel path, where it completely leveled a farmhouse, damaged five other farmhouses, and injured two people near the community of Emmons. An F3 tornado injured two people as it crossed the Kansas-Nebraska state line near Liberty, Nebraska. An F3 tornado struck Holmes Park, Kansas City, Missouri, which killed two people and injured five others. A long-tracked F3 tornado tracked 60 miles (97 km) across Wisconsin, injuring two people. This was noted to have potentially have been a tornado family. An F4 tornado struck near Granger, Texas, where multiple homes "literally vanished" and one person was killed.

== June ==
=== June 1 (Netherlands) ===
An unrated tornado struck the city of Capelle aan den IJssel in the Netherlands.

=== June 13 (Europe) ===
FU	F0	F1	F2	F3	F4	F5
1	0	1	2	0	0	0

A deadly 500 metres (550 yd) wide F1 tornado impacted Zabrzeg, Poland, killing one person as the tornado destroyed roofs in the village and knocked down a “sizeable” part of the forest. On the same day, two significant tornadoes impacted portions of the Czech Republic. The first F2 tornado struck the villages of Stínava, Vícov, and Ptení. The second F2 tornado struck the village of Čejkovice. On the same day, an unrated tornado struck Graz, Austria.

=== June 16 (Romania) ===
FU	F0	F1	F2	F3	F4	F5
0	0	0	1	0	0	0

A tornado, rated F2 by the European Severe Storms Laboratory (ESSL), struck Bucuresti, Romania. It was noted that the rating was assigned based on a written account of the damage, though no damage was listed by the ESSL.

=== June 17 (United States and Canada) ===
FU	F0	F1	F2	F3	F4	F5
0	0	0	0	0	1	0

A large F4 tornado touched down in River Rouge, Michigan before crossing the Detroit River into Windsor, Ontario, where it caused most of the damage and fatalities before moving into the small town of Tecumseh and dissipating. 17 people were killed, and the tornado holds the record for the strongest tornado to hit Windsor. While the damage in the United States never received a rating on the Fujita scale, Thomas P. Grazulis rated the damage in the United States F3 on the Fujita scale and noted $1 million (1946 USD) in damage occurred on the United States side of this tornado. The exact death toll of this tornado is debated, with some sources saying 15 and others, specifically local newspapers, saying 18.

== August ==
=== August 17 ===
Two F4 tornadoes occurred in Minnesota.

=== August 20 (Poland) ===
FU	F0	F1	F2	F3	F4	F5
0	0	0	0	1	1	0

A large tornado struck Kłodzko, Poland, with an estimated intensity of F2–F4 on the Fujita scale. The European Severe Storms Laboratory documented the path length of the tornado at 10 kilometres (6.2 mi) with a maximum width of 1,000 metres (1,100 yd) and noted, “to less information to” assign a solid rating for the tornado. A few hours later, a large, deadly tornado, rated F3 by the European Severe Storms Laboratory, struck Stronie Śląskie and Stójków in Poland, killing one person and leaving ten missing. The European Severe Storms Laboratory documented the path length of the tornado at 20 kilometres (12 mi) with an average width of 1,000 metres (1,100 yd). It was also noted that this tornado completely destroyed three villages and left an noticeable scar through a forest. The European Severe Storms Laboratory also noted this may have been the same tornado as the one that struck Kłodzko. In an academically peer reviewed paper published in 2017, the tornado was rated F3/F4.

=== August 28 (Spain) ===
FU	F0	F1	F2	F3	F4	F5
0	0	0	1	0	0	0

A tornado, rated F2 by the European Severe Storms Laboratory (ESSL), struck Caravaca de la Cruz, Spain. It was noted that the rating was assigned based on a written account of the damage, though no damage was listed by the ESSL except that the tornado had a path length of 2 kilometres (1.2 mi).

== September ==
=== September 20 (United Kingdom) ===
FU	F0	F1	F2	F3	F4	F5
0	0	1	0	0	0	0

A tornado, rated F1/T3 by the European Severe Storms Laboratory struck Colyford, England. It was noted that a damage survey was conducted by a “severe weather expert” with no further information given.

== November ==
=== November 10 ===
An F2 tornado touched down in Mobile and Washington counties in Alabama, resulting in three homes being destroyed and causing four injuries.

== December ==
=== December 28–29 ===
FU	F0	F1	F2	F3	F4	F5
0	0	0	3	0	0	0

Three F2 tornadoes touched down in Arkansas and Kentucky, injuring 29 people and causing damage to buildings, some of which were destroyed.

== See also ==
- Weather of 1946
