= Tornado outbreak of January 4–6, 1946 =

Tornado outbreak

Meteorological history
- Duration: January 4–6, 1946

Tornado outbreak
- Tornadoes: ≥10
- Max. rating: F4 tornado
- Duration: 52 hours
- Highest winds: 207–260 mph (333–418 km/h)

Overall effects
- Fatalities: 47
- Injuries: 412+
- Damage: >$3.1 million (1946 USD)
- Areas affected: South—Central United States
- Part of the tornado outbreaks of 1946

On January 4–6, 1946, a small but violent tornado outbreak struck the South-Central United States, killing 47 people and injuring at least 412 others. L. H. Seamon with the US Weather Bureau, the predecessor of the National Weather Service, later stated it was the "most disastrous" tornado event of the year; the US Weather Bureau stated in 1960 that January 4, 1946 had "outstanding tornadoes".

== Confirmed tornadoes ==
All ratings on the Fujita scale were done by Thomas P. Grazulis, a tornado expert, and are classified as unofficial ratings as official ratings for tornadoes began in 1950. Grazulis only documented significant tornadoes (F2+), so the true number of tornadoes for this outbreak is likely higher.

Confirmed tornadoes by Fujita rating
FU	F0	F1	F2	F3	F4	F5	Total
≥ 1	≥ 0	≥ 0	3	3	3	0	≥10

=== January 4 event ===
List of confirmed tornadoes – Friday, January 4, 1946 (Note: All dates and times are based on the local time zone where the tornado touched down.)
F#	Location	County / Parish	State	Time (local)	Path length	Max width
F2	S of Decatur	Wise	TX	14:00	5 mi (8.0 km)	70 to 300 yd (64 to 274 m)
F2	The last three cars of a freight train were derailed, injuring five workers in the caboose. Two people were injured in a nearby farmhouse that was "torn apart" by the tornado. According to the US Weather Bureau it was 300 yards (270 m) wide, caused eight injuries and destroyed two farmhouses, while Thomas P. Grazulis documents a width of 70 yards (64 m) with seven injuries and one farmhouse destroyed.					
F3	Clawson	Angelina	TX	20:30	10 mi (16 km)	800 to 880 yd (730 to 800 m)
F3	3 deaths – The tornado moved northeastward through the community of Clawson, where it destroyed 30 homes, killing three people in two separate homes. Along the tornado's path, it destroyed 48 buildings and damaged another 327. The tornado injured 50 people and caused $500,000 in damage ($7.5 million in 2022).					
F4	Nacogdoches to Appleby	Nacogdoches	TX	20:45–21:30?	20 mi (32 km)	800 to 880 yd (730 to 800 m)
F4	10 deaths – The tornado occurred 7 miles (11 km) from the previous one, both produced by the same supercell. It caused extensive damage in the city of Nacogdoches, where 80 homes were completely destroyed and 150 more were damaged. Throughout the city, 75 people were injured, and, on the west side of Nacogdoches, six were killed. The tornado also struck the city of Appleby, where 300 buildings were damaged or destroyed, thousands of acres of forestry were flattened, and three killed. Overall, the tornado caused ten fatalities, injured 200, and resulted in $1,500,000 in damages (equivalent to $22.5 million in 2022). Texas A&M University states that this tornado was the same tornado as above, which increased the tornado’s death toll to 13 and damage total to $2.1 million ($31.5 million in 2022).					
F2	Peniel	Hunt	TX	21:00	2 mi (3.2 km)	200 yd (180 m)
F2	In Peniel, known today as Greenville, 11 homes were destroyed and 8 more were damaged; 102 other buildings were damaged or destroyed. In total, 17 people were injured.					
F4	Log Lake to Southview to Palestine	Anderson	TX	21:00	18 mi (29 km)	400 to 440 yd (370 to 400 m)
F4	15 deaths – The tornado touched down 10 miles (16 km) southwest of Palestine moving northeastward. Two people were killed near Log Lake. In the Southview community, the tornado destroyed 36 homes and damaged another 122 structures. Thirteen deaths occurred in seven of the destroyed homes in Southview. Cars were thrown several hundred yards throughout Southview. In total, the tornado killed 15 people and injured at least 60 others. The National Weather Service in Amarillo, Texas, lists this tornado as one of the worst tornadoes in the history of the state. One surviving resident recalls the sound as a "freight train like roar". The damage total for this tornado was $500,000 ($7.5 million in 2022).					
F2	St. Paul to Shiloh	Limestone	TX	21:30	5 mi (8.0 km)	>0 yd (0 m)
F2	8 deaths – Nine homes were destroyed, leading to two deaths in two separate homes. Other property damage also occurred. The tornado injured at least 17 people. The Madera Tribune reports this tornado killed "five or six negros...when the storm struck and demolished a gymnasium while a basketball game was in progress". Neither Grazulis nor the US Weather Bureau report deaths at the gymnasium.					

=== January 5 event ===
List of confirmed tornadoes – Saturday, January 5, 1946
F#	Location	County / Parish	State	Time (local)	Path length	Max width
FU	Waynesboro	Wayne	MS	Unknown	>0 mi (0 km)	>0 yd (0 m)
FU	A tornado struck around Waynesboro, causing mostly roof and tree damage. This tornado did not receive an estimated rating on the Fujita scale from Grazulis, meaning he believes it was F0 or F1 intensity.					

=== January 6 event ===
List of confirmed tornadoes – Sunday, January 6, 1946
F#	Location	County / Parish	State	Time (local)	Path length	Max width
F4	SE of Wilmot to Lake Chicot to SE of Lake Village	Ashley, Chicot	AR	18:00	4 to 5 mi (6.4 to 8.0 km) or 23 mi (37 km)	800 to 880 yd (730 to 800 m)
F4	3 deaths – The large tornado leveled multiple homes of all sizes along its path, including over 20 homes on two plantations near Wilmot, with 3 more homes swept away into Lake Chicot. The US Weather Bureau describes it as a "small tornado", with a path length of 4–5 miles, while stating that about 45 buildings were demolished and that 50 other buildings were damaged. Both the US Weather Bureau and Grazulis state the tornado killed three people and injured 50 others.					
F3	ENE of Seven Pines to near Coila to SE of Carrollton	Carroll	MS	18:00	13 mi (21 km)	>0 yd (0 m)
F3	4 deaths – A dozen small homes were destroyed, with four deaths occurring in three of the destroyed homes. The US Weather Bureau reports that when the tornado went through Seven Pines "it destroyed nearly every building.". Grazulis notes that there were conflicts about when this tornado occurred, meaning there were potentially two separate tornadoes. The US Weather Bureau records two people dead and five injured, while Grazulis states four dead and ten injured.					
F3	NW of Indianola to NW of Sunflower to E of Doddsville	Sunflower	MS	18:00	20 mi (32 km)	>0 yd (0 m)
F3	4 deaths – Two people were killed when a church was destroyed north of Indianola, another when a nearby home was obliterated, and the fourth in a small home northwest of Sunflower.					

== See also ==
- Tornadoes of 1946
- List of United States tornadoes in 1946
- List of F4 and EF4 tornadoes
