= Wynona Public Schools =

School district in Oklahoma

Wynona Public Schools is a school district headquartered in Wynona, Oklahoma. It includes an elementary school and a high school.

The district, in the Osage Nation, has 110 square miles (280 km^{2}) of area. The majority of that space is used for rural agricultural usage.

== History ==
In 1938, President of the United States Franklin Delano Roosevelt sent $24,800 in funds from the federal government to the Wynona district so it could build a new school facility.

A high school facility opened in the 1970s.

In 1991 the district had 129 students; at the time, H. M. Garrett became superintendent. In 2002 the enrollment was up to 210, with 58 students in high school.

In 2023, Dana Francis became the superintendent.
