= 1946 Windsor–Tecumseh tornado =

1946 tornado in Michigan, US and Ontario, Canada

Coordinates: 42.2900°N 82.9866°W

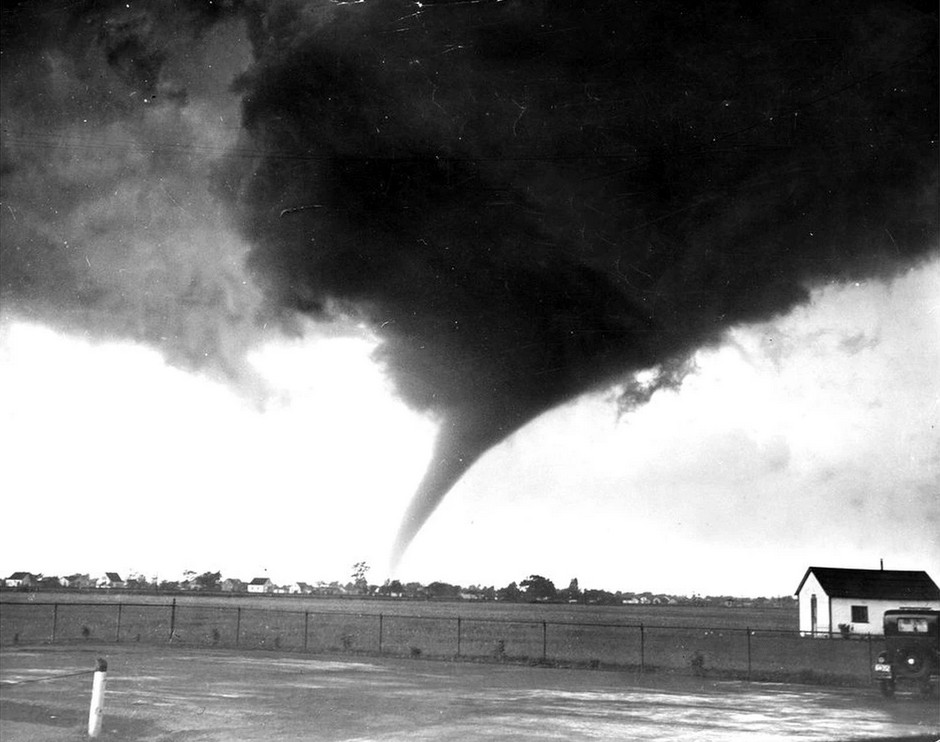
- The Windsor tornado, taken at Windsor Airport.

Meteorological history
- Formed: June 17, 1946 around 6:00 PM. EDT (22:00 UTC)

F4 tornado
- on the Fujita scale
- Highest gusts: Official: Over 165mph Unofficial: ~250mph

Overall effects
- Fatalities: 17
- Damage: $9.663 million ($169 million in 2025 dollars)
- Areas affected: Windsor, Ontario, La Salle, Ontario, Tecumseh, Ontario and surrounding areas
- Part of the tornado outbreaks of 1946

On June 17, 1946, a deadly and powerful tornado moved through the city of Windsor, Ontario, killing 17 people. The tornado was the most powerful tornado to strike Windsor, when it was at F4 intensity. The tornado touched down near River Rouge, Michigan, then crossed the Detroit River and made landfall in the Brighton Beach neighbourhood of Windsor. It then cut across southern Windsor and northern Sandwich West Township, Ontario (now the Municipality of LaSalle, Ontario), along a path 60 kilometres (40 mi) in length. It also cut across Highway 3 before weakening somewhat. The storm then touched down as an F4 again at the modern-day intersection of Walker Road and Grand Marais Road, near the center of the city.

== Tornado summary ==
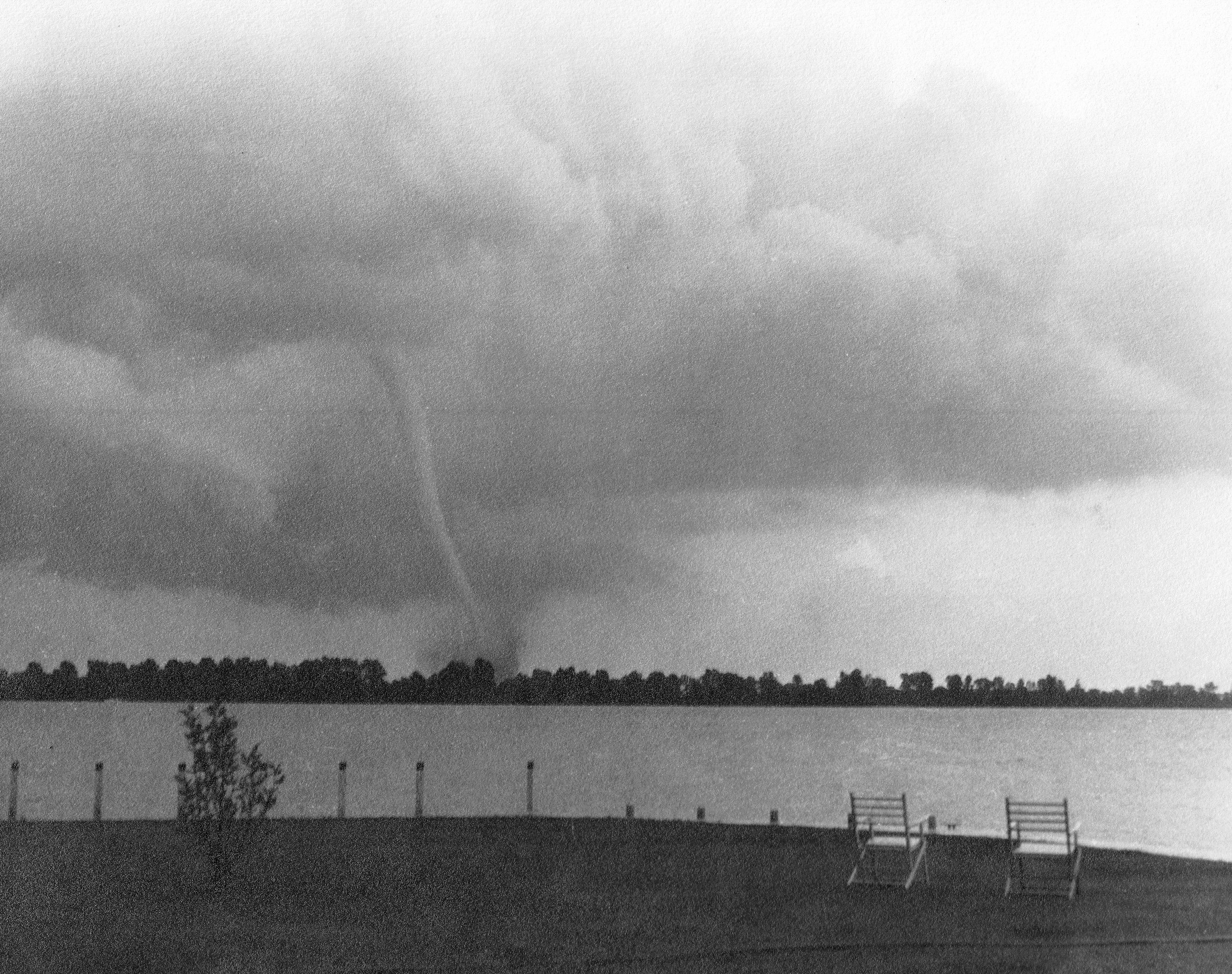
Windsor–Tecumseh tornado viewed from Garland's Seaplane Base on the Detroit side of the Detroit River looking towards Peche Island (photo by Harry G. Garland).

The tornado took a northeastward path. It cut through a partially undeveloped area with few housing subdivisions and narrowly missed Windsor Airport, which was located just south of the tornado route. It then traveled through the northwest part of Tecumseh, Ontario, then dissipated over Lake St. Clair.

The storm's path was approximately 30 metres (100 ft) wide, and followed Turkey Creek for much of its length after crossing the Detroit River, and travelled 60 km. The storm's damage ranged from F3–F4, to some F5 damage from completely destroyed houses that were lifted off their foundations. The tornado is considered the third deadliest in Canadian history and the deadliest ever recorded in Ontario. Beyond the 400 homes damaged or destroyed, orchards were uprooted, 15 farm buildings were destroyed, and railroad boxcars were thrown from their tracks and flipped onto their sides. One account documented by the Western University Northern Tornadoes Project archive states that an airplane was picked up by the tornado in Detroit and came down on a house in Windsor, killing the residents inside. Environment Canada later investigated the tornado as a candidate for an F5 rating upgrade due to the extreme nature of some damage indicators, but the upgrade was not granted due to insufficient evidence. The tornado's winds were estimated by researchers at between 270 and 310 km/h, placing it at the upper end of the F4 range.

Since the tornado had cut power to the main printing offices of the Windsor Star, the Detroit News assisted by offering their printing facilities.

The tornado knocked out power to most of the city for about a day, and damaged or destroyed roughly 400 homes in Windsor.

== Radio reports ==
Although CKLW broadcast to the areas affected by the tornado, there are no recordings of this incident in their archives. CBC Toronto is the only radio station that has kept reports of the tornado in its archives. The CBC Archives contain records of damages and deaths incurred, reported looting, and accounts from eyewitnesses.

== Aftermath ==
After the tornado, civility and order were quickly restored by the police. Many accounts of the tornado were told over the radio (notably, CKLW, which was Windsor's CBC radio affiliate at the time), and the Ontario Provincial Government even explained the conditions that are favourable for tornado development, to alleviate the public's fears of an "epidemic of tornadoes", especially since one week later, a tornado struck the towns of Fort Frances and International Falls.

== See also ==
- Tornadoes of 1946
  - List of United States tornadoes in 1946
- List of tornadoes and tornado outbreaks
- List of North American tornadoes and tornado outbreaks
  - List of F4 and EF4 tornadoes
- List of Canadian tornadoes
- List of tornadoes striking downtown areas
