= Woodville, Porter County, Indiana =

Woodville
- Unincorporated community
- Location within Indiana Location within the United States
- Coordinates: 41°33′46″N 87°02′29″W
- Country: United States
- State: Indiana
- County: Porter
- Township: Liberty
- Platted/Incorporated: 1880
- Elevation: 715 ft (218 m)
- Time zone: UTC-6 (Central (CST))
  - Summer (DST): UTC-5 (CDT)
- ZIP code: 46304
- Area code: 219
- GNIS feature ID: 446320

Woodville is an unincorporated community in Liberty Township, Porter County, in the U.S. state of Indiana.

== History ==
In 1880, the village of Woodville was platted by John C. Cole and incorporated. It remained incorporated into the 20th century. The community had its start when the railroad was extended to that point. A post office was established at Woodville in 1882, and remained in operation until 1914.

A general store was established in Woodville that served as the passenger and freight depot for the B&O Railroad. Large quantities of milk, eggs, and other agricultural products were shipped from here to Chicago. The building remained standing until 2006 when it was razed. For a period of time from the 1920s until early in the 1940s Woodville boasted of two general stores, one on either side of the railway, serving a large portion of the rural countryside in a three-mile radius.

On May 24, 1946, a very intense tornado struck the community, where it obliterated two homes, three barns, and a gas station. The tornado was estimated to have been F3 on the Fujita scale by tornado expert Thomas P. Grazulis and was noting to have caused “near-F4 damage” in the community.
