= Froid, Montana =

- Town
- Motto: "Last Best Place"
- Location of Froid, Montana
- Coordinates: 48°20′17″N 104°29′27″W
- Country: United States
- State: Montana
- County: Roosevelt

Area
  - Total: 0.63 sq mi (1.62 km^{2})
  - Land: 0.63 sq mi (1.62 km^{2})
  - Water: 0 sq mi (0.00 km^{2})
- Elevation: 2,041 ft (622 m)

Population (2020)
  - Total: 195
  - Density: 312.7/sq mi (120.74/km^{2})
- Time zone: UTC-7 (Mountain (MST))
  - Summer (DST): UTC-6 (MDT)
- ZIP code: 59226
- Area code: 406
- FIPS code: 30-29500
- GNIS feature ID: 2412662

Froid is a town in Roosevelt County, Montana, United States. The population was 195 at the 2020 census. Froid was named for the French word for "cold".

== History ==
Froid was incorporated in 1910. The town made headlines in 2007, when Governor Brian Schweitzer gave the commencement address to the high school graduating class, which consisted entirely of one student, Roxie Britton. The act received considerable soft news coverage for this distinction.

== Geography ==
Froid is located near the North Dakota border and north of Culbertson, on Highway 16.

According to the United States Census Bureau, the town has a total area of 0.28 square miles (0.73 km^{2}), all land.

== Demographics ==
Historical population
Census	Pop.	Note	%±
1920	410		—
1930	434		5.9%
1940	441		1.6%
1950	555		25.9%
1960	418		−24.7%
1970	330		−21.1%
1980	323		−2.1%
1990	195		−39.6%
2000	195		0.0%
2010	185		−5.1%
2020	195		5.4%
U.S. Decennial Census

=== 2010 census ===
As of the census of 2010, there were 185 people, 92 households, and 49 families residing in the town. The population density was 660.7 inhabitants per square mile (255.1/km^{2}). There were 117 housing units at an average density of 417.9 per square mile (161.4/km^{2}). The racial makeup of the town was 97.3% White, 0.5% Native American, and 2.2% from two or more races.

There were 92 households, of which 21.7% had children under the age of 18 living with them, 46.7% were married couples living together, 5.4% had a female householder with no husband present, 1.1% had a male householder with no wife present, and 46.7% were non-families. 43.5% of all households were made up of individuals, and 21.8% had someone living alone who was 65 years of age or older. The average household size was 2.01 and the average family size was 2.84.

The median age in the town was 50.9 years. 23.2% of residents were under the age of 18; 1.7% were between the ages of 18 and 24; 16.2% were from 25 to 44; 31.3% were from 45 to 64; and 27.6% were 65 years of age or older. The gender makeup of the town was 45.4% male and 54.6% female.

=== 2000 census ===
As of the census of 2000, there were 195 people, 97 households, and 51 families residing in the town. The population density was 688.1 inhabitants per square mile (265.7/km^{2}). There were 122 housing units at an average density of 430.5 per square mile (166.2/km^{2}). The racial makeup of the town was 90.77% White, 5.64% Native American, 1.54% from other races, and 2.05% from two or more races. Hispanic or Latino of any race were 1.54% of the population.

There were 97 households, out of which 20.6% had children under the age of 18 living with them, 41.2% were married couples living together, 4.1% had a female householder with no husband present, and 47.4% were non-families. 45.4% of all households were made up of individuals, and 29.9% had someone living alone who was 65 years of age or older. The average household size was 2.01 and the average family size was 2.88.

In the town, the population was spread out, with 24.6% under the age of 18, 2.1% from 18 to 24, 21.5% from 25 to 44, 24.1% from 45 to 64, and 27.7% who were 65 years of age or older. The median age was 48 years. For every 100 females there were 114.3 males. For every 100 females age 18 and over, there were 96.0 males.

The median income for a household in the town was $24,583, and the median income for a family was $31,250. Males had a median income of $21,111 versus $16,875 for females. The per capita income for the town was $15,021. About 11.8% of families and 7.6% of the population were below the poverty line, including 2.0% of those under the age of eighteen and 7.1% of those 65 or over.

== Education ==
Froid Public Schools serves students from kindergarten through 12th grade. Froid High School's team name is the Red Hawks.

Roosevelt County Library, headquartered in Wolf Point, has a branch location in Froid.

The international bestseller The Paris Library, a novel written by Montanan author Janet Skeslien Charles is set in Froid. The novel Jake Miller's Wheel by author Jim Ostby is also set in Froid.
