= Stójków =

- Village
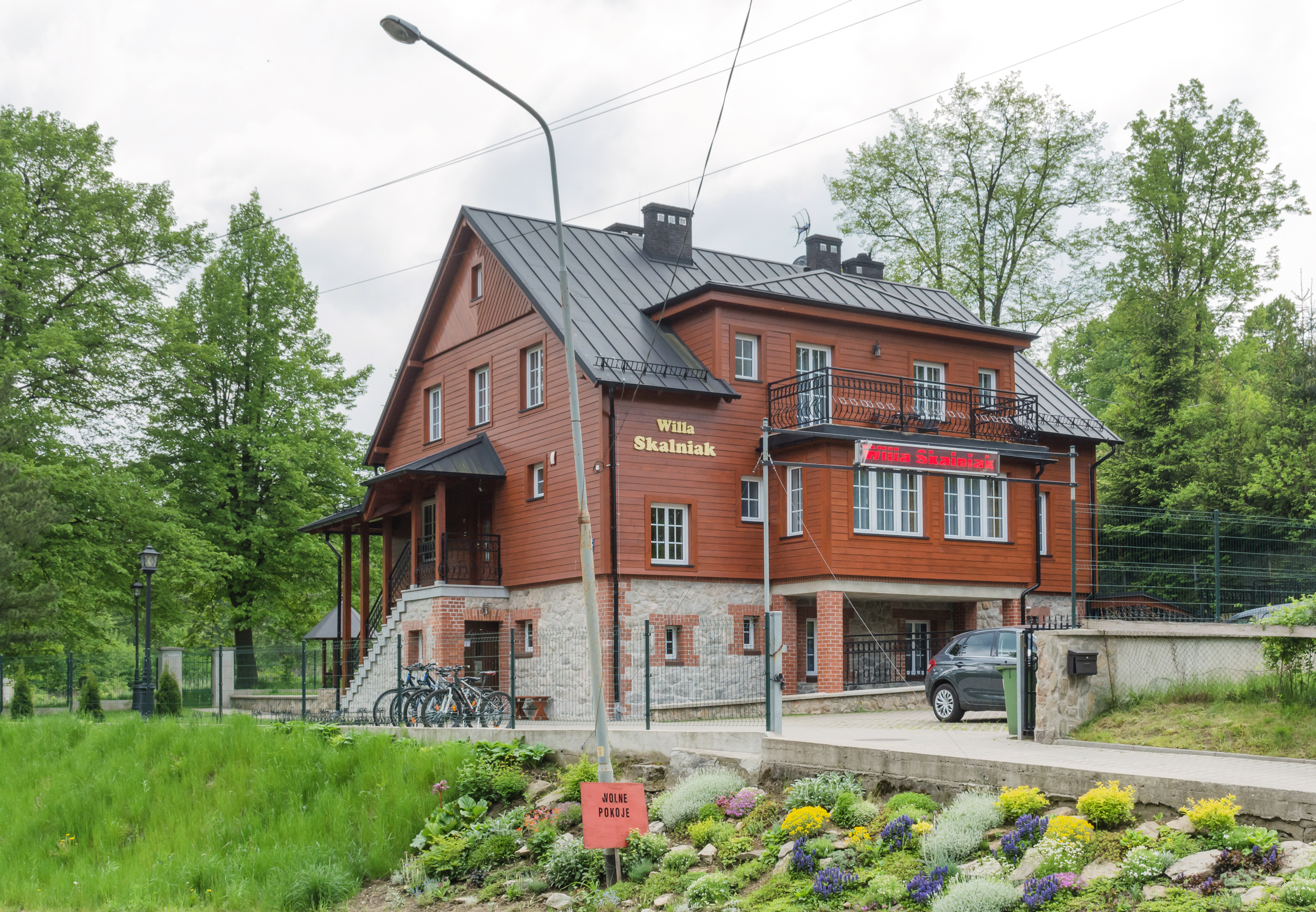
- Skalniak Villa

- Location within Poland
- Coordinates: 50°19′N 16°53′E
- Country: Poland
- Voivodeship: Lower Silesian
- County: Kłodzko
- Gmina: Lądek-Zdrój

Population
  - Total: 199

Stójków [ˈstui̯kuf] is a village in the administrative district of Gmina Lądek-Zdrój, within Kłodzko County, Lower Silesian Voivodeship, in south-western Poland.

On 20 August 1946, the village was destroyed by an extremely intense tornado. The European Severe Storms Laboratory officially rated the tornado F3 on the Fujita scale, however, an academically peer-reviewed, published paper in 2017 rated the tornado F3/F4.
