= Monrovia, Kansas =

Unincorporated community in Kansas, U.S.

Monrovia is an unincorporated community in Atchison County, Kansas, United States. Monrovia is located at 39°31′27″N 95°20′46″W.

== History ==
Monrovia was platted in 1856, making it one of the oldest towns in Atchison County. The community on the Missouri Pacific Railroad never did grow large enough to meet its founders' expectations.

A post office was opened in Monrovia in 1857, and remained in operation until it was discontinued in 1955.
