= Bogard, Missouri =

- City
- Flag

- Location of Bogard, Missouri
- Coordinates: 39°27′29″N 93°31′26″W
- Country: United States
- State: Missouri
- County: Carroll
- Incorporated: 1961

Area
  - Total: 0.54 sq mi (1.41 km^{2})
  - Land: 0.54 sq mi (1.41 km^{2})
  - Water: 0 sq mi (0.00 km^{2})
- Elevation: 866 ft (264 m)

Population (2020)
  - Total: 167
  - Density: 306.1/sq mi (118.17/km^{2})
- Time zone: UTC-6 (Central (CST))
  - Summer (DST): UTC-5 (CDT)
- ZIP code: 64622
- Area code: 660
- FIPS code: 29-06832
- GNIS feature ID: 2394213

Bogard is a city in Carroll County, Missouri, United States. The population was 167 at the 2020 census.

== History ==
Bogard was originally known as Bogard's Mound, after a tumulus near the site which a pioneer citizen named Bogard used as an observation tower. The village plat was made in 1884. A post office called Bogard Mound was established in 1872, and the name was changed to Bogard in 1884.

== Geography ==
According to the United States Census Bureau, the city has a total area of 0.55 square miles (1.42 km^{2}), all land.

== Demographics ==
Historical population
Census	Pop.	Note	%±
1890	300		—
1900	276		−8.0%
1910	316		14.5%
1920	381		20.6%
1930	329		−13.6%
1940	334		1.5%
1950	285		−14.7%
1960	277		−2.8%
1970	294		6.1%
1980	285		−3.1%
1990	228		−20.0%
2000	234		2.6%
2010	164		−29.9%
2020	167		1.8%
U.S. Decennial Census

=== 2010 census ===
As of the census of 2010, there were 164 people, 74 households, and 48 families living in the city. The population density was 298.2 inhabitants per square mile (115.1/km^{2}). There were 94 housing units at an average density of 170.9 per square mile (66.0/km^{2}). The racial makeup of the city was 100.0% White. Hispanic or Latino of any race were 3.7% of the population.

There were 74 households, of which 24.3% had children under the age of 18 living with them, 56.8% were married couples living together, 5.4% had a female householder with no husband present, 2.7% had a male householder with no wife present, and 35.1% were non-families. 28.4% of all households were made up of individuals, and 18.9% had someone living alone who was 65 years of age or older. The average household size was 2.22 and the average family size was 2.67.

The median age in the city was 45.5 years. 18.9% of residents were under the age of 18; 3.6% were between the ages of 18 and 24; 26.8% were from 25 to 44; 27.4% were from 45 to 64; and 23.2% were 65 years of age or older. The gender makeup of the city was 47.0% male and 53.0% female.

=== 2000 census ===
As of the census of 2000, there were 234 people, 98 households, and 68 families living in the city. The population density was 429.0 inhabitants per square mile (165.6/km^{2}). There were 116 housing units at an average density of 212.6 per square mile (82.1/km^{2}). The racial makeup of the city was 100.00% White. Hispanic or Latino of any race were 0.43% of the population.

There were 98 households, out of which 25.5% had children under the age of 18 living with them, 63.3% were married couples living together, 5.1% had a female householder with no husband present, and 30.6% were non-families. 27.6% of all households were made up of individuals, and 20.4% had someone living alone who was 65 years of age or older. The average household size was 2.39 and the average family size was 2.93.

In the city the population was spread out, with 24.8% under the age of 18, 4.7% from 18 to 24, 22.2% from 25 to 44, 27.4% from 45 to 64, and 20.9% who were 65 years of age or older. The median age was 41 years. For every 100 females, there were 107.1 males. For every 100 females age 18 and over, there were 97.8 males.

The median income for a household in the city was $22,639, and the median income for a family was $42,679. Males had a median income of $26,667 versus $16,458 for females. The per capita income for the city was $17,208. About 6.8% of families and 13.1% of the population were below the poverty line, including 22.9% of those under the age of eighteen and 12.7% of those 65 or over.

== Education ==
It is in the Carrollton R-VII School District.
