= Timber Lake, South Dakota =

Timber Lake Blečháŋ (Lakota)
- City
- Location in Dewey County and the state of South Dakota
- Coordinates: 45°25′46″N 101°04′17″W
- Country: United States
- State: South Dakota
- County: Dewey
- Incorporated: 1910

Area
  - Total: 0.61 sq mi (1.58 km^{2})
  - Land: 0.61 sq mi (1.58 km^{2})
  - Water: 0 sq mi (0.00 km^{2})
- Elevation: 2,165 ft (660 m)

Population (2020)
  - Total: 509
  - Density: 833.4/sq mi (321.78/km^{2})
- Time zone: UTC−7 (Mountain (MST))
  - Summer (DST): UTC−6 (MDT)
- ZIP code: 57656
- Area code: 605
- FIPS code: 46-63620
- GNIS feature ID: 1267600
- Website: www.timberlakesd.org

Timber Lake (Lakota: Blečháŋ; "Tree Lake") is a city in and the county seat of Dewey County, South Dakota, United States. The population was 509 at the 2020 census.

== History ==
Timber Lake was founded in 1910 with the arrival of the Chicago, Milwaukee, St. Paul and Pacific Railroad into the area. Despite the name, very few trees grew at the lake near the town site. During drought, the lake is a mere mudhole.

On April 21, 1946, a large tornado struck the area in and around Timber Lake. The U.S. Weather Bureau published a paper in 1946 stating the width of this tornado was 4 miles (6.4 km), which would make this the widest tornado ever documented in history, surpassing the 2013 El Reno tornado. However, this is outside the period of reliable documentation accepted by the National Weather Service; 1950–present.

== Geography and climate ==
According to the United States Census Bureau, the city has a total area of 0.41 square miles (1.06 km^{2}), all land.

Climate data for Timber Lake, South Dakota (1991−2020 normals, extremes 1911−present)
Month	Jan	Feb	Mar	Apr	May	Jun	Jul	Aug	Sep	Oct	Nov	Dec	Year
Record high °F (°C)	68 (20)	70 (21)	84 (29)	95 (35)	100 (38)	108 (42)	115 (46)	109 (43)	106 (41)	94 (34)	77 (25)	70 (21)	115 (46)
Mean daily maximum °F (°C)	26.7 (−2.9)	30.7 (−0.7)	43.9 (6.6)	57.7 (14.3)	69.1 (20.6)	78.7 (25.9)	85.9 (29.9)	85.1 (29.5)	76.1 (24.5)	58.7 (14.8)	42.6 (5.9)	30.2 (−1.0)	57.1 (13.9)
Daily mean °F (°C)	16.9 (−8.4)	20.7 (−6.3)	32.6 (0.3)	44.8 (7.1)	56.2 (13.4)	66.3 (19.1)	72.7 (22.6)	71.3 (21.8)	62.1 (16.7)	46.7 (8.2)	32.1 (0.1)	20.8 (−6.2)	45.3 (7.4)
Mean daily minimum °F (°C)	7.1 (−13.8)	10.8 (−11.8)	21.2 (−6.0)	31.9 (−0.1)	43.4 (6.3)	53.9 (12.2)	59.4 (15.2)	57.5 (14.2)	48.1 (8.9)	34.6 (1.4)	21.7 (−5.7)	11.3 (−11.5)	33.4 (0.8)
Record low °F (°C)	−46 (−43)	−37 (−38)	−26 (−32)	−3 (−19)	15 (−9)	31 (−1)	30 (−1)	31 (−1)	12 (−11)	−6 (−21)	−20 (−29)	−34 (−37)	−46 (−43)
Average precipitation inches (mm)	0.49 (12)	0.67 (17)	1.00 (25)	1.83 (46)	2.90 (74)	3.56 (90)	2.85 (72)	1.78 (45)	1.53 (39)	1.66 (42)	0.57 (14)	0.57 (14)	19.41 (493)
Average snowfall inches (cm)	6.4 (16)	7.5 (19)	6.5 (17)	5.2 (13)	0.6 (1.5)	0.0 (0.0)	0.0 (0.0)	0.0 (0.0)	0.0 (0.0)	2.3 (5.8)	4.4 (11)	8.3 (21)	41.2 (105)
Average precipitation days (≥ 0.01 in)	5.9	6.3	6.1	7.8	10.1	10.7	8.7	7.2	6.4	6.7	4.8	5.2	85.9
Average snowy days (≥ 0.1 in)	5.2	5.4	3.8	2.1	0.2	0.0	0.0	0.0	0.0	1.1	3.3	4.9	26.0
Source: NOAA

== Demographics ==
Historical population
Census	Pop.	Note	%±
1920	555		—
1930	572		3.1%
1940	512		−10.5%
1950	552		7.8%
1960	624		13.0%
1970	625		0.2%
1980	660		5.6%
1990	517		−21.7%
2000	443		−14.3%
2010	443		0.0%
2020	509		14.9%
U.S. Decennial Census

=== 2020 census ===
As of the 2020 census, Timber Lake had a population of 509. The median age was 31.2 years. 30.1% of residents were under the age of 18 and 14.3% of residents were 65 years of age or older. For every 100 females there were 95.0 males, and for every 100 females age 18 and over there were 94.5 males age 18 and over.

0.0% of residents lived in urban areas, while 100.0% lived in rural areas.

There were 203 households in Timber Lake, of which 44.3% had children under the age of 18 living in them. Of all households, 40.4% were married-couple households, 18.7% were households with a male householder and no spouse or partner present, and 28.6% were households with a female householder and no spouse or partner present. About 28.1% of all households were made up of individuals and 10.8% had someone living alone who was 65 years of age or older.

There were 219 housing units, of which 7.3% were vacant. The homeowner vacancy rate was 0.0% and the rental vacancy rate was 7.3%.

Racial composition as of the 2020 census
Race	Number	Percent
White	169	33.2%
Black or African American	0	0.0%
American Indian and Alaska Native	285	56.0%
Asian	0	0.0%
Native Hawaiian and Other Pacific Islander	0	0.0%
Some other race	4	0.8%
Two or more races	51	10.0%
Hispanic or Latino (of any race)	7	1.4%

=== 2010 census ===
As of the census of 2010, there were 443 people, 179 households, and 110 families residing in the city. The population density was 1,080.5 inhabitants per square mile (417.2/km^{2}). There were 208 housing units at an average density of 507.3 per square mile (195.9/km^{2}). The racial makeup of the city was 51.5% White, 43.1% Native American, and 5.4% from two or more races. Hispanic or Latino of any race were 0.05% of the population.

There were 179 households, of which 33.5% had children under the age of 18 living with them, 44.7% were married couples living together, 10.1% had a female householder with no husband present, 6.7% had a male householder with no wife present, and 38.5% were non-families. 34.6% of all households were made up of individuals, and 16.2% had someone living alone who was 65 years of age or older. The average household size was 2.47 and the average family size was 3.15.

The median age in the city was 34.5 years. 29.6% of residents were under the age of 18; 5.6% were between the ages of 18 and 24; 25.8% were from 25 to 44; 22.8% were from 45 to 64; and 16.3% were 65 years of age or older. The gender makeup of the city was 49.2% male and 50.8% female.

=== 2000 census ===
As of the census of 2000, there were 443 people, 183 households, and 120 families residing in the city. The population density was 1,086.8 inhabitants per square mile (419.6/km^{2}). There were 207 housing units at an average density of 507.8 per square mile (196.1/km^{2}). The racial makeup of the city was 60.72% White, 36.34% Native American, 1.13% Asian, and 1.81% from two or more races.

There were 183 households, out of which 29.0% had children under the age of 18 living with them, 50.8% were married couples living together, 9.8% had a female householder with no husband present, and 34.4% were non-families. 31.1% of all households were made up of individuals, and 18.0% had someone living alone who was 65 years of age or older. The average household size was 2.42 and the average family size was 3.03.

In the city, the population was spread out, with 28.2% under the age of 18, 9.0% from 18 to 24, 22.3% from 25 to 44, 21.7% from 45 to 64, and 18.7% who were 65 years of age or older. The median age was 37 years. For every 100 females, there were 93.4 males. For every 100 females age 18 and over, there were 91.6 males.

The median income for a household in the city was $27,500, and the median income for a family was $28,000. Males had a median income of $23,750 versus $20,625 for females. The per capita income for the city was $12,047. About 20.8% of families and 23.3% of the population were below the poverty line, including 26.8% of those under age 18 and 19.1% of those age 65 or over.

== Media ==
- The Timber Lake Topic is the local newspaper.

== Education ==
It is in the Timber Lake School District 20-3.

== Notable people ==
- Tucker Kraft, NFL tight end for the Green Bay Packers.

== See also ==
- List of cities in South Dakota
