= Wynona, Oklahoma =

Incorporated town in Osage County, Oklahoma

- Town
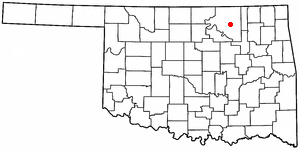
- Location of Wynona, Oklahoma
- Coordinates: 36°32′45″N 96°19′35″W
- Country: United States
- State: Oklahoma
- County: Osage

Area
  - Total: 0.55 sq mi (1.42 km^{2})
  - Land: 0.55 sq mi (1.42 km^{2})
  - Water: 0 sq mi (0.00 km^{2})
- Elevation: 902 ft (275 m)

Population (2020)
  - Total: 370
  - Density: 673.8/sq mi (260.16/km^{2})
- Time zone: UTC-6 (Central (CST))
  - Summer (DST): UTC-5 (CDT)
- ZIP code: 74084
- Area codes: 539/918
- FIPS code: 40-82450
- GNIS feature ID: 2413516

Wynona is an incorporated town in central Osage County, Oklahoma, United States. It was founded by a local Osage-Cherokee rancher, Antoine Rogers, in 1903. As of the 2020 census, the community had 370 residents.

== History ==
An Osage-Cherokee rancher, Antoine Rogers, settled in the area that would become the town of Wynona in 1871, after the Osage tribe had been removed from Kansas to Indian Territory by the U. S. Government. In 1903, the Missouri–Kansas–Texas Railroad (also known as the MK&T or Katy railroad) built a line across Rogers's land. A store was built adjacent to the track, and that event is considered the establishment of Wynona, which soon became a cattle shipping point.

The Osage Townsite Company began development of the town in 1909. By the end of the year, the population grew from 20 to more than 150 residents. The first local newspaper, a weekly named the Wynona Enterprise, appeared in August 1909. (Note: Eventually there would be five more periodicals in Wynona, including the Wynona Record and the Wynona Argosy.)

Oil was discovered near Wynona in 1914, and led to the creation of Wynona Oil and Gas Company. This caused an influx of new residents to support the local oil industry. Wynona's 1920 census reported 2,749 inhabitants. Wynona remained important for its agriculture and ranching business. Ranchers diversified into producing hogs, poultry and dairy products. However, the town failed to put in electric service and paved streets, causing some businessmen to move elsewhere. The end of the boom in Osage County oil production and the onset of the Great Depression caused the population to decline sharply to 1,171 in 1930 and to 652 in 1960. The MK&T abandoned its rail line in 1977.

On March 22, 1946, the town was struck by a violent tornado, estimated by tornado expert Thomas P. Grazulis to have been F4 intensity on the Fujita scale. The tornado destroyed a power plant, 15 homes, and damaged ten other homes as it travelled along a short path of 3 miles (4.8 km) with a width of 800 yards (730 m). A 500 pounds (230 kg) piece of machinery was carried for 0.5 miles (0.80 km) by the tornado. Damage was estimated at $150,000 (1946 USD).

== Geography ==
According to the United States Census Bureau, the town has a total area of 0.5 square miles (1.3 km^{2}), all land.

== Demographics ==
Historical population
Census	Pop.	Note	%±
1920	2,749		—
1930	1,171		−57.4%
1940	810		−30.8%
1950	678		−16.3%
1960	652		−3.8%
1970	547		−16.1%
1980	780		42.6%
1990	531		−31.9%
2000	531		0.0%
2010	437		−17.7%
2020	370		−15.3%
U.S. Decennial Census

=== 2020 census ===
As of the 2020 census, Wynona had a population of 370. The median age was 40.3 years. 25.4% of residents were under the age of 18 and 20.8% of residents were 65 years of age or older. For every 100 females there were 102.2 males, and for every 100 females age 18 and over there were 104.4 males age 18 and over.

0.0% of residents lived in urban areas, while 100.0% lived in rural areas.

There were 140 households in Wynona, of which 32.9% had children under the age of 18 living in them. Of all households, 44.3% were married-couple households, 21.4% were households with a male householder and no spouse or partner present, and 21.4% were households with a female householder and no spouse or partner present. About 25.7% of all households were made up of individuals and 14.3% had someone living alone who was 65 years of age or older.

There were 169 housing units, of which 17.2% were vacant. The homeowner vacancy rate was 3.3% and the rental vacancy rate was 3.7%.

Racial composition as of the 2020 census
Race	Number	Percent
White	266	71.9%
Black or African American	3	0.8%
American Indian and Alaska Native	52	14.1%
Asian	1	0.3%
Native Hawaiian and Other Pacific Islander	0	0.0%
Some other race	0	0.0%
Two or more races	48	13.0%
Hispanic or Latino (of any race)	9	2.4%

=== 2000 census ===
As of the census of 2000, there were 531 people, 221 households, and 150 families residing in the town. The population density was 982.5 inhabitants per square mile (379.3/km^{2}). There were 246 housing units at an average density of 455.2 per square mile (175.8/km^{2}). The racial makeup of the town was 76.65% White, 14.69% Native American, 0.56% from other races, and 8.10% from two or more races. Hispanic or Latino of any race were 2.82% of the population.

There were 221 households, out of which 29.4% had children under the age of 18 living with them, 52.9% were married couples living together, 10.4% had a female householder with no husband present, and 32.1% were non-families. 28.5% of all households were made up of individuals, and 12.7% had someone living alone who was 65 years of age or older. The average household size was 2.40 and the average family size was 2.96.

In the town, the population was spread out, with 25.0% under the age of 18, 8.9% from 18 to 24, 26.2% from 25 to 44, 25.6% from 45 to 64, and 14.3% who were 65 years of age or older. The median age was 36 years. For every 100 females, there were 105.8 males. For every 100 females age 18 and over, there were 98.0 males.

The median income for a household in the town was $24,917, and the median income for a family was $32,500. Males had a median income of $23,750 versus $16,932 for females. The per capita income for the town was $14,201. About 9.6% of families and 14.4% of the population were below the poverty line, including 25.7% of those under age 18 and 6.5% of those age 65 or over.

== Government ==
Wynona is governed by a town board.

== Education ==
It is in Wynona Public Schools.
