= Skipping tornado =

Tornado with discontinuous damage path

A skipping tornado is a process tornado (or a series of tornadoes) which has a discontinuous damage path.

There are several possible causes for this phenomenon:

1. The tornado actually lifting from the surface (which technically may make the two damage paths separate tornadoes)
2. The tornado passing over a portion of land where there are no structures or vegetation (i.e. damage indicators) capable of showing damage
3. The tornado temporarily weakening so that the winds are below the damage threshold of the structures or vegetation being affected.

Historically, skipping referred to the breaks in the damage path of what was considered as a single longer track tornado. With the discovery of cyclic tornadogenesis with some supercell thunderstorms, it was learned that successive tornadoes form with new mesocyclones and the resulting series of tornadoes is referred to as a tornado family. Especially when a tornado is first developing there may be small gaps in damage due to the circulation briefly ceasing at the surface or becoming too weak to cause damage even as the parent mesocyclone (and possibly a tornadic circulation aloft) is continuous and this is typically, but not always, considered a single tornado. In these cases, usually only tornadoes emanating from new mesocyclones (i.e. new tornadogenesis cycle and new wall cloud) are counted as a separate tornado. Before it was recognized that tornadoes can be multivortex, the phenomenon of subvortices also caused confusion both during a tornado and for surveying damage paths. Some forms of tornadoes, again especially in the process of formation prior to congealing their wind fields, may be multivortex tornadoes with dispersed subvortices with subdamaging wind in the intervening space within the larger circulation, which can give the appearance of skipping.

== See also ==
- Funnel cloud
- Tornado intensity and damage
- Satellite tornado
