= Holmes Park, Kansas City =

Neighborhood of Kansas City, Missouri

Coordinates: 38.9525065°N 94.5357878°W

Holmes Park is a neighborhood of Kansas City, Missouri, United States.

Holmes Park was laid out in the 1880s, and named after Robert J. Holmes, an original owner of the site. A post office called Holmes Park was established in 1890, and remained in operation until 1955.
