= Tornado family =

Succession of tornadoes originating from the same storm cell

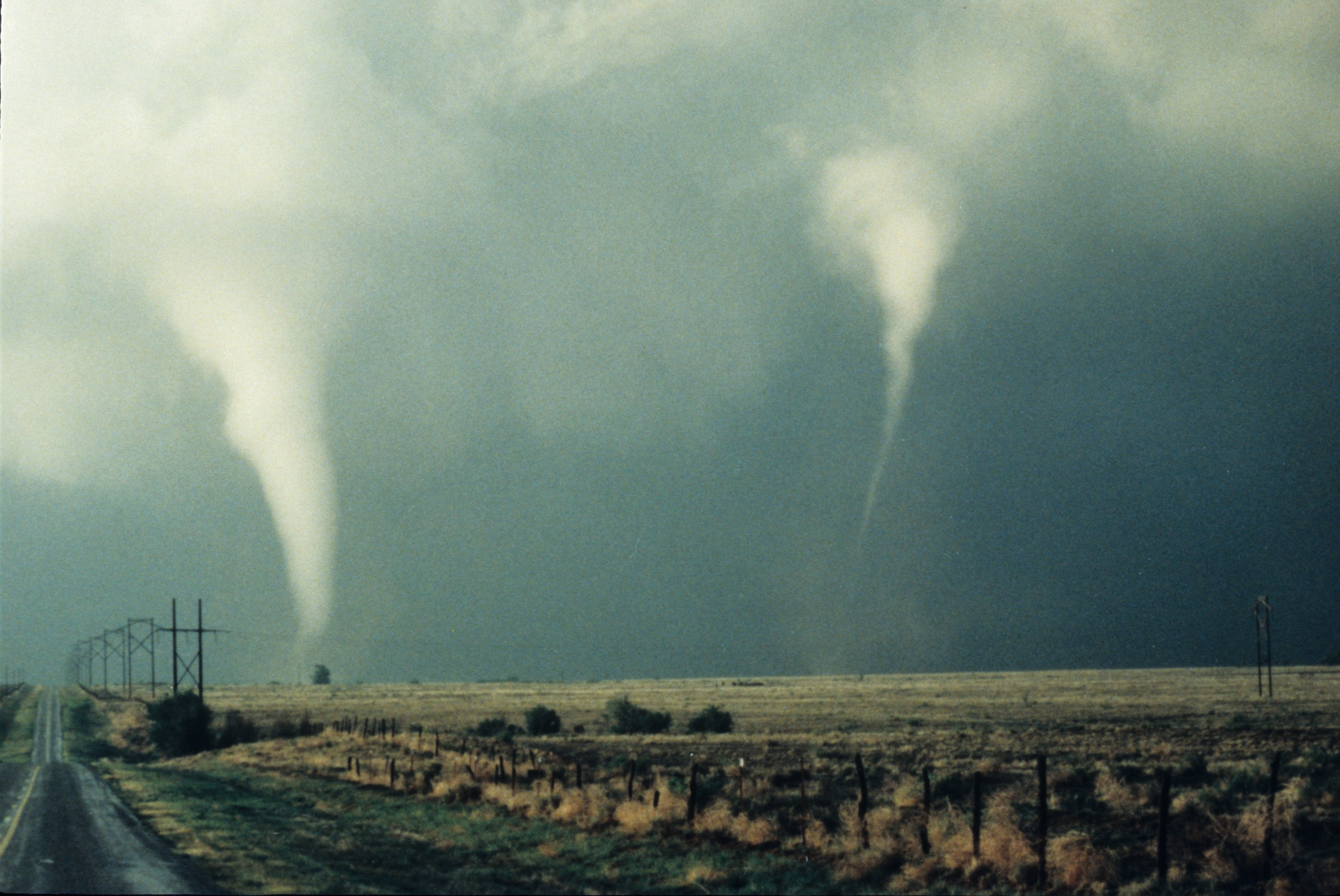
Twin tornadoes spawned from the same supercell near Amherst, TX on May 10, 1991

A tornado family is a series of tornadoes spawned by the same supercell thunderstorm. These families form a line of successive or parallel tornado paths and can cover a short span or a vast distance. Tornado families are sometimes mistaken as a single continuous tornado, especially prior to the 1970s. Sometimes the tornado tracks can overlap and expert analysis is necessary to determine whether or not damage was created by a family or a single tornado. Oftentimes, tornadoes are small and don’t make it far before dying out. However, large tornadoes are also present in many situations that track for very long distances. To determine the average track length of a tornado, both of these factors must be taken into account. The average track length for a typical tornado is about 1–2 miles, but they can vary from as little as a few feet to over 100 miles. In some cases, such as the Hesston-Goessel, Kansas tornadoes of March 1990, different tornadoes of a tornado family merge, making discerning whether an event was continuous or not more difficult.

Some tornado damage remains a mystery even today due to a lack of evidence. The Tri-State Tornado of March 1925 was one such event. It could either have been the longest single tornado recorded or a family of tornadoes. A thorough re-analyses project found that it was probably one continuous tornado for most of its path, likely bounded by separate tornadoes at the beginning and end of the very long track (VLT) tornado, and likely another significant tornado spawned many miles later. However, many other exceptional VLT events were later found to be tornado families with much shorter tornado path segments than originally thought, notably the Woodward, Oklahoma tornado family of April 1947 and the Charleston–Mattoon, Illinois tornado family of May 1917.

Tornado families can be a result of satellite tornadoes, cyclic tornadogenesis, or some combination thereof. Intense downbursts may also cause damage paths to appear continuous, although this was more an issue for historic tornadoes as such damage usually is now distinguishable as caused by straight-line winds. Especially when newly forming, tornadoes may sometimes exhibit brief breaks in the damage path even as the parent circulation is continuous. Such events may be considered as "skipping", a term that originally referred to what now is typically a tornado family. Successive tornadoes may be considered by some as separate tornadoes (and thus constituting a tornado family) only when spawned by a new tornadocyclone or low-level mesocyclone (and from within a new wall cloud).

== See also ==
- Tornado outbreak
- Tornadogenesis
- Tornado intensity
