= St. Munchin Catholic Church =

Coordinates: 39°44′30.27″N 94°14′31.7″W

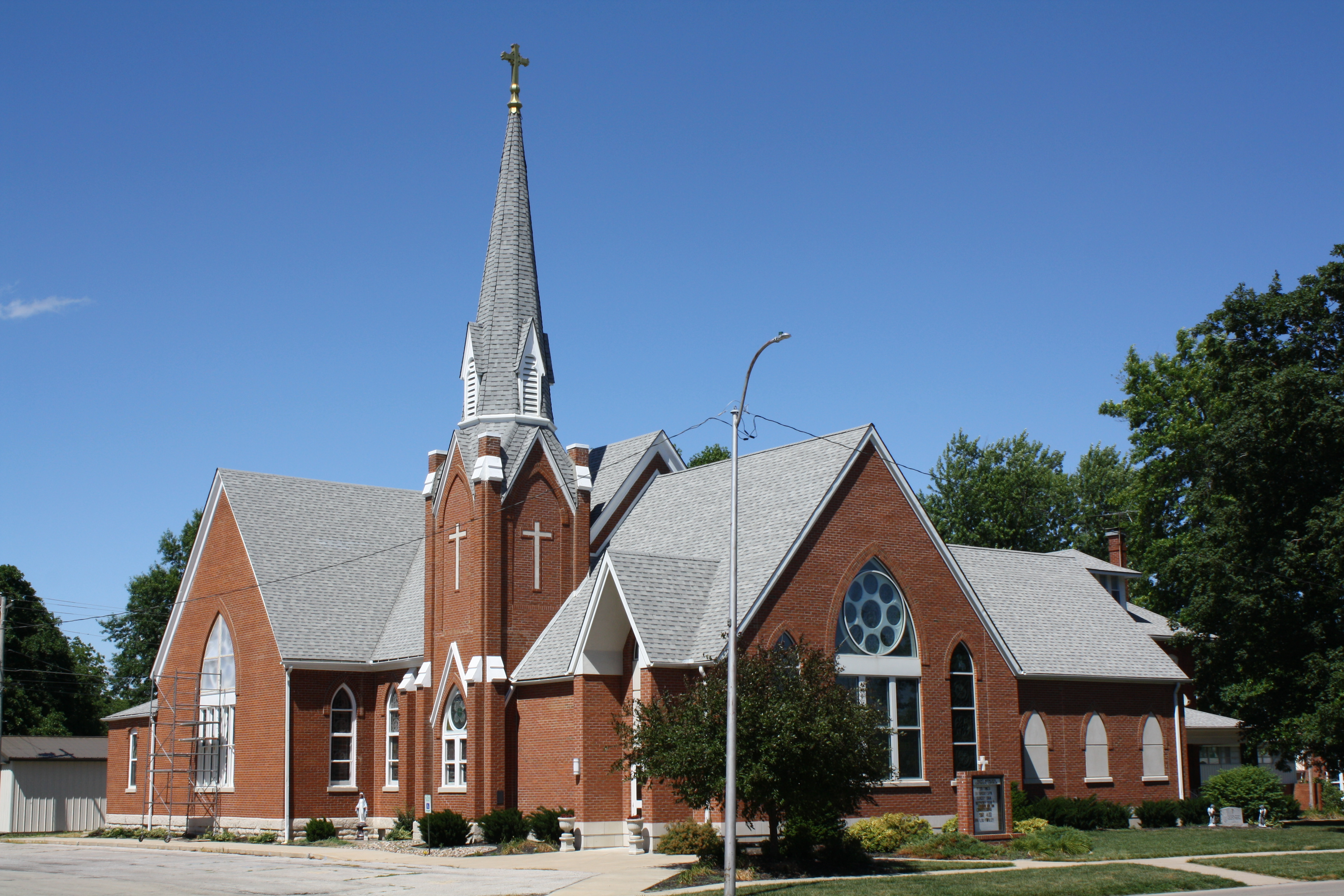
- St. Munchin Catholic Church
- Location: Cameron, Missouri, USA
- Denomination: Roman Catholic
- Website: Munchin.net

History
- Founded: October 1893
- Founder: John Joseph Hogan (1868-first church)

Architecture
- Years built: 1893, from bell tower back 2006, narthex to front, and right

Administration
- Diocese: Kansas City-St. Joseph

Clergy
- Pastor: Tom Ludwig

St. Munchin Parish is a parish of the Catholic Church located in Cameron, Missouri, in the Diocese of Kansas City–St. Joseph.

St. Munchin's was founded in 1868 by the Rev. John Joseph Hogan, later the first Bishop of St. Joseph.

== History ==
=== Founding ===
The area around Cameron was served by Jesuit missionaries and an occasional priest from St. Joseph, Missouri, until 1846 when Fr. Thomas Scanlan began coming from St. Joseph on a regular basis. Several families from Limerick, Ireland, had settled in the town and named their parish after one of the patrons of their former Diocese of Limerick, Mainchín of Limerick or St. Munchin. By 1857 about 12 Catholic families were attending Mass and by 1859 Hogan included Cameron on his Mass schedule in months that had a fifth Sunday, as he covered other towns along the Hannibal-St. Joseph railroad the first four Sundays.

Cameron took on new importance in the 1860s as the Hannibal and St. Joseph Railroad (later Burlington) began extending its route southward to the new "Hannibal" bridge crossing the Missouri River at Kansas City. In 1868 Hogan erected the first Catholic church building in Cameron since, as he said, "Cameron had at this time become a place of some importance, by its recent connection to Kansas City by railroad."

After Hogan became Bishop of St. Joseph in 1868, Fr. Thomas Ledwith came every two weeks from Liberty, Missouri, to celebrate Mass. In 1870 the first resident priest James Foley arrived and covered also Breckenridge and Kidder. He was followed by a succession of pastors, and the mission parishes covered would evolve, including at times Hamilton, Mirabile, and Osborn, later Gallatin and Maysville. In 1873 a two-story, frame rectory was constructed.

=== After 1893 ===
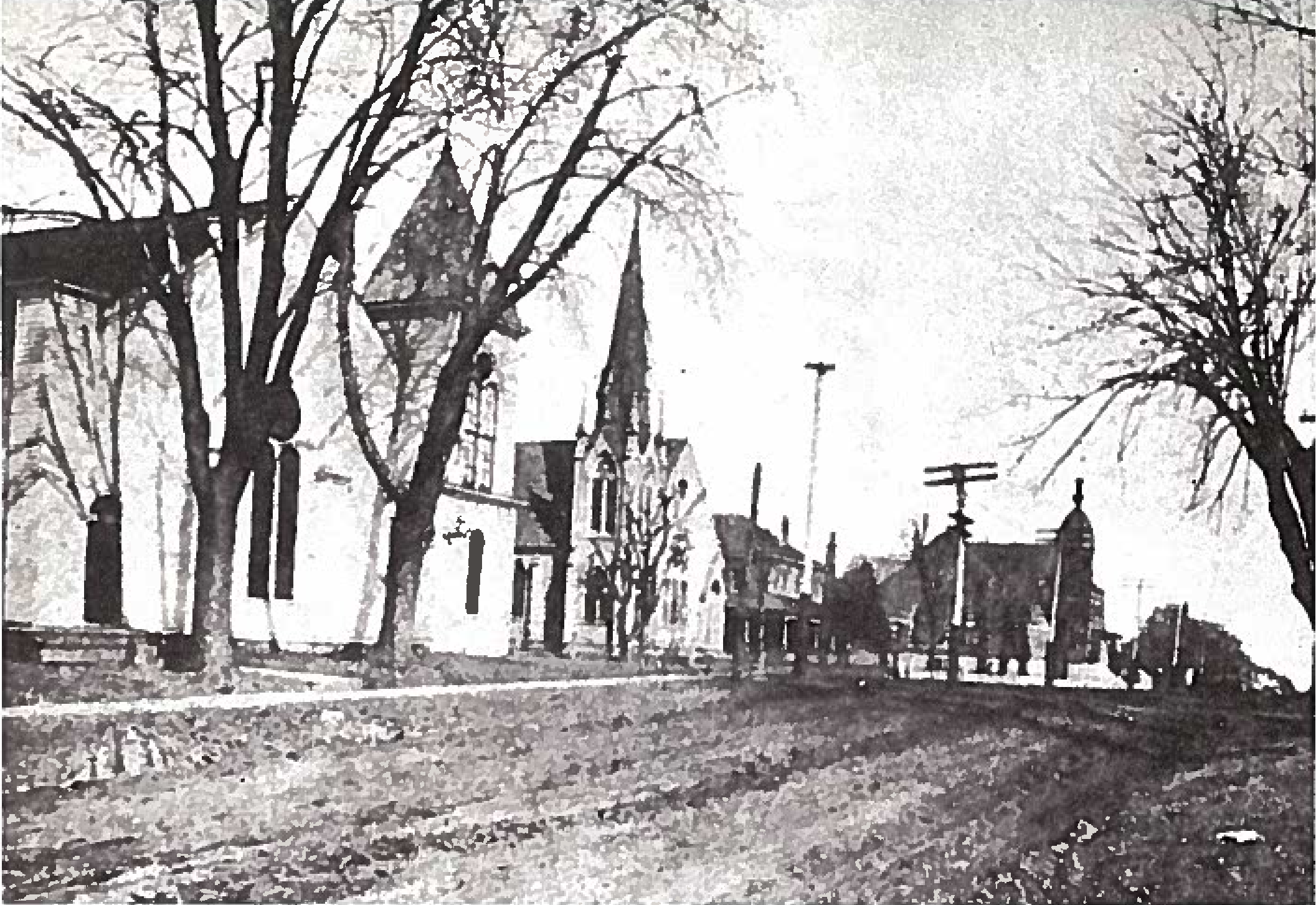
Congregational, Catholic and Methodist churches on Third Street in Cameron, Missouri, before 1918

In October 1893, the current brick church was built. In 1906 a Knights of Columbus Council was founded. In 1907 the present red brick rectory was constructed over the basement of the former rectory. It is seen (at right) to the east of the original church which can be seen without the narthex of 2001.

Fr. Richard J. Cullen was pastor from 1899 to 1924, and in his final year he opened St. Rita Academy. named after a favorite saint of his. It opened in the former Midland Hotel and soon moved to the Cox residence on Fourth Street. Three Sisters of the Holy Ghost taught kindergarten through eighth grade. In the late 1920s the Holy Ghost sisters were replaced by the Sisters of St. Francis from Clinton, Iowa. The original 60 students were mainly from rural, Irish families. A high school was added in 1925, but from 1931 until it closed in 1947 the last two years were dropped. In 1949 a new St. Rita school building was constructed, on land formerly occupied by a Congregational Church seen in photo at right. The school was closed in the spring of 1970, but continues to serve as classroom and meeting space.

In 1930 the Holy Name Society was founded with 97 members, and continued in the parish until 1980. In the mid-20th century there were about 400 adult Catholics in the parish, with the 1984 census showing 230 households and 630 Catholics. Since the construction of Western Missouri Correctional Center for men in Cameron in 1987, the parish has been responsible for supplying Mass for the inmates.

In 1971 the church was enlarged. After 2001, under pastor Paul Turner, the interior of the church was remodeled and a narthex added, along with a Reconciliation room, vesting room, and rest rooms.

== Pastors ==
John J. Hogan, 1857
Thomas Ledwith, 1868
James Foley, 1870
Thomas Walsh, 1871
Francis O'Reilly, 1872
J.R. Murphy, 1873
Thomas Denney, 1876
James O'Reilly, 1887
Richard J. Cullen, 1899

James S. Ryan, 1926
M.F. Wogan, 1930
John McKeon, 1942
Richard Saale, 1950 (administrator)
Denis O'Duignan, 1950
William F. Gott, 1956
Leo A. Boyle, 1962
John Hix, 1964
William Von Arx, 1967

Francis E. McGlynn, 1970
Thomas P. Whelan, 1970
John Eldringhoff, 1976
R. William Caldwell, 1983
Patrick Tobin, 1988
Alvin L. Herber, C.P.P.S., 1995
Paul A. Turner, 2001
Louis Farley, 2012
Thomas Ludwig, 2017

== Bibliography ==
- Dritch, Mary, et al. A Practical Guide for Catholics, 1900-1901. (Published by the parish.)
- History of Northwest Missouri. Chicago: Lewis Publishing Company (1915).
- The History of St. Munchin's Mission and Parish. Centennial booklet (1967).
- Turley, SHG, M. Immaculata. Mother Margaret Mary Healy-Murphy. San Antonio: Naylor (1969).
