= Missouri Route 116 =

State highway in Missouri, U.S.

Route 116
- MO 116 highlighted in red

Route information
- Maintained by MoDOT
- Length: 72.942 mi (117.389 km)

Major junctions
- West end: US 59 in Rushville
- Route 371 north of New Market; US 169 near Gower; Route 33 east of Plattsburg; I-35 / Route 110 (CKC) east of Lathrop; US 69 east of Lathrop; Route 13 at Polo
- East end: Route A in Braymer

Location
- Country: United States
- State: Missouri

Highway system
- Missouri State Highway System; Interstate; US; State; Supplemental
← Route 115	→ Route 117

Route 116 is a highway in northwestern Missouri. Its eastern terminus is at Route A in Braymer; its western terminus is at U.S. Route 59 in Rushville.

== Route description ==
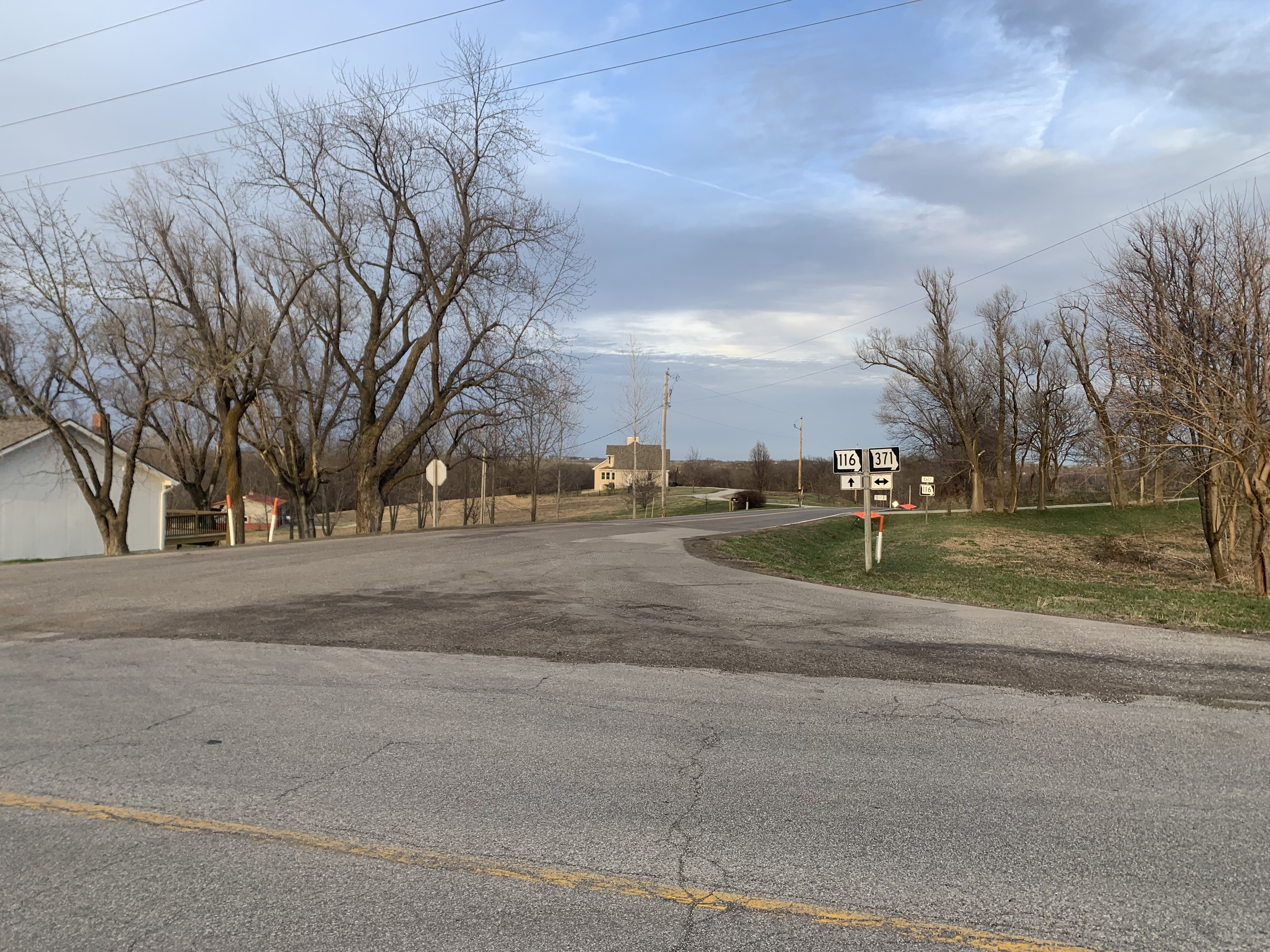
Route 116 junction with Route 371 two miles east of Wallace, MO

=== Rushville to Plattsburg ===
The western terminus of Route 116 is at US 59 at Rushville in Buchanan County. The highway travels easterly through the village, then meets a T-intersection with Route HH and turns south. It then turns east again after an intersection with Route M and continues for 3.5 miles. After another turn north, it junctions with Route HH and continues east-southeast to where it reaches Wallace just past Route V. From Wallace, it is 2 miles east to Route 371 and another mile to I-29, where it crosses, but it does not have any direct interchange with it. It intersects with Route Y, and it heads south on a concurrency with it, and then heads to the east again to the north of Dearborn. After another 11 miles east, where it crosses into Clinton County, it has an intersection with US 169. Route 116 continues another 6 miles to where it reaches Plattsburg.

=== Plattsburg to Braymer ===
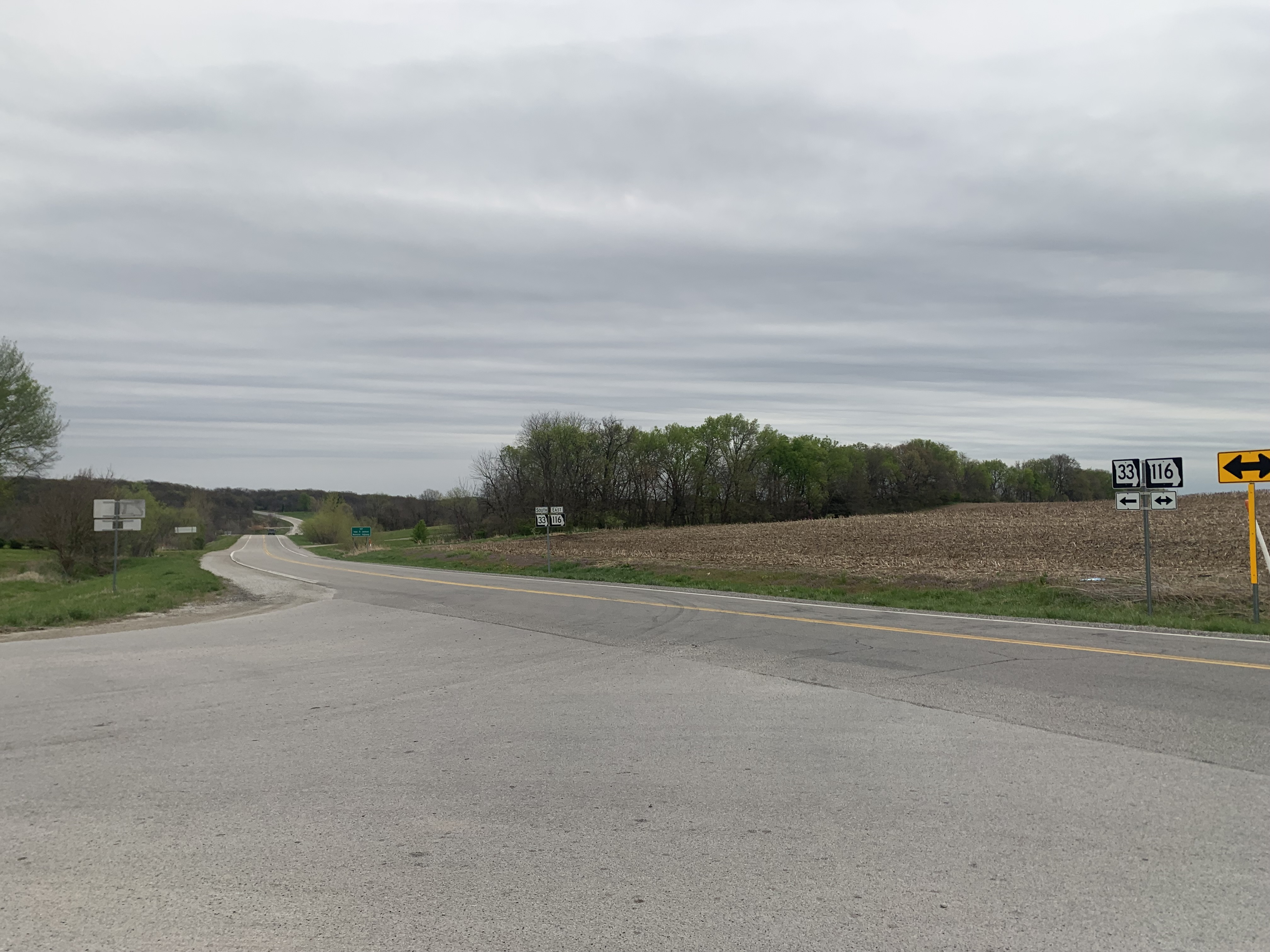
Junction between Missouri Route 33 and Route 116 east of Plattsburg, facing east.

In Plattsburg, Route 116 intersects Route C and crosses the Little Platte River, then it jolts northeast 1 mile as it leaves town before traveling another mile to its junction with Route 33. The route is concurrent with Route 33 for 5 miles until it reaches the town of Lathrop where Route 116 diverges, continuing east, at the junction with Route A. Route 116 then travels 3 miles east, passing south of Lake McGinness, and has an interchange with I-35 at Exit 40. About 2 miles east, there is a roundabout with US 69 near the Clinton-Caldwell border. From the county border, there are two junctions with Route D and Route T as it travels 9 miles east to reach Polo. In Polo, it intersects with Route 13 and runs concurrent for 1 mile north before diverging east. From there, Route 116 travels 6 miles to its junction with Route B, just north of Cowgill. Then, the highway travels east-northeast to Braymer for 7 miles before meeting its eastern terminus at Route A in southeast Caldwell County.

== History ==
Route 116 from Plattsburg to U.S. Route 169 was originally part of Route 33 until that highway was re-routed in 1934.

== Major intersections ==
County	Location	mi	km	Destinations	Notes
Buchanan	Rushville	0.000	0.000	US 59 – Atchison, St. Joseph	
Buchanan	Crawford Township	15.244	24.533	Route 371 – Faucett, New Market	
Clinton	Atchison Township	29.600	47.637	US 169 – Gower, Grayson	
Clinton	Concord Township	38.016	61.181	Route 33 north to US 36	Western end of Route 33 overlap
Clinton	Lathrop	42.850	68.960	Route 33 south / Route A – Lathrop, Turney	Eastern end of Route 33 overlap
Clinton	Lathrop Township	46.132	74.242	I-35 / Route 110 (CKC) – Cameron, Kansas City	exit 40 on I-35
Clinton	Lathrop Township	48.028	77.294	US 69 – Cameron, Excelsior Springs	
Caldwell	Polo	58.549	94.225	Route 13 south – Knoxville	Western end of Route 13 overlap
Caldwell	Grant Township	59.555	95.844	Route 13 north – Kingston	Eastern end of Route 13 overlap
Caldwell	Braymer	72.942	117.389	Route A to US 36 – Tinney Grove	
1.000 mi = 1.609 km; 1.000 km = 0.621 mi: Concurrency terminus
