= Calvin Woolsey =

American pianist

- Born: Calvin Lee Woolsey; December 26, 1883; Tinney's Point, Missouri, U.S.
- Died: November 12, 1946 Braymer, Missouri, U.S.
- Genres: Ragtime
- Occupations: Physician, composer and pianist
- Instrument: Piano
- Years active: 1909 – 1918

Calvin Woolsey (December 26, 1883 – November 12, 1946) was an American composer, pianist, and medical doctor.

== Biography ==
Woolsey was the middle of three children born to Napoleon and Gertrude Woolsey. Woolsey was a descendant of George (Joris) Woolsey, one of the earliest settlers of New Amsterdam, and Thomas Cornell.

Woolsey was raised in Tinney Grove, Missouri, just south of the city of Braymer. He earned a medical degree from the University of Missouri and did his post-graduate work at Harvard Medical School. He joined the Army Medical Corps during World War I and attained the rank of 1st Lieutenant.

He composed rags in the folk ragtime style that was popular around 1900. He sold two of these to Jerome H. Remick and self-published several others. He also published a waltz and a march.

He died at home, in 1946, of a coronary thrombosis.

== Compositions ==
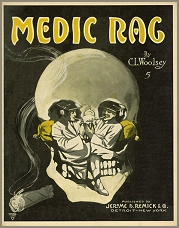
cover art from sheet music for "Medic Rag" (1910)

- "Funny Bones" (rag, 1909)
- "Dissatisfied" (1910)
- "Poison Rag" (1910)
- "Medic Rag" (1910)
- "Peroxide Rag" (1910)
- "Mashed Potatoes" (rag, 1911)
- "Bill Johnson" (1912)
- "Purple and White" (march, 1913)
- "Lover's Lane Glide" (rag, 1914)
- "Hearts Across The Sea" (waltz, 1918)

== See also ==
- List of ragtime composers
