= Frank B. Klepper =

American lawyer and politician (1864–1933)

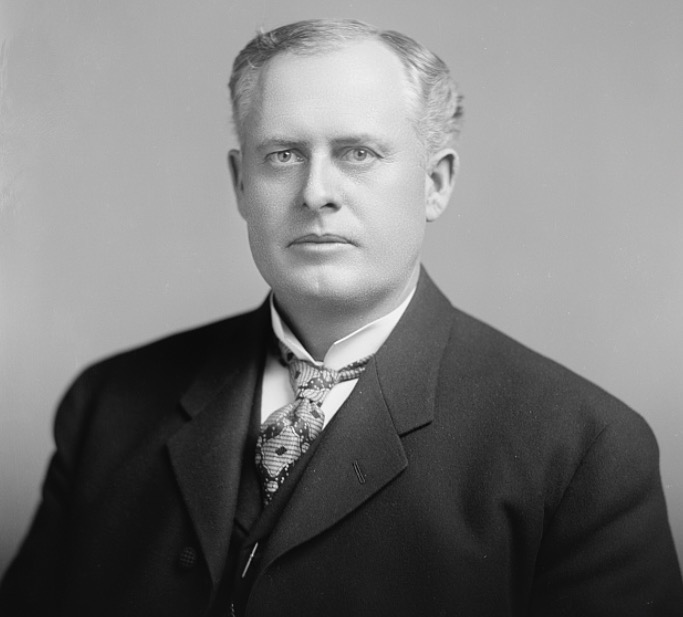
- Portrait of Klepper by Charles Milton Bell

Member of the U.S. House of Representatives from Missouri's 3rd district
- In office March 4, 1905 – March 3, 1907
- Preceded by: John Dougherty
- Succeeded by: Joshua Willis Alexander

Personal details
- Born: June 22, 1864 St. John, Putnam County, Missouri, US
- Died: August 4, 1933 (aged 69) Cameron, Missouri, US
- Party: Republican
- Occupation: Lawyer, politician

Frank B. Klepper (June 22, 1864 – August 4, 1933) was an American lawyer and politician. A Republican, he was a member of the United States House of Representatives from Missouri.

== Biography ==
Klepper was born on June 22, 1864, in St. John, Putnam County, Missouri. Of Dutch ancestry, his parents were businessman Thomas G. Klepper and Mary E. (née Hoyt) Klepper. He lived in Mirabile for ten years, attending common schools in nearby Lathrop. He later moved to Clinton County to farm. He studied at Baker University and the University of Missouri School of Law, graduating from the latter in 1898. For two years between universities, he worked as an educator. He was admitted to the bar in 1898, after which he began practice in Polo.

A Republican, Klepper served as district attorney of Caldwell County from 1900 to 1905. He represented Missouri's 3rd district in the United States House of Representatives, from March 4, 1905, to March 3, 1907. While serving, he was part of the House Subcommittee on Water, Wildlife and Fisheries. He lost the bid for renomination. Politically, he was supported by President Theodore Roosevelt.

In 1907, Klepper moved to Cameron. There, he worked as a farmer and banker, and from 1916 to 1920, served as district attorney of Clinton County. Physically, he stood at 6 ft 4 in (1.93 m) and weighed 280 pounds (130 kg). On November 30, 1893, he married Lela Madden; they had four children together. He was a trustee of multiple schools and a member of multiple fraternities. He died on August 4, 1933, aged 69, in Cameron, and was buried in Evergreen Cemetery, in Cameron.

U.S. House of Representatives
Preceded by John Dougherty	Member of the U.S. House of Representatives from Missouri's 3rd congressional district 1905-1907	Succeeded by Joshua Willis Alexander
