= Gomer Township, Caldwell County, Missouri =

Township in the US state of Missouri

Gomer Township
- Township
- Coordinates: 39°44′05″N 093°55′24″W
- Country: United States
- State: Missouri
- County: Caldwell

Area
  - Total: 36.28 sq mi (93.97 km^{2})
  - Land: 36.22 sq mi (93.82 km^{2})
  - Water: 0.058 sq mi (0.15 km^{2}) 0.16%
- Elevation: 961 ft (293 m)

Population (2000)
  - Total: 298
  - Density: 8.3/sq mi (3.2/km^{2})
- FIPS code: 29-27784
- GNIS feature ID: 0766361

Gomer Township is one of twelve townships in Caldwell County, Missouri, and is part of the Kansas City metropolitan area with the USA. As of the 2000 census, its population was 298.

== History ==
Gomer Township was established on November 4th, 1869, and named after Gomer, an old variant name of Nettleton.

== Geography ==
Gomer Township covers an area of 36.28 square miles (94.0 km^{2}) and contains no incorporated settlements.
