= Proctorville, Missouri =

Extinct Hamlet in Missouri, U.S.

Coordinates: 39°40′09″N 93°46′40″W

Proctorville is an extinct hamlet in eastern Caldwell County, in the U.S. state of Missouri. The settlement peaked at around 100 inhabitants. The town has largely dissipated by the early 20th century.

Catawba was located about 4 miles southwest. Its elevation is 801 feet. The community's namesake is survived by a lone church.
