= Mirabile Township, Caldwell County, Missouri =

Township in the US state of Missouri

Mirabile Township
- Township
- Coordinates: 39°39′52″N 094°08′05″W
- Country: United States
- State: Missouri
- County: Caldwell

Area
  - Total: 35.82 sq mi (92.77 km^{2})
  - Land: 35.76 sq mi (92.62 km^{2})
  - Water: 0.062 sq mi (0.16 km^{2}) 0.17%
- Elevation: 948 ft (289 m)

Population (2000)
  - Total: 362
  - Density: 10/sq mi (3.9/km^{2})
- Time zone: UTC-6 (Central (CST))
  - Summer (DST): UTC-5 (CDT)
- ZIP code: 64671
- Area code: 660
- FIPS code: 29-48872
- GNIS feature ID: 0766367

Mirabile Township is one of twelve townships in Caldwell County, Missouri, and is part of the Kansas City metropolitan area with the USA. As of the 2000 census, its population was 362. Mirabile is also the name of the school district.

== History ==
Mirabile Township was established on May 4th, 1870 and was formed out of Rockford Township. Mirabile is derived from a Latin word meaning "wonderful".

== Geography ==
Mirabile Township covers an area of 35.82 square miles (92.8 km^{2}) and contains no incorporated settlements. It contains three cemeteries: Hill, Morris, and Paxton.

A hamlet called Plum Creek existed in Mirabile Township and had a post office, church, school, cemetery, and several homes.

The streams of Brushy Creek, Plum Creek, Sheep Creek, and Willow Branch run through this township.
