= Black Oak, Missouri =

Unincorporated community in Missouri, U.S.

Coordinates: 39°32′50″N 93°50′19″W

Black Oak is an unincorporated community in southern Caldwell County, in the U.S. state of Missouri.

== History ==
Black Oak was platted in the early 1870s, and named for a grove of black oak trees near the original town site. A post office called Black Oak was established on July 27, 1868, and remained in operation until June 30, 1904. The town had a peak population of around 150 inhabitants. When Braymer was established because of the railroad, the town dissipated. Only a church and cemetery remain today.
