= Davis Township, Caldwell County, Missouri =

Township in the US state of Missouri

Davis Township
- Township
- Coordinates: 39°35′02″N 093°48′05″W
- Country: United States
- State: Missouri
- County: Caldwell

Area
  - Total: 35.54 sq mi (92.06 km^{2})
  - Land: 35.53 sq mi (92.02 km^{2})
  - Water: 0.015 sq mi (0.04 km^{2}) 0.04%
- Elevation: 751 ft (229 m)

Population (2000)
  - Total: 1,296
  - Density: 37/sq mi (14.1/km^{2})
- FIPS code: 29-18370
- GNIS feature ID: 0766359

Davis Township is one of twelve townships in Caldwell County, Missouri, and is part of the Kansas City metropolitan area with the USA. At the 2000 census, its population was 1,296.

== History ==
Davis Township was organized on November 4th, 1869, and gets its name from John T. and Samuel D. Davis, pioneer settlers.

== Geography ==
Davis Township covers an area of 35.54 square miles (92.0 km^{2}) and contains one incorporated settlement, Braymer.

The streams of North Mud Creek and Willow Creek run through the township.

== Transportation ==
Davis Township contains one airport or landing strip, Wright Landing Field.
