= Breckenridge Township =

Breckenridge Township may refer to the following townships in the United States:

- Breckenridge Township, Wilkin County, Minnesota
- Breckenridge Township, Caldwell County, Missouri
