= Kidder Township =

Kidder Township may refer to the following townships in the United States:

- Kidder Township, Caldwell County, Missouri
- Kidder Township, Pennsylvania
