= Nettleton, Missouri =

Unincorporated community in Missouri, U.S.

Coordinates: 39°45′29″N 93°54′17″W

Nettleton is an unincorporated community in northern Caldwell County, in the U.S. state of Missouri.

== History ==
The town of Nettleton was laid out in 1868. A post office was established in 1872, and remained in operation until 1980. Its original name was Gomer but the name changed by a court order to Nettleton after George H. Nettleton, a railroad man.

== Geography ==
Nettleton lies on Missouri Route B about halfway between Hamilton and Breckenridge, being about 5 miles away from both. The headwaters of Otter Creek, Lick Fork, and Kettle Creek all surround this relatively high elevation place.
