= Caldwell County, Missouri =

County in Missouri, United States

- County
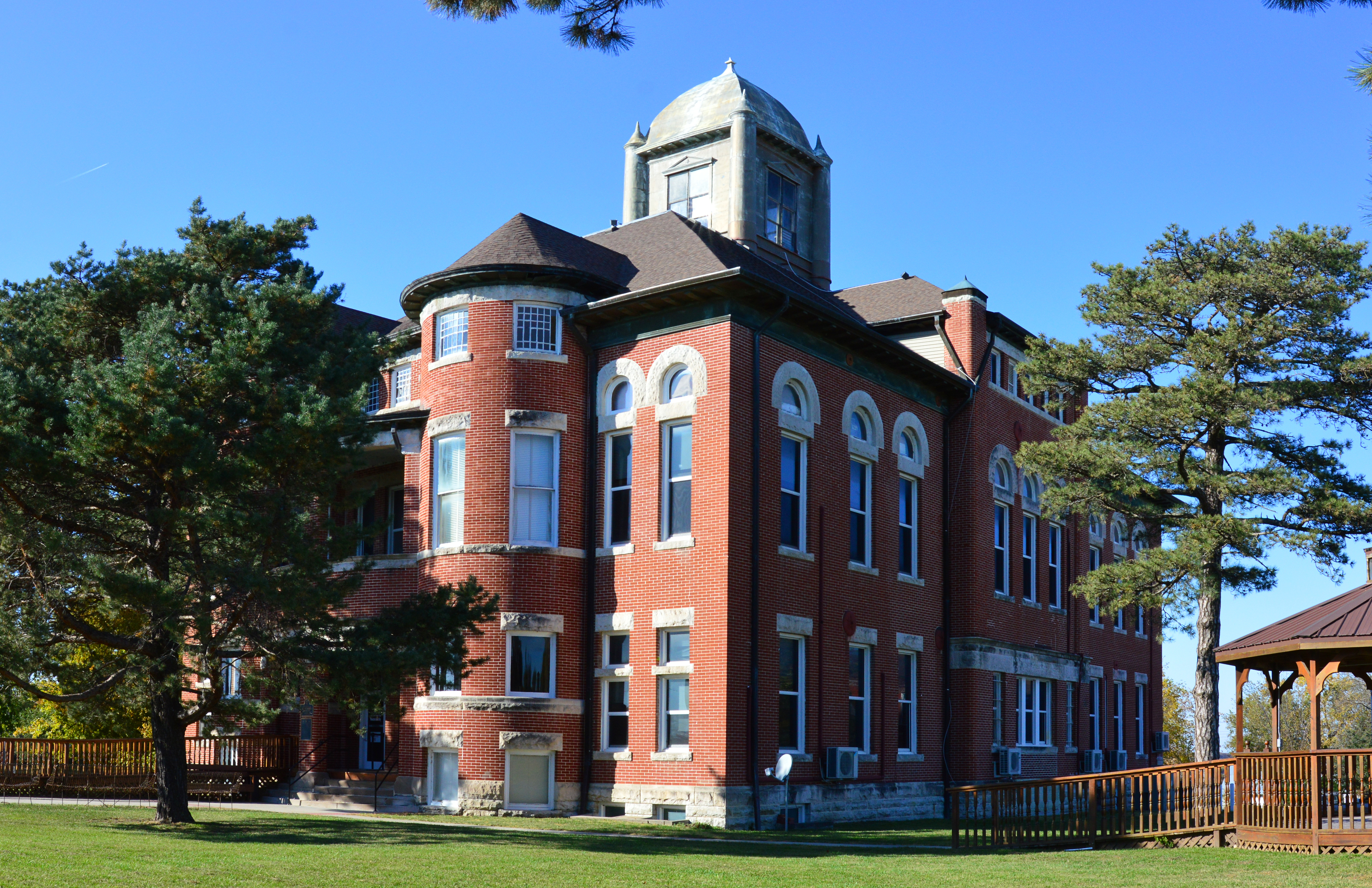
- Caldwell County Courthouse in Kingston

- Location within the U.S. state of Missouri
- Coordinates: 39°40′N 93°59′W
- Country: United States
- State: Missouri
- Founded: December 29, 1836
- Named for: John Caldwell
- Seat: Kingston
- Largest city: Hamilton

Area
  - Total: 430 sq mi (1,100 km^{2})
  - Land: 426 sq mi (1,100 km^{2})
  - Water: 3.2 sq mi (8.3 km^{2}) 0.8%

Population (2020)
  - Total: 8,815
  - Estimate (2025): 9,012 ▲
  - Density: 20.7/sq mi (7.99/km^{2})
- Time zone: UTC−6 (Central)
  - Summer (DST): UTC−5 (CDT)
- Congressional district: 6th
- Website: www.caldwellco.missouri.org

Caldwell County is a county located in Missouri, United States. As of the 2020 census, the county's population was 8,815. It is part of the Kansas City metropolitan area. Its county seat is Kingston. The county was organized December 29, 1836, and named by Alexander Doniphan to honor John Caldwell, who participated in George Rogers Clark's Native American Campaign of 1786 and was the second Lieutenant Governor of Kentucky.

Caldwell County was originally established as a haven for Mormons, who had been driven from Jackson County in November 1833, and had been refugees in adjacent Clay County since. The county was one of the principal settings of the 1838 Missouri Mormon War, which led to the expulsion of all Latter Day Saints from Missouri, following the issuance of an "extermination order" by then–Governor Lilburn Boggs.

== History ==
=== Mormon settlement ===
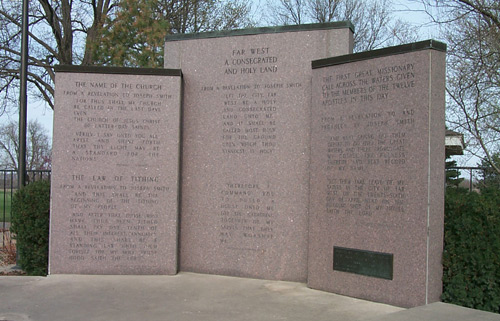
Monument at the temple site in Far West, Missouri.

Caldwell County was originally part of Ray County. The first white settler was Jesse Mann Sr., who settled one-half mile northeast of the public square of Kingston on Shoal Creek in 1831. The early settlers moved back south in 1832 for better protection during the Black Hawk War uprising.

A few Mormon settlers, who had been evicted from Jackson County, Missouri, moved into the county in 1832, and included Jacob Hawn, whose mill on Shoal Creek would become the scene of the bloodiest incident in the Mormon War, known as the Hawn's Mill Massacre.

The settlers established Salem, the first town in the county, two miles southeast of Kingston. A larger number of Mormons moved to the county in the fall of 1836. The Missouri General Assembly created Caldwell County in December 1836, with the understanding that it would be dedicated to Mormon settlers. Its county seat was Far West, Missouri. By 1838 Far West reported a population of 4,000.

The major figures of early Mormon history, including Joseph Smith, Hyrum Smith, Brigham Young, John Taylor, Edward Partridge, Sidney Rigdon, Parley P. Pratt and John D. Lee, were included in the migration.

=== Mormon War ===
Mormon settlers moved further north into Daviess County, particularly at Adam-ondi-Ahman, after Smith proclaimed that it was the Biblical place where Adam and Eve were banished after leaving the Garden of Eden. He said it would be a gathering place on the Judgement Day. The Mormon War erupted following a skirmish between original Missouri settlers and Mormon settlers in the Gallatin Election Day Battle.

After the Missouri militia was routed in the Battle of Crooked Creek, Governor Lilburn Boggs issued Missouri Executive Order 44 (Mormon Extermination Order) to evict the Mormons from the state. Three days later, a group from Livingston County killed 18 Mormons in the Hawn's Mill massacre. Troops laid siege to Far West, where Smith surrendered in October 1838. The settlers agreed to leave; they abandoned Far West and initially regrouped in Quincy, Illinois, for the winter of 1838–39. The following spring, they founded Nauvoo, Illinois.

Following the dissolution of Far West, the county seat was moved to present-day Kingston.

== Geography ==
According to the U.S. Census Bureau, the county has a total area of 430 square miles (1,100 km^{2}), of which 426 square miles (1,100 km^{2}) is land and 3.2 square miles (8.3 km^{2}) (0.8%) is water.

=== Adjacent counties ===
- Daviess County (north)
- Livingston County (east)
- Carroll County (southeast)
- Ray County (south)
- Clinton County (west)
- DeKalb County (northwest)

=== Major highways ===
- Future I-72 / US 36 / Route 110 (CKC)
  - US 36 Bus. (Hamilton)
- Route 13
- Route 116

== Demographics ==
Historical population
Census	Pop.	Note	%±
1840	1,458		—
1850	2,310		58.4%
1860	5,034		117.9%
1870	11,390		126.3%
1880	13,646		19.8%
1890	15,152		11.0%
1900	16,656		9.9%
1910	14,605		−12.3%
1920	13,849		−5.2%
1930	12,509		−9.7%
1940	11,629		−7.0%
1950	9,929		−14.6%
1960	8,830		−11.1%
1970	8,351		−5.4%
1980	8,660		3.7%
1990	8,380		−3.2%
2000	8,969		7.0%
2010	9,424		5.1%
2020	8,815		−6.5%
2025 (est.)	9,012	▲	2.2%
U.S. Decennial Census; 1790-1960 1900-1990; 1990-2000 2010-2015

=== 2020 census ===
Caldwell County, Missouri – Racial and ethnic composition Note: the US Census treats Hispanic/Latino as an ethnic category. This table excludes Latinos from the racial categories and assigns them to a separate category. Hispanics/Latinos may be of any race.
Race / Ethnicity (NH = Non-Hispanic)	Pop 1980	Pop 1990	Pop 2000	Pop 2010	Pop 2020	% 1980	% 1990	% 2000	% 2010	% 2020
White alone (NH)	8,594	8,293	8,786	9,035	8,172	99.24%	98.96%	97.96%	95.87%	92.71%
Black or African American alone (NH)	4	14	12	39	65	0.05%	0.17%	0.13%	0.41%	0.74%
Native American or Alaska Native alone (NH)	12	21	29	33	34	0.14%	0.25%	0.32%	0.35%	0.39%
Asian alone (NH)	8	1	11	18	26	0.09%	0.01%	0.12%	0.19%	0.29%
Native Hawaiian or Pacific Islander alone (NH)	x	x	0	2	7	x	x	0.00%	0.02%	0.08%
Other race alone (NH)	1	1	8	3	23	0.01%	0.01%	0.09%	0.03%	0.26%
Mixed race or Multiracial (NH)	x	x	56	151	337	x	x	0.62%	1.60%	3.82%
Hispanic or Latino (any race)	41	50	67	143	151	0.47%	0.60%	0.75%	1.52%	1.71%
Total	8,660	8,380	8,969	9,424	8,815	100.00%	100.00%	100.00%	100.00%	100.00%

As of the 2020 census, the county had a population of 8,815. The median age was 43.5 years. 23.2% of residents were under the age of 18 and 21.1% of residents were 65 years of age or older. For every 100 females there were 103.4 males, and for every 100 females age 18 and over there were 99.3 males age 18 and over. 0.0% of residents lived in urban areas, while 100.0% lived in rural areas.

The racial makeup of the county was 93.6% White, 0.8% Black or African American, 0.4% American Indian and Alaska Native, 0.3% Asian, 0.1% Native Hawaiian and Pacific Islander, 0.6% from some other race, and 4.3% from two or more races. Hispanic or Latino residents of any race comprised 1.7% of the population.

There were 3,522 households in the county, of which 29.0% had children under the age of 18 living with them and 21.7% had a female householder with no spouse or partner present. About 27.8% of all households were made up of individuals and 14.1% had someone living alone who was 65 years of age or older.

There were 4,218 housing units, of which 16.5% were vacant. Among occupied housing units, 76.6% were owner-occupied and 23.4% were renter-occupied. The homeowner vacancy rate was 2.0% and the rental vacancy rate was 6.4%.

=== 2000 census ===
As of the census of 2000, there were 8,969 people, 3,523 households, and 2,501 families residing in the county. The population density was 8/km^{2} (21/mi^{2}). There were 4,493 housing units at an average density of 4/km^{2} (10/mi^{2}). The racial makeup of the county was 98.56% White, 0.13% Black or African American, 0.33% Native American, 0.12% Asian, 0.00% Pacific Islander, 0.18% from other races, and 0.67% from two or more races. 0.75% of the population were Hispanic or Latino of any race.

There were 3,523 households, out of which 32.30% had children under the age of 18 living with them, 59.20% were married couples living together, 8.00% had a female householder with no husband present, and 29.00% were non-families. 25.50% of all households were made up of individuals, and 13.00% had someone living alone who was 65 years of age or older. The average household size was 2.51, and the average family size was 3.04.

In the county, the population was spread out, with 27.10% under the age of 18, 7.10% from 18 to 24, 25.10% from 25 to 44, 23.70% from 45 to 64, and 17.00% who were 65 years of age or older. The median age was 39 years. For every 100 females there were 97.60 males. For every 100 females age 18 and over, there were 93.90 males.

The median income for a household in the county was $31,240, and the median income for a family was $37,087. Males had a median income of $28,710 versus $19,523 for females. The per capita income for the county was $15,343. 11.90% of the population and 9.70% of families were below the poverty line. Out of the total population, 15.10% of those under the age of 18 and 12.90% of those 65 and older were living below the poverty line.

== Education ==
K-12 school districts with portions of the county include:

- Braymer C-4 School District
- Breckenridge R-I School District
- Cameron R-I School District
- Hamilton R-II School District
- Lathrop R-II School District
- Polo R-VII School District
- Southwest Livingston County R-I School District

Elementary school districts with portions of the county include:

- Cowgill R-VI School District
- Kingston 42 School District
- Mirabile C-1 School District
- New York R-IV School District

=== Public Schools ===
- Braymer C-4 School District – Braymer
  - Braymer Elementary School (PK-06)
  - Braymer High School (07-12)
- Breckenridge R-I School District – Breckenridge
  - Breckinridge Elementary School (PK-06)
  - Breckinridge High School (07-12)
- Cowgill R-VI School District – Cowgill
  - Cowgill Elementary School (Pk-08)
- Kingston School District No. 42 – Kingston
  - Kingston Elementary School (PK-08)
- Mirabile C-1 School District – Polo
  - Mirabile Elementary School (PK-08)
- New York R-IV School District – Hamilton
  - New York Elementary School (K-08)
- Polo R-VII School District – Polo
  - Polo Elementary School (PK-04)
  - Polo Middle School (05-08)
  - Polo High School (09-12)
- Hamilton R-2 School District - Hamilton

=== Public libraries ===
- Breckenridge Public Library
- Hamilton Public Library

== Communities ==
=== Cities ===
- Braymer
- Breckenridge
- Cowgill
- Hamilton
- Kidder
- Kingston (county seat)
- Polo

=== Ghost town ===
- Far West

=== Townships ===
Caldwell County is divided into 12 townships

- Breckenridge
- Davis
- Fairview
- Gomer
- Grant
- Hamilton
- Kidder
- Kingston
- Lincoln
- Mirabile
- New York
- Rockford

=== Unincorporated communities ===
- Black Oak
- Bonanza
- Catawba
- Gould Farm
- Mirabile
- Nettleton
- Proctorville

== Notable people ==
- Colin Brown, former NFL player for the Kansas City Chiefs, Baltimore Ravens, and Buffalo Bills
- Herb Conyers, former professional baseball player for the Cleveland Indians
- Jenny Doan, Quilter for Missouri Star Quilt Company
- Charles J. Hughes Jr., U.S. Senator from Colorado (1909-1911)
- James Kirkpatrick, Missouri Secretary of State (1965-1985)
- Frank B. Klepper, U.S. Representative from Missouri (1905-1907)
- Glen Lukens, prominent Western ceramics artist
- James Cash Penney, founder of JC Penney
- Mack Wheat, Major League Baseball player
- Zack Wheat, Major League Baseball player

== Politics ==
=== Local ===
The Republican Party controls politics at the local level in Caldwell County. Republicans hold all but one of the elected positions in the county.

Caldwell County, Missouri

Elected countywide officials
Assessor	Beverly Alden	Republican
Circuit Clerk	Carrie Miller	Democratic
County Clerk	Christine Owen	Republican
Commissioner (presiding)	C.R. (Bud) Motsinger	Republican
Commissioner (district 1)	Jonathan Abbott	Republican
Commissioner (district 2)	Rex J. Hibler	Republican
Coroner	Dana Brown	Republican
Prosecuting Attorney	Brady C. Kopek	Republican
Public Administrator	Richard Lee	Republican
Recorder	Julie Hill	Republican
Sheriff	Mitchell K. Allen	Republican
Treasurer	June Grooms	Republican

=== State ===
Past Gubernatorial Elections Results
Year	Republican	Democratic	Third Parties
2024	77.49% 3,601	20.23% 940	2.28% 106
2020	77.48% 3,603	19.70% 916	2.82% 131
2016	63.10% 2,276	33.40% 1,443	3.50% 151
2012	50.39% 2,092	45.33% 1,882	4.29% 178
2008	44.58% 2,014	52.26% 2,361	3.16% 143
2004	56.40% 2,419	41.87% 1,796	1.73% 74
2000	52.01% 2,006	44.10% 1,701	3.89% 150
1996	38.04% 1,314	58.80% 2,031	3.16% 109

All of Caldwell County is a part of Missouri's 8th District in the Missouri House of Representatives and is currently represented by Randy Railsback (R-Hamilton).

Missouri House of Representatives — District 8 — Caldwell County (2020)
Party	Candidate	Votes	%	±%
Republican	Randy Railsback	4,203	100.00%	+21.81

Missouri House of Representatives — District 8 — Caldwell County (2018)
Party	Candidate	Votes	%	±%
Republican	James W. (Jim) Neely	2,907	78.19%	−21.81
Democratic	Caleb McKnight	811	21.81%	+21.81

All of Caldwell County is a part of Missouri's 21st District in the Missouri Senate and is currently represented by Denny Hoskins (R-Warrensburg).

Missouri Senate — District 21 — Caldwell County (2020)
Party	Candidate	Votes	%	±%
Republican	Denny Hoskins	3,651	83.55%	+10.57
Libertarian	Mark Bliss	719	16.46%	+10.05

Missouri Senate — District 21 — Caldwell County (2016)
Party	Candidate	Votes	%	±%
Republican	Denny Hoskins	3,039	72.98%	+6.24
Democratic	ElGene Ver Dught	858	20.61%	−5.37
Libertarian	Bill Wayne	267	6.41%	−0.87

=== Federal ===
All of Caldwell County is included in Missouri's 6th Congressional District and is currently represented by Sam Graves (R-Tarkio) in the U.S. House of Representatives. Graves was elected to an eleventh term in 2020 over Democratic challenger Gena Ross.

U.S. House of Representatives – Missouri’s 6th Congressional District – Caldwell County (2020)
Party	Candidate	Votes	%	±%
Republican	Sam Graves	3,693	80.23%	+3.27
Democratic	Gena L. Ross	769	16.69%	−3.45
Libertarian	Jim Higgins	142	3.09%	+0.19

U.S. House of Representatives – Missouri's 6th Congressional District – Caldwell County (2018)
Party	Candidate	Votes	%	±%
Republican	Sam Graves	2,893	76.96%	+2.34
Democratic	Henry Robert Martin	757	20.14%	−0.09
Libertarian	Dan Hogan	109	2.90%	−0.71

Caldwell County, along with the rest of the state of Missouri, is represented in the U.S. Senate by Josh Hawley (R-Columbia) and Roy Blunt (R-Strafford).

U.S. Senate – Class I – Caldwell County (2018)
Party	Candidate	Votes	%	±%
Republican	Josh Hawley	2,558	67.71%	+22.23
Democratic	Claire McCaskill	1,022	27.05%	−17.27
Independent	Craig O'Dear	102	2.70%	
Libertarian	Japheth Campbell	70	1.85%	−8.36
Green	Jo Crain	26	0.69%	+0.69

Blunt was elected to a second term in 2016 over then-Missouri Secretary of State Jason Kander.

U.S. Senate — Class III — Caldwell County (2016)
Party	Candidate	Votes	%	±%
Republican	Roy Blunt	2,513	58.25%	+12.77
Democratic	Jason Kander	1,517	35.16%	−9.15
Libertarian	Jonathan Dine	153	3.55%	−6.66
Green	Johnathan McFarland	78	1.81%	+1.81
Constitution	Fred Ryman	53	1.23%	+1.23

United States presidential election results for Caldwell County, Missouri
Year	Republican		Democratic		Third party(ies)	
Year	No.	%	No.	%	No.	%
1888	1,853	51.60%	1,528	42.55%	210	5.85%
1892	1,750	47.17%	1,388	37.41%	572	15.42%
1896	2,115	50.18%	2,053	48.71%	47	1.12%
1900	2,235	54.81%	1,722	42.23%	121	2.97%
1904	2,276	60.92%	1,350	36.13%	110	2.94%
1908	2,161	57.55%	1,540	41.01%	54	1.44%
1912	1,187	32.31%	1,483	40.36%	1,004	27.33%
1916	2,069	54.74%	1,683	44.52%	28	0.74%
1920	4,168	62.32%	2,498	37.35%	22	0.33%
1924	3,545	58.66%	2,383	39.43%	115	1.90%
1928	4,167	65.82%	2,164	34.18%	0	0.00%
1932	2,688	47.35%	2,949	51.95%	40	0.70%
1936	3,792	55.66%	3,014	44.24%	7	0.10%
1940	3,976	59.23%	2,728	40.64%	9	0.13%
1944	3,384	62.75%	2,001	37.10%	8	0.15%
1948	2,687	57.46%	1,985	42.45%	4	0.09%
1952	3,755	66.83%	1,860	33.10%	4	0.07%
1956	3,216	62.51%	1,929	37.49%	0	0.00%
1960	3,115	64.21%	1,736	35.79%	0	0.00%
1964	2,125	46.20%	2,475	53.80%	0	0.00%
1968	2,631	57.81%	1,490	32.74%	430	9.45%
1972	3,167	72.01%	1,231	27.99%	0	0.00%
1976	2,094	49.47%	2,113	49.92%	26	0.61%
1980	2,551	60.36%	1,541	36.46%	134	3.17%
1984	2,678	65.96%	1,382	34.04%	0	0.00%
1988	2,074	54.38%	1,726	45.25%	14	0.37%
1992	1,295	31.94%	1,456	35.91%	1,304	32.16%
1996	1,464	42.21%	1,487	42.88%	517	14.91%
2000	2,220	57.66%	1,488	38.65%	142	3.69%
2004	2,593	60.75%	1,645	38.54%	30	0.70%
2008	2,654	58.15%	1,814	39.75%	96	2.10%
2012	2,721	65.30%	1,312	31.49%	134	3.22%
2016	3,232	74.95%	838	19.43%	242	5.61%
2020	3,725	79.56%	897	19.16%	60	1.28%
2024	3,771	80.18%	888	18.88%	44	0.94%

=== Missouri presidential preference primaries ===
==== 2020 ====
The 2020 presidential primaries for both the Democratic and Republican parties were held in Missouri on March 10. On the Democratic side, former Vice President Joe Biden (D-Delaware) both won statewide and carried Caldwell County by a wide margin. Biden went on to defeat President Donald Trump in the general election.

Missouri Democratic Presidential Primary – Caldwell County (2020)
Party	Candidate	Votes	%	±%
Democratic	Joe Biden	334	60.62	
Democratic	Bernie Sanders	158	28.68	
Democratic	Tulsi Gabbard	9	1.63	
Democratic	Others/Uncommitted	50	9.07	

Incumbent President Donald Trump (R-Florida) faced a primary challenge from former Massachusetts Governor Bill Weld, but won both Caldwell County and statewide by overwhelming margins.

Missouri Republican Presidential Primary – Caldwell County (2020)
Party	Candidate	Votes	%	±%
Republican	Donald Trump	692	97.06	
Republican	Bill Weld	8	1.12	
Republican	Others/Uncommitted	13	1.82	

==== 2016 ====
The 2016 presidential primaries for both the Republican and Democratic parties were held in Missouri on March 15. Businessman Donald Trump (R-New York) narrowly won the state overall, as well as a plurality of the vote in Caldwell County.

Missouri Republican Presidential Primary – Caldwell County (2016)
Party	Candidate	Votes	%	±%
Republican	Donald Trump	780	43.67	
Republican	Ted Cruz	701	39.25	
Republican	John Kasich	149	8.34	
Republican	Marco Rubio	96	5.38	
Republican	Others/Uncommitted	60	3.36	

On the Democratic side, former Secretary of State Hillary Clinton (D-New York) won statewide by a small margin, but lost Caldwell County to Senator Bernie Sanders (I-Vermont).

Missouri Democratic Presidential Primary – Caldwell County (2016)
Party	Candidate	Votes	%	±%
Democratic	Bernie Sanders	314	55.58	
Democratic	Hillary Clinton	244	43.19	
Democratic	Others/Uncommitted	7	1.24	

==== 2012 ====
The 2012 Missouri Republican Presidential Primary's results were nonbinding on the state's national convention delegates. Voters in Caldwell County supported former U.S. Senator Rick Santorum (R-Pennsylvania), who finished first in the state at large, but eventually lost the nomination to former Governor Mitt Romney (R-Massachusetts). Delegates to the congressional district and state conventions were chosen at a county caucus, which selected delegations favoring Romney.

==== 2008 ====
In 2008, the Missouri Republican Presidential Primary was closely contested, with Senator John McCain (R-Arizona) prevailing and eventually winning the nomination.

Missouri Republican Presidential Primary – Caldwell County (2008)
Party	Candidate	Votes	%	±%
Republican	John McCain	363	36.05	
Republican	Mike Huckabee	302	29.99	
Republican	Mitt Romney	242	24.03	
Republican	Ron Paul	77	7.65	
Republican	Others/Uncommitted	23	2.28	

Then-Senator Hillary Clinton (D-New York) received more votes than any candidate from either party in Caldwell County during the 2008 presidential primary. Despite initial reports that Clinton had won Missouri, Barack Obama (D-Illinois), also a Senator at the time, narrowly defeated her statewide and later became that year's Democratic nominee, going on to win the presidency.

Missouri Democratic Presidential Primary – Caldwell County (2008)
Party	Candidate	Votes	%	±%
Democratic	Hillary Clinton	616	59.40	
Democratic	Barack Obama	379	36.55	
Democratic	Others/Uncommitted	42	4.06	

== See also ==
- National Register of Historic Places listings in Caldwell County, Missouri

== Sources ==
- Booth, Bertha Ellis (1936). A Short History of Caldwell County. Hamilton, MO: Hamilton Public Schools. p. 23.
- Caldwell County, Missouri: A Peek in the Past. Vol. 1. Missouri: Caldwell County Historical Society. 1985.
- Hamer, John C. (Spring 2008). "Mapping Mormon Settlement in Caldwell County, Missouri" (PDF). Mormon Historical Studies. 9 (1): 15–38.
- History of Caldwell and Livingston Counties, Missouri. St. Louis: National Historical Company. 1886. p. 1227.
- Jensen, Andrew (January 1888). "Caldwell County, Missouri". The Historical Record. 8 (1): 685–723.
- Johnston, Carrie Polk; McGlumphy, W.H.S. (1923). History of Clinton and Caldwell Counties, Missouri. Topeka; Indianapolis: Historical Publishing Company. p. 836.
- LeSueur, Stephen C. (Fall 2005). "Missouri's Failed Compromise: The Creation of Caldwell County for the Mormons". Journal of Mormon History. 31 (3): 113–144.
- Walker, Jeffrey N. (2008). "Mormon Land Rights in Caldwell and Daviess Counties and the Mormon Conflict of 1838: New Findings and New Understandings". BYU Studies. 47 (1): 5–55. Archived from the original on July 24, 2011.
