= New York Township, Caldwell County, Missouri =

Township in Missouri, United States

New York Township
- Township
- Coordinates: 39°40′18″N 093°55′31″W
- Country: United States
- State: Missouri
- County: Caldwell

Area
  - Total: 36.10 sq mi (93.49 km^{2})
  - Land: 36.09 sq mi (93.47 km^{2})
  - Water: 0.0039 sq mi (0.01 km^{2}) 0.01%
- Elevation: 765 ft (233 m)

Population (2020)
  - Total: 266
  - Density: 7.3/sq mi (2.8/km^{2})
- FIPS code: 29-52400
- GNIS feature ID: 0766368

New York Township is one of twelve townships in Caldwell County, Missouri, and is part of the Kansas City metropolitan area with the United States. As of the 2020 census, its population was 266.

== History ==
New York Township was organized on November 4th, 1869, and was called Grand River Township; its name was changed to the present on December 30th, 1869.

== Geography ==
New York Township covers an area of 36.09 square miles (93.5 km^{2}) and contains no incorporated settlements.

The streams of Brush Creek, Cottonwood Creek, Crabapple Creek, Little Otter Creek, Otter Creek and Tom Creek run through this township.
