= Breckenridge Township, Caldwell County, Missouri =

Township in the US state of Missouri

Breckenridge Township
- Township
- Coordinates: 39°45′20″N 093°48′15″W
- Country: United States
- State: Missouri
- County: Caldwell

Area
  - Total: 35.39 sq mi (91.66 km^{2})
  - Land: 35.35 sq mi (91.56 km^{2})
  - Water: 0.039 sq mi (0.1 km^{2}) 0.11%
- Elevation: 846 ft (258 m)

Population (2000)
  - Total: 627
  - Density: 18/sq mi (6.8/km^{2})
- FIPS code: 29-08146
- GNIS feature ID: 0766358

Breckenridge Township is one of twelve townships in Caldwell County, Missouri, and is part of the Kansas City metropolitan area with the USA. As of the 2000 census, its population was 627.

== History ==
Breckenridge Township was organized November 4th, 1869.

== Geography ==
Breckenridge Township covers an area of 35.39 square miles (91.7 km^{2}) and contains one incorporated settlement, Breckenridge.

A hamlet called Grand River existed in Breckenridge Township and consisted of a store and post office; when Breckenridge, the city, was platted, Grand River dissipated.
