= Bonanza, Missouri =

Extinct hamlet in Missouri, U.S.

Coordinates: 39°38′39″N 93°58′22″W

Bonanza is an extinct hamlet in central Caldwell County, in the U.S. state of Missouri.

== History ==
A post office called Bonanza was established in November 2nd, 1881, by Manford F. Kern, and remained in operation until October 31st, 1903. Bonanza is a name derived from the Spanish language.

== Geography ==
The town was settled along Shoal Creek and just southwest of its former location is Bonanza Conservation Area.
