= Gould Farm, Missouri =

Unincorporated community in Missouri, U.S.

Coordinates: 39°39′22″N 93°54′07″W

Gould Farm is an unincorporated community in Caldwell County, in the U.S. state of Missouri.

== History ==
A post office called Gould Farm was established in 1876, and remained in operation until 1905. The community was named for C. L. Gould, the original owner of the town site.
