= Kettle Creek (Missouri) =

Stream in the American state of Missouri

Coordinates: 39.7997322°N 93.8610508°W

Kettle Creek is a stream in Caldwell and Daviess County in the U.S. state of Missouri.

According to tradition, Kettle Creek was named on account of a party leaving a kettle along its course.

== See also ==
- List of rivers of Missouri
