= Kingston Township, Caldwell County, Missouri =

Township in the US state of Missouri

Kingston Township
- Township
- Coordinates: 39°39′08″N 094°02′22″W
- Country: United States
- State: Missouri
- County: Caldwell

Area
  - Total: 35.2 sq mi (91.2 km^{2})
  - Land: 35.2 sq mi (91.2 km^{2})
  - Water: 0 sq mi (0 km^{2}) 0%
- Elevation: 807 ft (246 m)

Population (2000)
  - Total: 543
  - Density: 16/sq mi (6/km^{2})
- FIPS code: 29-38864
- GNIS feature ID: 0766365

Kingston Township is one of twelve townships in Caldwell County, Missouri, and is part of the Kansas City metropolitan area with the USA. As of the 2000 census, its population was 543.

== History ==
Kingston Township was organized on November 4th, 1867, and was created out of the now defunct, Blythe Township. The first settlements in the county were in this township.

== Geography ==
Kingston Township covers an area of 35.21 square miles (91.2 km^{2}) and contains one incorporated settlement, Kingston (the county seat). It contains two cemeteries: Brown and Dustin.

The first hamlet in Caldwell County was Salem, which was located near the mouth of Log Creek two miles southeast of Kingston. The village was named after the Hebrew word for "peace". When Kingston was formed in 1843, the county seat moved there, and Salem was abandoned. Nothing is left to mark the site.

The streams of Goose Creek, Jim Creek, Log Creek, Long Creek, Mill Creek, and Tub Creek run through this township.
