= Tinney Grove, Missouri =

Unincorporated community in Missouri, U.S.

Coordinates: 39°30′15″N 93°48′16″W

Tinney Grove is an unincorporated community in northeast Ray County, in the U.S. state of Missouri. It is part of the Kansas City metropolitan area.

The community is on Missouri Route A approximately five miles south of Braymer in adjacent Caldwell County. It is approximately seventeen miles northeast of Richmond.

== History ==
The first settlement at Tinney Grove was made in 1840 by Nathan Tinney, for whom the community was named. A post office called Tinneys Grove was established in 1841, and remained in operation until 1904.
