= Cowgill, Missouri =

- City
- Location of Cowgill, Missouri
- Coordinates: 39°33′37″N 93°55′34″W
- Country: United States
- State: Missouri
- County: Caldwell

Area
  - Total: 0.24 sq mi (0.62 km^{2})
  - Land: 0.24 sq mi (0.62 km^{2})
  - Water: 0 sq mi (0.00 km^{2})
- Elevation: 974 ft (297 m)

Population (2020)
  - Total: 168
  - Density: 702.7/sq mi (271.33/km^{2})
- Time zone: UTC-6 (Central (CST))
  - Summer (DST): UTC-5 (CDT)
- ZIP code: 64637
- Area code: 660
- FIPS code: 29-16984
- GNIS feature ID: 2393657

Cowgill is a city in southern Caldwell County, Missouri, and is part of the Kansas City metropolitan area with the United States. The population was 168 at the 2020 census.

== History ==
Cowgill was laid out in 1887 by Milwaukee Land Company along the Chicago, Milwaukee, & St. Paul Railroad. The community was named for James Cowgill, who lived in the area.

== Geography ==
Cowgill is located on Missouri Route B just south of Missouri Route 116 between Polo six miles to the west and Braymer seven miles to the east-northeast.

According to the United States Census Bureau, the city has a total area of 0.24 square miles (0.62 km^{2}), all land.

== Demographics ==
Historical population
Census	Pop.	Note	%±
1900	357		—
1910	363		1.7%
1920	381		5.0%
1930	368		−3.4%
1940	338		−8.2%
1950	241		−28.7%
1960	259		7.5%
1970	232		−10.4%
1980	267		15.1%
1990	257		−3.7%
2000	247		−3.9%
2010	188		−23.9%
2020	168		−10.6%
U.S. Decennial Census

=== 2010 census ===
As of the census of 2010, there were 188 people, 82 households, and 49 families residing in the city. The population density was 783.3 inhabitants per square mile (302.4/km^{2}). There were 103 housing units at an average density of 429.2 units per square mile (165.7 units/km^{2}). The racial makeup of the city was 95.7% White, 0.5% African American, 0.5% Asian, 2.7% from other races, and 0.5% from two or more races. Hispanic or Latino of any race were 3.2% of the population.

There were 82 households, of which 29.3% had children under the age of 18 living with them, 41.5% were married couples living together, 11.0% had a female householder with no husband present, 7.3% had a male householder with no wife present, and 40.2% were non-families. 31.7% of all households were made up of individuals, and 14.6% had someone living alone who was 65 years of age or older. The average household size was 2.29 and the average family size was 2.92.

The median age in the city was 39 years. 23.4% of residents were under the age of 18; 8% were between the ages of 18 and 24; 25.5% were from 25 to 44; 23.4% were from 45 to 64; and 19.7% were 65 years of age or older. The gender makeup of the city was 50.5% male and 49.5% female.

=== 2000 census ===
As of the census of 2000, there were 247 people, 96 households, and 64 families residing in the city. The population density was 1,060.7 inhabitants per square mile (409.5/km^{2}). There were 113 housing units at an average density of 485.2 units per square mile (187.3 units/km^{2}). The racial makeup of the city was 97.57% White, 0.40% African American, 1.21% from other races, and 0.81% from two or more races.

There were 96 households, out of which 31.3% had children under the age of 18 living with them, 58.3% were married couples living together, 8.3% had a female householder with no husband present, and 32.3% were non-families. 30.2% of all households were made up of individuals, and 15.6% had someone living alone who was 65 years of age or older. The average household size was 2.57 and the average family size was 3.26.

In the city the population was spread out, with 30.0% under the age of 18, 5.3% from 18 to 24, 26.7% from 25 to 44, 22.3% from 45 to 64, and 15.8% who were 65 years of age or older. The median age was 34 years. For every 100 females, there were 114.8 males. For every 100 females age 18 and over, there were 96.6 males.

The median income for a household in the city was $21,563, and the median income for a family was $24,444. Males had a median income of $28,125 versus $28,125 for females. The per capita income for the city was $11,356. About 21.2% of families and 21.9% of the population were below the poverty line, including 25.0% of those under the age of eighteen and 12.8% of those 65 or over.

== Education ==
It is in the Cowgill R-VI School District, an elementary school district.

== Notable people ==
- Herb Conyers, former professional baseball player for the Cleveland Indians
- Glen Lukens, prominent Western ceramics artist
