= Grant Township, Caldwell County, Missouri =

Township in the US state of Missouri

Grant Township
- Township
- Coordinates: 39°33′36″N 094°02′26″W
- Country: United States
- State: Missouri
- County: Caldwell

Area
  - Total: 36.15 sq mi (93.62 km^{2})
  - Land: 36.15 sq mi (93.62 km^{2})
  - Water: 0 sq mi (0 km^{2}) 0%
- Elevation: 988 ft (301 m)

Population (2000)
  - Total: 1,224
  - Density: 34/sq mi (13.1/km^{2})
- FIPS code: 29-28396
- GNIS feature ID: 0766362

Grant Township is one of twelve townships in Caldwell County, Missouri, and is part of the Kansas City metropolitan area with the USA. As of the 2000 census, its population was 1,224.

== History ==
Grant Township was established on May 4th, 1870, and named after Ulysses S. Grant, 18th President of the United States. It was formerly part of Blythe Township.

== Geography ==
Grant Township covers an area of 36.15 square miles (93.6 km^{2}) and contains one incorporated settlement, Polo. It contains five cemeteries: Dixon, Dunkard, Estes, Wiley, and Zimmerman.
