= Hawn's Mill massacre =

Massacre of Mormons at Caldwell County, Missouri, US

Hawn's Mill Massacre
- Part of the 1838 Mormon War
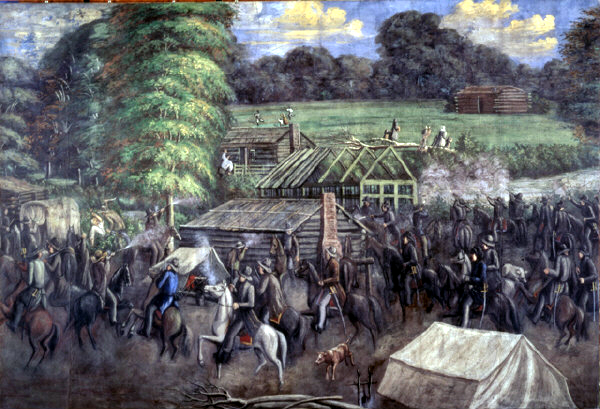
- "Haun's Mill" by C.C.A. Christensen
- Location: 39.670241°N 93.839035°W; Fairview township in eastern Caldwell County, Missouri
- Date: October 30, 1838; 188 years ago About 4 p.m.
- Target: Mormons
- Weapons: Muskets and rifles
- Deaths: 17 Mormons
- Injuries: 15, plus 4 of the attackers
- Perpetrators: ~240 Livingston County, Missouri Regulators, Missouri State militiamen, and anti-Mormon volunteers

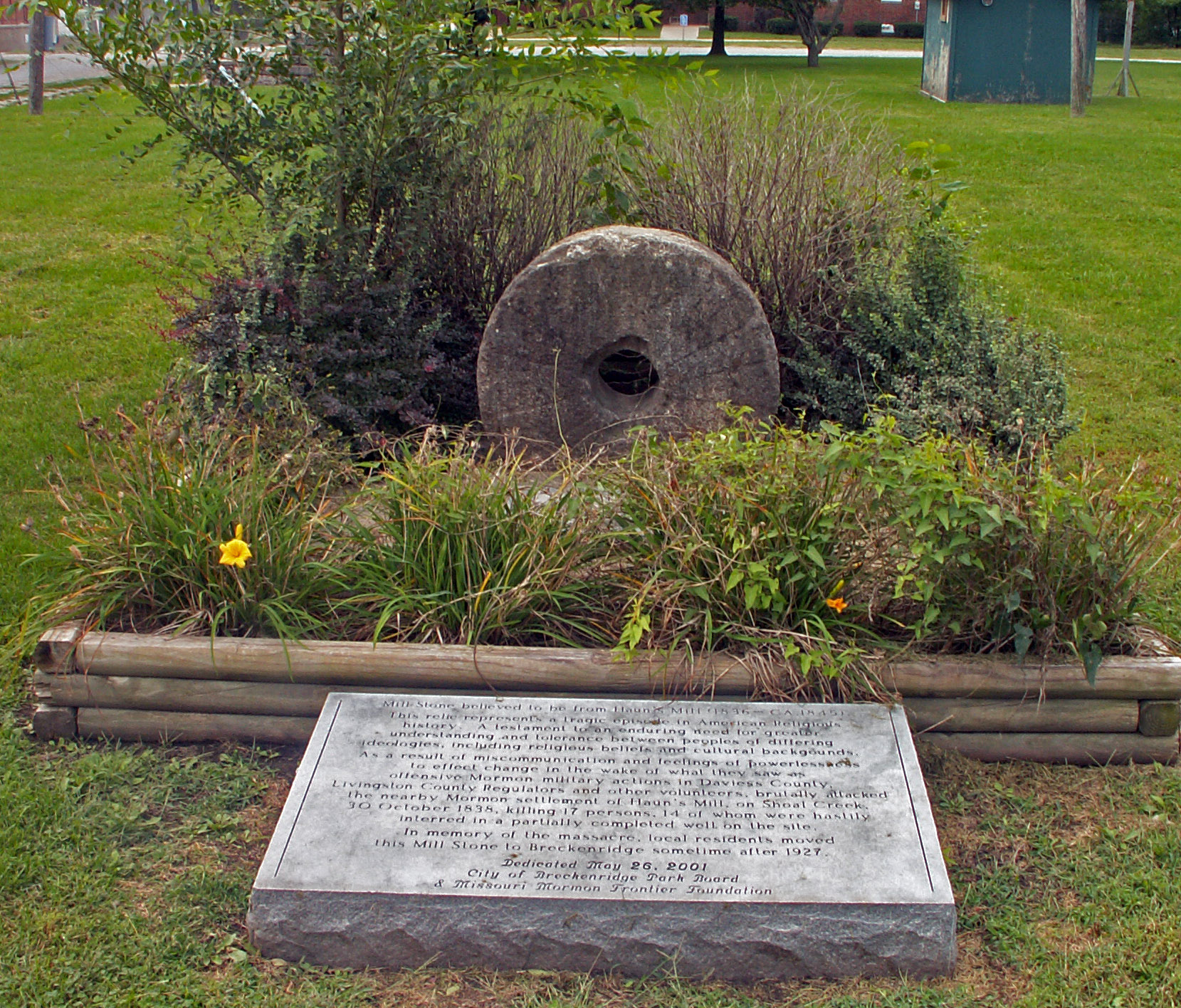
The Haun’s Mill stone is now in Breckenridge, Missouri

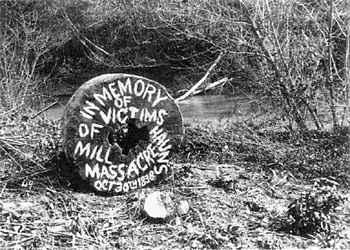
A millstone shortly after being recovered

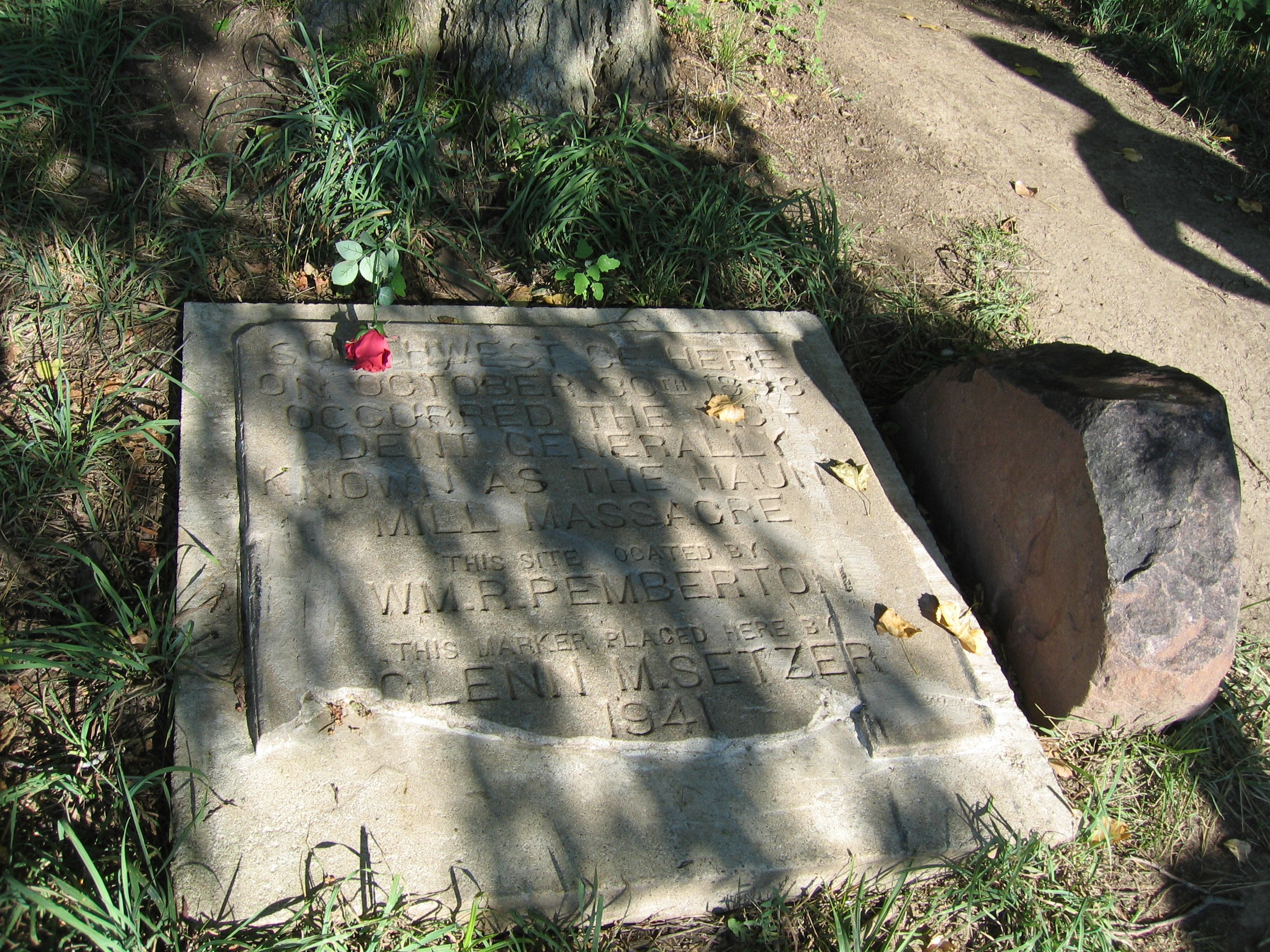
This marker and the red millstone were intended to mark the well where the victims were buried. In 1941 the landowner moved them, unaware that he had moved the marker from over the burial point. The exact location of the well is now not known.

The Hawn’s Mill Massacre (also Haun’s Mill Massacre) occurred on October 30, 1838, when a mob and militia unit from Livingston County, Missouri, attacked a Mormon settlement in eastern Caldwell County, Missouri, after the Battle of Crooked River. By far the bloodiest event in the 1838 Mormon War in Missouri, it has long been remembered by the members of the Latter Day Saint movement. While the spelling "Haun" is common when referring to the massacre or the mill where it occurred, the mill's owner used the spelling "Hawn" in legal documents.

== Hawn's Mill ==
Hawn's Mill was a mill established on the banks of Shoal Creek in Fairview Township, Caldwell County, Missouri in 1835–1836 by Jacob Hawn. Hawn was the son of German emigrants to Canada, who resettled in New York, where Jacob was born. While Jacob moved to Missouri and founded the mill around the same time as the Mormon migration to Missouri, he was not a Mormon. However, by October 1838 there were approximately 75 Mormon families living along the banks of Shoal Creek, about 30 of them in the immediate vicinity of Hawn's Mill and the James Houston blacksmith shop.

== Missouri militia ==
The unauthorized militia involved in the massacre was led overall by Colonel Thomas Jennings, of Livingston County with William O. Jennings (Sheriff of Livingston County), Nehemiah Comstock, and William Gee as captains of the three companies. At the time of the attack, the militia consisted of 240 men from Daviess, Livingston, Ray, Carroll and Chariton counties, as well as prominent men like Major Daniel Ashby of the Missouri state legislature and Thomas R. Bryan, Clerk of Livingston County.

Although the massacre took place a few days after Missouri's governor, Lilburn Boggs, issued his infamous Missouri Executive Order 44 ("Extermination Order" of 1838) there is debate as to whether the participants in the massacre knew of it. Hyrum Smith reported in the church's archives that Captain Comstock, who previously had assured the Mormons at the mill of their safety, had returned the next day attacking them, saying he had received an order from Governor Boggs via Colonel Ashley. However, historian William G. Hartley opined the local militia likely had not yet received news of this specific executive order, but rather the militia responded to the open hostility to Mormons that was already prevalent in Missouri, even before the order was published.

Militia member and state legislator Major Daniel Ashby stated in the Missouri House of Representatives that reports from Mormon dissenters led to the attack of Hawn's Mill. Those Hawn's Mill settlement dissenters were Robert White, George Miller, and Sardis Smith.

Shortly before the massacre, anti-Mormon raiders confiscated guns and weapons from Mormon settlers and immigrants. Some of those living in the surrounding area gathered at Hawn's Mill for safety.

== Truce ==
The threat posed by the growing strength and animosity of the Missouri militia caused considerable concern among the Mormon settlers at Hawn's Mill. They held a council on Sunday, October 28 and decided to organize a defensive force. Thirty-six men were armed and held in readiness against an attack. During the council meeting, a delayed group of about ten Mormon emigrant families from Kirtland Camp arrived at the settlement and camped near the blacksmith shop. That evening, one of the militia groups sent a representative who negotiated a truce with the settlers. Monday the 29th and most of Tuesday the 30th passed without incident.

== Massacre ==
On October 30 at approximately 4 p.m., the militia rode into the community. David Evans, a leader in the community, ran towards the militia, waving his hat and calling for peace. Alerted to the militia's approach, most of the Latter-day Saint women and children fled into the woods to the south, while most of the men headed to the blacksmith shop. The building was a particularly vulnerable structure as the widely-spaced logs enabled the attackers to fire inside. The shop became a deathtrap, since the militia gave no quarter, discharging about 100 rifles into the building. Grand River Township Justice of the Peace Thomas McBride, wounded while escaping the blacksmith shop, surrendered his gun to Jacob S Rogers Jr., who shot him and then hacked his body with a corn knife (scythe blade). According to their own account, they fired seven rounds making upwards of 1,600 shots during the attack of Hawn's Mill. The attack lasted 30 to 60 minutes.

After the initial attack, several of those who had been wounded or had surrendered were shot dead. Members of the militia entered the shop and found 10-year-old Sardius Smith, 7-year-old Alma Smith (sons of Amanda Barnes Smith), and 9-year-old Charles Merrick hiding under the blacksmith's bellows. Alma and Charles were shot (Charles later died), and a militia man known as "Glaze, of Carroll county", killed Sardius when he "put his musket against Sardius's skull and blew off the top of his head." Later, a William Reynolds would justify the killing by saying, "Nits will make lice, and if he had lived he would have become a Mormon." William Champlin who was "playing possum" heard the conversations, was discovered, held captive a few days, then released.

Several other bodies were mutilated, while many women were assaulted. Houses were robbed, wagons, tents, and clothing were stolen, and horses and livestock were driven off, leaving the surviving women and children destitute.

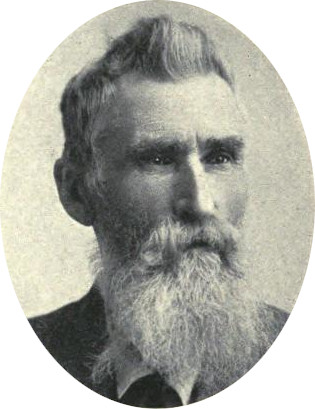
Massacre survivor Jacob Foutz lived another 10 years and died in Utah in 1848

As a result of the massacre 17 Mormons died: Hiram Abbott (25), Elias Benner (43), John Byers, Alexander Campbell, Simon Cox, Josiah Fuller (35), Austin Hammer (34), John Lee, Benjamin Lewis (35), Thomas McBride (62), Charles Merrick (9), Levi Merrick (30), William Napier (43), George S. Richards (15), Sardius Smith (10), Warren Smith (44), and John York (62). Fifteen more had been injured: Jacob Foutz (38), Jacob Hawn (34), Charles Jameson (35), Nathan K. Knight (36), Isaac Leany (24), Tarlton Lewis (33), Gilmon Merrill (30), George Myers (29), Jacob Myers Jr.(23), Jacob Potts (25), Hiram Rathbun, Alma Smith (7), Mary Stedwell, John Walker (44), and William Yokum (33). There were a few uninjured men, including William Champlin (44), Ellis Eames (48), Rial Eames (25), David Lewis (24), and David Evans (34).

The next morning, fourteen of the dead were slid from a plank into a large unfinished dry well and covered with straw and a thin layer of dirt. Benjamin Lewis (33), originally buried on the David Lewis farm, was later exhumed and moved to a local cemetery; Charles Merrick (9) died later and was buried elsewhere; and Hiram Abbott (25) was later removed to his father's place where he died.

Four of the 240 militiamen were wounded, but none fatally. John Hart, a Livingston resident, was wounded in the arm. John Renfrow had his thumb shot off. Allen England, a citizen of Daviess, was severely wounded in the thigh. Jacob S. Rogers Jr., a Daviess resident, was shot in the hip by Nathan Kinsman Knight.

== Aftermath ==
After the massacre, Philo Dibble stated that "Brother Joseph had sent word by Hawn, who owned the mill, to inform the brethren who were living there to leave and come to Far West, but Mr. Hawn did not deliver the message."

David Lewis relates "Although we had been counseled by Joseph the Prophet to leave the mill and go to Far West, but being deceived by the messenger we sent him for council, we understood it not, for our messenger said to Joseph what shall we do that is at the mill, Joseph said gather up all of you and come to Far West. "What?" said the messenger, whose name was Jacob Hawn, the owner of mill, "leave the mill and let it be burnt down? We think we can maintain it." "If you maintain it" said Joseph, "you will do well do as you please." The messenger returned and said if we thought we could maintain the mill it was Joseph's council for us to do it, if we thought not, to come to Far West and we thought from the way the thing was represented it would be like cowards to leave and not try to maintain it, and as they agreed to be at peace we thought to gather up our houses would be useless, for we did not know that it was Joseph's decided council for us to do so . . ."

It appears that Hawn had received Joseph Smith's direction to relocate to Far West but did not convey this direction to any of the others at Hawn's Mill. Of the matter, Smith recorded, "Up to this day God had given me wisdom to save the people who took counsel. None had ever been killed who abode by my counsel." Then he recorded that innocent lives could have been saved at Hawn's Mill had his counsel been received and followed.

"For I am the Lord your God, and will save all those of your brethren who have been pure in heart, and have been slain in the land of Missouri, saith the Lord."

Captain Nehemiah Comstock's contingent of Livingston militia occupied the mill for nearly three weeks harassing and plundering the Mormons. Life during the winter of 1838–1839 became essentially that of day-to-day survival. Most of the families banded together until they could make arrangements to move along with the rest of the Saints to Illinois. Non-Mormon Harrison Severe, who had refused to join the mob, left with the Mormons. By the end of February 1839, all of the Mormons had left. Jacob Hawn moved to Oregon and became a pioneer settler of Yamhill County.

As this and other confrontations unfolded between Mormons and the people in the state of Missouri, Mormons appealed for redress from the federal government, accusing the state of Missouri of complicity in violence against Mormons for the state's failure to investigate or prosecute those involved.

In 1941, Mr. P.E. Gastineau of Cowgill, Missouri, owner of the land, gave permission for Mr. Glenn Setzer, ex-county official, to place a commemorative marker, and hold a program on July 13.

Until 2012, the grounds of the massacre were maintained as a historic site by Community of Christ. In May 2012, it was announced that The Church of Jesus Christ of Latter-day Saints had acquired the property and the Far West burying ground from Community of Christ.

== Portrayal in art, entertainment, and media ==
The Hawn's Mill Massacre was dramatized in the 1977 American film Brigham a biopic of American religious figure Brigham Young, directed by Tom McGowan from a script by Philip Yordan. It was also depicted in the Latter-day Saint film Legacy: A Mormon Journey (1993), as well as in the Hulu series, Under the Banner of Heaven (2022).

== See also ==
- Fountain Green massacre
- Latter Day Saint martyrs
- List of massacres in the United States
- Missouri Executive Order 44
- Mountain Meadows Massacre
- Salt Creek Canyon massacre
- Utah War
