= Rockford Township, Caldwell County, Missouri =

Township in the US state of Missouri

Rockford Township
- Township
- Coordinates: 39°34′18″N 094°09′22″W
- Country: United States
- State: Missouri
- County: Caldwell

Area
  - Total: 35.8 sq mi (92.6 km^{2})
  - Land: 35.72 sq mi (92.52 km^{2})
  - Water: 0.031 sq mi (0.08 km^{2}) 0.09%
- Elevation: 1,033 ft (315 m)

Population (2000)
  - Total: 478
  - Density: 13/sq mi (5.2/km^{2})
- FIPS code: 29-62624
- GNIS feature ID: 766369

Rockford Township is one of twelve townships in Caldwell County, Missouri, and is part of the Kansas City metropolitan area with the USA. As of the 2000 census, its population was 478.

== History ==
Rockford Township was one of the four original townships and was organized in 1860. In May 1867, the boundaries were changed, and then in May 1870, the boundaries were changed to their present limits. Rockford Township was named for a rocky ford over Crooked River. It is here the Mormons crossed into Caldwell County from Clay County.

== Geography ==
Rockford Township covers an area of 35.75 square miles (92.6 km^{2}) and contains no incorporated settlements. It contains four cemeteries: Cates, Mayes, Sloan, and Zeikle.

The streams of Brushy Creek, Crooked River, Spring Branch, and Stevenson Creek run through this township.

== Transportation ==
Rockford Township contains one airport or landing strip, Mayes Homestead Airport.
