= Mormon settlement techniques of the Salt Lake Valley =

Western U.S. Mormon expansion

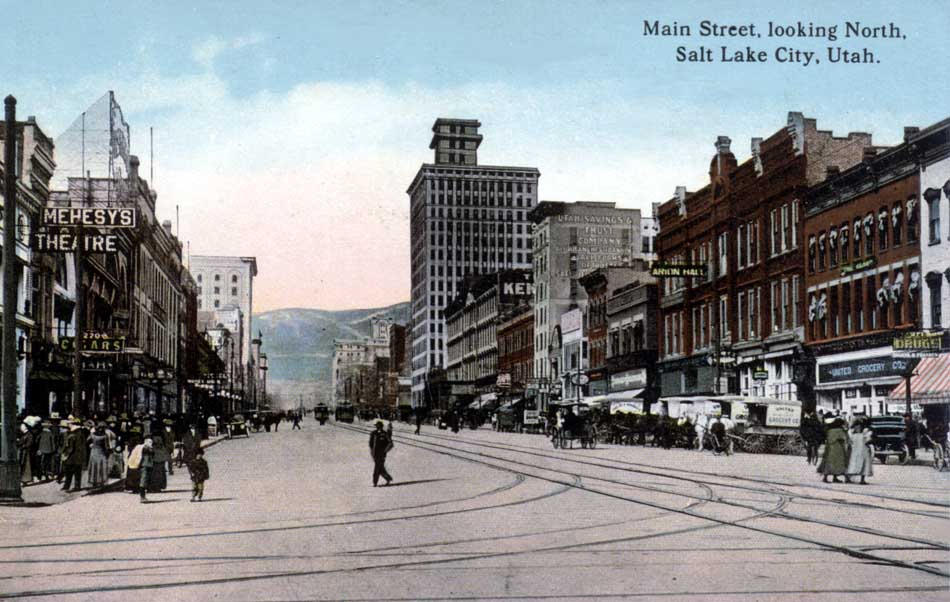
Salt Lake City, Utah, United States, c. 1900

The settlement of the Church of Jesus Christ of Latter-day Saints (LDS Church) in the Salt Lake Valley and surrounding area was achieved through moving from settlement to settlement until they made a permanent home in the Great Basin of the Rocky Mountains. In 1847, they trekked en masse across the great plains of the United States until they reached what is now northern Utah. The setting of establishment was led by Brigham Young. The church organized and directed the efforts. It is "the planning and founding of more than 500 communities in the American West, [and it] is regarded by many planning historians as one of the most significant accomplishments in the history of American city development".

The presence of the Saints in the valley led to the efforts of a transcontinental railroad in which Promontory, Utah, served as the connecting point of the Union Pacific and Central Pacific lines. Often labeled "the Crossroads of the West", this area became important for people traveling west, particularly for the California Gold Rush. They used techniques of farm villages, plats, and the grid for the initial establishment and at the uninhabited area. Industrialization progressed rapidly through mining, manufacturing, and the establishment of railroads. Salt Lake City, the city where the headquarters of the LDS Church is located, became successful.

== Roots of settlement ==
The Church of Christ was the name of the original church founded by Joseph Smith in New York in 1830. Many of the early members, like Smith, came from the American northeast and therefore had been raised using the agricultural and organizational methods common to the area. Persecution, including mob violence, against church members caused Smith and his followers to move from place to place, building communities wherever they went. Smith intended to establish Zion.

Smith's "City of Zion" was based on a self-sufficient agrarian model. In his plan, the city was to be divided so that each family had a 1/2-acre city lot to build their home and plant a garden, with one square mile of barns and crop fields surrounding the city for provisions. The saints began building in Kirtland, Ohio, and parts of Missouri, such as Jackson County and Far West, then moved their headquarters to Nauvoo, Illinois. Later, since they confronted the assassination of Joseph Smith, the Saints decided to leave once more. They migrated from the Midwest to the Salt Lake Valley under the leadership of their new leader, Brigham Young.

== Central institution ==
The driving force in the settlement of the Salt Lake Valley was the LDS Church, with most people living there being church members. This group was familiar with establishing towns, where they all lived and worked together, and promoted the concept of Zion. Mormon settlers were motivated by religion. Since its earliest days, missionary work had been a prominent responsibility of the church and its members. Proselyting efforts to gain more followers and bring them to Zion played a critical role in the immigration to Utah, which provided manpower for settlement. The Perpetual Emigration Fund was established to finance the travels of converts to Utah. Young had envisioned that the "desert blossom as a rose".

=== Theodemocracy ===
A Theodemocracy was instituted, combining church and state. The church is organized with a lay ministry, beginning with the president and his counselors, who form the First Presidency and who have oversight for all areas, the Quorum of the Twelve Apostles and other general authorities, who are assigned responsibility over specified areas, then local leaders of stakes and wards. There were also tribunals that acted as basic court systems, however, there were no lawyers. The influx of non-Mormons, as well as a desire to obtain statehood, prompted the church to re-evaluate its system. The Saints proposed the State of Deseret, with all three branches of government: legislative, judiciary, and executive. Instead, the Territory of Utah was formed by an act of Congress in 1850, with Brigham Young as governor. The church's leaders taught their people that they were establishing the Kingdom of God upon the earth. The leadership of the LDS Church in Utah under Young has been described as "a completely organized and efficient ecclesiastical machine".

=== Brigham Young ===
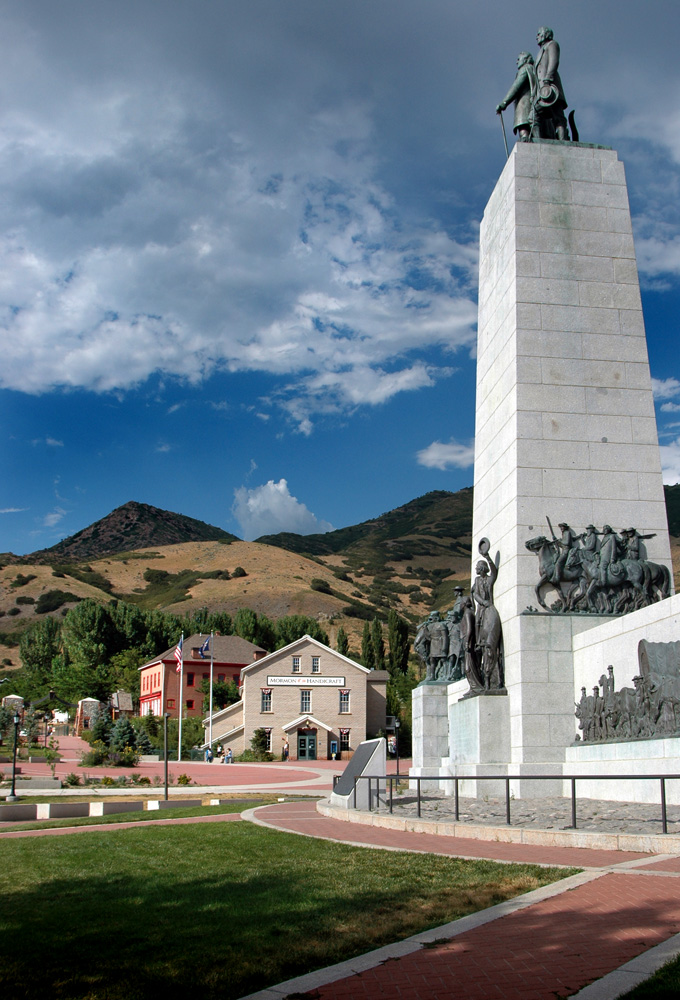
The Place Monument in Salt Lake City

Under Brigham Young's direction, Salt Lake City was constructed to be the headquarters, while other areas were developed under his direction. Young has been characterized as a skilled leader, with contrasting personality and ability from the church's founder, Joseph Smith. "Young inspired his followers by his down-to-earth demeanor and through his skills as a pragmatic organizer and executive."

Upon viewing the Salt Lake Valley, Young declared: "This is the place". This declaration designated the new place that they would begin to settle and develop. Young assigned the task of surveying the immediate area to plan a new settlement to Orson Pratt, who was assisted by Henry G. Sherwood, and conducted the original survey of Salt Lake City, on August 2, 1847. After beginning the first settlement, Young sent parties of explorers to search the rest of the Salt Lake Valley. These parties included men like Albert Carrington, who was sent to the southern part of the valley, and Jesse Little, who was sent to the northern part. After receiving reports from the explorers, Young directed clergymen and craftsmen to be sent in settlement groups to specified locations. These men extended a church calling. Young would then continually follow up and supervise their efforts through personal visits, often being highly critical of his findings. Young thought that isolation and demand for hard work would be character building for his people and that the Salt Lake Valley possessed the ideal qualities.

== Settlement ==
=== Beginnings ===
The Intermountain West was "drier and colder" and "less accessible", making the geographical differences from the Mississippi River Valley, their former home, quite profound. The Salt Lake Valley is between the Wasatch Mountains on the east, the Oquirrh Mountains on the west, Traverse Ridge to the south, and the Great Salt Lake to the northwest. The church leaders' assessment of the area was "based on the reports of trappers, explorers, and erstwhile immigrant recruiters trying to attract settlers to the Oregon or California territories". Lansford Hastings said that the area "offers inducements to no civilized people, sufficient to justify an expectation of permanent settlements", but John Fremont's more favorable report inspired the church leaders to select the Salt Lake Valley as their destination.

The group arrived late in the season, which necessitated a rush to plant crops such as potatoes and corn to meet their needs for the coming winter and provide seeds for the following spring. Jim Bridger had told the newcomers that nothing would ever grow in the Salt Lake Valley, mainly because the ground was so hard. The ground broke some of the pioneers' plows. In order to soften the ground, the pioneers built a dam in nearby City Creek to flood the ground, which was successful. Some of the Saints had learned irrigation techniques while serving missions in places such as Italy. They acclimated to the harsh winter during the first year. The settlers survived the first ten years of settlement, which including harsh winds, rains, snows, frosts, and insect pests.

=== Salt Lake City ===
The headquarters for the church had been determined by Young. The surrounding area underwent immediate planning; it would serve as the center of their new city. One of the first buildings was "the bowery", which was a simple structure designed to be a temporary facility for worship and school. A fence was built, encompassing the city center, in order to provide protection from Indians and the cold winter winds. Inside of the fence, log homes and adobes were constructed for housing. A school was built but without desks, chairs, or other supplies. Later the Saints built tables from wagon parts and windows from cloth, which had been used and stretched into form. Salt Lake city was a planned settlement and a planning map was created before any street or building was constructed, now available in the Library of Congress.

=== Other areas ===
Bountiful, named after an ancient American city referenced in the Book of Mormon, was the second settlement. Shortly after the pioneers' arrival, Perrigrine Sessions was sent by Young to explore the area just north of Salt Lake City. In September 1847 Sessions gathered his family into their wagon and herded 300 head of cattle into the South Davis Valley. Other families moved into the area and began planting crops the following year. Fifty-three families had established farms in the area by 1850. Tribes such as the Utes and Shoshone occupied parts of the Great Basin. The ever-expanding settlement of the Saints pushed the Indians from their fertile lands. While the Saints did offer some food to help compensate, continual encroachment on their land caused conflict that led to some violence between the two groups. Eventually many of the Indians were forced to leave for reservations and other lands.

==== 49ers ====
Around the same time that the Saints began to settle the Salt Lake Valley, word had spread throughout the United States that gold had been discovered in California. Following the winter, many fortune hunters, or 49ers, started to head west to join in the gold rush. On their journey west, a fair number of these people detoured from the popular path and went through Salt Lake City. This route was not the quickest to California, but they looked to Salt Lake City as a place to rest and stock up on supplies. During this time the settlers in the valley were struggling. The city was still being established, only having about 6,000 residents, and the people had barely survived two disastrous harvests due to drought, frost, and cricket infestation.

The original settlers and the 49ers mutually benefited from each other. The Mormons received outside supplies, i.e. consumer goods and farm implements, and the 49ers received critical aid during their rest stop in the valley. The relationship between the two was generally positive, despite some accounts of conflict. Many of the members brought back large amounts of gold dust. The gold was used to mint gold coins, which the church used for financing and to establish the Deseret Mint until paper currency was issued. The 1849 Gold Rush brought economic development to the valley and established patterns for future travel to the west coast. When the planning of the Transcontinental Railroad was laid out, experts chose the route through the valley, which helped make Salt Lake City a base for later mercantile and exploration efforts.

=== Techniques ===
Settlement in the Salt Lake Valley followed Young's modified version of Smith's "City of Zion". Young followed this plan in the Salt Lake Valley instead of following the common methods used in other parts of the western United States. Settlement tactics included three main traits: the plat, the grid, and the farm village.

==== The plat ====
Panorama of Salt Lake City in 1867 Represents the agricultural green belts on the fringe of the city

The plat was the central concept, which was the organization of farming and commercial activities surrounding the community center. As stated in a Church News article: "The Mormon communities were agriculturally sustainable. They were laid out in a grid of 10-acre blocks, with a community center containing cultural, school, religious and commercial activities. Farming was conducted in surrounding greenbelts outside the city. The plat provided for neighborhood structure (wards), modern zoning (separation of incompatible uses), and land use regulations (residences set back from the street with a fine, well-maintained garden, or grove in the front yard)."

==== The grid ====
The grid, defined as a network of squares formed by perpendicular lines, is the second organizing structure. The Latter-day Saint settlers created a city where the center was the temple. Brigham Young felt that the streets of Salt Lake needed to be large enough to allow a horse-drawn wagon to turn around.

The more rural areas followed a slightly modified method of the plat. The farming activities were often located in the center of the city with all other buildings. Thus the separation, or zoning, of various activities was less distinct.

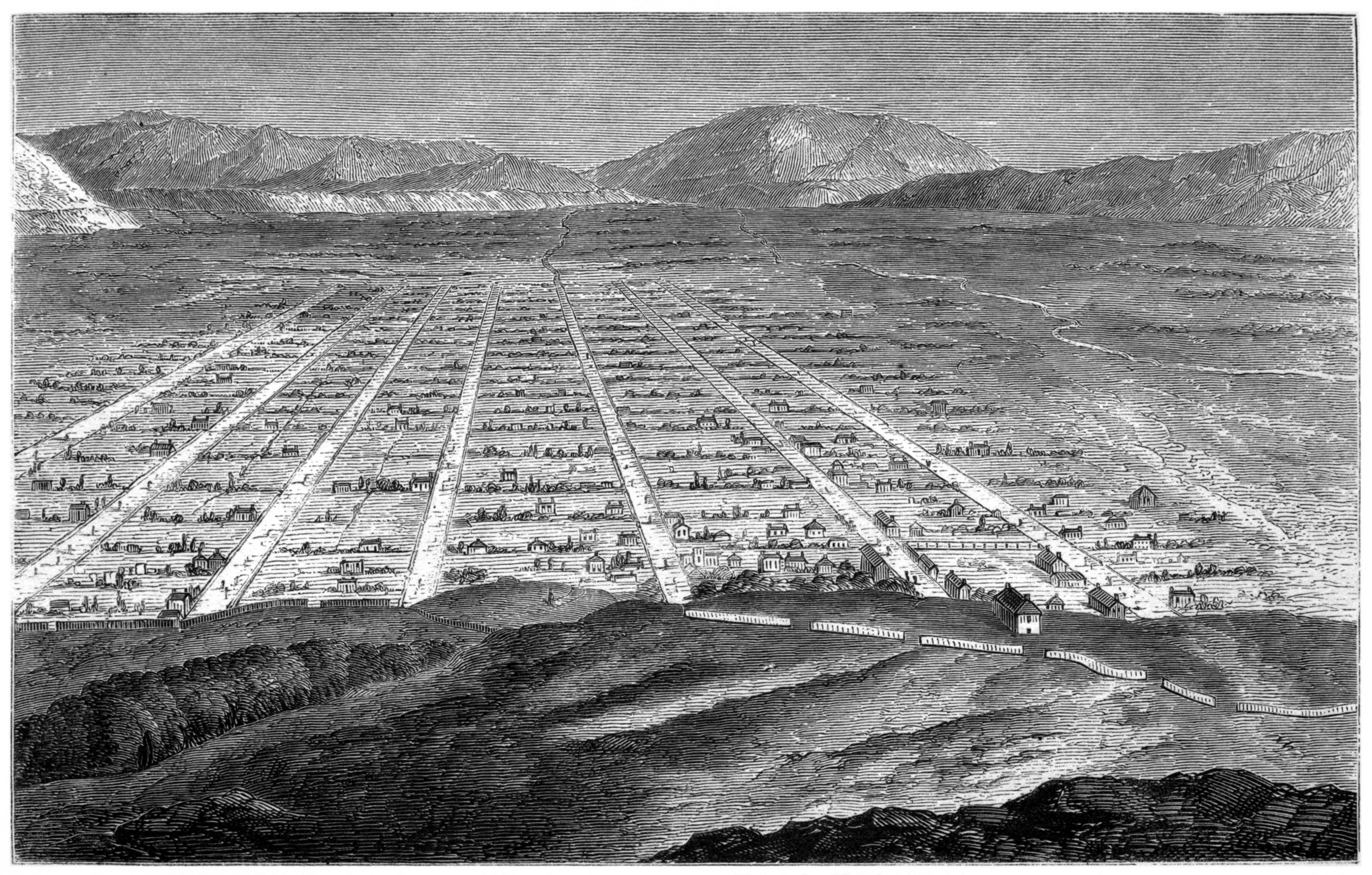
Sketch of Salt Lake City as viewed from the North

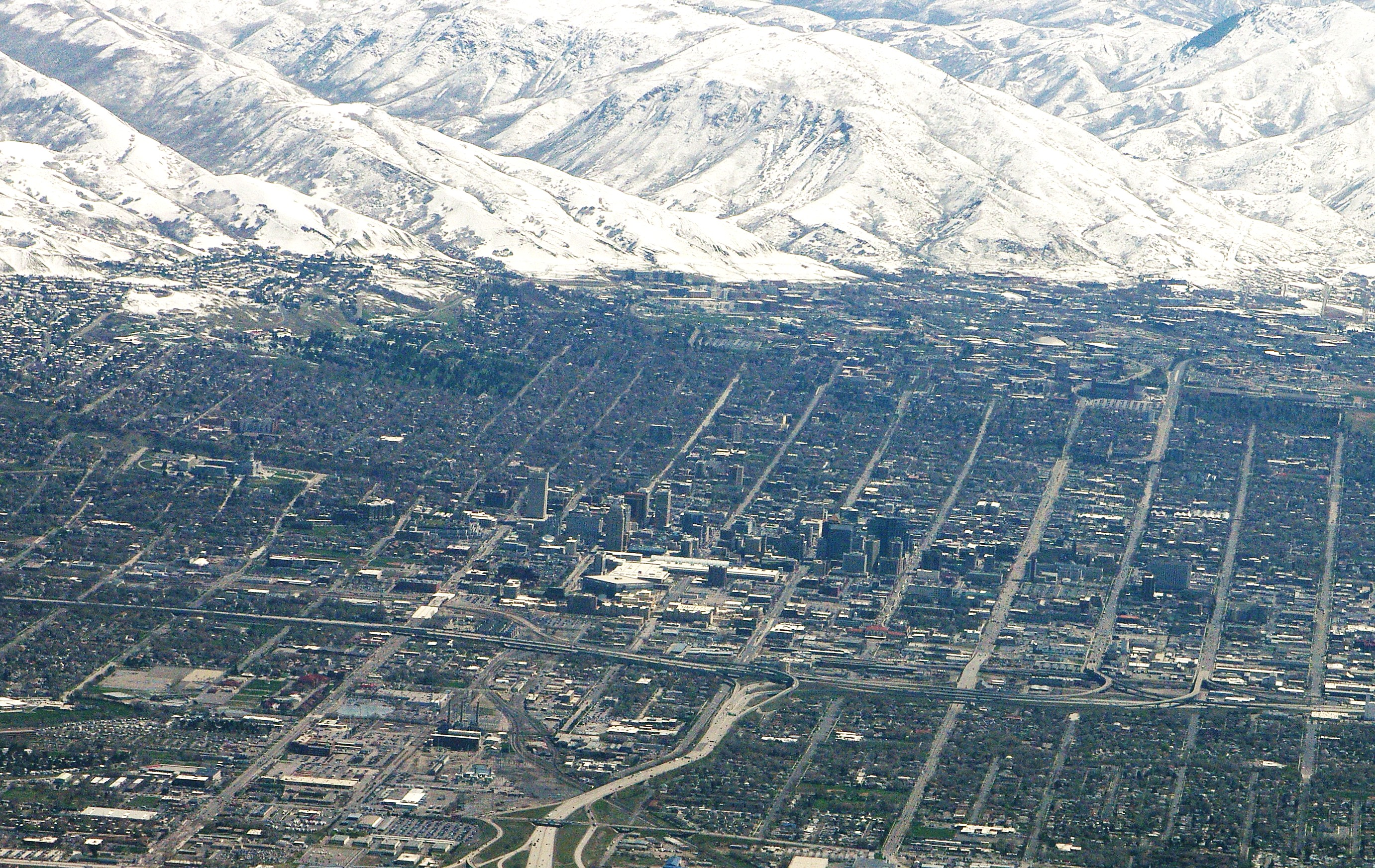
Aerial photo of downtown Salt Lake City showing the grid, 2011

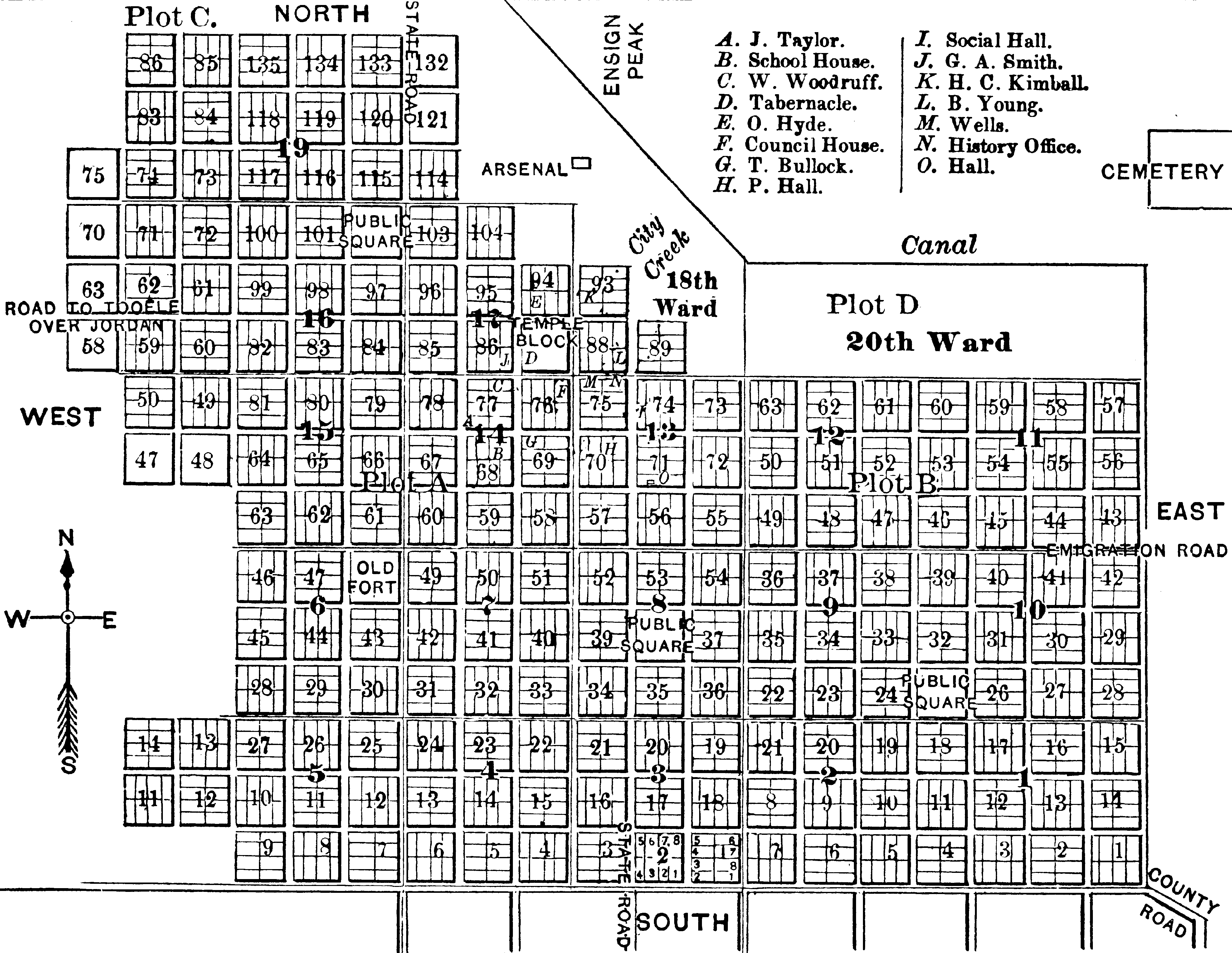
Salt Lake City in 1860

== Development ==
=== Agrarian ===
The Salt Lake Valley was founded first upon an agrarian system and later combined with non-agrarian techniques by way of manufacturing and the use of the railroad. The early agrarian development began by appointing crews to "plow, plant, survey, build fences, saw timber, build a public shelter, and explore". Their agrarian system was composed of proper irrigation for successful farming of staple crops. Since it was already late in the season, being July, plowing and irrigating occurred around the clock. Between July 23 and the 28th eighty-four acres had been farmed with corn, potatoes, beans, buckwheat, and turnips. In the north, semi-tropical crops were grown such as cotton, grapes, sugar cane, madder, mulberries, and indigo. "Brigham Young stressed agriculture as the essential base for developing the Mormon Kingdom". It was also stressed that it would be advantageous developing the valley by working together rather than individually.

=== Non-agrarian ===
After basic agrarian settlement, the saints were in demand of goods that came from outside their territory, wherein there was a lack in purchasing power due to high transportation costs for goods produced outside of the valley, this pushed them into manufacturing closer to home. Infant industry occurred within the home level when Brigham Young stated:

Produce what you consume; draw from the native element the necessities of life; permit no vitiated taste to lead you into the indulgence of expensive luxuries, which can only be obtained by involving yourself in debt; let home industry produce every article of home consumption.

Artisans and mechanics dropped into their chosen trade, including those that ground grain, sawed timber, blacksmithing, carpentering, and shoe making.

Until the introduction of rail, teams of oxen hauled raw materials from the mountains. Young admonished his people to add their labor power to the Transcontinental Railroad lines, which would meet at Promontory Point. In 1862 Abraham Lincoln signed the Pacific Railroad Act that would allow for the rail to reach the Salt Lake valley. Hon Farr, the Mayor of Ogden, in a speech, voiced his joy: "Hail to the great highway of the nations, Utah bids you welcome!" Once the rail was introduced in the valley, seven additional lines were built to transport heavy materials, such as granite, from distant areas, as well as to transport people.

== See also ==
- Mormon pioneers
- Kingdom of God (Christianity)
