= Kidder Township, Caldwell County, Missouri =

Kidder Township
- Township
- Coordinates: 39°45′18″N 094°07′28″W
- Country: United States
- State: Missouri
- County: Caldwell

Area
  - Total: 36.10 sq mi (93.49 km^{2})
  - Land: 36.07 sq mi (93.42 km^{2})
  - Water: 0.023 sq mi (0.06 km^{2}) 0.06%
- Elevation: 935 ft (285 m)

Population (2000)
  - Total: 891
  - Density: 25/sq mi (9.5/km^{2})
- FIPS code: 29-38540
- GNIS feature ID: 0766364

Kidder Township is one of twelve townships in Caldwell County, Missouri, and is part of the Kansas City metropolitan area with the USA. As of the 2000 census, its population was 891.

== History ==
Kidder Township was organized in May 1867. In May 1870, it was reorganized to its present boundary. It was named for the town of Kidder.

== Geography ==
Kidder Township covers an area of 36.1 square miles (93 km^{2}) and contains one incorporated settlement, Kidder. It contains four cemeteries: Cameron Memorial Gardens, Kenney, Kidder and McDaniel.

The streams of East Sheep Creek, Jordan Branch, Long Branch and West Sheep Creek run through this township.
