= Herb Conyers =

American baseball player (1921–1964)

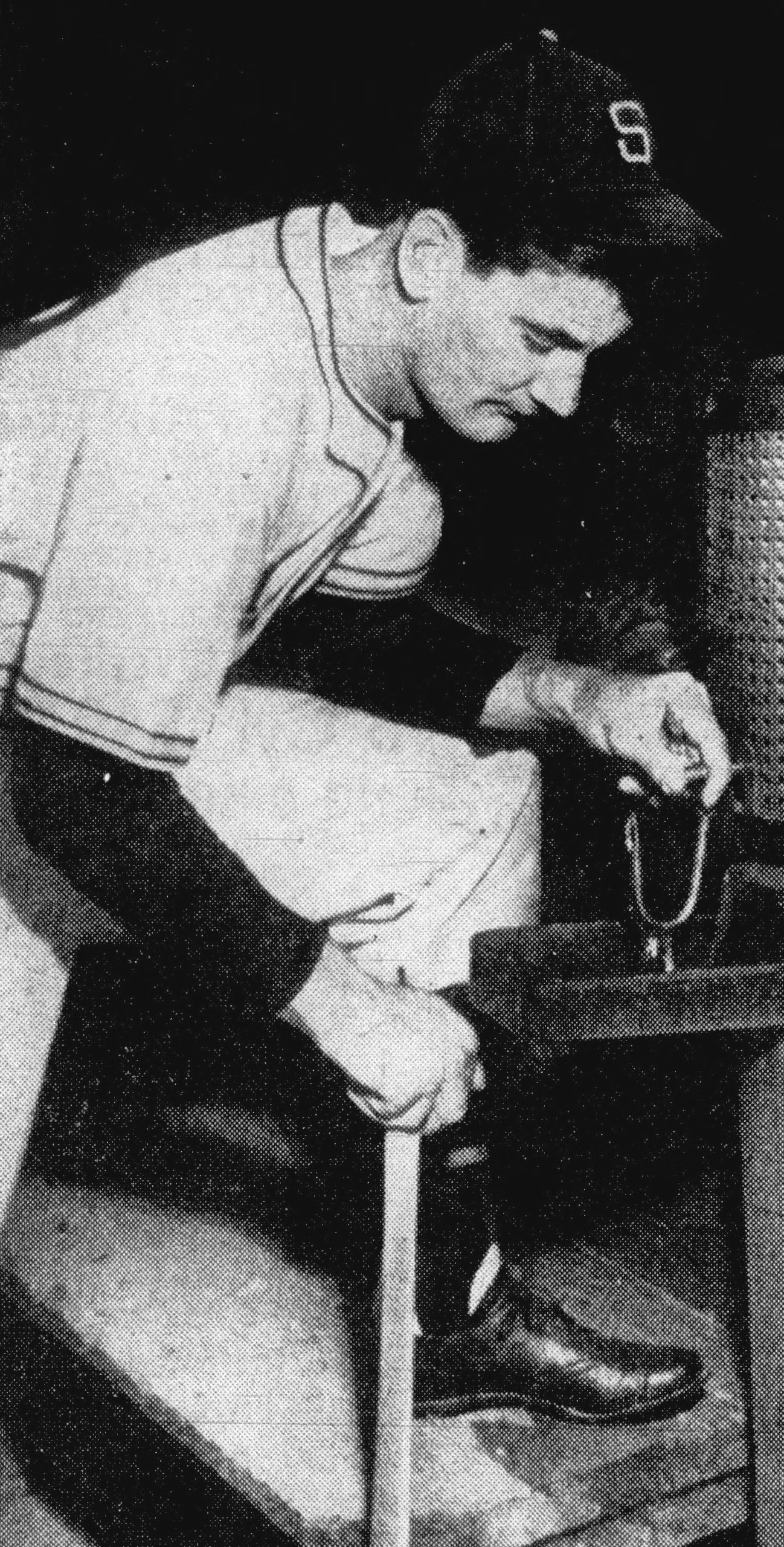
- Conyers in 1950
- First baseman/Pinch hitter
- Born: January 8, 1921; Cowgill, Missouri, U.S.
- Died: September 16, 1964 (aged 43); Cleveland, Ohio, U.S.
- Batted: Left Threw: Left

MLB debut
- April 18, 1950, for the Cleveland Indians

Last MLB appearance
- October 1, 1950, for the Cleveland Indians

MLB statistics
- Batting average: .333
- Home runs: 1
- Hits: 3
- Stats at Baseball Reference

Teams
- Cleveland Indians (1950)

Herbert Leroy Conyers (January 8, 1921 – September 16, 1964) was an American professional baseball player whose career lasted for nine seasons (1941–1942; 1946–1952). A first baseman, he appeared in seven Major League games for the Cleveland Indians during the 1950 season. Born in Cowgill, Missouri, Conyers threw and batted left-handed; he stood 6 feet 5 inches (1.96 m) tall and weighed 210 pounds (95 kg).

Conyers spent almost all of his pro career in the Cleveland minor league organization. His trial with the 1950 Indians came at the beginning and tail end of the season. After going two for four with a base on balls as a pinch hitter between April 18 and May 17, he spent the bulk of the season with Cleveland's two top farm teams, the Oklahoma City Indians and the San Diego Padres. Recalled late in the campaign, he started his final MLB game on October 1 against the Detroit Tigers; he garnered only one hit in five at bats, but it was a solo home run off Marlin Stuart that ignited a five-run eighth-inning rally and enabled the Indians to overtake the Tigers, 7–5.

Conyers died at age 43 from cancer in Cleveland, Ohio. He was buried at nearby Knollwood Cemetery.

== Bibliography ==
- Lee, Bill (2009). The Baseball Necrology: The Post-Baseball Lives and Deaths of Over 7,600 Major League Players and Others. Jefferson, N.C.: McFarland & Co. ISBN 9780786442393.
