= Catawba, Missouri =

Extinct Hamlet in Missouri, U.S.

Coordinates: 39°38′27″N 93°50′01″W

Catawba is an extinct hamlet in eastern Caldwell County, in the U.S. state of Missouri.

== History ==
Catawba was laid out in 1884, and named for a grove of catalpa trees near the original town site. A post office called Catawba was established in 1872, and remained in operation until 1905.
