= Colin Brown (American football) =

American football player (born 1985)

No. 74
- Position: Offensive tackle

Personal information
- Born: August 29, 1985 (age 41); Chillicothe, Missouri, U.S.
- Listed height: 6 ft 7 in (2.01 m)
- Listed weight: 326 lb (148 kg)

Career information
- High school: Braymer (MO)
- College: Missouri
- NFL draft: 2009: 5th round, 139th overall pick

Career history
- Kansas City Chiefs (2009); Hartford Colonials (2010); Baltimore Ravens (2010)*; Buffalo Bills (2010–2013)
- * Offseason or practice squad member only

Career NFL statistics
- Games played: 18
- Games started: 7
- Stats at Pro Football Reference

Colin Christopher Brown (born August 29, 1985) is an American former professional football player who was an offensive tackle in the National Football League (NFL). He played college football for the Missouri Tigers and was selected 139th overall by the Kansas City Chiefs in the fifth round of the 2009 NFL draft.

The Buffalo Bills released Colin Brown on October 15, 2013.
