= Mirabile, Missouri =

Unincorporated community in Missouri, U.S.

Coordinates: 39.616117°N 94.141887°W

Mirabile is an unincorporated community in western Caldwell County, in the U.S. state of Missouri.

== History ==
Mirabile, established in 1848 by William Marquam, is the second oldest community in the county. A post office called Mirabile was established in 1849, and remained in operation until 1941. Mirabile is a name derived from Latin meaning "wonderful".

== Geography ==
The community is located on Missouri Route D about 5.5 miles southwest of Kingston, Missouri. The reservoir Simmons Lake lies to its northeast, and the source of Tub Creek is just to the southeast. The community is but a few sparsely settled blocks in size.
