= Polo, Missouri =

- City
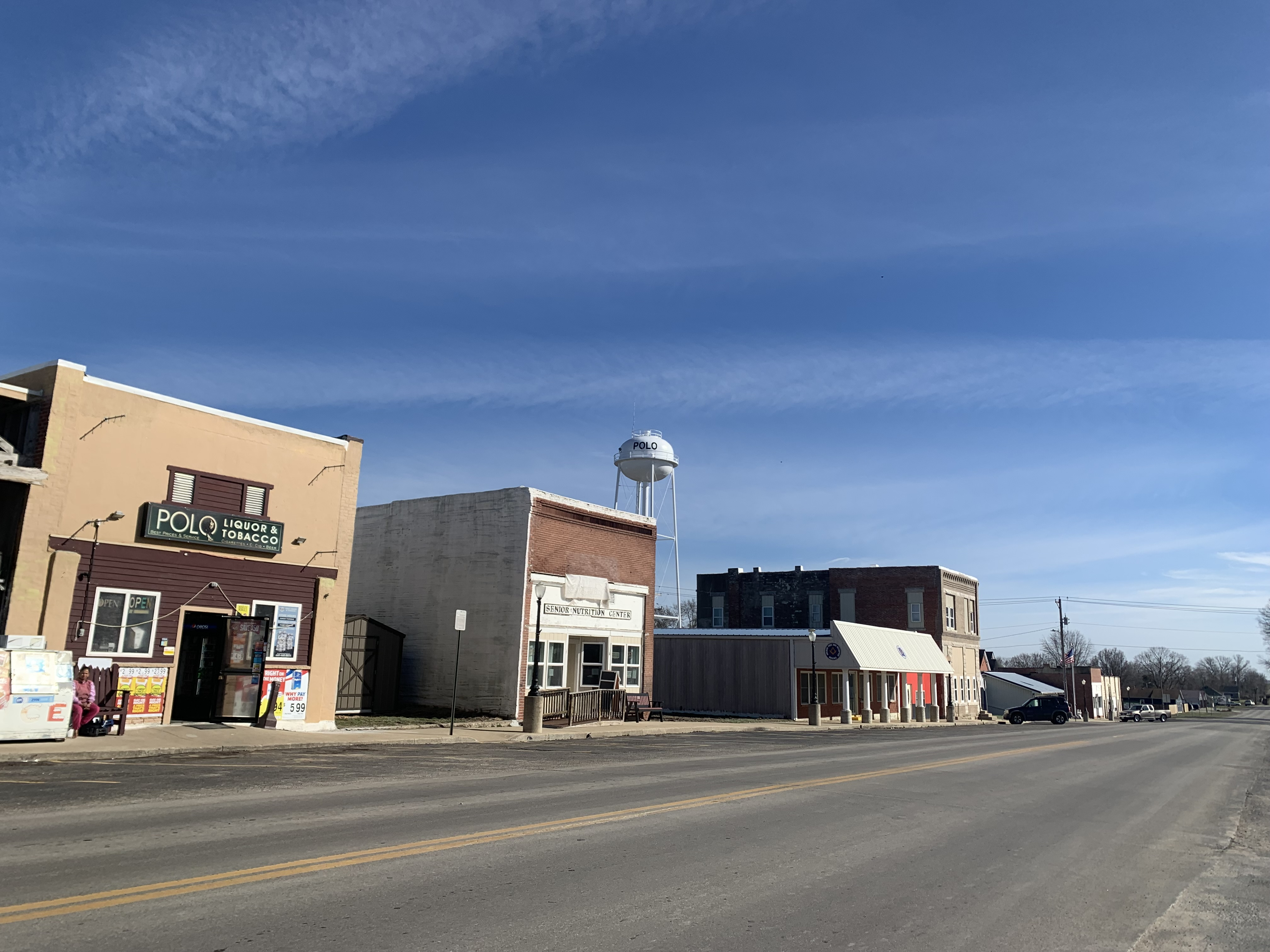
- Downtown Polo with water tower in view

- Location of Polo, Missouri
- Coordinates: 39°32′58″N 94°02′22″W
- Country: United States
- State: Missouri
- County: Caldwell

Area
  - Total: 0.62 sq mi (1.61 km^{2})
  - Land: 0.61 sq mi (1.59 km^{2})
  - Water: 0.0039 sq mi (0.01 km^{2})
- Elevation: 1,004 ft (306 m)

Population (2020)
  - Total: 509
  - Density: 826.8/sq mi (319.24/km^{2})
- Time zone: UTC-6 (Central (CST))
  - Summer (DST): UTC-5 (CDT)
- ZIP code: 64671
- Area code: 660
- FIPS code: 29-58916
- GNIS feature ID: 2396247

Polo is a city in southwest Caldwell County, Missouri, and is part of the Kansas City metropolitan area with the United States. The population was 509 at the 2020 census.

== History ==
Polo was laid out in 1867. The city's name is a transfer from Polo, Illinois. A post office called Polo has been in operation since 1868.

Two developers, Paul Outersky and Larry Outersky, have been attributed for having provided the name, but this has been debunked.

== Geography ==
Polo is located at the intersection of Missouri routes 13 and 116. Kingston is six miles to the north, Cowgill is approximately six miles east and Knoxville in adjacent Ray County is seven miles south.

According to the United States Census Bureau, the city has a total area of 0.63 square miles (1.63 km^{2}), of which 0.62 square miles (1.61 km^{2}) is land and 0.01 square miles (0.03 km^{2}) is water.

== Demographics ==
Historical population
Census	Pop.	Note	%±
1880	72		—
1890	415		476.4%
1900	539		29.9%
1910	526		−2.4%
1920	606		15.2%
1930	584		−3.6%
1940	590		1.0%
1950	549		−6.9%
1960	469		−14.6%
1970	438		−6.6%
1980	583		33.1%
1990	539		−7.5%
2000	582		8.0%
2010	575		−1.2%
2020	509		−11.5%
U.S. Decennial Census

=== 2010 census ===
As of the census of 2010, there were 575 people, 229 households, and 136 families residing in the city. The population density was 927.4 inhabitants per square mile (358.1/km^{2}). There were 256 housing units at an average density of 412.9 per square mile (159.4/km^{2}). The racial makeup of the city was 95.1% White, 0.3% African American, 0.2% Asian, 0.3% from other races, and 4.0% from two or more races. Hispanic or Latino of any race were 1.9% of the population.

There were 229 households, of which 31.0% had children under the age of 18 living with them, 41.5% were married couples living together, 13.1% had a female householder with no husband present, 4.8% had a male householder with no wife present, and 40.6% were non-families. 33.6% of all households were made up of individuals, and 17% had someone living alone who was 65 years of age or older. The average household size was 2.46 and the average family size was 3.17.

The median age in the city was 38.9 years. 26.8% of residents were under the age of 18; 6.8% were between the ages of 18 and 24; 24.2% were from 25 to 44; 22.8% were from 45 to 64; and 19.5% were 65 years of age or older. The gender makeup of the city was 47.3% male and 52.7% female.

=== 2000 census ===
As of the census of 2000, there were 582 people, 239 households, and 150 families residing in the city. The population density was 1,006.4 inhabitants per square mile (388.6/km^{2}). There were 262 housing units at an average density of 453.0 per square mile (174.9/km^{2}). The racial makeup of the city was 99.48% White, 0.17% from other races, and 0.34% from two or more races. Hispanic or Latino of any race were 1.37% of the population.

There were 239 households, out of which 28.5% had children under the age of 18 living with them, 49.4% were married couples living together, 7.5% had a female householder with no husband present, and 37.2% were non-families. 31.4% of all households were made up of individuals, and 17.2% had someone living alone who was 65 years of age or older. The average household size was 2.44 and the average family size was 3.09.

In the city the population was spread out, with 25.8% under the age of 18, 8.6% from 18 to 24, 27.5% from 25 to 44, 22.3% from 45 to 64, and 15.8% who were 65 years of age or older. The median age was 36 years. For every 100 females, there were 94.6 males. For every 100 females age 18 and over, there were 94.6 males.

The median income for a household in the city was $34,250, and the median income for a family was $36,705. Males had a median income of $32,375 versus $21,111 for females. The per capita income for the city was $15,868. About 5.2% of families and 7.1% of the population were below the poverty line, including 5.5% of those under age 18 and 6.3% of those age 65 or over.

== Education ==
It is in the Polo R-VII School District.

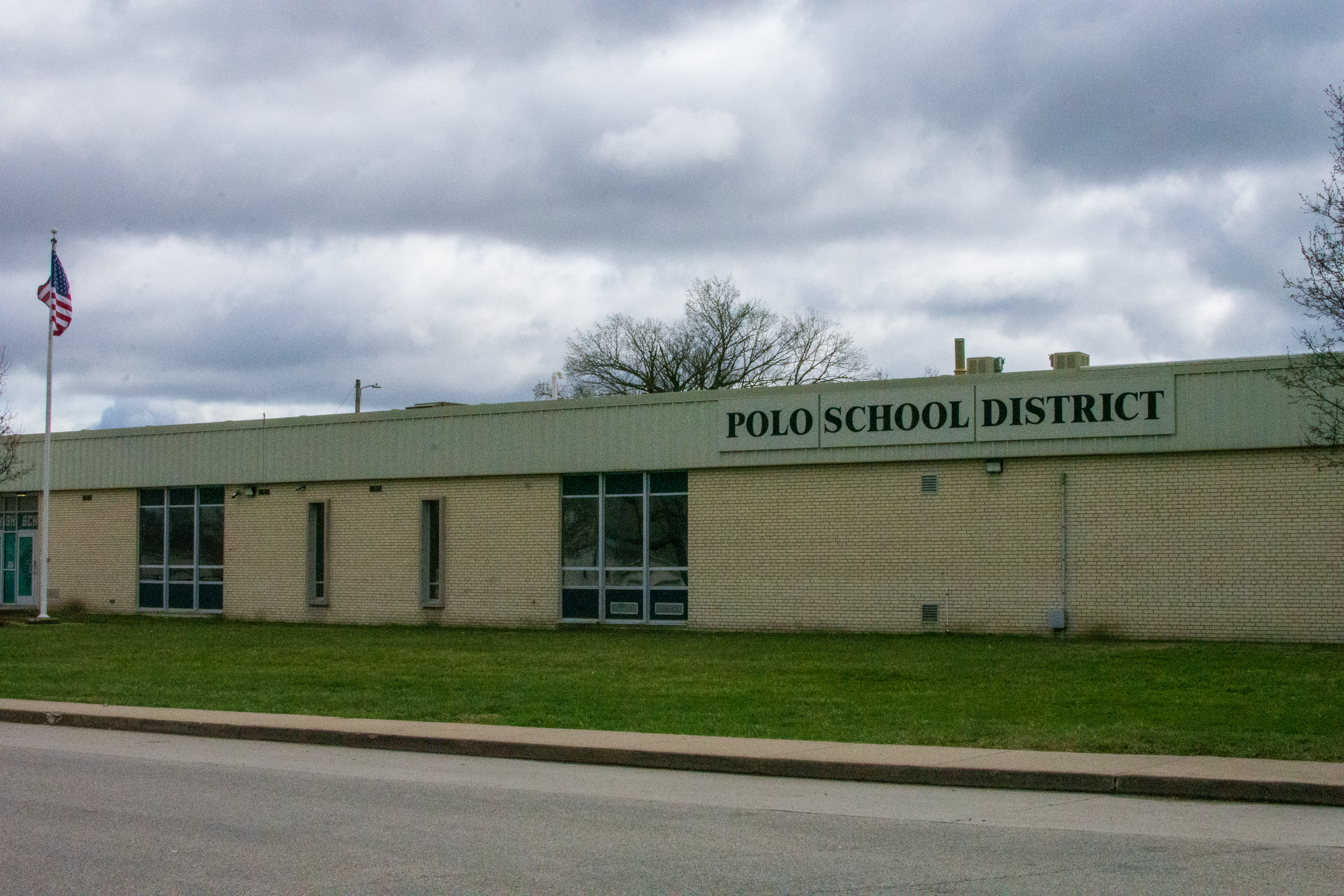
Polo School, which educates K-12

The boys high school track and field team won three consecutive MSHSAA state titles from 2005-2007 despite the team not having a track to practice on.

== Notable people ==
- Zack Wheat, was a Major League Baseball catcher for Brooklyn and the Philadelphia Phillies
