= Breckenridge, Missouri =

- City
- Location of Breckenridge, Missouri
- Coordinates: 39°45′41″N 93°48′17″W
- Country: United States
- State: Missouri
- County: Caldwell

Area
  - Total: 0.55 sq mi (1.43 km^{2})
  - Land: 0.55 sq mi (1.42 km^{2})
  - Water: 0 sq mi (0.00 km^{2})
- Elevation: 925 ft (282 m)

Population (2020)
  - Total: 258
  - Density: 469.5/sq mi (181.29/km^{2})
- Time zone: UTC-6 (Central (CST))
  - Summer (DST): UTC-5 (CDT)
- ZIP code: 64625
- Area code: 660
- FIPS code: 29-08128
- GNIS feature ID: 2393406

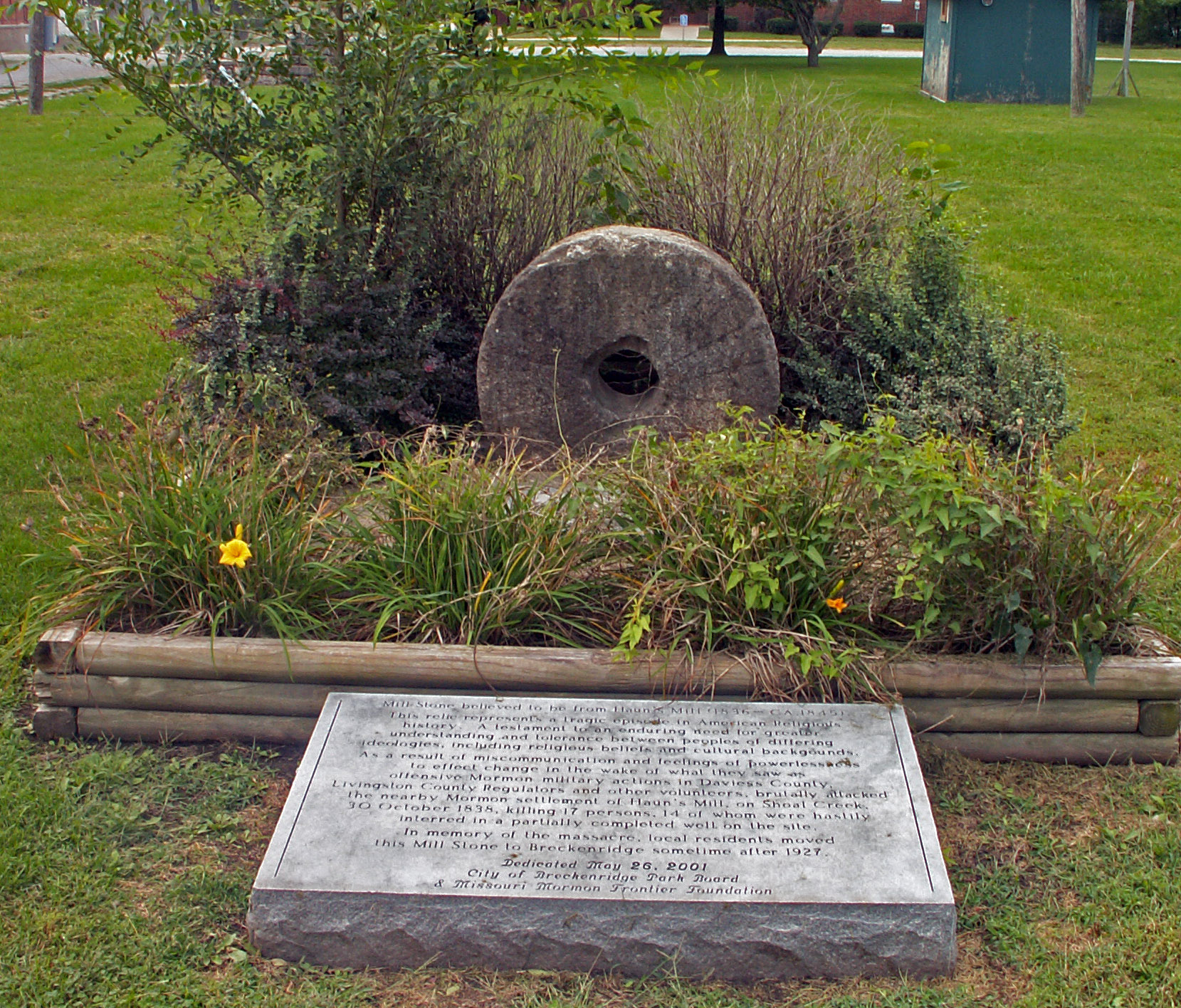
Wheel from Hawn's Mill massacre in Breckenridge City Park

Breckenridge is a city in northeast Caldwell County, Missouri, and is part of the Kansas City metropolitan area with the United States. The population was 258 at the 2020 census.

== History ==
Breckenridge was laid out in 1856 along the Hannibal & St. Joseph Railroad, and named for Vice President John C. Breckinridge. A post office called Breckenridge has been in operation since 1860.

== Geography ==
Breckenridge is located at an altitude of 927 feet (283 m).

According to the United States Census Bureau, the city has a total area of 0.55 square miles (1.42 km^{2}), all land.

== Demographics ==
Historical population
Census	Pop.	Note	%±
1870	515		—
1880	777		50.9%
1890	768		−1.2%
1900	1,012		31.8%
1910	1,025		1.3%
1920	860		−16.1%
1930	828		−3.7%
1940	728		−12.1%
1950	617		−15.2%
1960	605		−1.9%
1970	598		−1.2%
1980	523		−12.5%
1990	418		−20.1%
2000	454		8.6%
2010	383		−15.6%
2020	258		−32.6%
U.S. Decennial Census

=== 2010 census ===
As of the census of 2010, there were 383 people, 160 households, and 97 families residing in the city. The population density was 696.4 inhabitants per square mile (268.9/km^{2}). There were 205 housing units at an average density of 372.7 per square mile (143.9/km^{2}). The racial makeup of the city was 92.4% White, 0.5% African American, 1.8% Native American, 0.5% from other races, and 4.7% from two or more races. Hispanic or Latino of any race were 0.8% of the population.

There were 160 households, of which 32.5% had children under the age of 18 living with them, 37.5% were married couples living together, 16.3% had a female householder with no husband present, 6.9% had a male householder with no wife present, and 39.4% were non-families. 33.8% of all households were made up of individuals, and 11.2% had someone living alone who was 65 years of age or older. The average household size was 2.39 and the average family size was 3.04.

The median age in the city was 38.4 years. 27.7% of residents were under the age of 18; 8.5% were between the ages of 18 and 24; 22.1% were from 25 to 44; 28.5% were from 45 to 64; and 13.1% were 65 years of age or older. The gender makeup of the city was 52.2% male and 47.8% female.

=== 2000 census ===
As of the census of 2000, there were 454 people, 191 households, and 123 families residing in the city. The population density was 822.1 inhabitants per square mile (317.4/km^{2}). There were 230 housing units at an average density of 416.5 per square mile (160.8/km^{2}). The racial makeup of the city was 96.48% White, 1.76% Native American, 0.22% Asian, 0.44% from other races, and 1.10% from two or more races. Hispanic or Latino of any race were 0.44% of the population.

There were 191 households, out of which 30.9% had children under the age of 18 living with them, 45.5% were married couples living together, 13.1% had a female householder with no husband present, and 35.6% were non-families. 31.4% of all households were made up of individuals, and 12.0% had someone living alone who was 65 years of age or older. The average household size was 2.38 and the average family size was 3.02.

In the city the population was spread out, with 28.6% under the age of 18, 8.1% from 18 to 24, 27.8% from 25 to 44, 22.0% from 45 to 64, and 13.4% who were 65 years of age or older. The median age was 34 years. For every 100 females, there were 107.3 males. For every 100 females age 18 and over, there were 102.5 males.

The median income for a household in the city was $23,625, and the median income for a family was $28,750. Males had a median income of $24,712 versus $14,464 for females. The per capita income for the city was $12,468. About 13.7% of families and 23.2% of the population were below the poverty line, including 34.8% of those under age 18 and 9.0% of those age 65 or over.

== Education ==
It is in the Breckenridge R-I School District. Breckenridge R-I School District operates one elementary school and Breckenridge High School in the same facility. It is one of the smallest K-12 school districts in the state of Missouri.
