= Braymer, Missouri =

- City
- Nickname: Biggest Little Town in Missouri
- Location of Braymer, Missouri
- Coordinates: 39°35′26″N 93°47′46″W
- Country: United States
- State: Missouri
- County: Caldwell

Area
  - Total: 0.59 sq mi (1.53 km^{2})
  - Land: 0.59 sq mi (1.53 km^{2})
  - Water: 0 sq mi (0.00 km^{2})
- Elevation: 774 ft (236 m)

Population (2020)
  - Total: 737
  - Density: 1,246.8/sq mi (481.38/km^{2})
- Time zone: UTC-6 (Central (CST))
  - Summer (DST): UTC-5 (CDT)
- ZIP code: 64624
- Area code: 660
- FIPS code: 29-08038
- GNIS feature ID: 2393402

Braymer is a city in southeast Caldwell County, Missouri. The population was 737 at the 2020 census.

== History ==
Braymer was laid out in 1887 by Milwaukee Land Company along the Chicago, Milwaukee, & St. Paul Railroad, and named for Judge Daniel Braymer, an influential local banker. A post office has been in operation at Braymer since July 12th, 1887.

== Geography ==
The community is at the intersection of Missouri routes 116, A and N. Cowgill is approximately seven miles to the west-southwest and Ludlow in adjacent Livingston County is 6.5 miles to the northeast. Mud Creek flows past the east side of the location.

According to the United States Census Bureau, the city has a total area of 0.59 square miles (1.53 km^{2}), all land.

== Demographics ==
Historical population
Census	Pop.	Note	%±
1890	399		—
1900	767		92.2%
1910	1,027		33.9%
1920	1,018		−0.9%
1930	933		−8.3%
1940	975		4.5%
1950	955		−2.1%
1960	874		−8.5%
1970	919		5.1%
1980	986		7.3%
1990	886		−10.1%
2000	910		2.7%
2010	878		−3.5%
2020	737		−16.1%
U.S. Decennial Census

=== 2010 census ===
As of the census of 2010, there were 878 people, 368 households, and 234 families residing in the city. The population density was 1,488.1 inhabitants per square mile (574.6/km^{2}). There were 429 housing units at an average density of 727.1 units per square mile (280.7 units/km^{2}). The racial makeup of the city was 98.1% White, 0.1% Native American, 0.1% Asian, and 1.7% from two or more races. Hispanic or Latino of any race were 0.2% of the population.

There were 368 households, of which 35.1% had children under the age of 18 living with them, 45.4% were married couples living together, 13.6% had a female householder with no husband present, 4.6% had a male householder with no wife present, and 36.4% were non-families. 31.5% of all households were made up of individuals, and 17.6% had someone living alone who was 65 years of age or older. The average household size was 2.39 and the average family size was 2.99.

The median age in the city was 36.6 years. 28.2% of residents were under the age of 18; 6.9% were between the ages of 18 and 24; 25.1% were from 25 to 44; 22.2% were from 45 to 64; and 17.8% were 65 years of age or older. The gender makeup of the city was 48.4% male and 51.6% female.

=== 2000 census ===
As of the census of 2000, there were 910 people, 392 households, and 248 families residing in the city. The population density was 1,617.1 inhabitants per square mile (624.4/km^{2}). There were 451 housing units at an average density of 801.4 units per square mile (309.4 units/km^{2}). The racial makeup of the city was 98.57% White, 0.22% Native American, 0.33% Asian, and 0.88% from two or more races. Hispanic or Latino of any race were 0.33% of the population.

There were 392 households, out of which 32.1% had children under the age of 18 living with them, 46.7% were married couples living together, 12.5% had a female householder with no husband present, and 36.7% were non-families. 32.1% of all households were made up of individuals, and 17.9% had someone living alone who was 65 years of age or older. The average household size was 2.32 and the average family size was 2.93.

In the city the population was spread out, with 28.2% under the age of 18, 8.1% from 18 to 24, 23.7% from 25 to 44, 22.0% from 45 to 64, and 17.9% who were 65 years of age or older. The median age was 37 years. For every 100 females, there were 86.9 males. For every 100 females age 18 and over, there were 85.0 males.

The median income for a household in the city was $26,667, and the median income for a family was $35,391. Males had a median income of $28,304 versus $20,000 for females. The per capita income for the city was $14,518. About 7.8% of families and 12.4% of the population were below the poverty line, including 14.9% of those under age 18 and 8.8% of those age 65 or over.

== Education ==
It is in the Braymer C-4 School District.

== Notable people ==
- Colin Brown, former NFL player for the Kansas City Chiefs, Baltimore Ravens, and Buffalo Bills
- Quinn Brown, college football coach for Virginia Union University, Bowie State University, and Henderson State University
