= Carroll-Livingston Activities Association =

High school athletic conference in northwest Missouri, United States

- Association: MSHSAA
- No. of teams: 11
- Region: Northwest Missouri

The Carroll-Livingston Activities Association, or CLAA, is a high school athletic conference comprising small-size high schools located in northwest Missouri, northeast of Kansas City. Originally made up predominately of schools in Carroll and Livingston counties, the conference members now are located in Caldwell, Carroll, Chariton, Livingston, Randolph, and Ray counties.

== Members ==
As of 2025, the Carroll-Livingston Activities Association consists of eleven high schools. The conference consists of Class 1 schools (in boys' basketball), the smallest class in Missouri.

School	Nickname	Colors	City	County	Type
Bosworth	Bulldogs		Bosworth	Carroll	Public
Breckenridge	Bulldogs		Breckenridge	Caldwell	Public
Brunswick	Wildcats		Brunswick	Chariton	Public
Hale	Cardinals		Hale	Carroll	Public
Hardin-Central	Bulldogs		Hardin	Ray	Public
Higbee	Tigers		Higbee	Randolph	Public
Keytesville	Tigers		Keytesville	Chariton	Public
Norborne	Pirates		Norborne	Carroll	Public
Northwestern	Eagles		Mendon	Chariton	Public
Southwest Livingston	Wildcats		Ludlow	Livingston	Public
Tina-Avalon	Dragons		Tina	Carroll	Public

== Former Members ==
School	Nickname	Colors	City	County	Type	Years
Braymer	Bobcats		Braymer	Caldwell	Public	2020-2025
Meadville	Eagles		Meadville	Linn	Public	
Stet §	Cardinals		Stet	Carroll	Public	
Wheeling §	Bulldogs		Wheeling	Livingston	Public	

§ - School district permanently closed.
