= Missouri Route 41 =

State highway in Missouri, U.S.

Route 41

Route information
- Maintained by MoDOT
- Length: 45.981 mi (73.999 km)
- Existed: 1922–present

Major junctions
- South end: I-70 / US 40 / Route 135 west of Boonville
- North end: US 24 west of Brunswick

Location
- Country: United States
- State: Missouri

Highway system
- Missouri State Highway System; Interstate; US; State; Supplemental
← US 40	→ Route 42

Route 41 is a highway in central Missouri. Its northern terminus is at U.S. Route 24 in southern Carroll County; its southern terminus is at Interstate 70/U.S. Route 40 west of Boonville, where the road continues south as Route 135.

Route 41 is one of the original state highways. Its original northern terminus was at the Missouri River and its southern terminus was in Marshall. The route east of Marshall was originally Route 20.

== Major intersections ==
County	Location	mi	km	Destinations	Notes
Cooper	Boonville Township	0.00	0.00	I-70 / US 40 / Route 135 south / Santa Fe National Historic Trail east – Columbia, Kansas City, Pilot Grove	Roadways continues as Route 135
Cooper	Boonville Township	0.10	0.16	Old US 40 / Lewis and Clark Trail east	
Saline	Arrow Rock	12.890	20.744	Main Street (Route 41 Spur) / Route TT	
Saline	Marshall Township	23.157	37.268	Route 240 east – Slater	Southern end of Route 240 overlap
Saline	Marshall	26.9	43.3	Route O – Marshall	Northbound exit southbound entrance
Saline	Marshall	28.117	45.250	US 65 Bus. / Route 240 west / Lewis and Clark Trail west / Santa Fe National Historic Trail to US 65 – Marshall	Northern end of Route 240 overlap
Saline	Fairville	35.246	56.723	Route 122 west / Route NN – Van Meter State Park, Slater	
Saline	Miami	41.027	66.027	Huron Trail (Route 41 Spur)	
Carroll	De Witt Township	45.981	73.999	US 24 / Lewis and Clark Trail – De Witt, Carrollton	
1.000 mi = 1.609 km; 1.000 km = 0.621 mi: Concurrency terminus; Incomplete access
