= White Rock, Missouri =

Unincorporated community in Missouri, U.S.

Coordinates: 39°20′04″N 93°17′05″W

White Rock is an unincorporated community in southeast Carroll County, in the U.S. state of Missouri.

The community is on Missouri Route O and is on a prominence above the Missouri River floodplain. Wakenda Creek flows past along the edge of the floodplain south of the community. De Witt is five miles to the northeast and Wakenda is five miles to the southwest. Miami is across the river to the southeast. Miami Station on the Wabash Railroad is 1.5 miles to the northeast.

The community was named for deposits of white rock quarried along the bluff face below the town site.
