= Wakenda Creek =

Stream in the American state of Missouri

Wakenda Creek is a stream in Carroll, Ray and Saline counties in the U.S. state of Missouri. It is a tributary of the Missouri River.

The stream headwaters arise in northeast Ray County approximately three miles west of the community of Regal at 39°26′54″N 93°53′42″W. The stream flows east then turns southeast passing Missouri Route A south of Regal and Missouri Route K two miles west of Stet. It continues southeast passing under Missouri Route J and into Carroll County two miles south of Stet. The stream continues to the southeast for another 2.5 miles then turns to the east and passes under Missouri Route D 2.5 miles north of Norborne. The stream meanders to the east passing under US Route 65 in south Carrollton. The stream continues to the east passing under Missouri Route B just north of Wakenda and enters the Missouri River floodplain passing south of White Rock. It flows in an old meander of the Missouri to enter the Missouri River just to the north of Miami in northern Saline County. The confluence is at 39°19′47″N 93°13′37″W.

Wakenda Creek is named after a Siouan name for the Great Spirit.

== See also ==
- List of rivers of Missouri
