= Flirting with the Universe =

Flirting With the Universe

Studio album by the Rainmakers
- Released: 1994
- Recorded: August 1993 – April 1994
- Studio: Steve's basement, Kansas City, Missouri
- Genre: Pop rock
- Length: 46:53
- Label: Mercury
- Producer: The Rainmakers

The Rainmakers chronology
The Best of the Rainmakers (1993)	Flirting With the Universe (1994)	Skin (1996)

Flirting with the Universe is the fourth studio album by the Rainmakers, released in 1994. The album achieved the equivalent of gold record status in Norway in one month, and also peaked at No. 12 on the Norwegian album chart.

== Track listing ==
All tracks written by Bob Walkenhorst except where noted.

1. "Another Guitar" – 4:25
2. "Width of a Line" – 3:52
3. "Fool's Gold" – 4:41
4. "Window" (Steve Phillips) – 4:00
5. "View from the Tower" – 4:27
6. "Greatest Night of My Life" – 4:43
7. "Wilder Side" (Steve Phillips) – 3:20
8. "You Remind Me of Someone" – 2:52
9. "Little Tiny World" – 4:07
10. "Mystery Road" – 5:21
11. "Spite" – 5:05

== Personnel ==
- Bob Walkenhorst – lead vocals, guitar, keyboards, harmonica
- Rich Ruth – bass guitar
- Steve Phillips – guitar, vocals, keyboards, dulcimer
- Pat Tomek – drums, vocals
