= The Good News and the Bad News =

Studio album by the Rainmakers
- Released: 1989
- Recorded: December 1988 – February 1989
- Studio: Cherokee, Los Angeles, California
- Genre: Rock
- Length: 40:44
- Label: Mercury
- Producer: Jeff Glixman, Bob Walkenhorst

The Rainmakers chronology
Tornado (1987)	The Good News and the Bad News (1989)	Oslo-Wichita LIVE (1990)

The Good News and the Bad News is the third studio album by the American band the Rainmakers, released in 1989. "Spend It on Love" was released as a single. The band supported the album by touring with the Doobie Brothers.

A remastered version of the album was released in 2010 with seven additional tracks.

== Production ==
The album was primarily produced by Jeff Glixman. Bob Walkenhorst chose to forgo obvious messages in his lyrics.

== Critical reception ==
Professional ratings
Review scores
Source	Rating
AllMusic	3.0/5 stars
Chicago Tribune	3/4 stars

The Chicago Tribune concluded: "What sounded like a good bunch of musicians who played some pretty thoughtful music has evolved into a band of unquestionable conscience and substance." The Toronto Star noted the "honest, unabashedly familiar guitar crunch that runs the same catalogue of riffs favored by Georgia Satellites and several thousand others." The Kingston Whig-Standard wrote that "the sound is a mixture of twangy electric and thumping acoustic guitars." The Times opined that "the album showcases some fine songwriting, and an old-fashioned, passionate commitment to the rock'n'roll craft."

== Track listing ==
All tracks written by Bob Walkenhorst except where noted.

1. "Reckoning Day" – 3:10
2. "Hoo Dee Hoo" – 4:28
3. "Spend It on Love" – 2:54
4. "Battle of the Roses" – 4:08
5. "Wild Oats" – 3:17
6. "We Walk the Levee" – 4:14
7. "Thirty Days" – 4:08
8. "Knock on Wood" (Steve Phillips) – 3:18
9. "Dry Dry Land" – 3:31
10. "Shiny Shiny" – 2:52
11. "Johnny Reb" – 2:32
12. "Horn O Plenty" – 2:12

Bonus tracks on 2010 remastered CD

1. "Frustration Train" (acoustic) – 5:11
2. "Renaissance Man" (acoustic) – 4:10
3. "Prove Me Wrong" (acoustic) – 4:18
4. "Downstream" (acoustic) – 3:04
5. "Johnny Reb" (acoustic) – 2:41
6. "Spend It on Love" (acoustic) – 3:05
7. "Shenandoah" (traditional American folk song) (acoustic) – 2:46

== Personnel ==
The Rainmakers

- Bob Walkenhorst – lead vocals, guitar
- Rich Ruth – bass guitar, vocals
- Steve Phillips – lead guitar, vocals, lead vocal on "Knock on Wood"
- Pat Tomek – drums

Additional musicians

- Joanna Dean – vocals on "Dry Dry Land"
- Johnny Reno – saxophone on "Horn O Plenty", gang vocals on "Hoo Dee Hoo"
