= American Music: Off the Record =

- Directed by: Benjamin Meade
- Written by: Benjamin Meade
- Produced by: Frank Hicks; Benjamin Meade; Dianna Meade; Bill Pryor
- Starring: Noam Chomsky; Douglas Rushkoff
- Cinematography: J. Michael Adams; David Matheny; Benjamin Meade; Bill Pryor; Cody Wasson
- Edited by: Benjamin Meade
- Music by: Emily Kurn
- Production company: Universal Cartoon Studios
- Distributed by: Corticrawl Productions
- Release date: January 10, 2008
- Running time: 89 minutes
- Country: United States
- Language: English

American Music: Off the Record is a 2008 American documentary film that features theorists Noam Chomsky and Douglas Rushkoff in an interrogation of the American music industry. The film covers a great deal of ground from the authenticity of live music to the circumvention of the corporate machine by indie distribution, to the demise of the privately owned music store.

== Cast ==
- Bernard Allison
- Paul Barrere
- Bastard Sons of Johnny Cash
- The Belairs
- Bottle Rockets
- Savoy Brown
- Jackson Browne
- Buckethead
- Canned Heat
- Carlene Carter
- The Cates Brothers
- Noam Chomsky
- Chubby Carrier
- David Allan Coe
- Commander Cody
- Danny Cox
- Rodney Crowell
- Iris DeMent
- Rick Derringer
- Chris Duarte
- The Elders
- Chris Hillman
- Frank Hicks
- It's a Beautiful Day
- Wanda Jackson
- Jah Roots
- John Jorgenson
- Eric Lindell
- David Lindley
- Little Feat
- Country Joe McDonald
- James McMurtry
- Benjamin Meade
- Roger Miller
- Nace Brothers
- Lee Oskar
- Lee Roy Parnell
- Les Paul
- Herb Pederson
- Ray Price
- The Rainmakers
- Lee Ranaldo
- Kasey Rausch
- Robert Reynolds
- Roomful of Blues
- Douglas Rushkoff
- Billy Joe Shaver
- Kim Simmonds
- Sonic Youth
- Richard Thompson
- Paul Thor
- Bob Walkenhorst
- War
- Watermelon Slim
- Rev. Billy C. Wertz
- Lizzie West
- Edgar Winter
- Johnny Winter
- Carolyn Wonderland
