= The Rainmakers discography =

Discography of The Rainmakers

This is a discography for Kansas City–based rock band The Rainmakers.

Unless otherwise stated, all releases are on the Polygram label in Europe and the Mercury Records label in the U.S.

== Studio albums ==
- Steve, Bob & Rich - Balls (1984, reissued 2006)
- The Rainmakers (1986) reached #85 on the Billboard 200
- Tornado (1987) reached #116 on the Billboard 200
- The Good News and the Bad News (1989)
- Flirting with the Universe (1994)
- Skin (1996)
- 25 on (2011)
- Monster Movie (2014)
- Cover Band (2015)

== Live albums ==
- Oslo-Wichita LIVE (April 1990)
- Thanksgiving 2011 (December 2011)

== Compilation albums ==
- The Best of the Rainmakers (1993)

== Singles ==
Year	Song	UK Singles Chart	US Billboard Mainstream Rock chart	Album	Formats	Comments
1986	"Let My People Go-Go"	18	-	The Rainmakers	7-inch, 12-inch	-
1986	"Downstream"	-	-	The Rainmakers	7-inch, 12-inch, CDV (1988)	-
1987	"Small Circles"	-	-	Tornado	7-inch, 12-inch, CD3, CD5	-
1988	"Snakedance"	-	31	Tornado	7-inch, 12-inch, CD5	UK only
1988	"No Romance"	-	-	Tornado	7-inch, 12-inch, CD5	Europe only
1989	"Spend It on Love"	-	-	The Good News and the Bad News	7-inch, CD5	-
1989	"Hoo Dee Hoo"	-	-	The Good News and the Bad News	7-inch	Norway only
1994	"Another Guitar"	-	-	Flirting with the Universe	CD5	Norway only
1996	"Different Rub"	-	-	Skin	CD5	-
1997	"Skin"	-	-	Skin	CD5	Norway only

== Other ==
- Checkin' In with The Rainmakers (1986, promotional tape)
- Live (1988, promotional CD recorded live at The Kennel Club, San Francisco, January 31, 1988)
- Hempilation, Vol. 2: Free the Weed (1998, Capricorn Records, The Rainmakers cover "One Toke Over the Line" with original artists Brewer & Shipley singing the long-lost third verse of the song)
