= Missouri Route 122 =

State highway in Missouri, U.S.

Route 122
- MO 122 highlighted in red

Route information
- Maintained by MoDOT
- Length: 4.936 mi (7.944 km)

Major junctions
- West end: VM Pinnacle Drive in Van Meter State Park
- East end: Route 41 / Route NN north of Marshall

Location
- Country: United States
- State: Missouri

Highway system
- Missouri State Highway System; Interstate; US; State; Supplemental
← Route 121	→ Route 123

Route 122 is a short highway in central Missouri. Its eastern terminus is at Route 41 in Fairville (the only town on the route), which is halfway between Miami and Marshall. The western terminus is at Van Meter State Park. The total length of the highway is about five miles (8 km).

== Route description ==
Route 122 begins within Van Meter State Park in Saline County, where the road continues north as VM Pinnacle Drive. From the western terminus, the route heads south as a two-lane undivided road, passing through wooded areas of the state park. The road leaves Van Meter State Park and enters agricultural areas. Route 122 turns to the east and continues to its eastern terminus at Route 41. Past this intersection, the road continues east as Route NN.

== Major intersections ==
The entire route is in Saline County.

Location	mi	km	Destinations	Notes
Van Meter State Park	0.000	0.000	VM Pinnacle Drive	
Marshall	4.936	7.944	Route 41 / Route NN east	
1.000 mi = 1.609 km; 1.000 km = 0.621 mi
