= Wakenda Township, Carroll County, Missouri =

Township in Carroll County, Missouri, US

Wakenda Township, Missouri
- Township
- Location of Wakenda Township, within Carroll County, Missouri
- Coordinates: 39°18′55″N 93°28′31″W
- Country: United States
- State: Missouri
- County: Carroll

Area
  - Total: 32.51 sq mi (84.2 km^{2})
  - Land: 31.67 sq mi (82.0 km^{2})
  - Water: 0.84 sq mi (2.2 km^{2})

Population (2020)
  - Total: 371
  - Density: 11.7/sq mi (4.52/km^{2})
- Time zone: UTC-6 (Central (CST))
  - Summer (DST): UTC-5 (CDT)
- GNIS feature ID: 766424

Wakenda Township is a township in Carroll County, in the U.S. state of Missouri. Wakenda Township has a population of 371 people according to the 2020 census.

Wakenda Township was named after Wakenda Creek.
