= Little Compton =

Little Compton may refer to:

- Little Compton, Missouri, United States
- Little Compton, Rhode Island, United States
- Little Compton, Warwickshire, United Kingdom
