= Bridge Creek =

Bridge Creek may refer to:

== Places in the United States ==
- Bridge Creek, Missouri
- Bridge Creek, Wisconsin
- Bridge Creek, Oklahoma
- Bridge Creek Township, Ouachita County, Arkansas

== Bodies of water ==
- Bridge Creek (British Columbia), Canada
- Bridge Creek (Fabius River tributary), a stream in Missouri, U.S.
- Bridge Creek (Oregon), a tributary of the John Day River, U.S.
  - Bridge Creek Wilderness
  - Bridge Creek Wildlife Area
- Bridge Creek, a tributary of the East Branch Wallenpaupack Creek in the Poconos of eastern Pennsylvania, U.S.
- Bridge Creek Reservoir, a lake in Kenai Peninsula Borough, Alaska, U.S.
- Bridge Creek Reservoir, a lake in Rosebud County, Montana, U.S.

== See also ==
- Bridges Creek, Virginia
- Bridge River (disambiguation)
