= Farmers Bank Building (Norborne, Missouri) =

- U.S. National Register of Historic Places
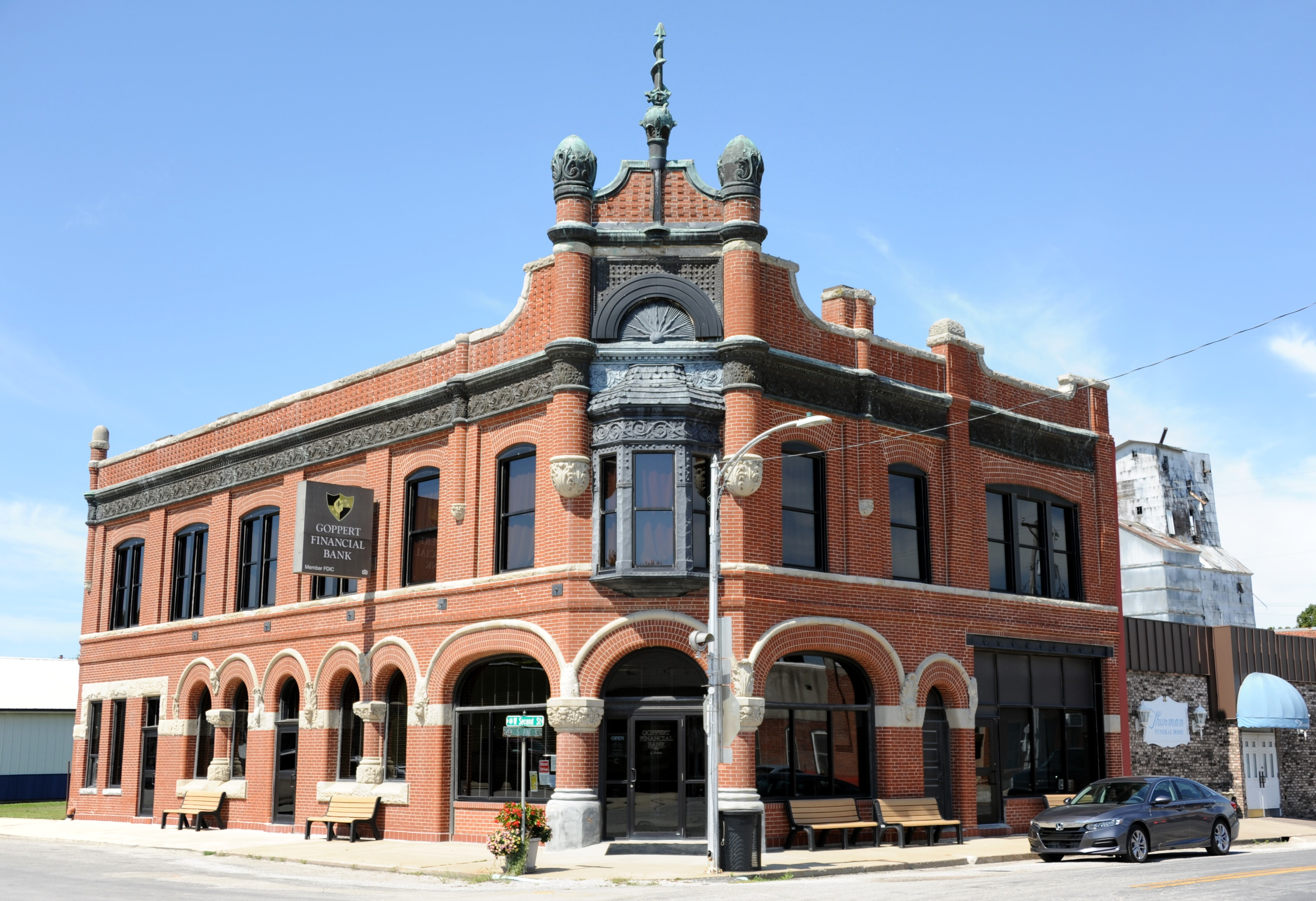

- Location within Missouri Location within the United States
- Location: 114 S. Pine St. Norborne, Missouri
- Coordinates: 39°18′10″N 93°40′36″W
- Area: less than one acre
- Built: c. 1892
- Architectural style: Romanesque
- NRHP reference No.: 94000702
- Added to NRHP: July 7, 1994

Farmers Bank Building, also known as the Citizens Bank of Norborne, is a historic bank building in Norborne, Carroll County, Missouri. It was built c. 1892, and is a two-story, Romanesque Revival style brick and cut-stone commercial building measuring 58 feet by 75 feet.

It was listed on the National Register of Historic Places in 1994.
