= Miami Station =

Miami Station may refer to:

- Railway stations in Miami, Florida
  - Miami station (Amtrak), the current Amtrak station on the outskirts of the city
  - Miami Intermodal Center, an intermodal station near Miami International Airport serving Metrorail, Tri-Rail, and the MIA Mover
  - MiamiCentral, a station in downtown serving Brightline, and also Metrorail and Metromover at the directly connected Government Center station
  - Miami station (Seaboard Air Line Railroad), former Seaboard Air Line Railroad and first Amtrak station
- Miami Station, Missouri, an unincorporated community in Missouri
- Miami Railway Station, a former railway station in Miami, Manitoba, now a railway museum and National Historic Site of Canada
