= Sugar tree =

Sugar tree may refer to:

- Acer saccharum, a maple commonly known as the sugar tree
- Sugartree, Missouri, an unincorporated community
- Sugar Tree, Tennessee, an unincorporated community in the United States
- Sugartree, an album by Jill Johnson

== See also ==
- Sugar Bush (disambiguation)
