= Cherry Valley Township =

Cherry Valley Township may refer to the following places in the United States:

- Cherry Valley Township, Winnebago County, Illinois
- Cherry Valley Township, Michigan
- Cherry Valley Township, Carroll County, Missouri
- Cherry Valley Township, Ohio
