= Leslie Township =

Leslie Township may refer to the following places in the United States:

- Leslie Township, Michigan
- Leslie Township, Todd County, Minnesota
- Leslie Township, Carroll County, Missouri
