= 25 On =

25 on

Studio album by The Rainmakers
- Released: 2011
- Recorded: January 24–28, 2011
- Studio: Largely Studios, Kansas City, Missouri
- Genre: Pop rock
- Length: 40:14
- Label: Bat Records
- Producer: The Rainmakers

The Rainmakers chronology
| Skin (1996) | 25 on (2011) | Thanksgiving 2011 (2011) |

25 on is the sixth studio album by The Rainmakers, released in on March 14, 2011.

In 2011, the Rainmakers reformed, with bassist Rich Ruth returning to the group, while longtime guitarist Steve Phillips was replaced by Jeff Porter. On March 5, the band was inducted into the Kansas Music Hall of Fame with a ceremony and concert at Liberty Hall in Lawrence, Kansas. The album 25 on was released on March 14. At the end of March, the band returned to Norway for a two-week tour. The band played two shows (May 14–15) at Knuckleheads Saloon in Kansas City. The second show was scheduled after the first show sold out very quickly.

== Track listing ==
All tracks written by Bob Walkenhorst.

1. "Given Time" – 2:54
2. "Vermillion" – 2:13
3. "My Own Bed" – 3:10
4. "Missouri Girl" – 2:38
5. "Half a Horse Apiece" – 3:04
6. "These Hills" – 3:46
7. "Kansas City Times" – 2:41
8. "Baby Grand" – 4:13
9. "Like Dogs" – 3:23
10. "Turpentine" – 3:22
11. "Last Song of the Evening" – 5:11
12. "Go Down Swinging" – 3:39

== Personnel ==
The Rainmakers

- Bob Walkenhorst – lead vocals, guitar
- Rich Ruth – bass guitar
- Pat Tomek – drums, vocals
- Jeff Porter – guitar, piano, vocals
