= Trotter Township, Carroll County, Missouri =

Township in Carroll County, Missouri, U.S.

Trotter Township, Missouri
- Township
- Location of Trotter Township, within Carroll County, Missouri
- Coordinates: 39.3886°N 93.5950°W
- Country: United States
- State: Missouri
- County: Carroll

Area
  - Total: 36.13 sq mi (93.6 km^{2})
  - Land: 36.13 sq mi (93.6 km^{2})
  - Water: 0.01 sq mi (0.026 km^{2})

Population (2020)
  - Total: 192
  - Density: 5.31/sq mi (2.05/km^{2})
- Time zone: UTC-6 (Central (CST))
  - Summer (DST): UTC-5 (CDT)
- GNIS feature ID: 766422

Trotter Township is a township in Carroll County, in the U.S. state of Missouri. Trotter Township has a population of 192 according to the 2020 census.

Trotter Township has the name of James Trotter, a county judge.
