= Egypt Township, Carroll County, Missouri =

Township in Missouri, United States

Egypt Township, Missouri
- Township
- Location of Egypt Township, within Carroll County, Missouri
- Coordinates: 39.3144°N 93.7111°W
- Country: United States
- State: Missouri
- County: Carroll

Area
  - Total: 55.11 sq mi (142.7 km^{2})
  - Land: 54.53 sq mi (141.2 km^{2})
  - Water: 0.58 sq mi (1.5 km^{2})

Population (2020)
  - Total: 783
  - Density: 14.4/sq mi (5.54/km^{2})
- Time zone: UTC-6 (Central (CST))
  - Summer (DST): UTC-5 (CDT)
- GNIS feature ID: 766409

Egypt Township is a township in Carroll County, in the U.S. state of Missouri. The population was 783 at the 2020 census.

Egypt Township was named after the country of Egypt.
