= Hill Township, Carroll County, Missouri =

Township in Carroll County, Missouri, U.S.

Hill Township, Missouri
- Township
- Location of Hill Township, within Carroll County, Missouri
- Coordinates: 39.5642°N 93.5986°W
- Country: United States
- State: Missouri
- County: Carroll

Area
  - Total: 35.83 sq mi (92.8 km^{2})
  - Land: 35.82 sq mi (92.8 km^{2})
  - Water: 0.01 sq mi (0.026 km^{2})

Population (2020)
  - Total: 188
  - Density: 5.25/sq mi (2.03/km^{2})
- Time zone: UTC-6 (Central (CST))
  - Summer (DST): UTC-5 (CDT)
- GNIS feature ID: 766412

Hill Township is a township in Carroll County, in the U.S. state of Missouri. The population was 188 at the 2020 census.

Hill Township has the name of the local Hill family of pioneer citizens.
