= Jah Roots =

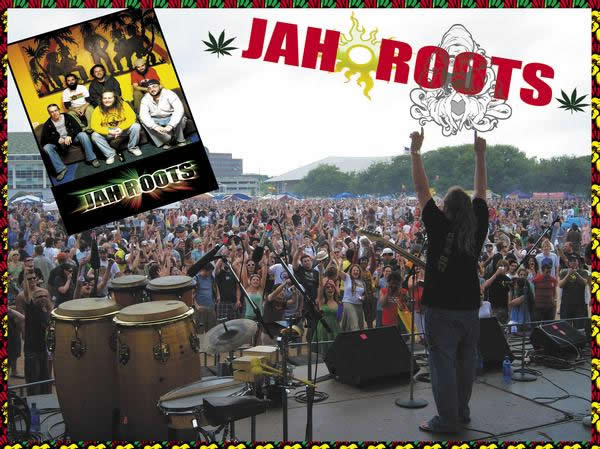
- Jah Roots at Austin, Texas Reggaefest

Background information
- Origin: Springfield, Missouri
- Genre: Reggae
- Years active: 2001–2009
- Label: GanJah Records

Jah Roots were a reggae band from Springfield, Missouri. The band was active from 2001 to 2009. They released several albums under the independent label GanJah Records, with a local and international following. Jah Roots broke up in 2009. Since then, lead singer Josh Heinrichs has established a successful solo career.

== History ==
Jah Roots recorded its first album, Steppin Out Of Babylon in 2002. In 2005 they released the albums More Herbs for the Youth and Babylon Weak Heart w/ Baddaflexx. Their fourth album titled Crucial was released in 2006, and was a Billboard Charts Top 100 Reggae album as well as being listed in the "Top Ten Reggae Albums of 2007" on the island of Guam. In April 2008 their fifth album Joy was released, charting on the "Billboard charts Top 100 Reggae Albums" as well. For this album they were joined by reggae guitarist Junior Marvin – who served as lead guitarist for Bob Marley & The Wailers from 1977-1980. Joy featured "Ganja Weed", which won "Best Reggae Song 2008" by the Global Marijuana Music Awards.

Jah Roots toured with Grammy Award winning artists, Damian Marley, Stephen Marley, and Bunny Wailer. They have shared the stage with Luciano (singer), George Clinton (funk musician), H.R., Morgan Heritage, EOTO, Soldiers of Jah Army, Groundation, The Itals, Anthony B, Culture (band), Capleton, The Beat (British band), Ky-Mani Marley and many other artists. They played at South by Southwest '07 & festivals such as Wakarusa Music and Camping Festival, Summer Camp Music Festival, Chicago Reggae Fest, Tulsa, Oklahoma Reggae Fest, Dayton, Ohio Reggae Fest, San Antonio Reggae Fest, Schwagstock and were regulars at the Austin Reggae Festival. The band toured regularly with Cas Haley from America's Got Talent

In 2008, Jah Roots appeared in American Music: Off the Record, a documentary examining the American music industry.

In Spring 2009, the band announced it was on "Indefinite Hiatus."

== Early distribution ==
Jah Roots initially promoted itself with free record distribution to build a wider audience base and increase concert attendance. Lead singer Josh Heinrichs is quoted in an interview as saying "Before MySpace... we were able to put our music up for free download online. We used to all go home and burn tons of copies of our albums off and give them away for free. We gave away thousands of CDs this way and it really made a huge difference in the attendance at our live shows and then when we were actually able to put out our first real album Crucial. Our fans were totally willing to help us out and throw down $10. They had already heard the music and liked it." The band also mailed CDs to fans in Europe, Asia, Africa and South America.

== Members ==
- Josh Heinrichs (lead vocals, guitar)
- Kyle "SkillinJah" Bell (dj/vocals 2002-2006)
- Steve "Cheese" Washburn (bass)
- Eric "Tico" Groves (drums)
- Josh Nail (percussion)
- Mike Hulsey (lead guitar/keyboards)
- Aaron "I-Ron" Berger (dj/vocals 2006-2008)
- Grant Maledy (saxophone)
- Phil Quidort (trumpet, trombone)

== Discography ==
- Steppin' Out Of Babylon (2002)
- More Herbs for the Youth (2005)
- Babylon Weak Heart w/ SkillinJah (2005)
- Crucial (2006)
- Joy (2008)
