= Plymouth, Missouri =

- Populated place
- Interactive map of Plymouth, Missouri
- Coordinates: 39°35′48″N 93°42′07″W
- Country: United States
- State: Missouri
- County: Carroll
- Elevation: 804 ft (245 m)
- Time zone: UTC-6 (Central (CST))
  - Summer (DST): UTC-5 (CDT)
- ZIP code: 64624
- Area code: 660
- FIPS code: 29-44390
- GNIS feature ID: 0724677

Plymouth is a populated place located in Carroll County, Missouri, United States. Plymouth is four miles south of Ludlow and five miles east of Braymer.

== History ==
Plymouth was laid out in 1881. The community was named after Plymouth, Massachusetts. A post office called Plymouth was established in 1877, and remained in operation until 1908.
