= Sugartree, Missouri =

Unincorporated community in Missouri, U.S.

Coordinates: 39°16′19″N 93°35′52″W

Sugartree is an unincorporated community in southwest Carroll County, in the U.S. state of Missouri.

The community is on County Road 510 two miles north of the Missouri River. Norborne is 4.5 miles to the northwest and Carrollton is eight miles to the northeast.

== History ==
A post office called Sugartree was established in 1884, and remained in operation until 1905. The community was named for a grove of sugar maple trees near the original town site.
