= Hurricane Township, Carroll County, Missouri =

Township in Carroll County, Missouri, U.S.

Hurricane Township, Missouri
- Township
- Location of Hurricane Township, within Carroll County, Missouri
- Coordinates: 39.5656°N 93.3406°W
- Country: United States
- State: Missouri
- County: Carroll

Area
  - Total: 48.05 sq mi (124.4 km^{2})
  - Land: 47.78 sq mi (123.7 km^{2})
  - Water: 0.27 sq mi (0.70 km^{2})

Population (2020)
  - Total: 605
  - Density: 12.7/sq mi (4.89/km^{2})
- Time zone: UTC-6 (Central (CST))
  - Summer (DST): UTC-5 (CDT)
- GNIS feature ID: 766413

Hurricane Township is a township in Carroll County, in the U.S. state of Missouri. The population was 605 at the 2020 census.

Hurricane Township took its name from Big Hurricane Creek.
