= Rockford Township, Carroll County, Missouri =

Township in Carroll County, Missouri, U.S.

Rockford Township, Missouri
- Township
- Location of Rockford Township, within Carroll County, Missouri
- Coordinates: 39.4764°N 93.2794°W
- Country: United States
- State: Missouri
- County: Carroll

Area
  - Total: 15.64 sq mi (40.5 km^{2})
  - Land: 15.32 sq mi (39.7 km^{2})
  - Water: 0.32 sq mi (0.83 km^{2})

Population (2020)
  - Total: 73
  - Density: 4.8/sq mi (1.8/km^{2})
- Time zone: UTC-6 (Central (CST))
  - Summer (DST): UTC-5 (CDT)
- GNIS feature ID: 766419

Rockford Township is a township in Carroll County, in the U.S. state of Missouri. The population was 73 at the 2020 census.

Rockford Township was named for a rocky ford on the Grand River.
