= The Rainmakers (album) =

Studio album by the Rainmakers
- Released: 1986
- Recorded: March–April 1986
- Studio: Ardent, Memphis, Tennessee
- Genre: Pop rock
- Length: 40:13
- Label: Mercury
- Producer: Terry Manning

The Rainmakers chronology
The Rainmakers (1986)	Tornado (1987)

Professional ratings
Review scores
Source	Rating
AllMusic	4.5/5 stars

The Rainmakers is the debut album by the Rainmakers, produced by Terry Manning and released in 1986. It is their highest-charting album on the Billboard albums chart, reaching No. 85, and contains the single "Let My People Go-Go", which reached No. 18 on the UK Singles Chart.

A remastered version of the album was released in 2010 with four additional tracks.

== Track listing ==
All tracks are written by Bob Walkenhorst except where noted.

No.	Title	Writer(s)	Length
1.	"Rockin' at the T-Dance"		3:19
2.	"Downstream"		3:32
3.	"Let My People Go-Go"		3:39
4.	"Doomsville"		4:30
5.	"Big Fat Blonde"		2:58
6.	"Long Gone Long"		4:09
7.	"The One That Got Away"		2:54
8.	"Government Cheese"		2:56
9.	"Drinkin' on the Job"		3:46
10.	"Nobody Knows"	Steve Phillips	3:33
11.	"Information"	Alan Clutter	4:52
12.	"Carpenter's Son (bonus track)"		3:29
13.	"Rockabilly Standard (bonus track)"	Jay Floyd	2:59
14.	"Long Gone Long (acoustic version) (bonus track)"		3:45
15.	"Doomsville (live) (bonus track)"		5:04

== Personnel ==
The Rainmakers

- Bob Walkenhorst - lead vocals, acoustic guitar
- Rich Ruth - bass, vocals
- Steve Phillips - electric guitar, vocals, lead vocal on "Nobody Knows"
- Pat Tomek - drums

Additional musicians

- Terry Manning - keyboards
- The Memphis Horns

== Charts ==
Chart (1986)	Peak position
US Billboard 200	85
Chart (1987)	Peak position
Australia (Kent Music Report)	91

Singles

Year	Single	Chart	Position
1987	"Let My People Go-Go"	UK Singles Chart	18
