= Moss Creek Township, Carroll County, Missouri =

Township in Carroll County, Missouri, U.S.

Moss Creek Township, Missouri
- Township
- Location of Moss Creek Township, within Carroll County, Missouri
- Coordinates: 39°18′36″N 93°35′17″W
- Country: United States
- State: Missouri
- County: Carroll

Area
  - Total: 36.48 sq mi (94.5 km^{2})
  - Land: 36.48 sq mi (94.5 km^{2})
  - Water: 0 sq mi (0 km^{2})

Population (2020)
  - Total: 96
  - Density: 2.6/sq mi (1.0/km^{2})
- Time zone: UTC-6 (Central (CST))
  - Summer (DST): UTC-5 (CDT)
- GNIS feature ID: 766416

Moss Creek Township is a township in Carroll County, in the U.S. state of Missouri. Moss Creek Township has a population of 96 according to the 2020 census.

Moss Creek Township took its name from Moss Creek, a creek noted for the moss lining its course.
