= Washington Township, Carroll County, Missouri =

Township in Carroll County, Missouri, U.S.

Washington Township, Missouri
- Township
- Location of Washington Township, within Carroll County, Missouri
- Coordinates: 39.5647°N 93.7133°W
- Country: United States
- State: Missouri
- County: Carroll

Area
  - Total: 36.14 sq mi (93.6 km^{2})
  - Land: 36.14 sq mi (93.6 km^{2})
  - Water: 0.001 sq mi (0.0026 km^{2})

Population (2020)
  - Total: 177
  - Density: 4.90/sq mi (1.89/km^{2})
- Time zone: UTC-6 (Central (CST))
  - Summer (DST): UTC-5 (CDT)
- GNIS feature ID: 766425

Washington Township is a township in Carroll County, in the U.S. state of Missouri. Washington Township has a population of 177 according to the 2020 census.

Washington Township has the name of President George Washington.
