= Standish, Missouri =

Unincorporated community in Missouri, U.S.

Coordinates: 39°23′04″N 93°25′46″W

Standish is an unincorporated community in Carroll County, in the U.S. state of Missouri.

A post office called Standish was established in 1888, and remained in operation until 1955. A variant name was "Newcomb".
