= Coloma, Missouri =

Unincorporated community in Missouri, U.S.

Coordinates: 39°31′53″N 93°31′24″W

Coloma is an unincorporated community in Carroll County, Missouri, United States.

== History ==
Coloma was laid out in 1858, and most likely was named after Coloma, California. A post office called Coloma was established in 1861, and remained in operation until 1907. With construction of the railroad in the 1880s, business activity shifted to other nearby places, and Coloma's population declined.
