= Sugartree Township, Carroll County, Missouri =

Township in Carroll County, Missouri, U.S.

Sugartree Township, Missouri
- Township
- Location of Sugartree Township, within Carroll County, Missouri
- Coordinates: 39.2400°N 93.5592°W
- Country: United States
- State: Missouri
- County: Carroll

Area
  - Total: 21.6 sq mi (56 km^{2})
  - Land: 20.53 sq mi (53.2 km^{2})
  - Water: 1.08 sq mi (2.8 km^{2})

Population (2020)
  - Total: 19
  - Density: 0.93/sq mi (0.36/km^{2})
- Time zone: UTC-6 (Central (CST))
  - Summer (DST): UTC-5 (CDT)
- GNIS feature ID: 766421

Sugartree Township is a township in Carroll County, in the U.S. state of Missouri. Sugartree Township has a population of 19 according to the 2020 census.

Sugartree Township was named for the sugar maple trees within its borders.
