= Van Horn Township, Carroll County, Missouri =

Township in Carroll County, Missouri, U.S.

Van Horn Township, Missouri
- Township
- Location of Van Horn Township, within Carroll County, Missouri
- Coordinates: 39°29′07″N 93°28′36″W
- Country: United States
- State: Missouri
- County: Carroll

Area
  - Total: 35.6 sq mi (92 km^{2})
  - Land: 35.58 sq mi (92.2 km^{2})
  - Water: 0.02 sq mi (0.052 km^{2})

Population (2020)
  - Total: 426
  - Density: 12.0/sq mi (4.62/km^{2})
- Time zone: UTC-6 (Central (CST))
  - Summer (DST): UTC-5 (CDT)
- GNIS feature ID: 766423

Van Horn Township is a township in Carroll County, in the U.S. state of Missouri. Van Horn Township has a population of 426 according to the 2020 census.

Van Horn Township has the name of Robert T. Van Horn, a state legislator.
