= De Witt Township, Carroll County, Missouri =

Township in Carroll County, Missouri, U.S.

De Witt Township, Missouri
- Township
- Location of De Witt Township, within Carroll County, Missouri
- Coordinates: 39.4017°N 93.2281°W
- Country: United States
- State: Missouri
- County: Carroll

Area
  - Total: 46.12 sq mi (119.5 km^{2})
  - Land: 44.60 sq mi (115.5 km^{2})
  - Water: 1.52 sq mi (3.9 km^{2})

Population (2020)
  - Total: 260
  - Density: 5.8/sq mi (2.3/km^{2})
- Time zone: UTC-6 (Central (CST))
  - Summer (DST): UTC-5 (CDT)
- GNIS feature ID: 766408

De Witt Township is a township in Carroll County, in the U.S. state of Missouri. The population was 260 at the 2020 census.

De Witt Township was established in 1872, and named after De Witt, Missouri.
