= Mandeville, Missouri =

Unincorporated community in Missouri, U.S.

Coordinates: 39°29′47″N 93°37′16″W

Mandeville is an unincorporated community in Carroll County, in the U.S. state of Missouri.

== History ==
A post office called Mandeville was established in 1854, and remained in operation until 1903. The community derives its name from Amanda Shirley, the love interest of an early settler.
