= Combs Township, Carroll County, Missouri =

Township in Carroll County, Missouri, U.S.

Combs Township, Missouri
- Township
- Location of Combs Township, within Carroll County, Missouri
- Coordinates: 39.3950°N 93.3611°W
- Country: United States
- State: Missouri
- County: Carroll

Area
  - Total: 35.29 sq mi (91.4 km^{2})
  - Land: 35.28 sq mi (91.4 km^{2})
  - Water: 0.01 sq mi (0.026 km^{2})

Population (2020)
  - Total: 250
  - Density: 7.1/sq mi (2.7/km^{2})
- Time zone: UTC-6 (Central (CST))
  - Summer (DST): UTC-5 (CDT)
- GNIS feature ID: 766407

Combs Township is a township in Carroll County, in the U.S. state of Missouri. Combs Township has a population of 250 according to the 2020 census.

Combs Township was erected in 1872, and named after Colonel Howard T. Combs, a county official.
