= Bridge River (disambiguation) =

The Bridge River is a major tributary of the Fraser River in British Columbia, Canada

Bridge River can also refer to a number of other topics related to the Bridge River including:

- Bridge River Country, a historic geographic region and mining district in British Columbia, Canada
- Bridge River, British Columbia, the name of three separate towns or localities connected with the Bridge River and its valley
- Bridge River Indian Band, a First Nations government in British Columbia, Canada
- Bridge River Canyon, a 15 km (9 mi) gorge on the river separating the Shulaps Range and Mission Ridge
- Bridge River Power Project, a hydroelectric power development involving the river
- Bridge River Cones, a volcanic field located in the uppermost basin of the river
- Bridge River Ash, a large volcanic ash deposit that spans from southwestern British Columbia to central Alberta, Canada
- Bridge River Ocean, an ancient ocean in the area of what is now the Interior of British Columbia
- Bridge River Delta Provincial Park, a provincial park located on the river's upper reaches
- Bridge River (Yukon) is a tributary of the Tatshenshini River

== See also ==
- Bridge Creek (disambiguation)
