= Prairie Township, Carroll County, Missouri =

Township in Carroll County, Missouri, U.S.

Prairie Township, Missouri
- Township
- Location of Prairie Township, within Carroll County, Missouri
- Coordinates: 39.3906°N 93.7086°W
- Country: United States
- State: Missouri
- County: Carroll

Area
  - Total: 36.45 sq mi (94.4 km^{2})
  - Land: 36.39 sq mi (94.2 km^{2})
  - Water: 0.05 sq mi (0.13 km^{2})

Population (2020)
  - Total: 148
  - Density: 4.07/sq mi (1.57/km^{2})
- Time zone: UTC-6 (Central (CST))
  - Summer (DST): UTC-5 (CDT)
- GNIS feature ID: 766417

Prairie Township is a township in Carroll County, in the U.S. state of Missouri. The population was 148 at the 2020 census.

Prairie Township was named for the prairies within its borders.
