= Grace, Carroll County, Missouri =

Unincorporated community in Missouri, U.S.

Coordinates: 39°36′03″N 93°26′26″W

Grace is an unincorporated community in Carroll County, in the U.S. state of Missouri.

== History ==
A post office called Grace was established in 1893, and remained in operation until 1902. The community was named after a nearby church.
