= Regal, Missouri =

Unincorporated community in Missouri, U.S.

Coordinates: 39°28′03″N 93°48′53″W

Regal is an unincorporated community in northeast Ray County, in the U.S. state of Missouri.

The community is at the intersection of Missouri routes A and W approximately fifteen miles northeast of Richmond. Wakenda Creek flows past one mile to the southwest of the community.

== History ==
A post office called Regal was established in 1899, and remained in operation until 1904. The community was named Regal on account of the name's brevity.
