= Miles Point, Missouri =

Unincorporated community in Missouri, U.S.

Coordinates: 39°13′52″N 93°41′58″W

Miles Point is an unincorporated community in Carroll County, in the U.S. state of Missouri.

== History ==
Miles Point was laid out in 1855 by Jonathan Miles, and named for him. A post office called Miles Point was established in 1858, and remained in operation until 1903.
