= Sugar Bush =

Sugar Bush may refer to:

- Sugar bush, a forest that is harvested for maple syrup.

== Plants ==
- Sugar Bush (Rhus ovata), an evergreen shrub that grows in the southwest United States
- Common Sugarbush Protea (Protea repens)
- Protea, a genus of South African flowering shrubs often known as sugarbushes

== Places ==
=== United States ===
- Sugar Bush Township, Becker County, Minnesota
- Sugar Bush Township, Beltrami County, Minnesota
- Sugar Bush, Brown County, Wisconsin, an unincorporated community
- Sugarbush Hill, a peak in Forest County, Wisconsin
- Sugar Bush, Outagamie County, Wisconsin, an unincorporated community
- Sugarbush Resort, a ski resort in Vermont

== Other uses ==
- Sugar Bush (song), a song recorded by Doris Day and Frankie Laine

== See also ==
- Sugartree (disambiguation)
