= Tornado (The Rainmakers album) =

Studio album by the Rainmakers
- Released: 1987
- Recorded: May–July 1987
- Studios: Ardent, Memphis, Tennessee
- Genres: Rock, heartland rock
- Length: 41:07
- Label: Mercury
- Producer: Terry Manning

The Rainmakers chronology
The Rainmakers (1986)	Tornado (1987)	The Good News and the Bad News (1989)

Tornado is the second studio album by the American band the Rainmakers, released in 1987. It reached No. 116 on the Billboard 200. The band supported the album with a North American tour. "The Lakeview Man" is about a Vietnam veteran.

A remastered version of the album was released in 2012, with eight additional tracks.

== Critical reception ==
Professional ratings
Review scores
Source	Rating
AllMusic	4.0/5 stars
Los Angeles Times	3/4 stars

The Chicago Tribune wrote that the album "offers more thought-provoking rock and roll that recalls the lyrics of T-Bone Burnett and the sound of Creedence Clearwater Revival and the early Rolling Stones." The Los Angeles Times noted that "Bob Walkenhorst's characters are generally the same kind of small-town folk as in [John Cougar] Mellencamp's world, but aren't as stereotyped." USA Today said that "songs like 'Snakedance' and 'Tornado of Love' sound terrific—if a bit familiar—but the lyrics are too transparent."

== Track listing ==
All tracks written by Bob Walkenhorst except where noted.

1. "Snakedance" – 4:02
2. "Tornado of Love" – 4:15
3. "The Wages of Sin" – 3:42
4. "Small Circles" – 3:28
5. "No Romance" – 3:35
6. "One More Summer" – 3:34
7. "The Lakeview Man" – 3:02
8. "Rainmaker" – 4:29
9. "I Talk with My Hands" – 6:33
10. "The Other Side of the World" – 4:27

Bonus tracks on 2012 remastered CD

1. "Stick Together" – 4:43
2. "Rockin' Around" (Steve Phillips) – 3:31
3. "Stupid Way to Die" – 3:39
4. "Small Circles" [acoustic] – 3:00
5. "Task" – 4:14
6. "He Yells at the Birds" – 3:48
7. "My Days Are Numbered" – 3:22
8. "Kisses from St. Louis" – 2:30

== Personnel ==
The Rainmakers

- Bob Walkenhorst – lead vocals, guitars, keyboards
- Rich Ruth – bass, vocals
- Steve Phillips – lead guitars, vocals
- Pat Tomek – drums

Additional musicians

- Terry Manning – keyboards

== Charts ==
Chart (1987)	Peak position
Billboard 200	116
