= Roads, Missouri =

Unincorporated community in Missouri, U.S.

Coordinates: 39°28′00″N 93°42′05″W

Roads (also known as Rhoads) is an unincorporated community in Carroll County, in the U.S. state of Missouri.

== History ==
A post office called Roads was established in 1883, and remained in operation until 1907. The community derives its name from A. F. Rhoads, an early citizen.
