= Carroll County, Missouri =

County in Missouri, United States

- County
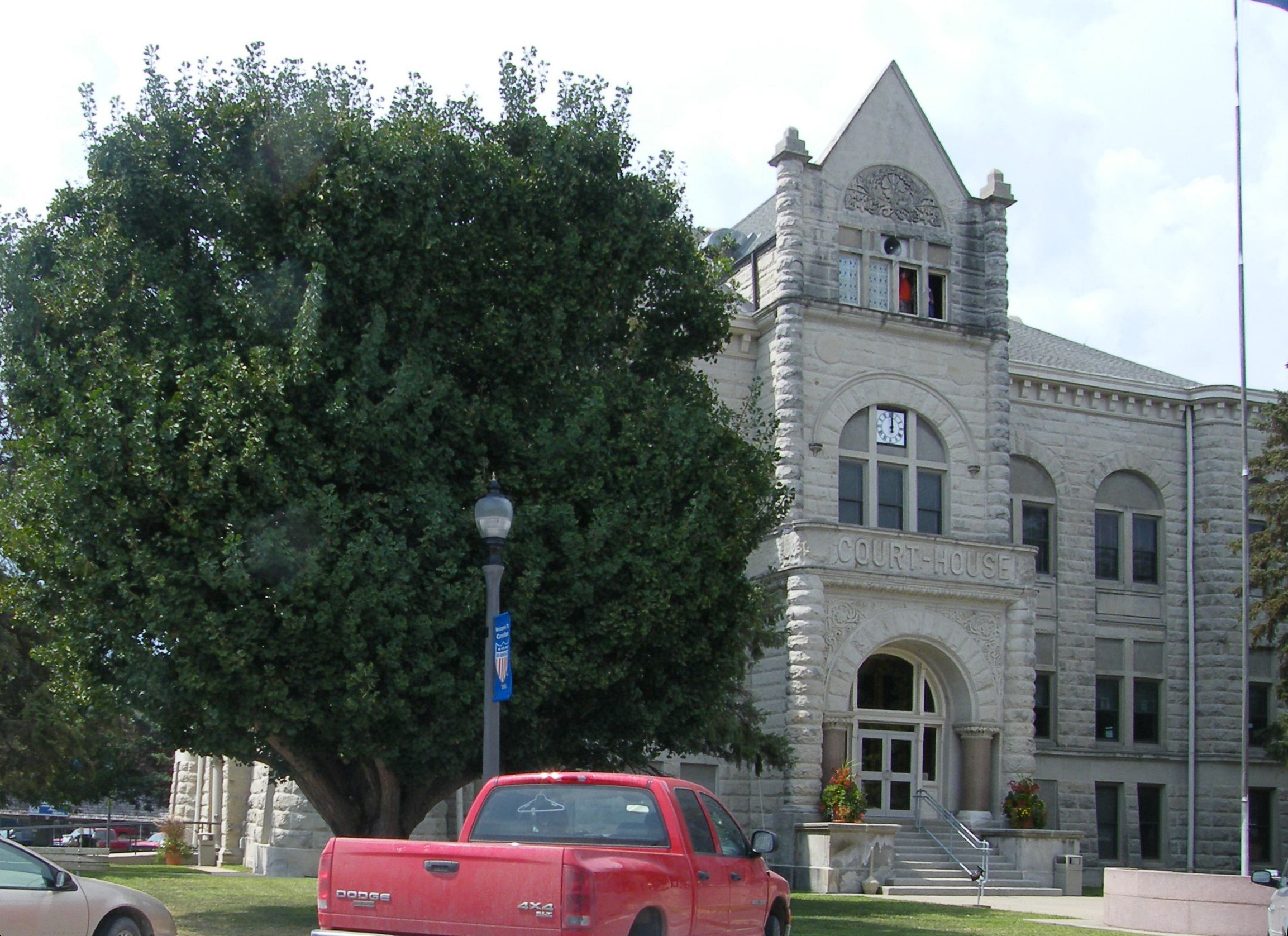
- Carroll County Courthouse in Carrollton

- Location within the U.S. state of Missouri
- Coordinates: 39°26′N 93°30′W
- Country: United States
- State: Missouri
- Founded: January 2, 1833
- Named for: Charles Carroll of Carrollton
- Seat: Carrollton
- Largest city: Carrollton

Area
  - Total: 701 sq mi (1,820 km^{2})
  - Land: 695 sq mi (1,800 km^{2})
  - Water: 6.8 sq mi (18 km^{2}) 1.0%

Population (2020)
  - Total: 8,495
  - Estimate (2025): 8,417 ▼
  - Density: 12.2/sq mi (4.72/km^{2})
- Time zone: UTC−6 (Central)
  - Summer (DST): UTC−5 (CDT)
- Congressional district: 6th
- Website: www.carrollcountymo.gov

Carroll County is a county located in the U.S. state of Missouri. As of the 2020 census, the county had a population of 8,495. Its county seat is Carrollton. The county was organized on January 2, 1833, from part of Ray County and named for Charles Carroll of Carrollton, a signer of the Declaration of Independence.

== Geography ==
According to the U.S. Census Bureau, the county has a total area of 701 square miles (1,820 km^{2}), of which 695 square miles (1,800 km^{2}) is land and 6.8 square miles (18 km^{2}) (1.0%) is water.

=== Adjacent counties ===
- Livingston County (north)
- Chariton County (east)
- Saline County (southeast)
- Lafayette County (southwest)
- Ray County (west)
- Caldwell County (northwest)

=== Major highways ===
- U.S. Route 24
- U.S. Route 65
- Route 10
- Route 41
- Route 139

== Demographics ==
Historical population
Census	Pop.	Note	%±
1840	2,423		—
1850	5,441		124.6%
1860	9,763		79.4%
1870	17,446		78.7%
1880	23,274		33.4%
1890	25,742		10.6%
1900	26,455		2.8%
1910	23,098		−12.7%
1920	20,480		−11.3%
1930	19,940		−2.6%
1940	17,814		−10.7%
1950	15,589		−12.5%
1960	13,847		−11.2%
1970	12,565		−9.3%
1980	12,131		−3.5%
1990	10,748		−11.4%
2000	10,285		−4.3%
2010	9,295		−9.6%
2020	8,495		−8.6%
2025 (est.)	8,417	▼	−0.9%
U.S. Decennial Census; 1790-1960 1900-1990; 1990-2000 2010-2020

=== Religion ===
According to the Association of Religion Data Archives County Membership Report (2010), Carroll County is sometimes regarded as being on the northern edge of the Bible Belt, with evangelical Protestantism being the most predominant religion. The most predominant denominations among residents in Carroll County who adhere to a religion are Southern Baptists (55.73%), United Methodists (11.01%), and Lutherans (LCMS) (9.69%).

=== 2020 census ===
As of the 2020 census, the county had a population of 8,495. The median age was 44.9 years, 21.6% of residents were under the age of 18, and 23.3% were 65 years of age or older. There were 98.9 males for every 100 females and 96.3 males for every 100 females age 18 and over.

The racial makeup of the county was 93.5% White, 1.1% Black or African American, 0.2% American Indian and Alaska Native, 0.2% Asian, 0.0% Native Hawaiian and Pacific Islander, 0.5% from some other race, and 4.4% from two or more races. Hispanic or Latino residents of any race comprised 1.6% of the population.

0.0% of residents lived in urban areas, while 100.0% lived in rural areas.

There were 3,569 households in the county, of which 27.2% had children under the age of 18 living with them and 23.9% had a female householder with no spouse or partner present. About 30.2% of all households were made up of individuals and 16.1% had someone living alone who was 65 years of age or older.

There were 4,364 housing units, of which 18.2% were vacant. Among occupied housing units, 75.0% were owner-occupied and 25.0% were renter-occupied. The homeowner vacancy rate was 2.3% and the rental vacancy rate was 13.7%.

=== 2000 census ===
As of the census of 2000, there were 10,285 people, 4,169 households, and 2,880 families residing in the county. The population density was 15 people per square mile (5.8 people/km^{2}). There were 4,897 housing units at an average density of 7 units per square mile (2.7/km^{2}). The racial makeup of the county was 96.95% white, 1.72% Black or African American, 0.27% Native American, 0.13% Asian, 0.01% Pacific Islander, 0.14% from other races, and 0.79% from two or more races. Approximately 0.71% of the population were Hispanic or Latino of any race. 32.7% were of German, 25.3% American, 11.8% English and 9.2% Irish ancestry.

There were 4,169 households, out of which 30.20% had children under the age of 18 living with them, 57.40% were married couples living together, 8.00% had a female householder with no husband present, and 30.90% were non-families. 27.80% of all households were made up of individuals, and 15.50% had someone living alone who was 65 years of age or older. The average household size was 2.42 and the average family size was 2.96.

In the county, the population was spread out, with 25.20% under the age of 18, 7.40% from 18 to 24, 24.50% from 25 to 44, 22.90% from 45 to 64, and 20.10% who were 65 years of age or older. The median age was 40 years. For every 100 females there were 94.20 males. For every 100 females age 18 and over, there were 90.40 males.

The median income for a household in the county was $30,643, and the median income for a family was $36,773. Males had a median income of $26,135 versus $17,468 for females. The per capita income for the county was $15,522. About 9.70% of families and 13.70% of the population were below the poverty line, including 17.00% of those under age 18 and 12.80% of those age 65 or over.

=== Racial and ethnic composition ===
Carroll County, Missouri – Racial and ethnic composition Note: the US Census treats Hispanic/Latino as an ethnic category. This table excludes Latinos from the racial categories and assigns them to a separate category. Hispanics/Latinos may be of any race.
Race / Ethnicity (NH = Non-Hispanic)	Pop 1980	Pop 1990	Pop 2000	Pop 2010	Pop 2020	% 1980	% 1990	% 2000	% 2010	% 2020
White alone (NH)	11,753	10,460	9,919	8,893	7,906	96.88%	97.32%	96.44%	95.68%	93.07%
Black or African American alone (NH)	267	219	177	149	97	2.20%	2.04%	1.72%	1.60%	1.14%
Native American or Alaska Native alone (NH)	12	13	28	21	15	0.10%	0.12%	0.27%	0.23%	0.18%
Asian alone (NH)	17	11	13	10	15	0.14%	0.10%	0.13%	0.11%	0.18%
Native Hawaiian or Pacific Islander alone (NH)	x	x	1	8	0	x	x	0.01%	0.09%	0.00%
Other race alone (NH)	7	5	1	1	6	0.06%	0.05%	0.01%	0.01%	0.07%
Mixed race or Multiracial (NH)	x	x	73	95	324	x	x	0.71%	1.02%	3.81%
Hispanic or Latino (any race)	75	40	73	118	132	0.62%	0.37%	0.71%	1.27%	1.55%
Total	12,131	10,748	10,285	9,295	8,495	100.00%	100.00%	100.00%	100.00%	100.00%

== Education ==
School districts include:

- Bosworth R-V School District
- Braymer C-4 School District
- Brunswick R-II School District
- Carrollton R-VII School District
- Hale R-I School District
- Norborne R-VIII School District
- Tina-Avalon R-II School District

=== Public schools ===
- Bosworth R-V School District – Bosworth
  - Bosworth Elementary School (PK-06)
  - Bosworth High School (07–12)
- Carrollton R-VII School District – Carrollton
  - Adams-Dieterich Elementary School (K-04)
  - Adams Primary School (PK-01)
  - Carrollton Elementary School (02–04)
  - Carrollton Middle School (05–08)
  - Carrollton High School (09–12)
- Hale R-I School District – Hale
  - Hale Elementary School (PK-06)
  - Hale High School (07–12)
- Norborne R-VIII School District – Norborne
  - Norborne Elementary School (K-05)
  - Norborne High School (06–12)
- Tina-Avalon R-II School District – Tina
  - Tina-Avalon Elementary School (PK-06)
  - Tina-Avalon High School (07–12)

=== Public libraries ===
- Carrollton Public Library
- Norborne Public Library

== Communities ==
=== Cities ===
- Bogard
- Bosworth
- Carrollton (county seat)
- De Witt
- Hale
- Norborne

=== Village ===
- Tina

=== Unincorporated communities ===
- Bridge Creek
- Coloma
- Grace
- Little Compton
- Mandeville
- Miami Station
- Miles Point
- Plymouth
- Roads
- Standish
- Stet
- Sugartree
- Wakenda
- White Rock

=== Townships ===
- Carrollton Township
- Cherry Valley Township
- Combs Township
- De Witt Township
- Egypt Township
- Eugene Township
- Fairfield Township
- Hill Township
- Hurricane Township
- Leslie Township
- Moss Creek Township
- Prairie Township
- Ridge Township
- Rockford Township
- Stokes Mound Township
- Sugartree Township
- Trotter Township
- Van Horn Township
- Wakenda Township
- Washington Township

== Notable people ==
- Lewis Eldon Atherton, historian at the University of Missouri
- Amanda Austin, painter and sculptor
- Leon E. Bates, UAW leader
- James Johnson Duderstadt, President of the University of Michigan (1988–1996)
- James Fergason, inventor and business leader in electronics known for work with LCD
- Francis Doyle Gleeson, Roman Catholic bishop
- Don Martin, NFL player and coach
- John C. McQueen, Major general, USMC, decorated veteran of World War II
- James Shields, only person in U.S. history to serve in the United States Senate representing three different states: Illinois (1849–1849; 1849–1855), Minnesota (1858–1859), and Missouri (1879–1879)
- Robert Simpson, athlete
- Barbara Sinatra, wife of Zeppo Marx and later Frank Sinatra
- Claude T. Smith, American band conductor, composer, and educator
- Bryan Andrews, American country singer, musician, and progressive activist.

== Politics ==
=== Local ===
The Republican Party predominantly controls politics at the local level in Carroll County. Republicans hold all but three of the elected positions in the county.

Carroll County, Missouri

Elected countywide officials
Assessor	Devin Ford Frazier	Republican
Circuit Clerk	Janet Horine	Republican
County Clerk	Petal J. Stanley	Republican
Commissioner (presiding)	Stan Falke	Republican
Commissioner (district 1)	Everett Shields	Republican
Commissioner (district 2)	Charles Pence	Republican
Coroner	Steven W. Bittiker	Republican
Prosecuting Attorney	Cassandra Brown	Democratic
Public Administrator	Brenda West	Independent
Recorder	Janet Horine	Republican
Sheriff	William McCoy	Republican
Surveyor	Marc Magee	Republican
Treasurer/Collector	Megan Endicott	Democratic

Following the August 2024 primary, the Republican candidates for District 1 County Commissioner, Everett Shields, and District 2 County Commissioner, Charles Pence, faced no Democratic challengers in the general election.

=== State ===
Past Gubernatorial Elections Results
Year	Republican	Democratic	Third Parties
2024	81.27% 3,623	16.94% 754	1.81% 81
2020	81.61% 3,671	17.12% 770	1.27% 57
2016	65.31% 2,837	32.04% 1,392	2.65% 115
2012	52.91% 2,256	44.61% 1,902	2.48% 106
2008	49.48% 2,233	48.77% 2,201	1.75% 79
2004	60.13% 2,828	38.91% 1,830	0.96% 45
2000	57.71% 2,643	40.87% 1,872	1.42% 65
1996	36.21% 1,625	62.25% 2,794	1.54% 69

All of Carroll County is a part of Missouri's 39th District in the Missouri House of Representatives and is currently represented by Peggy McGaugh (R-Carrollton).

Missouri House of Representatives — District 39 — Carroll County (2020)
Party	Candidate	Votes	%	±%
Republican	Peggy McGaugh	4,138	100.00%	+22.08

Missouri House of Representatives — District 39 — Carroll County (2018)
Party	Candidate	Votes	%	±%
Republican	Peggy McGaugh	2,872	77.92%	+1.60
Democratic	Rick Mellon	814	22.08%	−1.60

All of Carroll County is a part of Missouri's 21st District in the Missouri Senate and is currently represented by Denny Hoskins (R-Warrensburg).

Missouri Senate — District 21 — Carroll County (2020)
Party	Candidate	Votes	%	±%
Republican	Denny Hoskins	3,809	88.50%	+8.61
Libertarian	Mark Bliss	495	11.50%	+7.88

Missouri Senate — District 21 — Carroll County (2016)
Party	Candidate	Votes	%	±%
Republican	Denny Hoskins	3,353	79.89%	+7.21
Democratic	ElGene Ver Dught	692	16.49%	−6.95
Libertarian	Bill Wayne	152	3.62%	−0.26

=== Federal ===
All of Carroll County is included in Missouri's 6th Congressional District and is currently represented by Sam Graves (R-Tarkio) in the U.S. House of Representatives. Graves was elected to an eleventh term in 2020 over Democratic challenger Gena Ross.

U.S. House of Representatives – Missouri’s 6th Congressional District – Carroll County (2020)
Party	Candidate	Votes	%	±%
Republican	Sam Graves	3,772	84.46%	
Democratic	Gena L. Ross	639	14.31%	
Libertarian	Jim Higgins	55	1.23%	

U.S. House of Representatives – Missouri's 6th Congressional District – Carroll County (2018)
Party	Candidate	Votes	%	±%
Republican	Sam Graves	3,064	82.37%	
Democratic	Henry Robert Martin	569	15.30%	
Libertarian	Dan Hogan	87	2.34%	

Carroll County, along with the rest of the state of Missouri, is represented in the U.S. Senate by Josh Hawley (R-Columbia) and Roy Blunt (R-Strafford).

U.S. Senate – Class I – Carroll County (2018)
Party	Candidate	Votes	%	±%
Republican	Josh Hawley	2,761	73.75%	+27.99
Democratic	Claire McCaskill	870	23.24%	−22.04
Independent	Craig O'Dear	58	1.55%	
Libertarian	Japheth Campbell	34	0.91%	−8.02
Green	Jo Crain	21	0.56%	+0.56

Blunt was elected to a second term in 2016 over then-Missouri Secretary of State Jason Kander.

U.S. Senate — Missouri — Carroll County (2016)
Party	Candidate	Votes	%	±%
Republican	Roy Blunt	2,875	66.20%	+20.43
Democratic	Jason Kander	1,290	29.70%	−15.59
Libertarian	Jonathan Dine	100	2.30%	−6.64
Green	Johnathan McFarland	38	0.87%	+0.87
Constitution	Fred Ryman	40	0.92%	+0.92

==== Political culture ====
United States presidential election results for Carroll County, Missouri
Year	Republican		Democratic		Third party(ies)	
Year	No.	%	No.	%	No.	%
1888	2,929	47.71%	2,906	47.34%	304	4.95%
1892	2,896	46.51%	2,969	47.68%	362	5.81%
1896	3,363	48.16%	3,555	50.91%	65	0.93%
1900	3,192	48.33%	3,300	49.96%	113	1.71%
1904	3,032	51.67%	2,673	45.55%	163	2.78%
1908	3,015	51.55%	2,753	47.07%	81	1.38%
1912	1,519	26.85%	2,648	46.80%	1,491	26.35%
1916	2,978	50.65%	2,822	48.00%	79	1.34%
1920	5,609	57.35%	4,075	41.67%	96	0.98%
1924	4,907	51.05%	4,502	46.83%	204	2.12%
1928	5,875	61.05%	3,735	38.81%	14	0.15%
1932	3,894	43.25%	5,072	56.34%	37	0.41%
1936	5,432	51.22%	5,141	48.48%	32	0.30%
1940	6,000	57.38%	4,446	42.52%	11	0.11%
1944	5,127	60.82%	3,283	38.94%	20	0.24%
1948	4,212	55.29%	3,401	44.64%	5	0.07%
1952	5,410	63.14%	3,146	36.72%	12	0.14%
1956	4,751	58.06%	3,432	41.94%	0	0.00%
1960	4,555	58.02%	3,296	41.98%	0	0.00%
1964	2,994	42.39%	4,069	57.61%	0	0.00%
1968	3,680	54.13%	2,473	36.38%	645	9.49%
1972	4,100	68.03%	1,927	31.97%	0	0.00%
1976	2,936	48.31%	3,114	51.24%	27	0.44%
1980	3,291	58.95%	2,130	38.15%	162	2.90%
1984	3,495	63.84%	1,980	36.16%	0	0.00%
1988	2,811	54.59%	2,330	45.25%	8	0.16%
1992	1,774	32.99%	2,100	39.05%	1,504	27.97%
1996	1,839	40.73%	2,080	46.07%	596	13.20%
2000	2,880	62.87%	1,620	35.36%	81	1.77%
2004	3,155	66.55%	1,568	33.07%	18	0.38%
2008	2,955	65.12%	1,535	33.83%	48	1.06%
2012	3,072	71.38%	1,154	26.81%	78	1.81%
2016	3,480	79.80%	745	17.08%	136	3.12%
2020	3,706	81.77%	786	17.34%	40	0.88%
2024	3,708	81.89%	789	17.42%	31	0.68%

At the presidential level, Carroll County has become solidly Republican in recent years. Carroll County strongly favored Donald Trump in both 2016 and 2020. Bill Clinton was the last Democratic presidential nominee to carry Carroll County in 1996 with a plurality of the vote, and a Democrat hasn't won majority support from the county's voters in a presidential election since Jimmy Carter in 1976.

Like most rural areas throughout Missouri, voters in Carroll County generally adhere to socially and culturally conservative principles which tend to influence their Republican leanings. Despite Carroll County's longstanding tradition of supporting socially conservative platforms, voters in the county have a penchant for advancing populist causes. In 2018, Missourians voted on a proposition (Proposition A) concerning right to work, the outcome of which ultimately reversed the right to work legislation passed in the state the previous year. 63.63% of Carroll County voters cast their ballots to overturn the law.

=== Missouri presidential preference primaries ===
==== 2020 ====
The 2020 presidential primaries for both the Democratic and Republican parties were held in Missouri on March 10. On the Democratic side, former Vice President Joe Biden (D-Delaware) both won statewide and carried Carroll County by a wide margin. Biden went on to defeat President Donald Trump in the general election.

Missouri Democratic Presidential Primary – Carroll County (2020)
Party	Candidate	Votes	%	±%
Democratic	Joe Biden	306	66.09	
Democratic	Bernie Sanders	127	27.43	
Democratic	Tulsi Gabbard	7	1.51	
Democratic	Others/Uncommitted	23	4.97	

Incumbent President Donald Trump (R-Florida) faced a primary challenge from former Massachusetts Governor Bill Weld, but won both Carroll County and statewide by overwhelming margins.

Missouri Republican Presidential Primary – Carroll County (2020)
Party	Candidate	Votes	%	±%
Republican	Donald Trump	737	98.53	
Republican	Bill Weld	3	0.40	
Republican	Others/Uncommitted	8	1.07	

==== 2016 ====
The 2016 presidential primaries for both the Republican and Democratic parties were held in Missouri on March 15. Businessman Donald Trump (R-New York) narrowly won the state overall, but carried a majority of the vote in Carroll County. He went on to win the presidency.

Missouri Republican Presidential Primary – Carroll County (2016)
Party	Candidate	Votes	%	±%
Republican	Donald Trump	1,004	51.28	
Republican	Ted Cruz	657	33.56	
Republican	John Kasich	150	7.66	
Republican	Marco Rubio	90	4.60	
Republican	Others/Uncommitted	57	2.91	

On the Democratic side, former Secretary of State Hillary Clinton (D-New York) narrowly won statewide, but Senator Bernie Sanders (I-Vermont) carried a majority in Carroll County.

Missouri Democratic Presidential Primary – Carroll County (2016)
Party	Candidate	Votes	%	±%
Democratic	Bernie Sanders	255	50.70	
Democratic	Hillary Clinton	233	46.32	
Democratic	Others/Uncommitted	15	2.98	

==== 2012 ====
The 2012 Missouri Republican Presidential Primary's results were nonbinding on the state's national convention delegates. Voters in Carroll County supported former U.S. Senator Rick Santorum (R-Pennsylvania), who finished first in the state at large, but eventually lost the nomination to former Governor Mitt Romney (R-Massachusetts). Delegates to the congressional district and state conventions were chosen at a county caucus, which selected a delegation favoring Santorum. Incumbent President Barack Obama easily won the Missouri Democratic Primary and renomination. He defeated Romney in the general election.

==== 2008 ====
In 2008, the Missouri Republican Presidential Primary was closely contested, with Senator John McCain (R-Arizona) prevailing and eventually winning the nomination. Carroll County gave McCain his highest vote share of any county in Missouri.

Missouri Republican Presidential Primary – Carroll County (2008)
Party	Candidate	Votes	%	±%
Republican	John McCain	437	47.81	
Republican	Mike Huckabee	251	27.46	
Republican	Mitt Romney	175	19.15	
Republican	Ron Paul	28	3.06	
Republican	Others/Uncommitted	23	2.52	

Then-Senator Hillary Clinton (D-New York) received more votes than any candidate from either party in Carroll County during the 2008 presidential primary. Despite initial reports that Clinton had won Missouri, Barack Obama (D-Illinois), also a Senator at the time, narrowly defeated her statewide and later became that year's Democratic nominee, going on to win the presidency.

Missouri Democratic Presidential Primary – Carroll County (2008)
Party	Candidate	Votes	%	±%
Democratic	Hillary Clinton	548	62.84	
Democratic	Barack Obama	299	34.29	
Democratic	Others/Uncommitted	25	2.86	

== See also ==
- Mormon War (1838)
- National Register of Historic Places listings in Carroll County, Missouri
