= Fairfield Township, Carroll County, Missouri =

Township in Carroll County, Missouri, U.S.

Fairfield Township, Missouri
- Township
- Location of Fairfield Township, within Carroll County, Missouri
- Coordinates: 39.4831°N 93.7061°W
- Country: United States
- State: Missouri
- County: Carroll

Area
  - Total: 36.68 sq mi (95.0 km^{2})
  - Land: 36.67 sq mi (95.0 km^{2})
  - Water: 0.01 sq mi (0.026 km^{2})

Population (2020)
  - Total: 120
  - Density: 3.3/sq mi (1.3/km^{2})
- Time zone: UTC-6 (Central (CST))
  - Summer (DST): UTC-5 (CDT)
- GNIS feature ID: 766411

Fairfield Township is a township in Carroll County, in the U.S. state of Missouri. The population was 120 at the 2020 census.
