= Carrollton Township, Carroll County, Missouri =

Carrollton Township
- Township
- Location in Carroll County
- Coordinates: 39°22′06″N 093°29′36″W
- Country: United States
- State: Missouri
- County: Carroll

Area
  - Total: 35.59 sq mi (92.17 km^{2})
  - Land: 35.51 sq mi (91.98 km^{2})
  - Water: 0.073 sq mi (0.19 km^{2}) 0.21%
- Elevation: 738 ft (225 m)

Population (2020)
  - Total: 3,857
  - Density: 108.6/sq mi (41.93/km^{2})
- GNIS feature ID: 0766405

Carrollton Township is one of twenty townships in Carroll County, Missouri, United States. As of the 2020 census, its population was 3,857.

Carrollton Township was established in 1872, and named after the community of Carrollton.

== Geography ==
Carrollton Township covers an area of 35.59 square miles (92.2 km^{2}) and contains one incorporated settlement, Carrollton (the county seat). According to the USGS, it contains three cemeteries: Mount Zion, Saint Marys and Willis Chapel.
