= Little Compton, Missouri =

Unincorporated community in Missouri, U.S.

Coordinates: 39°34′06″N 93°17′10″W

Little Compton is an unincorporated community in Carroll County, in the U.S. state of Missouri.

== History ==
A post office called Little Compton was established in 1850, and remained in operation until 1903. With construction of the railroad, business activity shifted to other nearby places and Little Compton's population dwindled.
