= Barbara Sinatra =

American model, showgirl, socialite, and philanthropist (1926–2017)

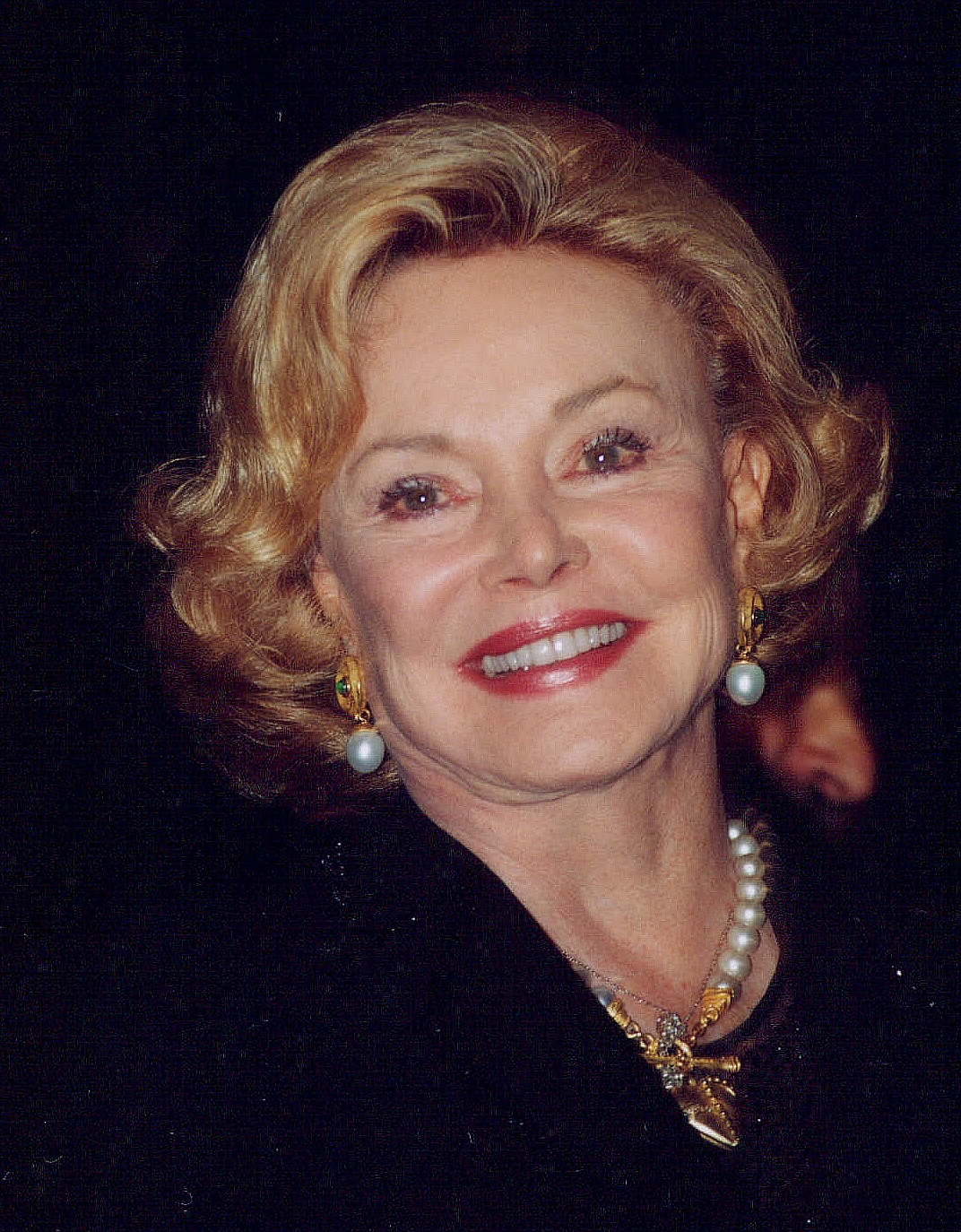
- Sinatra in 2000
- Born: Barbara Ann Blakeley; October 16, 1926; Bosworth, Missouri, U.S.
- Died: July 25, 2017 (aged 90); Rancho Mirage, California, U.S.
- Burial place: Desert Memorial Park
- Other names: Barbara Oliver; Barbara Marx
- Occupations: Showgirl; model; socialite; philanthropist
- Spouses: Robert Oliver (m. 1948; div. 1952) Zeppo Marx (m. 1959; div. 1973) Frank Sinatra (m. 1976; died 1998)
- Children: 1

Barbara Ann Sinatra (née Blakeley; October 16, 1926 – July 25, 2017) was an American model, showgirl, socialite, and philanthropist. She was married to comedian Zeppo Marx of the Marx Brothers, and later became the fourth and last wife of singer and actor Frank Sinatra.

== Early life ==
Sinatra was born as Barbara Ann Blakeley on October 16, 1926, in Bosworth, Missouri, to Irene Prunty (née Toppass) and Charles Willis Blakeley. The family moved to Wichita, Kansas when she was 10. After graduating from Wichita North High School in 1944, Sinatra moved to Long Beach, California.

== Personal life ==
She married Robert Oliver in September 1948 and had a son, Robert Blake "Bobby" Oliver on October 10, 1950. She divorced Oliver in 1952.

She married Zeppo Marx on September 18, 1959. They divorced in 1973.

She married Frank Sinatra on July 11, 1976. It was his fourth and her third marriage, and the final and the longest-lasting for both. She converted to Catholicism. According to her book, Lady Blue Eyes: My Life With Frank, "He [Frank] never asked me to change faith for him, but I could tell he was pleased that I'd consider it."

Upon his death in 1998, Frank Sinatra left her $3.5 million in assets, along with mansions in Beverly Hills, Malibu, and Palm Springs. She also inherited the rights to Sinatra's Trilogy recordings, most of his material possessions and control over his name and likeness.

== Death ==
Barbara Marx Sinatra died on July 25, 2017, in Rancho Mirage, California, of natural causes at the age of 90. She died a year before Frank's first wife, Nancy Barbato, who died on July 13, 2018, at the age of 101. She is buried at the Desert Memorial Park next to her husband Frank.

== Legacy ==
The Sinatras founded the Barbara Sinatra Children's Center in Rancho Mirage in 1986, which is close to the Betty Ford Center on the campus of the Eisenhower Medical Center. The nonprofit facility provides individual and group therapy for young victims of physical, sexual, and emotional abuse. In 1998, a Golden Palm Star on the Palm Springs Walk of Stars was dedicated to her.
