= Leslie Township, Carroll County, Missouri =

Township in Carroll County, Missouri, U.S.

Leslie Township, Missouri
- Township
- Location of Leslie Township, within Carroll County, Missouri
- Coordinates: 39.4817°N 93.5839°W
- Country: United States
- State: Missouri
- County: Carroll

Area
  - Total: 36.09 sq mi (93.5 km^{2})
  - Land: 36.03 sq mi (93.3 km^{2})
  - Water: 0.07 sq mi (0.18 km^{2})

Population (2020)
  - Total: 137
  - Density: 3.80/sq mi (1.47/km^{2})
- Time zone: UTC-6 (Central (CST))
  - Summer (DST): UTC-5 (CDT)
- GNIS feature ID: 766414

Leslie Township is a township in Carroll County, in the U.S. state of Missouri. The population was 137 at the 2020 census.

Leslie Township has the name of Colonel Leslie Combs.
