= Bridge Creek, Missouri =

Unincorporated community in Missouri, U.S.

Coordinates: 39°34′20″N 93°23′05″W

Bridge Creek is an unincorporated community in northeast Carroll County, in the U.S. state of Missouri.

The community is on Missouri Route YY above the east bank of Bridge Creek. The Chicago, Burlington and Quincy Railroad passes the community along the stream valley.

== History ==
A post office called Bridge Creek was established in 1870, and remained in operation until 1884. The community takes its name from nearby Bridge Creek, a stream which owes its name to a railroad bridge crossing it.
