= Cherry Valley Township, Carroll County, Missouri =

Township in Carroll County, Missouri, U.S.

Cherry Valley Township, Missouri
- Township
- Location of Cherry Valley Township, within Carroll County, Missouri
- Coordinates: 39.2381°N 93.7064°W
- Country: United States
- State: Missouri
- County: Carroll
- Time zone: UTC-6 (Central (CST))
  - Summer (DST): UTC-5 (CDT)
- GNIS feature ID: 766406

Cherry Valley Township is a township in Carroll County, in the U.S. state of Missouri.

Cherry Valley Township was named for the cherry trees within its borders.
