= Robert Simpson (hurdler) =

American track and field athlete and coach (1892–1974)

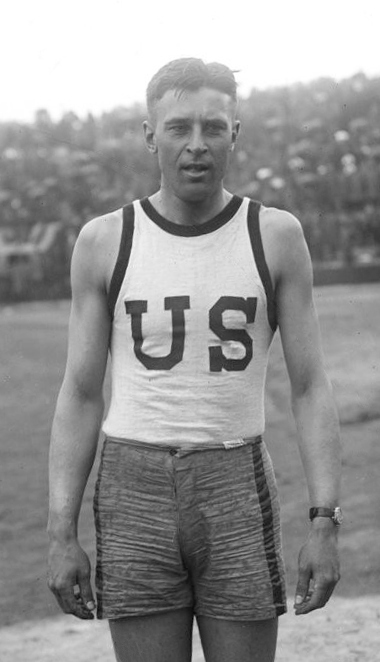
- Simpson in 1919

Personal information
- Born: May 25, 1892 Bosworth, Missouri, U.S.
- Died: November 10, 1974 (aged 82) Los Angeles, California, U.S.

Sport
- Sport: Track and field
- College team: Missouri Tigers; Iowa State Cyclones (coach)
- Club: Illinois Athletic Club

Achievements and titles
- Personal bests: 100 yd dash: 10.0; 220 yd dash: 22.0; High jump: 5 ft 9 1/2 in (1.76 m); Long jump: 23 ft 6 3/4 in (7.18 m); 120 yd hurdles: 14.6; 220 yd hurdles: 23.6
Medal record
Inter-Allied Games
Gold medal – first place	1919 Paris	110 m hurdles
Gold medal – first place	1919 Paris	200 m hurdles

Robert Ingalls Simpson (May 25, 1892 – November 10, 1974) was an American hurdler and track and field coach. Simpson set several world records in the 120 yd hurdles, equaled the world record in the 220 yd hurdles, and won two gold medals at the 1919 Inter-Allied Games. He served in the United States Army in both World Wars, rising to the rank of major by 1944. He was track and field head coach at first the University of Missouri and then Iowa State University, and later in Hungary; he also coached Army athletes.

== Athletic career ==
=== Early life ===
Simpson grew up on his family's farm in Bosworth, Missouri. He was the oldest of three brothers and part of a track and field family; his younger brothers John Simpson and Chauncey Simpson followed him in the sport, as did his cousin, William Sylvester. Simpson first became an athlete at Bosworth High School, but did not yet take up hurdling; instead, he excelled in the long jump and high jump and also competed in the sprints, becoming known as the "one-man track team". In addition, he played baseball and basketball.

After graduating from high school in 1913 Simpson entered the University of Missouri, where he was coached by Henry F. Schulte. Schulte introduced Simpson to hurdling in his freshman year, and the 120 yd (109.7 m) high hurdles and the 220 yd (201.2 m) low hurdles soon became his main events, though he continued to also compete as a sprinter and long jumper. Rather than relying on his sprinter's speed, Simpson became known for the efficient hurdling technique that he developed with Schulte, based on keeping his arms lined up with the track while jumping over a hurdle, as opposed to the sideways arm action of other hurdlers of the time. While he attempted to minimize the margins by which he cleared the hurdles, he very rarely knocked any hurdles over, and at the time, only runs with no hurdles toppled could be officially ratified as records.

=== 1915 ===
Simpson's first major race in the 120 yd hurdles was at the April 1915 Penn Relays. Still little-known outside his native Missouri, Simpson faced a strong field that included Fred W. Kelly, the 1912 Olympic champion and world record holder at 15.0. Kelly won, but only defeated Simpson by inches. At the Missouri Valley Conference meet at the end of May Simpson won the high hurdles in 15.0, equaling Kelly's record; he also won the low hurdles and the long jump. The following week he won a hurdles double at the Western Conference meet, again running 15.0 in the high hurdles and a meeting record 24.6 in the low hurdles. At the 1915 national championships Simpson placed fourth in the low hurdles and crossed the finish line in third place in the high hurdles, behind Kelly and Feg Murray. However, Kelly was disqualified for knocking down four hurdles (three was the limit), making Simpson the runner-up.

=== 1916 ===
Simpson reached his peak in 1916. He won the high hurdles at the 1916 Penn Relays, again equaling Kelly's world record of 15.0, even though no records had been expected due to the slow grass track. (Note: This was the first time anyone had run the imperial 120 yd hurdles in 15.0 on grass. However, Forrest Smithson had won the slightly longer 110 m hurdles in 15.0 at the 1908 Summer Olympics, where a grass track was also used.) He then broke the record in a dual meet against Iowa State on May 6, running 14.8; he also won the low hurdles, the 100 yd dash and the long jump. The following week Simpson equaled his new record in another dual meet; this time, he won four additional events, with his long jump mark of 23 ft 6 3/4 in (7.18 m) being a new Missouri Valley record. His hurdles rivals were also in strong form, however; Kelly and Murray both ran 15.0 that spring, and on May 13 Earl Thomson, a Canadian-American, defeated them both in a Stanford race and tied Simpson's fresh record of 14.8.

Simpson regained sole hold of the world record two weeks later at the 1916 Missouri Valley Conference championships, which Missouri hosted. He won the high hurdles in 14.6, improving his own world record by another fifth of a second, and equaled Alvin Kraenzlein's world record of 23.6 in the low hurdles; in addition, he won the long jump. There were originally some doubts about whether this new record was valid, as although the required number of clocks timed him in 14.6 or faster, one clock caught him in 15.0; however, the following week Simpson won another hurdles double at the Western Conference meeting, again running 14.6 and removing all doubts. These times would remain his best.

The 1916 national championships were held in Newark in September, with Simpson returning from several months of no competition. He faced Thomson, Kelly (who had also run 14.8) and Murray, and won in 14.8, a meeting record. This race was called the "greatest hurdle race in history" both before and after the meet, although the New York Times wrote that it "did not produce the sensation everybody expected" due to Simpson winning too comfortably; he was never behind and defeated Kelly by about two yards. In the fall Simpson toured Scandinavia with four other American athletes, including Murray; in Stockholm, he won the 110 m hurdles in 14.8, (Note: Timed with 1/10-second accuracy, and accordingly cited as 14 8/10 (rather than 14 4/5, like his other 14.8 races) when fractions and not decimals were given. 110 meters is 27.2 cm (about 10.7 in) longer than 120 yards; in other respects, the metric and imperial hurdles races were identical.) which was a world record for the metric high hurdles, although the International Amateur Athletic Federation never ratified it as one.

By the end of the year Simpson had run under Kelly's old world record of 15.0 seven times, with record applications made for five of those times. Sporting Life's Daniel Ferris named Simpson and Ted Meredith, who had broken the world records for both 440 yards and 880 yards, the leading American track and field athletes of 1916, while Lou Handley singled Simpson out in his Pittsburg Press recap of the year.

=== 1917 ===
Simpson was named captain of the Missouri Tigers track and field team for 1917. He led the Tigers to another Missouri Valley Conference title, winning the long jump and both hurdles races. He also won all three events at the Western Conference meet; his winning time in the 220 yd low hurdles was 24.2, a world best for that distance around a curve. (Note: Simpson's earlier 23.6 had been run on a straight track; for a long time, it was common in the United States to run both the flat 220 yards and the 220 yd low hurdles entirely on straights.)

Simpson graduated from Missouri after the 1917 season, having also been successful academically; he was the inaugural recipient of a special award for the Missouri letterman with the best scholarship marks. He missed the 1917 national championships, but was still named as the top high hurdler to both the All-American athletic team and the All-American collegiate team of the year.

=== Later career ===
After the 1917 season Simpson joined the United States Army and attended the officers' training camp at Fort Sheridan; he became a lieutenant and track and field instructor for the 91st Division. He resumed hurdling after World War I was over, winning both the high hurdles and the low hurdles at the 1919 Inter-Allied Games in Paris; in the low hurdles he had lost to his own cousin, William Sylvester, in the American tryouts for the meet, but defeated him at the Games themselves. On September 7, 1919, Simpson won the 120 yd hurdles at the Knights of Columbus Olympics, an Armed Forces meeting held at Camp Dix, defeating former national champion Harold Barron; Simpson's time of 15.0 was the fastest in the world that year. A week later he won his second national championship title in the high hurdles, running 15.2 and beating Kelly and Barron; he also won the low hurdles in 24.4, his only national title in that event.

== Coaching career ==
Simpson became the University of Missouri's head track coach after the 1919 season; the move ended his career as an athlete in his own right, as track and field was in the era of amateurism and university coaches were considered professionals. He stayed at Missouri until 1926, his star pupils being Olympic champion Jackson Scholz and Olympic silver medalist Brutus Hamilton; he had worked with and guided Scholz even before officially becoming a coach. He also coached his own younger brother Chauncey, who later became a track, football and golf coach at Missouri. Simpson's Tigers won the Missouri Valley Conference team championship twice, in 1920 and 1925.

After the 1926 season Simpson moved to Iowa State University, coaching the track team there until 1937; his students there included NCAA mile champions Ray Conger and Ray Putnam. In 1939 Simpson became a coach and athletic director in Hungary, where he stayed for the next years despite World War II.

== Later life ==
Simpson re-enlisted in the U.S. Army in 1942 with the rank of captain, gaining promotion to major in 1944. After the war he served as the Army's track and field director in Europe; he was recalled up to the United States in 1948 to coach Army and Air Force Olympic hopefuls at the Lackland Air Force Base in San Antonio. Simpson remained active in track and field as a meeting official after leaving the Army in 1950. He died in Los Angeles, California on November 10, 1974.

== Personal life ==
Simpson married Meryl Leavell, women's tennis champion at the University of Missouri, in May 1918 after a short engagement. They had a daughter named Phyllis and a son named Robert.

== Legacy ==
Simpson is a charter member of both the National Track and Field Hall of Fame and the University of Missouri Intercollegiate Athletics Hall of Fame. He was inducted into the Missouri Sports Hall of Fame in 1963.

== Notes ==
Records
Preceded by Fred Kelly	Men's 120 yd Hurdles World Record Holder; May 29, 1915 – May 29, 1920	Succeeded by Earl Thomson
