= Stokes Mound Township, Carroll County, Missouri =

Township in Carroll County, Missouri, U.S.

Stokes Mound Township, Missouri
- Township
- Location of Stokes Mound Township, within Carroll County, Missouri
- Coordinates: 39°34′18″N 93°28′40″W
- Country: United States
- State: Missouri
- County: Carroll

Area
  - Total: 35.18 sq mi (91.1 km^{2})
  - Land: 35.16 sq mi (91.1 km^{2})
  - Water: 0.03 sq mi (0.078 km^{2})

Population (2020)
  - Total: 317
  - Density: 9.02/sq mi (3.48/km^{2})
- Time zone: UTC-6 (Central (CST))
  - Summer (DST): UTC-5 (CDT)
- GNIS feature ID: 766420

Stokes Mound Township is a township in Carroll County, in the U.S. state of Missouri. Stock Mound Township has a population of 317 according to the 2020 census.

Stokes Mound Township is named after an Indian mound of the same name.
