= James Fergason =

- Born: James Lee Fergason; January 12, 1934; Wakenda, Missouri, U.S.
- Died: December 9, 2008 (aged 74)
- Occupations: Inventor, businessman
- Spouse: Dora (1956-2008; his death)
- Children: Teresa, Jeffery, John, Susan
- Awards: IEEE Jun-ichi Nishizawa Medal

James Lee Fergason (January 12, 1934 – December 9, 2008) was an American inventor and business entrepreneur. A member of the National Inventors Hall of Fame, Fergason is best known for his work on an improved liquid crystal display, or LCD. He held over one hundred U.S. patents at the time of his death.

== Early life and education ==
James Lee "Jim" Fergason was born on a farm near the small town of Wakenda, Carroll County, Missouri.

He was educated in a one-room schoolhouse until the 7th grade when his family moved to the county seat of Carrollton. The Fergason family had something of a reputation for educational over achievement. One grandfather graduated from college at age fifteen, while two of Fergason's older brothers studied chemical engineering and electrical engineering respectively. A cousin was an agricultural engineer who had over 100 patents for his machinery inventions.

Following his graduation from Carrollton High School in 1952 he enrolled at the University of Missouri, earning a Bachelor's Degree in physics in 1956. Fergason married his wife Dora the week after graduation from Mizzou, then reported for a brief tour of duty as a second lieutenant with the United States Army in Texas.

== Professional career ==
After his discharge from the Army, Fergason was hired by Westinghouse Research Laboratories in Pennsylvania. At Westinghouse he began groundbreaking work with cholesteric liquid crystals, forming the first industrial research group into the practical uses of the technology. For this work Fergason earned his first patent (U.S. patent 3,114,836) in 1963. Among the later uses for his research and first patent were the 1970s pop culture icon the mood ring, and the Liquid crystal thermometer.

In June 1966, Fergason joined the Liquid Crystal Institute at Kent State University as its associate director. Here, in 1969, he made his seminal discovery of a low-power, field-operated liquid crystal display, known as the twisted nematic cell, and received a patent.(U.S. patent 3,731,986) There was a controversy about this invention. The inventors Martin Schadt and Wolfgang Helfrich of Hoffmann-La Roche had filed a Swiss patent application for the same invention at an earlier international priority date than Fergason in 1970. However, a US patent was granted to Fergason due to a predated US patent notebook entry in 1970. All three were awarded the IEEE Jun-ichi Nishizawa Medal in 2008 for this invention. Also at LCI, Fergason was part of an effort to use cholesteric liquid crystals for thermal mapping, in particular, to screen for breast cancer. He participated in the discovery of smectic C liquid crystal phase.

Twisted nematic liquid crystal displays were superior to the earlier dynamic scattering displays, and soon became widespread. The technology was patented in the United States by Fergason in 1971. He formed his own company, ILIXCO, in 1968 to manufacture liquid crystal displays. His first customers were the Bulova Watch Company and Gruen Watch Company which used the technology to market the first LCD watches using this technology. By the end of the decade, most of the world's digital watches used this kind of LCD. Fergason held over 150 patents in the United States and over 500 foreign patents. He also was inducted into the National Inventors Hall of Fame. In 2001, he founded Fergason Patent Properties, which managed licensing of his patents.

In 2001, he was awarded an honorary doctorate from the University of Missouri, in 2006 he was the recipient of the Lemelson-MIT Prize, in 2007 he was awarded the David Richardson Medal by the Optical Society of America, and in 2008 he received the Jun-Ichi Nishizawa Medal from the Institute of Electrical and Electronics Engineers. He was also elected a Fellow of the Optical Society in 2008.

== Death ==
Fergason died at age 74 in Menlo Park. He was survived by his wife Dora and their four children, Teresa, Jeffrey, John and Susan, and his 11 grandchildren.

== Sources ==
- Liquid Crystal Display - James Fergason (About.com Inventors)
- James Fergason: Liquid Crystal Display (LCD) (Lemelson-MIT Program)
- James Fergason (Lemelson-MIT Prize)
