= Bosworth, Missouri =

- City
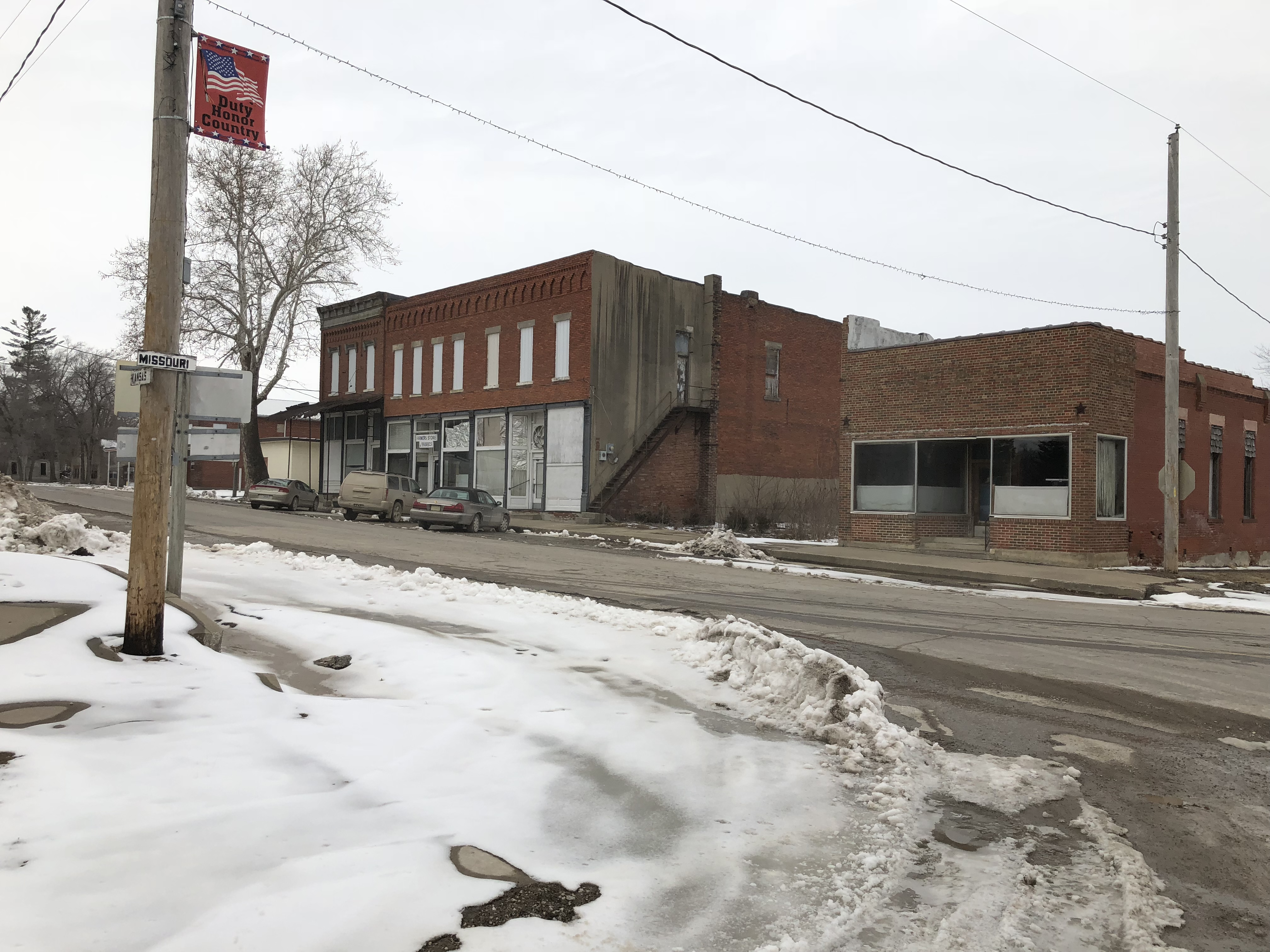
- Downtown in winter 2019

- Location of Bosworth, Missouri
- Coordinates: 39°28′12″N 93°20′08″W
- Country: United States
- State: Missouri
- County: Carroll
- Incorporated: 1895

Area
  - Total: 0.55 sq mi (1.43 km^{2})
  - Land: 0.55 sq mi (1.43 km^{2})
  - Water: 0 sq mi (0.00 km^{2})
- Elevation: 764 ft (233 m)

Population (2020)
  - Total: 213
  - Density: 384.7/sq mi (148.54/km^{2})
- Time zone: UTC-6 (Central (CST))
  - Summer (DST): UTC-5 (CDT)
- ZIP code: 64623
- Area code: 660
- FIPS code: 29-07426
- GNIS feature ID: 2394224

Bosworth is a city in Carroll County, Missouri, United States. The population was 213 at the 2020 U.S. census.

== History ==
Bosworth was laid out in 1888, and named for a settler. A post office called Bosworth has been in operation since 1888.

== Geography ==
According to the United States Census Bureau, the city has a total area of 0.55 square miles (1.42 km^{2}), all land.

== Demographics ==
Historical population
Census	Pop.	Note	%±
1900	401		—
1910	767		91.3%
1920	672		−12.4%
1930	612		−8.9%
1940	505		−17.5%
1950	503		−0.4%
1960	465		−7.6%
1970	386		−17.0%
1980	394		2.1%
1990	334		−15.2%
2000	382		14.4%
2010	305		−20.2%
2020	213		−30.2%
U.S. Decennial Census

=== 2010 census ===
As of the U.S. Census of 2010, there were 305 people, 122 households, and 71 families living in the city. The population density was 554.5 inhabitants per square mile (214.1/km^{2}). There were 158 housing units at an average density of 287.3 per square mile (110.9/km^{2}). The racial makeup of the city was 98.7% white, 0.3% from other races, and 1.0% from two or more races. Hispanic or Latino of any race were 3.0% of the population.

There were 122 households, of which 36.1% had children under the age of 18 living with them, 41.0% were married couples living together, 13.9% had a female householder with no husband present, 3.3% had a male householder with no wife present, and 41.8% were non-families. 33.6% of all households were made up of individuals, and 16.4% had someone living alone who was 65 years of age or older. The average household size was 2.50 and the average family size was 3.25.

The median age in the city was 36.4 years. 27.2% of residents were under the age of 18; 7.9% were between the ages of 18 and 24; 24.2% were from 25 to 44; 26.5% were from 45 to 64; and 14.1% were 65 years of age or older. The gender makeup of the city was 48.9% male and 51.1% female.

=== 2000 census ===
As of the U.S. Census of 2000, there were 382 people, 153 households, and 102 families living in the city. The population density was 691.0 inhabitants per square mile (266.8/km^{2}). There were 195 housing units at an average density of 352.7 per square mile (136.2/km^{2}). The racial makeup of the city was 100.00% white.

There were 153 households, out of which 30.7% had children under the age of 18 living with them, 56.9% were married couples living together, 6.5% had a female householder with no husband present, and 32.7% were non-families. 26.8% of all households were made up of individuals, and 16.3% had someone living alone who was 65 years of age or older. The average household size was 2.50 and the average family size was 3.09.

In the city, the population was spread out, with 29.1% under the age of 18, 6.8% from 18 to 24, 24.6% from 25 to 44, 20.2% from 45 to 64, and 19.4% who were 65 years of age or older. The median age was 37 years. For every 100 females, there were 101.1 males. For every 100 females age 18 and over, there were 97.8 males.

The median income for a household in the city was $25,357, and the median income for a family was $28,750. Males had a median income of $23,250 versus $17,292 for females. The per capita income for the city was $11,526. About 11.7% of families and 15.4% of the population were below the poverty line, including 23.5% of those under age 18 and 6.3% of those age 65 or over.

== Notable people ==
- Lewis Eldon Atherton, historian at the University of Missouri
- Barbara Ann Blakeley, model, showgirl, socialite, wife of Frank Sinatra
- Robert Simpson, athlete, was born in Bosworth.
