= Norborne, Missouri =

City in Carroll County, Missouri, United States

- City
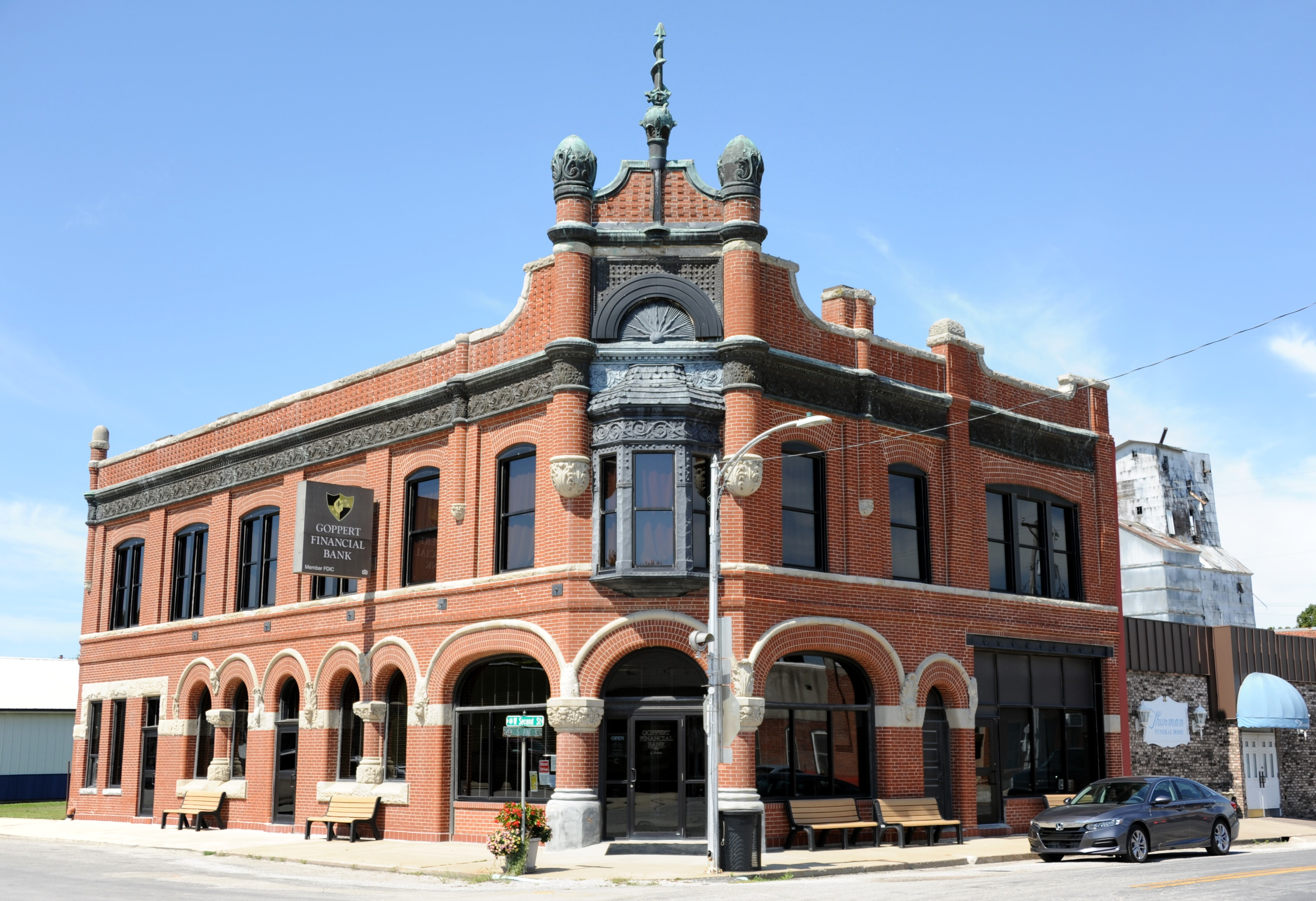
- The Farmers Bank Building, September 2019

- Location of Norborne, Missouri
- Coordinates: 39°18′09″N 93°40′33″W
- Country: United States
- State: Missouri
- County: Carroll
- Incorporated: 1874

Government
  - Mayor: Chris Leabo

Area
  - Total: 0.65 sq mi (1.68 km^{2})
  - Land: 0.65 sq mi (1.68 km^{2})
  - Water: 0 sq mi (0.00 km^{2})
- Elevation: 689 ft (210 m)

Population (2020)
  - Total: 634
  - Density: 979.3/sq mi (378.11/km^{2})
- Time zone: UTC-6 (Central (CST))
  - Summer (DST): UTC-5 (CDT)
- ZIP code: 64668
- Area code: 660
- FIPS code: 29-52760
- GNIS feature ID: 2395245
- Website: https://cityofnorborne.org

Norborne is a city in southwest Carroll County, Missouri, United States. The population was 634 at the 2020 census.

Norborne was founded in 1868 by Norborne B. Coates, a civil engineer for the railroad. The town has numerous small businesses but is mostly an agricultural community. Norborne is the self-proclaimed Soybean Capital of the World and holds a Soybean Festival every year during the weekend of the second Saturday in August.

== History ==
Norborne was laid out in 1868. The community was named after one of its founders, Norborne B. Coates. A post office called Norborne has been in operation since 1869.

The Farmers Bank Building was listed on the National Register of Historic Places in 1994.

== Geography ==
Norborne is located on Missouri Route 10 approximately ten miles west-southwest of Carrollton and 15 miles east of Richmond in adjacent Ray County. The Missouri River is five miles to the south.

The Atchison Topeka and Santa Fe and the Wabash railroads both pass through the community.

According to the United States Census Bureau, the city has a total area of 0.65 square miles (1.68 km^{2}), all land.

== Demographics ==
Historical population
Census	Pop.	Note	%±
1870	148		—
1880	602		306.8%
1890	1,005		66.9%
1900	1,189		18.3%
1910	1,241		4.4%
1920	1,180		−4.9%
1930	1,190		0.8%
1940	1,239		4.1%
1950	1,114		−10.1%
1960	965		−13.4%
1970	950		−1.6%
1980	931		−2.0%
1990	856		−8.1%
2000	805		−6.0%
2010	708		−12.0%
2020	634		−10.5%
U.S. Decennial Census

=== 2010 census ===
As of the census of 2010, there were 708 people, 306 households, and 185 families residing in the city. The population density was 1,089.2 inhabitants per square mile (420.5/km^{2}). There were 367 housing units at an average density of 564.6 per square mile (218.0/km^{2}). The racial makeup of the city was 95.3% White, 2.1% African American, 0.7% Native American, 0.1% from other races, and 1.7% from two or more races. Hispanic or Latino of any race were 1.3% of the population.

There were 306 households, of which 29.4% had children under the age of 18 living with them, 41.8% were married couples living together, 9.8% had a female householder with no husband present, 8.8% had a male householder with no wife present, and 39.5% were non-families. 34.6% of all households were made up of individuals, and 19.6% had someone living alone who was 65 years of age or older. The average household size was 2.31 and the average family size was 2.97.

The median age in the city was 40.5 years. 23% of residents were under the age of 18; 8.8% were between the ages of 18 and 24; 23.5% were from 25 to 44; 27.5% were from 45 to 64; and 17.2% were 65 years of age or older. The gender makeup of the city was 47.2% male and 52.8% female.

=== 2000 census ===
As of the census of 2000, there were 805 people, 358 households, and 220 families residing in the city. The population density was 1,285.0 inhabitants per square mile (496.1/km^{2}). There were 404 housing units at an average density of 644.9 per square mile (249.0/km^{2}). The racial makeup of the city was 95.16% White, 3.60% African American and 1.24% Native American. Hispanic or Latino of any race were 0.99% of the population.

There were 358 households, out of which 28.2% had children under the age of 18 living with them, 50.0% were married couples living together, 6.4% had a female householder with no husband present, and 38.3% were non-families. 34.6% of all households were made up of individuals, and 20.4% had someone living alone who was 65 years of age or older. The average household size was 2.25 and the average family size was 2.93.

In the city the population was spread out, with 25.0% under the age of 18, 7.7% from 18 to 24, 24.2% from 25 to 44, 22.4% from 45 to 64, and 20.7% who were 65 years of age or older. The median age was 40 years. For every 100 females, there were 90.3 males. For every 100 females age 18 and over, there were 81.9 males.

The median income for a household in the city was $25,208, and the median income for a family was $31,488. Males had a median income of $24,821 versus $18,393 for females. The per capita income for the city was $14,526. About 11.1% of families and 15.8% of the population were below the poverty line, including 21.1% of those under age 18 and 15.2% of those age 65 or over.

== Education ==
Public education in Norborne is administered by the Norborne R-VIII School District.

Norborne has a lending library, the Norborne Public Library.

== Notable people ==
- Bob Walkenhorst - Musician, lead of the Kansas City-based rock band The Rainmakers (band)

== See also ==
- List of municipalities in Missouri
