= Fairville, Missouri =

Unincorporated community in the US state of Missouri

Coordinates: 39°13′55″N 93°13′06″W

Fairville is an unincorporated community in Saline County, in the U.S. state of Missouri.

== History ==
Fairville was platted in 1856, and so named on account of the "fair" setting of the original town site. A post office called Fairville was established in 1869, and remained in operation until 1903.
