= Miami Station, Missouri =

- Unincorporated community
- Location within Missouri
- Coordinates: 39°20′41″N 93°15′50″W
- Country: United States
- State: Missouri
- County: Carroll
- Elevation: 646 ft (197 m)
- Time zone: UTC-6 (Central (CST))
  - Summer (DST): UTC-5 (CDT)
- Area code: 660
- GNIS feature ID: 722264

Miami Station is an unincorporated community in Carroll County, Missouri, United States. Miami Station is located along Missouri Supplemental Route V, 2.5 miles (4.0 km) northwest of Miami.

== History ==
Miami Station was laid out in 1870 as a station on the St. Louis, Kansas City and Northern Railway; it served as the main freight station for Miami. A post office called Miami Station was established in 1869, and remained in operation until 1951. U.S. Senator William A. Blakley was born in Miami Station.
