= Wakenda, Missouri =

Unincorporated community in Missouri, U.S.

- Unincorporated community
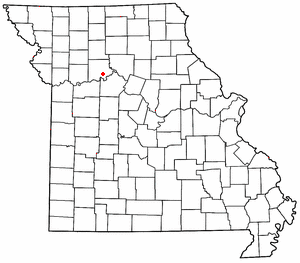
- Coordinates: 39°18′51″N 93°22′38″W
- Country: United States
- State: Missouri
- County: Carroll

Area
  - Total: 32.5 sq mi (84.1 km^{2})
  - Land: 31.7 sq mi (82.0 km^{2})
  - Water: 0.81 sq mi (2.1 km^{2})
- Elevation: 653 ft (199 m)

Population (2000)
  - Total: 467
  - Density: 15/sq mi (5.7/km^{2})
- Time zone: UTC-6 (Central (CST))
  - Summer (DST): UTC-5 (CDT)
- ZIP code: 64687
- Area code: 660
- FIPS code: 29-76552
- GNIS feature ID: 0766424

Wakenda (/ˈwɔːkəndɔː/ WAW-kən-daw) is an unincorporated community in Carroll County, in the U.S. state of Missouri.

== History ==
Wakenda was platted in 1869, and took its name from Wakenda Township. A post office called Wakenda was established in 1876, and remained in operation until 1995.

== Notable person ==
James Fergason, an inventor, was born in Wakenda.
