= Stet, Missouri =

Unincorporated community in Missouri

Coordinates: 39°25′23″N 93°45′32″W

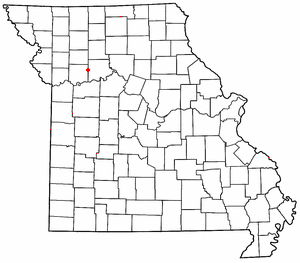

Stet is an unincorporated community on the Ray/Carroll County line and part of the Kansas City metropolitan area. It is located approximately fourteen miles northwest of Carrollton at the intersection of Missouri Supplemental Routes K and JJ.

== History ==
A post office called Stet was established in 1890, and remained in operation until 1973. That same year, the rural route was consolidated with Norborne but the building stayed open as a contract office until 2011. The origin of the name "Stet" is obscure. The meaning of Stet in Latin is "let it stand."
