= De Witt, Missouri =

- City
- Location of De Witt, Missouri
- Coordinates: 39°23′06″N 93°13′12″W
- Country: United States
- State: Missouri
- County: Carroll
- Incorporated: 1910

Area
  - Total: 0.24 sq mi (0.62 km^{2})
  - Land: 0.24 sq mi (0.62 km^{2})
  - Water: 0 sq mi (0.00 km^{2})
- Elevation: 745 ft (227 m)

Population (2020)
  - Total: 83
  - Density: 344.2/sq mi (132.89/km^{2})
- Time zone: UTC-6 (Central (CST))
  - Summer (DST): UTC-5 (CDT)
- ZIP code: 64639
- Area code: 660
- FIPS code: 29-19378
- GNIS feature ID: 2394477

De Witt is a city in Carroll County, Missouri, United States. The population was 83 at the 2020 census.

== History ==
A post office called De Witt has been in operation since 1842. The community was named for DeWitt Clinton, governor of New York.

== Geography ==
According to the United States Census Bureau, the city has a total area of 0.24 square miles (0.62 km^{2}), all land.

== Demographics ==
Historical population
Census	Pop.	Note	%±
1860	203		—
1870	317		56.2%
1880	530		67.2%
1890	633		19.4%
1900	550		−13.1%
1910	423		−23.1%
1920	360		−14.9%
1930	371		3.1%
1940	314		−15.4%
1950	254		−19.1%
1960	174		−31.5%
1970	135		−22.4%
1980	132		−2.2%
1990	125		−5.3%
2000	120		−4.0%
2010	124		3.3%
2020	83		−33.1%
U.S. Decennial Census

=== 2010 census ===
At the 2010 census, of 2010, there were 124 people, 49 households and 33 families living in the city. The population density was 516.7 inhabitants per square mile (199.5/km^{2}). There were 56 housing units at an average density of 233.3 per square mile (90.1/km^{2}). The racial makeup of the city was 90.3% White, 5.6% African American, and 4.0% from two or more races. Hispanic or Latino of any race were 0.8% of the population.

There were 49 households, of which 32.7% had children under the age of 18 living with them, 59.2% were married couples living together, 4.1% had a female householder with no husband present, 4.1% had a male householder with no wife present, and 32.7% were non-families. 22.4% of all households were made up of individuals, and 6.1% had someone living alone who was 65 years of age or older. The average household size was 2.53 and the average family size was 2.97.

The median age was 43.7 years. 25.8% of residents were under the age of 18; 4.9% were between the ages of 18 and 24; 20.1% were from 25 to 44; 29.1% were from 45 to 64; and 20.2% were 65 years of age or older. The gender makeup of the city was 48.4% male and 51.6% female.

=== 2000 census ===
At the 2000 census, of 2000, there were 120 people, 42 households and 33 families living in the city. The population density was 486.5 inhabitants per square mile (187.8/km^{2}). There were 55 housing units at an average density of 223.0 per square mile (86.1/km^{2}). The racial makeup of the city was 91.67% White, 5.83% African American, 0.83% Native American, 0.83% Pacific Islander, and 0.83% from two or more races.

There were 42 households, of which 42.9% had children under the age of 18 living with them, 66.7% were married couples living together, 7.1% had a female householder with no husband present, and 21.4% were non-families. 14.3% of all households were made up of individuals, and 4.8% had someone living alone who was 65 years of age or older. The average household size was 2.86 and the average family size was 3.27.

28.3% of the population were under the age of 18, 11.7% from 18 to 24, 26.7% from 25 to 44, 24.2% from 45 to 64, and 9.2% who were 65 years of age or older. The median age was 32 years. For every 100 females, there were 96.7 males. For every 100 females age 18 and over, there were 115.0 males.

The median household income was $28,500 and the median family income was $29,167. Males had a median income of $19,375 compared with $25,833 for females. The per capita income for the city was $15,030. There were no families and 6.9% of the population living below the poverty line, including no under eighteens and none of those over 64.

== See also ==
- Mormon War (1838): Mormons expelled from De Witt
