= Bob Walkenhorst =

American singer-songwriter

- Origin: Norborne, Missouri, United States
- Genre: Roots rock
- Occupations: Singer, songwriter, musician, painter
- Member of: The Rainmakers
- Website: www.bobwalkenhorst.com

Bob Walkenhorst is an American singer, songwriter, musician, and painter, based in Kansas City. After growing up in his hometown of Norborne, Missouri, he became a founding member of the popular Midwestern U.S. roots rock band The Rainmakers. In the Kansas City area, he currently gives weekly performances and participates in art gallery shows. For some shows, he is joined by his daughter Una.

As the singer/songwriter of his band, The Rainmakers, from 1986 to 1996, Walkenhorst's discography included five full-length studio albums, one live concert recording, and one "best-of" album. After the dissolution of the band, he released his first solo album, The Beginner, in 2003. In 2009, Walkenhorst and fellow Kansas City musician Jeff Porter released an album entitled No Abandon, under the moniker Walkenhorst and Porter. The Rainmakers reformed in 2011 and have since released three more albums.

Throughout his career as a musician, Walkenhorst has maintained a reputation for producing clever and provocative lyrics, which have garnered him wide critical acclaim. In discussing the self-titled debut of The Rainmakers, Billboard called them "a band with a rarity: a genuinely witty songwriter." A 1987 review in the Washington Post cited the cleverness while also noting irreverent humor. On a very different note, a review from later that year in the Chicago Tribune observed, "Walkenhorst's lyrics are preoccupied with morality, although he avoids a moralizing tone." Over three decades later, in 2018, the Richmond (Missouri) News said, "His unique vocals and viewpoints have garnered him a dedicated following, through more than 30 years in the music scene."

Perhaps the best-known fan of The Rainmakers and Walkenhorst was Stephen King, who included lyrics from the songs "Downstream" and "Drinkin' on the Job" in The Tommyknockers. In Gerald's Game, King excerpted "One More Summer"—citing Walkenhorst by name—and adopted Walkenhorst's character "The Lakeview Man" in service of the story.
