= The Rainmakers (band) =

American rock band based in Missouri

- Origin: Kansas City, Missouri
- Genres: Rock
- Years active: 1983–1990, 1994–1998, 2011–present
- Labels: Polygram, Mercury, Bat Records (since 1994, independent)
- Members: Bob Walkenhorst; Rich Ruth; Pat Tomek; Jeff Porter
- Past members: Steve Phillips; Michael Bliss

The Rainmakers are a Kansas City, Missouri-based original rock band, fronted by Bob Walkenhorst, which had a small string of hits in the late 1980s and early 1990s in the United States and Europe, especially Norway.

== Biography ==
The Rainmakers were formed in 1983 as a three-piece bar band called Steve, Bob and Rich. They released one album, Balls, under this name. The addition of drummer Pat Tomek allowed Walkenhorst to switch to guitar and assume the role of frontman. The band changed their name to The Rainmakers when they were signed to PolyGram by A&R man Peter Lubin.

The band's self-titled 1986 debut album received good reviews in the U.S. entertainment media (Newsweek magazine dubbed it "the most auspicious debut album of the year") and reached No. 87 on the U.S. Billboard album chart. The band made a fan of horror author Stephen King, who quoted the band's lyrics in his novels The Tommyknockers and Gerald's Game. The album, however, achieved its greatest commercial success overseas. In the United Kingdom, the single "Let My People Go–Go" (a song based on the American Negro spiritual anthem "Go Down Moses") broke into the Top 20 in the UK Singles Chart.

Their follow-up album, 1987's Tornado, peaked at #116 on the U.S. chart. The Rainmakers released one more studio album, 1989's The Good News and The Bad News, and one live album, 1990's Oslo-Wichita Live, which were successful in Europe, but did not chart in the U.S.. The band broke up after the release of the live album, which was only issued in Europe.

Scandinavian interest in their music remained high, and they reformed and released a new album, Flirting with the Universe, in 1994. The album achieved the equivalent of gold record status in Norway in one month. Ruth left the band and was replaced by new bassist Michael Bliss, and one more album, Skin, followed in 1996. The band issued one further track in 1998, a collaboration with Brewer & Shipley in a new version of "One Toke Over the Line", before they broke up again.

In 2011, the Rainmakers reformed, with bassist Rich Ruth returning to the group in place of Bliss, while longtime guitarist Steve Phillips was replaced by Jeff Porter. On March 5, the band was inducted into the Kansas Music Hall of Fame, with a ceremony and concert at Liberty Hall in Lawrence, Kansas. The following week, the band's album 25 on was released on March 14. At the end of March, the band returned to Norway for a two-week tour. The band played two shows (May 14–15) at Knuckleheads Saloon in Kansas City.

In 2014, the Rainmakers released the album Monster Movie. In June the same year, they performed at the Sweden Rock Festival.

In 2015 they released the album Cover Band.

Steve Phillips died in 2020 after contracting COVID-19.

== Band members ==
- Bob Walkenhorst: guitar, vocals (1983–1990, 1994–1998, 2011–present)
- Jeff Porter: guitar, vocals (2011–present)
- Rich Ruth: bass, vocals (1983–1990, 1994–1995, 2011–present)
- Pat Tomek: drums (1986–1990, 1994–1998, 2011–present)

Former members

- Steve Phillips: guitar, vocals (1983–1990, 1994–1998)
- Michael Bliss: bass, vocals (1995–1998)

== Discography ==
The Rainmakers have released eight studio albums, two live albums and a compilation album.
