= National Register of Historic Places listings in Carroll County, Missouri =

Location of Carroll County in Missouri

This is a list of the National Register of Historic Places listings in Carroll County, Missouri.

This is intended to be a complete list of the properties and districts on the National Register of Historic Places in Carroll County, Missouri, United States. Latitude and longitude coordinates are provided for many National Register properties and districts; these locations may be seen together in a map.

There are 6 properties and districts listed on the National Register in the county.

This National Park Service list is complete through NPS recent listings posted December 12, 2025.

== Current listings ==
	Name on the Register	Image	Date listed	Location	City or town	Description
1	Carroll County Court House	Carroll County Court House	July 21, 1995 (#95000858)	Courthouse Sq. 39°21′29″N 93°29′47″W	Carrollton	
2	Carroll County Sheriff's Quarters and Jail	Carroll County Sheriff's Quarters and Jail	October 11, 1979 (#79001355)	101 W. Washington St. 39°21′27″N 93°29′48″W	Carrollton	
3	Farmers Bank Building	Farmers Bank Building	July 7, 1994 (#94000702)	114 S. Pine St. 39°18′10″N 93°40′36″W	Norborne	
4	U.S. Post Office	U.S. Post Office	May 12, 1977 (#77001570)	101 N. Folger St. 39°21′22″N 93°29′31″W	Carrollton	
5	Wilcoxson and Company Bank	Wilcoxson and Company Bank	January 21, 1983 (#83000975)	1 W. Washington Ave. 39°21′28″N 93°29′45″W	Carrollton	
6	Wright II Archeological Site		May 27, 1971 (#71000464)	Address Restricted	Miami Station	

== See also ==
- List of National Historic Landmarks in Missouri
- National Register of Historic Places listings in Missouri
