= McGaugh =

McGaugh is a surname. Notable people with the surname include:

- James McGaugh (born 1931), American neuroscientist
- Joe Don McGaugh (born 1983), American politician
- Peggy McGaugh, American politician
- Stacy McGaugh (born 1964), American astronomer
- Wilbur McGaugh (1895–1965), American film actor
