= Amanda Austin =

American painter and sculptor (1859–1917)

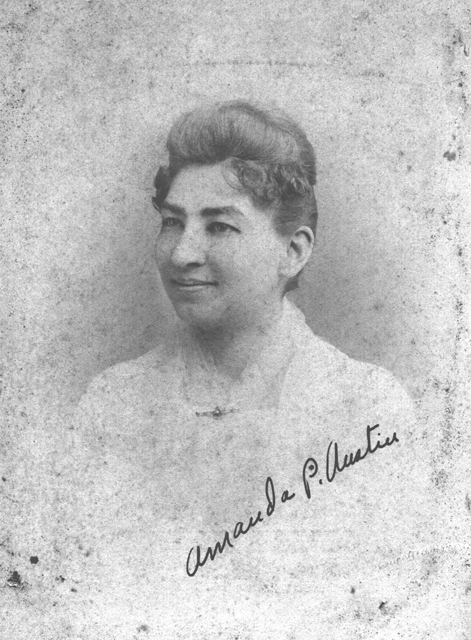
- Born: March 28, 1859; Carrollton, Missouri, U.S.
- Died: March 25, 1917 (aged 57); New York City, U.S.
- Education: University of Missouri
- Known for: Painting; sculpture

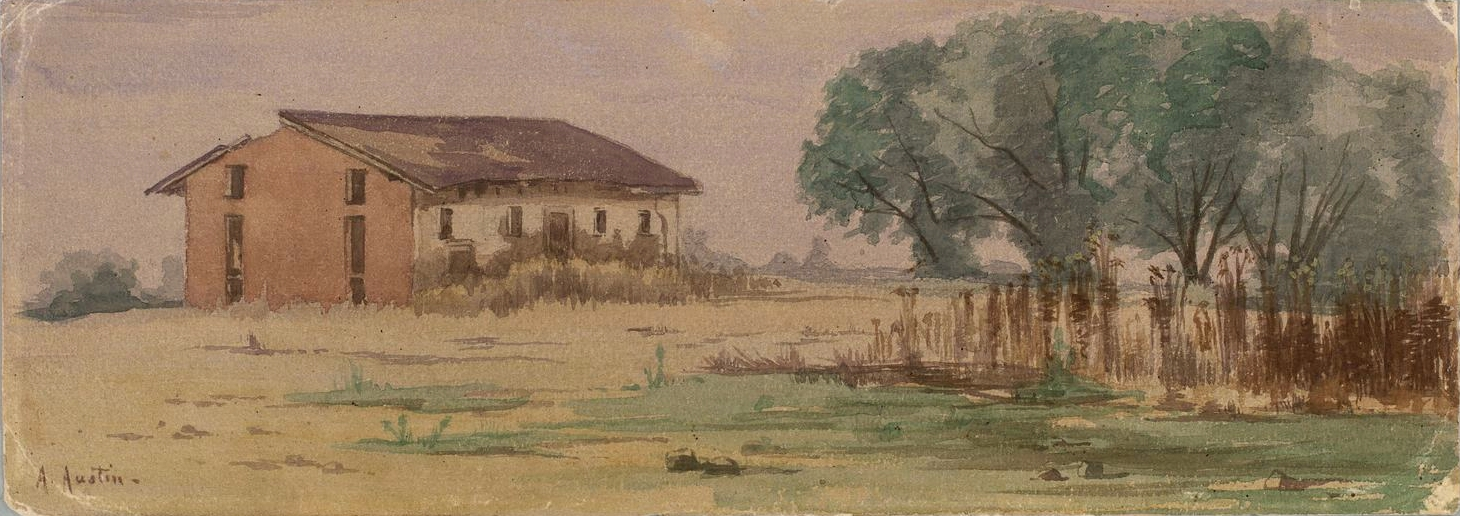
Ruins of Sutter's Fort, c. 1880, watercolor, in the Bancroft Library, Berkeley, California

Amanda Petronella Austin (1859 – 1917) was an American painter and sculptor.

== Biography ==
A native of Carrollton, Missouri, Austin studied from 1877 to 1879 at the University of Missouri, becoming a favored pupil of George Caleb Bingham, to whom she gave two of her paintings. In 1879 she moved to Sacramento, home of her great-uncle, Jefferson Wilcoxson; he was ill, and in return for her care he provided money for her to continue her training, which she did in the studio of Norton Bush.

Her first exposure came at the 1880 California State Fair, where her drawings won praise from the critic of The Sacramento Bee. The following year at the Fair, the showing of her Morning Glories brought her a measure of notoriety. In May 1882 she enrolled in the San Francisco School of Design; she continued to exhibit regularly in Sacramento at this point, and also at the San Francisco Art Association, where she received a gold medal and an honorable mention. Later in 1885 she taught for a few months at the School of Design in Sacramento; on January 16, 1886, she opened her own studio in that town's Oddfellows building. Her painting class attracted many students.

In 1908 Austin went to Paris, where she kept a studio until 1912 and studied with Jean Escoula and Emile Renard. Here she began to work at sculpture, and in 1909 a marble bust of Miss Quinn was accepted for show at the Société Nationale des Beaux-Arts. Its exhibition won her a place in the Union Internationale des Beaux-Artes et des Lettres. In 1912 she returned to Sacramento; Miss Quinn, along with other works, was exhibited at the Panama–Pacific International Exposition. With another sculpture it then traveled to exhibits at the Buffalo Fine Arts Academy and the Art Institute of Chicago. In 1916, with a commission in hand from the city of Sacramento, Austin returned once more to Paris to execute a monument, only to be told by her doctor to return as she was dying of cancer. En route, she died in New York City, three days before turning fifty-eight. On her deathbed Austin married E. Lee Allen. She left all her property to him in her will, but her family contested it. The result was that her works were divided up and her legacy fell into obscurity.

Morning Glories, currently among her works in the collection of the Crocker Art Museum, was included in the inaugural exhibition of the National Museum of Women in the Arts, American Women Artists 1830–1930, in 1987.
