= William Schreiber =

William Schreiber may refer to:

- William Schreiber (volleyball) (born 1942), Romanian Olympic volleyball player
- William F. Schreiber (1925–2009), American electrical engineer and MIT professor
- William R. Schreiber (born 1941), American politician, member of the Minnesota House of Representatives
- William E. Schreiber (1880–?), American college football player and coach
