= Shieldsville Township, Rice County, Minnesota =

Shieldsville Township, Minnesota
- Township
- Location within the state of Minnesota Shieldsville Township, Minnesota (the United States)
- Coordinates: 44°19′22″N 93°27′28″W
- Country: United States
- State: Minnesota
- County: Rice

Area
  - Total: 36.6 sq mi (94.7 km^{2})
  - Land: 32.5 sq mi (84.2 km^{2})
  - Water: 4.1 sq mi (10.5 km^{2})
- Elevation: 1,089 ft (332 m)

Population (2000)
  - Total: 1,153
  - Density: 35/sq mi (13.7/km^{2})
- Time zone: UTC-6 (Central (CST))
  - Summer (DST): UTC-5 (CDT)
- FIPS code: 27-59854
- GNIS feature ID: 0665600

Shieldsville Township is a township in Rice County, Minnesota, United States. The population was 1,153 at the 2000 census.

The unincorporated community of Shieldsville is located within the township.

Settled in the 1850s, Shieldsville Township was named for James Shields (1806–1879), an American politician and U.S. Army officer.

== Geography ==
According to the United States Census Bureau, the township has a total area of 36.5 square miles (94.7 km^{2}), of which 32.5 square miles (84.1 km^{2}) is land and 4.1 square miles (10.5 km^{2}) (11.08%) is water.

== Demographics ==
As of the 2000 census, there were 1,153 people, 424 households, and 334 families residing in the township. The population density was 35.5 inhabitants per square mile (13.7/km^{2}). There were 583 housing units at an average density of 17.9/sq mi (6.9/km^{2}). The racial makeup of the township was 98.70% White, 0.09% African American, 0.17% Asian, 0.52% from other races, and 0.52% from two or more races. Hispanic or Latino of any race were 0.61% of the population.

There were 424 households, out of which 32.5% had children under the age of 18 living with them, 70.3% were married couples living together, 4.2% had a female householder with no husband present, and 21.2% were non-families. 15.1% of all households were made up of individuals, and 5.2% had someone living alone who was 65 years of age or older. The average household size was 2.72 and the average family size was 3.02.

In the township the population was spread out, with 24.5% under the age of 18, 8.1% from 18 to 24, 26.8% from 25 to 44, 29.5% from 45 to 64, and 11.1% who were 65 years of age or older. The median age was 40 years. For every 100 females, there were 109.6 males. For every 100 females age 18 and over, there were 107.1 males.

The median income for a household in the township was $56,250, and the median income for a family was $61,364. Males had a median income of $41,394 versus $25,208 for females. The per capita income for the township was $21,908. About 4.2% of families and 6.8% of the population were below the poverty line, including 3.1% of those under age 18 and 11.9% of those age 65 or over.
