= Bryan Andrews (singer) =

American country singer and activist

- Origin: Carrollton, Missouri
- Genres: Country; Indie rock
- Occupation: Singer
- Years active: 2018–present
- Label: Disruptor Records

Bryan Andrews is an American country music singer and activist. He is best known for his politically-themed songs, often from his own progressive left-wing viewpoint. Many of his songs have been described as protest songs.

== Biography ==
Andrews is from Carrollton, Missouri, a town of about 3500 people, and has described himself as having deep connections to the farming community due to his grandparents. His mother worked as a choir teacher, and his father as a band teacher. He dropped out of the University of Central Missouri twice while struggling with addiction to pain pills. He worked as a welder for approximately five years while performing his country songs.

He first went viral for his song "The Older I Get." He has stated that, after initially writing it, he updated it after the United States Department of Justice stated the Epstein files don't exist. This song topped both the Billboard Digital Song Sales and Country Digital Song Sales charts, while Andrews topped the Emerging Artists chart. His manager was also named Executive of the Week by Billboard for this success.

He became further known for his song "Yeehaw", which has been addressed as being outlaw country, and his "fiery" single "Are We Great Yet?", which he released in 2026.

In April 2026, he went on a Midwest tour, dubbed the "ICE Out of My Country Damn Music" Tour. He has pledged to donate a percentage of the proceeds to Human Rights First.

In June 2026, Andrews performed at CMA Fest. His performance opened with snippets of speeches by Donald Trump, and featured a speech from Tennessee State Representative Justin J. Pearson, D-Memphis.

He released his first album, Independence Day, which he described as a mixtape, in 2026. It received a positive review from Entertainment Focus, which dubbed it a "cohesive artistic statement" with "unfiltered lyricism". As of July 2026, few other reviewers have reviewed the album.

He also announced his "Taking the Flag Back" U.S. tour, set to occur in November and December 2026.

He is an outspoken progressive: most of his songs incorporate progressive ideas into them. He has been described as "anti-MAGA" and anti-ICE, and has been dubbed "one of the most outspoken voices in country music". He has stated that "everything is political". He has also stated that he has received death threats for his songs.

As of 2026, he had more than 5 million followers on social media. However, few of them have attended his concerts. In 2024, Andrews canceled six of the eight shows he planned for the year due to low ticket sales and low demand, including a planned performance in Chicago, Illinois, that only sold two tickets before he canceled the show. Although he later sold 100 tickets when he returned to Chicago in 2026, he was unable to capture the success he experienced on social media.

He is signed to WME Group and Disruptor Records.

== Discography ==
Mixtapes

- Independence Day (2026)

EPs

- Carroll County Sessions (2022)

Singles

- "Left Right Left" (2026)
- "If Heaven's a Country Club" (2026)
- "Not See" (2026)
- "Yeehaw'" (2026)
- "Are We Great Yet?" (2026)
- "Grizzly Can" (2025)
- "The Older I Get" (2025)
- "Blue" (2025)
- "Hey, Mom" (2024)
