= Morton S. Wilkinson =

American politician

Morton Smith Wilkinson
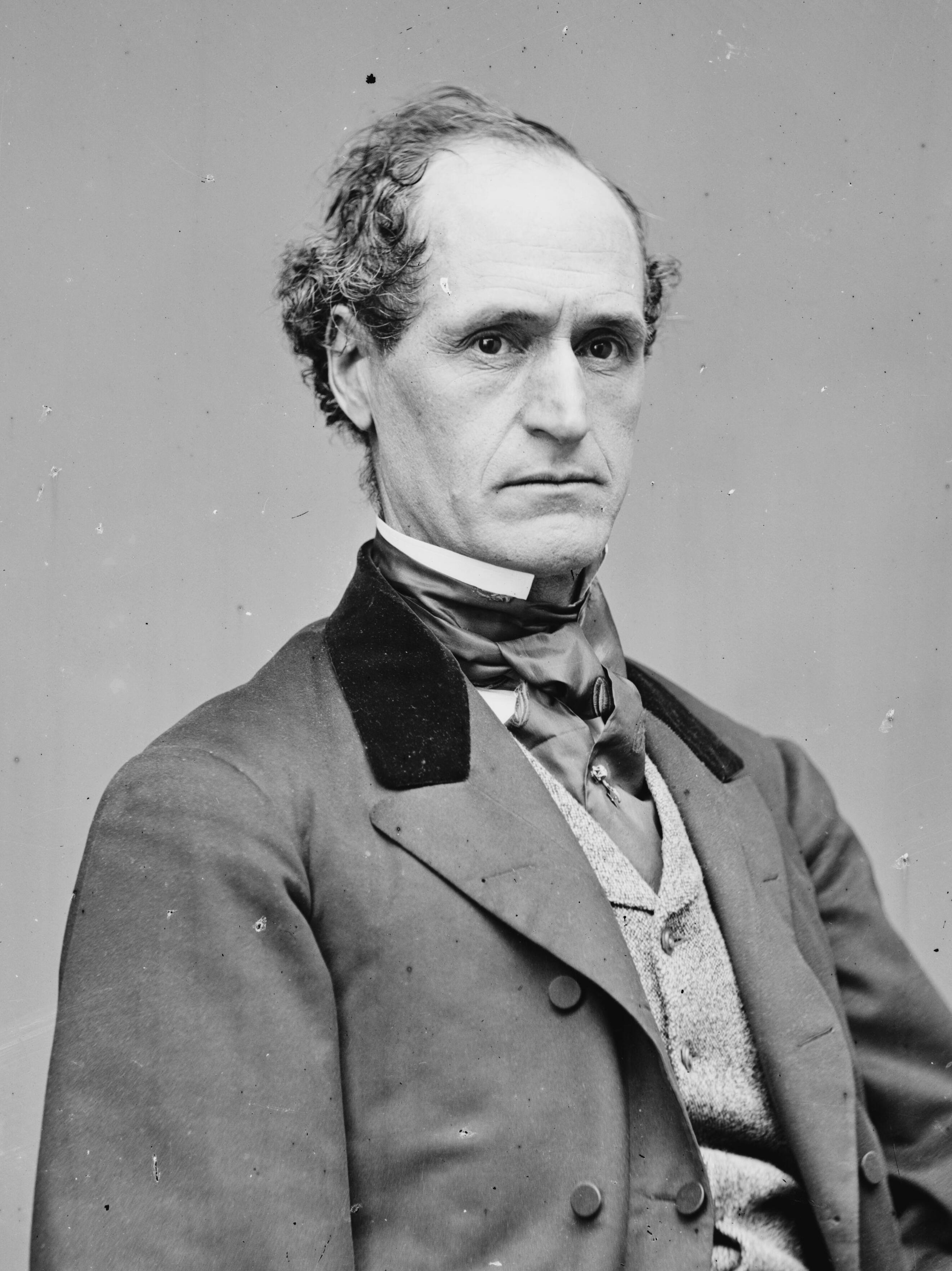

Member of the U.S. House of Representatives from Minnesota's 1st district
- In office March 4, 1869 – March 3, 1871
- Preceded by: William Windom
- Succeeded by: Mark H. Dunnell

United States Senator from Minnesota
- In office March 4, 1859 – March 3, 1865
- Preceded by: James Shields
- Succeeded by: Daniel S. Norton

Member of the Minnesota Senate
- In office 1874–1877

Personal details
- Born: January 22, 1819 Skaneateles, New York, U.S.
- Died: February 4, 1894 (aged 75) Mankato, Minnesota, U.S.
- Party: Republican

Morton Smith Wilkinson (January 22, 1819 – February 4, 1894) was an American politician. Wilkinson was most well known for serving as a U.S. senator for Minnesota from 1859 to 1865 and for representing Minnesota's 1st congressional district in the United States House of Representatives from 1869 to 1871. He also served in the Minnesota Senate from 1874 to 1877.

== Biography ==
Born in Skaneateles, New York, he moved to Illinois in 1837 and was employed in railroad work for two years. Upon returning to Skaneateles in 1840, he studied law, was admitted to the bar in 1842, and commenced practice in Eaton Rapids, Michigan in 1843. He moved to Stillwater, Minnesota in 1847.

Wilkinson was elected to the first legislature of Minnesota Territory in 1849 and served as Register of Deeds of Ramsey County 1851 – 1853. After moving to Mankato, Minnesota in 1858, he served as a member of the board of commissioners to prepare a code of laws for the Territory of Minnesota in 1858.

After winning the 1859 Senate election in Minnesota he served in the United States Senate from March 4, 1859 to March 3, 1865, as a Republican from Minnesota, in the 36th, 37th and 38th congresses, but was an unsuccessful candidate for reelection. In the Senate, he was chairman of the Committee on Revolutionary Claims. He was a member of the United States House of Representatives from March 4, 1869 to March 3, 1871, but unsuccessful candidate for renomination in 1870.

Wilkinson moved to Wells, Minnesota, and was member of the Minnesota State Senate 1874 – 1877 as well as a prosecuting attorney of Faribault County 1880 – 1884. He died in Mankato, Minnesota on February 4, 1894, and was interred in Glenwood Cemetery, Mankato, Blue Earth County, Minnesota.

U.S. Senate
Preceded by James Shields	U.S. senator (Class 2) from Minnesota; 1859 – 1865; Served alongside: Henry Mower Rice, Alexander Ramsey	Succeeded by Daniel S. Norton
U.S. House of Representatives
Preceded by William Windom	U.S. Representative from Minnesota's 1st congressional district 1869 – 1871	Succeeded by Mark H. Dunnell
