= Roscoe P. Conkling =

American judge (1889–1954)

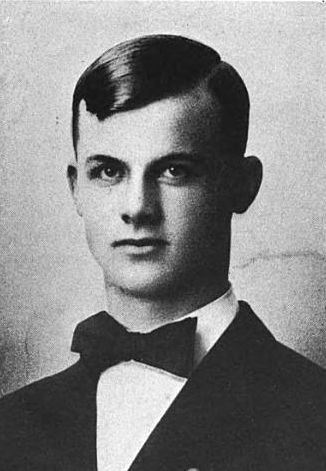
- Conkling in 1913 at age 24

Judge of the Supreme Court of Missouri
- In office January 1, 1947 – October 28, 1954
- Preceded by: Ernest S. Gantt
- Succeeded by: Henry J. Westhues

Personal details
- Born: Roscoe Powers Conkling; May 3, 1889 Carrollton, Missouri, U.S.
- Died: October 28, 1954 (aged 65) Jefferson City, Missouri, U.S.
- Spouse: Mildred Scott (m. 1914)
- Education: University of Missouri (LLB)

Military service
- Allegiance: United States
- Branch/service: United States Army
- Rank: Private
- Battles/wars: World War I

Roscoe Powers Conkling (May 3, 1889 – October 28, 1954) was a justice of the Missouri Supreme Court from 1947 to 1954, including a period as chief justice.

== Biography ==
Conkling was born on May 3, 1889, in Carrollton, Missouri, to Virgil Marcellus Conkling and Alpha Ann Powers. He attended school there and, from 1905, in Kansas City, Missouri. He graduated in Law from the University of Missouri in 1912 and began practicing law that year in Kansas City. After army service in the Field Artillery during World War I, he returned to legal practice and moved to St Joseph in 1924. He became prosecuting attorney for Jackson County and special commissioner of the Missouri Supreme Court. He also served as a member of the State Board of Bar Examiners (1926–30), and as president of the Buchanan County Bar Association.

He was appointed to the Missouri Supreme Court under the states non-partisan court plan on January 1, 1947, during the first term of Governor Phil M. Donnelly. He was re-elected to the court on November 2, 1948, for a 12-year term, and had recently completed his turn as chief justice of the court when he died. He was awarded an honorary degree from William Jewell College in 1954.

Conkling married Mildred Scott in 1914, and they had two daughters. He had a heart attack and died on his way to St. Mary's Hospital on October 28, 1954, in Jefferson City, Missouri.
