= Leonard Volk =

American sculptor (1828–1895)

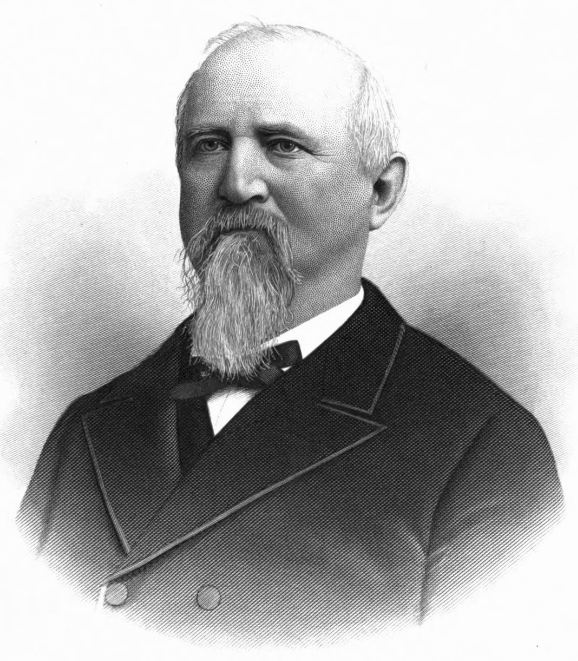
- Born: November 7, 1828; Wellstown (now Wells), New York, US
- Died: August 19, 1895 (aged 66); Osceola, Wisconsin, US
- Known for: Sculpting
- Spouse: Emily Clarissa King Barlow (m. 1852; died 1894)
- Children: Stephen Douglas Volk

Signature
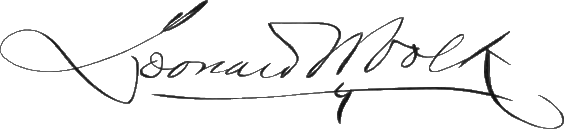

Leonard Wells Volk (November 7, 1828 – August 19, 1895) was an American sculptor. He is notable for making one of only two life masks of United States President Abraham Lincoln. In 1867 he helped establish the Chicago Academy of Design and served as its president until 1878. He made several large monumental sculptures, including the tomb of the politician Stephen A. Douglas, and statues of American Civil War figures.

== Biography ==
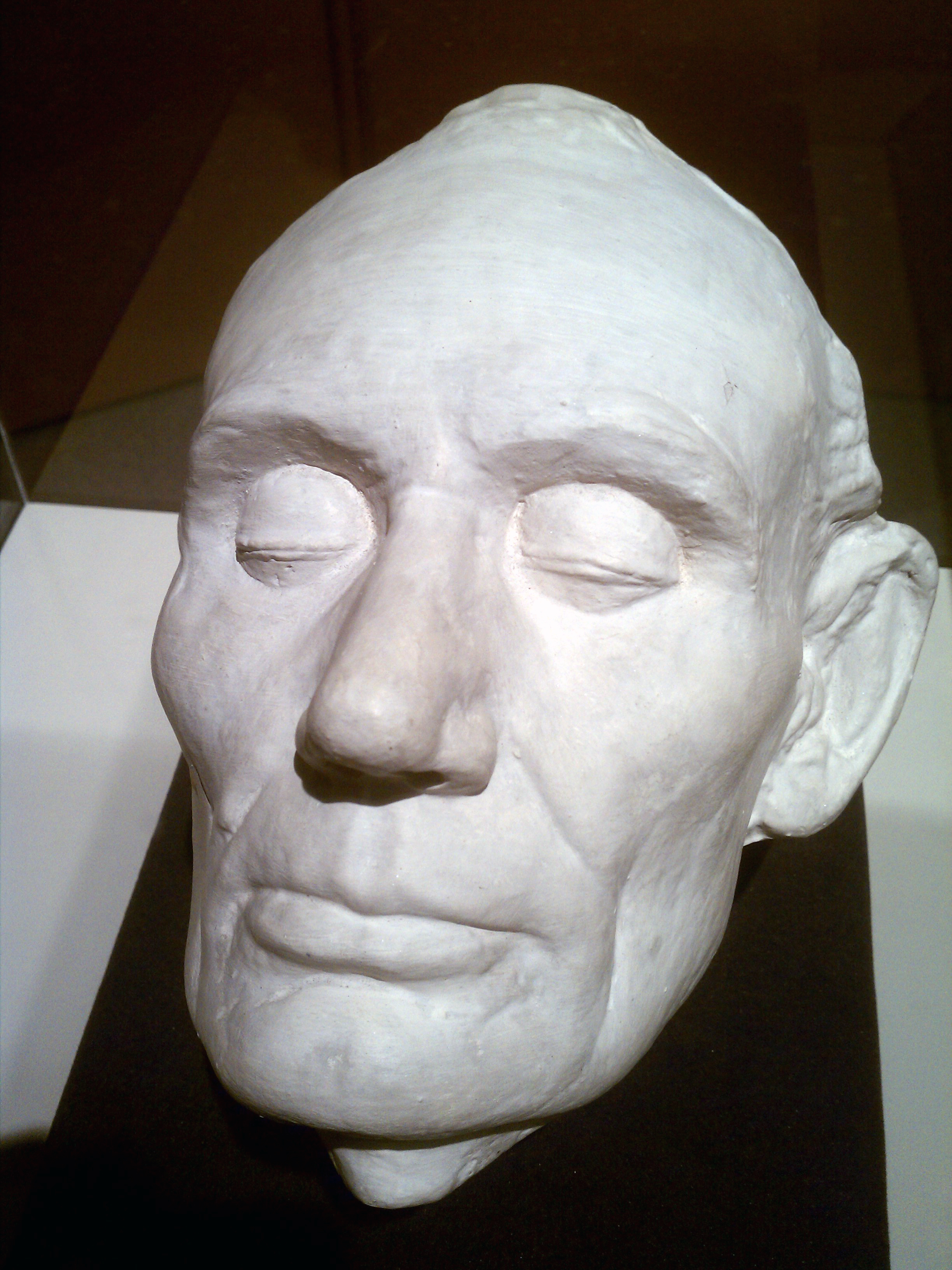
Life mask of Abraham Lincoln, made in 1860

Volk was born at Wellstown (now Wells), Hamilton County, New York to Garrett and Elizabeth (née Gesner) Volk. He first followed the trade of a marble cutter with his father in Pittsfield, Massachusetts, where the family moved.

=== Marriage and family ===
In 1852, Volk married Emily Clarissa King Barlow, daughter of Honor (née Douglas) and Dr. Jonathan King Barlow of Bethany, New York. Her maternal cousin, Stephen A. Douglas, was a nationally known politician who ran against Republican Abraham Lincoln as the Democratic Party presidential nominee in 1860.

Their son, Stephen A. Douglas Volk (1856–1935), as an adult became notable as a figure and portrait painter. He studied under Jean-Léon Gérôme in Paris. Later he helped establish the Minneapolis School of Design.

Emily died in May 1894.

=== Career ===
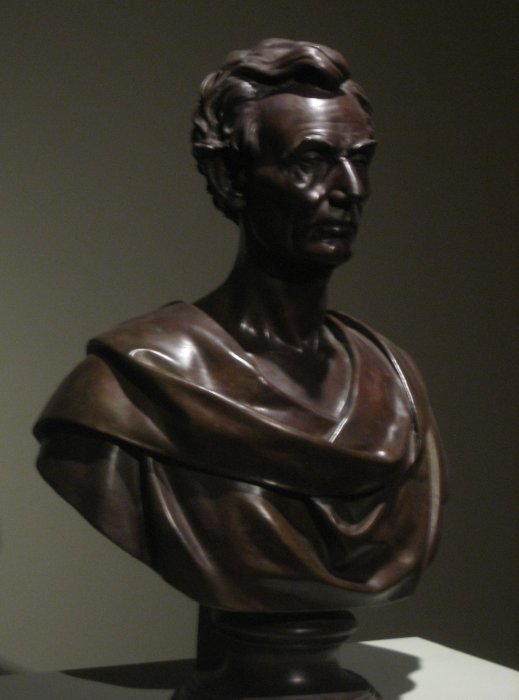
Bronze bust of Lincoln by Leonard Volk, 1860, El Paso Museum of Art

In 1848, Volk moved west and opened an artist's studio in St Louis, Missouri. From 1855 to 1857, Stephen A. Douglas, his wife's cousin, supported the family's travel to Rome so that Volk could pursue additional study.

Returning to the United States in 1857, Volk and his family settled in the booming city of Chicago, where he helped to establish the Chicago Academy of Design, precursor to the School of the Art Institute of Chicago. For eight years, he served as its director and taught numerous students.

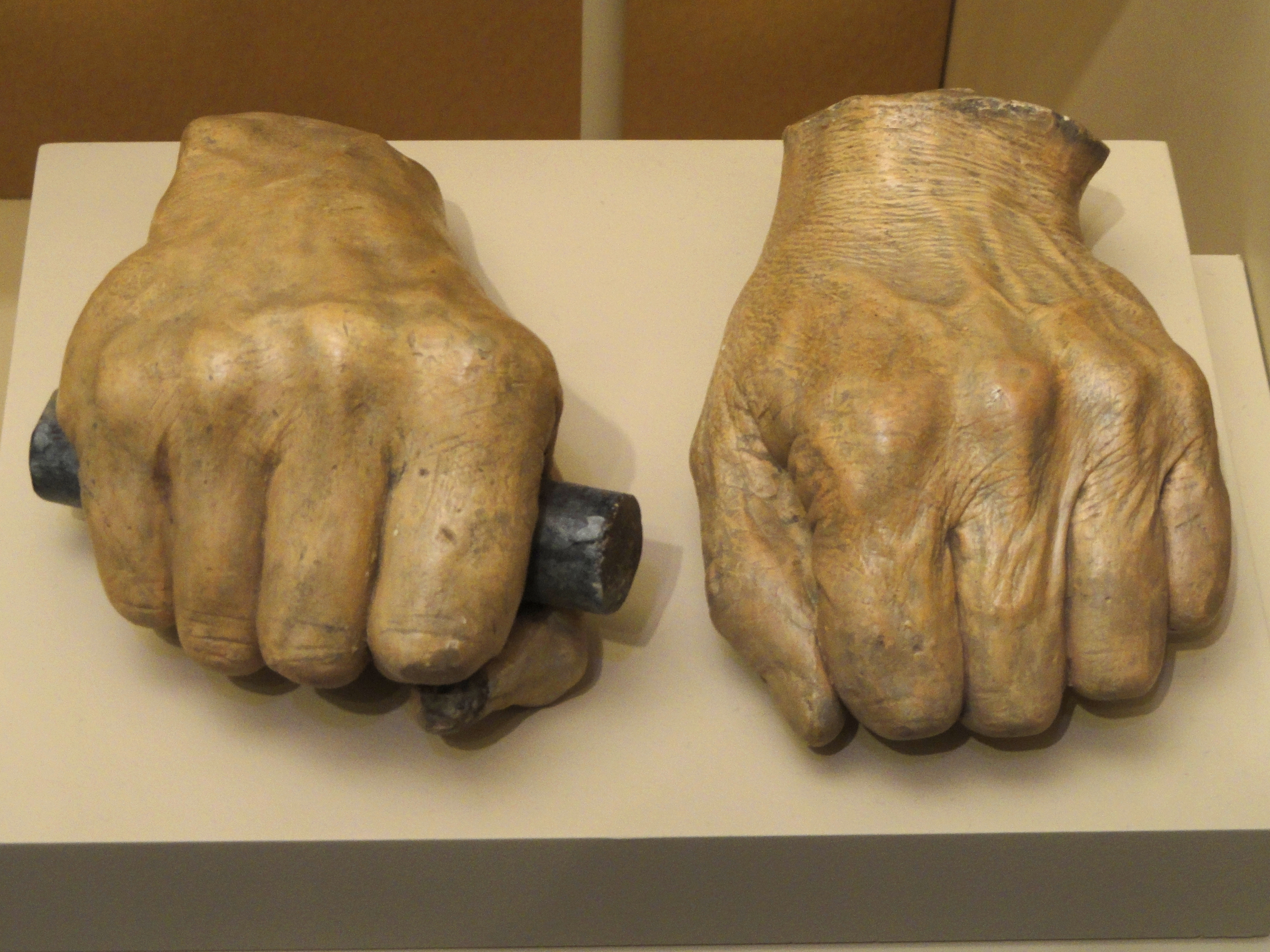
Casts of Lincoln's hands

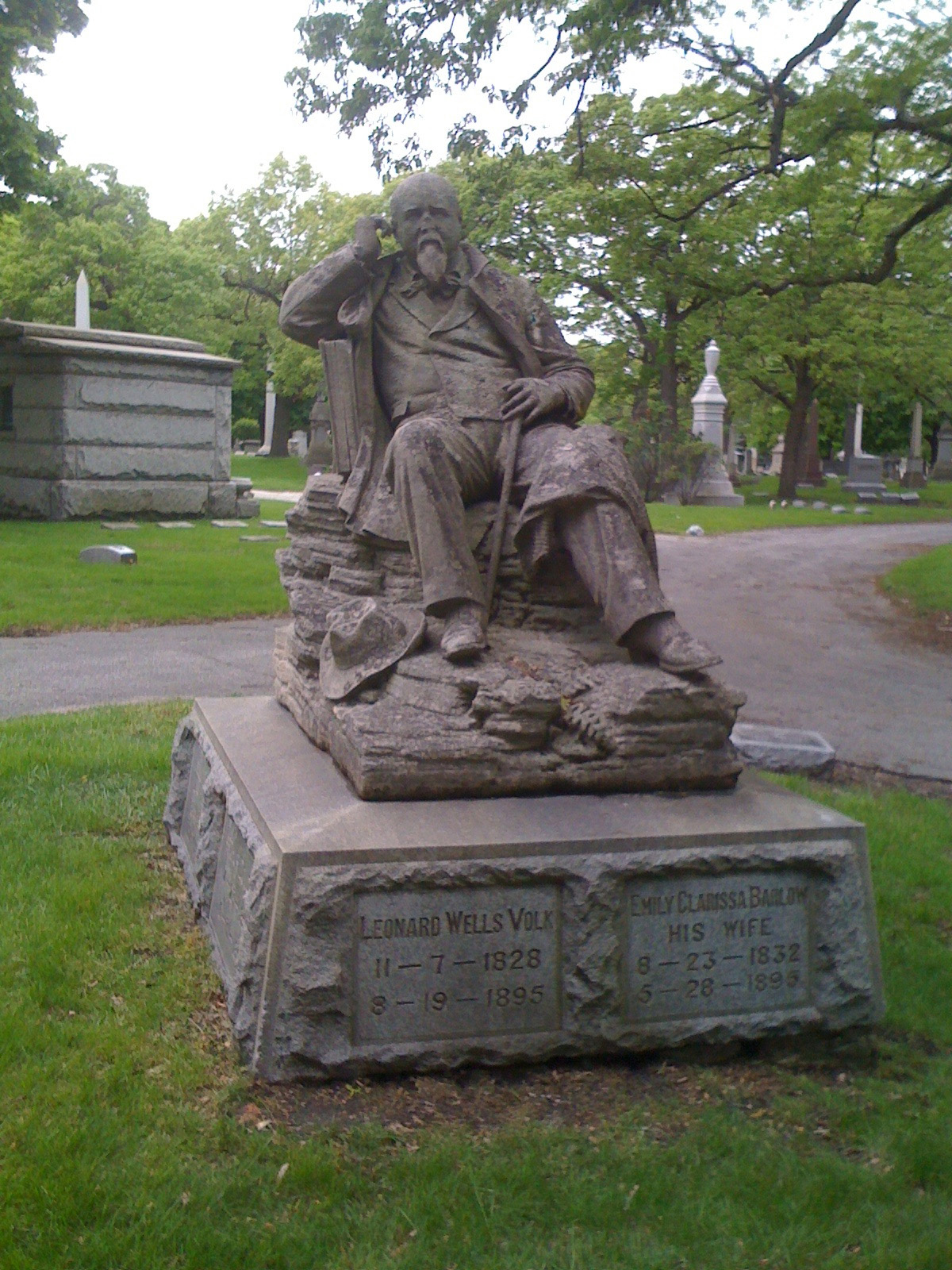
Memorial of Leonard Volk in Rosehill Cemetery, Chicago, Illinois

In 1860 Volk made a life mask of Abraham Lincoln. Only one other was made, by Clark Mills in 1865. In the early part of spring 1860, during Lincoln's visit to Chicago, Volk asked him to sit for a bust. The artist decided to start by doing a life mask. Lincoln found the process of letting wet plaster dry on his face, followed by a skin-stretching removal process, "anything but agreeable". Volk later used the life mask and bust of 1860 as the basis for other versions of Lincoln, including a full-size statue. The life mask was also studied by other artists, such as Daniel Chester French.

In mid-May 1860, Volk went to Springfield, Illinois to present the Lincolns with the completed cabinet bust. He had just received the nomination as presidential candidate for the Republican Party. The following day, Volk asked Lincoln to allow a casting of both his hands, for use in other sculptural works. He wanted Lincoln to hold something to simulate grasping a document in his right hand. Lincoln came back from his tool shed with a whittled piece of broom handle. The casting for Lincoln's right hand was made as he held the broom handle. Lincoln's left hand was cast slightly closed but empty.

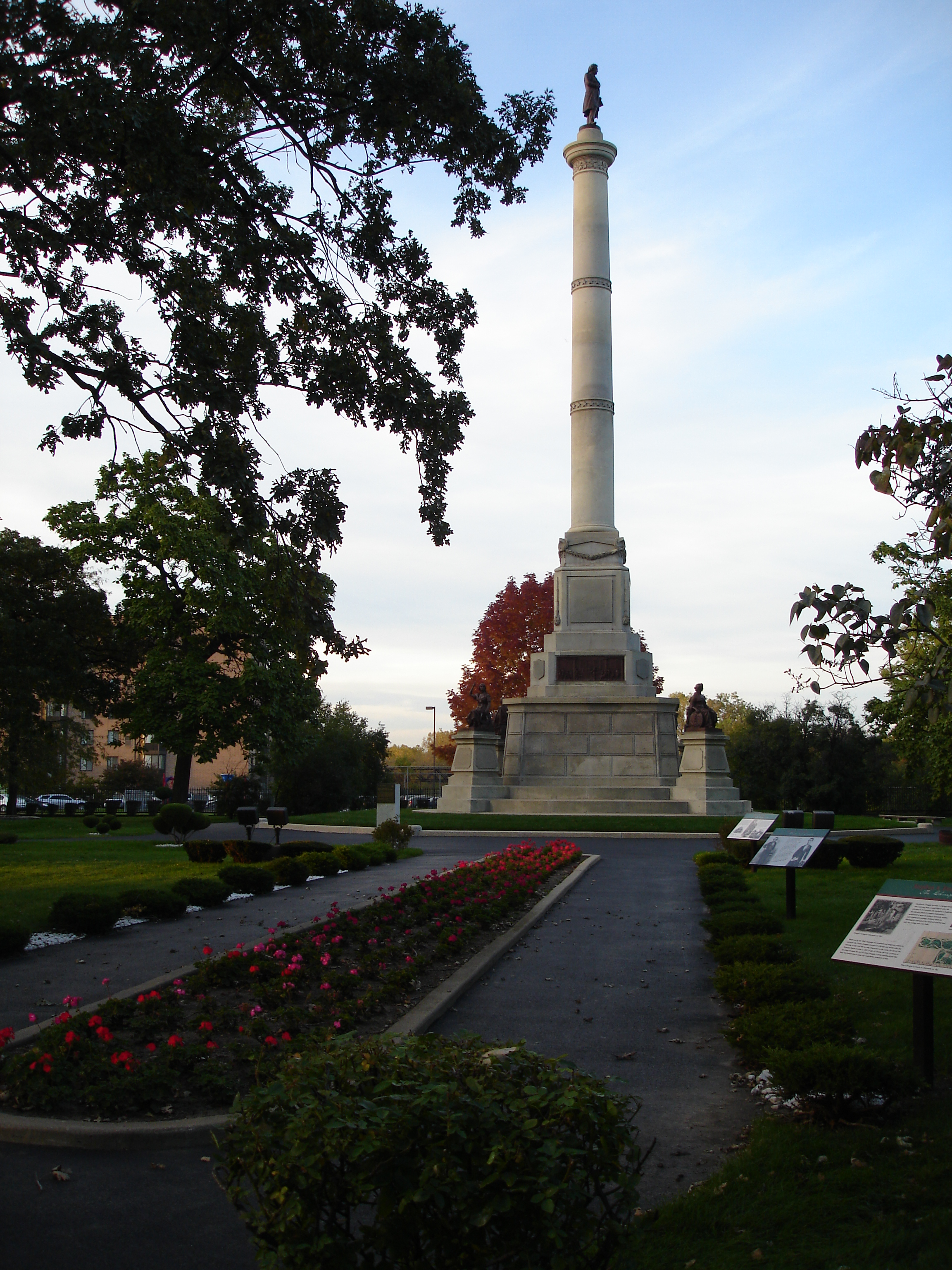
Stephen A. Douglas Tomb, Chicago, Illinois

Leonard Volk died in Osceola, Wisconsin on August 19, 1895, and was buried at Rosehill Cemetery in Chicago.

== Works ==
- Stephen A. Douglas Tomb in Chicago, Illinois
- Soldiers' and Sailors' Monument in Rochester, New York
- statues of Abraham Lincoln and Stephen A. Douglas in the Illinois State Capitol in Springfield, Illinois
- statue of General James Shields in Statuary Hall, United States Capitol
- statues of Elihu B. Washburne, Zachariah Chandler and David Davis
- Stephen Douglas's original life mask taken in Chicago (from the Collections at the Library of Congress)
- Modeling Tools made by Leonard Wells Volk and used by him in making the life mask of Abraham Lincoln and Stephen A. Douglas and all his other works. From the Collections at the Library of Congress
- Hickory Mallet used by Leonard Wells Volk in making his busts of Lincoln and Douglas. From the Collections at the Library of Congress
