= Jeremy Clevenger =

American politician

Member-elect of the Missouri House of Representatives from the 7th district
- Assuming office January 6, 2027
- Succeeding: Peggy McGaugh

Personal details
- Party: Republican
- Website: www.jeremyclevenger.com

Jeremy Clevenger is an American politician of the Missouri Republican Party who is the representative-elect for the 7th district in the Missouri House of Representatives. He was elected in the 2026 general election. He is an accountant.
