= Shieldsville, Minnesota =

- Unincorporated community
- Location within Minnesota Location within the United States
- Coordinates: 44°21′58″N 93°24′32″W
- Country: United States
- State: Minnesota
- County: Rice County
- Township: Shieldsville Township
- Elevation: 1,093 ft (333 m)
- Time zone: UTC-6 (Central (CST))
  - Summer (DST): UTC-5 (CDT)
- ZIP code: 55021 and 56052
- Area code: 507
- GNIS feature ID: 651981

Shieldsville is an unincorporated community in Shieldsville Township, Rice County, Minnesota, United States.

The center of Shieldsville is generally considered near the junction of State Highway 21 (MN 21) and Rice County Road 10 (Dodd Road). Other routes include County Roads 37, 38, and 67.

Nearby places include Faribault, Kilkenny, Waterville, and Montgomery. Shieldsville is located in section 1 of Shieldsville Township.

== History ==
Shieldsville, named after its founder, American politician and U.S. Army officer, James Shields, was platted in 1856. It was founded around the Irish St. Patrick Catholic Church.

In the settlement's early years, land within the area was sold for $2.00 per acre with the mission of attracting Irish immigrants to settle in the area.

The population in 1870 was 110.

On July 29, 2002, The St. Patrick Church of Shieldsville was hit by lightning for the second time in its history and was severely destroyed. It was rebuilt two years later on August 1, 2004.

== Arts and culture ==
Shieldsville holds a Fall Festival for the town and the surrounding area every September 29.
