= John H. Stringfellow =

American physician

John H. Stringfellow (November 14, 1819 – July 24, 1905) was an early physician of Kansas, one of the founders of Atchison, and speaker of the house in the first territorial legislature, the pro-slavery Bogus Legislature. He was born in Culpeper County, Virginia, son of Robert Stringfellow, a farmer, veteran of the War of 1812, merchant at Raccoon Ford on the Rapidan River, and Mary Plunkett, daughter of an early industrialist in Orange County, Virginia. Benjamin Franklin Stringfellow was his younger brother. He was educated at Caroline Academy, Va., and Columbia University, and graduated from the medical department of the University of Pennsylvania in 1845. Soon after, he relocated to Carrollton, Missouri, where he married Ophelia J. Simmons, the niece of Missouri Governor John C. Edwards.

During the cholera epidemic of 1849, when every boat coming up the river unloaded cholera patients, he converted a large warehouse into a hospital and devoted three months to caring for them. In 1852, he moved to Platte City. Upon the organization of the Kansas Territory in 1854, he crossed the Missouri River, selected a claim, and, in connection with some friends, formed a town company which laid out the town of Atchison. In 1854, he brought his family to Atchison and lived there until 1858. He was the founder and editor of the pro-slavery Squatter Sovereign, the first newspaper in Atchison, and was commissioned colonel of the Third regiment of the territorial militia by Gov. Shannon. He was called to Virginia by the death of his father in 1858 and was detained there until after the outbreak of the Civil War. He entered Confederate service as captain of a Virginia company, but was at once detailed as a surgeon and served in that capacity only. In 1871, he returned to Atchison and remained there until 1876. He then moved to St. Joseph, Missouri, where he died on July 24, 1905.

== See also ==
- Bleeding Kansas
- Border ruffians
