= 1859 United States Senate election in Minnesota =

- December 15, 1859

Majority vote of the Minnesota Legislature needed to win
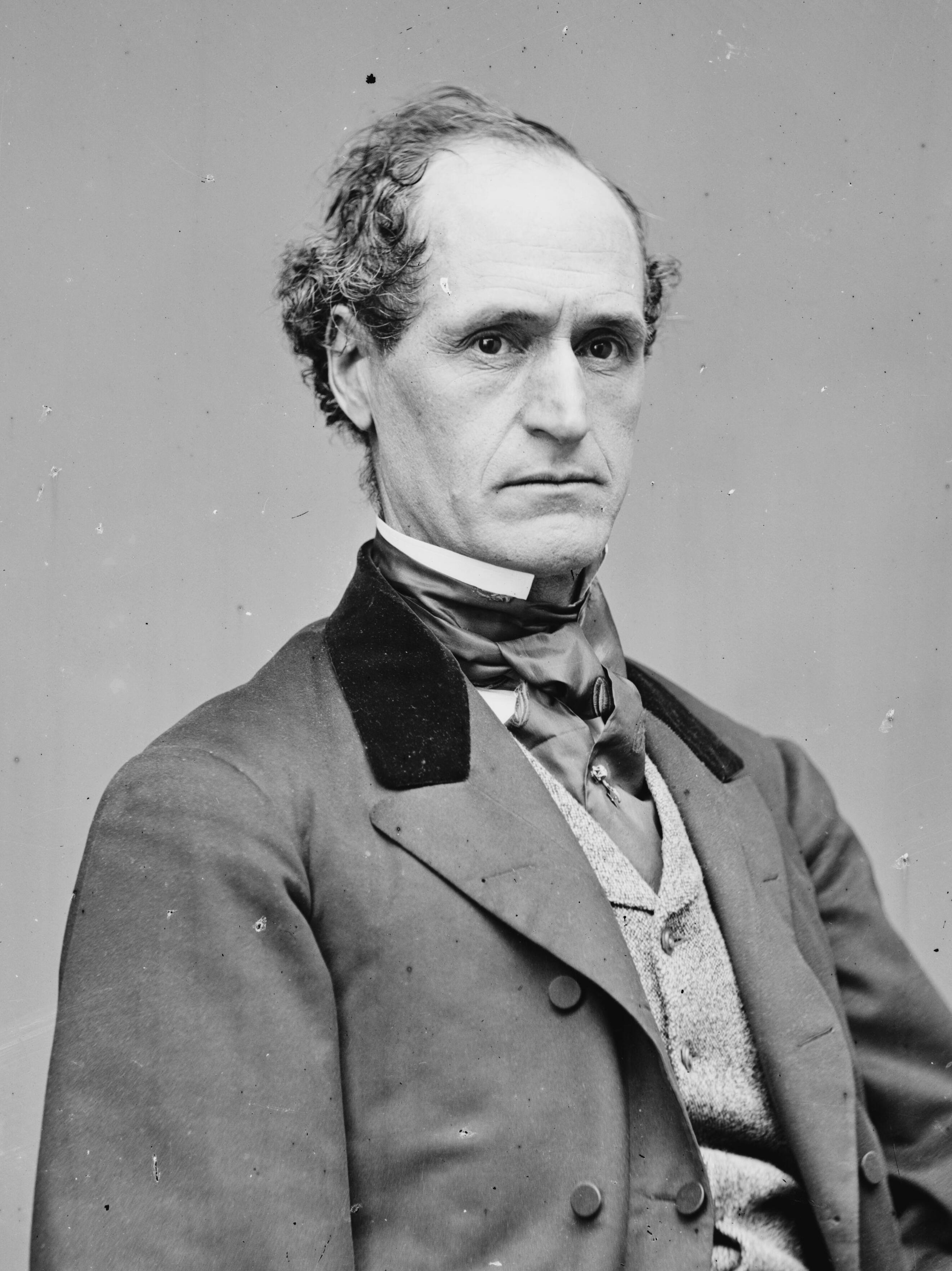

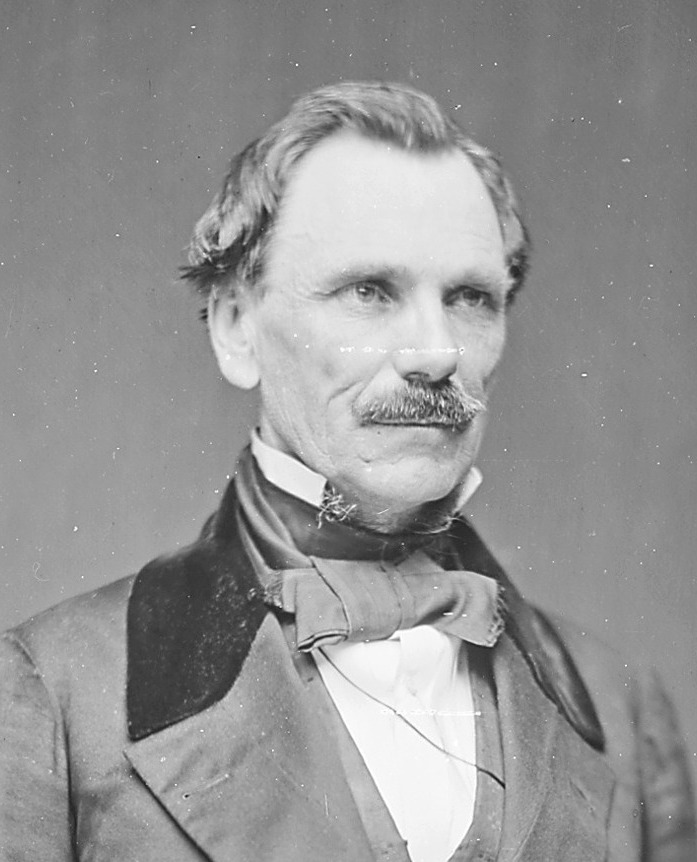
Nominee	Morton S. Wilkinson	James Shields
Party	Republican	Democratic
Electoral vote	79	33
Percentage	69.9%	29.2%
Senator before election
James Shields
Democratic
Elected Senator
Morton S. Wilkinson
Republican

The 1859 United States Senate election in Minnesota took place for the state's Class II seat on December 15, 1859, by the Minnesota legislature in a joint convention. Democratic incumbent James Shields drew the short-term Class II seat lot (expiring March 3, 1859) when he was elected on December 19, 1857, prior to Minnesota statehood.

== Candidates ==
=== Democrat ===
- Willis A. Gorman, former Minnesota Territorial Governor (1853–1857)
- James Shields, U.S. Senator since 1858, former Governor of Oregon Territory (1848–1849), former U.S. Senator from Illinois (1849–1855)

=== Republican ===
- Morton S. Wilkinson, Attorney from Stillwater, former Minnesota territorial Representative from the 2nd House District (1849–1850), former Ramsey County Register of Deeds (1851–1853)

== Results ==
1859 Minnesota U.S. Senate Election
Republican	Morton S. Wilkinson	79	69.91
Democrat	James Shields (inc.)	33	29.20
Democrat	Willis A. Gorman	1	0.88
Total Votes		133	100.0
