= James Shields (politician, born 1806) =

Irish-American politician and soldier (1806-1879)

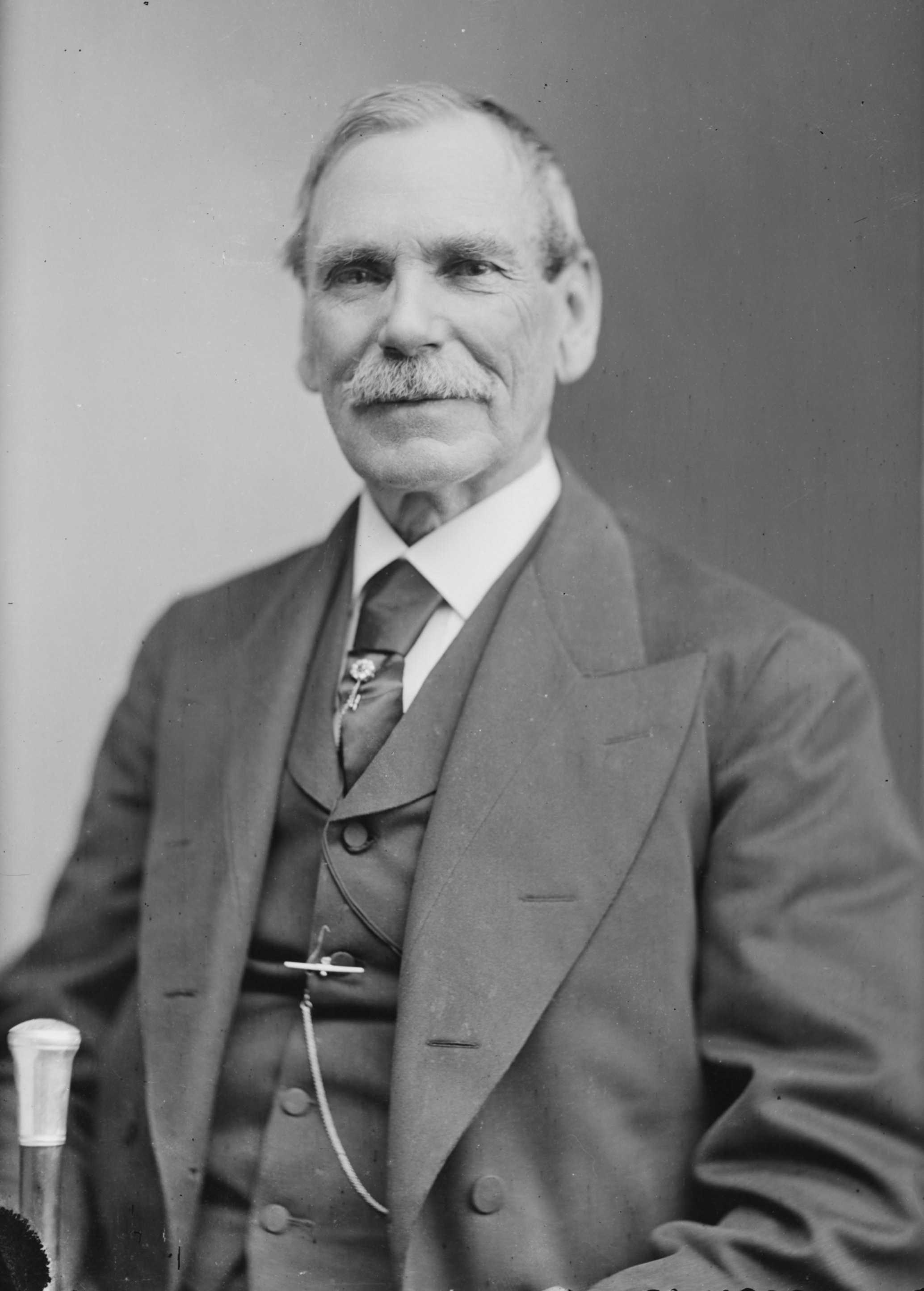

United States Senator
- In office January 27, 1879 – March 3, 1879
- Preceded by: David H. Armstrong
- Succeeded by: George Graham Vest
- Constituency: Missouri
- In office May 11, 1858 (Note: Shadow Senator from the Minnesota Territory from December 19, 1857, to May 11, 1858.) – March 3, 1859
- Preceded by: Seat established
- Succeeded by: Morton S. Wilkinson
- Constituency: Minnesota
- In office October 27, 1849 – March 3, 1855
- Preceded by: Himself
- Succeeded by: Lyman Trumbull
- Constituency: Illinois
- In office March 4, 1849 – March 15, 1849
- Preceded by: Sidney Breese
- Succeeded by: Himself
- Constituency: Illinois

Commissioner of the General Land Office
- In office April 16, 1845 – January 5, 1847
- President: James K. Polk
- Preceded by: Thomas H. Blake
- Succeeded by: Richard M. Young

Auditor of Illinois
- In office 1841–1843
- Governor: Thomas Carlin; Thomas Ford
- Preceded by: Levi Davis
- Succeeded by: William Lee D. Ewing

Personal details
- Born: May 10, 1806 Altmore, Ireland
- Died: June 1, 1879 (aged 73) Ottumwa, Iowa, U.S.
- Party: Democratic
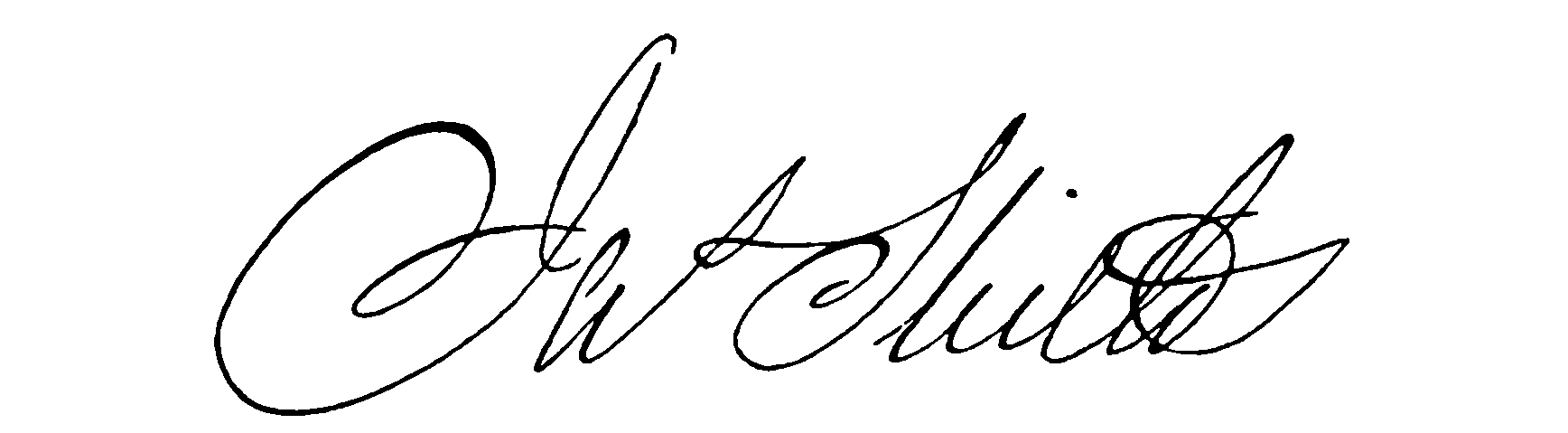
- Signature

Military service
- Allegiance: United States
- Branch/service: United States Army; Union Army
- Years of service: 1835–1842; 1846–1848; 1861–1862
- Rank: Brigadier general
- Battles/wars: Second Seminole War; Mexican–American War; Battle of Veracruz; Battle of Cerro Gordo (WIA); Battle of Contreras; Battle of Churubusco; Battle of Chapultepec; American Civil War; Shenandoah Valley Campaign (WIA)

James Shields (May 10, 1806 (Note: There are conflicting reports about James Shields's date of birth. Some list it as May 6, 1806, May 12, 1806, and others in 1810.) – June 1, 1879) was an Irish American politician and United States Army officer, who is the only person in U.S. history to serve as a senator for three different states, and one of only two to represent multiple states in the U.S. Senate (the other being Waitman T. Willey). A member of the Democratic Party, Shields represented Illinois from 1849 to 1855, in the 31st, 32nd, and 33rd Congresses, Minnesota from 1858 to 1859, in the 35th Congress, and Missouri in 1879, in the 45th Congress.

Born and initially educated in Ireland, Shields emigrated to the Americas in 1826. He was briefly a sailor, and spent time in Quebec, before settling in Kaskaskia, Illinois, where he studied and practiced law. In 1836, he was elected to the Illinois House of Representatives, and later as State Auditor. His work as auditor was criticized by a young Abraham Lincoln, who (with his then fiancée, Mary Todd) published a series of inflammatory pseudonymous letters in a local paper. Shields challenged Lincoln to a duel, and the two nearly fought on September 22, 1842, before making peace, and eventually becoming friends.

In 1845, Shields was appointed to the Illinois Supreme Court, from which he resigned to become Commissioner of the U.S. United States General Land Office. At the outbreak of the Mexican–American War, he left the Land Office to take an appointment as brigadier general of volunteers. He served with distinction and was twice wounded. In 1848, Shields was appointed to and confirmed by the Senate as the first governor of the Oregon Territory, which he declined. After serving as Senator from Illinois, he moved to Minnesota and founded the town of Shieldsville there. He was then elected as Senator from Minnesota. He served in the American Civil War, and at the Battle of Kernstown, his troops inflicted the only tactical defeat of Stonewall Jackson in the war (although he had been wounded the day before and was not present on the battlefield). Shields resigned his commission shortly thereafter due to a dispute over a promotion. After moving multiple times, Shields settled in Missouri and served again for three months in the Senate. He died in 1879 and represents Illinois in the National Statuary Hall.

== Early life and career ==
Shields was born in Altmore, County Tyrone, Ireland, to parents Charles Shiells/O'Shiells/Shields and Anne McDonnell, the first of three children. As his father died when Shields was six, his uncle, also named James Shields and also born in Ireland, played a large role in his life. The elder Shields was a professor of Greek and Latin, and served as a Congressman from Ohio.

The younger Shields obtained early schooling at a hedge school near his home, later at a school run by a clergyman from Maynooth College, and subsequently his uncle. He was educated in military science, fencing, and the French language by a veteran of the Napoleonic Wars, of which there were many in Ireland at the time. Shields attempted to emigrate to the United States in 1822, but failed when his ship was driven aground off the coast of Scotland, leaving him one of only either three or four survivors. (Note: At least two sources report three total survivors. At least one source reports four total survivors.) He successfully made it to America around 1826, although his uncle whom he had sailed to meet had died. (Note: It is not clear how or when Shields learned of his uncle's death. One source reports he simply failed to find his uncle. Another reports he wrote his uncle, never received word back from him, and was unaware of his death so that a relative traveled from Ireland to South Carolina to tend to the late uncle's belongings.)

Shields took a job as a sailor, becoming a purser on a merchant ship. However, after a time, an accident left Shields disabled, and in the hospital with both legs broken for three months. (Note: Shields became such an expert sailor that many years later he was placed in command of a ship and sailed it safely into port. One account has him sailing it with all the officers disabled. Another has Shields taking command when the captain and mate disagreed about how to handle the ship.) After the accident, he volunteered and fought in the Second Seminole War, reaching the rank of lieutenant.

He spent some time in Quebec, founding a fencing school. Eventually, Shields settled in Kaskaskia, Randolph County, Illinois, where he studied and began practicing law in 1832, supplementing his income by teaching French. He served as a member of the Illinois House of Representatives, beginning in 1836, and in 1839 was elected as state auditor. As auditor, Shields was involved in correcting the state's finances following the Panic of 1837. This was done, at times, through practices that proved unpopular.

=== Duel with Abraham Lincoln ===
Shields almost fought a duel on September 22, 1842, with Abraham Lincoln, then a young lawyer in Springfield, Illinois. Lincoln had published an inflammatory letter in a local newspaper, the Sangamo Journal, that attacked Shields, impersonating a local farmer, and taking the pseudonym of Aunt Becca, or simply Rebecca. (Note: Lincoln was friendly with the publisher of the paper at the time.) At the time, there was great controversy over the use of paper money, or that of gold and silver for the paying of public debts. The Illinois State Bank had been forced to close, and Shields as state auditor had become the target of resentment among members of the Whig Party, and more so given the upcoming 1842 elections. Lincoln's future wife and then fiancée, Mary Todd, helped to revise the letter, and she and a close friend Julia Jayne, (Note: Jayne would later marry Lyman Trumbull.) continued writing to the paper without Lincoln's knowledge.

"Rebecca" as she was, denounced Shields in the paper as a "fool as well as a liar," and scandalously described him at a party among a group of women:

If I was deaf and blind I could tell him by the smell ... All the galls about town were there, and all the handsome widows, and married women, finickin about, trying to look like galls, tied as tight in the middle, and puffed out at both ends like bundles of fodder that hadn't been stacked yet, wanted stackin pretty bad ... He was paying his money to this one and that one and tother one, and sufferin great loss because it wasn' silver instead of State paper ... [quoting Shields] "Dear girls, it is distressing, but I cannot marry you all. Too well I know how much you suffer, but do, do remember, it is not my fault that I am so handsome and so interesting." (Note: Emphasis in original.) (Note: "State paper" here refers to the state issued currency, which was in turmoil at the time, and of uncertain value. It had been decided, in part by Shields as state auditor, that only gold and silver would be accepted for the payment of taxes, and this was unpopular, as the average citizen had "almost no gold or silver".)

The publications caused "intense excitement" in Springfield, and Shields, taking great offense at being publicly ridiculed, demanded satisfaction, as well as the true identity of the author, then known only to the editor of the paper. Lincoln took responsibility for the articles and accepted the challenge. Shields confronted Lincoln, demanded a full retraction, and the incident escalated to the two men picking seconds, and meeting on an island located between Missouri and Illinois called Bloody Island to participate in a duel. (Note: It was unclear at the time whether the island in the Mississippi River, was legally in Illinois (where dueling was outlawed) or Missouri (were dueling was permitted). Although at least one source disputes this, saying they instead met on the banks of the Missouri side of the river, across from Alton, Illinois.) Lincoln, as the one challenged, chose the weapons for the duel, and selected the cavalry broadsword, as Shields was an excellent marksman, and because Lincoln stood 6 feet 4 inches (1.93 m) to Shields's 5 feet 9 inches (1.75 m).

At least two accounts have John J. Hardin and R. W. English intervening and convincing the two to cease hostilities. Others have them resolving their differences without incident, whether through threats on the part of Lincoln, or through apology and explanation from him. However, all accounts agree that they left the island without following through with the duel. Thereafter, Shields and Lincoln became and remained good friends. (Note: According to one account, Lincoln seldom spoke of the duel, saying only that he was willing to forget the matter. When asked later by Willian Herndon, Herndon recorded his response as simply "'If all good things I have ever done,' [Lincoln] said regretfully, 'are remembered as long and as well as my scrape with Shields, it is plain I shall not be forgotten.'" Another has Mary Todd writing many years later saying, "After the reconciliation between the contending parties, [Lincoln] & myself mutually agreed, never to refer to it & except in an occasional light manner, between us, it was never mentioned.")

=== Subsequent career ===
Shields was appointed as an Illinois Supreme Court justice on February 18, 1845, to take the seat vacated by Stephen A. Douglas. (Note: Douglas had been elected to the U.S. House of Representatives.) His term was relatively unremarkable, and he soon resigned to become Commissioner of the U.S. General Land Office. While at the Land Office, Shields spent much effort boring, testing, surveying and examining land in Iowa, as he planned to establish a colony for Irish immigrants there. He resigned from the position to assume command as a brigadier general following the outbreak of the Mexican–American War.

== Mexican–American War ==
On July 1, 1846, Shields was commissioned a brigadier general of volunteers to fight in the Mexican–American War. He served under Zachary Taylor, then also a brigadier general, and later under Brigadier General John E. Wool and Major General Winfield Scott.

In 1846, Shields left for war with two brigades under his command. In February 1847, when Tampico was abandoned, his men assumed control of the city. He commanded the 3rd Brigade, Volunteer Division, at the battles of Vera Cruz and Cerro Gordo, where he was severely wounded by grapeshot, and spent nine weeks recuperating. (Note: According to the Catholic Encyclopedia, he was shot through the lung. According to the Illinois State Historical Society he was shot through the lung and the 1.5 inches (38 mm) shot exited near his spine. Others fail to mention the type of injury, but say simply that it was thought to be a mortal wound, and that Shields's life was reportedly saved by either a Mexican surgeon, a French surgeon who had been captured by the Mexicans, or an Irish physician who had served in both the French and Mexican armies, and who was a prisoner of war.) He returned to fight in a single day, at both the battles of Contreras and Churubusco. His command that day was criticized as clumsy by some, and praised as skillful by others. He required reinforcements to overcome strong enemy resistance, but his brigade took over 800 prisoners.

Shields was again wounded, receiving a fractured arm in the Battle of Chapultepec, after his horse was shot out from underneath him, and he continued fighting on foot, and leading his troops with sword. He remained on the field until the conclusion of the battle, but was then forced to spend several months recuperating, where he remained until after the final battles of the war.

Shields returned to America, where he was mustered out and his brigade disbanded on July 28, 1848. Shields returned to his law practice in Illinois. He was brevetted to major general, and received two honorary swords from the states South Carolina and Illinois. (Note: These swords were reportedly worth $5,000 and $3,000 respectively.)

== Senator from Illinois ==
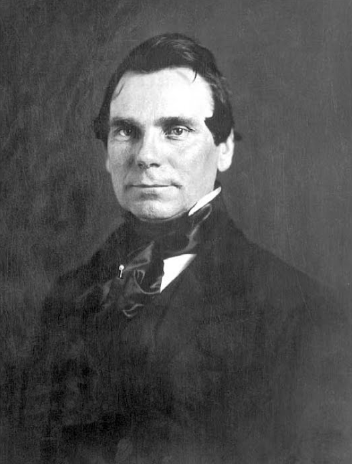
Daguerreotype of Shields c. 1849–1855

Following the war, on August 14, 1848, he was nominated by President Polk, and confirmed by the United States Senate to serve as governor of Oregon Territory, which had been created that same day. However, he declined the position and Joseph Lane was nominated and became the first governor of the new territory.

Shields declined the governorship to run for the Senate from Illinois. He won, but the election was voided by on the grounds that he had not been a U.S. citizen for the nine years required by the United States Constitution; having been naturalized October 21, 1840, and elected on January 13, 1849. He therefore resigned from the Senate on March 14, returned to Illinois, campaigned once again for the seat he had resigned, and won a special election held by the governor in December (after nine years had passed), in order to replace himself as senator.

As senator, he opposed slavery, and supported land grants to agricultural colleges, to railroads, to soldiers, and to settlers under a homestead act.

Shields published the 1854 book, A History of Illinois, from its Commencement as a State in 1818 to 1847, originally written by Illinois Governor Thomas Ford. According to the foreword by Shields, Ford gave him the manuscript on his death bed, so that Shields might publish it, and use the proceeds to benefit Ford's then orphaned children. In 1854, a military company in Chicago was named "The Shields Guards" in his honor. The Guards would come to make up companies I and K in the 23rd Illinois Volunteer Infantry Regiment.

== Senator from Minnesota ==
In 1855, Shields was defeated for re-election in Illinois in a three way runoff between himself, Lincoln, and Lyman Trumbull, with Trumbull eventually winning the seat after several ballots. Shields then moved to Minnesota, to inspect lands he had been awarded there in return for his military service. He arranged for Irish immigrants to move from the East Coast to Minnesota, settling in Rice and Le Sueur counties. Shields himself founded Shieldsville, Minnesota, and was also involved in the early settlement of Faribault, Minnesota. In 1857, Native Americans massacred settlers in Spirit Lake, Iowa. Shields led a group of about 100 people from Minnesota to fight the tribes; however, by the time he arrived, the tribes had been beaten by troops under the control of Judson Bishop.

When Minnesota achieved statehood in 1858, and the legislature convened in December, Shields was put forward as a compromise candidate for U.S. Senator along with Henry Mower Rice. The two drew straws to determine who would serve out the longer and shorter terms. (Note: See also Classes of United States senators) Shields drew the short straw and thus served until only March 1859, losing his 1859 re-election bid to Morton S. Wilkinson.

== American Civil War ==
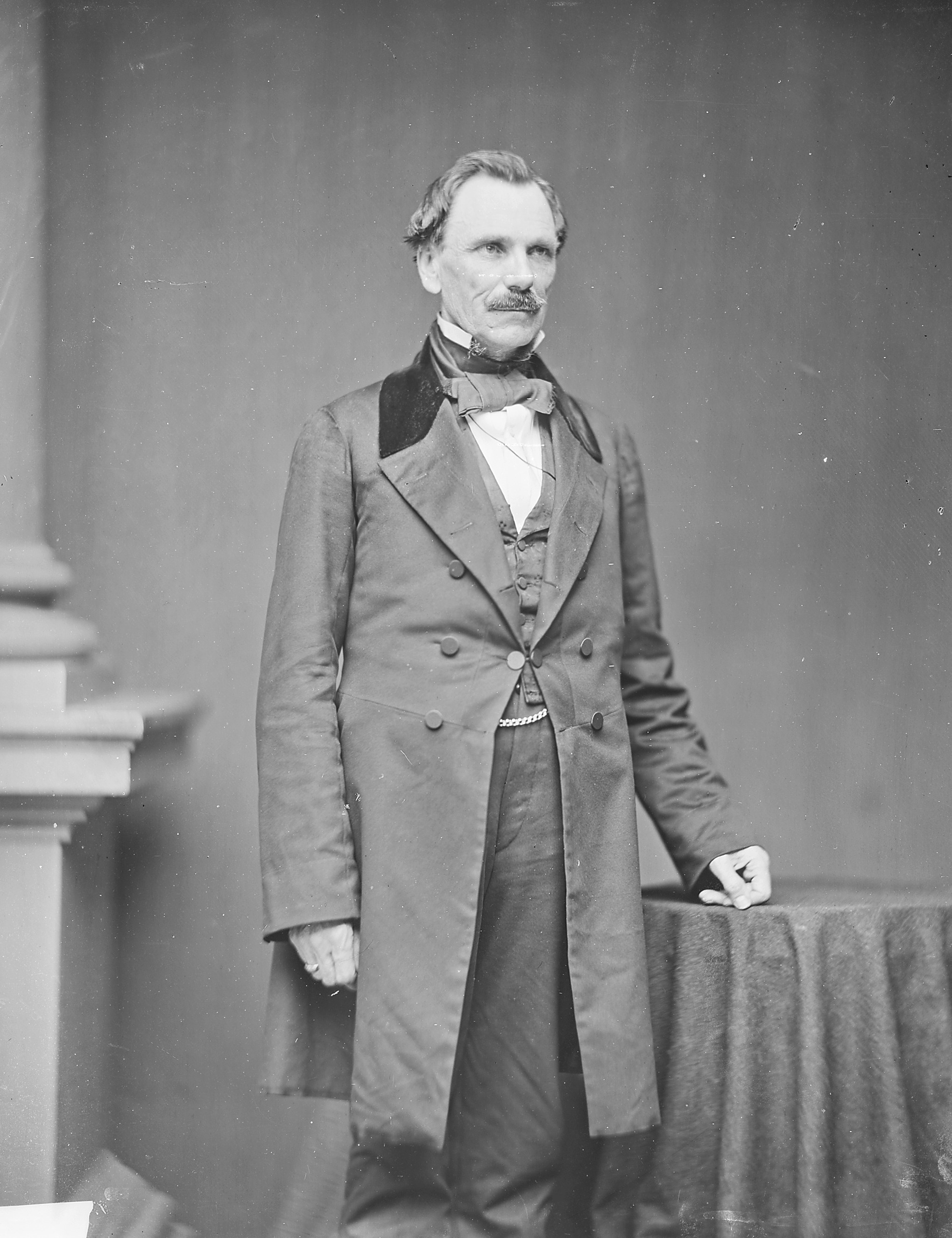
Photograph by Mathew Brady c. 1861–1865

Shields then moved to California, and married Mary Carr in 1861. He was engaged in a mining venture in Mexico, and it was there that Shields was when he was appointed as brigadier general of volunteers from that state following the outbreak of the American Civil War, succeeding the late Frederick W. Lander. He commanded the 2nd Division of the V Corps, Army of the Potomac (subsequently part of the Army of the Shenandoah), during the Valley Campaign of 1862.

Shields was wounded at the Battle of Kernstown on March 23, 1862, but his troops inflicted the only tactical defeat of General Thomas J. "Stonewall" Jackson during the campaign (or the war). The day after Kernstown, he was promoted to major general, but the promotion was withdrawn, reconsidered, and then finally rejected. Largely a result of his promotion being rejected, Shields resigned from the army. Shields was informally offered command of the Army of the Potomac by Abraham Lincoln. Shields declined owing to a poor relationship with Secretary of War Edwin Stanton.

== Senator from Missouri ==
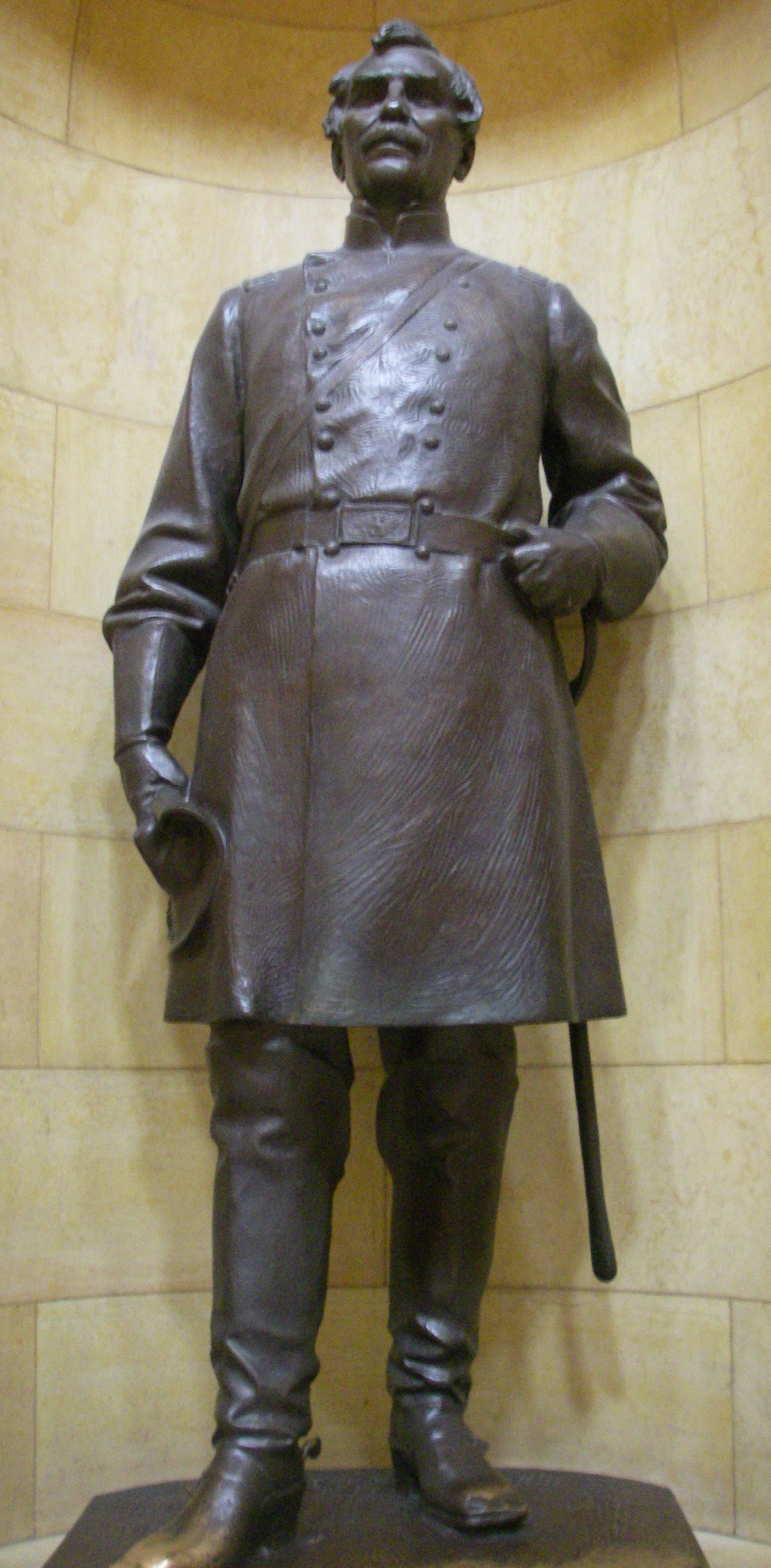
Statue of Shields in the Minnesota State Capitol, 2008

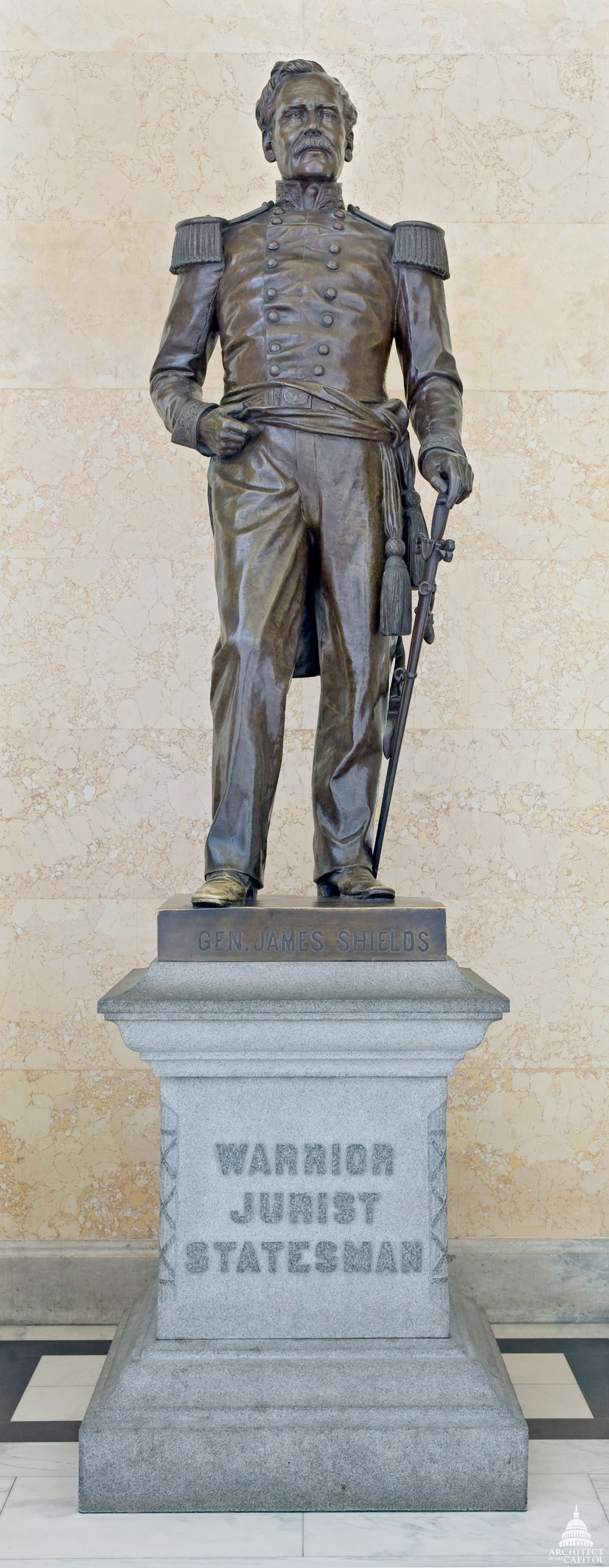
Statue of Shields in the United States Capitol, 2011

In 1863, Shields moved to San Francisco, where he would serve as the state railroad commissioner, and then to the Mississippi Valley, and to Wisconsin. In 1866 he settled in Carrollton, Missouri, which remained his home, and where he tended to his farm, lectured, and continued public involvement until his death 13 years later.

He ran for Congress unwillingly in 1868, and, in a contested election, lost. The result was disputed, and Congress awarded a year's salary to Shields. A member of Congress, Benjamin Butler, proposed him as Doorkeeper of the United States House of Representatives in 1876, but Shields, viewing it as an indignity, declined. Shields was involved in fundraising to provide aid to the yellow fever stricken Southern US. He served as member of the Missouri State House of Representatives, and as railroad commissioner was involved in establishing the State Railroad Commission. In 1879, he was elected to fill the seat left vacant by the death of Senator Lewis V. Bogy. He served only three months and declined to run for re-election, but this made Shields the only person to have ever served as senator from three different states.

== Death and legacy ==
Shields died unexpectedly in Ottumwa, Iowa, on June 1, 1879, while on a lecture tour, after reportedly complaining of chest pains. His body was transferred to Carrollton, Missouri by train, where a funeral was held at the local Catholic church, and his body escorted to St. Mary's Cemetery in Carrollton, Missouri by two companies of the Nineteenth Infantry, the Craig Rifles, and a twenty-piece brass band. His grave remained unmarked for 30 years, until the local government and the U.S. Congress funded a granite and bronze monument there in his honor.

Shields was not a wealthy man in later life, and upon his death the most valuable possessions he had to leave his family were his ceremonial swords, given to him following the end of the Mexican–American War. After his death, Mary Shields remained in Carrollton, with their daughter and two sons, until eventually moving to New York to live with their son Daniel.

A bronze statue of Shields was given by the State of Illinois in 1893, to the U.S. Capitol, and represents the state in the National Statuary Hall. The statue was sculpted by Leonard Volk, and dedicated in December 1893. A statue of Shields stands in front of the Carroll County Courthouse in Carrollton, Missouri. Dedicated on November 12, 1910, newspapers reported "hundreds of visitors from several states" that were present at the unveiling. Congress allocated $5,000 for the monument. A third statue stands on the grounds of the state capitol in Saint Paul, Minnesota, dedicated in 1914.

Derek Warfield wrote a song named The Ballad of General Shields about him.

== See also ==
- List of American Civil War generals (Union)
- List of duels
- List of sculptures in the National Statuary Hall Collection
- List of United States senators born outside the United States
- List of members of the United States Congress from multiple states

== Notes ==
Political offices
Preceded by Levi Davis	Auditor of Illinois; 1841–1843	Succeeded by William Lee D. Ewing
Government offices
Preceded by Thomas H. Blake	Commissioner of the General Land Office; 1845–1847	Succeeded by Richard M. Young
U.S. Senate
Preceded by Sidney Breese	U.S. Senator (Class 3) from Illinois; 1849; Served alongside: Stephen A. Douglas	Vacant Title next held by Himself
Vacant Title last held by Himself	U.S. Senator (Class 3) from Illinois; 1849–1855; Served alongside: Stephen A. Douglas	Succeeded by Lyman Trumbull
Preceded by Jefferson Davis	Chair of the Senate Military Affairs Committee; 1851–1855	Succeeded by John B. Weller
New seat	U.S. Shadow Senator (Class 2) from the Minnesota Territory; 1857–1858	Succeeded by Himself as U.S. Senator
Preceded by Himself as Shadow Senator	U.S. Senator (Class 2) from Minnesota; 1858–1859; Served alongside: Henry Mower Rice	Succeeded by Morton S. Wilkinson
Preceded by David H. Armstrong	U.S. Senator (Class 2) from Missouri; 1879; Served alongside: Francis Cockrell	Succeeded by George Graham Vest
