= Statue of James Shields (U.S. Capitol) =

Statue by Leonard Volk

James Shields
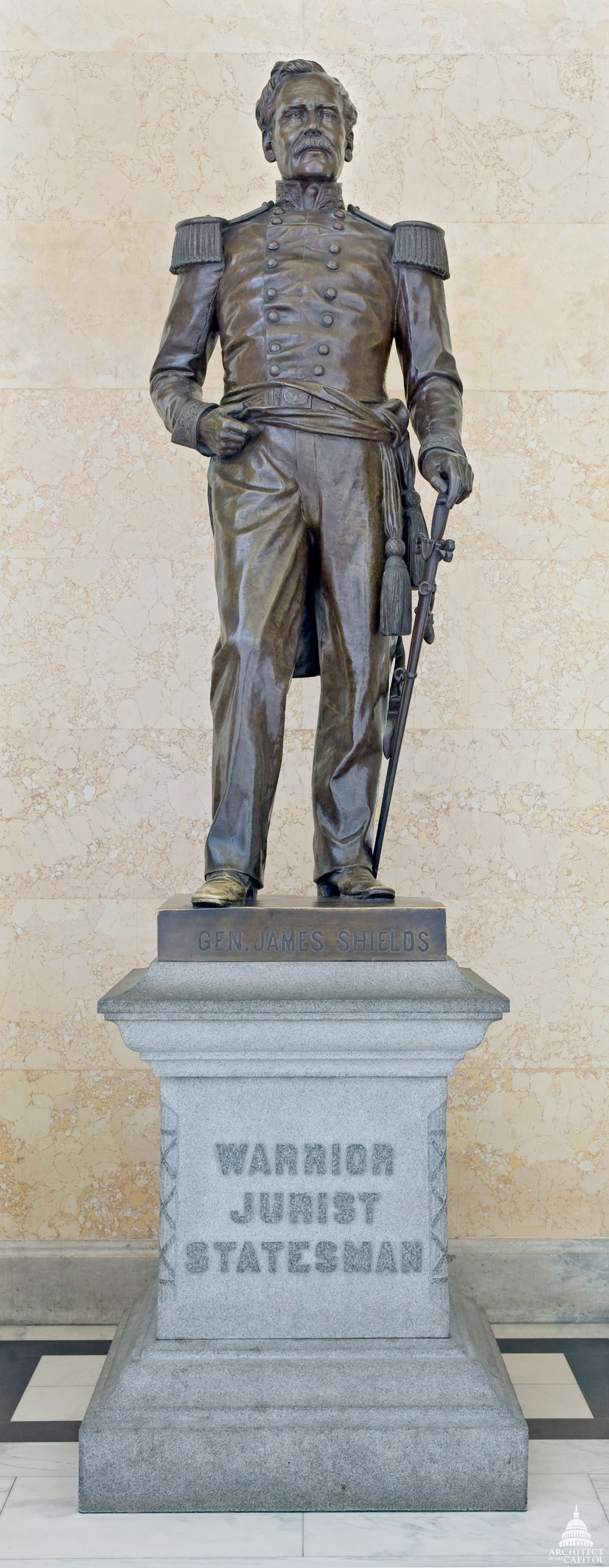
- Artist: Leonard Volk
- Medium: Bronze sculpture
- Subject: James Shields

James Shields is an 1893 bronze sculpture of James Shields by Leonard Volk, installed in the United States Capitol, in Washington, D.C., as part of the National Statuary Hall Collection. It is one of two statues donated by the state of Illinois. The sculpture was unveiled by Senator Shelby Moore Cullom of Illinois on December 6, 1893.

== See also ==
- 1893 in art
