= Joe Don McGaugh =

American politician from Missouri

Member of the Missouri House of Representatives from the 39th district
- In office 2013 – October 19, 2017
- Succeeded by: Peggy McGaugh

Personal details
- Born: November 29, 1983 (age 42) Carrollton, Missouri
- Party: Republican
- Spouse: Kassie
- Children: three
- Parent: Peggy McGaugh (mother)
- Profession: Attorney and Small Business Owner

Joe Don McGaugh (born November 29, 1983) is an American politician. He is a former member of the Missouri House of Representatives, having served from 2013 to 2017. He is a member of the Republican Party.
