= United States Post Office (Carrollton, Missouri) =

- U.S. Post Office
- U.S. National Register of Historic Places
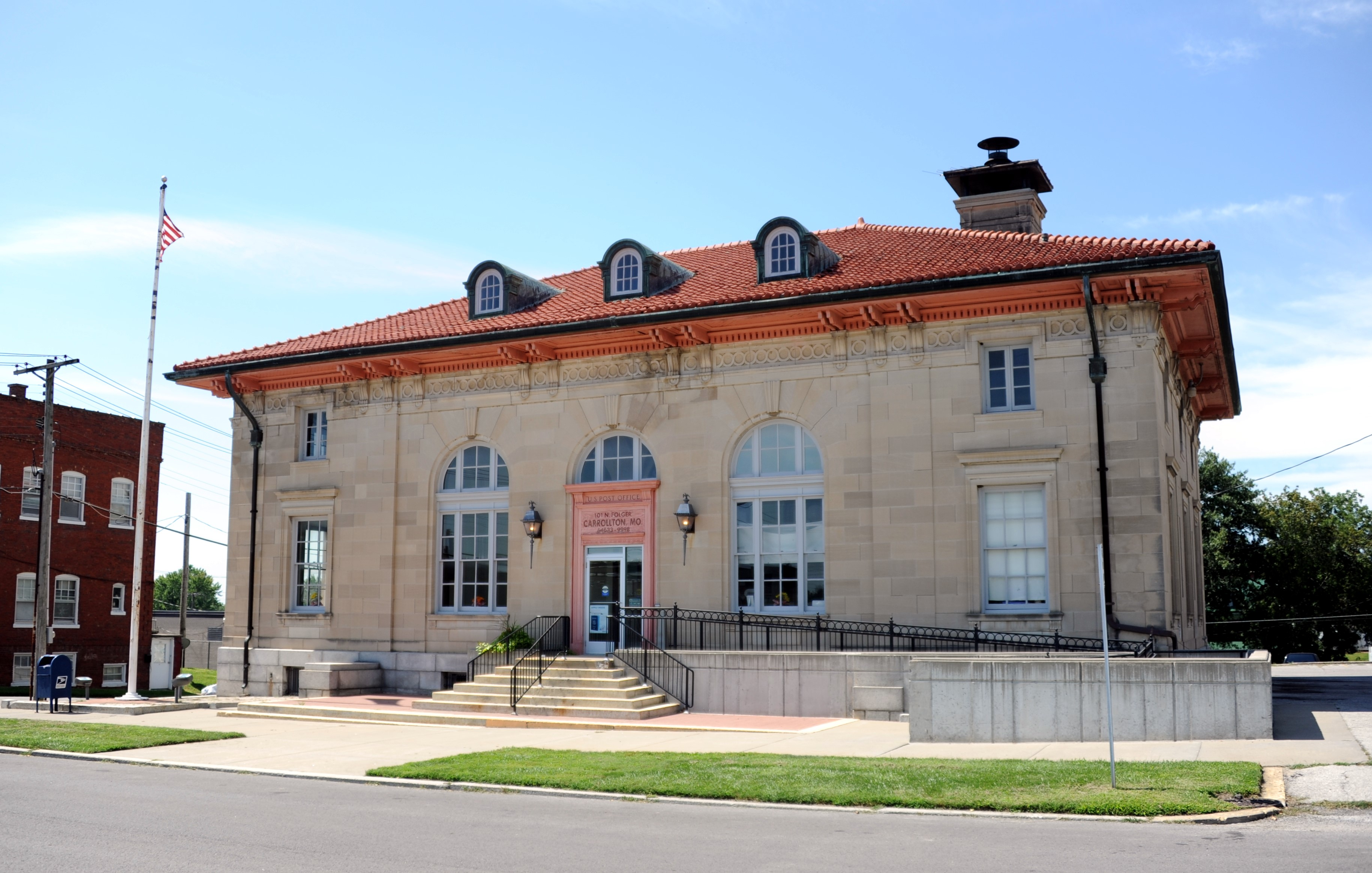

- Location within Missouri Location within the United States
- Interactive map showing the location of U.S. Post Office, Carrollton, Missouri
- Location: 101 N. Folger St. Carrollton, Missouri
- Coordinates: 39°21′22″N 93°29′31″W
- Area: less than one acre
- Built: 1910-1912
- Architect: James Knox Taylor
- Architectural style: Renaissance
- NRHP reference No.: 77001570
- Added to NRHP: May 12, 1977

U.S. Post Office is a historic post office building located at Carrollton, Carroll County, Missouri. It was designed by the Office of the Supervising Architect under James Knox Taylor and built between 1910 and 1912. It is a two-story, rectangular, Renaissance Revival style building constructed of regular coursed, smooth cut, Missouri limestone. It has a low hipped roof of red tile and features two large round arched windows flanking the main entrance.

It was listed on the National Register of Historic Places in 1977.
