= Norton Bush =

American painter (1834–1894)

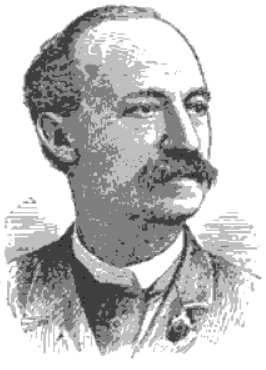
- Born: February 22, 1834; Rochester, New York, U.S.
- Died: April 24, 1894 (aged 60); Oakland, California, U.S.
- Occupation: Painter

Norton Bush (February 22, 1834 – April 24, 1894) was an American landscape painter. He did landscape paintings of California, Panama, Nicaragua, Peru and Ecuador, with a focus on Luminism.

== Early life ==
Norton Bush was born on February 22, 1834, in Rochester, New York. He learned landscape painting from William Harris in Rochester and Jasper Francis Cropsey of the Hudson River School in New York City. He was also mentored by Frederic Edwin Church, who suggested he paint the landscapes of South America. In 1853, Bush emigrated to California via Nicaragua.

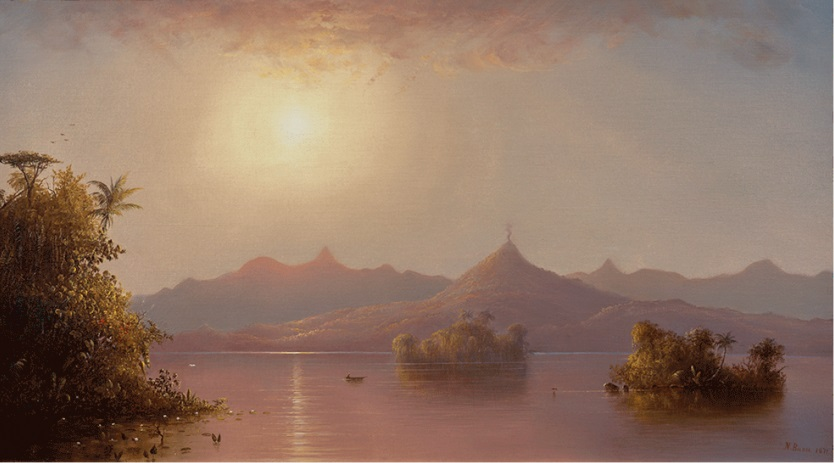
On the San Juan, Nicaragua (1871)

== Career ==
Bush became a professional landscape painter in San Francisco, California, initially on a part-time basis, until he opened a studio in the 1860s. His Mount Diablo gave him name recognition after it was purchased by Willard Brigham Farwell, the president of the Society of California Pioneers.

Bush did landscape paintings of the Sierra Nevada, Lake Tahoe and New England. However, most of his work consisted of landscape paintings of Central and South America, with a focus on Luminism. Bush was hired by William Chapman Ralston to paint the landscapes of Panama, including the Chagres River. He was subsequently hired by Edwin B. Crocker to do landscape paintings of Nicaragua. Crocker later donated them to the Crocker Art Museum. Bush was also hired by Henry Meiggs to do landscape paintings of Peru. His paintings were also purchased by the likes of Leland Stanford and James Clair Flood. He also did landscape paintings of Ecuador.

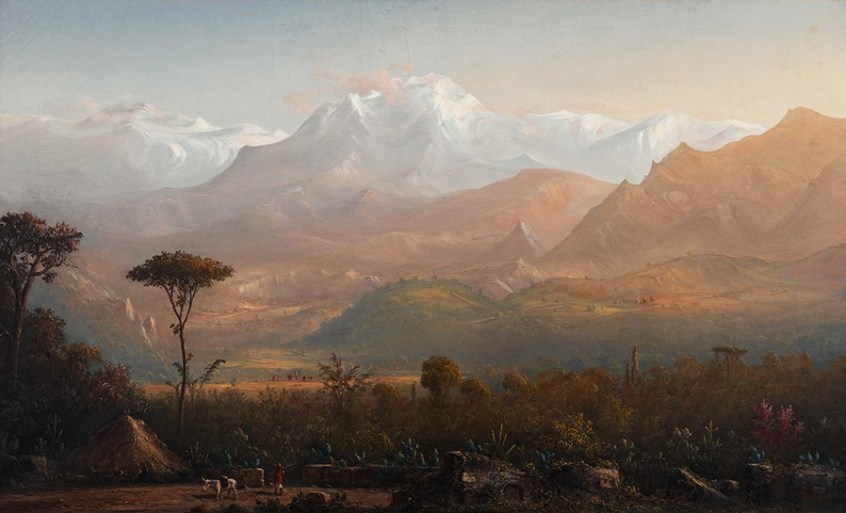
The Heart of the Peruvian Andes—A View from the Arequipa Valley with Mount Chachani in the Distance (1877)

Bush was a member of the California Art Association, and the director of the San Francisco Art Association from 1878 to 1880. His work was exhibited at the World's Columbian Exposition. He won the gold medal at the California State Fair multiple times.

== Personal life and death ==
Bush resided in San Francisco, California, and he was a member of the Bohemian Club.

Bush died of complications from a cold he caught in Chicago on April 24, 1894, at the Fabiola Hospital in Oakland, California. His funeral was held at the Unitarian Church in San Francisco.
