= Carroll County Sheriff's Quarters and Jail =

- U.S. National Register of Historic Places
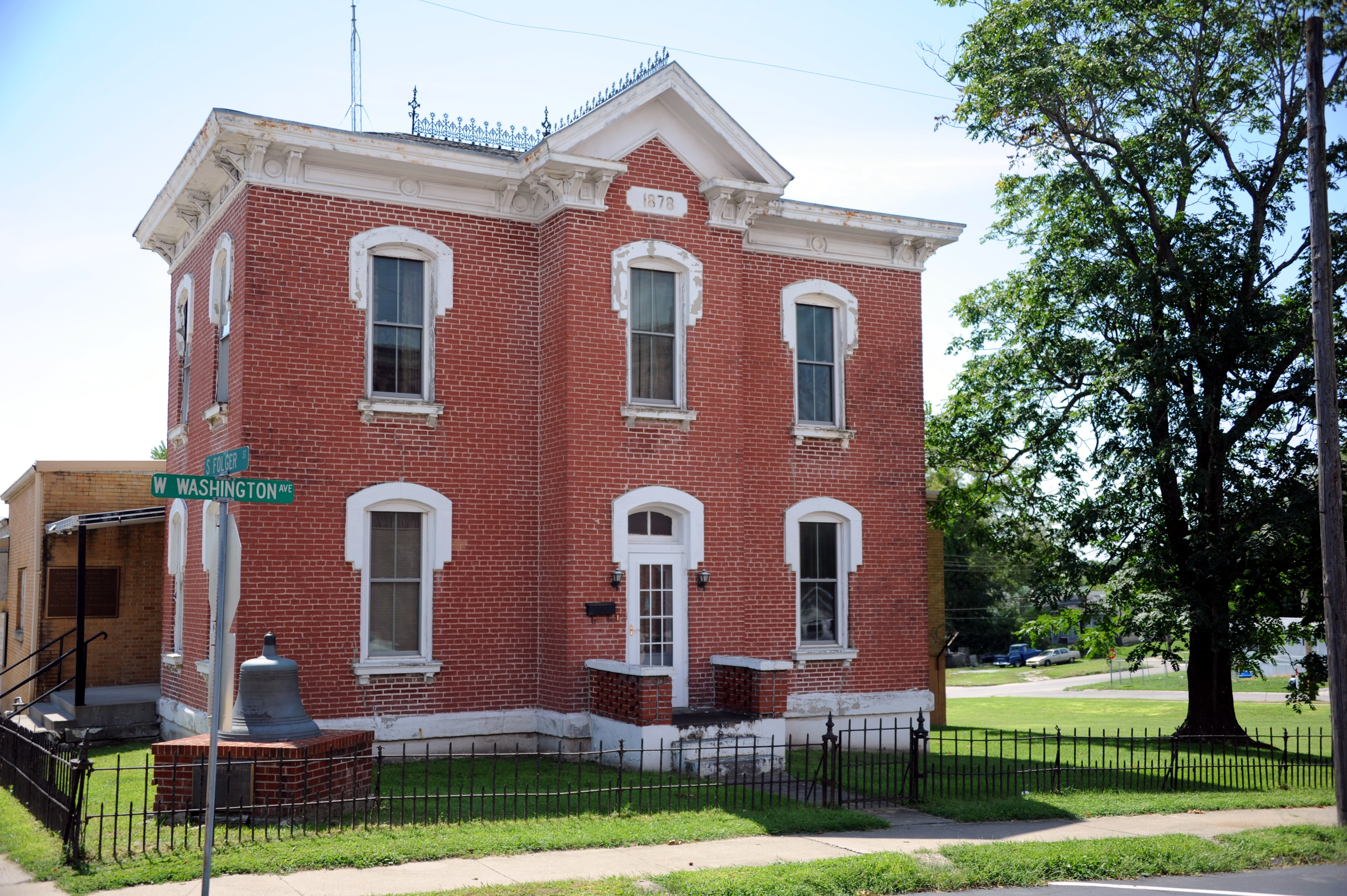

- Location within Missouri Location within the United States
- Location: 101 W. Washington St. Carrollton, Missouri
- Coordinates: 39°21′27″N 93°29′48″W
- Area: less than one acre
- Built: 1878
- Built by: Averill, G.P.
- Architect: Pauley, P.J., & Bros.
- Architectural style: Classical Revival
- NRHP reference No.: 79001355
- Added to NRHP: October 11, 1979

Carroll County Sheriff's Quarters and Jail is a historic combined sheriffs residence and jail located in Carrollton, Carroll County, Missouri. It was built in 1878 and consists of the two-story brick residence with an attached jail, constructed in 1958 to replace the original jail, which had collapsed. The residence is a Classical Revival-style brick building topped by a hipped roof.

It was listed on the National Register of Historic Places in 1979.
