= Levi Davis (politician) =

American politician and lawyer

Levi Davis, Sr. (July 20, 1808 – March 3, 1897) was an American politician and lawyer.

Born in Cecil County, Maryland, Davis was admitted to the Maryland bar. He moved to Vandalia, Illinois. He fought in the Black Hawk War of 1832. Davis was involved with the Whig Party and later with the Republican Party. From 1835 to 1841, Davis served as the Auditor of Public Accounts, State of Illinois. He then continued to practice law. In 1846, Davis moved to Alton, Illinois and continued to practice law. He was the attorney for the Chicago and Alton Railroad. His three sons—James, Dr. Charles, and Levi Jr. -- enlisted and served in the 97th Illinois Volunteer Regiment during the Civil War, fighting during the Vicksburg campaign. Davis died as a result of a stroke at his son's house in Alton, Illinois.
