= Carrollton, Missouri =

- City
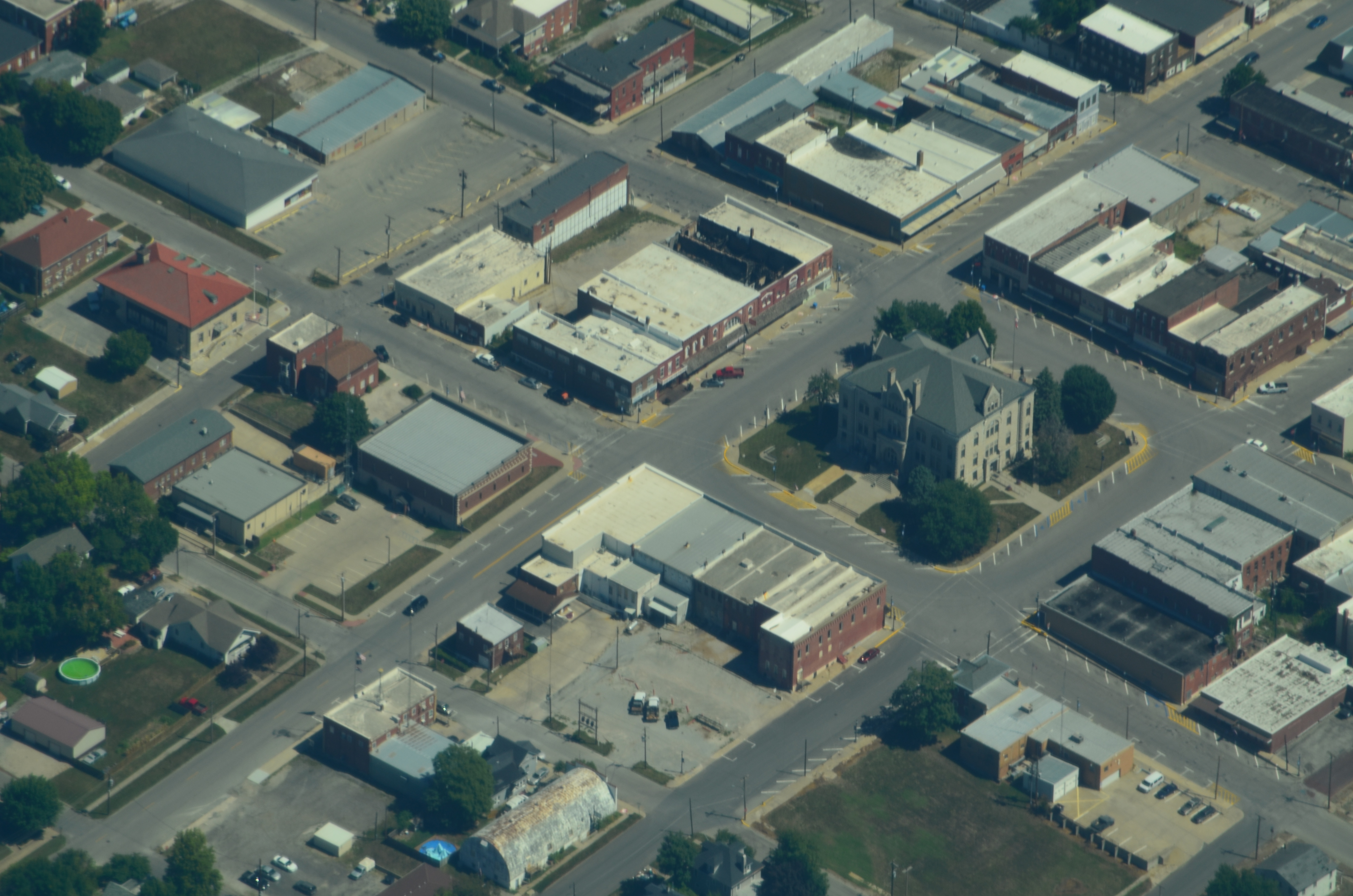
- Aerial view of Carrollton, Missouri

- Location of Carrollton, Missouri
- Coordinates: 39°21′49″N 93°29′44″W
- Country: United States
- State: Missouri
- County: Carroll
- Incorporated: 1833

Government
  - Type: Mayor-council
  - Mayor: Frank Olvera

Area
  - Total: 4.19 sq mi (10.84 km^{2})
  - Land: 4.17 sq mi (10.80 km^{2})
  - Water: 0.015 sq mi (0.04 km^{2})
- Elevation: 748 ft (228 m)

Population (2020)
  - Total: 3,514
  - Density: 843.0/sq mi (325.49/km^{2})
- Time zone: UTC-6 (Central (CST))
  - Summer (DST): UTC-5 (CDT)
- ZIP code: 64633
- Area code: 660
- FIPS code: 29-11566
- GNIS feature ID: 2393754
- Website: www.carrolltonmo.org

Carrollton is a city and the county seat of Carroll County, Missouri, United States. Carrollton won the 2005 All-America City Award, given out annually by the National Civic League. The population was 3,514 at the 2020 census.

== History ==
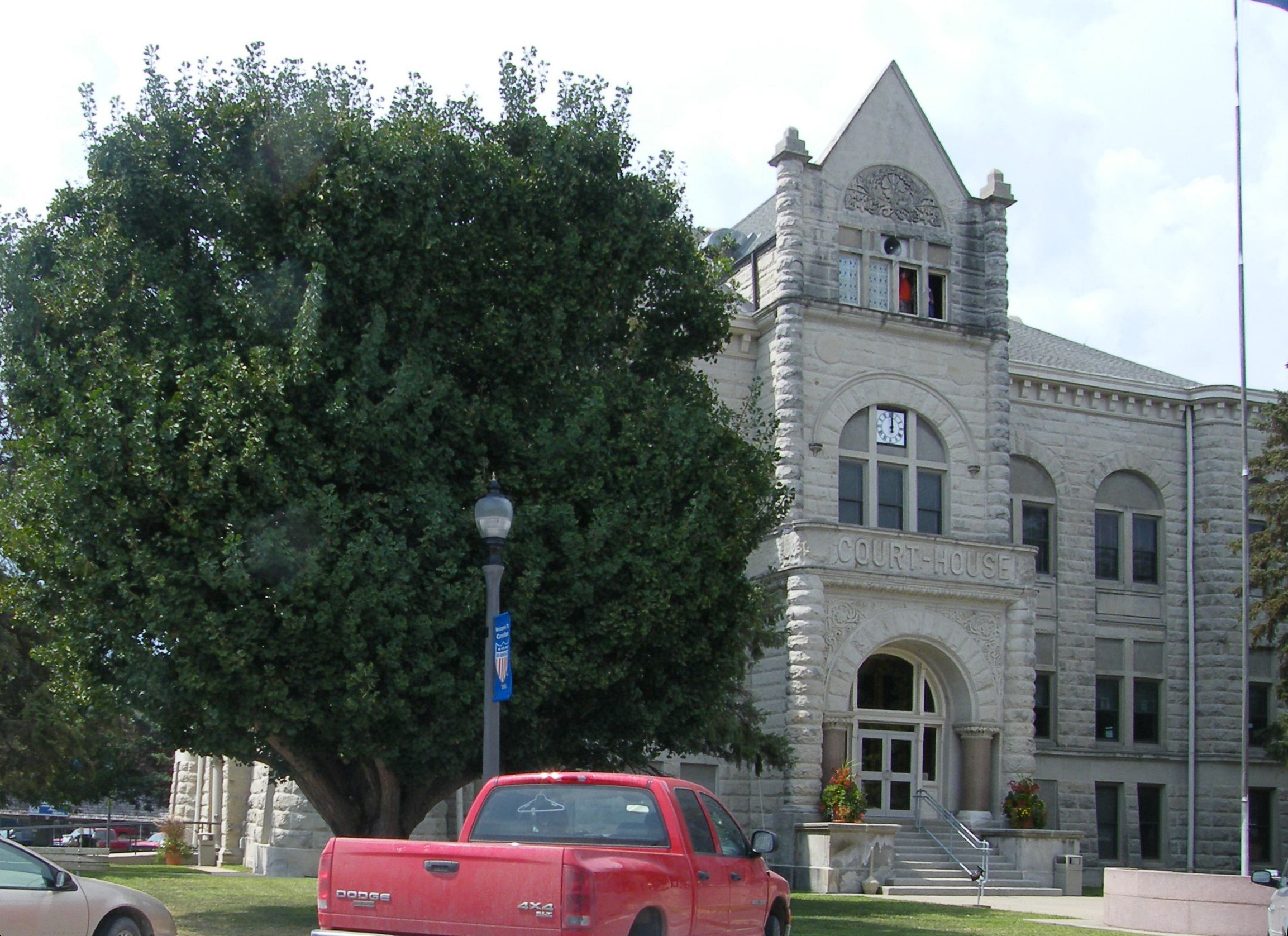
Carroll County Courthouse

Carrollton was established in 1833. It obtained its post office in 1834. Carrollton's growth can be documented through Sanborn maps, several of which are available online.

The Carroll County Court House, Carroll County Sheriff's Quarters and Jail, United States Post Office, and Wilcoxson and Company Bank are listed on the National Register of Historic Places.

== Geography ==
Carrollton is located in south central Carroll County at the intersection of US routes 24 and US Route 65. The Missouri River is five miles south of the city.

According to the United States Census Bureau, the city has a total area of 4.19 square miles (10.85 km^{2}), of which 4.17 square miles (10.80 km^{2}) is land and 0.02 square miles (0.05 km^{2}) is water.

=== Climate ===
Climate data for Carrollton, Missouri (1991–2020 normals, extremes 1893–present)
Month	Jan	Feb	Mar	Apr	May	Jun	Jul	Aug	Sep	Oct	Nov	Dec	Year
Record high °F (°C)	74 (23)	80 (27)	87 (31)	93 (34)	98 (37)	105 (41)	114 (46)	108 (42)	105 (41)	94 (34)	81 (27)	73 (23)	114 (46)
Mean daily maximum °F (°C)	37.2 (2.9)	42.6 (5.9)	54.5 (12.5)	65.7 (18.7)	75.3 (24.1)	84.3 (29.1)	88.0 (31.1)	86.7 (30.4)	79.8 (26.6)	67.8 (19.9)	53.6 (12.0)	41.8 (5.4)	64.8 (18.2)
Daily mean °F (°C)	27.3 (−2.6)	31.9 (−0.1)	42.7 (5.9)	53.5 (11.9)	64.1 (17.8)	73.6 (23.1)	77.5 (25.3)	75.7 (24.3)	67.7 (19.8)	55.6 (13.1)	42.7 (5.9)	32.1 (0.1)	53.7 (12.1)
Mean daily minimum °F (°C)	17.4 (−8.1)	21.1 (−6.1)	31.0 (−0.6)	41.3 (5.2)	52.9 (11.6)	62.9 (17.2)	67.0 (19.4)	64.7 (18.2)	55.5 (13.1)	43.4 (6.3)	31.8 (−0.1)	22.5 (−5.3)	42.6 (5.9)
Record low °F (°C)	−23 (−31)	−34 (−37)	−16 (−27)	14 (−10)	28 (−2)	41 (5)	47 (8)	42 (6)	28 (−2)	17 (−8)	−5 (−21)	−24 (−31)	−34 (−37)
Average precipitation inches (mm)	1.41 (36)	1.85 (47)	2.51 (64)	3.92 (100)	5.13 (130)	5.37 (136)	4.27 (108)	4.39 (112)	4.28 (109)	3.16 (80)	2.21 (56)	1.58 (40)	40.08 (1,018)
Average snowfall inches (cm)	4.8 (12)	3.3 (8.4)	1.1 (2.8)	0.2 (0.51)	0.0 (0.0)	0.0 (0.0)	0.0 (0.0)	0.0 (0.0)	0.0 (0.0)	0.3 (0.76)	0.9 (2.3)	2.1 (5.3)	12.7 (32)
Average precipitation days (≥ 0.01 in)	5.6	5.5	8.6	10.5	12.1	10.1	8.4	8.3	7.5	8.6	6.5	5.6	97.3
Average snowy days (≥ 0.1 in)	2.3	1.8	0.6	0.1	0.0	0.0	0.0	0.0	0.0	0.1	0.4	1.9	7.2
Source: NOAA

== Demographics ==
Historical population
Census	Pop.	Note	%±
1860	738		—
1870	1,832		148.2%
1880	2,313		26.3%
1890	3,878		67.7%
1900	3,854		−0.6%
1910	3,452		−10.4%
1920	3,218		−6.8%
1930	4,058		26.1%
1940	4,070		0.3%
1950	4,380		7.6%
1960	4,554		4.0%
1970	4,847		6.4%
1980	4,700		−3.0%
1990	4,406		−6.3%
2000	4,122		−6.4%
2010	3,784		−8.2%
2020	3,514		−7.1%
U.S. Decennial Census

=== 2020 census ===
As of the 2020 census, Carrollton had a population of 3,514. The median age was 42.9 years. 21.9% of residents were under the age of 18 and 23.6% of residents were 65 years of age or older. For every 100 females there were 88.2 males, and for every 100 females age 18 and over there were 85.0 males age 18 and over.

0.0% of residents lived in urban areas, while 100.0% lived in rural areas.

There were 1,493 households in Carrollton, of which 27.3% had children under the age of 18 living in them. Of all households, 42.5% were married-couple households, 18.9% were households with a male householder and no spouse or partner present, and 31.7% were households with a female householder and no spouse or partner present. About 35.0% of all households were made up of individuals and 19.2% had someone living alone who was 65 years of age or older.

There were 1,825 housing units, of which 18.2% were vacant. The homeowner vacancy rate was 4.8% and the rental vacancy rate was 14.7%.

Racial composition as of the 2020 census
Race	Number	Percent
White	3,221	91.7%
Black or African American	54	1.5%
American Indian and Alaska Native	4	0.1%
Asian	12	0.3%
Native Hawaiian and Other Pacific Islander	0	0.0%
Some other race	31	0.9%
Two or more races	192	5.5%
Hispanic or Latino (of any race)	74	2.1%

== Education ==
Carrollton R-VII School District, which covers the municipality, operates Carrollton Area Career Center, Carrollton High School; grades 9–12, Carrollton Junior High School; grades 7–8, and Carrollton Elementary School; grades Pre-1 and 2–6.

The town has a lending library, the Carrollton Public Library.

== Notable people ==
- Amanda Austin, painter and sculptor
- Bryan Andrews, country singer
- Leon E. Bates, UAW leader
- Roscoe P. Conkling, Justice of the Missouri Supreme Court
- James Johnson Duderstadt, President of the University of Michigan. 1988-1996
- James Fergason, graduated Carrollton High School in 1952. American inventor and business entrepreneur.
- Robert P. Foster, WWII U.S. Navy lieutenant commander, President of Northwest Missouri State University
- Francis Doyle Gleeson, Roman Catholic bishop
- John B. Hale, U.S. House Representative from Missouri, Civil War Colonel
- William Claude Jones, American politician, poet, and fabulist
- Ralph F. Lozier, U.S. House Representative from Missouri, circuit court judge of the 7th Judicial Circuit of Missouri
- Jack Marshall, Negro Leagues pitcher and manager
- Don Martin, NFL football player and coach
- Joe Don McGaugh, Missouri House Representative
- John C. McQueen, Major general, USMC; Decorated veteran of World War II
- William Rock Painter, 28th Lieutenant Governor of Missouri, and Missouri State Senator
- William E. Schreiber, American college football player and coach and athletic administrator
- William A. Shanklin, University President of Upper Iowa University and Wesleyan University
- James Shields, Civil War general and United States Senator
- Robert Simpson was an American hurdler and track and field coach.
- Claude T. Smith, American band conductor, composer, and educator.
- John H. Stringfellow, One of the founders of Atchison, Kansas, and speaker of the house in the first territorial legislature
- Jewell Wallace, TCU Football player and head coach of the University of Houston
