= William E. Schreiber =

American football player and coach (1880–1965)

William Schreiber
Biographical details
- Born: December 20, 1880; Carrollton, Missouri, U.S.
- Died: November 5, 1965 (aged 84); Mesa, Arizona, U.S.

Playing career

Football
- 1900–1901: Wisconsin

Basketball
- 1902–1904: Wisconsin

Coaching career (HC unless noted)

Football
- 1904–1908: Pratt
- 1909–1911: Oklahoma A&M (assistant)
- 1912–1917: Whitewater Normal

Basketball
- 1913–1917: Whitewater Normal

Administrative career (AD unless noted)
- ?–1918: Whitewater Normal
- 1918–1924: Montana

William Earle Schreiber (December 20, 1880 – November 5, 1965) was an American college football player and coach and athletic administrator. He served as the head football coach Whitewater Normal School—now known as the University of Wisconsin–Whitewater—from 1912 to 1917. Shreiber left to Whitewater Normal in 1918 to the director of physical ediucation at the University of Montana.
