= Peggy McGaugh =

American politician

Member of the Missouri House of Representatives from the 39th, 7th district
- Incumbent
- Assumed office February 26, 2018
- Preceded by: Joe Don McGaugh
- Succeeded by: Jeremy Clevenger (elect)

County Clerk, Carroll County, Missouri
- In office 1985–2018

Personal details
- Party: Republican
- Spouse: David
- Children: 2, including Joe Don

Peggy McGaugh is an American politician. She is a Republican representing District 7 in the Missouri House of Representatives.

== Political career ==
McGaugh was County Clerk in Carroll County, Missouri from 1985 to 2018.

In February 2018, McGaugh ran in a special election to replace her son, Joe Don McGaugh, as the District 39 representative in the Missouri House of Representatives. She defeated Democrat Ethan Perkinson with 35.7% of the vote. In November 2018, she won election to a full term, and was reelected to a second full term in 2020. Redistricting in 2022 placed her home in District 7 instead of 39, so she was reelected to a third term there.

As of June 2020, McGaugh sits on the following committees:

- Elections and Elected Officials
- Local Government

=== Electoral record ===
2018 special general election: Missouri House of Representatives, District 39
Party	Candidate	Votes	%
Republican	Peggy McGaugh	1,945	64.3%
Democratic	Ethan Perkinson	1,081	35.7%

2018 general election: Missouri House of Representatives, District 39
Party	Candidate	Votes	%
Republican	Peggy McGaugh	9,534	66.9%
Democratic	Rick Mellon	4,711	33.1%

Missouri House of Representatives Election, November 3, 2020, District 39
Party	Candidate	Votes	%	±%
Republican	Peggy McGaugh	15,328	100.00%	+33.1

Missouri House of Representatives Election, November 8, 2022, District 7
Party	Candidate	Votes	%	±%
Republican	Peggy McGaugh	10,862	80.76%	−19.24
Democratic	Joshua Vance	2,587	19.24%	+19.24
Total votes		13,449	100.00%	
