= Carroll County Court House (Missouri) =

- U.S. National Register of Historic Places
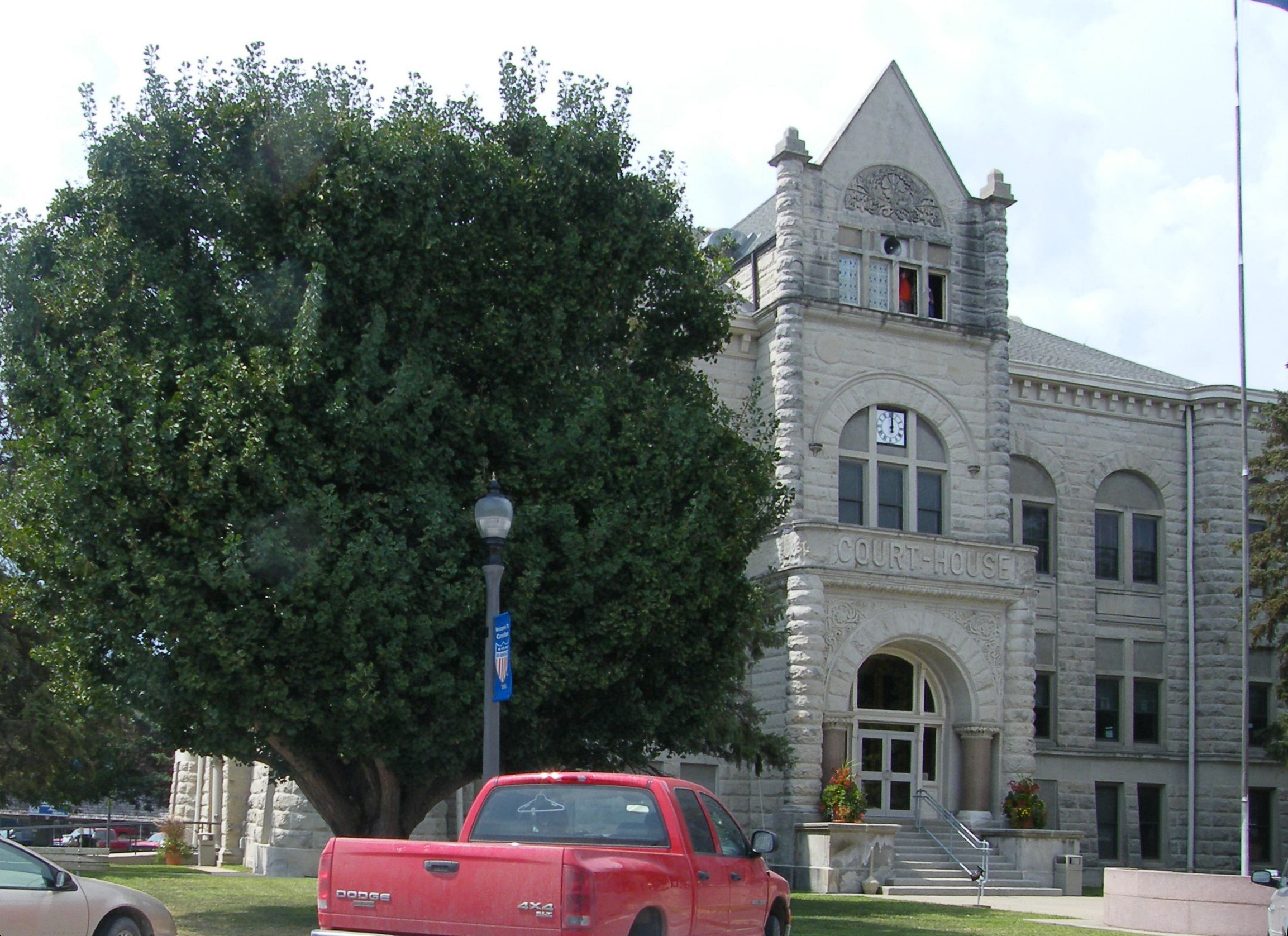
- Carroll County Court House, August 2010

- Location within Missouri Location within the United States
- Interactive map showing the location of Carroll County Court House
- Location: Courthouse Square, Carrollton, Missouri
- Coordinates: 39°21′29″N 93°29′47″W
- Area: less than one acre
- Built: 1904
- Architect: R. G. Kirsch; John Scott & Son
- Architectural style: Romanesque
- NRHP reference No.: 95000858
- Added to NRHP: July 21, 1995

Carroll County Court House is a historic courthouse located at Carrollton, Carroll County, Missouri. It was built in 1904, and is a 2 1/2 story, Romanesque Revival style building built of locally quarried coursed rough faced sandstone. Also on the property is the contributing heroic statue of General James Shields.

It was listed on the National Register of Historic Places in 1995.
