= Wilcoxson and Company Bank =

- U.S. National Register of Historic Places
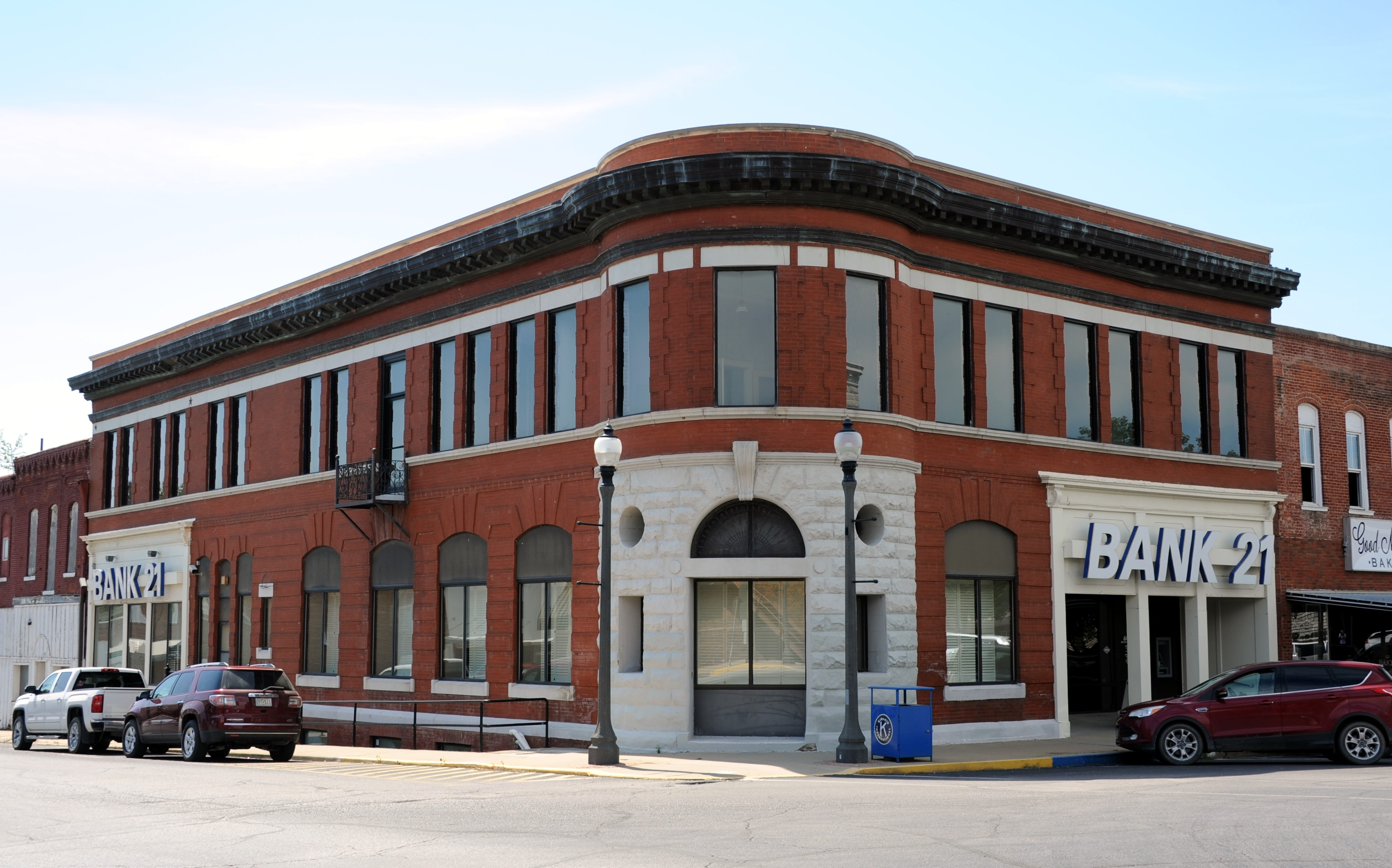

- Location within Missouri Location within the United States
- Location: 1 W. Washington Ave. Carrollton, Missouri
- Coordinates: 39°21′28″N 93°29′45″W
- Area: less than one acre
- Built: 1904
- NRHP reference No.: 83000975
- Added to NRHP: January 21, 1983

Wilcoxson and Company Bank, also known as the Farmer's Bank of Carrollton and Farmer's Bank of Bogard, is a historic bank building located at Carrollton, Carroll County, Missouri. It was built in 1904, and consists of two two-story buildings, a corner building and a building that wraps around it on two sides. The buildings are visually tied together by a denticulated projecting cornice and stone coping on the tall roof parapet.

It was listed on the National Register of Historic Places in 1983.
