= List of municipalities in the Kansas City metropolitan area =

This is a complete list of all incorporated municipalities within Kansas City metropolitan area as defined by the U.S. Census as of 2020. The Kansas City metropolitan area (MO-KS) population in 2018 was 2,106,632 and the Kansas City CSA in 2022 was 2,209,152.

== More than 500,000 ==
- Kansas City, Missouri – Pop: 508,090

== More than 100,000 ==
- Overland Park, Kansas – Pop: 197,238
- Kansas City, Kansas – Pop: 156,607
- Olathe, Kansas – Pop: 141,290
- Independence, Missouri – Pop: 123,011
- Lee's Summit, Missouri – Pop: 101,108

== 50,000–99,999 ==
- Shawnee, Kansas – Pop: 67,311
- Blue Springs, Missouri – Pop: 58,604
- Lenexa, Kansas – Pop: 57,434

== 20,000–49,999 ==
- Leavenworth, Kansas – Pop: 37,351
- Leawood, Kansas – Pop: 33,902
- Liberty, Missouri – Pop: 30,167
- Raytown, Missouri – Pop: 30,012
- Gladstone, Missouri – Pop: 27,063
- Grandview, Missouri – Pop: 26,209
- Belton, Missouri – Pop: 23,953
- Gardner, Kansas – Pop: 23,287
- Prairie Village, Kansas – Pop: 22,957
- Raymore, Missouri – Pop: 22,941

== 10,000–19,999 ==
- Grain Valley, Missouri – Pop: 15,627
- Ottawa, Kansas – Pop: 12,625
- Lansing, Kansas – Pop: 11,239
- Merriam, Kansas – Pop: 11,098
- Excelsior Springs, Missouri – Pop: 10,553
- Smithville, Missouri - Pop: 10,406
- Kearney, Missouri – Pop: 10,404
- Harrisonville, Missouri – Pop: 10,121

== 5,000–9,999 ==
- Mission, Kansas – Pop: 9,954
- Pleasant Hill, Missouri – Pop: 8,777
- Cameron, Missouri (partial) – Pop: 8,513
- Oak Grove, Missouri – Pop: 8,157
- Spring Hill, Kansas – Pop: 7,952
- Bonner Springs, Kansas – Pop: 7,837
- Parkville, Missouri – Pop: 7,177
- Basehor, Kansas – Pop: 6,896
- Roeland Park, Kansas – Pop: 6,871
- De Soto, Kansas – Pop: 6,118
- Richmond, Missouri – Pop: 6,013
- Paola, Kansas – Pop: 5,768
- Peculiar, Missouri – Pop: 5,621
- Odessa, Missouri – Pop: 5,593
- Tonganoxie, Kansas – Pop: 5,573
- Greenwood, Missouri – Pop: 5,221

== 500–4,999 ==
- Louisburg, Kansas – Pop: 4,969
- Higginsville, Missouri – Pop: 4,817
- Platte City, Missouri – Pop: 4,784
- Lexington, Missouri – Pop: 4,726
- Edwardsville, Kansas – Pop: 4,717
- North Kansas City, Missouri – Pop: 4,467
- Osawatomie, Kansas – Pop: 4,255
- Butler, Missouri – Pop: 4,220
- Fairway, Kansas – Pop: 4,170
- Riverside, Missouri – Pop: 4,013
- Mission Hills, Kansas – Pop: 3,594
- Sugar Creek, Missouri – Pop: 3,271
- Buckner, Missouri – Pop: 2,945
- Pleasant Valley, Missouri – Pop: 2,743
- Lawson, Missouri – Pop: 2,541
- Concordia, Missouri - Pop: 2,371
- Lake Lotawana, Missouri – Pop: 2,310
- Lathrop, Missouri - Pop: 2,271
- Plattsburg, Missouri – Pop: 2,222
- Weatherby Lake, Missouri – Pop: 2,077
- Wellsville, Kansas – Pop: 1,953
- Weston, Missouri - Pop: 1,756
- Westwood, Kansas – Pop: 1,750
- Edgerton, Kansas – Pop: 1,748
- Adrian, Missouri – Pop: 1,730
- Hamilton, Missouri - Pop: 1,690
- Garden City, Missouri – Pop: 1,579
- Gower, Missouri (partial) – Pop: 1,533
- Lone Jack, Missouri – Pop: 1,492
- Lake Winnebago, Missouri – Pop: 1,433
- Claycomo, Missouri – Pop: 1,343
- Archie, Missouri – Pop: 1,268
- Rich Hill, Missouri – Pop: 1,232
- Pleasanton, Kansas - Pop: 1,208
- La Cygne, Kansas - Pop: 1,050
- Lake Quivira, Kansas - Pop: 1,014
- Drexel, Missouri - Pop: 968
- Linn Valley, Kansas - Pop: 956
- Lake Waukomis, Missouri - Pop: 888
- Waverly, Missouri - Pop: 849
- Wellington, Missouri - Pop: 812
- Wood Heights, Missouri - Pop: 757
- Orrick, Missouri - Pop: 753
- Braymer, Missouri - Pop: 737
- Lake Tapawingo, Missouri - Pop: 730
- Cleveland, Missouri – Pop: 650
- Mound City, Kansas - Pop: 647
- Ferrelview, Missouri - Pop: 642
- Edgerton, Missouri - Pop: 601
- Trimble, Missouri - Pop: 573
- Hardin, Missouri - Pop: 571
- Glenaire, Missouri - Pop: 539
- Polo, Missouri - Pop: 509

== 200–499 ==
- Dearborn, Missouri (partial) – Pop: 482
- Freeman, Missouri - Pop: 475
- Holt, Missouri - Pop: 471
- Camden Point, Missouri - Pop: 457
- Avondale, Missouri - Pop: 436
- Corder, Missouri - Pop: 418
- Linwood, Kansas - Pop: 415
- Alma, Missouri - Pop: 400
- Westwood Hills, Kansas - Pop: 400
- Platte Woods, Missouri - Pop: 394
- Crystal Lakes, Missouri - Pop: 390
- Osborn, Missouri (partial) – Pop: 374
- Oakview, Missouri - Pop: 366
- Creighton, Missouri - Pop: 327
- Sibley, Missouri - Pop: 314
- East Lynne, Missouri - Pop: 294
- Northmoor, Missouri - Pop: 291
- Kingston, Missouri - Pop: 290
- Hume, Missouri - Pop: 283
- Henrietta, Missouri - Pop: 278
- Lake Lafayette, Missouri - Pop: 277
- Tracy, Missouri - Pop: 269
- Kidder, Missouri - Pop: 267
- Farley, Missouri - Pop: 265
- Breckenridge, Missouri - Pop: 258
- Parker, Kansas - Pop: 241
- Houston Lake, Missouri - Pop: 229
- Blackburn, Missouri (partial) - Pop: 224
- Bates City, Missouri - Pop: 219
- Blue Mound, Kansas - Pop: 219
- Amsterdam, Missouri – Pop: 218
- Missouri City, Missouri - Pop: 217
- Easton, Kansas - Pop: 213
- Napoleon, Missouri - Pop: 211
- Fontana, Kansas - Pop: 210
- Excelsior Estates, Missouri - Pop: 209
- Mayview, Missouri - Pop: 208
- Prescott, Kansas - Pop: 207
- Mission Woods, Kansas - Pop: 203
- Emma, Missouri (partial) - Pop: 201

== Fewer than 200 ==
- Oakwood, Missouri - Pop: 198
- Homestead, Missouri - Pop: 192
- Birmingham, Missouri - Pop: 189
- Oakwood Park, Missouri - Pop: 189
- Camden, Missouri - Pop: 175
- Cowgill, Missouri - Pop: 168
- Rockville, Missouri – Pop: 135
- Amoret, Missouri – Pop: 133
- Oaks, Missouri - Pop: 128
- Prathersville, Missouri - Pop: 121
- West Line, Missouri - Pop: 117
- Fleming, Missouri - Pop: 114
- Turney, Missouri - Pop: 114
- Lake Annette, Missouri - Pop: 107
- Strasburg, Missouri - Pop: 107
- Ridgely, Missouri - Pop: 104
- Mosby, Missouri - Pop: 101
- Baldwin Park, Missouri - Pop: 85
- Dover, Missouri - Pop: 83
- Gunn City, Missouri - Pop: 80
- Riverview Estates, Missouri - Pop: 78
- Aullville, Missouri - Pop: 77
- Levasy, Missouri - Pop: 77
- Foster, Missouri - Pop: 76
- Merwin, Missouri - Pop: 69
- Unity Village, Missouri - Pop: 66
- Grayson, Missouri - Pop: 61
- Randolph, Missouri - Pop: 57
- Elmira, Missouri - Pop: 39
- Iatan, Missouri - Pop: 39
- Passaic, Missouri - Pop: 26
- River Bend, Missouri - Pop: 3
