= Richmond High School (Missouri) =

School in Richmond, Missouri, United States

Location
- 451 East South; Richmond, Missouri 64085; United States; 39°16′08″N 93°58′05″W

Information
- Type: Public secondary school
- Teaching staff: 32.63 (on an FTE basis)
- Grades: 9–12
- Enrollment: 458 (2023–24)
- Student to teacher ratio: 14.04
- Colors: Red and white
- Nickname: Spartans
- Website: www.richmondspartans.org/o/rhs

Richmond High School, located in Richmond, Missouri, United States is the high school for the Richmond R-XVI School District. Students from Richmond, Camden, Henrietta, Rayville, a portion of Fleming, Knoxville, and Millville attend the school. The Richmond community is the county seat of Ray County, about 30 miles east of Kansas City, Missouri, and just north of the Missouri River. The county is agricultural and business oriented, with many services, churches, banks, and a thriving downtown square featuring a historic courthouse. Richmond High was built in its present location in 1984. The previous location is currently the Richmond City Hall. RHS is a comprehensive high school with approximately 420 students in four grades. There are approximately 40 faculty members. Students followed a traditional seven-period day, with Wednesdays having an 'Advisement' period added up until the end of the 2019-2020 school year. Beginning in the 2020-2021 year, the schedule was formatted to an eight-period day, with the 'Advisement' period becoming a class itself.

In response to the corona virus pandemic, the school board decided to end full-day schedules and shift into a half-day schedule. This split weekdays into A & B days, each day with two shifts. On every other Monday, the morning shift attends school for the first four periods of the day. There is a few hours break between the two shifts until the afternoon one begins. These students attend hours five through six. The next day, the morning shift would then take hours five through six, while the afternoon shift takes hours one through four. This format of schedule began in November 2020 and will end in the early days of February 2021.

The Richmond R-XVI School District is proud of its recent (2019) recognition as a Bronze Level School with the U.S. News & World Report. RHS is fully accredited with the Missouri Department of Elementary and Secondary Education (DESE) and with the North Central Association of Colleges and Schools. Richmond High is the home of the Spartans. It is a member of the Missouri State High School Activities Association (MSHSAA) and the Missouri River Valley Conference (MRVC).

Students may participate in: The Missouri A+ Scholarship program, A+ Tutoring, Scholar Bowl Team, Speech and Debate, Art Club, Cadet Teaching, Drama (musical and dramatic), FFA, FBLA, Flag Corps, FEA, Interact Club (Rotary), Key Club (Kiwanis), Math Club, Music (Concert Band, Concert Choir, Jazz Band, Marching Band, and Chamber Choir), Spanish Club, FCCLA, School-to-Career, Science Olympiad, and Student Council (a member of the Missouri Association of Student Councils).

Available Athletic Programs include: Baseball, Basketball (girls and boys), Cheerleading, Dance Team, Cross Country (girls and boys), Football, Golf (girls and boys), Softball, Tennis (girls and boys), Track (girls and boys), Volleyball and Wrestling. It boasts a new multipurpose building, a new artificial surface track, and has a proud athletic tradition.

Academic programs in Ag Education, English, Science, Social Studies, Math, Business, Vocal and Instrumental Music, Drama, and Family/Consumer Sciences are enhanced by the Missouri A+ Program, Missouri School-to-Work Program, ACT preparation, Advanced Placement and dual-credit courses with regional universities.

The principal is Brandon Quick and the Assistant Principal is Tim Quinn. The superintendent is Greg Darling.

== Notable alumni ==
- Hank Burnine, NFL receiver
- Keyshaun Elliott, college football linebacker
- Lenvil Elliott, NFL running back
- Dan Lanning, NCAA football coach
- Michael Letzig, professional golfer
- Jacob L. Milligan, US congress
- Maurice M. Milligan, U.S. attorney, successfully prosecuted Kansas City political boss Tom Pendergast in 1939
- John Rooney, sports broadcaster
- Forrest Smith, governor (actually graduated from Woodson Institute, Richmond, MO)
- Beryl Wayne Sprinkel, economist and member of the executive office of the US president and was the chairman of the Council of Economic Advisors (CEA) during the Reagan administration
