= Keeney Creek =

Stream in Missouri, U.S.

Keeney Creek or sometimes Keeney Branch is a stream in southwest Ray County of northwest Missouri. It is a tributary of the Fishing River.

The stream headwaters arise just east of Missouri Route 10 approximately one half mile north of Elkhorn at 39°18′49″N 94°06′49″W. The stream flows south past Elkhorn and parallel to Missouri Route N. Approximately six miles south of its origin the stream passes under Missouri Route 210 and the communities of Albany and Orrick. The stream turns southwest passing under Missouri Route Z just north of Floyd and continues to the southwest to its confluence with the Fishing River at 39°10′44″N 94°08′30″W. The confluence is approximately one quarter mile north of the Fishing River confluence with the Missouri River and within the Missouri River floodplain.

The stream was named for a family who lived adjacent to the stream in Orrick Township.

== See also ==
- Tributaries of the Fishing River
- List of rivers in Missouri
