= Missouri Route 210 =

State highway in Missouri, U.S.

Route 210
- MO 210 highlighted in red

Route information
- Maintained by MoDOT
- Length: 33.641 mi (54.140 km)
- Tourist routes: Lewis and Clark Trail

Major junctions
- West end: I-29 / I-35 / US 71 in Kansas City
- I-435 / Route 1 / Route 269 in Kansas City; Route 269 in River Bend
- East end: Route 10 southwest of Richmond

Location
- Country: United States
- State: Missouri

Highway system
- Missouri State Highway System; Interstate; US; State; Supplemental
← Route 202	→ Route 213

Route 210 is a highway in western Missouri that is 24 miles long and is also part of the Lewis and Clark Trail. Its eastern terminus at Route 10 southwest of Richmond and a western terminus at Interstate 29, 35, and U.S. Route 71 in North Kansas City. The majority of its route is along the Missouri River in the Missouri River bottoms.

== Route Description ==
Beginning at the interchange with I-29 and 35, Route 210 immediately intersects with the southern terminus of Route 1 and continues northeast through North Kansas City. It intersects Walker Road in front of NKC Hospital and the Cerner world headquarters before an interchange with Chouteau Trafficway right by the Missouri River. It becomes a limited-access freeway as it enters into Kansas City proper at Randolph Bend. It intersects I-435 and reverts to a four-lane road with stoplights in Randolph, Missouri. As it reenters Kansas City, it travels 2 miles east through the Missouri River bottoms and then turns northeast 3 miles to its intersection with Missouri Route 291 at River Bend, Missouri, which is also part of Jackson County despite being north of the river.

Route 210 exits Kansas City and travels another 7 miles northeasterly before reaching Missouri City where it turns east, travels 4 more miles, and passes through Excelsior Springs Junction just south of Cooley Lake. It then enters Ray County and travels east-southeast for 3.5 miles, before turning east and passing Albany and turning northeast towards Richmond. The highway travels northeast 6 miles before reaching its eastern terminus at Route 10 west of Richmond.

== Major intersections ==
County	Location	mi	km	Destinations	Notes
Clay	Kansas City	0.000	0.000	Armour Road	Continuation past western end
Clay	Kansas City	0.136– 0.158	0.219– 0.254	I-29 / I-35 / US 71	I-35 exit 6
Clay	Kansas City	0.440	0.708	Route 1 (Vernon Street)	
Clay	Kansas City	1.612	2.594	Route 269 (Choteau Trafficway)	Diamond interchange
Clay	Kansas City	2.442– 2.707	3.930– 4.356	Brighton Avenue, Searcy Creek Parkway	Interchange
Clay	Kansas City	3.811– 3.827	6.133– 6.159	I-435 – Independence, Claycomo	I-435 exit 55; diverging diamond interchange
Jackson	River Bend	10.126	16.296	Route 291 / Lewis and Clark Trail – Independence, Liberty	Diamond interchange; west end of Lewis & Clark Trail overlap
Clay	Fishing River Township	15.686	25.244	Route EE north	
Clay	Missouri City	17.785	28.622	Route JJ – Missouri City, Excelsior Springs	
Clay	Fishing River Township	21.374	34.398	Route N north – Excelsior Springs	
Ray	Orrick	26.642	42.876	Route O north to Route 10 / Route Z south – Orrick	
Ray	Orrick Township	27.724	44.617	Route T east / Lewis and Clark Trail – Camden	East end of Lewis & Clark Trail overlap
Ray	Orrick Township	31.171	50.165	Route EE north	
Ray	Richmond Township	33.641	54.140	Route 10 – Excelsior Springs, Richmond	
1.000 mi = 1.609 km; 1.000 km = 0.621 mi: Concurrency terminus
