= Dangerous Branch =

Stream in Missouri, US

Dangerous Branch is a stream in Ray County in the U.S. state of Missouri. It is a tributary of the Crooked River.

The stream headwaters arise at 39°20′46″N 93°49′51″W adjacent to the west side of Missouri Route A and 8.5 miles northeast of Richmond. The stream flows south-southwest passing east of the community of Morton to its confluence with Crooked River approximately six miles east of Richmond at 39°17′12″N 93°51′18″W.

Dangerous Branch was so named because it is prone to flash flooding.

== See also ==
- List of rivers of Missouri
