= Dockery, Missouri =

Unincorporated community in Missouri, U.S.

Coordinates: 39°21′40″N 93°59′19″W

Dockery is an unincorporated community in Ray County, in the U.S. state of Missouri and part of the Kansas City metropolitan area.

The community is on Missouri Route 13 approximately five miles north-northeast of Richmond. McDonald Branch joins the Crooked River a mile southwest before flowing past the south side of the community.

== History ==
A post office called Dockery was established in 1888, and remained in operation until 1904. The community has the name of Alexander Monroe Dockery, a state legislator and afterward 30th Governor of Missouri.
