= St. Cloud, Ray County, Missouri =

Unincorporated community in Missouri, U.S.

Coordinates: 39°17′34″N 94°01′06″W

St. Cloud is an unincorporated community in Ray County, in the U.S. state of Missouri and part of the Kansas City metropolitan area.

The community is 2.5 miles west-northwest of Richmond and one mile north of Missouri Route 10. The West Fork of Crooked River flows past the north side of the community.

== History ==
A variant name was "Saint Cloud Springs". The town site was platted as Saint Cloud Springs in 1881, taking its name from a spring near the original town site.
