= Sandals, Missouri =

Unincorporated community in Missouri, U.S.

Coordinates: 39°27′38″N 94°05′02″W

Sandals is an unincorporated community in Ray County, in the U.S. state of Missouri.

The community is at the intersection of Missouri routes D and BB. The Crooked River flows past about one mile west and Knoxville on Missouri Route 13 is approximately three miles to the east-southeast.

== History ==
A post office called Sandals was established in 1888, and remained in operation until 1902. The community was named after the proprietor of a nearby sawmill.
