= Morton, Missouri =

Unincorporated community in Missouri, U.S.

Coordinates: 39°19′10″N 93°51′39″W

Morton is an unincorporated community in southeast Ray County, in the U.S. state of Missouri and part of the Kansas City metropolitan area.

The community is one mile west of Missouri Route A approximately six miles east-northeast of Richmond. It is located on a ridge above Dangerous Branch which joins Crooked River two miles to the south.

== History ==
A post office called Morton was established in 1874, and remained in operation until 1904. The community has the name of one Mr. Morton, the original owner of the site.
