= Keyshaun Elliott =

American football player (born 2003)

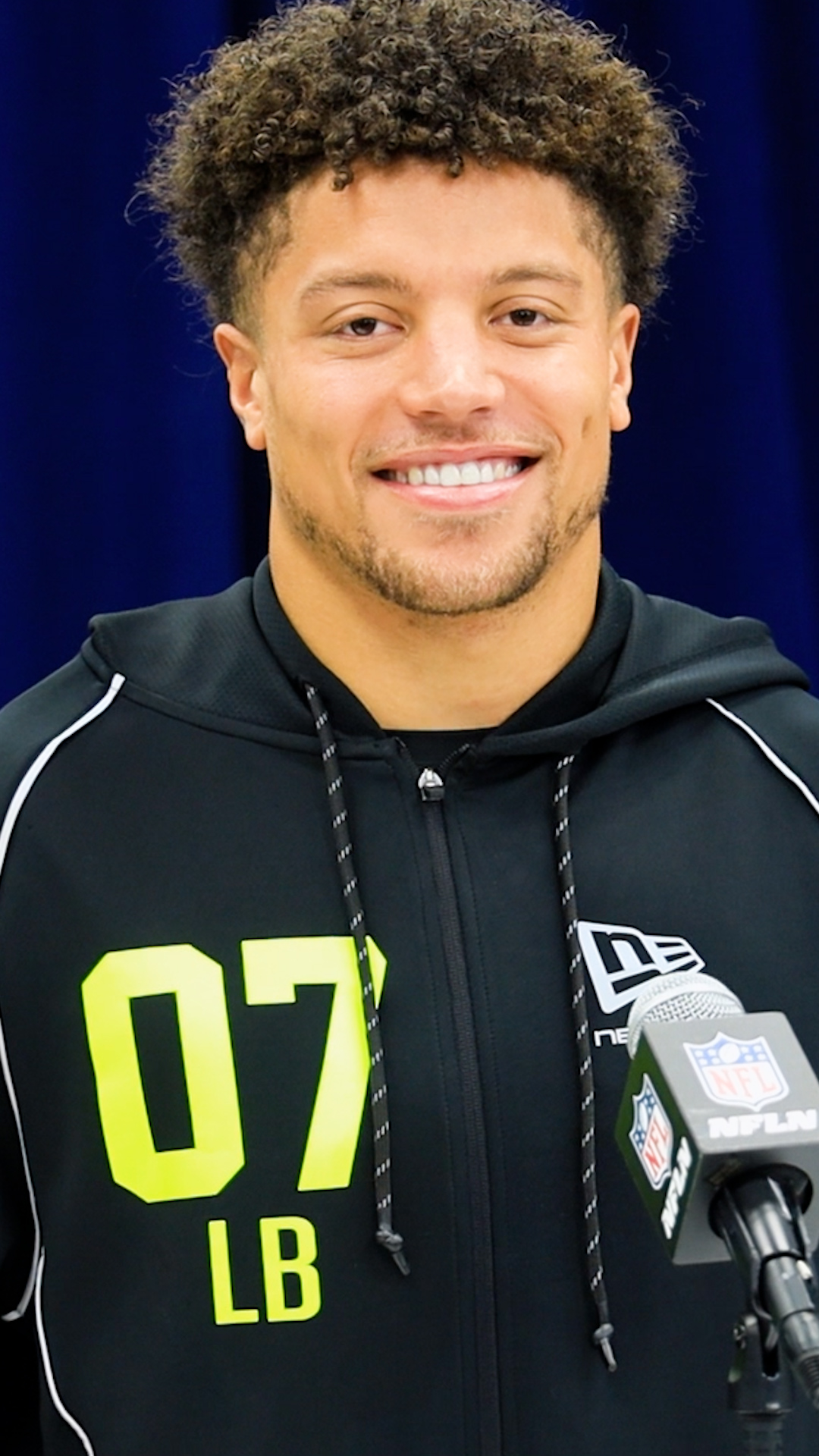
- Elliott in 2026

No. 49 – Chicago Bears
- Position: Linebacker
- Roster status: Active

Personal information
- Born: December 12, 2003 (age 22); Richmond, Missouri, U.S.
- Listed height: 6 ft 2 in (1.88 m)
- Listed weight: 233 lb (106 kg)

Career information
- High school: Richmond (Richmond, Missouri)
- College: New Mexico State (2022–2023); Arizona State (2024–2025)
- NFL draft: 2026: 5th round, 166th overall pick

Career history
- Chicago Bears (2026–present)

Awards and highlights
- 2× Second-team All-Big 12 (2024, 2025); Second-team All-CUSA (2023)
- Stats at Pro Football Reference

Keyshaun Elliott (born December 12, 2003) is an American professional football linebacker for the Chicago Bears of the National Football League (NFL). He played college football for the New Mexico State Aggies and the Arizona State Sun Devils and was selected by the Bears in the fifth round of the 2026 NFL draft.

== Early life ==
Elliott attended Richmond High School in Richmond, Missouri. Coming out of high school, he committed to play college football for the New Mexico State Aggies.

== College career ==
=== New Mexico State ===
As a freshman in 2022, Elliott appeared in all 12 games with one start, where he notched 27 tackles, a pass deflection, and a fumble recovery. During the 2023 season, he posted 111 tackles with ten being for a loss and two and a half sacks, earning second-team all-conference honors. After the season, Elliott entered his name into the NCAA transfer portal.

=== Arizona State ===
Elliott transferred to play for the Arizona State Sun Devils. In the 2025 Peach Bowl, he notched eight tackles versus Texas. Elliott finished the 2024 season, recording 65 tackles with four being for a loss, two sacks, two pass deflections, and an interception. In week four of the 2025 season, he totaled ten tackles with two being for a loss, and a sack against Baylor. For his performance on the season, Elliott was named second-team all-Big 12. He accepted an invite to participate in the 2026 East-West Shrine Bowl.

== Professional career ==
Pre-draft measurables
Height	Weight	Arm length	Hand span	Wingspan	40-yard dash	10-yard split	20-yard split	20-yard shuttle	Three-cone drill	Vertical jump	Broad jump	Bench press
6 ft 1 3/4 in (1.87 m)	231 lb (105 kg)	31 1/4 in (0.79 m)	9 1/4 in (0.23 m)	6 ft 4 in (1.93 m)	4.58 s	1.66 s	2.74 s	4.38 s	7.02 s	38.0 in (0.97 m)	10 ft 5 in (3.18 m)	21 reps
All values from NFL Combine/Pro Day

Elliott was selected by the Chicago Bears in the fifth round with the 166th overall pick of the 2026 NFL Draft. He signed his rookie contract on May 8.

== Personal life ==
Elliott is the grandson of the late NFL running back, Lenvil Elliott.
