= Hank Burnine =

American football player (1932–2020)

No. 83, 84
- Position: End

Personal information
- Born: November 9, 1932; Henrietta, Missouri, U.S.
- Died: January 21, 2020 (aged 87); Higginsville, Missouri, U.S.
- Listed height: 6 ft 2 in (1.88 m)
- Listed weight: 188 lb (85 kg)

Career information
- High school: Richmond (Richmond, Missouri)
- College: Missouri (1953–1955)
- NFL draft: 1955: 12th round, 140th overall pick

Career history
- New York Giants (1956); Philadelphia Eagles (1956–1957)

Awards and highlights
- NFL champion (1956); First-team All-American (1955); First-team All-Big Seven (1955)

Career NFL statistics
- Receptions: 17
- Receiving yards: 271
- Receiving touchdowns: 2
- Stats at Pro Football Reference

Harold Henry "Hank" Burnine (November 9, 1932 – January 21, 2020) was an American professional football end who played two seasons in the National Football League (NFL) with the New York Giants and Philadelphia Eagles. He was selected by the Giants in the twelfth round of the 1955 NFL draft after playing college football at the University of Missouri.

== Early life ==
Harold Henry Burnine was born on November 9, 1932, in Henrietta, Missouri. He attended Richmond High School in Richmond, Missouri.

== College career ==
Burnine played for the Missouri Tigers from 1953 to 1955. He led the NCAA in receptions with 44 and in receiving yards with 594 his senior year in 1955 while also earning All-American honors. He recorded career totals of 75 receptions for 1,145 yards. Burnine was team captain his senior season and also played in the Blue–Gray Football Classic and Senior Bowl. He won two track letters for the Tigers as a broad jumper. He was inducted into the University of Missouri Intercollegiate Athletics Hall of Fame in 1993.

== Professional career ==
Burnine was selected in the 12th round by the New York Giants with the 140th pick in the 1955 NFL draft. He played in one game for the Giants during the 1956 season.

Burnine played in fourteen games, starting seven, for the Philadelphia Eagles from 1956 to 1957.

== Personal life ==
Burnine was also a sergeant in the United States Army. He started selling life insurance during the college football offseason.

He died on January 21, 2020, in Higginsville, Missouri at age 87.

== See also ==
- List of NCAA major college football yearly receiving leaders
