= Taitsville, Missouri =

Unincorporated community in Missouri, U.S.

Coordinates: 39°29′04″N 93°57′29″W

Taitsville is an unincorporated community in northern Ray County, in the U.S. state of Missouri and part of the Kansas City metropolitan area.

The community is located at the end of Missouri Route VV approximately four miles northeast of Knoxville. The East Fork of Crooked River flows past the east side of the community.

== History ==
Taitsville was platted in 1871 by James and John Tait, who gave the town their last name. A post office called Taitsville was established in 1872, and remained in operation until 1904.
