= Russellville, Ray County, Missouri =

Unincorporated hamlet in Missouri, U.S.

Coordinates: 39°24′24″N 93°49′49″W

Russellville is an unincorporated community in eastern Ray County, in the U.S. state of Missouri and part of the Kansas City metropolitan area. The community is eleven miles northeast of Richmond and 3.5 miles west of the Ray-Carroll county line.

== History ==
Russellville has the name of William Russell, an early settler. A variant name was "Fox". A post office at Fox was established in 1864, and remained in operation until 1904.
