= Knoxville Township, Ray County, Missouri =

Township in Ray County, Missouri, U.S.

Coordinates: 39.4547°N 94.0147°W

Knoxville Township is an inactive township in Ray County, in the U.S. state of Missouri. It is part of the Kansas City metropolitan area.

== History ==
Knoxville Township was founded in 1841, taking its name from the town of Knoxville.
