= McDonald Branch (Crooked River tributary) =

Stream in Ray County, Missouri, US

Coordinates: 39.3544548°N 93.9938306°W

McDonald Branch is a stream in Ray County in the U.S. state of Missouri. It is a tributary of the Crooked River.

McDonald Branch is named after Jeremiah McDonald, the original owner of the site.

== See also ==
- List of rivers of Missouri
