= New Garden =

New Garden or Newgarden may refer to:

== Places ==
In the United States

- New Garden, Missouri, an unincorporated community
- New Garden, Ohio
- New Garden Township, Wayne County, Indiana
- New Garden Township, Pennsylvania
- New Garden Airport, in Pennsylvania

Elsewhere

- New Garden, Potsdam, a park in Potsdam, Germany

== People ==
- Josef Newgarden (born 1990), American racing driver
- Mark Newgarden (born 1959), American underground cartoonist
- Paul Newgarden (1892–1944), American soldier
