= Missouri Route 10 =

State highway in Missouri, U.S.

Route 10
- Route 10 in red Business route in blue

Route information
- Maintained by MoDOT
- Length: 46 mi (74 km)
- Existed: 1922–present

Major junctions
- West end: US 69 in Excelsior Springs
- Route 13 in Richmond
- East end: US 24 / US 65 south of Carrollton

Location
- Country: United States
- State: Missouri
- Counties: Clay; Ray; Caroll

Highway system
- Missouri State Highway System; Interstate; US; State; Supplemental
← Route 9	→ Route 11

Route 10 is a highway in Clay, Ray, and Carroll counties in western Missouri, United States. Its eastern terminus is at the concurrency of US 24/US 65 in Carrollton. Its western terminus is at US 69 in Excelsior Springs. A business loop of Route 10 travels through Richmond.

== Route description ==
The western terminus of Route 10 is at an interchange with US 69. Then, it goes through a stretch with lots of turns in downtown Excelsior Springs. Between downtown Excelsior Springs and Route 10 Business, it intersects with a few supplemental routes. Shortly after intersecting with Route 10 Business, it meets with Route 210, which is where Route 210 ends. It also begins to enter Richmond there. Then, it has an interchange with Route T, which, according to satellite imagery, used to be the old alignment of Route 210. Shortly after, it has another interchange with Route 13. Then, it has another intersection with Route 10 Business, and then it leaves Richmond. Then, it passes through Hardin and Norborne, with rural farmland in-between. Then, Route 10 enters the southern part of Carrolton and intersects with Route 65 Business. Shortly after that, the route ends at an interchange with US 65 and US 24.

== History ==
From 1922 to 1926, US 24 east of Carrollton was marked as Route 10. Until improvements to US 69 were carried through in the 1960s, Route 10 traveled along the current Route H through Prathersville and Mosby into Liberty. In Liberty, Route 10 followed Liberty Drive along Glenaire into Pleasant Valley, where it followed the current US 69 west to North Brighton Avenue. At North Brighton, it turned south and onto Winn Road, crossing what is now Interstate 35 (I-35). It follows sections of road that no longer exist to connect to Winn Road, traveling south and into Avondale as Walker Road. There are signs in Avondale to this day marking it as "Highway 10". It then followed the current route of Route 210 and Armour Road into North Kansas City, turning southward at Burlington Road/Route 9 and crossing the Missouri River terminating at US 24/US 40 in downtown Kansas City.

== Major intersections ==
County	Location	mi	km	Destinations	Notes
Clay	Excelsior Springs			US 69 south	Western terminus; interchange
Ray				Route 10 Bus. east – Richmond	
Ray				Route 210 west – Orrick, North Kansas City	
Ray	Richmond			Route T / Lewis and Clark Trail west – Richmond, Camden	Interchange; west end of Lewis and Clark Trail concurrency
Ray	Richmond			Route 13 – Polo, Henrietta	Interchange
Ray				Route 10 Bus. west	
Carroll	Carrollton			US 65 Bus. north – Carrollton	west end of US 65 Bus. concurrency
Carroll				US 24 / US 65 / Lewis and Clark Trail east – Moberly, Chillicothe, Waverly	Eastern terminus; interchange; east end of US 65 Bus. / Lewis and Clark Trail concurrency
1.000 mi = 1.609 km; 1.000 km = 0.621 mi

== Business route ==
Route 10 Business
- Location: Richmond
- Length: 5.41 mi (8.71 km)

A five mile business route of MO 10 exists in Richmond. According to satellite imagery, Route 10 used to run on Route 10 Business.

== See also ==
- List of state highways in Missouri
