= Crooked River Township, Ray County, Missouri =

Township in Ray County, Missouri

Coordinates: 39.2828°N 93.8339°W

Crooked River Township is an inactive township in Ray County, in the U.S. state of Missouri. It is part of the Kansas City metropolitan area.

== History ==
Crooked River Township was founded in 1823. It was named from the river that runs through it.
