= Grape Grove Township, Ray County, Missouri =

Township in Missouri, United States

Coordinates: 39°26′41″N 93°50′04″W

Grape Grove Township is an inactive township in Ray County, in the U.S. state of Missouri. It is part of the Kansas City metropolitan area.

Grape Grove Township in Ray Co. Missouri was federally surveyed as Grape Grove in 1850s. Named by Kentucky and Virginia settlers who found a large concentration of grape varieties that were wild and abundant they settled in and now is currently Section 14, about three miles north of the present site. This settlement was and is currently called Georgeville.

Since most activities in that area centered around the Grange Hall, the settlers decided that it would be wise to move their village to the site of the Grange Hall. When the move was completed the name of Georgeville was then given to the entire area instead of Grange Hall. As the area began to be settled the need for a post-office, general store and a doctor became evident. The first store, a grocery store and a produce house were owned by James Hatfield and operated by John Kincaid.

== History ==
Grape Grove Township was founded in 1838, and so named on account of wild grapes growing within its borders.
