= Rockingham, Missouri =

Unincorporated community in Missouri, U.S.

Coordinates: 39°21′24″N 93°46′57″W

Rockingham is an unincorporated community in eastern Ray County, in the U.S. state of Missouri and part of the Kansas City metropolitan area.

The community is on Missouri Route AA 1.3 miles west of the Ray-Carroll county line. Richmond is eleven miles to the southwest.

== History ==
A post office called Rockingham was established in 1888, and remained in operation until 1904. The community was named after Rockingham County, Virginia, the former home of a share of the first settlers.
