= Elkhorn, Missouri =

Unincorporated community in Missouri, U.S.

Coordinates: 39°18′33″N 94°06′46″W

Elkhorn is an unincorporated community in southwest Ray County, in the U.S. state of Missouri and part of the Kansas City metropolitan area.

The community is on Missouri Route 10 approximately six miles east-southeast of Excelsior Springs in adjacent Clay County. The headwaters of Keeney Creek are one-half mile north of the community.

== History ==
Elkhorn was platted in 1837, and according to one tradition, so named on account of an elk horn discovered at the town site. A variant name was "Crab Orchard". A post office called Elkhorn was established in 1835, the name was changed to Crab Orchard in 1843, and the post office closed in 1904.
