= Vibbard, Missouri =

- Census designated place
- Interactive map of Vibbard, Missouri
- Coordinates: 39°22′50″N 94°08′47″W
- Country: United States
- State: Missouri
- County: Ray

Area
  - Total: 1.41 sq mi (3.64 km^{2})
  - Land: 1.40 sq mi (3.63 km^{2})
  - Water: 0.0039 sq mi (0.01 km^{2})
- Elevation: 1,037 ft (316 m)

Population (2020)
  - Total: 215
  - Density: 153.5/sq mi (59.27/km^{2})
- FIPS code: 29-75994
- GNIS feature ID: 2806422

Vibbard is an unincorporated community in northwest Ray County, in the U.S. state of Missouri and part of the Kansas City metropolitan area.

As of the 2020 census, Vibbard had a population of 215.

The community is on Missouri Route M approximately three miles north of Wood Heights and five miles northeast of Excelsior Springs in adjacent Clay County.

== History ==
[5] A post office called Vibbard was established in 1870, and remained in operation until 1939.[6]

== Demographics ==
Historical population
Census	Pop.	Note	%±
2020	215		—
U.S. Decennial Census

Vibbard first appeared as a census designated place in the 2020 U.S. census.

== Education ==
Most of it is in the Excelsior Springs 40 School District while a part is in the Lawson R-XIV School District.
