= Camden Township, Ray County, Missouri =

Township in Ray County, Missouri, U.S.

Camden Township
- Township
- Interactive map of Camden Township
- Coordinates: 39°12′38″N 93°57′56″W
- Country: United States
- State: Missouri
- County: Ray

Area
  - Total: 39.1 sq mi (101 km^{2})
  - Land: 37.23 sq mi (96.4 km^{2})
  - Water: 1.87 sq mi (4.8 km^{2}) 4.78%
- Elevation: 712 ft (217 m)

Population (2020)
  - Total: 594
  - Density: 15.9/sq mi (6.1/km^{2})
- FIPS code: 29-17710756
- GNIS feature ID: 767268

Camden Township is a township in Ray County, Missouri, United States. At the 2020 census, its population was 594. It is part of the Kansas City metropolitan area.

== History ==
Camden Township was organized in 1841, taking its name from the community of Camden, Missouri.
