= Millville, Missouri =

Unincorporated community in Missouri, U.S.

Coordinates: 39°24′19″N 93°55′05″W

Millville is an unincorporated community in Ray County, in the U.S. state of Missouri and part of the Kansas City metropolitan area.

The community is on Missouri Route K and is approximately 8.5 miles northeast of Richmond. The East Fork of Crooked River flows past the west side of the community.

== History ==
Millville was platted in 1873, and named for a watermill near the original town site. A post office called Millville was established in 1849, and remained in operation until 1906.
