= Georgeville, Missouri =

Unincorporated community in Missouri, U.S.

Coordinates: 39°29′46″N 93°54′30″W

Georgeville is an unincorporated community in northeast Ray County, in the U.S. state of Missouri. It is part of the Kansas City metropolitan area.

The community is two miles south of the Ray-Caldwell county line and four miles south of Cowgill. Richmond is 14.5 miles to the south-southeast.

== History ==
A post office called Georgeville was established in 1867, and remained in operation until 1904. The community was named after an early citizen.
