= Maurice M. Milligan =

American prosecutor (1884–1959)

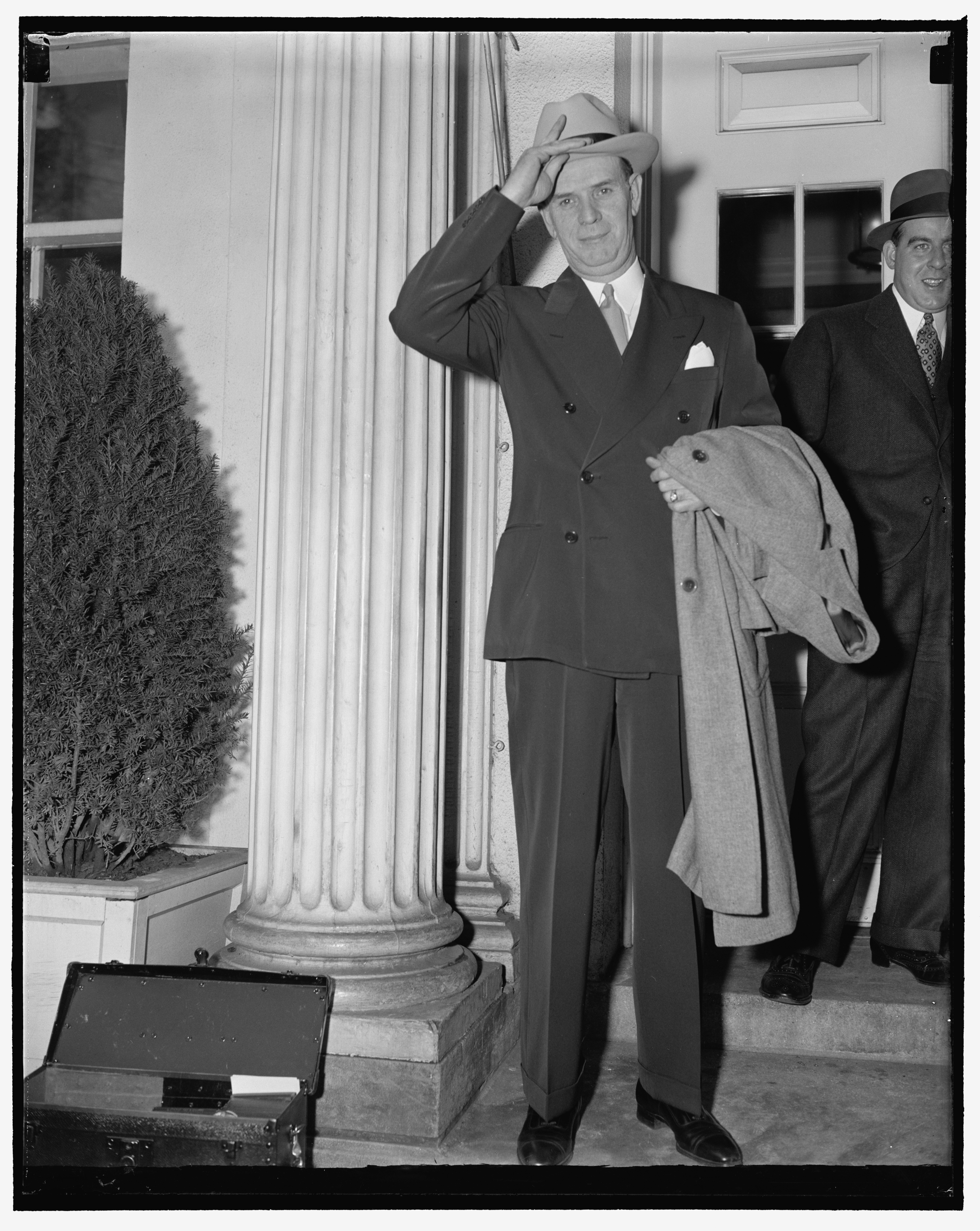

United States Attorney for the Western District of Missouri
- In office 1940 – June 1945
- Preceded by: Richard K. Phelps
- Succeeded by: Sam M. Wear
- In office 1934–1940
- Preceded by: William L. Vandeventer
- Succeeded by: Richard K. Phelps

Personal details
- Born: November 23, 1884 Richmond, Missouri, U.S.
- Died: June 19, 1959 (aged 74) Kansas City, Missouri, U.S.
- Resting place: Sunny Slope Cemetery, Richmond, Missouri
- Party: Democratic
- Education: University of Missouri
- Profession: Attorney

Maurice Morton Milligan (November 23, 1884 – June 19, 1959), a U.S. Attorney for the Western District of Missouri, is most famous for the successful 1939 prosecution of the Kansas City boss Tom Pendergast.

Born in Richmond, Missouri, Milligan received his bachelor's and law degrees from the University of Missouri. He practiced law and became Richmond city attorney and then probate judge for Ray County, Missouri. He was a federal prosecutor from 1934 to 1945. After toppling Pendergast, Milligan ran in 1940 for the US Senate seat held by Harry S. Truman. Milligan and Missouri Governor Lloyd C. Stark split the anti-Pendergast vote in the Democratic primary and so Truman won. Truman had defeated Milligan's brother, Jacob "Tuck" Milligan, in the Democratic primary for Truman's first Senate term in 1934.

Maurice Milligan began his assault on the Pendergast machine after the 1936 election and got convictions on 259 of 278 defendants. Milligan's case against Pendergast centered on a $750,000 insurance payoff scam and a failure to pay federal income taxes from 1927 to 1937. Pendergast ultimately pleaded guilty to two charges of income tax evasion and was fined $10,000 and sentenced to 15 months in federal prison.

In 1948, Milligan wrote a book about his exploits: Missouri Waltz, The Inside Story of the Pendergast Machine by the Man Who Smashed It (ISBN 1-299-19592-X). He died in Kansas City, Missouri. He is interred in Sunny Slope Cemetery in Richmond, Missouri.
