= Richmond Township, Ray County, Missouri =

Inactive township in the US state of Missouri

Coordinates: 39.3083°N 93.9958°W

Richmond Township is an inactive township in Ray County, in the U.S. state of Missouri. It is part of the Kansas City metropolitan area.

== History ==
Richmond Township was founded in 1829, taking its name from the town of Richmond, Missouri.
