= Lakeview, Missouri =

Unincorporated community in Missouri, U.S.

Coordinates: 39.3225148°N 93.7768837°W

Lakeview is an unincorporated community in Ray County, in the U.S. state of Missouri and part of the Kansas City metropolitan area.

== History ==
A post office called Lake View was established in 1893, and remained in operation until 1904. The community was on Lake Heisinger, hence the name.
