= Floyd, Ray County, Missouri =

Unincorporated community in the US state of Missouri

Coordinates: 39°11′33″N 94°06′39″W

Floyd is an unincorporated community in southwest Ray County, in the U.S. state of Missouri. It is part of the Kansas City metropolitan area.

The community is located on Missouri Route Z approximately 1.5 miles south of Orrick. Keeney Creek flows past one half mile northwest of the community and the Missouri River is two miles southwest.

== History ==
Floyd was originally called "Alfred", and under the latter name was platted in 1888. The present name is after one Mr. Floyd, a railroad official.
