= Lenvil Elliott =

American football player (1951–2008)

No. 36, 35
- Position: Running back

Personal information
- Born: September 2, 1951; Lexington, Missouri, U.S.
- Died: October 12, 2008 (aged 57); Richmond, Missouri, U.S.
- Listed height: 6 ft 0 in (1.83 m)
- Listed weight: 205 lb (93 kg)

Career information
- High school: Richmond (MO)
- College: Northeast Missouri State
- NFL draft: 1973: 10th round, 249th overall pick

Career history
- Cincinnati Bengals (1973–1978); San Francisco 49ers (1979–1981)

Awards and highlights
- Super Bowl champion (XVI)

Career NFL statistics
- Rushing attempts: 440
- Rushing yards: 1,900
- Rushing touchdowns: 8
- Receptions: 159
- Receiving yards: 1,484
- Receiving touchdowns: 10
- Stats at Pro Football Reference

Lenvil Elliott (September 2, 1951 – October 12, 2008) was an American professional football player who was a running back for nine seasons in the National Football League (NFL). He was a part of the San Francisco 49ers Super Bowl XVI winning team.

== Early life ==
Elliot was born in Lexington, Missouri, to Lenvil Nelson and Helen Constance (Williams) Elliott. He grew up in Richmond, Missouri, and was a 1969 graduate of Richmond High School, where he participated in both football and track.

His Richmond coach, Tom Adams, summed up Elliott's high school career reflecting on Elliott's final prep game by scoring all 19 points and running for 201 yards against a Slater team that had lost just one game: "It was a cold, nasty night and no one was real excited about playing," Adams said. "Slater scored first and we came back and scored as Lenvil had a remarkable run, 66 yards from the goal, but he went all over the field. I can remember watching the film over and over, and counting the number of times a Slater player touched or tried to tackle him. The last five yards to the end zone he drug or carried a couple of guys trying to get him down. He was not about to lose his final game in a Spartan uniform." Elliott was named to the All-State Team.

== College career ==
He attended Northeast Missouri State University (now Truman State University) in Kirksville, Missouri, leading the Bulldogs to three consecutive Mid-American Intercollegiate Athletic Association (MIAA) titles. He became a starter at running back as a sophomore and earned honorable mention All-MIAA honors. He was a second-team choice as a junior, and landed on the first team as a senior when he gained 1,138 yards rushing, an average of 113.8 yards per game.

His former coach, Russ Sloan, said Elliott was the first player he targeted upon taking over at the Kirksville school. "I thought at one point I had lost him to Texas-El Paso, but he called me at home and asked if he could still come to Northeast Missouri," Sloan recalled. "I cannot begin to describe how awesome Lenvil was in his first full contact scrimmage as a freshman. I knew then that he was special, and in my playing career at Missouri I had not seen a better back in The Big 8. Lenvil could do it all. He was a great runner, solid blocker and a superb receiver out of the backfield. His 40 time was 4.3, and rarely was the first tackler able to bring Lenvil down."

Elliott also excelled at track. He was one of the Bulldogs' top sprinters as a senior, running a leg on the 440-yard relay team and finishing third in the MIAA outdoor triple jump.

At NMSU, among his big games was when his three touchdowns led the Bulldogs to a 20–7 win to spoil Missouri State University's homecoming. He received a bachelor of arts degree in education in 1973.

His football abilities and track speed in the 100-yard dash (about 9.6) attracted professional football scouts' attention.

== NFL career ==
Elliott was selected in the 10th round of the 1973 NFL draft by the Cincinnati Bengals. He played running back for the Bengals from 1973 to 1979. Playing behind starting running backs Essex Johnson and Boobie Clark, his rookie year he saw action in only six games, but made the most of it with 122 yards in 22 carries (a 5.5 average) and one touchdown with one reception for a 12-yard touchdown. The Bengals posted a 10–4 record before losing in the first round of the AFC Playoffs to the eventual Super Bowl champion Miami Dolphins.

The next season, 1974, was his most productive as he became a model of consistency for four seasons. In 10 games, he rushed for 345 yards in 68 carries (a 5.1 average) and one touchdown plus 18 receptions for 187 yards (a 10.4 average) and one touchdown. He also returned 13 kickoffs for 272 yards, a 20.9 average.

In 1975, he rushed for 308 yards in 71 carries (a 4.3 average) with one touchdown and 20 receptions for 196 yards (a 9.8 average) and three touchdowns. He scored a post-season touchdown on a six-yard run in the third quarter of the Bengals' 24–14 loss to the Oakland Raiders.

He followed that season, in 1976, with 276 yards in 69 carries (a 4.0 average) with 22 receptions for 188 yards (an 8.5 average) and tied his career-high of three receiving touchdowns. However, he fumbled five times.

In 1977, he rushed for 269 yards on 64 carries (a 4.1 average) and 29 receptions for 238 yards (an 8.2 average) and one touchdown. That season, he had his longest career run of 32 yards.

In 1978, he fell to 75 yards in 29 attempts (a 2.6 average) and 12 receptions for 100 yards (an 8.3 average).

He was traded to the San Francisco 49ers in 1979. for whom he played from 1979 to 1981. In 1979, he rushed for 135 yards in 33 carries (a 4.1 average) and a career-high three rushing touchdowns. He also had 23 receptions for 197 yards (an 8.6 average).

In 1980, his eighth NFL season, he came on strong with 341 yards in 76 carries (a 4.5 average) and two touchdowns with 27 receptions for a career-high 285 yards (a 10.6 average) and one touchdown. He also had the longest reception of his career, a 45-yard touchdown pass from Joe Montana in the third quarter to give the 49ers a 20–14 lead over the Tampa Bay Buccaneers before finally falling 24–23.

He was cut by the 49ers during the 1981 training camp, but then re-signed. During his ninth and final NFL season, he was hampered by a knee injury and had only 29 yards on seven carries (a 4.1 average) and seven receptions for 81 yards.

In the 1981 postseason, he played a key role in the 49ers' NFC Championship Game victory over the Dallas Cowboys on January 10, 1982, at Candlestick Park after being activated just a week earlier after a knee injury. Elliott rushed four times for 31 yards on the 49ers' 89-yard final drive, culminating in "The Catch", Dwight Clark's famous six-yard touchdown reception from Joe Montana with 51 seconds left in the game. Elliott suited up but did not play (due to his knee injury) but he earned a Super Bowl ring in the 49ers' victory over his old team, the Cincinnati Bengals.

Following Super Bowl XVI, he retired. He finished his career with 1,900 yards rushing, 1,484 yards receiving, and 18 total touchdowns (eight rushing and 10 receiving).

== NFL career statistics ==
Legend
**Bold**	Career high

=== Regular season ===
Year	Team	Games		Rushing					Receiving				
Year	Team	GP	GS	Att	Yds	Avg	Lng	TD	Rec	Yds	Avg	Lng	TD
1973	CIN	6	0	22	122	**5.5**	15	1	1	12	**12.0**	12	1
1974	CIN	10	2	68	**345**	5.1	26	1	18	187	10.4	28	1
1975	CIN	14	**5**	71	308	4.3	27	1	20	196	9.8	31	**3**
1976	CIN	12	0	69	276	4.0	24	0	22	188	8.5	29	**3**
1977	CIN	14	3	65	269	4.1	**32**	0	**29**	238	8.2	33	1
1978	CIN	10	3	29	75	2.6	12	0	12	100	8.3	18	0
1979	SFO	**16**	0	33	135	4.1	12	**3**	23	197	8.6	30	0
1980	SFO	15	3	**76**	341	4.5	20	2	27	**285**	10.6	**45**	1
1981	SFO	4	0	7	29	4.1	9	0	7	81	11.6	19	0
		101	16	440	1,900	4.3	32	8	159	1,484	9.3	45	10

=== Playoffs ===
Year	Team	Games		Rushing					Receiving				
Year	Team	GP	GS	Att	Yds	Avg	Lng	TD	Rec	Yds	Avg	Lng	TD
1973	CIN	1	0	7	15	2.1	5	0	**9**	**53**	5.9	16	0
1975	CIN	1	0	4	25	**6.3**	9	**1**	1	9	9.0	9	0
1981	SFO	**2**	0	**10**	**48**	4.8	**11**	0	2	29	**14.5**	**24**	0
		4	0	21	88	4.2	11	1	12	91	7.6	24	0

== Later life ==
Following his retirement, Elliott returned to his hometown of Richmond, Missouri, and was a member of the Laborers Union Local #1290. In 1989, he was inducted into the Truman State University Hall of Fame.

Elliott died of a heart attack at 11:10 p.m., Sunday, October 12, 2008, at the Ray County, Missouri Memorial Hospital in Richmond. He was survived by a son, Lenvil O. Elliott II, a daughter, Melissa R. Elliott, grandsons James Kearney II and RaShaad Elliott, and his former wife and lifelong friend, Linda Elliott.
