= Fishing River Township, Ray County, Missouri =

Township in Ray County, Missouri, U.S.

Coordinates: 39.3269°N 94.1581°W

Fishing River Township is an inactive township in Ray County, in the U.S. state of Missouri. It is part of the Kansas City metropolitan area.

== History ==
Fishing River Township was founded in 1821, taking its name from the Fishing River.
