= Albany, Ray County, Missouri =

Unincorporated community in Missouri, U.S.

Coordinates: 39°13′24″N 94°06′48″W

Albany is an unincorporated community in Ray County, in the U.S. state of Missouri and part of the Kansas City metropolitan area.

== History ==
Albany was laid out in 1854, and most likely was named after Albany, New York. A variant name was "Ada". A post office called Ada was established in 1864, and remained in operation until 1873.
