= Homestead, Missouri =

- Village
- Location of Homestead, Missouri
- Coordinates: 39°21′47″N 94°11′56″W
- Country: United States
- State: Missouri
- County: Ray

Area
  - Total: 0.16 sq mi (0.41 km^{2})
  - Land: 0.16 sq mi (0.41 km^{2})
  - Water: 0 sq mi (0.00 km^{2})
- Elevation: 892 ft (272 m)

Population (2020)
  - Total: 192
  - Density: 1,210.4/sq mi (467.33/km^{2})
- Time zone: UTC-6 (Central (CST))
  - Summer (DST): UTC-5 (CDT)
- FIPS code: 29-32806
- GNIS feature ID: 2398536
- Website: homesteadvillagemo.com

Homestead is a village in Ray County, Missouri, and part of the Kansas City metropolitan area within the United States. As of the 2020 census, its population was 192.

== Geography ==
According to the United States Census Bureau, the village has a total area of 0.16 square miles (0.41 km^{2}), all land.

== Demographics ==
Historical population
Census	Pop.	Note	%±
1980	138		—
1990	177		28.3%
2000	181		2.3%
2010	185		2.2%
2020	192		3.8%
U.S. Decennial Census

=== 2010 census ===
As of the census of 2010, there were 185 people, 71 households, and 50 families living in the village. The population density was 1,156.3 inhabitants per square mile (446.4/km^{2}). There were 77 housing units at an average density of 481.3 per square mile (185.8/km^{2}). The racial makeup of the village was 96.2% White, 1.6% African American, 1.1% Native American, and 1.1% from two or more races. Hispanic or Latino of any race were 0.5% of the population.

There were 71 households, of which 31.0% had children under the age of 18 living with them, 52.1% were married couples living together, 12.7% had a female householder with no husband present, 5.6% had a male householder with no wife present, and 29.6% were non-families. 26.8% of all households were made up of individuals, and 14.1% had someone living alone who was 65 years of age or older. The average household size was 2.61 and the average family size was 3.10.

The median age in the village was 42.1 years. 23.2% of residents were under the age of 18; 4.4% were between the ages of 18 and 24; 28.2% were from 25 to 44; 25.3% were from 45 to 64; and 18.9% were 65 years of age or older. The gender makeup of the village was 50.3% male and 49.7% female.

=== 2000 census ===
As of the census of 2000, there were 181 people, 72 households, and 57 families living in the village. The population density was 954.5 inhabitants per square mile (368.5/km^{2}). There were 76 housing units at an average density of 400.8 per square mile (154.7/km^{2}). The racial makeup of the village was 96.13% White, 2.21% African American, and 1.66% from two or more races.

There were 72 households, out of which 30.6% had children under the age of 18 living with them, 65.3% were married couples living together, 8.3% had a female householder with no husband present, and 20.8% were non-families. 20.8% of all households were made up of individuals, and 5.6% had someone living alone who was 65 years of age or older. The average household size was 2.51 and the average family size was 2.84.

In the village, the population was spread out, with 22.1% under the age of 18, 7.2% from 18 to 24, 24.3% from 25 to 44, 26.5% from 45 to 64, and 19.9% who were 65 years of age or older. The median age was 44 years. For every 100 females, there were 110.5 males. For every 100 females age 18 and over, there were 104.3 males.

The median income for a household in the village was $36,250, and the median income for a family was $37,321. Males had a median income of $29,375 versus $19,286 for females. The per capita income for the village was $14,324. About 10.2% of families and 8.9% of the population were below the poverty line, including 12.1% of those under the age of eighteen and none of those 65 or over.

== Education ==
It is in the Excelsior Springs 40 School District.
