= Elmira, Missouri =

- Village
- Nickname: Elmira Bluejays
- Location of Elmira, Missouri
- Coordinates: 39°30′31″N 94°09′17″W
- Country: United States
- State: Missouri
- County: Ray

Area
  - Total: 0.073 sq mi (0.19 km^{2})
  - Land: 0.073 sq mi (0.19 km^{2})
  - Water: 0 sq mi (0.00 km^{2})
- Elevation: 942 ft (287 m)

Population (2020)
  - Total: 39
  - Density: 536.7/sq mi (207.22/km^{2})
- Time zone: UTC-6 (Central (CST))
  - Summer (DST): UTC-5 (CDT)
- ZIP code: 64062
- Area code: 816
- FIPS code: 29-22006
- GNIS feature ID: 2398814

Elmira is a village in northwest Ray County, Missouri, and part of the Kansas City metropolitan area within the United States. The population was 39 at the 2020 census.

== History ==
Elmira had its start as a mining settlement. The town site was platted in 1887. The village was named after Elmira, New York. A post office called Elmira was established in 1887, and remained in operation until 1959.

The Battle of Crooked River in the Mormon War was fought two miles southeast of the village.

Elmira resides in Ray County.

== Geography ==
According to the United States Census Bureau, the village has a total area of 0.07 square miles (0.18 km^{2}), all land.

== Demographics ==
Historical population
Census	Pop.	Note	%±
1930	187		—
1940	159		−15.0%
1950	128		−19.5%
1960	123		−3.9%
1970	124		0.8%
1980	109		−12.1%
1990	70		−35.8%
2000	82		17.1%
2010	50		−39.0%
2020	39		−22.0%
U.S. Decennial Census

=== 2010 census ===
As of the census of 2010, there were 50 people, 18 households, and 14 families residing in the village. The population density was 714.3 inhabitants per square mile (275.8/km^{2}). There were 22 housing units at an average density of 314.3 per square mile (121.4/km^{2}). The racial makeup of the village was 90.0% White, 2.0% from other races, and 8.0% from two or more races. Hispanic or Latino of any race were 8.0% of the population.

There were 18 households, of which 22.2% had children under the age of 18 living with them, 66.7% were married couples living together, 11.1% had a male householder with no wife present, and 22.2% were non-families. 22.2% of all households were made up of individuals, and 11.2% had someone living alone who was 65 years of age or older. The average household size was 2.78 and the average family size was 3.07.

The median age in the village was 47.5 years. 12% of residents were under the age of 18; 8% were between the ages of 18 and 24; 28% were from 25 to 44; 44% were from 45 to 64; and 8% were 65 years of age or older. The gender makeup of the village was 54.0% male and 46.0% female.

=== 2000 census ===
As of the census of 2000, there were 82 people, 29 households, and 22 families residing in the village. The population density was 331.3 inhabitants per square mile (127.9/km^{2}). There were 33 housing units at an average density of 133.3 per square mile (51.5/km^{2}). The racial makeup of the village was 93.90% White, 2.44% Native American, and 3.66% from two or more races.

There were 29 households, out of which 27.6% had children under the age of 18 living with them, 62.1% were married couples living together, 17.2% had a female householder with no husband present, and 20.7% were non-families. 13.8% of all households were made up of individuals, and 10.3% had someone living alone who was 65 years of age or older. The average household size was 2.83 and the average family size was 3.13.

In the village, the population was spread out, with 29.3% under the age of 18, 7.3% from 18 to 24, 31.7% from 25 to 44, 25.6% from 45 to 64, and 6.1% who were 65 years of age or older. The median age was 36 years. For every 100 females, there were 95.2 males. For every 100 females age 18 and over, there were 81.3 males.

The median income for a household in the village was $49,375, and the median income for a family was $50,833. Males had a median income of $40,625 versus $16,667 for females. The per capita income for the village was $14,785. There were 10.0% of families and 20.2% of the population living below the poverty line, including 29.4% of under eighteens and 50.0% of those over 64.

== Education ==
It is in the Lawson R-XIV School District.
