= Crystal Lakes, Missouri =

- City
- Location of Crystal Lakes, Missouri
- Coordinates: 39°21′39″N 94°11′15″W
- Country: United States
- State: Missouri
- County: Ray

Area
  - Total: 1.26 sq mi (3.26 km^{2})
  - Land: 1.10 sq mi (2.85 km^{2})
  - Water: 0.16 sq mi (0.41 km^{2})
- Elevation: 856 ft (261 m)

Population (2020)
  - Total: 390
  - Density: 354.4/sq mi (136.85/km^{2})
- Time zone: UTC-6 (Central (CST))
  - Summer (DST): UTC-5 (CDT)
- FIPS code: 29-17660
- GNIS feature ID: 2393688
- Website: cityofcrystallakes.org

Crystal Lakes is a city in western Ray County, Missouri, and part of the Kansas City metropolitan area within the United States. The population was 390 at the 2020 census.

== Geography ==
Crystal Lakes is located around a lake on the East Fork Fishing River just northeast of Excelsior Springs.

According to the United States Census Bureau, the city has a total area of 1.23 square miles (3.19 km^{2}), of which 1.07 square miles (2.77 km^{2}) is land and 0.16 square miles (0.41 km^{2}) is water.

== Demographics ==
Historical population
Census	Pop.	Note	%±
1990	255		—
2000	383		50.2%
2010	358		−6.5%
2020	390		8.9%
U.S. Decennial Census

=== 2010 census ===
As of the census of 2010, there were 358 people, 132 households, and 95 families living in the city. The population density was 334.6 inhabitants per square mile (129.2/km^{2}). There were 162 housing units at an average density of 151.4 per square mile (58.5/km^{2}). The racial makeup of the city was 93.6% White, 0.3% African American, 2.0% Native American, 2.0% Asian, and 2.2% from two or more races. Hispanic or Latino of any race were 1.4% of the population.

There were 132 households, of which 34.8% had children under the age of 18 living with them, 56.1% were married couples living together, 7.6% had a female householder with no husband present, 8.3% had a male householder with no wife present, and 28.0% were non-families. 20.5% of all households were made up of individuals, and 9.9% had someone living alone who was 65 years of age or older. The average household size was 2.71 and the average family size was 3.03.

The median age in the city was 39.6 years. 24.6% of residents were under the age of 18; 7.3% were between the ages of 18 and 24; 28.8% were from 25 to 44; 31.9% were from 45 to 64; and 7.5% were 65 years of age or older. The gender makeup of the city was 53.1% male and 46.9% female.

=== 2000 census ===
As of the census of 2000, there were 383 people, 133 households, and 109 families living in the city. The population density was 381.0 inhabitants per square mile (147.1/km^{2}). There were 154 housing units at an average density of 153.2 per square mile (59.2/km^{2}). The racial makeup of the city was 98.96% White, 0.26% Native American, 0.52% Asian, and 0.26% from two or more races. Hispanic or Latino of any race were 0.26% of the population.

There were 133 households, out of which 36.8% had children under the age of 18 living with them, 70.7% were married couples living together, 6.0% had a female householder with no husband present, and 18.0% were non-families. 14.3% of all households were made up of individuals, and 3.8% had someone living alone who was 65 years of age or older. The average household size was 2.88 and the average family size was 3.11.

In the city the population was spread out, with 27.2% under the age of 18, 7.3% from 18 to 24, 35.8% from 25 to 44, 22.7% from 45 to 64, and 7.0% who were 65 years of age or older. The median age was 36 years. For every 100 females there were 112.8 males. For every 100 females age 18 and over, there were 114.6 males.

The median income for a household in the city was $52,125, and the median income for a family was $54,063. Males had a median income of $36,818 versus $21,591 for females. The per capita income for the city was $20,288. About 2.7% of families and 2.9% of the population were below the poverty line, including 2.7% of those under age 18 and none of those age 65 or over.

== Education ==
It is in the Excelsior Springs 40 School District.
