= New Garden, Missouri =

Unincorporated community in Missouri, U.S.

Coordinates: 39°19′23″N 94°09′58″W

New Garden is an unincorporated community in Ray County, in the U.S. state of Missouri and part of the Kansas City metropolitan area.

== History ==
A post office called New Garden was established in 1851, and remained in operation until 1883. The community most likely took its name from a nearby church of the same name.
