= Lawson, Missouri =

City in Ray and Clay counties in Missouri, United States

- City
- Location of Lawson, Missouri
- Coordinates: 39°26′10″N 94°12′54″W
- Country: United States
- State: Missouri
- Counties: Ray and Clay

Area
  - Total: 3.05 sq mi (7.91 km^{2})
  - Land: 2.96 sq mi (7.67 km^{2})
  - Water: 0.093 sq mi (0.24 km^{2})
- Elevation: 1,034 ft (315 m)

Population (2020)
  - Total: 2,541
  - Density: 857.6/sq mi (331.12/km^{2})
- Time zone: UTC-6 (Central (CST))
  - Summer (DST): UTC-5 (CDT)
- ZIP code: 64062
- Area codes: 816, 975
- FIPS code: 29-40988
- GNIS feature ID: 2395650
- Website: lawsonmo.gov

Lawson is a city in Clay and Ray counties in Missouri, United States, that is part of the Kansas City metropolitan area. The population was 2,541 at the 2020 census.

== History ==
Lawson was founded in 1870 and was named for New York businessman L. M. Lawson. A post office called Lawson has been in operation since 1876.

Lawson is home to Ray County's oldest bank, Lawson Bank, founded in 1883. Interesting sites near Lawson include the historic Watkins Mill (now a Missouri state park and National Historic Landmark) and KC-10L, a Nike missile base, located a mile east of Lawson (Nov 1959 - Feb 1964).

== Geography ==
According to the United States Census Bureau, the city has a total area of 2.59 square miles (6.71 km^{2}), of which 2.53 square miles (6.55 km^{2}) is land and 0.06 square miles (0.16 km^{2}) is water.

== Demographics ==
Historical population
Census	Pop.	Note	%±
1880	223		—
1890	520		133.2%
1900	635		22.1%
1910	604		−4.9%
1920	545		−9.8%
1930	590		8.3%
1940	511		−13.4%
1950	486		−4.9%
1960	778		60.1%
1970	1,034		32.9%
1980	1,743		68.6%
1990	1,876		7.6%
2000	2,336		24.5%
2010	2,473		5.9%
2020	2,541		2.7%
U.S. Decennial Census

=== Racial and ethnic composition ===
Lawson city, Missouri – Racial and ethnic composition Note: the US Census treats Hispanic/Latino as an ethnic category. This table excludes Latinos from the racial categories and assigns them to a separate category. Hispanics/Latinos may be of any race.
Race / Ethnicity (NH = Non-Hispanic)	Pop 2000	Pop 2010	Pop 2020	% 2000	% 2010	% 2020
White alone (NH)	2,271	2,390	2,303	97.22%	96.64%	90.63%
Black or African American alone (NH)	7	3	7	0.30%	0.12%	0.28%
Native American or Alaska Native alone (NH)	3	17	10	0.13%	0.69%	0.39%
Asian alone (NH)	8	4	6	0.34%	0.16%	0.24%
Native Hawaiian or Pacific Islander alone (NH)	0	0	2	0.00%	0.00%	0.08%
Other race alone (NH)	2	0	3	0.09%	0.00%	0.12%
Mixed race or Multiracial (NH)	27	32	145	1.16%	1.29%	5.71%
Hispanic or Latino (any race)	18	27	65	0.77%	1.09%	2.56%
Total	2,336	2,473	2,541	100.00%	100.00%	100.00%

=== 2020 census ===
As of the 2020 census, Lawson had a population of 2,541. The median age was 34.9 years. 28.1% of residents were under the age of 18 and 16.6% of residents were 65 years of age or older. For every 100 females there were 90.8 males, and for every 100 females age 18 and over there were 89.6 males age 18 and over.

0.0% of residents lived in urban areas, while 100.0% lived in rural areas.

There were 895 households in Lawson, of which 40.8% had children under the age of 18 living in them. Of all households, 54.2% were married-couple households, 13.4% were households with a male householder and no spouse or partner present, and 24.9% were households with a female householder and no spouse or partner present. About 22.8% of all households were made up of individuals and 11.9% had someone living alone who was 65 years of age or older.

There were 969 housing units, of which 7.6% were vacant. The homeowner vacancy rate was 3.1% and the rental vacancy rate was 5.2%.

Racial composition as of the 2020 census
Race	Number	Percent
White	2,331	91.7%
Black or African American	7	0.3%
American Indian and Alaska Native	11	0.4%
Asian	6	0.2%
Native Hawaiian and Other Pacific Islander	2	0.1%
Some other race	12	0.5%
Two or more races	172	6.8%

=== 2010 census ===
As of the census of 2010, there were 2,473 people, 876 households, and 676 families living in the city. The population density was 977.5 inhabitants per square mile (377.4/km^{2}). There were 937 housing units at an average density of 370.4 units per square mile (143.0 units/km^{2}). The racial makeup of the city was 97.4% White, 0.1% African American, 0.7% Native American, 0.2% Asian, 0.2% from other races, and 1.4% from two or more races. Hispanic or Latino of any race were 1.1% of the population.

There were 876 households, of which 45.2% had children under the age of 18 living with them, 59.1% were married couples living together, 13.0% had a female householder with no husband present, 5.0% had a male householder with no wife present, and 22.8% were non-families. 20.7% of all households were made up of individuals, and 10.4% had someone living alone who was 65 years of age or older. The average household size was 2.79 and the average family size was 3.21.

The median age in the city was 33.1 years. 31.2% of residents were under the age of 18; 7.6% were between the ages of 18 and 24; 26.3% were from 25 to 44; 23.2% were from 45 to 64; and 11.8% were 65 years of age or older. The gender makeup of the city was 48.5% male and 51.5% female.

=== 2000 census ===
As of the census of 2000, there were 2,336 people, 818 households, and 624 families living in the city. The population density was 838.3 inhabitants per square mile (323.7/km^{2}). There were 852 housing units at an average density of 305.7 units per square mile (118.0 units/km^{2}). The racial makeup of the city was 97.65% White, 0.30% African American, 0.13% Native American, 0.39% Asian, 0.39% from other races, and 1.16% from two or more races. Hispanic or Latino of any race were 0.77% of the population.

There were 818 households, out of which 45.2% had children under the age of 18 living with them, 62.3% were married couples living together, 10.9% had a female householder with no husband present, and 23.7% were non-families. 21.8% of all households were made up of individuals, and 12.2% had someone living alone who was 65 years of age or older. The average household size was 2.80 and the average family size was 3.29.

In the city the population was spread out, with 32.7% under the age of 18, 7.9% from 18 to 24, 29.6% from 25 to 44, 17.6% from 45 to 64, and 12.2% who were 65 years of age or older. The median age was 32 years. For every 100 females, there were 93.2 males. For every 100 females age 18 and over, there were 84.6 males.

The median income for a household in the city was $41,875, and the median income for a family was $49,018. Males had a median income of $38,875 versus $22,273 for females. The per capita income for the city was $17,438. About 6.8% of families and 7.0% of the population were below the poverty line, including 8.1% of those under age 18 and 9.0% of those age 65 or over.

== Community and government ==
Lawson is a fourth-class city under Missouri statutes and has a governing body consisting of the Mayor and a four-member Board of Aldermen. Other decision-making bodies include: the Planning and Zoning Commission, the Board of Adjustment and the Parks Board. The City Hall staff includes a City Administrator, City Clerk, staff, and a Municipal Court Clerk. There is a Director of Public Works with a small staff.

The Chief of Police has seven officers. The City Attorney, Municipal Court Judge and Prosecutor serve on a contract basis.

Regarding recreation, in addition to Watkins Mill, there is an 18-hole golf course and the Lawson City Lake north of the city limits. Lawson also has a baseball/softball complex and a small city park.

== Education ==
Public education in Lawson is administered by Lawson R-XIV School District,. which operates one elementary school, one middle school, and Lawson High School.

Lawson has a public library, the Lawson Community Branch Library.

== See also ==
- List of cities in Missouri
