= Rayville, Missouri =

- Census-designated place
- Location of Rayville, Missouri
- Coordinates: 39°20′56″N 94°3′50″W
- Country: United States
- State: Missouri
- County: Ray

Area
  - Total: 0.33 sq mi (0.85 km^{2})
  - Land: 0.33 sq mi (0.85 km^{2})
  - Water: 0 sq mi (0.00 km^{2})
- Elevation: 981 ft (299 m)

Population (2020)
  - Total: 157
  - Density: 477.7/sq mi (184.43/km^{2})
- Time zone: UTC-6 (Central (CST))
  - Summer (DST): UTC-5 (CDT)
- ZIP code: 64084
- Area code: 816
- FIPS code: 29-60824
- GNIS feature ID: 2761657

Rayville is an unincorporated rural census-designated place (CDP) in Ray County, Missouri, United States. There is a post office at Rayville. The population was 157 at the 2020 census. It disincorporated in 2012.

== History ==
The post office at Rayville has been in operation since 1870. Rayville was platted in 1871. The community takes its name from Ray County.

== Geography ==
According to the United States Census Bureau, the village has a total area of 0.25 square miles (0.65 km^{2}), all land.

== Demographics ==
Historical population
Census	Pop.	Note	%±
2020	157		—
U.S. Decennial Census

=== 2010 census ===
As of the census of 2010, there were 223 people, 68 households, and 54 families living in the village. The population density was 892.0 inhabitants per square mile (344.4/km^{2}). There were 75 housing units at an average density of 300.0 per square mile (115.8/km^{2}). The racial makeup of the village was 97.3% White, 0.4% African American, and 2.2% from two or more races. Hispanic or Latino of any race were 1.3% of the population.

There were 68 households, of which 45.6% had children under the age of 18 living with them, 51.5% were married couples living together, 16.2% had a female householder with no husband present, 11.8% had a male householder with no wife present, and 20.6% were non-families. 19.1% of all households were made up of individuals, and 5.8% had someone living alone who was 65 years of age or older. The average household size was 3.28 and the average family size was 3.74.

The median age in the village was 30.5 years. 33.2% of residents were under the age of 18; 9.8% were between the ages of 18 and 24; 23.7% were from 25 to 44; 21.5% were from 45 to 64; and 11.7% were 65 years of age or older. The gender makeup of the village was 54.3% male and 45.7% female.

=== 2000 census ===
As of the census of 2000, there were 204 people, 72 households, and 55 families living in the village. The population density was 836.7 inhabitants per square mile (323.1/km^{2}). There were 82 housing units at an average density of 336.3 per square mile (129.8/km^{2}). The racial makeup of the village was 97.55% White, and 2.45% from two or more races.

There were 72 households, out of which 31.9% had children under the age of 18 living with them, 52.8% were married couples living together, 15.3% had a female householder with no husband present, and 23.6% were non-families. 15.3% of all households were made up of individuals, and 9.7% had someone living alone who was 65 years of age or older. The average household size was 2.83 and the average family size was 3.15.

In the village, the population was spread out, with 23.5% under the age of 18, 14.2% from 18 to 24, 25.5% from 25 to 44, 23.5% from 45 to 64, and 13.2% who were 65 years of age or older. The median age was 37 years. For every 100 females, there were 94.3 males. For every 100 females age 18 and over, there were 113.7 males.

The median income for a household in the village was $32,750, and the median income for a family was $35,000. Males had a median income of $31,250 versus $18,125 for females. The per capita income for the village was $12,769. About 15.5% of families and 15.6% of the population were below the poverty line, including 10.9% of those under the age of eighteen and 3.2% of those 65 or over.

== Education ==
It is in the Richmond R-XVI School District.
