= Excelsior Estates, Missouri =

City in Missouri, U.S.

- City
- Location of Excelsior Estates, Missouri
- Coordinates: 39°23′24″N 94°12′30″W
- Country: United States
- State: Missouri
- Counties: Ray, Clay

Area
  - Total: 0.24 sq mi (0.62 km^{2})
  - Land: 0.24 sq mi (0.62 km^{2})
  - Water: 0 sq mi (0.00 km^{2})
- Elevation: 1,017 ft (310 m)

Population (2020)
  - Total: 209
  - Density: 868.5/sq mi (335.34/km^{2})
- Time zone: UTC-6 (Central (CST))
  - Summer (DST): UTC-5 (CDT)
- ZIP code: 64024
- Area code: 816
- FIPS code: 29-23077
- GNIS feature ID: 2398849

Excelsior Estates is a city in Clay and Ray counties in the U.S. state of Missouri and part of the Kansas City metropolitan area. The population was 209 at the 2020 census.

== Geography ==
According to the United States Census Bureau, the city has a total area of 0.24 square miles (0.62 km^{2}), all land.

== Demographics ==
Historical population
Census	Pop.	Note	%±
1990	274		—
2000	263		−4.0%
2010	147		−44.1%
2020	209		42.2%
U.S. Decennial Census

=== Racial and ethnic composition ===
Excelsior Estates village, Missouri – Racial and ethnic composition Note: the US Census treats Hispanic/Latino as an ethnic category. This table excludes Latinos from the racial categories and assigns them to a separate category. Hispanics/Latinos may be of any race.
Race / Ethnicity (NH = Non-Hispanic)	Pop 2000	Pop 2010	Pop 2020	% 2000	% 2010	% 2020
White alone (NH)	250	131	169	95.06%	89.12%	80.86%
Black or African American alone (NH)	2	0	0	0.76%	0.00%	0.00%
Native American or Alaska Native alone (NH)	2	3	10	0.76%	2.04%	4.78%
Asian alone (NH)	0	0	2	0.00%	0.00%	0.96%
Native Hawaiian or Pacific Islander alone (NH)	0	0	0	0.00%	0.00%	0.00%
Other race alone (NH)	0	0	1	0.00%	0.00%	0.48%
Mixed race or Multiracial (NH)	1	4	15	0.38%	2.72%	7.18%
Hispanic or Latino (any race)	8	9	12	3.04%	6.12%	5.74%
Total	263	147	209	100.00%	100.00%	100.00%

=== 2010 census ===
As of the census of 2010, there were 147 people, 57 households, and 35 families living in the village. The population density was 612.5 inhabitants per square mile (236.5/km^{2}). There were 91 housing units at an average density of 379.2 per square mile (146.4/km^{2}). The racial makeup of the village was 93.9% White, 2.0% Native American, and 4.1% from two or more races. Hispanic or Latino of any race were 6.1% of the population.

There were 57 households, of which 33.3% had children under the age of 18 living with them, 45.6% were married couples living together, 8.8% had a female householder with no husband present, 7.0% had a male householder with no wife present, and 38.6% were non-families. 31.6% of all households were made up of individuals, and 7.1% had someone living alone who was 65 years of age or older. The average household size was 2.58 and the average family size was 3.34.

The median age in the village was 38.9 years. 26.5% of residents were under the age of 18; 8.1% were between the ages of 18 and 24; 23.8% were from 25 to 44; 31.3% were from 45 to 64; and 10.2% were 65 years of age or older. The gender makeup of the village was 52.4% male and 47.6% female.

=== 2000 census ===
As of the census of 2000, there were 263 people, 95 households, and 66 families living in the village. The population density was 1,173.1 inhabitants per square mile (452.9/km^{2}). There were 111 housing units at an average density of 495.1 per square mile (191.2/km^{2}). The racial makeup of the village was 95.44% White, 0.76% African American, 0.76% Native American, 2.66% from other races, and 0.38% from two or more races. Hispanic or Latino of any race were 3.04% of the population.

There were 95 households, out of which 44.2% had children under the age of 18 living with them, 51.6% were married couples living together, 12.6% had a female householder with no husband present, and 30.5% were non-families. 28.4% of all households were made up of individuals, and 6.3% had someone living alone who was 65 years of age or older. The average household size was 2.77 and the average family size was 3.27.

In the city the population was spread out, with 35.0% under the age of 18, 4.2% from 18 to 24, 36.5% from 25 to 44, 18.6% from 45 to 64, and 5.7% who were 65 years of age or older. The median age was 32 years. For every 100 females, there were 99.2 males. For every 100 females age 18 and over, there were 98.8 males.

The median income for a household in the city was $26,667, and the median income for a family was $26,563. Males had a median income of $38,125 versus $15,500 for females. The per capita income for the city was $13,286. About 15.4% of families and 16.9% of the population were below the poverty line, including 20.5% of those under the age of eighteen and none of those 65 or over.

== Education ==
It is in the Excelsior Springs 40 School District.
