= Prathersville, Missouri =

- Village
- Location of Prathersville, Missouri
- Coordinates: 39°18′55″N 94°16′26″W
- Country: United States
- State: Missouri
- County: Clay

Area
  - Total: 2.25 sq mi (5.83 km^{2})
  - Land: 2.25 sq mi (5.83 km^{2})
  - Water: 0 sq mi (0.00 km^{2})
- Elevation: 768 ft (234 m)

Population (2020)
  - Total: 121
  - Density: 53.7/sq mi (20.75/km^{2})
- Time zone: UTC-6 (Central (CST))
  - Summer (DST): UTC-5 (CDT)
- FIPS code: 29-59816
- GNIS feature ID: 2399021

Prathersville is a village in Clay County, Missouri, United States. The population was 121 at the 2020 census. It is part of the Kansas City metropolitan area.

== History ==
A post office called Prathersville was established in 1876, and remained in operation until 1904. The village was named after J. A. Prather, the proprietor of a local mill.

== Geography ==
According to the United States Census Bureau, the village has a total area of 2.26 square miles (5.85 km^{2}), all land.

== Demographics ==
Historical population
Census	Pop.	Note	%±
1880	70		—
1960	148		—
1970	153		3.4%
1980	141		−7.8%
1990	130		−7.8%
2000	111		−14.6%
2010	124		11.7%
2020	121		−2.4%
U.S. Decennial Census

=== Racial and ethnic composition ===
Prathersville village, Missouri – Racial and ethnic composition Note: the US Census treats Hispanic/Latino as an ethnic category. This table excludes Latinos from the racial categories and assigns them to a separate category. Hispanics/Latinos may be of any race.
Race / Ethnicity (NH = Non-Hispanic)	Pop 2000	Pop 2010	Pop 2020	% 2000	% 2010	% 2020
White alone (NH)	109	117	117	98.20%	94.35%	96.69%
Black or African American alone (NH)	0	0	0	0.00%	0.00%	0.00%
Native American or Alaska Native alone (NH)	0	2	0	0.00%	1.61%	0.00%
Asian alone (NH)	0	1	0	0.00%	0.81%	0.00%
Native Hawaiian or Pacific Islander alone (NH)	0	0	0	0.00%	0.00%	0.00%
Other race alone (NH)	0	0	0	0.00%	0.00%	0.00%
Mixed race or Multiracial (NH)	2	1	4	1.80%	0.81%	3.31%
Hispanic or Latino (any race)	0	3	0	0.00%	2.42%	0.00%
Total	111	124	121	100.00%	100.00%	100.00%

=== 2010 census ===
As of the census of 2010, there were 124 people, 56 households, and 34 families living in the village. The population density was 54.9 inhabitants per square mile (21.2/km^{2}). There were 61 housing units at an average density of 27.0 per square mile (10.4/km^{2}). The racial makeup of the village was 95.2% White, 1.6% Native American, 0.8% Asian, 0.8% from other races, and 1.6% from two or more races. Hispanic or Latino of any race were 2.4% of the population.

There were 56 households, of which 21.4% had children under the age of 18 living with them, 58.9% were married couples living together, 1.8% had a female householder with no husband present, and 39.3% were non-families. 35.7% of all households were made up of individuals, and 21.4% had someone living alone who was 65 years of age or older. The average household size was 2.21 and the average family size was 2.88.

The median age in the village was 51.3 years. 15.3% of residents were under the age of 18; 4.8% were between the ages of 18 and 24; 19.4% were from 25 to 44; 44.5% were from 45 to 64; and 16.1% were 65 years of age or older. The gender makeup of the village was 50.8% male and 49.2% female.

=== 2000 census ===
As of the census of 2000, there were 111 people, 47 households, and 33 families living in the village. The population density was 49.6 inhabitants per square mile (19.2/km^{2}). There were 51 housing units at an average density of 22.8 per square mile (8.8/km^{2}). The racial makeup of the village was 98.20% White, and 1.80% from two or more races.

There were 47 households, out of which 29.8% had children under the age of 18 living with them, 70.2% were married couples living together, and 27.7% were non-families. 25.5% of all households were made up of individuals, and 17.0% had someone living alone who was 65 years of age or older. The average household size was 2.36 and the average family size was 2.79.

In the village, the population was spread out, with 19.8% under the age of 18, 8.1% from 18 to 24, 29.7% from 25 to 44, 19.8% from 45 to 64, and 22.5% who were 65 years of age or older. The median age was 42 years. For every 100 females, there were 98.2 males. For every 100 females age 18 and over, there were 89.4 males.

The median income for a household in the village was $34,063, and the median income for a family was $37,500. Males had a median income of $47,917 versus $28,125 for females. The per capita income for the village was $20,745. There were no families and 4.0% of the population living below the poverty line, including no under eighteens and 5.1% of those over 64.

== Education ==
It is in the Excelsior Springs 40 School District.
