= Orrick Township, Ray County, Missouri =

Inactive township in the US state of Missouri

Coordinates: 39°13′12″N 94°08′41″W

Orrick Township is an inactive township in Ray County, in the U.S. state of Missouri. It is part of the Kansas City metropolitan area.

== History ==
Orrick Township was founded in 1886, taking its name from the town of Orrick, Missouri.
