= Wood Heights, Missouri =

- City
- Location of Wood Heights, Missouri
- Coordinates: 39°20′29″N 94°09′49″W
- Country: United States
- State: Missouri
- County: Ray

Area
  - Total: 2.29 sq mi (5.92 km^{2})
  - Land: 2.28 sq mi (5.91 km^{2})
  - Water: 0.0077 sq mi (0.02 km^{2})
- Elevation: 1,056 ft (322 m)

Population (2020)
  - Total: 757
  - Density: 332.0/sq mi (128.19/km^{2})
- Time zone: UTC-6 (Central (CST))
  - Summer (DST): UTC-5 (CDT)
- ZIP code: 64024
- Area codes: 816 and 975
- FIPS code: 29-80908
- GNIS feature ID: 2397361
- Website: https://woodheights-mo.gov/

Wood Heights is a city in western Ray County, Missouri, and part of the Kansas City metropolitan area within the United States. The population was 757 at the 2020 census.

== Geography ==
According to the United States Census Bureau, the city has a total area of 2.29 square miles (5.93 km^{2}), of which 2.28 square miles (5.91 km^{2}) is land and 0.01 square miles (0.03 km^{2}) is water.

== Demographics ==
Historical population
Census	Pop.	Note	%±
1960	107		—
1970	362		238.3%
1980	747		106.4%
1990	708		−5.2%
2000	742		4.8%
2010	717		−3.4%
2020	757		5.6%
U.S. Decennial Census

=== 2010 census ===
At the 2010 census there were 717 people in 257 households, including 200 families, in the city. The population density was 314.5 inhabitants per square mile (121.4/km^{2}). There were 274 housing units at an average density of 120.2 per square mile (46.4/km^{2}). The racial makup of the city was 96.7% White, 1.5% African American, 0.1% Native American, 0.4% from other races, and 1.3% from two or more races. Hispanic or Latino of any race were 2.1%.

Of the 257 households, 38.1% had children under the age of 18 living with them, 66.5% were married couples living together, 7.4% had a female householder with no husband present, 3.9% had a male householder with no wife present, and 22.2% were non-families. 17.9% of households were one person, and 7% were one person aged 65 or older. The average household size was 2.79 and the average family size was 3.16.

The median age was 38.6 years. 28.3% of residents were under the age of 18; 7.5% were between the ages of 18 and 24; 23.3% were from 25 to 44; 28.2% were from 45 to 64; and 12.8% were 65 or older. The gender makeup of the city was 49.4% male and 50.6% female.

=== 2000 census ===
At the 2000 census there were 742 people in 248 households, including 213 families, in the city. The population density was 329.8 inhabitants per square mile (127.3/km^{2}). There were 260 housing units at an average density of 115.6 per square mile (44.6/km^{2}). The racial makup of the city was 98.11% White, 0.67% African American, 0.13% Native American, 0.13% Pacific Islander, 0.13% from other races, and 0.81% from two or more races. Hispanic or Latino of any race were 2.70%.

Of the 248 households, 41.9% had children under the age of 18 living with them, 76.2% were married couples living together, 6.0% had a female householder with no husband present, and 14.1% were non-families. 12.9% of households were one person, and 7.7% were one person aged 65 or older. The average household size was 2.99 and the average family size was 3.26.

In the city the population was spread out, with 31.0% under the age of 18, 7.1% from 18 to 24, 27.6% from 25 to 44, 24.8% from 45 to 64, and 9.4% 65 or older. The median age was 35 years. For every 100 females there were 109.0 males. For every 100 females age 18 and over, there were 108.1 males.

The median household income was $51,250 and the median family income was $53,393. Males had a median income of $35,865 versus $24,531 for females. The per capita income for the city was $18,120. About 1.4% of families and 2.2% of the population were below the poverty line, including none of those under age 18 and 13.3% of those age 65 or over.

== Name ==
While the city's official name is "Wood Heights", it is also known as "Woods Heights", the name with which it was recorded by the 2000 census. The origin of the town name comes from Robert "Woodson" Hite, cousin to Jesse James. "Wood" Hite was shot dead by Robert Ford, also assassin of Jesse James.

== Education ==
It is in the Excelsior Springs 40 School District.
