= Knoxville, Missouri =

Unincorporated rural village in the US state of Missouri

Coordinates: 39°26′46″N 94°01′01″W

Knoxville is an unincorporated community in north central Ray County, in the U.S. state of Missouri and part of the Kansas City metropolitan area.

The community is at the intersection of Missouri Route 13 and Missouri Route HH. Richmond is eleven miles to the south and the Ray-Caldwell county line is five miles to the north. The Crooked River flows past about two miles west of the community and the Crooked River Conservation Area is three miles southwest of the community.

== History ==
Knoxville was founded in the 1830s. Laid out in 1837 by John Graves of Tennessee, it was originally named Buncombe on January 24, 1838. Buncombe was selected because some of the settlers came from Buncombe County, North Carolina; however, the name was soon changed—a large share of the early settlers being natives of Tennessee caused the name of Knoxville, after Knoxville, Tennessee, to be selected. A post office called Knoxville was established in 1838, and remained in operation until 1904.

When Caldwell County, just north of Ray County, was created by the Missouri Legislature in 1836 as a settlement area for the Latter-day Saints, or Mormons, a six-mile-wide strip of east–west-running land, known as Buncombe's Strip, became a topic of debate. Named for Buncombe, now Knoxville, this area had been designated by an 1825 law as belonging to any future county created north of Ray County. The Mormons generally agreed to avoid settling this area; in January 1839, following the Mormon War, the legislature moved this strip into Ray County.
