= Fleming, Missouri =

- City
- Location of Fleming, Missouri
- Coordinates: 39°11′44″N 94°03′07″W
- Country: United States
- State: Missouri
- County: Ray
- Incorporated: 1962

Area
  - Total: 0.54 sq mi (1.40 km^{2})
  - Land: 0.54 sq mi (1.40 km^{2})
  - Water: 0 sq mi (0.00 km^{2})
- Elevation: 745 ft (227 m)

Population (2020)
  - Total: 114
  - Density: 211.2/sq mi (81.55/km^{2})
- Time zone: UTC-6 (Central (CST))
  - Summer (DST): UTC-5 (CDT)
- FIPS code: 29-24562
- GNIS feature ID: 2394769

Fleming is a village in Ray County, Missouri, and part of the Kansas City metropolitan area within the United States. The population was 114 at the 2020 census.

== History ==
A post office called Fleming was established in 1888, and remained in operation until 1905. The community has the name of Alfred Walton Fleming, a businessperson in the local mining industry.

== Geography ==
According to the United States Census Bureau, the city has a total area of 0.54 square miles (1.40 km^{2}), all land.

== Demographics ==
Historical population
Census	Pop.	Note	%±
1940	5,401		—
1950	5,308		−1.7%
1960	4,515		−14.9%
1970	152		−96.6%
1980	144		−5.3%
1990	130		−9.7%
2000	122		−6.2%
2010	128		4.9%
2020	114		−10.9%
U.S. Decennial Census

=== 2010 census ===
As of the census of 2010, there were 128 people, 51 households, and 40 families living in the city. The population density was 237.0 inhabitants per square mile (91.5/km^{2}). There were 62 housing units at an average density of 114.8 per square mile (44.3/km^{2}). The racial makeup of the city was 98.4% White and 1.6% Native American. Hispanic or Latino of any race were 0.8% of the population.

There were 51 households, of which 33.3% had children under the age of 18 living with them, 60.8% were married couples living together, 13.7% had a female householder with no husband present, 3.9% had a male householder with no wife present, and 21.6% were non-families. 19.6% of all households were made up of individuals, and 7.8% had someone living alone who was 65 years of age or older. The average household size was 2.51 and the average family size was 2.85.

The median age in the city was 40 years. 25.8% of residents were under the age of 18; 9.4% were between the ages of 18 and 24; 23.4% were from 25 to 44; 31.3% were from 45 to 64; and 10.2% were 65 years of age or older. The gender makeup of the city was 46.1% male and 53.9% female.

=== 2000 census ===
As of the census of 2000, there were 122 people, 47 households, and 33 families living in the city. The population density was 225.6 inhabitants per square mile (87.1/km^{2}). There were 48 housing units at an average density of 88.8 per square mile (34.3/km^{2}). The racial makeup of the city was 98.36% White, and 1.64% from two or more races.

There were 47 households, out of which 38.3% had children under the age of 18 living with them, 61.7% were married couples living together, 10.6% had a female householder with no husband present, and 27.7% were non-families. 23.4% of all households were made up of individuals, and 8.5% had someone living alone who was 65 years of age or older. The average household size was 2.60 and the average family size was 3.06.

In the city the population was spread out, with 25.4% under the age of 18, 4.9% from 18 to 24, 31.1% from 25 to 44, 24.6% from 45 to 64, and 13.9% who were 65 years of age or older. The median age was 38 years. For every 100 females there were 103.3 males. For every 100 females age 18 and over, there were 97.8 males.

The median income for a household in the city was $35,625, and the median income for a family was $60,625. Males had a median income of $47,500 versus $22,500 for females. The per capita income for the city was $15,697. There were 3.1% of families and 11.2% of the population living below the poverty line, including 12.8% of under eighteens and 30.0% of those over 64.

== Education ==
Most of it is in the Orrick R-XI School District while a piece is in the Richmond R-XVI School District.
