= Hardin, Missouri =

- City
- Location of Hardin, Missouri
- Coordinates: 39°16′03″N 93°49′53″W
- Country: United States
- State: Missouri
- County: Ray
- Incorporated: 1888

Area
  - Total: 0.64 sq mi (1.67 km^{2})
  - Land: 0.64 sq mi (1.67 km^{2})
  - Water: 0 sq mi (0.00 km^{2})
- Elevation: 692 ft (211 m)

Population (2020)
  - Total: 571
  - Density: 888/sq mi (342.9/km^{2})
- Time zone: UTC-6 (Central (CST))
  - Summer (DST): UTC-5 (CDT)
- ZIP code: 64035
- Area code: 660
- FIPS code: 29-30322
- GNIS feature ID: 2394294
- Website: City website

Hardin is a city in southeast Ray County, Missouri, and part of the Kansas City metropolitan area within the United States. The population was 571 at the 2020 census.

== History ==
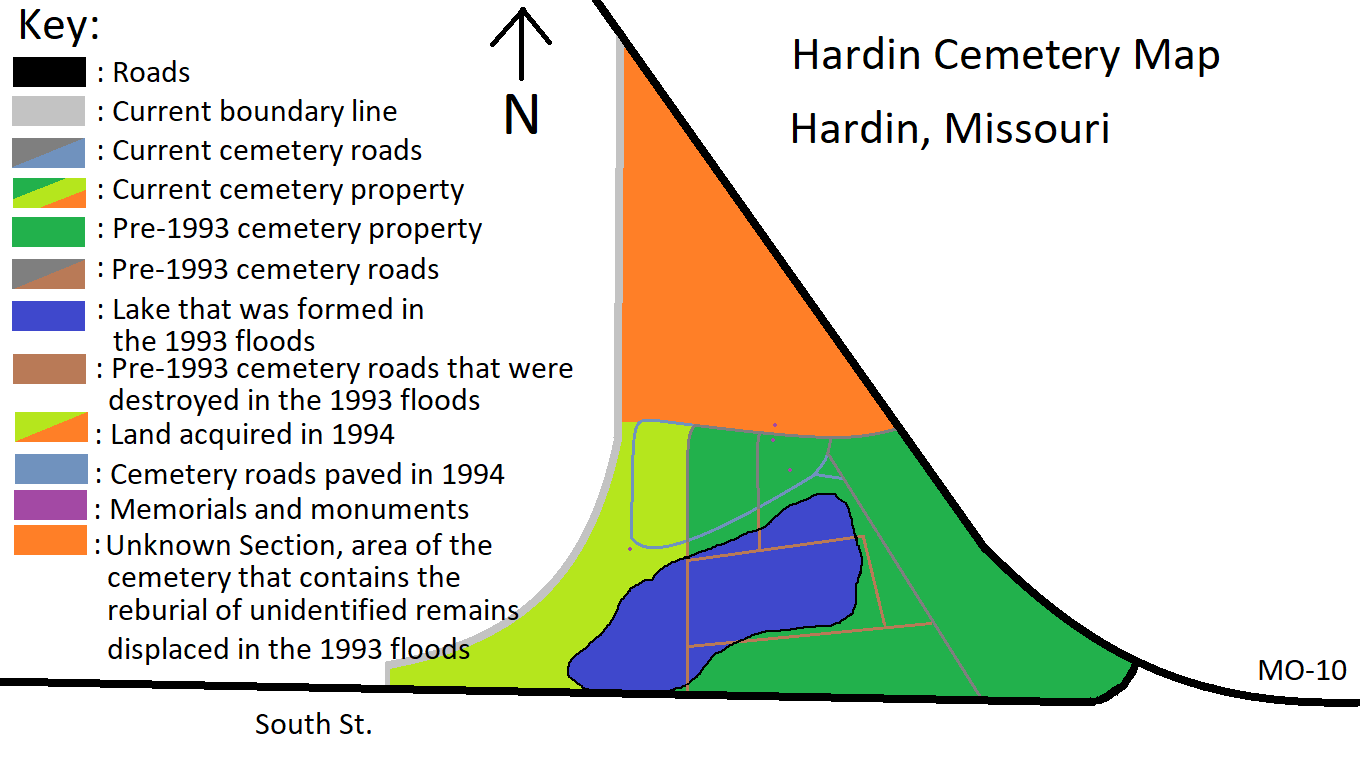
Map diagram of Hardin Cemetery

Hardin was laid out in 1868. The community was named for Charles Henry Hardin, 22nd Governor of Missouri. A post office called Hardin has been in operation since 1858.

=== 1993 floods ===
Hardin and its cemetery were affected by the Great Flood of 1993, due to their location near the Missouri River. On July 12, 1993 a levee protecting the town of Hardin broke, flooding the city and the cemetery. The flood waters cut a pond thru the cemetery and swept away 793 burials. Later, under the leadership of Dean Snow, 645 remains were recovered, but most were unidentified. Some were still inside their vaults or caskets (thus helping making identification easier), while others were scattered in the open. Since DNA testing was still in its infancy, bodies and bones had to be identified by the rate of decay, sex, age range, dental records and family recollections. Of the bodies recovered, only 120 were identified and reburied with their original headstones. The remaining 525 bodies were unidentified. Some had decayed to the point that they were unrecognizable, others were too old to have any surviving records or relatives. The unidentified bodies were reburied in a mass grave in part of a 9.5 acre plot of land that was purchased by the cemetery after the 1993 flood. The unidentified were marked with a headstone listing them as unknown and a number, so in case the bodies were to be disturbed again by another flood or if authorities wanted to try to identify them with newer technology or DNA testing in the future. A memorial was added to the western entrance of the cemetery in 1994 to honor the 1993 flood and the unidentified bodies. Part of the newly acquired acre of land was also used to display the recovered headstones of those whose bodies were not identified. They today function as a Cenotaph for the unidentified bodies so living family members can still pay respects. The rest was used to rebury the 120 identified bodies and for new burials. In 1995, a second memorial was added near the mass grave displaying the names, birth and death years of the displaced bodies that could not be identified. Today, the cemetery is 18.5 acres large, including the pond.

== Geography ==
According to the United States Census Bureau, the city has a total area of 0.64 square miles (1.66 km^{2}), all land.

== Demographics ==
Historical population
Census	Pop.	Note	%±
1880	247		—
1890	656		165.6%
1900	669		2.0%
1910	635		−5.1%
1920	847		33.4%
1930	821		−3.1%
1940	805		−1.9%
1950	747		−7.2%
1960	727		−2.7%
1970	683		−6.1%
1980	688		0.7%
1990	598		−13.1%
2000	614		2.7%
2010	569		−7.3%
2020	571		0.4%
U.S. Decennial Census

=== 2010 census ===
As of the census of 2010, there were 569 people, 214 households, and 159 families living in the city. The population density was 889.1 inhabitants per square mile (343.3/km^{2}). There were 266 housing units at an average density of 415.6 per square mile (160.5/km^{2}). The racial makeup of the city was 98.1% White, 1.1% Native American, 0.2% Asian, and 0.7% from two or more races. Hispanic or Latino of any race were 1.6% of the population.

There were 214 households, of which 38.8% had children under the age of 18 living with them, 54.7% were married couples living together, 13.6% had a female householder with no husband present, 6.1% had a male householder with no wife present, and 25.7% were non-families. 21.5% of all households were made up of individuals, and 8.8% had someone living alone who was 65 years of age or older. The average household size was 2.66 and the average family size was 3.04.

The median age in the city was 35.8 years. 28.3% of residents were under the age of 18; 8.5% were between the ages of 18 and 24; 25.5% were from 25 to 44; 27.3% were from 45 to 64; and 10.4% were 65 years of age or older. The gender makeup of the city was 49.0% male and 51.0% female.

=== 2000 census ===
As of the census of 2000, there were 614 people, 247 households, and 170 families living in the city. The population density was 992.0 inhabitants per square mile (383.0/km^{2}). There were 267 housing units at an average density of 431.4 per square mile (166.6/km^{2}). The racial makeup of the city was 97.39% White, 0.16% African American, 1.14% Native American, 0.16% Asian, 0.33% from other races, and 0.81% from two or more races. Hispanic or Latino of any race were 0.33% of the population.

There were 247 households, out of which 34.4% had children under the age of 18 living with them, 56.7% were married couples living together, 7.7% had a female householder with no husband present, and 30.8% were non-families. 27.5% of all households were made up of individuals, and 17.8% had someone living alone who was 65 years of age or older. The average household size was 2.49 and the average family size was 3.04.

In the city the population was spread out, with 28.5% under the age of 18, 8.6% from 18 to 24, 28.0% from 25 to 44, 19.7% from 45 to 64, and 15.1% who were 65 years of age or older. The median age was 36 years. For every 100 females there were 102.0 males. For every 100 females age 18 and over, there were 96.0 males.

The median income for a household in the city was $35,000, and the median income for a family was $40,729. Males had a median income of $30,809 versus $17,500 for females. The per capita income for the city was $14,676. About 7.9% of families and 6.1% of the population were below the poverty line, including 3.5% of those under age 18 and 11.3% of those age 65 or over.

== Education ==
- Hardin-Central School District - preschool, elementary, and high school
