= Henrietta, Missouri =

- City
- Location of Henrietta, Missouri
- Coordinates: 39°14′13″N 93°56′18″W
- Country: United States
- State: Missouri
- County: Ray
- Incorporated: 1874

Area
  - Total: 0.59 sq mi (1.54 km^{2})
  - Land: 0.59 sq mi (1.54 km^{2})
  - Water: 0 sq mi (0.00 km^{2})
- Elevation: 705 ft (215 m)

Population (2020)
  - Total: 278
  - Density: 466.1/sq mi (179.97/km^{2})
- Time zone: UTC-6 (Central (CST))
  - Summer (DST): UTC-5 (CDT)
- ZIP code: 64036
- Area codes: 816, 975
- FIPS code: 29-31654
- GNIS feature ID: 2394353
- Website: cityofhenrietta.org

Henrietta is a city in southern Ray County, Missouri, and part of the Kansas City metropolitan area within the United States. The population was 278 at the 2020 census.

== History ==
Henrietta was platted in 1868, and named after Henrietta Watkins, the wife of a first settler. A variant name was "Henry". A post office called Henry was established in 1869, and the name was changed to Henrietta in 1908.

== Geography ==
Henrietta is 27 miles (43 km) east of Independence and 35 miles (56 km) east of Kansas City. Henrietta is part of the Kansas City metropolitan area.

According to the United States Census Bureau, the city has a total area of 0.60 square miles (1.55 km^{2}), all land.

== Demographics ==
Historical population
Census	Pop.	Note	%±
1890	315		—
1900	385		22.2%
1910	443		15.1%
1920	630		42.2%
1930	632		0.3%
1940	544		−13.9%
1950	462		−15.1%
1960	497		7.6%
1970	466		−6.2%
1980	424		−9.0%
1990	412		−2.8%
2000	457		10.9%
2010	369		−19.3%
2020	278		−24.7%
U.S. Decennial Census

=== 2010 census ===
As of the census of 2010, there were 369 people, 109 households, and 75 families living in the city. The population density was 615.0 inhabitants per square mile (237.5/km^{2}). There were 141 housing units at an average density of 235.0 per square mile (90.7/km^{2}). The racial makeup of the city was 93.5% White, 5.4% African American, 0.5% Native American, 0.3% from other races, and 0.3% from two or more races. Hispanic or Latino of any race were 4.6% of the population.

There were 109 households, of which 34.9% had children under the age of 18 living with them, 43.1% were married couples living together, 17.4% had a female householder with no husband present, 8.3% had a male householder with no wife present, and 31.2% were non-families. 22.9% of all households were made up of individuals, and 7.4% had someone living alone who was 65 years of age or older. The average household size was 2.64 and the average family size was 3.03.

The median age in the city was 37.1 years. 21.4% of residents were under the age of 18; 11.9% were between the ages of 18 and 24; 29.5% were from 25 to 44; 27.1% were from 45 to 64; and 10% were 65 years of age or older. The gender makeup of the city was 55.8% male and 44.2% female.

=== 2000 census ===
As of the census of 2000, there were 457 people, 124 households, and 83 families living in the city. The population density was 765.0 inhabitants per square mile (295.4/km^{2}). There were 149 housing units at an average density of 249.4 per square mile (96.3/km^{2}). The racial makeup of the city was 88.62% White, 7.00% African American, 0.66% Native American, 2.19% from other races, and 1.53% from two or more races. Hispanic or Latino of any race were 3.28% of the population.

There were 124 households, out of which 35.5% had children under the age of 18 living with them, 51.6% were married couples living together, 9.7% had a female householder with no husband present, and 32.3% were non-families. 27.4% of all households were made up of individuals, and 7.3% had someone living alone who was 65 years of age or older. The average household size was 2.69 and the average family size was 3.30.

In the city the population was spread out, with 21.4% under the age of 18, 16.0% from 18 to 24, 37.0% from 25 to 44, 16.4% from 45 to 64, and 9.2% who were 65 years of age or older. The median age was 30 years. For every 100 females there were 153.9 males. For every 100 females age 18 and over, there were 182.7 males.

The median income for a household in the city was $33,750, and the median income for a family was $40,357. Males had a median income of $29,432 versus $24,500 for females. The per capita income for the city was $16,129. About 6.0% of families and 11.3% of the population were below the poverty line, including 13.8% of those under age 18 and none of those age 65 or over.

== Education ==
It is in the Richmond R-XVI School District.
