= Ray County, Missouri =

County in Missouri, United States

- County
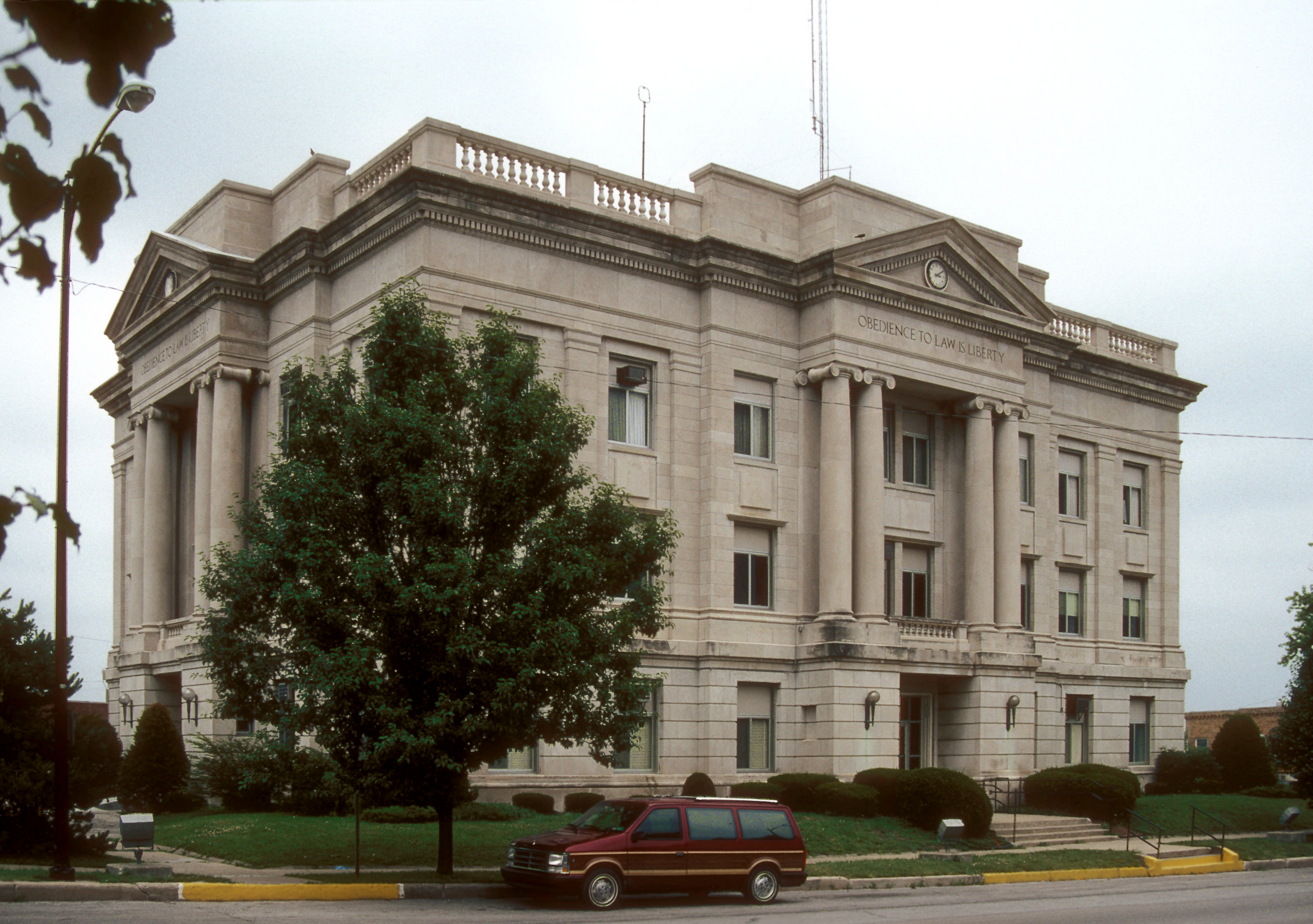
- Ray County Courthouse

- Location within the U.S. state of Missouri
- Coordinates: 39°21′N 93°59′W
- Country: United States
- State: Missouri
- Founded: November 16, 1820
- Named for: John Ray, Missouri state legislator
- Seat: Richmond
- Largest city: Richmond

Area
  - Total: 574 sq mi (1,490 km^{2})
  - Land: 569 sq mi (1,470 km^{2})
  - Water: 5.1 sq mi (13 km^{2}) 0.9%

Population (2020)
  - Total: 23,158
  - Estimate (2025): 23,398 ▲
  - Density: 40.7/sq mi (15.7/km^{2})
- Time zone: UTC−6 (Central)
  - Summer (DST): UTC−5 (CDT)
- Congressional district: 5th
- Website: raycountymo.com

Ray County is a county located in the northwestern portion of the U.S. state of Missouri and is part of the Kansas City metropolitan area. As of the 2020 census, the population was 23,158. Its county seat is Richmond. The county was organized November 16, 1820, and named for John Ray, a Missouri state legislator and member of the first state Constitutional Convention.

== Geography ==
According to the U.S. Census Bureau, the county has a total area of 574 square miles (1,490 km^{2}), of which 569 square miles (1,470 km^{2}) is land and 5.4 square miles (14 km^{2}) (0.9%) is water.

=== Adjacent counties ===
- Caldwell County (north)
- Carroll County (east)
- Lafayette County (south)
- Jackson County (southwest)
- Clay County (west)
- Clinton County (northwest)

=== Major highways ===
- Route 10
- Route 13
- Route 210

=== National protected area ===
- Big Muddy National Fish and Wildlife Refuge (part)

== Demographics ==
Historical population
Census	Pop.	Note	%±
1830	2,657		—
1840	6,553		146.6%
1850	10,373		58.3%
1860	14,092		35.9%
1870	18,700		32.7%
1880	20,190		8.0%
1890	24,215		19.9%
1900	24,805		2.4%
1910	21,451		−13.5%
1920	20,508		−4.4%
1930	19,846		−3.2%
1940	18,584		−6.4%
1950	15,932		−14.3%
1960	16,075		0.9%
1970	17,599		9.5%
1980	21,378		21.5%
1990	21,971		2.8%
2000	23,354		6.3%
2010	23,494		0.6%
2020	23,158		−1.4%
2025 (est.)	23,398	▲	1.0%
U.S. Decennial Census; 1790-1960 1900-1990; 1990-2000 2010-2015

=== 2020 census ===
As of the 2020 census, the county had a population of 23,158. The median age was 42.3 years. 23.0% of residents were under the age of 18 and 18.9% of residents were 65 years of age or older. For every 100 females there were 99.2 males, and for every 100 females age 18 and over there were 97.3 males.

The racial makeup of the county was 91.2% White, 1.0% Black or African American, 0.6% American Indian and Alaska Native, 0.3% Asian, 0.0% Native Hawaiian and Pacific Islander, 0.8% from some other race, and 6.0% from two or more races. Hispanic or Latino residents of any race comprised 2.5% of the population.

25.9% of residents lived in urban areas, while 74.1% lived in rural areas.

There were 9,081 households in the county, of which 30.4% had children under the age of 18 living with them and 22.1% had a female householder with no spouse or partner present. About 25.9% of all households were made up of individuals and 12.2% had someone living alone who was 65 years of age or older.

There were 9,842 housing units, of which 7.7% were vacant. Among occupied housing units, 77.1% were owner-occupied and 22.9% were renter-occupied. The homeowner vacancy rate was 1.4% and the rental vacancy rate was 6.3%.

=== Racial and ethnic composition ===
Ray County, Missouri – Racial and ethnic composition Note: the US Census treats Hispanic/Latino as an ethnic category. This table excludes Latinos from the racial categories and assigns them to a separate category. Hispanics/Latinos may be of any race.
Race / Ethnicity (NH = Non-Hispanic)	Pop 1980	Pop 1990	Pop 2000	Pop 2010	Pop 2020	% 1980	% 1990	% 2000	% 2010	% 2020
White alone (NH)	20,864	21,410	22,384	22,338	20,893	97.60%	97.45%	95.85%	95.08%	90.22%
Black or African American alone (NH)	313	296	340	265	227	1.46%	1.35%	1.46%	1.13%	0.98%
Native American or Alaska Native alone (NH)	60	109	80	114	133	0.28%	0.50%	0.34%	0.49%	0.57%
Asian alone (NH)	43	33	43	60	76	0.20%	0.15%	0.18%	0.26%	0.33%
Native Hawaiian or Pacific Islander alone (NH)	x	x	1	15	8	x	x	0.00%	0.06%	0.03%
Other race alone (NH)	4	4	13	3	53	0.02%	0.02%	0.06%	0.01%	0.23%
Mixed race or Multiracial (NH)	x	x	240	284	1,188	x	x	1.03%	1.21%	5.13%
Hispanic or Latino (any race)	94	119	253	415	580	0.44%	0.54%	1.08%	1.77%	2.50%
Total	21,378	21,971	23,354	23,494	23,158	100.00%	100.00%	100.00%	100.00%	100.00%

=== 2000 census ===
As of the 2000 census, there were 23,354 people, 8,743 households, and 6,539 families residing in the county. The population density was 16 people per square mile (6.2 people/km^{2}). There were 9,371 housing units at an average density of 6 units per square mile (2.3/km^{2}). The racial makeup of the county was 96.50% White, 1.46% Black or African American, 0.36% Native American, 0.19% Asian, 0.36% from other races, and 1.13% from two or more races. Approximately 1.08% of the population were Hispanic or Latino of any race. 29.6% were of American, 23.3% German, 11.5% English and 10.3% Irish ancestry.

There were 8,743 households, out of which 35.20% had children under the age of 18 living with them, 63.10% were married couples living together, 8.00% had a female householder with no husband present, and 25.20% were non-families. 22.10% of all households were made up of individuals, and 9.90% had someone living alone who was 65 years of age or older. The average household size was 2.63 and the average family size was 3.07.

In the county, the population was spread out, with 27.50% under the age of 18, 7.40% from 18 to 24, 28.30% from 25 to 44, 23.90% from 45 to 64, and 12.80% who were 65 years of age or older. The median age was 37 years. For every 100 females there were 100.20 males. For every 100 females age 18 and over, there were 96.30 males.

The median income for a household in the county was $41,886, and the median income for a family was $49,192. Males had a median income of $36,815 versus $21,684 for females. The per capita income for the county was $18,685. About 5.30% of families and 6.80% of the population were below the poverty line, including 8.00% of those under age 18 and 7.80% of those age 65 or over.

== Education ==
School districts including any part of the county, no matter how slight, include:

- Braymer C-4 School District
- Excelsior Springs 40 School District
- Hardin-Central C-2 School District
- Lawson R-XIV School District
- Norborne R-VIII School District
- Orrick R-XI School District
- Polo R-VII School District
- Richmond R-XVI School District

=== Public schools ===
- Hardin-Central C-2 School District – Hardin
  - Hardin-Central Elementary School (PK-06)
  - Hardin-Central High School (07-12)
- Lawson R-XIV School District – Lawson
  - Southwest Elementary School (PK-04)
  - Lawson Middle School (05-08)
  - Lawson High School (09-12)
- Orrick R-XI School District – Orrick
  - Orrick Elementary School (PK-06)
  - Orrick High School (07-12)
- Richmond R-XVI School District – Richmond
  - Dear Elementary School (PK-01)
  - Sunrise Elementary School (02-05)
  - Richmond Middle School (06-08)
  - Richmond High School (09-12)

=== Public libraries ===
- Ray County Library

== Communities ==
=== Cities ===
- Camden
- Crystal Lakes
- Excelsior Springs (mostly in Clay County)
- Fleming
- Hardin
- Henrietta
- Lawson (partly in Clay County)
- Orrick
- Richmond
- Wood Heights

=== Villages ===
- Elmira
- Excelsior Estates (small part in Clay County)
- Homestead

=== Census-designated place ===
- Rayville
- Vibbard

=== Other unincorporated communities ===
- Albany
- Dockery
- Elkhorn
- Floyd
- Georgeville
- Knoxville
- Lakeview
- Millville
- Morton
- New Garden
- Regal
- Rockingham
- Russellville
- Sandals
- St. Cloud
- Stet
- Swanwick
- Taitsville
- Tinney Grove

=== Townships ===
- Camden
- Crooked River
- Fishing River
- Grape Grove
- Knoxville
- Orrick
- Polk
- Richmond

== Notable people ==
- Robert Ford, outlaw, killer of Jesse James
- Chad Kilgore, football player
- Forrest Smith, Missouri's 42nd Governor
- Gordon Young, cowboy, journalist, novelist

== Law, government and politics ==
=== Government ===
On January 1, 2025, the Ray County Jail was closed after newly elected Sheriff Gary Blackwell, due to "safety and security concerns." Inmates were sent to facilities in neighboring Harrison and Lafayette counties, as well as the Daviess-Dekalb Regional Jail.

=== Politics ===
==== Local ====
Politics at the local level in Ray County are now almost all held by Republicans, with Republicans making major gains in the past four election cycles, going from no representation before 2011.

Ray County, Missouri

Elected countywide officials
Assessor	Kent Wollard	Democratic
Circuit Clerk	Carolyne Conner	Democratic
County Clerk	Heather Maulsby	Republican
Collector	Julie Chowning	Democratic
Commissioner (presiding)	Sheila Tracy	Republican
Commissioner (district 1)	Max Hockemeier	Republican
Commissioner (district 2)	Bobby Don Davis	Republican
Coroner	Bart Willem	Republican
Prosecuting Attorney	Camille Johnston	Republican
Public Administrator	Shannon D. Morris	Republican
Recorder	Shirley O’Dell	Democratic
Sheriff	Gary Blackwell	Republican
Surveyor	Thomas Sisco	Republican
Treasurer	Melissa Holloway	Independent

==== State ====
Past Gubernatorial Elections Results
Year	Republican	Democratic	Third Parties
2024	72.05% 8,256	25.67% 2,942	2.28% 261
2020	68.93% 7,964	28.38% 3,279	2.68% 310
2016	52.51% 5,686	43.58% 4,719	3.91% 423
2012	41.26% 4,252	55.53% 5,722	3.21% 331
2008	35.73% 3,899	61.13% 6,670	3.14% 343
2004	47.08% 5,073	51.33% 5,531	1.59% 172
2000	41.75% 4,045	55.81% 5,407	2.44% 237
1996	28.31% 2,475	69.26% 6,055	2.43% 212
1992	37.6% 3,578	62.4% 5,937	N/A
1988	56.26% 4,859	43.01% 3,714	0.73% 63

The northwest corner of Ray County is a part of Missouri's 8th District in the Missouri House of Representatives and is currently represented by Jim Neely (R-Cameron).

Missouri House of Representatives — District 8 — Ray County (2016)
Party	Candidate	Votes	%	±%
Republican	James W. (Jim) Neely	1,294	100.00%	+32.60

Missouri House of Representatives — District 8 — Ray County (2014)
Party	Candidate	Votes	%	±%
Republican	James W. (Jim) Neely	548	67.40%	+12.22
Democratic	Ted Rights	265	32.60%	−12.22

Missouri House of Representatives — District 8 — Ray County (2012)
Party	Candidate	Votes	%	±%
Republican	James W. (Jim) Neely	788	55.18%	
Democratic	James T. (Jim) Crenshaw	640	44.82%	

Most of Ray County is a part of Missouri's 39th District in the Missouri House of Representatives and is currently represented by Joe Don McGaugh (R-Carrollton).

Missouri House of Representatives — District 39 — Ray County (2016)
Party	Candidate	Votes	%	±%
Republican	Joe Don McGaugh	7,741	100.00%	

Missouri House of Representatives — District 39 — Ray County (2014)
Party	Candidate	Votes	%	±%
Republican	Joe Don McGaugh	4,583	100.00%	+50.64

Missouri House of Representatives — District 39 — Ray County (2012)
Party	Candidate	Votes	%	±%
Republican	Joe Don McGaugh	4,176	49.36%	
Democratic	Will Talbert	4,285	50.64%	

All of Ray County is a part of Missouri's 21st District in the Missouri Senate and is currently represented by Denny Hoskins (R-Warrensburg).

Missouri Senate — District 21 — Ray County (2016)
Party	Candidate	Votes	%	±%
Republican	Denny Hoskins	6,408	61.80%	+4.37
Democratic	ElGene Ver Dught	3,346	32.27%	−4.99
Libertarian	Bill Wayne	615	5.93%	+0.62

Missouri Senate — District 21 — Ray County (2012)
Party	Candidate	Votes	%	±%
Republican	David Pearce	5,679	57.43%	
Democratic	ElGene Ver Dught	3,684	37.26%	
Libertarian	Steven Hedrick	525	5.31%	

==== Federal ====
U.S. Senate — Missouri — Ray County (2016)
Party	Candidate	Votes	%	±%
Republican	Roy Blunt	5,415	50.10%	+11.60
Democratic	Jason Kander	4,725	43.71%	−9.16
Libertarian	Jonathan Dine	390	3.61%	−5.02
Green	Johnathan McFarland	119	1.10%	+1.10
Constitution	Fred Ryman	159	1.47%	+1.47

U.S. Senate — Missouri — Ray County (2012)
Party	Candidate	Votes	%	±%
Republican	Todd Akin	3,960	38.50%	
Democratic	Claire McCaskill	5,439	52.87%	
Libertarian	Jonathan Dine	888	8.63%	

All of Ray County is included in Missouri's 5th Congressional District, which is currently represented by Emanuel Cleaver (D-Kansas City) in the United States House of Representatives.

U.S. House of Representatives — Missouri's 5th Congressional District — Ray County (2016)
Party	Candidate	Votes	%	±%
Democratic	Emanuel Cleaver	4,394	41.10%	+1.71
Republican	Jacob Turk	5,895	55.14%	−0.42
Libertarian	Roy Welborn	402	3.76%	−1.29

U.S. House of Representatives — Missouri's 5th Congressional District — Ray County (2014)
Party	Candidate	Votes	%	±%
Democratic	Emanuel Cleaver	2,506	39.39%	−7.66
Republican	Jacob Turk	3,535	55.56%	+6.16
Libertarian	Roy Welborn	321	5.05%	+1.50

U.S. House of Representatives — Missouri’s 5th Congressional District — Ray County (2012)
Party	Candidate	Votes	%	±%
Democratic	Emanuel Cleaver	4,778	47.05%	
Republican	Jacob Turk	5,017	49.40%	
Libertarian	Randy Langkraehr	361	3.55	

United States presidential election results for Ray County, Missouri
Year	Republican		Democratic		Third party(ies)	
Year	No.	%	No.	%	No.	%
1888	1,796	35.17%	3,181	62.29%	130	2.55%
1892	1,643	32.29%	3,250	63.86%	196	3.85%
1896	2,003	33.31%	3,945	65.60%	66	1.10%
1900	2,004	35.02%	3,631	63.46%	87	1.52%
1904	1,792	38.86%	2,744	59.51%	75	1.63%
1908	1,914	37.74%	3,043	60.00%	115	2.27%
1912	1,192	24.18%	3,042	61.70%	696	14.12%
1916	1,718	33.28%	3,380	65.47%	65	1.26%
1920	3,228	39.53%	4,865	59.58%	72	0.88%
1924	2,753	34.24%	4,989	62.04%	299	3.72%
1928	3,280	41.70%	4,570	58.10%	16	0.20%
1932	1,706	21.74%	6,088	77.59%	52	0.66%
1936	2,805	30.74%	6,300	69.05%	19	0.21%
1940	3,399	36.94%	5,786	62.88%	16	0.17%
1944	3,094	40.57%	4,521	59.28%	12	0.16%
1948	2,102	30.30%	4,826	69.57%	9	0.13%
1952	3,349	40.64%	4,869	59.09%	22	0.27%
1956	3,041	39.61%	4,636	60.39%	0	0.00%
1960	3,542	43.69%	4,565	56.31%	0	0.00%
1964	1,734	25.05%	5,189	74.95%	0	0.00%
1968	2,587	35.90%	3,541	49.14%	1,078	14.96%
1972	4,205	59.65%	2,844	40.35%	0	0.00%
1976	2,853	33.72%	5,535	65.42%	73	0.86%
1980	4,064	45.81%	4,518	50.93%	289	3.26%
1984	4,875	55.06%	3,979	44.94%	0	0.00%
1988	3,763	43.44%	4,879	56.33%	20	0.23%
1992	2,563	26.64%	4,457	46.33%	2,600	27.03%
1996	2,884	32.82%	4,714	53.65%	1,189	13.53%
2000	4,517	46.34%	4,970	50.99%	260	2.67%
2004	5,673	52.59%	5,034	46.66%	81	0.75%
2008	5,593	50.60%	5,241	47.42%	219	1.98%
2012	5,815	56.09%	4,275	41.24%	277	2.67%
2016	7,104	64.91%	3,090	28.23%	751	6.86%
2020	8,345	71.64%	3,109	26.69%	195	1.67%
2024	8,602	73.76%	2,927	25.10%	133	1.14%

== See also ==
- Battle of Crooked River
- Mormon War (1838)
- National Register of Historic Places listings in Ray County, Missouri
