= Camden, Missouri =

- City
- Location of Camden, Missouri
- Coordinates: 39°11′57″N 94°01′24″W
- Country: United States
- State: Missouri
- County: Ray
- Incorporated: 1846

Area
  - Total: 0.44 sq mi (1.15 km^{2})
  - Land: 0.44 sq mi (1.15 km^{2})
  - Water: 0 sq mi (0.00 km^{2})
- Elevation: 784 ft (239 m)

Population (2020)
  - Total: 175
  - Density: 393/sq mi (151.8/km^{2})
- Time zone: UTC-6 (Central (CST))
  - Summer (DST): UTC-5 (CDT)
- ZIP code: 64017
- Area code: 816
- FIPS code: 29-10738
- GNIS feature ID: 2393509

Camden is a city in southern Ray County, Missouri, and part of the Kansas City metropolitan area within the United States. The population was 175 at the 2020 census.

== History ==
Camden was platted in 1838. The community most likely was named after a family of early settlers. Camden was a Missouri River boat stop until the early 1900s, when the Missouri River's Camden bend was cut off after major river flooding, moving the new channel south. A post office called Camden began operation in 1838, but closed in the early 2000s.

== Geography ==
According to the United States Census Bureau, the city has a total area of 0.76 square miles (1.97 km^{2}), all land.

== Demographics ==
Historical population
Census	Pop.	Note	%±
1860	364		—
1870	357		−1.9%
1880	509		42.6%
1890	650		27.7%
1900	392		−39.7%
1910	477		21.7%
1920	534		11.9%
1930	407		−23.8%
1940	399		−2.0%
1950	383		−4.0%
1960	310		−19.1%
1970	286		−7.7%
1980	219		−23.4%
1990	238		8.7%
2000	209		−12.2%
2010	191		−8.6%
2020	175		−8.4%
U.S. Decennial Census

=== 2010 census ===
As of the census of 2010, there were 191 people, 73 households, and 48 families living in the city. The population density was 251.3 inhabitants per square mile (97.0/km^{2}). There were 87 housing units at an average density of 114.5 per square mile (44.2/km^{2}). The racial makeup of the city was 99.0% White and 1.0% from two or more races. Hispanic or Latino of any race were 0.5% of the population.

There were 73 households, of which 31.5% had children under the age of 18 living with them, 57.5% were married couples living together, 2.7% had a female householder with no husband present, 5.5% had a male householder with no wife present, and 34.2% were non-families. 27.4% of all households were made up of individuals, and 12.3% had someone living alone who was 65 years of age or older. The average household size was 2.62 and the average family size was 3.27.

The median age in the city was 36.5 years. 26.2% of residents were under the age of 18; 6.7% were between the ages of 18 and 24; 27.3% were from 25 to 44; 23.5% were from 45 to 64; and 16.2% were 65 years of age or older. The gender makeup of the city was 55.0% male and 45.0% female.

=== 2000 census ===
As of the census of 2000, there were 209 people, 84 households, and 57 families living in the city. The population density was 277.0 inhabitants per square mile (107.0/km^{2}). There were 93 housing units at an average density of 123.2 per square mile (47.6/km^{2}). The racial makeup of the city was 98.09% White, 0.96% African American, and 0.96% from two or more races. Hispanic or Latino of any race were 0.48% of the population.

There were 84 households, out of which 38.1% had children under the age of 18 living with them, 60.7% were married couples living together, 4.8% had a female householder with no husband present, and 32.1% were non-families. 28.6% of all households were made up of individuals, and 19.0% had someone living alone who was 65 years of age or older. The average household size was 2.49 and the average family size was 3.05.

In the city the population was spread out, with 26.3% under the age of 18, 7.7% from 18 to 24, 29.2% from 25 to 44, 20.6% from 45 to 64, and 16.3% who were 65 years of age or older. The median age was 39 years. For every 100 females there were 97.2 males. For every 100 females age 18 and over, there were 94.9 males.

The median income for a household in the city was $25,833, and the median income for a family was $27,813. Males had a median income of $27,188 versus $18,000 for females. The per capita income for the city was $13,194. About 3.5% of families and 9.8% of the population were below the poverty line, including 11.5% of those under the age of eighteen and 26.7% of those 65 or over.

== Education ==
It is in the Richmond R-XVI School District.
