= Crooked River (Missouri) =

Tributary of the Missouri River in west-central Missouri

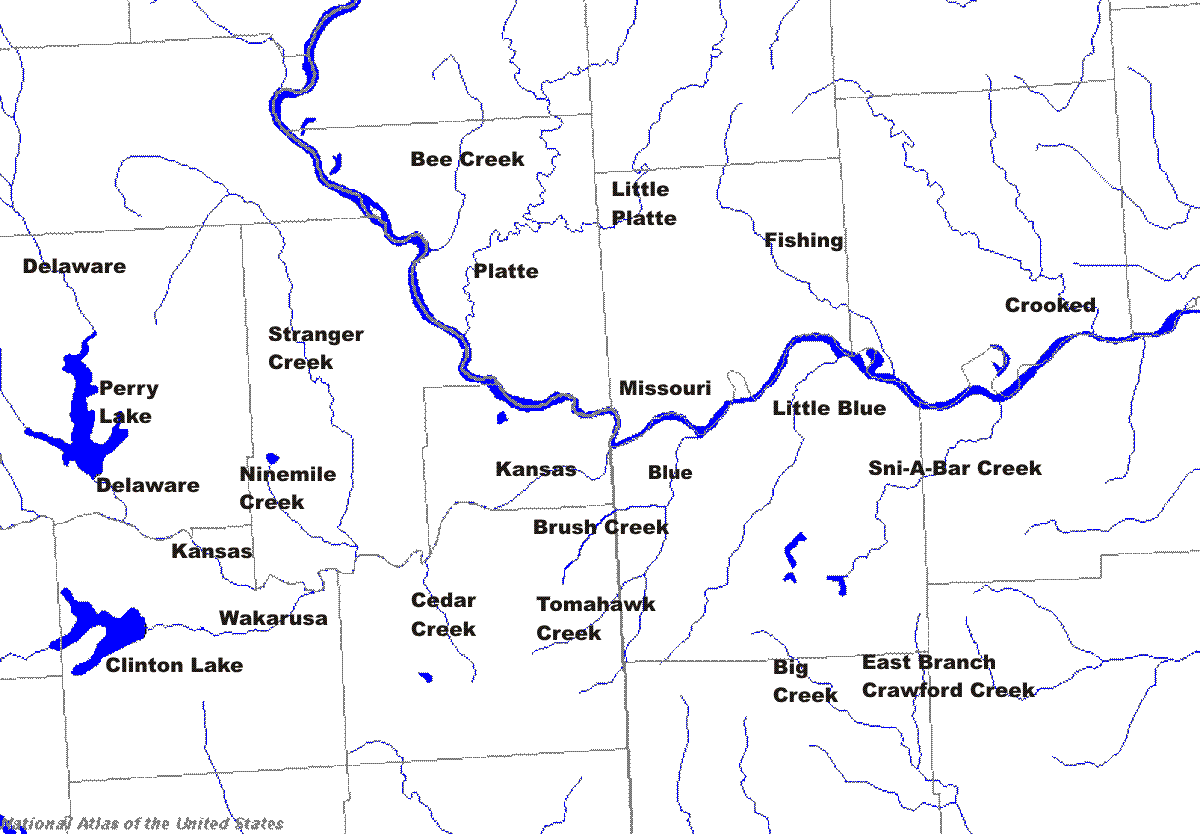
Kansas City metropolitan rivers with Crooked River in the east.

The Crooked River is a tributary of the Missouri River in west-central Missouri in the United States. The stream has also been known historically as "Big Creek," "Little River" and "Tiger River." The Crooked River was named for its meandering disposition. Big Creek refers to the stream's status as the largest tributary to the Missouri River in the county.

The Crooked River headwaters arise approximately four miles southeast of Lathrop just east of I-35 in southeastern Clinton County and flows generally southeastwardly through the southwest corner of Caldwell and Ray counties. In southwestern Ray County it collects the short East Fork and West Fork and flows into the Missouri River, approximately 4 miles (6 km) south of Hardin and 2.5 miles northeast of Lexington across the Missouri in northern Lafayette County.

== Location ==
Mouth
Confluence with the Missouri River, Ray County, Missouri: 39°13′00″N 93°50′33″W
Source
Clinton County, Missouri: 39°30′24″N 94°16′37″W

== See also ==
- List of Missouri rivers
- Battle of Crooked River
