= Richmond, Missouri =

City in Missouri, U.S.

- City
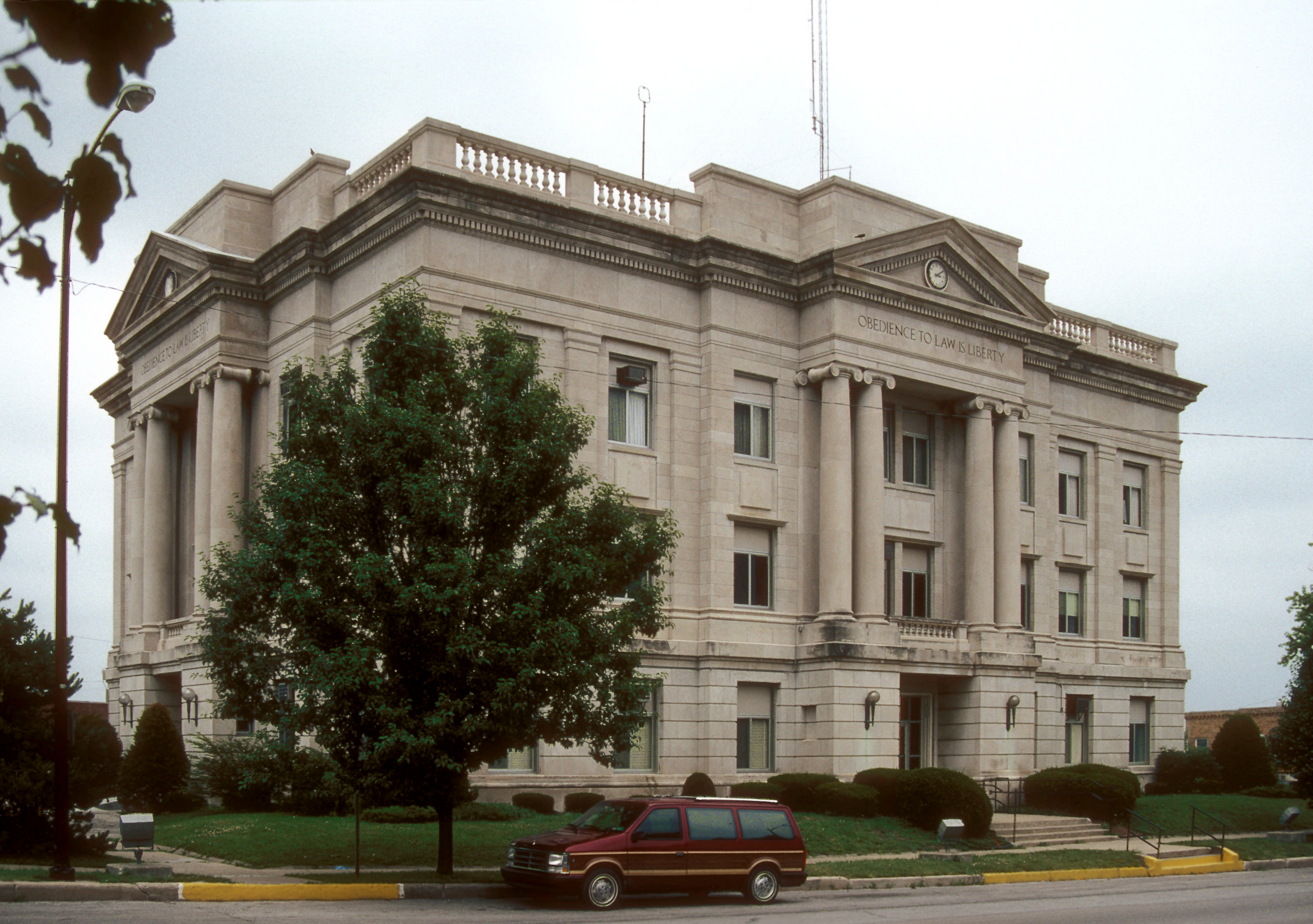
- Ray County Courthouse in Richmond

- Location of Richmond, Missouri
- Coordinates: 39°16′39″N 93°58′33″W
- Country: United States
- State: Missouri
- County: Ray
- Named for: Richmond, Virginia

Area
  - Total: 6.17 sq mi (15.98 km^{2})
  - Land: 6.15 sq mi (15.93 km^{2})
  - Water: 0.019 sq mi (0.05 km^{2})
- Elevation: 814 ft (248 m)

Population (2020)
  - Total: 6,013
  - Density: 977.7/sq mi (377.51/km^{2})
- Time zone: UTC-6 (Central (CST))
  - Summer (DST): UTC-5 (CDT)
- ZIP code: 64085
- Area codes: 816, 975
- FIPS code: 29-61670
- GNIS feature ID: 2396368
- Website: City of Richmond Official Website

Richmond is a city in and the county seat of Ray County, Missouri, United States, and is part of the Kansas City metropolitan area. The population was 6,013 at the 2020 census.

== History ==
Richmond was platted in 1828. The community was named after Richmond, Virginia. A post office called Richmond has been in operation since 1828.

== Geography ==
Richmond is located in south central Ray County at the intersection of Missouri routes 10 and 13. The west fork of Crooked River flows past northeast of the city. Lexington in adjacent Lafayette County is on the south bank of the Missouri River eight miles to the southeast.

According to the United States Census Bureau, the city has a total area of 5.90 square miles (15.28 km^{2}), of which 5.88 square miles (15.23 km^{2}) is land and 0.02 square miles (0.05 km^{2}) is water.

== Demographics ==
Historical population
| Census | Pop. | Note | %± |
|---|---|---|---|
| 1860 | 615 | | — |
| 1870 | 1,218 | | 98.0% |
| 1880 | 1,424 | | 16.9% |
| 1890 | 2,895 | | 103.3% |
| 1900 | 3,478 | | 20.1% |
| 1910 | 3,664 | | 5.3% |
| 1920 | 4,409 | | 20.3% |
| 1930 | 4,129 | | −6.4% |
| 1940 | 4,240 | | 2.7% |
| 1950 | 4,299 | | 1.4% |
| 1960 | 4,604 | | 7.1% |
| 1970 | 4,948 | | 7.5% |
| 1980 | 5,499 | | 11.1% |
| 1990 | 5,738 | | 4.3% |
| 2000 | 6,116 | | 6.6% |
| 2010 | 5,797 | | −5.2% |
| 2020 | 6,013 | | 3.7% |
U.S. Decennial Census

=== 2020 census ===
As of the 2020 census, Richmond had a population of 6,013. The median age was 38.9 years. 24.1% of residents were under the age of 18 and 19.4% of residents were 65 years of age or older. For every 100 females there were 87.9 males, and for every 100 females age 18 and over there were 82.8 males age 18 and over.

92.6% of residents lived in urban areas, while 7.4% lived in rural areas.

There were 2,553 households in Richmond, of which 28.6% had children under the age of 18 living in them. Of all households, 39.1% were married-couple households, 17.9% were households with a male householder and no spouse or partner present, and 33.8% were households with a female householder and no spouse or partner present. About 37.0% of all households were made up of individuals and 17.4% had someone living alone who was 65 years of age or older.

There were 2,800 housing units, of which 8.8% were vacant. The homeowner vacancy rate was 2.0% and the rental vacancy rate was 7.5%.

Racial composition as of the 2020 census
| Race | Number | Percent |
|---|---|---|
| White | 5,293 | 88.0% |
| Black or African American | 143 | 2.4% |
| American Indian and Alaska Native | 35 | 0.6% |
| Asian | 31 | 0.5% |
| Native Hawaiian and Other Pacific Islander | 6 | 0.1% |
| Some other race | 57 | 0.9% |
| Two or more races | 448 | 7.5% |
| Hispanic or Latino (of any race) | 183 | 3.0% |

=== 2010 census ===
As of the census of 2010, there were 5,797 people, 2,430 households, and 1,475 families living in the city. The population density was 985.9 inhabitants per square mile (380.7/km^{2}). There were 2,777 housing units at an average density of 472.3 per square mile (182.4/km^{2}). The racial makeup of the city was 93.7% White, 3.2% African American, 0.4% Native American, 0.4% Asian, 0.2% Pacific Islander, 0.3% from other races, and 1.9% from two or more races. Hispanic or Latino of any race were 2.1% of the population.

There were 2,430 households, of which 30.7% had children under the age of 18 living with them, 42.7% were married couples living together, 13.2% had a female householder with no husband present, 4.8% had a male householder with no wife present, and 39.3% were non-families. 33.9% of all households were made up of individuals, and 14.1% had someone living alone who was 65 years of age or older. The average household size was 2.31 and the average family size was 2.93.

The median age in the city was 39.5 years. 23.2% of residents were under the age of 18; 8.8% were between the ages of 18 and 24; 24.1% were from 25 to 44; 25.6% were from 45 to 64; and 18.2% were 65 years of age or older. The gender makeup of the city was 46.5% male and 53.5% female.

=== 2000 census ===
As of the census of 2000, there were 6,116 people, 2,488 households, and 1,579 families living in the city. The population density was 1,062.7 inhabitants per square mile (410.3/km^{2}). There were 2,651 housing units at an average density of 460.6 per square mile (177.8/km^{2}). The racial makeup of the city was 94.29% White, 3.73% African American, 3 Native American, 1 Asian, 0.38% from other races, and 1.29% from two or more races. Hispanic or Latino of any race were 1.03% of the population.

There were 2,488 households, out of which 33.0% had children under the age of 18 living with them, 47.5% were married couples living together, 12.2% had a female householder with no husband present, and 36.5% were non-families. 32.4% of all households were made up of individuals, and 15.9% had someone living alone who was 65 years of age or older. The average household size was 2.40 and the average family size was 3.02.

In the city, the population was spread out, with 27.2% under the age of 18, 8.3% from 18 to 24, 27.5% from 25 to 44, 19.9% from 45 to 64, and 17.1% who were 65 years of age or older. The median age was 36 years. For every 100 females, there were 89.1 males. For every 100 females age 18 and over, there were 81.6 males.

The median income for a household in the city was $33,514, and the median income for a family was $45,186. Males had a median income of $34,500 versus $20,772 for females. The per capita income for the city was $18,021. About 8.1% of families and 10.7% of the population were below the poverty line, including 10.5% of those under age 18 and 12.9% of those age 65 or over.

== Arts and culture ==
=== Museums ===
The Ray County History Museum houses both the Ray County Historical Society and the library of the Ray County Genealogy Association. The large, two-story red brick building was built in 1910 as the Ray County Poor Farm with separate wings for male and female residents, and is listed on the National Register of Historic Places. The museum's many rooms are filled with themed exhibits displaying artifacts from the Civil War, World War 1, World War 2, Mormon history, and local artifacts illustrating life on historical homesteads. According to local lore, the museum building is a site of suspected paranormal activity.

=== Visual and performing arts ===
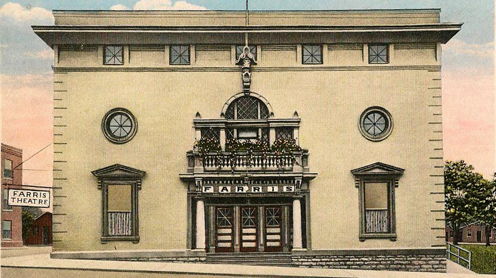
A historical postcard featuring the Farris Theatre.

The Farris Theatre, which was designed by the prominent Kansas City architects Shepard and Farrar, and originally opened as the Dougherty Auditorium in 1901, is listed on the National Register of Historic Places. Today it is owned and operated by the Friends of Farris Theatre, Inc, a non-profit that organizes both live performances and showings of digital cinema movies. The theater is located within the Farris Arts District. The Arts District also includes the Hall for Arts Education and the Gallery and Museum for Fine Arts, which are housed in historical buildings originally built for the Order of Knights of Pythias and Fraternal Order of Eagles.

== Parks and recreation ==
The city has approximately 60 acres of parkland distributed across five public parks. Southview Park is the largest city park with 35.3 acres, and its facilities include a public outdoor swimming pool and a community amphitheater. Cevie Due Park is the site of the city's skate park. The centerpiece of Maurice Roberts park is a decommissioned Lockheed T-33 jet trainer airplane on outdoor display. Hamann Park is the newest park in the system, and is currently under development; plans include a nature walk through the mostly wooded six-acre site.

In addition to parks, the city operates a gymnasium. Now part of the city hall complex, it was originally built in 1955 as a gym for the Richmond High School.

Richmond is home to a semi-private 18-hole golf course. The well-regarded course was designed in 1969 by Chet Mendenhall, who was a founding member of the Golf Course Superintendents Association of America (GCSAA).

== Education ==
=== Primary and secondary schools ===
Richmond is served by the Richmond R-XVI School District. The district operates four public schools: Dear Elementary School, Sunrise Elementary School, Richmond Middle School, and Richmond High School.

=== Libraries ===
The Ray County Library was officially formed by voters in 1946, and has been at its present location of 215 East Lexington St since 2004. The facilities include a genealogy room, a community room and a computer training lab.

The Ray County Genealogy Association maintains a library within the Ray County Museum.

== Notable people ==
- "Bloody Bill" Anderson, Confederate guerilla leader, was killed nearby and is buried here
- Aaron H. Conrow, attorney and Confederate States of America representative during the Civil War
- Alexander William Doniphan, 19th-century soldier and political figure who spent his last years in Richmond
- Lenvil Elliott, NFL player for Super Bowl champion San Francisco 49ers
- Robert Ford, the man who shot Jesse James
- Austin Augustus King, Governor of Missouri 1848–1853
- Dan Lanning, Oregon Ducks football head coach
- Michael Letzig, professional golfer
- Charles H. Mansur, U.S. congressman and second Comptroller of the Treasury
- Jacob L. Milligan, U.S. congressman
- Maurice M. Milligan, U.S. attorney who successfully prosecuted Kansas City political boss Tom Pendergast in 1939
- John Rooney, radio and television sportscaster
- Forrest Smith, Governor of Missouri 1949–1953
- Beryl Wayne Sprinkel, economist
- David Whitmer, mayor of Richmond

== See also ==
- List of cities in Missouri
