= Interstate 49 =

Interstate Highway in Louisiana, Arkansas, and Missouri

Interstate 49
- I-49 highlighted in red, AR 549 highlighted in blue

Route information
- Length: 547.52 mi (881.15 km)
- Existed: 1977–present
- NHS: Entire route

Original segment
- South end: I-10 / US 167 / LA 182 in Lafayette, LA
- Major intersections: US 71 in Alexandria, LA
- North end: I-20 in Shreveport, LA

Central segment
- South end: I-220 in Shreveport, LA
- Major intersections: I-30 in Texarkana, AR
- North end: US 59 / US 71 in Texarkana, AR

Northern segment
- South end: I-40 / US 71 near Alma, AR
- Major intersections: I-42 in Springdale, AR; US 71 in Pineville, MO; I-44 in Joplin, MO
- North end: I-435 / I-470 / US 50 / US 71 in Kansas City, MO

Location
- Country: United States
- States: Louisiana, Arkansas, Missouri

Highway system
- Interstate Highway System; Main; Auxiliary; Suffixed; Business; Future

Interstate 49 (I-49) is a north–south Interstate Highway with multiple segments. The original portion is entirely within Louisiana with an additional signed portion extending from I-220 in Shreveport to the Arkansas state line, three newer sections are in Arkansas, and one section in Missouri. Its southern terminus is in Lafayette, Louisiana, at I-10 while its northern terminus is in Kansas City, Missouri, at I-435 and I-470. Future plans include portions of the remaining roadway in Louisiana, Arkansas, and Texas, to link Kansas City, Missouri with New Orleans.

Although not part of the original 1957 Interstate Highway plan, residents of Missouri, Arkansas, and Louisiana began campaigning for the highway in 1965 via the "US 71 - I-29 Association". The campaign called for I-29 to be extended south from Kansas City to New Orleans following much of the route along U.S. Route 71 (US 71). The plan called for creating a limited access expressway from New Orleans to the Canadian border and on to Winnipeg (via Manitoba Highway 75). When I-49 is complete, the goal of the association will have been accomplished, with only a brief gap between the Grandview Triangle and I-29 at the Kansas City Downtown Loop served by US 71 (Bruce R. Watkins Memorial Drive) or other Interstates such as I-435 and I-70 in Kansas City.

== Route description ==
Lengths
	mi	km
LA	239.25	385.04
AR	124.31	200.06
TX	—N/a	—N/a
MO	183.96	296.05
Total	547.52	881.15

=== Louisiana ===
The southern terminus of I-49 is located at a cloverleaf interchange with I-10 and US 167 in the southern Louisiana city of Lafayette. Southbound motorists continue through the interchange onto the Evangeline Thruway, which transitions from a limited-access portion of LA 182 to a major divided thoroughfare that picks up the US 90 corridor heading through the heart of Lafayette. I-49 begins its journey concurrent with US 167 as it travels northward through Carencro, Sunset, Grand Coteau, and Opelousas. US 167 departs from the Interstate's alignment at exit 23 between Opelousas and Washington, and I-49 begins to take a northwesterly path through the heavily wooded rural terrain. Various state highways provide access to the small towns and cities located along the parallel US 71 and US 167 corridors, such as Lebeau, Ville Platte, Bunkie, and Cheneyville. After crossing US 167, I-49 travels between US 71 and US 165 into the Alexandria metropolitan area in central Louisiana.

I-49 travels through downtown Alexandria doubling as U.S. Highway 71 Bypass (US 71 Byp.) and is also concurrent with portions of US 167 and Louisiana Highway 28 (LA 28). Major interchanges with US 167 and US 71 lead to bridges that cross the Red River into the neighboring city of Pineville. Continuing northwest from Alexandria, I-49 parallels the Red River and LA 1 through Boyce and passes just west of the historic city of Natchitoches, which is reached via LA 6 at exit 138. Between Natchitoches and Shreveport, I-49 travels between LA 1 and US 171 and has junctions with US 371 and US 84, connecting with Coushatta and Mansfield, respectively.

In Shreveport, the Interstate heads directly into the downtown area and terminates at I-20, a route that facilitates eastbound traffic. However, through traffic bound for I-20 west and the northern segment of I-49 is directed to transfer onto LA 3132 at an interchange located about 5.5 miles (8.9 km) south of this terminus. LA 3132 is a western freeway bypass of Shreveport known as the Inner Loop Expressway that becomes I-220 upon intersecting I-20. On the northside of town, motorists may exit I-220 and follow the next segment of I-49, which parallels US 71 into Arkansas.

The heaviest traffic on I-49 occurs within the cities of Shreveport and Opelousas. The stretch of freeway in Shreveport sees an average of 70,000 vehicles per day, while the stretch of freeway between Lafayette and Carencro sees an average of 55,000 vehicles per day, and the stretch of freeway through Opelousas sees an average of 45,000 vehicles per day between the Judson Walsh Drive and Creswell Lane exits.

During the sugarcane season, many trucks and tractors pulling heavy cane wagons cause traffic congestion and accidents.

=== Arkansas ===
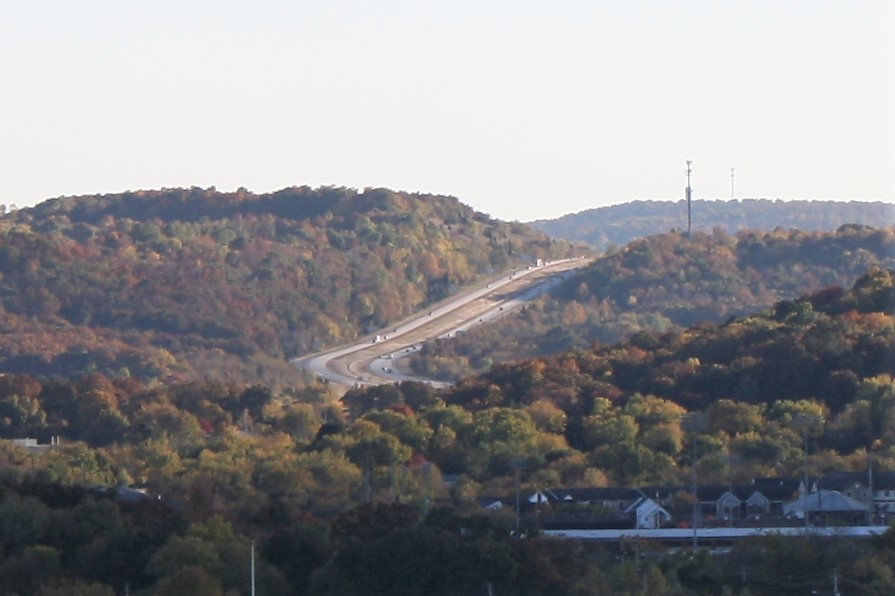
I-49 rises into the Ozark Mountains south of Fayetteville.

I-49 in Arkansas is composed of three disconnected segments: northern, southern, and a short connector skirting Fort Smith near Fort Chaffee designated as AR 549.

The southern segment of I-49 enters Arkansas from Louisiana. The short segment progresses northward to a temporary terminus at US 71 and US 59 at the Texas state line north of Texarkana.

The northern segment of I-49 in Arkansas, most of which was formerly signed as part of I-540, begins at I-40 in Alma and runs north to Northwest Arkansas through the Boston Mountains. The freeway passes through steep, sparsely populated terrain before entering the Bobby Hopper Tunnel in Washington County. Entering Northwest Arkansas, I-49 has seven exits for Fayetteville and three exits for Springdale before entering Benton County. The route serves as the boundary between Bentonville and Rogers, with seven exits for the two cities. After an interchange with US 71 just south of the Bentonville–Bella Vista city line, I-49 follows the Bella Vista Bypass, which runs to the south and west of Bella Vista before crossing into Missouri.

I-49 is designated as the Boston Mountains Scenic Loop between Alma and Fayetteville. The I-49 designation replaced the I-540 designation through Northwest Arkansas in March 2014, with the exception of the Bella Vista Bypass, which was constructed between July 2011 and October 2021.

=== Missouri ===
I-49 enters Missouri from Arkansas on the Bella Vista Bypass, eventually reuniting with US 71 south of Pineville. Continuing northward, I-49 passes through several smaller communities, including Neosho, before reaching Joplin. In Joplin, I-49 junctions with I-44 and begins a short concurrency with I-44 for exits 11 through 18.

Just a few miles east of Joplin, I-49 leaves I-44 and heads north and enters Carthage, intersecting with Interstate 49 Business (I-49 Bus.)/Route 171, which provides an alternate route for northbound I-49 travelers through Joplin. I-49 then passes through Nevada and other communities before reaching the Kansas City metropolitan area. I-49 intersects with I-470 and I-435, which provides connection to I-70, I-35, and I-29.

In south Kansas City, at Bannister Road just north of the Grandview Triangle, the I-49 designation ends, and the freeway continues as Interstate 435 north to I-70 west and the expressway continues as US 71, which proceeds into Downtown Kansas City as Bruce R. Watkins Memorial Drive.

== History ==
=== Louisiana ===
The original plans for the Interstate Highway System did not include a north–south connection between I-10 and I-20 within Louisiana. In 1965, Governor John McKeithen proposed a toll road to perform this function and extend it to New Orleans, but the idea was never carried out. In the mid-1970s, the Federal Highway Administration (FHWA) approved an Interstate Highway to run between US 190 in Opelousas and I-20 in Shreveport, a route that was designated as I-49 by the American Association of State Highway and Transportation Officials (AASHTO) in the summer of 1977. The mileage was gained from mileage released from other highways the states did not build and 153 miles (246 km) from a supplemental reserve. In 1981, AASHTO approved a slight extension of the designation along the existing route of US 167 from Opelousas south to I-10 in Lafayette. In its early history, I-49 was commonly referred to as the North–South Expressway.

Construction of I-49 began in 1981 between Opelousas and the small town of Washington. This segment joined the portion running concurrent with US 167, an existing limited-access highway, and was completed by 1983. By the following year, virtually all remaining rural portions of the route were under construction, and 95 percent of this mileage was completed and opened to traffic between late 1987 and late 1989. The remaining portions running through the urban centers of Alexandria and Shreveport required a much greater expenditure of time and funding. The entire length of the 212-mile (341 km) road was completed on May 1, 1996, with the opening of a 16.6-mile (26.7 km) section in downtown Alexandria named the Martin Luther King Jr. Highway. The total cost of I-49's construction was about $1.38 billion (equivalent to $2.61 billion in 2025). In 1991, the Intermodal Surface Transportation Efficiency Act (ISTEA) was passed designating an extension of I-49 to Kansas City, Missouri as "High Priority Corridor 1."

"Interstate 49 North" was a 36-mile (58 km) construction project that extended the highway from I-20 in Shreveport to the Arkansas state line and was divided into 11 segments. On November 27, 2013, the first 18.9-mile (30.4 km) section between LA 1 and US 71 opened to traffic, and the extension to a point just south of the Arkansas state line opened in March 2014. On May 31, 2017, a 4.25-mile (6.84 km) portion between LA 3194 (Martin Luther King Jr. Drive) and LA 1 in Shreveport was opened to northbound traffic. On June 15, 2018, the entire 5.25-mile (8.45 km) portion of I-49 between I-220 and LA 1, including an interchange with I-220, was opened to traffic. The remaining interchange ramps opened to traffic on October 17, 2018.

=== Arkansas and Missouri ===
Arkansas and Missouri pursued an I-49 designation for US 71 and I-540 for many years. In the early 2000s, there were plans by both states to rename the roadway as such between I-44 west of Joplin and I-40 at Fort Smith once a new bypass of US 71 had been completed around Bella Vista, Arkansas, and north to Pineville, Missouri. However, the AASHTO Special Committee on U.S. Route Numbers and Interstate Highways denied the I-49 designation at their annual meeting in September 2007 because none of the new roadway was yet under construction. During this time, there was also some debate as to whether the I-29 designation should be extended farther south from its current terminus in Kansas City to either Joplin or all the way to Fort Smith.

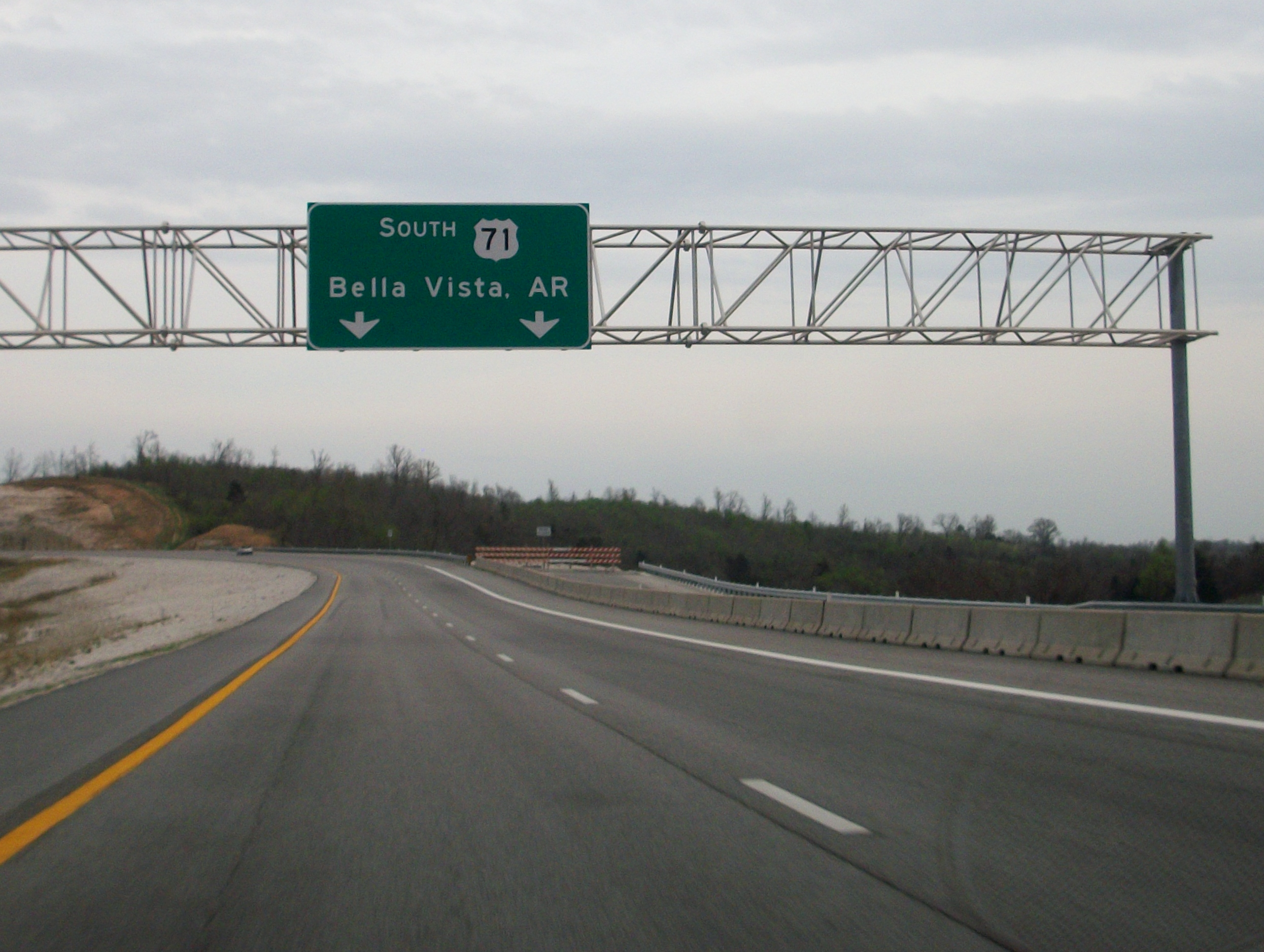
A ghost ramp is at the northern end of the Bella Vista Bypass in 2011; the bypass was built and opened on October 1, 2021.

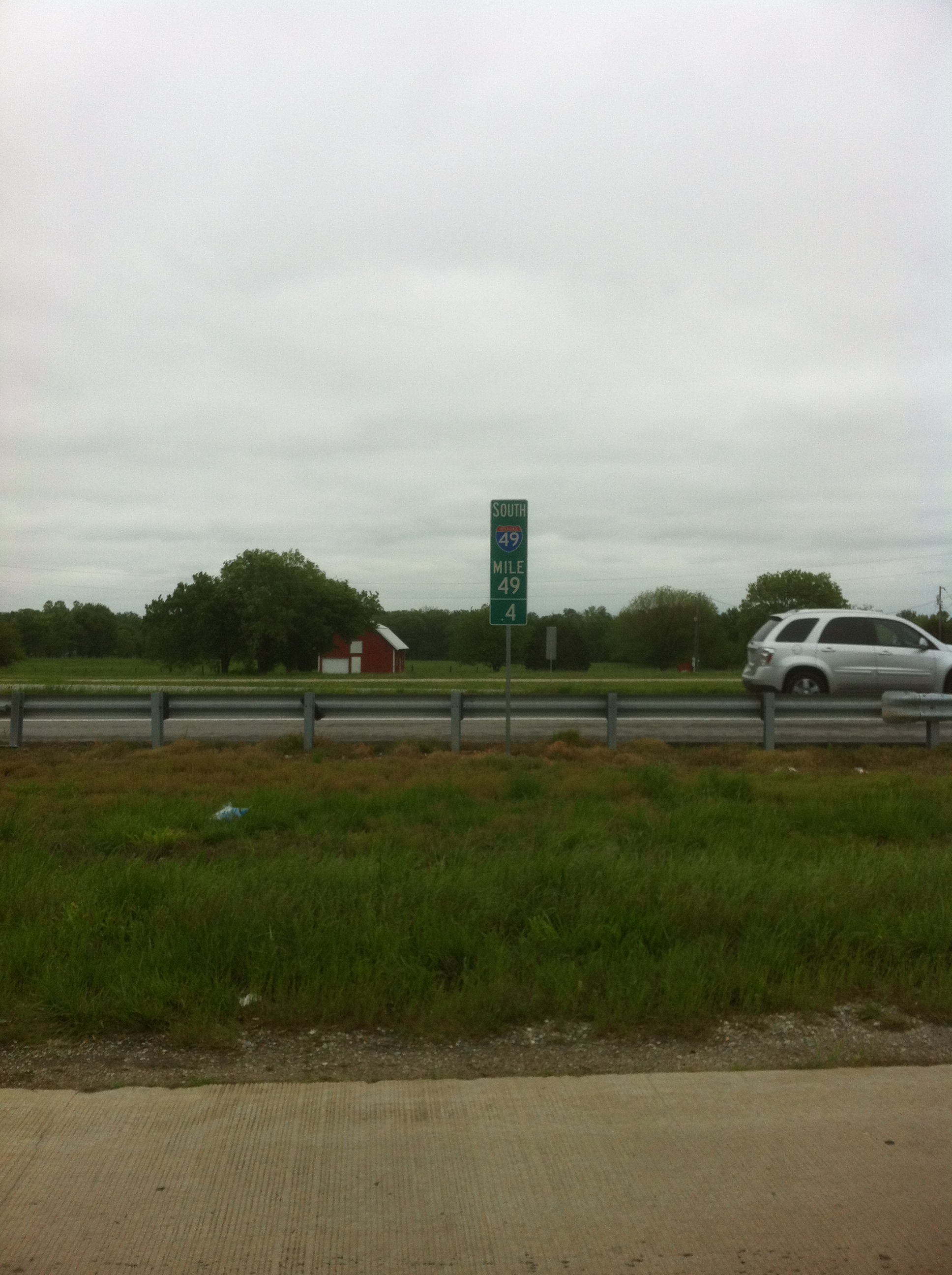
This I-49 milepost marker south of Carthage, Missouri, was temporarily turned so as not to be visible to traffic in April 2012.

The I-49 designation, consisting of 180 miles (290 km) in Missouri, became official at noon on December 12, 2012. The designation applies to current US 71 between I-435 in south Kansas City and Route H at Pineville (McDonald County), which was expanded to Interstate standards beginning in 2010. The last of the expansion projects was completed in December 2012. I-49 also runs concurrently with I-44 between exits 11 and 18 east of Joplin.

The Missouri Department of Transportation (MoDOT) began installing I-49 trailblazer signage (without shields) along with gantry signs and milemarkers, about 1200 signs in all, in February 2012. Signage bearing I-49 shields was covered or turned from view until the I-49 designation received final approval by FHWA. This includes milemarkers at 0.2-mile (0.32 km) intervals along the entire alignment apart from I-44.

The US 71 expansion involved removing all at-grade intersections and constructing interchanges and overpasses at 15 sites between Harrisonville and Lamar. The two-year project represented a shift in funding priorities for MoDOT, which, in 2007, announced the indefinite postponement of its portion of the Bella Vista bypass project, citing a $139-million (equivalent to $208 million in 2025) funding gap in Arkansas between construction costs and toll revenues, and Arkansas's commitment to only a two-lane bypass constructed over six years. MoDOT announced the Joplin-to-Kansas City expansion of US 71 in August 2010, to be done with the intention of bringing the I-49 designation to Missouri.

Most of the 10.2-mile (16.4 km) corridor in Kansas City, constructed between 1990 and 2001, was built to Interstate standards. However, three at-grade intersections—at Gregory Boulevard (71st Street), 59th Street, and 55th Street—prevent the I-49 designation from being extended all the way to downtown. All three of these intersections were on the Kansas City Police Department's 2010 list of "Top 20 Crash Sites in Kansas City", at #9, #6 and #4, respectively, and Watkins Drive has the reputation among commuters as "one of the city's most accident-prone stretches of road". Many neighborhood associations in Kansas City have historically objected to expanding Watkins Drive to a freeway. MoDOT has gone on record stating a court order keeps them from removing the stoplights, making conversion of this stretch unlikely. A MoDOT blog post says "Ample right of way was acquired to someday allow MoDOT to reconstruct the three signal-controlled, at-grade intersections to grade-separated interchanges, allowing traffic on Bruce R. Watkins Drive to flow unimpeded. Neither MoDOT nor the city of Kansas City can initiate this change. It is up to the citizens, who must raise the issue again through the court system to amend the class-action agreement."

The I-49 designation carries through the Three Trails Crossing (aka the Grandview Triangle) interchange to guide motorists onto US 71 north of I-435 and terminates north of I-435 and south of Bannister Road (Route W) around the 190.0 mile marker. From this point north, US 71 follows Bruce R. Watkins Drive, a parkway which directly connects the I-70/I-670 interchange in downtown Kansas City, and the I-35/I-29/I-70 interchange just to the north, to south Kansas City and I-435, I-470, and I-49.

I-130, a former future designation from 2000 to 2014, was removed and no longer exists as part of the Texarkana Loop.

==== Southern Arkansas segment ====
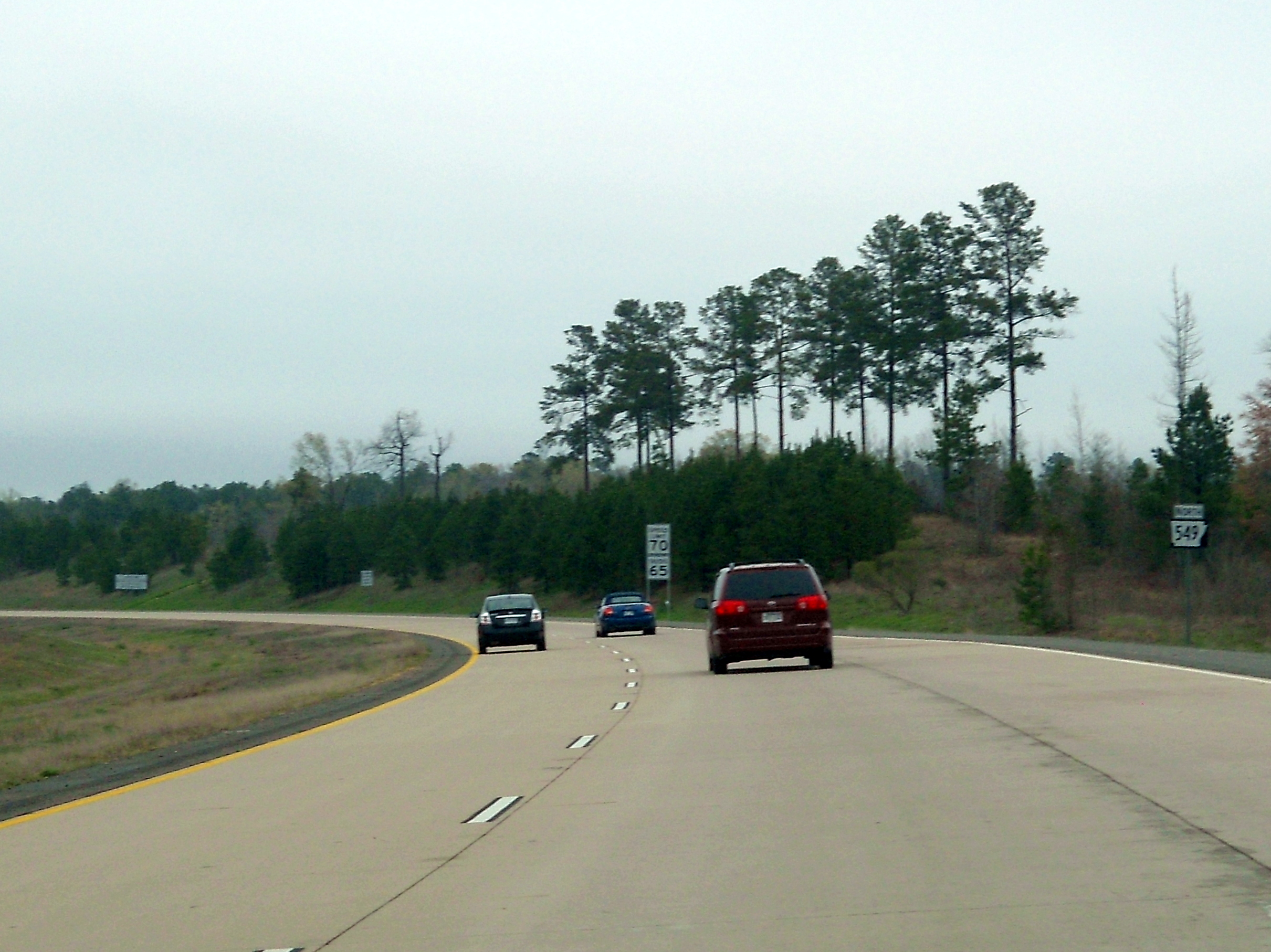
The first reassurance marker on AR 549 north of US 71 near Texarkana.

A temporary designation of AR 549 had been assigned to I-49 between US 71 north of Texarkana and Doddridge, five miles (8.0 km) from the state line.

I-49 has now been completed to the state line. "Future I-49" segments extending northward from Texarkana, Arkansas, plus segments from Doddridge south into Louisiana were shown on the official Arkansas 2013 Highway Map. The route was completed and signed as I-49 in late 2014.

==== Bella Vista Bypass ====
North of I-40, I-49 previously ended south of Bella Vista prior to October 1, 2021, about eight miles (13 km) south of the Missouri state line. Travelers were forced to travel north on 15 miles (24 km) of four-lane US 71 with intersections, traffic signals, lower speed limits, and congestion before the present northern segment of I-49 began at Pineville, Missouri. The completion of the 19-mile (31 km) "Bella Vista Bypass" between Bella Vista, Arkansas, and Pineville, Missouri filled the gap and made I-49 a continuous route from Kansas City to Alma, Arkansas.

A major hurdle to the construction of the bypass over the years was funding. The 2010 TIGER grant application submitted by the Arkansas Highway and Transportation Department (AHTD) estimated the total cost for completion in Arkansas as $291.8 million (equivalent to $420 million in 2025). The document states the portion of the bypass in Arkansas is "proposed to be constructed as a toll facility, while the Missouri portion of the Bypass will be constructed as a free route".

On August 11, 2010, the US Department of Transportation (USDOT) announced $10 million (equivalent to $14.4 million in 2025) in Transportation Investment Generating Economic Recovery (TIGER) grant funding to construct a portion of the new four-lane bypass, though the funding covered only a two-lane segment 2.5 miles (4.0 km) long. Groundbreaking occurred on July 8, 2011, with a public ceremony that included Transportation Secretary Ray LaHood, Arkansas Governor Mike Beebe, and Senator Mark Pryor. The USDOT news release refers to the project as part of the "I-49 corridor", effectively ending questions about how the new highway would be numbered. The following year, the segment between AR 72 north and County Road 34 was let. In March 2014, AHTD anticipated completion of this first segment between AR 72 north and AR 72 south in spring 2014, and the next section in autumn 2014. However, AR 549 between AR 72 and County Road 34 was not completed and opened until August 22, 2015.

Following the passing of a 10-year half-cent sales tax measure in 2012, AHTD had acquired sufficient additional revenue to fund the southbound half of the Bella Vista Bypass without tolls. Since design work had been completed prior to passing the measure, AHTD was able to let the segment between AR 72 and U.S. Route 71 Business (US 71B) in February 2014 as the first job of the Connecting Arkansas Program. AHTD anticipated completion of this project in 2016.

In 2012, Missouri still had $40 million (equivalent to $55.4 million in 2025) available for construction of its portion of the Bella Vista bypass from Pineville to the Arkansas state line. MoDOT's I-49 project manager said in an interview that "[MoDOT has] told Arkansas that whatever schedule it sets, we will meet them at the state line." However, once Arkansas began building toward the state line, it was revealed that Missouri was $25 million (equivalent to $34 million in 2025) short of the necessary funds to complete their section. A ballot initiative was defeated in August 2014 in Missouri, which put the project on hold for nearly five years.

The only Arkansas project remaining for a fully operational two-lane bypass was the 7.6-mile (12.2 km) section between County Road 34 and the Missouri state line; however, was listed as TBD by AHTD. Design work was complete for the roadway project and was anticipated to be complete in 2015 for the interchange. Construction of the roadway was anticipated to be complete in 2017, assuming a one-year delay related to Missouri funding. Construction on the interchange was tentatively scheduled to be complete in 2018. The final segment from Rocky Dell Hollow Road to the Missouri border was scheduled to be completed with all four lanes by late 2021 to meet up with the Missouri segment. Widening this segment was begun in 2020.

On May 10, 2017, a 6.4-mile (10.3 km) segment of the bypass between the existing 5-mile (8.0 km) segment near Hiwasse, Arkansas, and a new temporary roundabout interchange with I-49 and US 71 near Bentonville, Arkansas, opened after three years of construction and cost over $50 million (equivalent to $64.5 million in 2025) to complete.

In March 2019, the Missouri Highways and Transportation Commission approved funding for the completion of the Bella Vista Bypass. Construction bids were approved in early April 2020, and construction was expected to finish in Arkansas by late 2021. The remaining 4.8 miles (7.7 km) in Missouri were also slated to be completed by late 2021. Once Missouri completed this portion, the gap closed, and four contiguous lanes of freeway from the Kansas City region to Alma, Arkansas, near the Fort Smith area was completed. The Bella Vista Bypass opened to traffic on October 1, 2021.

== Future ==
=== Southern Louisiana segment ===
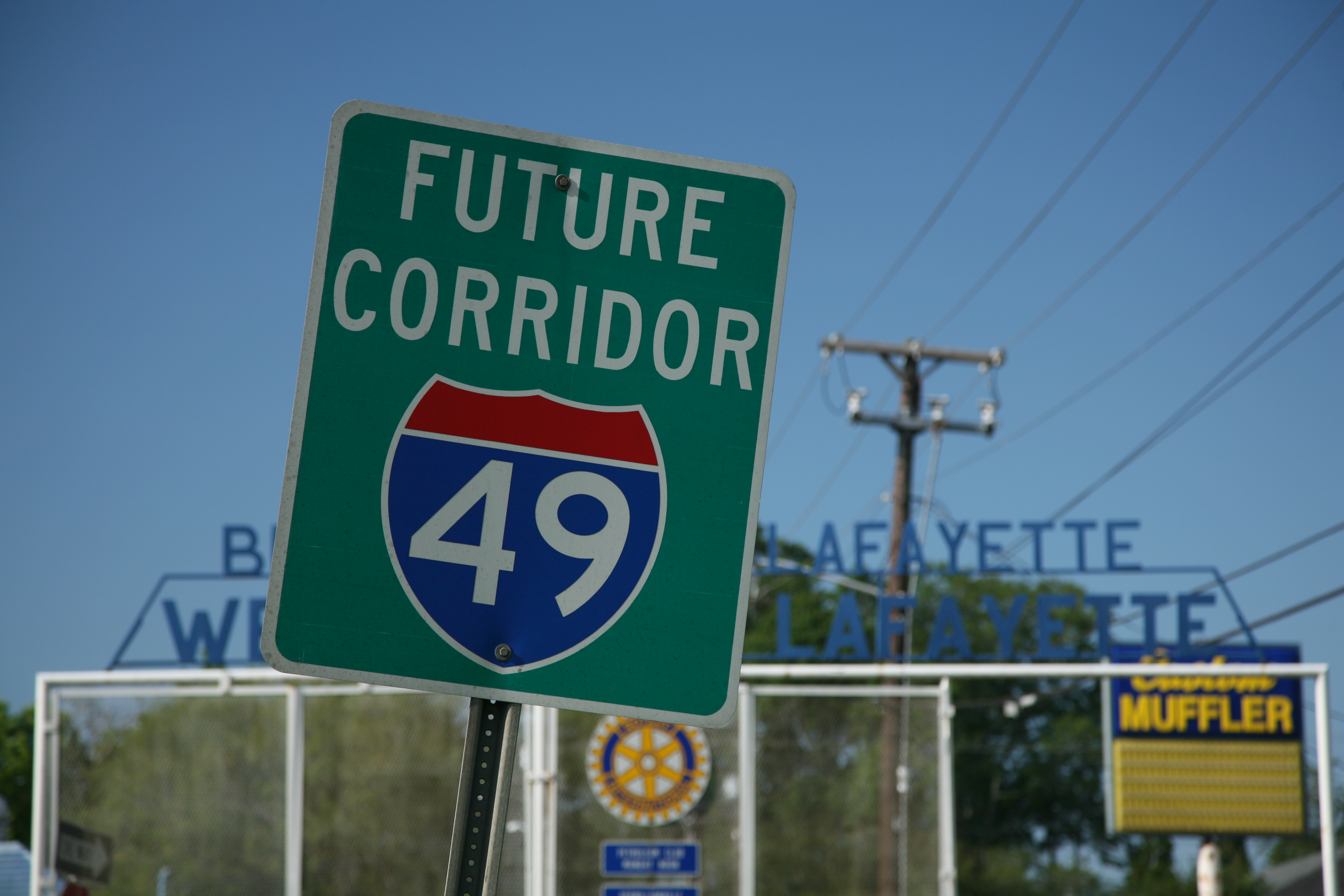
Future corridor I-49 sign in Lafayette, Louisiana

The Louisiana Department of Transportation and Development (DOTD) is working to extend I-49 from Lafayette southeast to New Orleans along the route of US 90, which is a divided four-lane highway between the two cities. This segment is listed under High Priority Corridor 37. Some portions, such as the freeway between Morgan City and the Raceland area, are already built to Interstate standards.

In the Lafayette area, the project is divided into two projects, the I-49 Lafayette Connector and the expansion of US 90 from Lafayette Regional Airport to the LA 88 interchange. The I-49 Lafayette Connector underwent a Supplemental Environmental Impact Statement study and Conceptual Design Study due to refinements to the alignment originally approved in the February 2003 Record of Decision. It is planned to be a six-lane elevated freeway, mostly utilizing the Evangeline Thruway corridor, except for a segment paralleling the BNSF/Union Pacific railroad line to serve the downtown area. Planning for this segment has been ongoing for decades, but construction has been delayed numerous times due to local opposition. The most recent attempt to begin construction was halted due to federal officials launching a civil rights investigation into the project in early 2023. The rest of the freeway from the airport to LA 88 will be an at-grade six-lane freeway with a two-mile (3.2 km) segment of eight-lane elevated freeway through the suburb of Broussard. Work on this segment began on November 15, 2022.

US 90 between LA 88 and LA 182 west of Wax Lake is already widened to Interstate standards, including a former at-grade intersection with LA 318 south of Jeanerette, which was converted to a grade-separated interchange with frontage roads for local access. From Wax Lake to the Atchafalaya River bridge at Morgan City, US 90 is a four-lane divided at-grade expressway. A supplemental environmental impact statement (EIS) is ongoing to expand that segment to interstate standards.

The Raceland–New Orleans segment of the proposed I-49 South was originally approved in 2008 with a Record of Decision for a fully elevated freeway on a mostly new alignment along the entire length. However, in 2014, DOTD launched a study to consider less expensive alternatives and to expedite design and construction of that segment. The resulting design changes greatly reduced costs by incorporating much of the existing US 90 corridor, except bypasses of Des Allemands and Paradis, and a revised connection with I-310/LA 3127.

In the New Orleans area, Interstate 49 is planned to follow the route of U.S. Route 90 Business, much of which is an elevated freeway. US 90 Business follows the Westbank Expressway through Westwego, Gretna, and Algiers before crossing the Crescent City Connection over the Mississippi River into downtown New Orleans. The route then continues onto the Pontchartrain Expressway to an interchange with Interstate 10. "Future I-49" signage is posted along US 90 and US 90 Business.

=== Shreveport gap ===
Louisiana officials are working to complete I-49 between I-20 and I-220 in Shreveport. The proposed Inner-City Connector is a 3.6-mile (5.8 km) direct route between the existing segments of I-49. An alternative proposal would reroute I-49 along existing portions of Louisiana Highway 3132 (Inner Loop Expressway) and I-220.

Opposition to the proposed route through the historic Allendale neighborhood led to a revised proposal that would still directly connect the existing segments of I-49 but bypass the neighborhood. The revised proposal was made public on January 20, 2023, and received both strong public opposition and positive feedback.

=== Texas ===
North of Texarkana, I-49 is planned to have an interchange with US 71 and US 59 and cross into Texas for about five miles (8.0 km), then turn northwest and use a new bridge across the Red River to re-enter Arkansas. The construction of the highway in Texas is not set. A north western loop from north of the I-30/I-369/US 59 interchange to planned I-49, between US 71 and the Arkansas state line, is planned according to the 2001 EIS.

=== Central Arkansas segment ===
The 180-mile (290 km) section between Texarkana and Fort Smith remains largely incomplete. Right-of-way has been acquired and engineering has been completed, but construction is contingent upon allocating funding to the corridor. After applying for and receiving assistance from the 2012 TIGER grant program, ArDOT began construction on the new path for I-49 towards US 71 south of Fort Smith, bypassing Van Buren and Fort Smith. Work is now complete between US 71 and AR 22 near Fort Chaffee as the first and southernmost phase of the extension of I-49 bypassing I-540. The project is explicitly mentioned as an effort to complete I-49 in the TIGER grant application. Colloquially referred to as "Chaffee Crossing", this first phase was completed on July 15, 2015, at the AR 549 and AR 22 interchange. A groundbreaking on the segment to I-40 occurred on October 13, 2022; this segment was estimated to cost $800 million, almost half of which is going to the bridge over the Arkansas River. Since then, the cost has increased to $1 billion. Construction on this project was to start in early 2024 and last five to six years. However, it has since been delayed to Summer 2025 as the project is not expected to be let until late-2024 or early-2025. Completion will be in 2035. Actual construction kicked off in August 2025. South of this segment, I-49 is planned to follow the general route of US 71 through the state between I-30 and I-40.

== Junction list ==
Louisiana
I-10 / US 167 in Lafayette. I-49 and US 167 travel concurrently to a point between Opelousas and Washington.
US 190 east of Opelousas
US 167 south of Lecompte
US 71 / US 167 in Alexandria. I-49 and US 167 travel concurrently into downtown Alexandria.
US 71 / US 165 in Alexandria
US 371 southwest of Coushatta
US 84 west of Grand Bayou
Future I-69 near Stonewall
LA 3132 in Shreveport. Freeway carrying through traffic bound for I-20 west and northern segment of I-49.
I-20 in Shreveport
Gap in route
I-220 in Shreveport
US 71 between Gilliam and Hosston
Arkansas
US 71 south-southeast of Doddridge
US 71 south of Fouke
US 71 in Texarkana
US 82 in Texarkana
I-30 in Texarkana
Arkansas–Texas line
US 59 / US 71 north of Texarkana
Texas
Not finished
Arkansas
US 71 in Fort Smith
Gap in route
I-40 / US 71 in Alma
US 71 in Fayetteville. The highways travel concurrently to Bentonville.
US 62 in Fayetteville. The highways travel concurrently to Bentonville.
US 412 in Springdale
US 71B / US 71 in Bentonville
Missouri
US 71 in Pineville. The highways travel concurrently to Kansas City.
US 60 in Neosho
I-44 in Joplin. The highways travel concurrently through the city.
US 160 in Lamar
US 54 in Nevada
I-435 / I-470 / US 50 / US 71 in Kansas City
