= U.S. Route 50 =

Numbered Highway in the United States

U.S. Route 50
- US 50 highlighted in red

Route information
- Length: 3,019 mi (4,859 km)
- Existed: November 11, 1926–present

Major junctions
- West end: I-80 in West Sacramento, California
- I-5 in Sacramento, California; I-15 near Fillmore, Utah; I-25 / US 85 / US 87 in Pueblo, Colorado; I-35 from Emporia to Lenexa, Kansas; I-55 in Concord, Missouri; I-65 in Seymour, Indiana; I-71 / I-75 in Cincinnati, Ohio; I-77 in Parkersburg, West Virginia; I-81 / US 11 / US 17 / US 522 in Winchester, Virginia; I-95 / I-495 in Lanham, Maryland
- East end: MD 528 in Ocean City, Maryland

Location
- Country: United States
- States: California, Nevada, Utah, Colorado, Kansas, Missouri, Illinois, Indiana, Ohio, West Virginia, Virginia, District of Columbia, Maryland

Highway system
- United States Numbered Highway System; List; Special; Divided
← US 49	→ US 51

U.S. Route 50 or U.S. Highway 50 (US 50) is a major east–west route of the U.S. Highway system, stretching 3,019 miles (4,859 km) from Interstate 80 (I-80) in West Sacramento, California, to Maryland Route 528 (MD 528) in Ocean City, Maryland, on the Atlantic Ocean. Until 1972, when it was replaced by Interstate Highways west of the Sacramento area, it extended (by way of Stockton, the Altamont Pass, and the Bay Bridge) to San Francisco, near the Pacific Ocean. The Interstates were constructed later and are mostly separate from this route. It generally serves a corridor south of I-70 and north of I-64.

The route runs through mostly rural desert and mountains in the western United States, with the section through Nevada known as "The Loneliest Road in America". In the Midwest, US 50 heads through mostly rural areas of farms as well as a few large cities including Kansas City, Missouri; St. Louis, Missouri; and Cincinnati, Ohio.

The route continues into the eastern United States, where it passes through the Appalachian Mountains in West Virginia before heading through Washington, D.C. From there, US 50 continues through Maryland as a high-speed partially limited access road. It crosses the Chesapeake Bay on the Chesapeake Bay Bridge and then continues on Maryland’s eastern shore to Ocean City.

Signs at each end give the length as 3,073 miles (4,946 km), but the current distance is lower by 54 miles (87 km) due to realignments since that figure was calculated. US 50 passes through a total of 12 states: California, Nevada, Utah, Colorado, Kansas, Missouri, Illinois, Indiana, Ohio, West Virginia, Virginia, and Maryland, as well as the District of Columbia.

US 50 was created in 1926 as part of the original U.S. Highway system. The original route planned in 1925 ran from Wadsworth, Nevada, east to Annapolis, Maryland, along several auto trails including the Lincoln Highway, Midland Trail, and the National Old Trails Road. The final 1926 plan had US 50 running from Sacramento, California, east to Annapolis with a gap in west Utah that was bridged by running the route north via Salt Lake City before rerouting it to US 6 in the 1950s. US 50 was extended west from Sacramento to San Francisco in the 1930s, replacing US 48; this was reversed in 1964 when I-580 replaced much of the route between the two cities. In addition, US 50 was extended east from Annapolis to Ocean City prior in 1949, replacing a portion of US 213. US 50 had two split configurations into US 50N and US 50S, one in Kansas and another in Ohio and West Virginia; both of these instances have been removed.

== Route description ==
Lengths
	mi	km
CA	109	175
NV	409	658
UT	335	539
CO	468	753
KS	448	721
MO	264	425
IL	166	267
IN	171	275
OH	209	336
WV	196	315
VA	86	138
DC	8	13
MD	150	240
Total	3,019	4,859

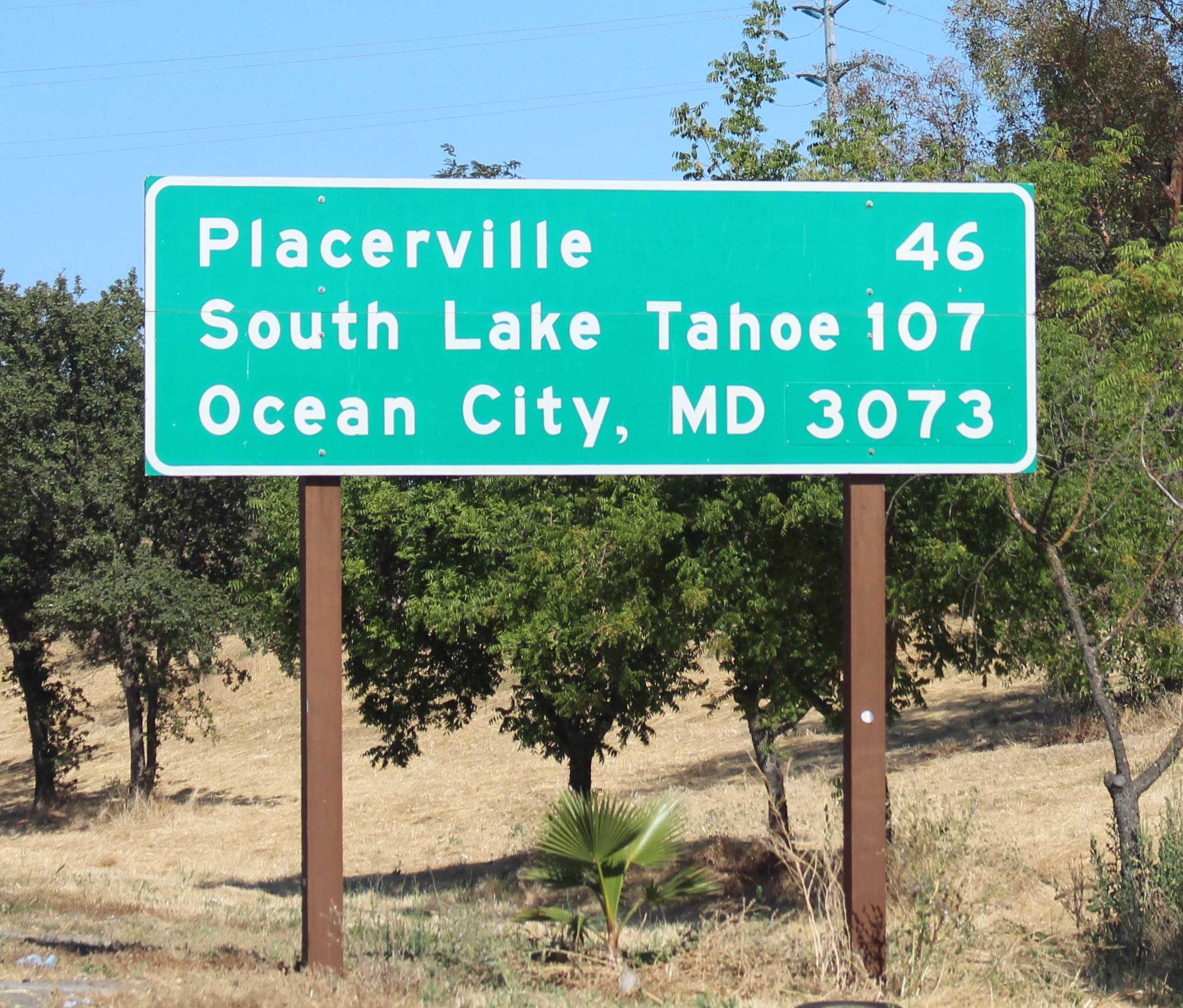
Mileage sign at the western terminus of US 50

=== Western U.S. ===
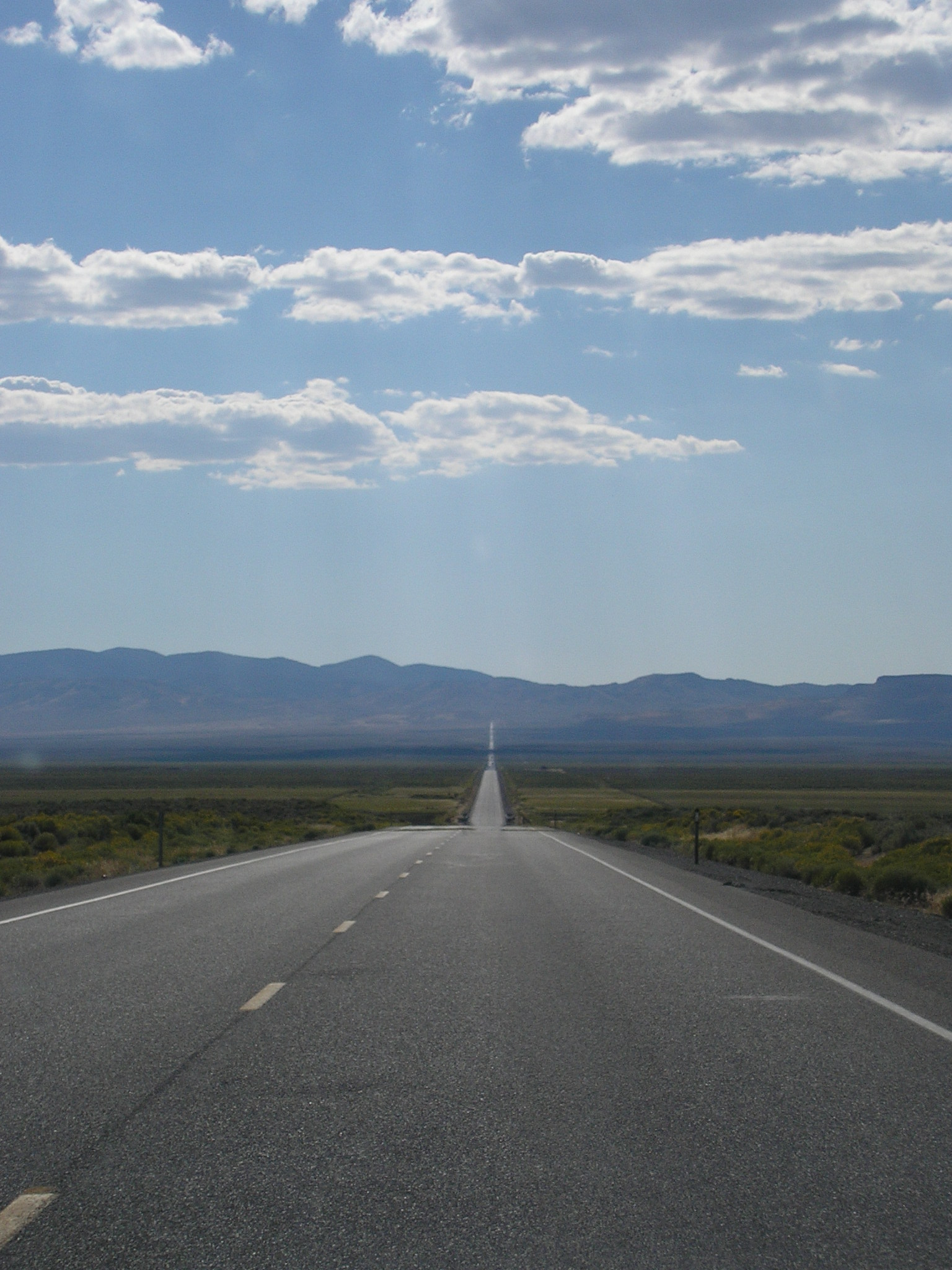
US 50 in the Nevada desert

US 50 begins as a major freeway at its junction with Interstate 80 in West Sacramento and continues into Sacramento. The portion of US 50 west of and including its interchange with California's State Highway 99 in Sacramento is also designated, but not signed as, Interstate 305. The signage along this portion of the highway indicates Business Loop I-80 and a portion of the way (2 miles/3.33 km) as California State Highway 99. From Sacramento, the highway heads eastward as the William Alexander Leidesdorff, Jr. Memorial Highway, continuing as a freeway to the Gold Country foothills, then following the American River up the Sierra Nevada as a conventional highway, until cresting the Sierras at Echo Summit and descending to Lake Tahoe, where the highway enters Nevada. In Nevada, the highway crosses a series of north–south running mountain ranges that break up the Nevada desert which are called Basin and Range. East of Carson City, the road enters the heart of the Great Basin, passing by few communities and minimal services, giving it the name "Loneliest Road in America" until reaching Utah.

In Utah, US 50 also passes through desolate, remote areas with few inhabitants. After crossing the Confusion Range via Kings Canyon and the House Range, the road traverses the north shore of the endorheic Sevier Lake. In Holden, US 50 shortly overlaps Interstate 15 to cross the Pavant Range. The road begins a much longer overlap with Interstate 70 in Salina crossing the Wasatch Plateau and San Rafael Swell into Colorado. US 50 leaves I-70 upon entering the state and heads southeast through Grand Junction and into the southern part of Colorado. Once there, the road climbs to its highest elevation of 11,312 feet (3,448 m) over the Rocky Mountains and in Monarch Pass where it crosses the Continental Divide. After descending from the Rockies, US 50 passes by Royal Gorge near Cañon City and serves Pueblo. The route then joins U.S. Route 400 in Granada and follows the Arkansas River into Kansas.

=== Midwestern U.S. ===
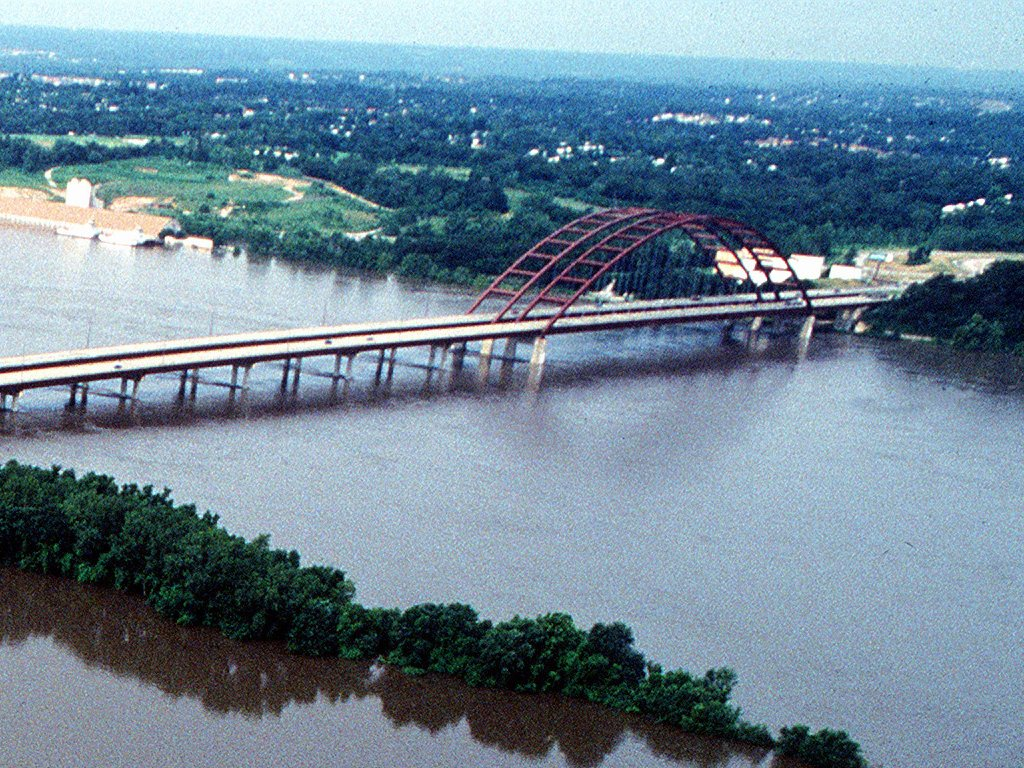
The Jefferson Barracks Bridge over the Mississippi River

Upon entering Kansas, US 50, concurrent with US 400, runs along the Arkansas River to Dodge City where US 50 splits from US 400 and takes a more northerly course. US 50 continues to traverse the farmlands and small towns of the Great Plains mostly as a straight two-lane road until Emporia where it joins Interstate 35 and splits onto Interstate 435 to bypass the center of the Kansas City Area. In Missouri, US 50 leaves I-435 for Interstate 470 splitting at Lee's Summit. US 50 runs as a four-lane divided highway across the Western Plain to Sedalia where it continues as a two-lane road until reaching California, MO about 20 miles west of Jefferson City. The road continues as a four-lane divided highway into Jefferson City where it joins US 63 just south of the Missouri River Bridge. It continues 12 miles east of Jefferson City to the Osage River where US 63 splits off to the south. It then continues as a two-lane road as it traverses the northern sections of the Ozark Highlands east to Union where it begins an overlap with Interstate 44 which goes through Pacific. The routes separate in Sunset Hills where US 50 migrates southeast bypassing St Louis by joining Interstate 255 to cross Mississippi River into Illinois.

In that state, US 50 switches to Interstate 64 before splitting onto its own alignment in eastern O'Fallon. It heads east through Trenton, Breese, Carlyle crossing the Kaskaskia River, Salem, Flora and Lawrenceville to the Wabash River along a corridor between Interstates 64 and 70. US 50 enters Indiana at the Wabash River, bypassing Vincennes and Washington and passing through Bedford, Seymour, and Versailles. It meets the Ohio River at Aurora, and soon crosses into Ohio, running through downtown Cincinnati via Fort Washington Way (Interstate 71). The route crosses southern Ohio via Hillsboro, Chillicothe, and Athens, joining the four-lane divided Corridor D (State Route 32) west of Athens. It meets the Ohio River around Belpre, and crosses the newer Blennerhassett Island Bridge (previously crossing the Parkersburg-Belpre Bridge) into greater Parkersburg, West Virginia.

=== Mid-Atlantic states ===
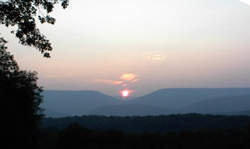
Saddle Mountain at sunrise, as viewed from Skyline atop the Allegheny Front along US 50 in West Virginia

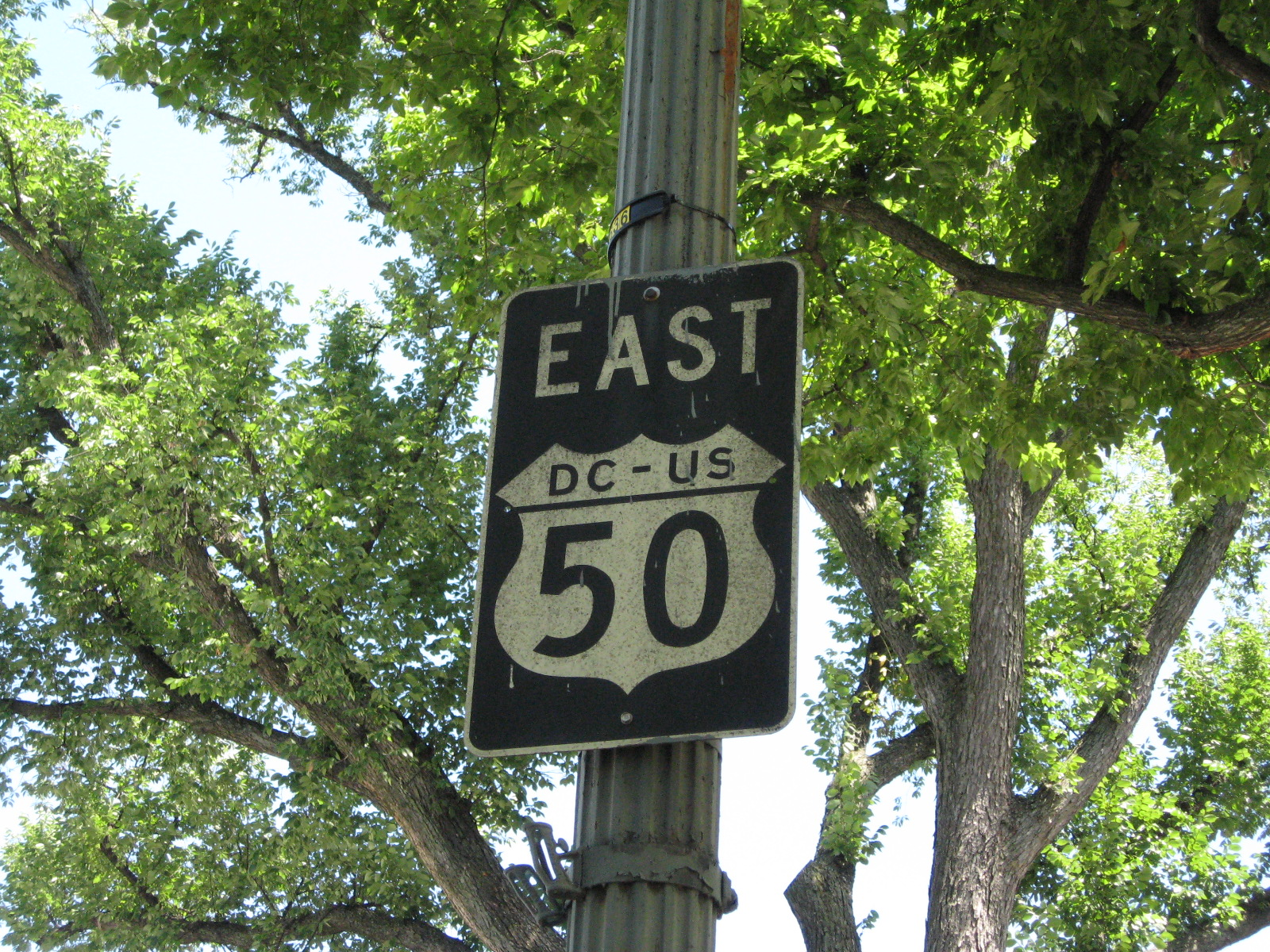
US 50 shield on Constitution Avenue in Washington, D.C.

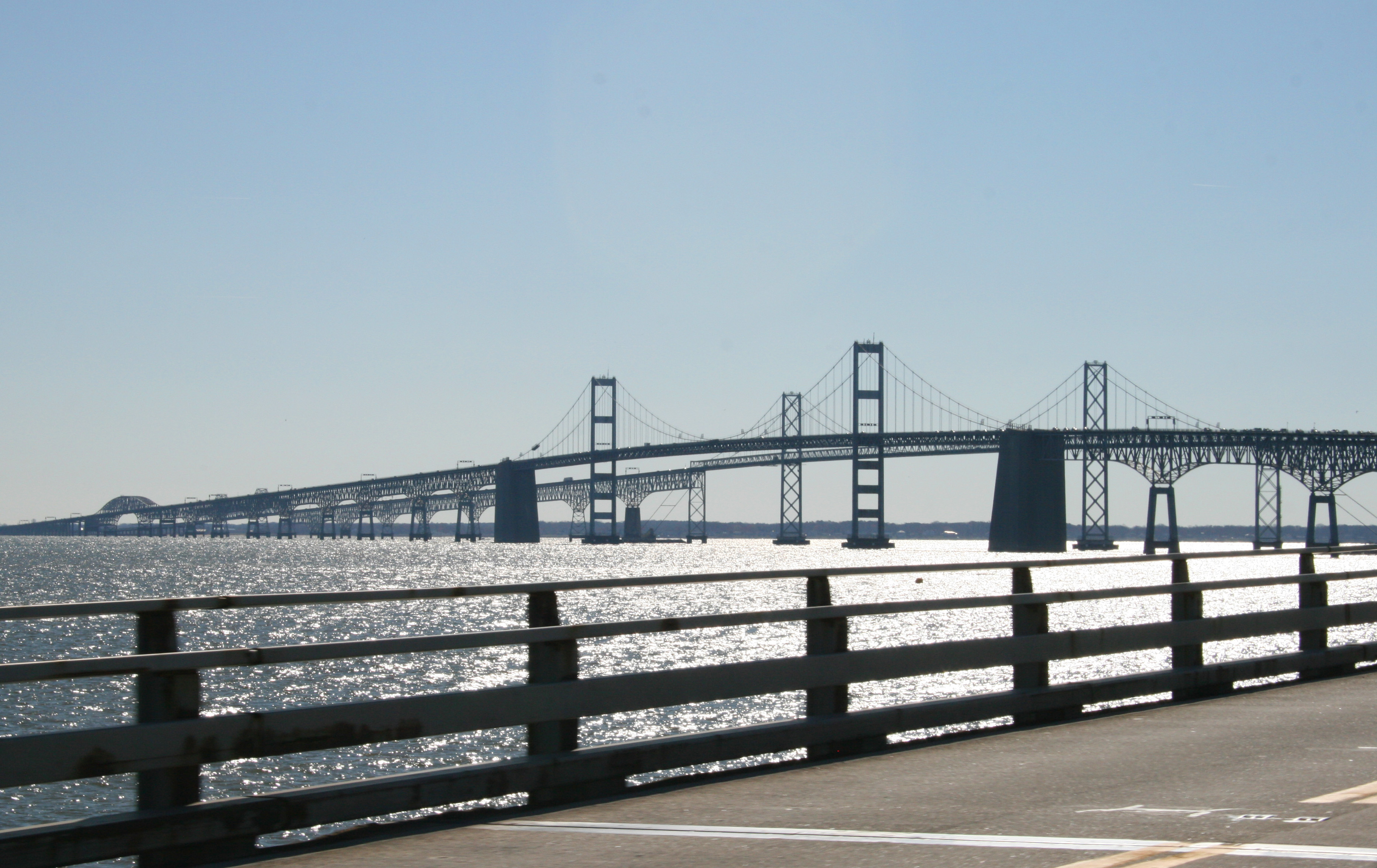
Chesapeake Bay Bridge, carrying US 50/US 301 over the bay

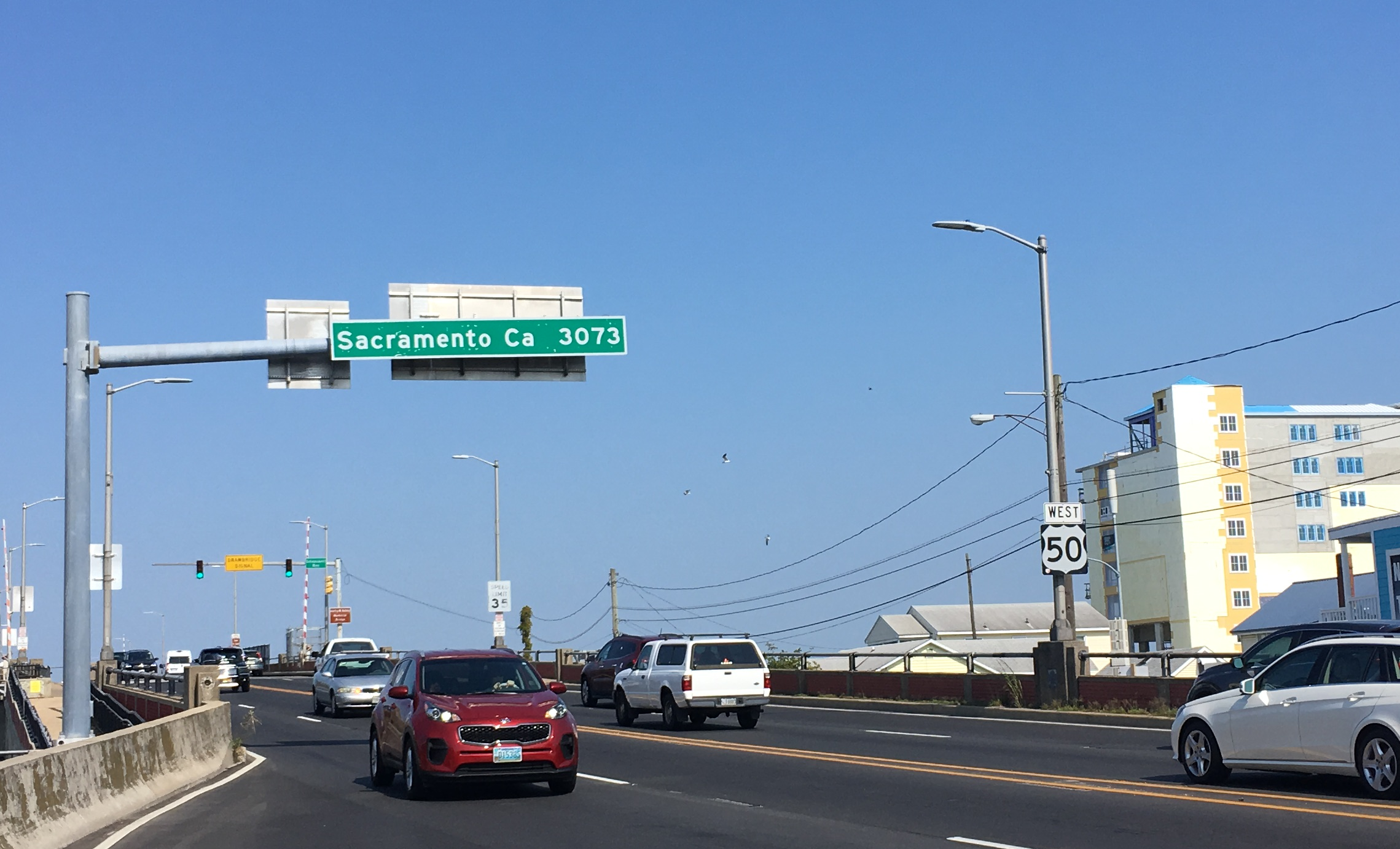
View west from the eastern terminus of US 50 in Ocean City, Maryland, with a sign listing the distance to Sacramento, California

The portion of US 50 from Parkersburg, West Virginia to Winchester, Virginia follows the historic Northwestern Turnpike, which crosses the southern tip of Garrett County, Maryland. From Parkersburg to Interstate 79 east of Clarksburg, US 50 has been upgraded as part of the four-lane divided Corridor D. US 50 is a curving two-lane mountain road, east of Clarksburg through Grafton, a bit of Maryland, and Romney to Winchester. This portion of the road is so curvy that locals claim "you can meet yourself coming." The land flattens out after the route crosses the Blue Ridge Mountain east of Winchester, and it follows the old Little River Turnpike from Aldie to Fairfax City and the newer Arlington Boulevard to Rosslyn, where it crosses the Washington, D.C. line on the west shore of the Potomac River and joins Interstate 66 on the Theodore Roosevelt Bridge.

Within the District, US 50 immediately exits the freeway onto Constitution Avenue along the north side of the National Mall and south of the White House. After turning north on 6th Street Northwest, it exits the city to the northeast on New York Avenue. Upon crossing into Maryland, it passes the south end of the Baltimore-Washington Parkway and becomes the John Hanson Highway, a freeway to Annapolis. The portion of this highway east of the Capital Beltway (I-95/I-495) is also designated, but not signed as, Interstate 595, and U.S. Route 301 joins from the south at Bowie. The freeway continues beyond Annapolis as the Blue Star Memorial Highway which crosses the Chesapeake Bay on the Chesapeake Bay Bridge and continues to Queenstown. There the Blue Star Memorial Highway continues northeast as US 301, while US 50 turns south, passing through Easton to Cambridge, and then east through Salisbury to Ocean City on the four-lane divided Ocean Gateway. US 50 ends near the Atlantic Ocean shore at Baltimore Avenue (Maryland Route 378 northbound); its westbound beginning is one block to the west, at Philadelphia Avenue (Maryland Route 528 southbound).

== History ==
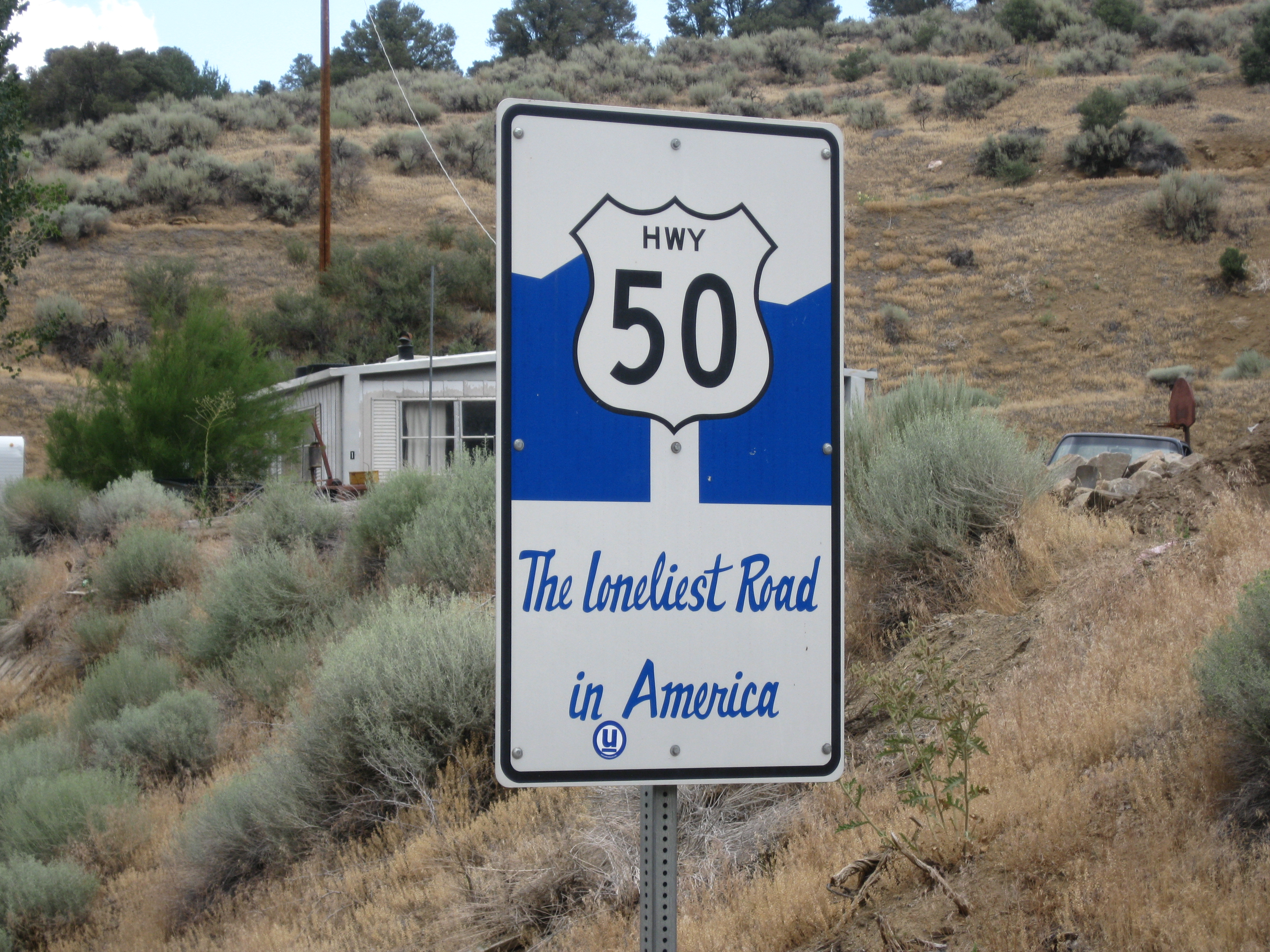
A "Loneliest Road in America" sign outside Austin, NV

Before the creation of the Interstate Highway System after World War II, US 50 was a major east–west route. Numbered highways in the United States follow a pattern of odd numbers for north–south routes and even numbers for east–west routes, hence the designation of "50" for this route. In the preliminary report, approved by the Joint Board on Interstate Highways in late 1925, US 50 ran from Wadsworth, Nevada to Annapolis, Maryland, passing through Pueblo, Colorado; Kansas City, Missouri; Tipton, Missouri; St. Louis, Missouri; Cincinnati, Ohio, and Washington, D.C. The route did not directly replace any auto trail, instead combining portions of many into one continuous route. It followed the historic Northwestern Turnpike across West Virginia, and portions of other historic roads. Major auto trails followed, including the Midland Trail in part of Indiana, Illinois, Missouri, and parts of Utah and Colorado. The National Old Trails Road (Old Santa Fe Trail) was designated in Kansas and eastern Colorado, and the Lincoln Highway was constructed in Nevada. In most states that had numbered their state highways, US 50 followed only one or two numbers across the state. (Note: The following routes were used, mostly shown on the 1926 Rand McNally: Nevada: 2; Utah: 8 (in the east half of the state; the west half was unnumbered); Colorado: 6; Kansas: state highways were not numbered prior to the U.S. Highway system; Missouri: 12, shown on Missouri State Highway Commission, Route Map Showing Designated Routes and Numbers, Approved September 19, 1922; Illinois: 12; Indiana: 4 and 5; by 1926, a short piece was 41, but this was originally part of 5, shown on the description of the 1917 Indiana State Highway Map at the Indiana University Bloomington Libraries; Ohio: mostly 26; it had been Main Market Route V in the 1910s, shown on 1914, 1915, and 1917 Ohio Transportation Maps; West Virginia: 1; Virginia: 36; it had been 6 until the 1923 renumbering, shown in the route descriptions as defined by the General Assembly on January 31, 1918; Maryland: state highways were not numbered prior to the U.S. Highway system)

One major controversy related to the preliminary route of US 50. The through route had been assigned to the Old Santa Fe Trail, while the spur U.S. Route 250 followed the competing New Santa Fe Trail to the south. As a compromise, the Joint Board on Interstate Highways approved a split configuration—U.S. Route 50N and U.S. Route 50S—in January. Another problem was in western Utah, where no improved road existed for US 50 to use. The final numbering plan, approved in November 1926, left a gap in US 50 between Ely, Nevada and Thistle, Utah. Finally, rather than ending US 50 at Wadsworth, where the Lincoln and Victory Highways merged, it was sent over the Lincoln Highway's Pioneer Branch, past the south side of Lake Tahoe, to Sacramento, California.

The gap in Utah was soon bypassed by taking US 50 to the north, crossing the Great Salt Lake Desert with U.S. Route 40 to Salt Lake City, and using long portions of U.S. Route 93 in Nevada and U.S. Route 89 in Utah. U.S. Route 6 was marked along the direct, but still partially unimproved, route in 1937; it was finally paved in 1952, and US 50 was moved to it within a few years. Another straightening was made in 1976, when US 50 in central Utah was moved south onto the new extension of Interstate 70 at the request of the National Highway 50 Federation, a group dedicated to promoting US 50. Among other things, the group has unsuccessfully pushed for an extension of Interstate 70 west along US 50 to California.

The north–south split in Kansas was eliminated in the late 1950s, with the south route—which was to be US 250—becoming part of US 50, and most of US 50N becoming part of a new U.S. Route 56. Another split was located between Athens, Ohio and Ellenboro, West Virginia from the late 1920s to the mid-1930s, when US 50 went back to its original southern route; that U.S. Route 50N is now Ohio State Route 550 and part of West Virginia Route 16.

At its west end, US 50 was extended south from Sacramento along U.S. Route 99 to Stockton and west to the San Francisco Bay Area, replacing U.S. Route 48, by the early 1930s. US 50 was officially cut back to Sacramento in the 1964 renumbering, replaced by Interstate 580, but remained on maps and signs for several more years. US 50 was extended east from Annapolis to Ocean City, Maryland in 1949, three years prior to the opening of the Chesapeake Bay Bridge in 1952; this extension replaced Maryland Route 404 between Annapolis and Wye Mills and U.S. Route 213 between Wye Mills and Ocean City. Prior to the bridge opening, US 50 used a ferry across the Chesapeake Bay between Sandy Point and Matapeake and followed present-day Maryland Route 8 between Matapeake and Stevensville before continuing east.

== Major intersections ==
California
I-80 in West Sacramento
I-5 in Sacramento
Nevada
I-580 / US 395 in Carson City. The highways travel concurrently through the city.
US 95 in Fallon. The highways travel concurrently through the city.
US 93 in Ely. The highways travel concurrently to Majors Place.
US 6 in Ely. The highways travel concurrently to Delta, Utah.
Utah
I-15 north-northeast of Holden. The highways travel concurrently to Scipio.
US 89 in Salina. The highways travel concurrently through the city.
I-70 / US 89 in Salina. I-70/US 50 travels concurrently to south-southwest of Mack, Colorado.
US 6 / US 191 west of Green River. US 6/US 50 travels concurrently to Grand Junction, Colorado. US 50/US 191 travels concurrently to west-southwest of Thompson Springs.
Colorado
I-70 in Grand Junction
US 550 in Montrose
US 285 in Poncha Springs. The highways travel concurrently through the town.
I-25 / US 85 / US 87 in Pueblo. The highways travel concurrently through the city.
US 350 in La Junta
US 287 south of Wiley. The highways travel concurrently to Lamar.
US 287 / US 385 in Lamar. US 50/US 385 travels concurrently to Granada.
US 385 / US 400 in Granada. US 50/US 400 travels concurrently to west of Dodge City, Kansas.
Kansas
US 83 north-northwest of Garden City. The highways travel concurrently to Garden City.
US 56 / US 283 in Dodge City. US 50/US 56 travels concurrently to Kinsley. US 50/US 283 travels concurrently to west-southwest of Wright.
US 183 in Kinsley
US 281 south of St. John
I-135 / US 81 in Newton. The highways travel concurrently through the city.
US 77 in Florence.
I-35 / I-335 in Emporia
I-35 east of Emporia. The highways travel concurrently to Lenexa.
US 75 south-southeast of Olivet
US 59 in Ottawa. The highways travel concurrently to northeast of Ottawa.
US 56 in Gardner. The highways travel concurrently to Lenexa.
US 169 in Olathe. The highways travel concurrently to Lenexa.
I-35 / I-435 / US 56 / US 169 in Lenexa. I-435/US 50 travels concurrently to Kansas City, Missouri.
US 69 in Overland Park
Missouri
I-49 / I-435 / I-470 / US 71 in Kansas City. I-470/US 50 travel concurrently to Lee's Summit.
US 65 in Sedalia
US 54 / US 63 in Jefferson City. US 50/US 63 travels concurrently to north of Westphalia.
I-44 south-southwest of Villa Ridge. The highways travel concurrently to the Sunset Hills–Kirkwood city line.
I-270 in Sunset Hills
I-44 / US 61 / US 67 on the Sunset Hills–Kirkwood city line. US 50/US 61/US 67 travels concurrently to Mehlville.
I-55 on the Concord–Mehlville city line.
I-255 in Mehlville. The highways travel concurrently to Caseyville, Illinois.
Illinois
I-64 / I-255 in Caseyville. I-64/US 50 travels concurrently to O'Fallon.
US 51 in Sandoval. The highways travel concurrently through the village.
I-57 in Salem
US 45 northwest of Flora. The highways travel concurrently to east of Flora.
Indiana
US 41 / US 150 in Vincennes. US 41/US 50 travels concurrently through the city. US 50/US 150 travels concurrently to Shoals.
I-69 east of Washington
US 231 in Loogootee. The highways travel concurrently through the city.
I-65 in Seymour
US 31 in Seymour
US 421 in Versailles. The highways travel concurrently through the town.
I-275 in Greendale.
Ohio
US 27 / US 42 / US 52 / US 127 in Cincinnati
I-71 / I-75 in Cincinnati. I-71/US 50 travels concurrently through the city.
I-471 in Cincinnati
US 52 in Cincinnati
US 68 in Fayetteville
US 62 in Hillsboro
US 23 / US 35 in Scioto Township. US 23/US 50 travels concurrently through the township. US 35/US 50 travels concurrently to Schrader.
US 33 in Athens. The highways travel concurrently to Athens Township.
West Virginia
I-77 east of Parkersburg
US 19 in Clarksburg
I-79 in Clarksburg
US 250 west-southwest of Pruntytown. The highways travel concurrently to Pruntytown.
US 119 in Grafton
Maryland
US 219 in Red House
West Virginia
US 220 southeast of New Creek. The highways travel concurrently to Junction.
Virginia
US 11 / US 17 / US 522 in Winchester. US 11/US 50 travels concurrently through the city. US 17/US 50 travels concurrently to Paris. US 50/US 522 travels concurrently to southeast of Winchester.
I-81 in Winchester
US 340 in Waterloo
US 15 in Gilberts Corner
I-66 in Fair Oaks
US 29 in Fairfax. The highways travel concurrently through the city.
I-495 on the Annandale–Merrifield–West Falls Church line
District of Columbia
I-66 in Washington, D.C. The highways travel concurrently through the city, to the Foggy Bottom neighborhood.
US 1 in Washington, in the National Mall. The highways travel concurrently to Mount Vernon Square.
I-395 in Washington, in Mount Vernon Square
Maryland
I-95 / I-495 in Lanham. The unsigned I-595 is entirely concurrent with US 50 from here to Annapolis.
US 301 in Bowie. The highways travel concurrently to southwest of Queenstown.
I-97 in Parole
US 13 in Salisbury. The highways travel concurrently around the northeastern corner of the city.
US 113 in Berlin
MD 528 in Ocean City

== See also ==
- U.S. Bicycle Route 50

=== Related U.S. Routes ===
- U.S. Route 150
- U.S. Route 250
- U.S. Route 350
- U.S. Route 450
- U.S. Route 550
- U.S. Route 650
- Special routes of U.S. Route 50
