= Interstate 435 Bridge =

- Coordinates: 39.0460°N 94.7896°W
- Carries: 6 lanes of I-435
- Crosses: Kansas River, BNSF Railway, UP Railroad
- Locale: Kansas City, Kansas
- Maintained by: KDOT

Characteristics
- Design: Girder

History
- Opened: 1970s

The Interstate 435 Bridge is a girder bridge crossing of the Kansas River. It carries six lanes of Interstate 435, three south, three north. It also crosses the Union Pacific Railroad tracks at the north side, and the BNSF Railway at the south.
