= Missouri Route 291 =

State highway in Missouri, U.S.

Route 291
- MO 291 highlighted in red

Route information
- Maintained by MoDOT
- Length: 49.431 mi (79.551 km)

Major junctions
- South end: I-49 / US 71 in Harrisonville
- US 50 in Lee's Summit; I-470 in Lee's Summit; US 40 in Independence; I-70 / I-470 in Independence; US 24 in Independence; I-35 / US 69 in Liberty
- North end: I-435 in Kansas City

Location
- Country: United States
- State: Missouri

Highway system
- Missouri State Highway System; Interstate; US; State; Supplemental
← Route 283	→ Route 340

Missouri Route 291 is a state highway in the western part of the U.S. state of Missouri. Its southern terminus is at I-49/US 71 in Harrisonville; its northern terminus is at I-435 in Kansas City. The route was once designated as US 71 Bypass. Route 291 serves as a main arterial road and commercial strip in Liberty and Independence.

== Route description ==
Route 291 begins in central Cass County at an interchange with I-49/US 71 in Harrisonville. Here, the roadway continues as Cantrell Road. It travels to the north, intersecting Route P (203rd Street), and past Country Creek Golf Club. It has a brief concurrency with Route 58. The two routes separate after just over 1 mile (1.6 km). Route 291 is a major highway in eastern Jackson County. In Lee's Summit, it has an interchange with Route 150. After it passes Shamrock Hills Golf Course, it has a very brief concurrency with US 50. After the two highways separate, Route 291 travels through the main part of the city and has an interchange with I-470. The two highways begin a concurrency for the remainder of I-470's length. They interchange with Strother Road, Woods Chapel Road, Lakewood Boulevard and Bowlin Road. After crossing over the Little Blue River and entering Independence, they have an interchange with US 40 (Cpl M.E. Webster Memorial Parkway) and I-70, where I-470 meets its eastern terminus. Route 291 continues to the north. It has an interchange with 39th Street. It crosses over a Kansas City Southern Railway line on the southeastern corner of Van Hook Park. After a more westerly jog, it intersects Route 78 (East 23rd Street South). Immediately after crossing over a Union Pacific Railroad line is an interchange with Truman Road. Farther along is an interchange with US 24. Route 291 passes to the west of Winterstone Golf Course and travels to the north-northwest. It crosses over Mill Creek. It then crosses over a Union Pacific Railroad line just to the west of the River Bluff Nature Preserve. The highway then crosses over the Missouri River on the Liberty Bend Bridge. On the northern shore of the river, it enters River Bend. In town is an interchange with Route 210. The highway enters Clay County and Liberty. Route 291 curves to the west and then to the northwest. It intersects the eastern terminus of Route 152 (West Kansas Street). It curves to the north and parallels I-35/US 69 before curving back to the northwest and meeting those routes at an interchange. Almost immediately is an intersection with the southern terminus of Route A (Church Road). Route 291 curves to the west and has an interchange with I-435, where it ends and turns into NE Cookingham Drive which is a road that leads to the Kansas City International Airport

== History ==
The route was renumbered in the mid-1960s when I-29 was opened.

It originally crossed the Missouri River about 2 miles (3.2 km) north of where it does now, until 1949, when the Missouri River was rerouted. The county line stayed constant, however, leaving some of Jackson County north of the river. It was aligned on what is now the western frontage road in southern Liberty, Southview Drive, until the mid-1970s, when a four-lane Route 291 was built.

Route 291 was designated as "Route 35" from 1926 to 1939, and then "US 71 Bypass" until 1972. From 1922 to 1926, Route 35 took the western route between Harrisonville and Kansas City, while Route 1 followed present Route 291; US 71 replaced that part of Route 1 in 1926, but followed what had been Route 35, and so Route 35 was moved east to replace the piece of Route 1 bypassed by US 71.

== Major intersections ==
County	Location	mi	km	Destinations	Notes
Cass	Harrisonville	0.000– 0.131	0.000– 0.211	I-49 / US 71 / Cantrell Road – Kansas City, Joplin	I-49 exit 160
Cass	Harrisonville	0.266	0.428	Rock Haven Road / Commercial Street	former US 71
Cass		6.458	10.393	Route P	
Cass		8.476	13.641	Route 58 east – Pleasant Hill	south end of Route 58 overlap
Cass		9.994	16.084	Route 58 west – Raymore	north end of Route 58 overlap
Jackson	Lee's Summit	15.507	24.956	Route 150 – Greenwood, Grandview	interchange
Jackson	Lee's Summit	16.963	27.299	US 50 west / Jefferson Street – Kansas City	interchange; south end of US 50 overlap
Jackson	Lee's Summit	17.779	28.613	US 50 east / Hamblen Road – Sedalia	interchange; north end of US 50 overlap
Jackson	Lee's Summit	21.091	33.943	I-470 west / Colbern Road	interchange; south end of I-470 overlap; Route 291 south follows exit 10B
Jackson	see I-470 (exits 10B-16)				
Jackson	Independence	27.448– 27.462	44.173– 44.196	I-70 – Kansas City, St. Louis	interchange; north end of I-470 overlap; signed as exits 16B (east) and 16C (west)
Jackson	Independence	27.901	44.902	39th Street	interchange
Jackson	Independence	30.178	48.567	Route 78 (22nd Street) – Blue River College	
Jackson	Independence	31.122	50.086	Truman Road	interchange
Jackson	Independence	32.922	52.983	US 24 – Independence, Lexington	interchange
Jackson	Missouri River	36.398	58.577	Liberty Bend Bridge	
Jackson	River Bend	37.734	60.727	Route 210 / Lewis and Clark Trail – North Kansas City, Richmond	interchange; south end of Lewis and Clark Trail overlap
Clay	Liberty	41.432	66.678	Route 33 (Leonard Street) North.	
Clay	Liberty	42.542	68.465	Lewis and Clark Trail (Withers Road) / Liberty Drive	north end of Lewis and Clark Trail overlap
Clay	Liberty	43.080	69.331	Route 152 west (Kansas Street) – Business District	
Clay	Liberty	44.656– 44.673	71.867– 71.894	I-35 / US 69 / Route 110 (CKC) – Kansas City, Cameron	I-35 exit 17
Clay	Liberty–Kansas City line	44.789	72.081	Route A (Church Road)	
Clay	Kansas City	49.283– 49.431	79.313– 79.551	I-435 – St. Louis, KCI Airport, St. Joseph	I-435 exit 36, 40 & 45
1.000 mi = 1.609 km; 1.000 km = 0.621 mi
