= Grandview Triangle =

Large highway interchange in Missouri

Coordinates: 38.93524°N 94.53220°W

3-Trails Crossing Memorial Highway
- Grandview Triangle
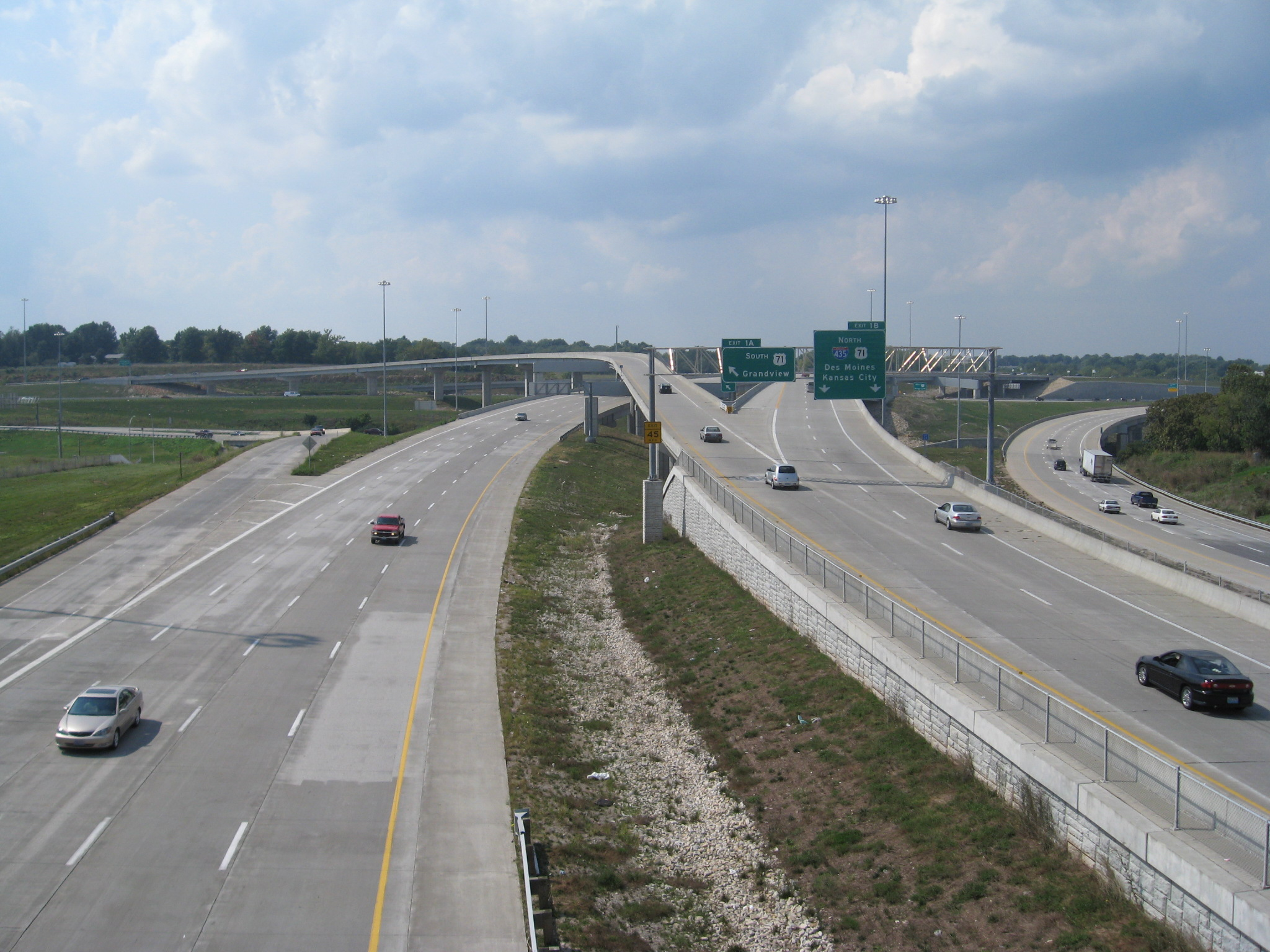
- The 3-Trails Crossing Memorial Highway as seen from the east, on the Hillcrest Road bridge over I-470, before US 71 south was upgraded to I-49.

Location
- Kansas City, Missouri
- Roads at junction: I-49 I-435; I-470; US 50 US 71

Construction
- Maintained by: Missouri Department of Transportation

The 3-Trails Crossing Memorial Highway is the official name for an interchange in south Kansas City, Missouri that was once considered one of Missouri's most congested locations. Although it is known as the Grandview Triangle, it is not located in Grandview, a suburb of Kansas City. It is actually north of Grandview, still within the city limits of Kansas City. After several years of reconstruction, the interchange itself is largely congestion free during non-peak hours despite the high traffic on the highways approaching the interchange. During rush-hour moderate to major delays and numerous accidents are reported.

The name "Three Trails Crossing" refers to the Santa Fe, Oregon, and California Trails that cross there. It is a major interchange of five major highways in the Kansas City area: I-49, I-435, I-470, US 50, US 71, and Missouri State Highway W.

I-49/US 71 brings in traffic from the southeastern suburbs of the Kansas City area in Jackson and Cass counties. I-49 currently ends at the triangle, but the road continues northwest into Kansas City as US 71. The I-49 designation went into effect in December 2012.

I-435 is a beltway around the Kansas City metropolitan area.

I-470 is a major traffic corridor that connects southern Kansas City to the suburbs of eastern Jackson County, mainly Lee's Summit.

US 50 travels concurrently with I-435 entering the Triangle, and then travels concurrently with I-470 at Exit 71A.

State Highway W, also known as Bannister Road, which forms the northern leg of the triangle, is a major east-west arterial thoroughfare through southern Kansas City, and also serves as a detour for traffic seeking an alternate route when I-435 is congested.

The 3-Trails Crossing currently handles approximately 250,000 vehicles per day. Now that the reconstruction is completed, the interchange should be able to accommodate more than 400,000 vehicles per day.
