= Missouri Route 350 =

State highway in Missouri, U.S.

Route 350

Route information
- Maintained by MoDOT
- Length: 8.589 mi (13.823 km)

Major junctions
- West end: 55th Street in Kansas City
- I-435 in Kansas City
- East end: I-470 / US 50 in Lee's Summit

Location
- Country: United States
- State: Missouri
- Counties: Jackson

Highway system
- Missouri State Highway System; Interstate; US; State; Supplemental
← Route 340	→ Route 360

Route 350 is a highway in the Kansas City, Missouri, area and is park of Blue Parkway. Its eastern terminus is at the Interstate 470/U.S. Route 50 (I-470/US 50) interchange in Lee's Summit; its western terminus is at I-435 in Kansas City. Along the northern terminus, it continues as Blue Parkway, and part of the route is an old alignment of US 50. Notable development along Route 350, particularly in and near Raytown, occurred in the late 1970s into the 1980s. However, much of this area now shows its age and the changing socioeconomic makeup of the area, with retail chains falling into disrepair or closing.

== Route Description ==
Beginning at exit 66 of I-435, in the Brown Estates neighborhood of Kansas City, Route 350 travels southeasterly through Jackson County as a divided highway. It quickly travels southeast through the Kansas City neighborhoods of Lewis Heights and East Swope Highlands before entering Raytown after about a mile. Another mile on, the median grows larger, at one point being over 1000 feet wide at the location of a Walmart Supercenter. Route 350 passes by Raytown South High School just before it leaves town and reenters Kansas City. Route 350 continues southeasterly through the Kansas City neighborhoods of Unity Ridge and Little Blue Valley, where it junctions with Route V before passing by the village of Unity Village. Finally, the route junctions with I-470 in Lee's Summit, and continues southeast as US 50.

== Major intersections ==
The entire route is in Jackson County.

All exits are unnumbered.

Location	mi	km	Destinations	Notes
Kansas City	0.000	0.000	55th Street; Blue Parkway	Continues as Blue Parkway
Kansas City	0.349– 0.669	0.562– 1.077	I-435	I-435 south exit 66, north exit 66B.
Kansas City	1.310	2.108	63rd Street – Raytown	Interchange
Raytown	2.081	3.349	Blue Ridge Boulevard	Eastbound exit and westbound entrance only
Kansas City	5.915	9.519	Route V (Noland Road)	
Unity Village	7.843	12.622	Colbern Road, Bannister Road	Blue Parkway designation exits the highway
Lee's Summit	8.533– 8.872	13.733– 14.278	I-470 / US 50 west – Wichita, St. Louis US 50 east – Sedalia	Road continues as US 50 eastbound
1.000 mi = 1.609 km; 1.000 km = 0.621 mi: Incomplete access; Route transition
