= Interstate 470 (Missouri) =

Highway in Missouri

Interstate 470
- I-470 highlighted in red

Route information
- Auxiliary route of I-70
- Maintained by MoDOT
- Length: 17.081 mi (27.489 km)
- Existed: 1970–present
- History: Completed by 1983
- NHS: Entire route

Major junctions
- West end: I-49 / I-435 / US 50 / US 71 in Kansas City
- US 50 / Route 350 in Lee's Summit; Route 291 in Lee's Summit; US 40 in Independence
- North end: I-70 / Route 291 in Independence

Location
- Country: United States
- State: Missouri
- County: Jackson

Highway system
- Interstate Highway System; Main; Auxiliary; Suffixed; Business; Future; Missouri State Highway System; Interstate; US; State; Supplemental
← Route 465	→ Route 571

Interstate 470 (I-470) is a 16.72-mile (26.91 km) loop of the Interstate Highway System that links southeast Kansas City to Independence via Lee's Summit in Jackson County, Missouri. The western terminus of the freeway is at the Grandview Triangle interchange with I-49, I-435, U.S. Route 50 (US 50), and US 71 while the northern terminus is a cloverleaf interchange with I-70. The freeway travels west to east through southern Kansas City, curving toward the north at the Lee's Summit Municipal Airport and becoming concurrent with Route 291 as the highway travels north toward Independence.

An intermediate interchange with US 50 provides access to southern Jackson County and to Raytown to the north via Route 350, a former alignment of US 50 before the construction of I-470. Plans for a southern freeway were first published in 1955, and the first portions of I-470 were completed in 1970. By 1983, the entire freeway was open to traffic. Since construction, two new interchanges have been constructed, along with the expansion of the US 50 cloverleaf. In 2010, part of the freeway was closed by the Grandview Triangle due to a landslide underneath the freeway. Between 38,000 and 75,000 vehicles use the freeway on an average day.

== Route description ==
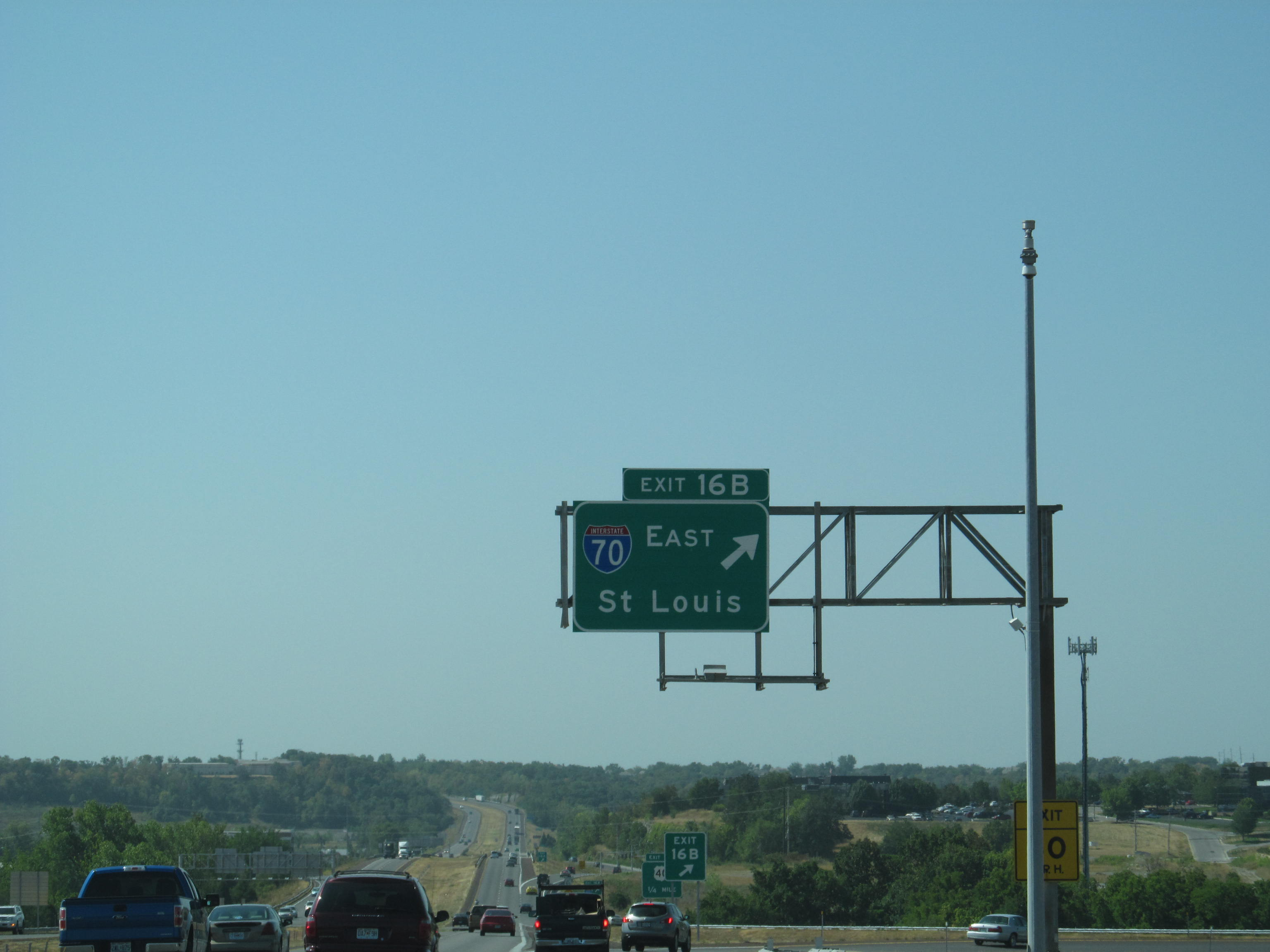
I-470 westbound at exit for I-70 eastbound at the northern terminus in Independence

I-470 begins in southern Kansas City at the Grandview Triangle interchange with I-49, I-435, US 50, and US 71. The freeway, concurrent with US 50, travels east through grasslands before meeting the westernmost interchange, a diamond interchange with Blue Ridge Boulevard. A rail line belonging to Kansas City Southern Railway passes under the freeway west of the interchange. The concurrent highways continue east through lightly populated Jackson County, past a light residential zone, toward an interchange with Raytown Road. Raytown Road provides access to Longview Lake to the south of I-470. Longview Lake was home to the Lollapalooza music festival in 1996.

Crossing into urbanized Lee's Summit, the Metropolitan Community College - Longview is accessible from the View High Drive interchange. The city line between Kansas City and Lee's Summit is near View High Drive. Exit 7 consists of a cloverleaf interchange with the southern end of Route 350 and US 50, as well as Northwest Blue Parkway and Northwest Pryor Road. Two rail lines surround the cloverleaf interchange, and, at one time, both were owned by the Union Pacific Railroad; however, only the eastern line is operational. The western line once belonged to the Chicago, Rock Island and Pacific Railroad and now is a rail trail after being sold to Jackson County. US 50 leaves the freeway and travels southeast as I-470 curves to the north near the Lee's Summit Municipal Airport.

A partial interchange with Northeast Colbern Road is quickly followed by a partial interchange with Route 291, which becomes concurrent with I-470 as it heads north toward Independence. Just north of the airport is an interchange with Strother Road, followed by an interchange with Woods Chapel Road. Lakewood Lakes, a pair of connected lakes, passes to the west of the freeway as it travels north. An interchange with Northeast Bowlin Road serves as an access road to Blue Springs Lake to the east of the freeway. US 40, which parallels I-70 through most of Missouri, is the penultimate exit, serving the southern portions of Independence and Blue Springs. US 40 is named after Corporal Michael E. Webster, a Missouri State Highway Patrol officer who was killed in the line of duty by a drunk driver. The northern terminus of I-470 is at a cloverleaf interchange with I-70 southwest of the Independence Center mall. The roadway continues north after the interchange with I-70 as Route 291 toward its ultimate end point at an interchange with I-435.

Every three years, the Missouri Department of Transportation (MoDOT) conducts a series of surveys on its highways in the state to measure traffic volume. This is expressed in terms of annual average daily traffic (AADT), which is a measure of traffic volume for any average day of the year. In 2009, MoDOT calculated that as few as 38,152 vehicles traveled along the highway at the northern terminus just north of the interchange with I-70 and as many as 75,647 vehicles used the highway just east of the Grandview Triangle. As part of the Interstate Highway System, the entire route is listed on the National Highway System, a system of roads that are important to the nation's economy, defense, and mobility.

== History ==
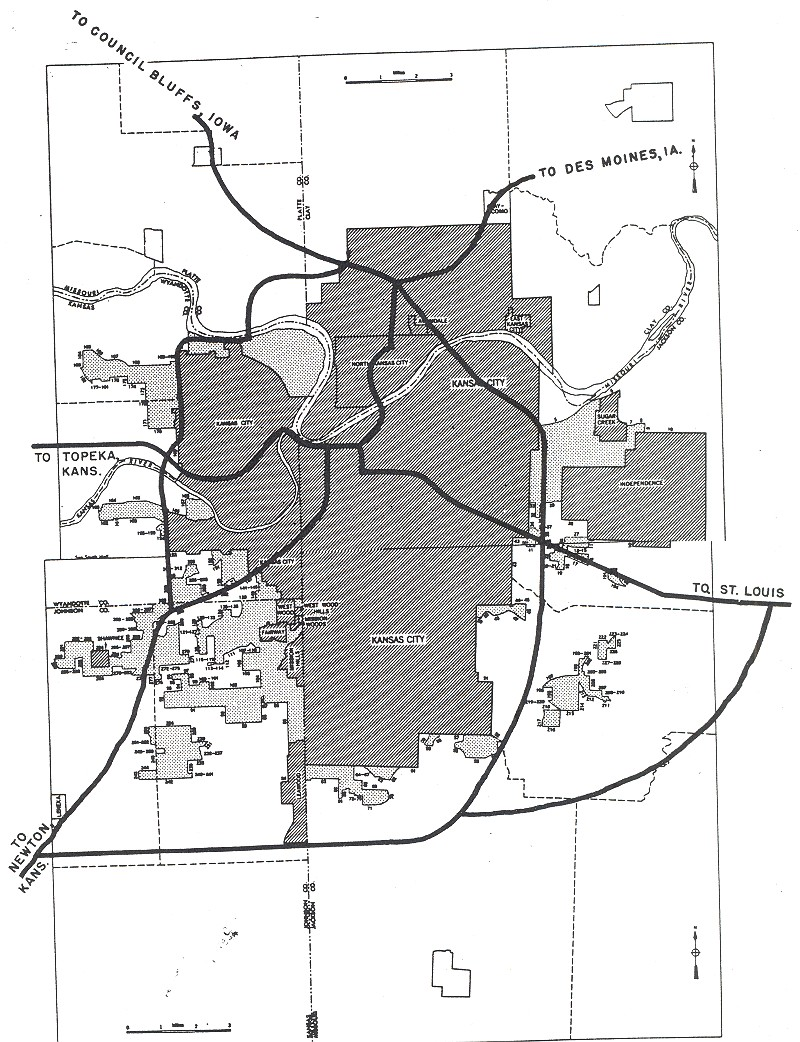
A 1955 map showing the planned freeways through Kansas City

Plans for a freeway linking southeast Kansas City to Independence were first published in 1955 in a document titled General Location of National System of Interstate Highways Including All Additional Routes at Urban Areas. The first portions of the highway that were signed I-470 were established in 1970, between I-70 and US 40 in Independence. The north–south portion of the highway, then designated US 71 Bypass (US 71 Byp.) had been in existence since 1970 and was renumbered to Route 291 between 1970 and 1971. Between 1979 and 1980, the portion of the freeway between the Grandview Triangle and the exit 7 cloverleaf had been completed. US 50's alignment was changed to follow I-470 west to the Grandview Triangle, and the old routing of US 50 was renumbered Route 350. The section of freeway between US 50 and Route 291 was opened to traffic in 1983, completing the route. Between 1980 and 1983, the portion of the route that is concurrent with Route 291 was upgraded to freeway standards and included in the I-470 loop.

Since construction of the highway, three interchanges have been added or expanded. The first addition was an interchange with View High Drive, which was constructed in early 1993, costing about $2 million (equivalent to $3.81 million in 2023) to complete. The second was an addition to the existing cloverleaf at US 50 in Lee's Summit, adding access roads to Pryor Road and Northwest Blue Parkway. Construction on that interchange began in July 2007 and was completed by September 2008. The third interchange, with Strother Road, was first planned to be constructed in 2008. The road served to provide access to the industrial park west of the freeway and to spur new development on land pending sale by the Church of Jesus Christ of Latter-day Saints to the east of the freeway. The interchange was opened to traffic in August 2010 at a final construction cost of around $18 million (equivalent to $24.6 million in 2023).

In July 2010, MoDOT closed the westbound lanes of I-470 near the Grandview Triangle due to large cracks that formed in the roadway. A buildup of ground water underneath the westbound lanes caused a 42-foot-high (13 m) retaining wall to fall or fail. A landslide occurred on July 17 which created a 35-by-200-foot (11 m × 61 m) hole in the roadway. The eastbound lanes were not affected and were not closed. The affected area was replaced by a 225-foot-long (69 m) bridge extension that opened in the following month.

== Exit list ==
The entire route is in Jackson County.

Location	mi	km	Exit	Destinations	Notes
Kansas City	0.000– 0.596	0.000– 0.959	— 1B	I-435 west / US 50 west – Wichita US 71 north – Kansas City I-435 north to I-70 west – Des Moines, Kansas City	I-435 exit 71A; Western terminus at the Grandview Triangle; western end of US 50 overlap.
Kansas City	0.615– 1.000	0.990– 1.609	1A	I-49 / US 71 south – Grandview, Joplin Red Bridge Road; Longview Road	I-49 exit number signed 183A; southern end of the Grandview Triangle; northern terminus of I-49
Kansas City	2.083	3.352	2	Blue Ridge Boulevard	
Kansas City	4.076	6.560	4	Raytown Road	
Lee's Summit	5.354	8.616	5	View High Drive	Western ramps are partially located in Kansas City; access to Longview Lake and MCC-Longview
Lee's Summit	6.637– 8.148	10.681– 13.113	7C	Pryor Road, Blue Parkway	
Lee's Summit	7.599– 7.645	12.229– 12.303	7A‑B	US 50 east / Route 350 west – Raytown, Sedalia	Eastern end of US 50 overlap; signed as exits 7A (east) and 7B (west)
Lee's Summit	9.286	14.944	9	Douglas Street, Colbern Road	Access to Truman Medical Center-Lakewood and Saint Luke's East Hospital
Lee's Summit	10.067	16.201	10A	Colbern Road	Westbound exit and northbound entrance only; orientation changes from east/west to north/south
Lee's Summit	10.318– 10.418	16.605– 16.766	10B	Route 291 south – Harrisonville	Southern end of Route 291 overlap, northbound entrance and westbound exit only
Lee's Summit	11.636	18.726	11	Strother Road	
Lee's Summit	12.644	20.349	12	Woods Chapel Road	Access to Truman Medical Center-Lakewood and Fleming Park
Lee's Summit	14.158	22.785	14	Lakewood Boulevard, Bowlin Road	
Independence	16.187– 16.198	26.050– 26.068	16A	US 40	
Independence	16.493– 17.081	26.543– 27.489	16B‑C	I-70 – Kansas City, St. Louis	I-70 exits 15A-B; northern terminus & signed as exits 16B (east) & 16C (west); cloverleaf interchange.
Independence	17.081	27.489	—	Route 291 north – Liberty	Continuation past I-70, exit 15B; northern end of Route 291 overlap
1.000 mi = 1.609 km; 1.000 km = 0.621 mi: Concurrency terminus; Incomplete access
