= U.S. Route 50 in Missouri =

Segment of American highway

U.S. Route 50
- US 50 highlighted in red

Route information
- Maintained by MoDOT
- Length: 263.58 mi (424.19 km)
- Existed: 1926–present

Major junctions
- West end: I-435 / US-50 in Leawood, KS
- I-49 / I-470 / US 71 in Kansas City; I-470 / Route 350 in Lees Summit; US 65 in Sedalia; US 54 / US 63 in Jefferson City; I-44 from Union to Kirkwood; I-270 in Sunset Hills; I-55 at the Green Park - Mehlville line; US 61 / US 67 in Kirkwood; I-255 near St. Louis
- East end: I-255 / US 50 towards Columbia, IL

Location
- Country: United States
- State: Missouri
- Counties: Jackson, Johnson, Pettis, Morgan, Moniteau, Cole, Osage, Gasconade, Franklin, St. Louis

Highway system
- United States Numbered Highway System; List; Special; Divided; Missouri State Highway System; Interstate; US; State; Supplemental
← Route 49	→ Route 51

U.S. Route 50 (US 50) is a major east–west route in the state of Missouri. It is also known as the Rex M. Whitton Expressway in the capital of Missouri, Jefferson City.

== Route description ==
US 50 enters Missouri from Kansas along Interstate 435 (I-435) around Kansas City and then it runs concurrently with I-470 to Lee's Summit. It runs as an expressway to Sedalia before becoming Broadway Boulevard and intersecting with US 65 (Limit Avenue). From Sedalia to California, US 50 becomes a two-lane undivided road, where it has a concurrency with Route 5 from Syracuse to Tipton between Morgan and Moniteau counties. It resumes as an expressway from California to Jefferson City, has a brief distance as a main road, and picks up expressway status again. It has a 15-mile-long (24 km) concurrency with US 63 for 12 miles (19 km) from Jefferson City. From just west of Linn to Union, the road is two lanes. Between Linn and Union, US 50 passes through various communities. After passing through Linn as Main Street, it shares short concurrencies with Route 89 and Route 19 between Osage and Gasconade counties and intersects with Route 47 in Union. After going through this city, US 50 is routed along I-44 up to Sunset Hills. It heads east and merges with US 61 and US 67.

These three concurrent U.S. routes run this way until after the interchange with I-55. US 61 and US 67 split off, leaving US 50 to merge with I-255 to cross the Mississippi River on the Jefferson Barracks Bridge in St. Louis.

== Future ==
US 50 is slated to become four lanes from west of Linn to I-44.

== History ==
Until 1926, US 50 in Missouri was Route 12.

== Major intersections ==
County	Location	mi	km	Exit	Destinations	Notes
Missouri–Kansas line		0.000	0.000		I-435 west / US-50 west – Wichita	Continuation into Kansas
Missouri–Kansas line		0.000	0.000	75B	State Line Road	Exit numbers follow I-435
Jackson	Kansas City	0.661	1.064	75A	Wornall Road	Access to Avila University
Jackson	Kansas City	1.416	2.279	74	Holmes Road	
Jackson	Kansas City	2.247	3.616	73	103rd Street	Westbound exit and eastbound entrance
Jackson	Kansas City	3.569– 4.748	5.744– 7.641	—	I-435 north to I-70 west – Des Moines, Kansas City I-470 begin / I-435 north – Des Moines	Eastern end of I-435 concurrency; left exits and entrances; westbound access via exit 1; western end of I-470 concurrency; I-435 exit 71A
Jackson	Kansas City	3.569– 4.748	5.744– 7.641	1	I-435 north to I-70 west – Des Moines, Kansas City US 71 / I-435 north – Kansas City, Des Moines I-49 / US 71 south / Red Bridge Road / Longview Road – Grandview, Joplin	Exit numbers follow I-470; I-435 not signed eastbound; Red Bridge Road/Longview Road not signed westbound; eastbound access to US 71 north via I-435 north
Jackson	Kansas City	5.652	9.096	2	Blue Ridge Boulevard	
Jackson	Kansas City	7.645	12.303	4	Raytown Road	
Jackson	Kansas City–Lee's Summit line	8.923	14.360	5	View High Drive	Road is in Lee's Summit, but western ramps are partially located in Kansas City; access to Longview College and Longview Lake
Jackson	Lee's Summit	10.206	16.425	—	I-470 east – St. Louis	Eastern end of I-470 concurrency; eastbound left exit and westbound left entrance; I-470 exit 7A
Jackson	Lee's Summit	10.637	17.119	7C	Pryor Road / Blue Parkway	Eastbound exit and westbound entrance
Jackson	Lee's Summit			—	I-470 east / Route 350 west – St. Louis, Raytown	Westbound exits and eastbound entrances; left exit and entrance to Route 350; I-470 exit 7A
Jackson	Lee's Summit	11.634	18.723	—	Chipman Road	
Jackson	Lee's Summit	12.816	20.625	—	3rd Street	Access to Longview Lake and Longview College
Jackson	Lee's Summit	13.893	22.359	—	Route 291 south / Jefferson St – Harrisonville	Western end of Route 291 concurrency; interchange opened on May 11, 2018
Jackson	Lee's Summit	14.652	23.580	—	Route 291 north / Hamblen Road – Independence	Eastern end of Route 291 concurrency
Jackson	Lee's Summit	15.903	25.593	—	Route RA (Todd George Rd.) – Greenwood	Access to James A. Reed Memorial Wildlife Area and Kansas City Regional Conservation Office
Jackson	Lee's Summit			—	Blackwell Road	Opened in 2017 and completed in December 2017
Jackson	Prairie–Van Buren township line	20.096	32.341	—	Route 7 – Blue Springs, Pleasant Hill	Interchange; eastern end of freeway
Jackson	Lone Jack	25.361	40.815	—	Route 150 – Lone Jack	Interchange
Johnson	Pittsville	35.618	57.322		Route 131 – Odessa, Holden	
Johnson	Centerview Township	45.893	73.858		Route 58 – Centerville	
Johnson	Warrensburg	50.317	80.977		US 50 Bus.	Western terminus of US 50 Bus.
Johnson	Warrensburg	51.438	82.781		Route 13 Bus. – Warrensburg, Higginsville	Interchange; access to the University of Central Missouri and Western Missouri Medical Center
Johnson	Warrensburg	52.618	84.680	—	US 50 Bus. (PCA Road) / Pride Avenue	Eastern terminus of US 50 Bus.; access to the Missouri Veterans Home
Johnson	Warrensburg	54.170	87.178	—	Route 13 – Clinton, Higginsville	
Johnson	Knob Noster	60.792	97.835	—	Route 23 / US 50 Bus. – Concordia, Knob Noster, Whiteman Air Force Base	Interchange; western terminus of US 50 Bus.; access to Knob Noster State Park
Johnson	Washington Township	62.547	100.660		Route D / US 50 Bus.	Eastern terminus of US 50 Bus.
Pettis	La Monte	68.284	109.892		Route 127	
Pettis	Sedalia	79.031	127.188		US 65 (Limit Avenue) to I-70 – Warsaw	
Pettis	Smithton Township	79.031	127.188		US 50 Spur / Route W south – Smithton	Northern terminus of US 50 Spur
Pettis	Smithton Township	88.752	142.832		Route 135 north – Clifton City	Western end of Route 135 concurrency
Morgan	Richland Township	91.102	146.614		Route 135 south – Florence	Eastern end of Route 135 concurrency
Morgan	Syracuse	100.849	162.301		Route 5 north – Boonville	Western end of Route 5 concurrency
Moniteau	Tipton	105.316	169.490		Route 5 south / Route B north – Bunceton, Fortuna	Eastern end of Route 5 concurrency
Moniteau	Moreau–Walker township line	114.521	184.304		US 50 Bus. – California	Western terminus of US 50 Bus.
Moniteau	California	117.673	189.376	—	Route 87 – Eldon, California	Interchange
Moniteau	Walker Township	119.093	191.662		US 50 Bus. (California Drive) / Jacket Factory Road – California	Eastern terminus of US 50 Bus.
Cole	Centertown	126.375	203.381		Route U – Centertown, Russellville	
Cole	St. Martins	130.234	209.591		Kaylor Bridge Road / Henwick Lane	At-grade intersection; western end of freeway
Cole	St. Martins	131.860	212.208	—	Route T / Route D – St. Martins, Lohman	
Cole	Jefferson Township	133.983	215.625	—	Big Horn Drive	
Cole	Jefferson Township	134.601	216.619	—	US 50 Bus. west – St. Martins, Apache Flats	Westbound exit and eastbound entrance
Cole	Jefferson City	135.937	218.769	—	S. Country Club Drive / Truman Boulevard	
Cole	Jefferson City	137.350	221.043	—	Route 179 / US 50 Bus. / Lewis and Clark Trail – Jamestown	Western terminus of US 50 Bus.; western end of Lewis and Clark Trail concurrency; access to SSM St. Mary's Hospital, Runge Nature Conservation Center, and Conservation Commission Headquarters
Cole	Jefferson City	138.956	223.628	—	Dix Road	
Cole	Jefferson City	139.954– 140.165	225.234– 225.574	—	US 54 / US 63 north – Lake of the Ozarks, Fulton, Columbia	Western end of US 63 concurrency; no westbound access to US 54 west
Cole	Jefferson City	140.242	225.698		US 50 Bus. (Missouri Boulevard) to US 54 west – Lake of the Ozarks	At-grade intersection; eastern end of freeway; eastern terminus of US 50 Bus.
Cole	Jefferson City				Monroe Street	At-grade intersection; western end of freeway
Cole	Jefferson City			—	Lafayette Street	Access to Lincoln University
Cole	Jefferson City	141.762	228.144	—	Clark Avenue	Access to Missouri State Highway Patrol General Headquarters
Cole	Jefferson City	142.915	229.999	—	Eastland Drive	Eastern end of freeway
Cole	Jefferson City	144.557	232.642	—	E. McCarty Street	
Cole	Jefferson City	147.077	236.697	—	Militia Drive	Access to Missouri National Guard Headquarters and the Missouri Military Museum
Cole	Schubert	148.887	239.610	—	Route J / Route M – Taos, Osage City	Access to Clark's Hill/Norton State Historic Site
Osage	Washington Township	152.214	244.965	—	US 63 south – Rolla	Eastern end of US 63 concurrency
Osage	Loose Creek	153.614	247.218		US 50 Byp. / Route A / Lewis and Clark Trail – Loose Creek	Partial interchange; no eastbound entrance; western terminus of US 50 Byp.; eastern end of Lewis and Clark Trail concurrency; connector road between US 50 eastbound
Osage	Linn Township				US 50 Byp. – Loose Creek	Eastern terminus of US 50 Byp.
Osage	Linn	160.352	258.062		Route 100 – Chamois	
Osage	Linn				Route U – Rich Fountain	
Osage	Linn	162.196	261.029		Route 89 – Belle	Western end of Route 89 concurrency
Osage	Crawford Township	165.540	266.411		Route 89 – Chamois	Eastern end of Route 89 concurrency
Osage	Crawford Township	164.528	264.782		Route 89 Spur	
Gasconade	Mount Sterling				Route A – Mount Sterling, Bland	
Gasconade	Boulware Township				Route K / Route P – Bay, Owensville	
Gasconade	Drake	185.294	298.202		Route 19 – Swiss, Hermann	Western end of Route 19 concurrency
Gasconade	Boeuf Township	185.887	299.156		Route 19 – Owensville	Eastern end of Route 19 concurrency
Gasconade	Rosebud	192.166	309.261		Route 28 west – Owensville	
Franklin	Beaufort	205.555	330.809		Route 185	
Franklin	Union	217.009	349.242		Route 47 north – Washington	Western end of Route 47 concurrency
Franklin	Union	217.459	349.966		Route 47 south – St. Clair	Eastern end of Route 47 concurrency
Franklin	Central Township	221.974	357.233	247	I-44 west – St. Clair, Springfield	Western end of I-44 concurrency; I-44 west exit 247
Franklin	Boles Township	221.974	357.233	247	Route O to Route AT / US 50 west – Union, Jefferson City	Exit numbers follow I-44; eastbound exit only; provides travelers from I-44 eastbound with access to US 50 westbound
Franklin	Boles Township	226.398	364.352	251	Route 100 west – Washington	Former US 66
Franklin	Gray Summit	228.202	367.256	253	I-44 BL east / Route 100 – Gray Summit	Former US 66
Franklin	Pacific	231.670	372.837	256	I-44 BL – Pacific	Signed as exit 257 westbound
St. Louis	Eureka	236.418	380.478	261	I-44 BL west / Six Flags Road – Six Flags	
St. Louis	Eureka	239.372	385.232	264	Route 109 – Eureka	
St. Louis	Eureka	240.059– 240.291	386.338– 386.711	265	Williams Road	Eastbound exit and entrance
St. Louis	Meramec Township	241.470	388.608	266	Lewis Road	
St. Louis	Meramec Township	243.701	392.199	269	Beaumont Antire Road	
St. Louis	Meramec Township	247.291– 247.304	397.976– 397.997	272	Route 141 – Fenton, Valley Park	
St. Louis	Fenton	248.757	400.336	274A	Bowles Avenue	Signed as exit 274 westbound
St. Louis	Fenton	249.577	401.655	274B	Mraz Lane	Eastbound exit and westbound entrance
St. Louis	Fenton	250.454	403.067	275	North Highway Drive, Soccer Park Road	Westbound exit and eastbound entrance
St. Louis	Sunset Hills	251.198– 251.213	404.264– 404.288	276	I-270 – Memphis, Chicago	
St. Louis	Sunset Hills	251.757	405.164	277A	Route 366 east (Watson Road)	Eastbound exit and westbound entrance; former US 66
St. Louis	Sunset Hills–Kirkwood line	252.520	406.392		I-44 east / US 61 / US 67 north (Kirkwood Road)	Eastern end of I-44 concurrency; western end of US 61/US 67 concurrency; I-44 exit 277B
St. Louis	Sunset Hills	252.739– 252.748	406.744– 406.758		Route 366 (Watson Road)	Interchange
St. Louis	Sappington	254.835	410.117		Route 30	
St. Louis	Green Park	256.644	413.028		Route 21	
St. Louis	Green Park–Mehlville line	258.091– 258.105	415.357– 415.380		I-55 to I-255 east / I-270 west – St. Louis	I-55 exit 197
St. Louis	Mehlville	258.756	416.427		US 61 / US 67 south (Lemay Ferry Road south) / Route 267 north (Lemay Ferry Road north)	Eastern end of US 61/US 67 concurrency
St. Louis	Mehlville	259.110	416.997		I-255 west	Western end of I-255 concurrency; westbound left exit and eastbound left entrance; I-255 exit 1C
St. Louis	Mehlville	260.349	418.991	2	Route 231 (Telegraph Road)	Exit numbers follow I-255
St. Louis	Mehlville	261.382	420.654	3	Koch Road	
Mississippi River		261.382– 261.946	420.654– 421.561	Jefferson Barracks Bridge		
Mississippi River		261.382– 261.946	420.654– 421.561		I-255 north / US 50 east	Continuation into Illinois
1.000 mi = 1.609 km; 1.000 km = 0.621 mi: Concurrency terminus; Incomplete access; Unopened

U.S. Route 50
Previous state: Kansas	Missouri	Next state: Illinois
