= Longview Lake =

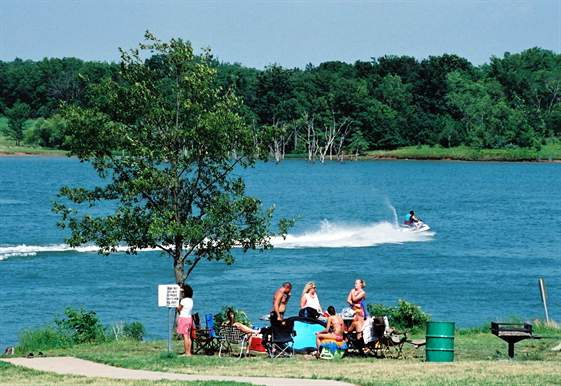

- Location within Missouri Location within the United States
- Location: Jackson County, Missouri, United States
- Coordinates: 38°54′35″N 94°28′11″W
- Type: reservoir
- Primary inflows: Little Blue River
- Primary outflows: Little Blue River
- Basin countries: United States
- Surface area: 930 acres (3.8 km^{2})
- Surface elevation: 899 ft (274 m)

Longview Lake is a 930-acre (3.8 km^{2}) freshwater reservoir in parts of Kansas City, Lee's Summit, and Grandview, all in Jackson County, Missouri. The reservoir is part of U.S. Army Corps of Engineers Little Blue River Project for flood control, recreation, and fish and wildlife conservation. The lake is located in the 4,852-acre (20 km^{2}) Longview Lake Park, which is managed by Jackson County Parks and Recreation.

== History ==
The Little Blue River Project was authorized by the U.S. Congress in 1968. Thereafter the U.S. Army Corps of Engineers purchased a portion of Longview Farm, a location once known as The World's Most Beautiful Farm. Construction on the Longview Dam began in 1979 and was completed in 1985. The park opened in 1986, and draws an average of one million visitors per year.

== Activities ==
Longview Lake offers a variety of water recreation activities:

- Boating: Power boating, jet skis and similar personal water craft are allowed on the lake. A full-service marina is available for concessions, fuel, fishing supplies, and slip rental.
- Fishing: Longview Lake is stocked with a wide variety of fish species to please anglers. They include bluegill, largemouth bass, carp, channel catfish, crappie, and walleye.
- Swimming beach: A full acre of sand makes for plenty of room to sunbathe, join in a game of beach volleyball, or enjoy the water.

The surrounding Longview Lake Park presents opportunities for camping, golf, softball, equestrian activities, picnicking, hiking and biking, and radio-controlled aircraft flying. A popular seasonal activity is "Christmas in the Park". Over 300,000 bulbs and 175 animated figures set a festive holiday mood in a free drive-through. The event, first held in 1988, draws an estimated 200,000 visitors each holiday season.

== Around the lake ==
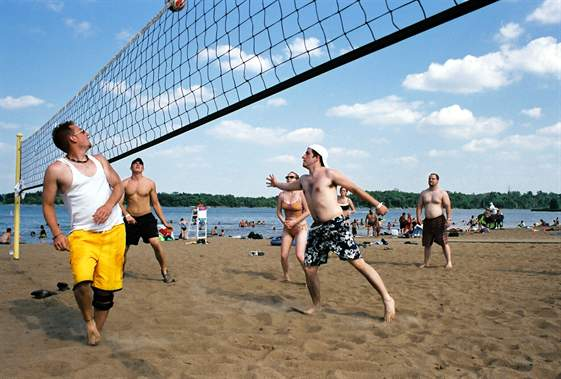
Beach volleyball is a popular activity at Longview Lake.

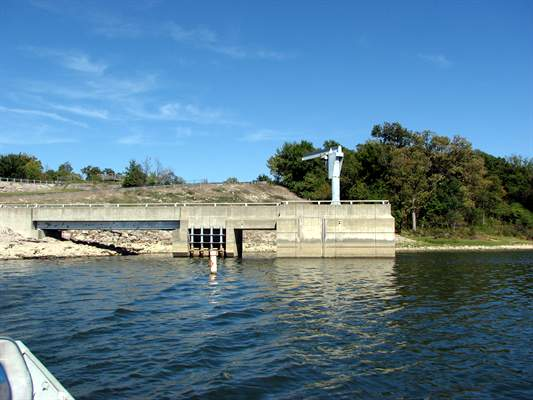
U.S. Army Corps of Engineers dam at Longview Lake.

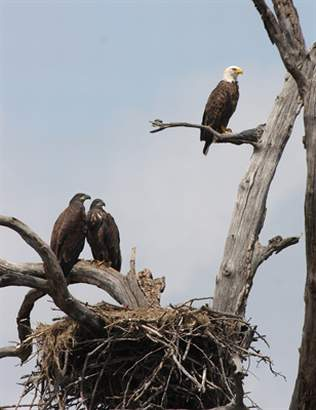
An unusual sight in a large urban area like Kansas City, these American bald eagles have made a home.

== See also ==
- Longview Farm
- Metropolitan Community College - Longview
