= Interstate 435 =

Highway in the United States

Interstate 435
- I-435 highlighted in red

Route information
- Auxiliary route of I-35
- Length: 83.02 mi (133.61 km)
- Existed: 1965–present
- NHS: Entire route

Major junctions
- Beltway around Kansas City
- I-70 / Kansas Turnpike / US-24 / US-40 in Edwardsville, KS; I-29 / US 71 in Kansas City, MO; I-35 / Route 110 (CKC) in Claycomo, MO; I-70 / US 24 / US 40 in Kansas City, MO; I-49 / I-470 / US 50 / US 71 in the Grandview Triangle; I-35 / US-50 / US-56 / US-169 in Lenexa, KS

Location
- Country: United States
- States: Kansas, Missouri
- Counties: KS: Johnson, Wyandotte; MO: Platte, Clay, Jackson

Highway system
- Interstate Highway System; Main; Auxiliary; Suffixed; Business; Future
- Kansas State Highway System; Interstate; US; State; Spurs
- Missouri State Highway System; Interstate; US; State; Supplemental
← US-400	KS	→ I-470
← Route 413	MO	→ Route 465

Interstate 435 (I-435) is an Interstate Highway beltway that encircles much of the Kansas City metropolitan area within the states of Kansas and Missouri in the United States.

== Route description ==
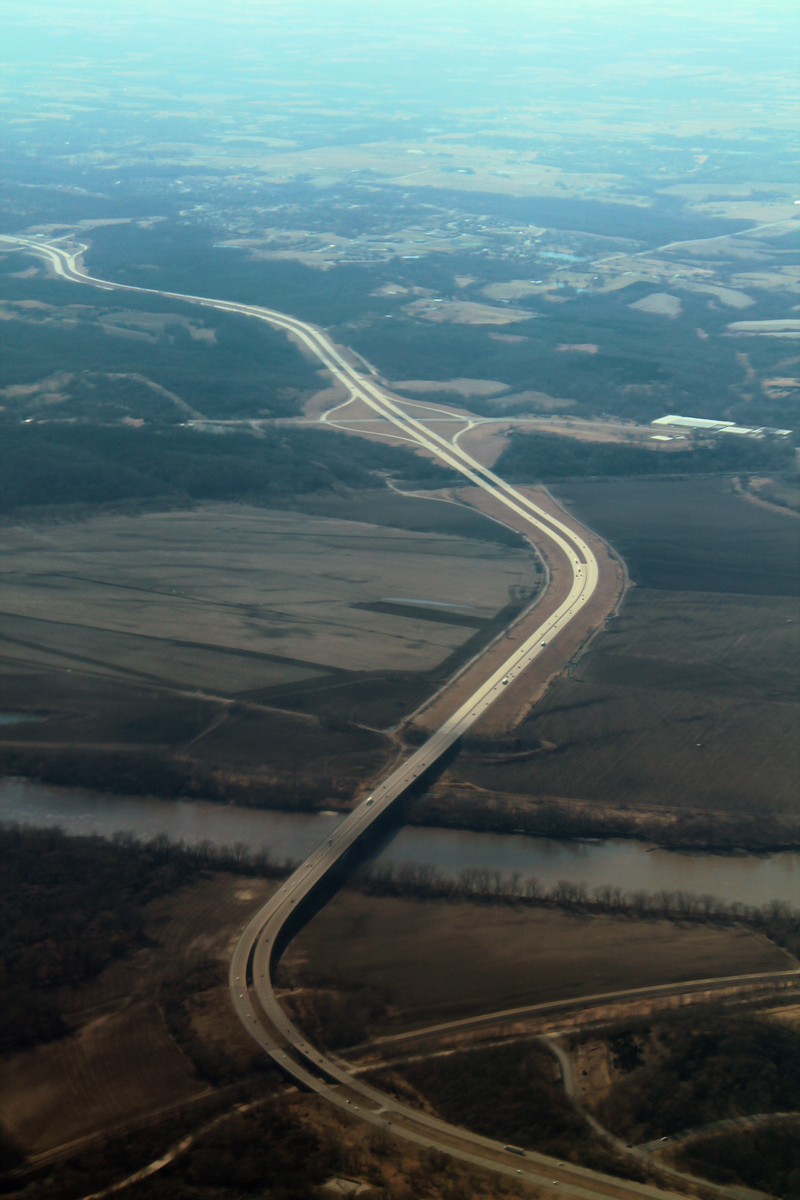
I-435 crossing the Missouri River into Kansas from Missouri

I-435, a loop route of I-35, is 83.02 miles (133.61 km) long and intersects with nearly every other Interstate Highway in the Kansas City area (except for I-635 and I-670). An additional 2.8 miles (4.5 km) near Kansas City International Airport is signed along with I-29 and U.S. Route 71 (US 71), making I-435 the second-longest complete beltway numbered as a single Interstate Highway in the US and seventh longest in the world after I-275 in Cincinnati, Ohio, at 83.71 miles (134.72 km); Beltway 8 in Houston, Texas, at 88 miles (142 km); Bundesautobahn 10 in Berlin at 122 miles (196 km); and M25 motorway in London at 117 miles (188 km); as well as 7th and 8th ring roads in Beijing. The majority—52.8 miles (85.0 km)—of I-435 is within the state of Missouri, and most of that roadway lies within the city limits of Kansas City. The first/last exit is at I-435's parent route, I-35, in Lenexa, Kansas. Going clockwise around Kansas City, the next interchange is exit 1A for Lackman Road. The milepost numbers do not start over when I-435 crosses the state line, but where it shares the same roadway as I-29, the latter's milepost (and therefore exit) numbering takes precedence.

The section of I-435 from mile marker 63.4 to mile marker 54.2 is designated as the Lamar Hunt Memorial Highway in honor of Lamar Hunt, the founder of the Kansas City Chiefs. This section of the highway passes near Arrowhead Stadium, the Chiefs' home stadium.

== History ==
I-435 in Kansas City was built piece by piece starting in the mid-1960s and was not finished until 1987.

In 1965, the first segment of I-435 was built and opened between I-35 and US 69 (which, at that time, was signed with Metcalf Avenue) near Overland Park, Kansas. A second segment was opened the same year between I-70 and US 50 in eastern Kansas City, Missouri, but the two were not connected. The eastern segment of I-435 was extended south to Gregory Boulevard and north past 22nd Street/Route 78 by 1968. By 1969, I-435 was fully built between these two segments, through southern and eastern Kansas City. The freeway was extended from 22nd Street/Route 78 to US 24 two years later. In 1973, I-435 was extended north from the former terminus of US 24 across the Missouri River to I-35 in Claycomo. It now extended halfway around the city. In 1983, a small segment was opened on the outskirts of Kansas City north between US 169 and Route 291 near Kansas City International Airport (KCI). Later, this small segment was connected with the rest of the freeway. A segment was built heading almost due north from I-35 in Claycomo to Route 291/Cookingham Drive at North Reinking Road, curving due west from there to US 169. In this year, the southwest end was also extended to K-10. In 1987, the freeway was opened all the way around the city. The northwest end was signed on I-29 for eight miles (13 km) northwest, then exited near Platte City and bore south on the west side of KCI. It crossed several small highways before crossing the Missouri River into Wyandotte County, Kansas. It continued generally south or southwest, crossed several state highways and I-70, then the Kaw River, before connecting with the former southwest end at K-10.

== Exit list ==
State	County	Location	mi	km	Exit	Destinations	Notes
Kansas	Johnson	Lenexa	0.97	1.56	1A	Lackman Road	Proposed single-point urban interchange; eastbound exit via exit 83
Kansas	Johnson	Lenexa	1.35	2.17	1B	K-10 west – Lawrence	Eastern terminus of K-10; westbound becomes northbound and southbound becomes eastbound (Note: As indicated by pull-through signs.)
Kansas	Johnson	Lenexa	2.11	3.40	2	95th Street	
Kansas	Johnson	Lenexa	2.97	4.78	3	87th Street	
Kansas	Johnson	Shawnee	5.02	8.08	5	Midland Avenue	
Kansas	Johnson	Shawnee	5.99	9.64	6	Shawnee Mission Parkway	Northbound signed as exits 6A (east) and 6B (west)
Kansas	Johnson	Shawnee	6.44	10.36	6C	Johnson Drive	
Kansas	Johnson	Shawnee	7.87	12.67	8A	Holliday Drive	
Kansas	Wyandotte	Edwardsville	8.29	13.34	8B	Woodend Road	
Kansas	Wyandotte	Edwardsville	8.99	14.47	9	K-32 – Kansas City, Bonner Springs	
Kansas	Wyandotte	Edwardsville	10.99	17.69	11	Kansas Avenue	
Kansas	Wyandotte	Edwardsville	11.98	19.28	12	I-70 / US-24 / US-40 / Kansas Turnpike west – Topeka, Kansas City, St. Louis	Northbound signed as exits 12A (east) and 12B (west); I-70 exit 411
Kansas	Wyandotte	Kansas City	12.59	20.26	13	State Avenue	Signed as exits 13A (east) and 13B (west) northbound
Kansas	Wyandotte	Kansas City	13.91	22.39	14	Parallel Parkway	Signed as exits 14A (east) and 14B (west)
Kansas	Wyandotte	Kansas City	15.02	24.17	15	K-5 south (Leavenworth Road)	Southern end of K-5 concurrency; signed as exits 15A (south/east) and 15B (west)
Kansas	Wyandotte	Kansas City	16.02	25.78	16	Donahoo Road	
Kansas	Wyandotte	Kansas City	17.98	28.94	18	K-5 north / Wolcott Drive	Northern end of K-5 concurrency
Kansas–Missouri line	Wyandotte–Platte county line		20.98– 21.35	33.76– 34.36	Missouri River crossing		
Missouri	Platte	Parkville	22.02	35.44	22	Route 45 – Weston, Parkville	
Missouri	Platte	Parkville	23.98	38.59	24	Route N / Route 152 (NW Barry Road)	Western terminus of Route 152; southern terminus of Route N
Missouri	Platte		29.02	46.70	29	Route D (NW 120th Street)	
Missouri	Platte	Platte City	31.00	49.89	31	I-29 north / US 71 north – St Joseph	Northbound becomes eastbound and westbound becomes southbound; (Note: As indicated by milemarkers.) western end of I-29 / US 71 concurrency; signed as exit 17 on northbound I-29/US 71 and westbound I-435
Missouri	Platte	Kansas City	32.49	52.29	15	Mexico City Avenue	Exit number follows I-29; access to KCI Economy Parking and Air Cargo
Missouri	Platte	Kansas City	34.02	54.75	14	I-29 south / US 71 south – Kansas City	Eastern end of I-29 / US 71 concurrency; eastbound exit and westbound entrance; exit 14 on I-29
Missouri	Platte	Kansas City	36.03	57.98	36	NW Cookingham Drive south to I-29 south / US 71 – KCI Airport	Eastbound signed as Cookingham Drive only; westbound signed to I-29 south / KCI Airport only; no access to eastbound Cookingham from westbound I-435; no access to eastbound I-435 from westbound Cookingham
Missouri	Platte	Kansas City	36.95	59.47	37	Route C (NW Skyview Avenue)	
Missouri	Platte	Kansas City	39.91	64.23	40	NW Cookingham Drive	
Missouri	Clay	Kansas City	41.11	66.16	41	US 169 (Arrowhead Trafficway) – Riverside, Smithville	Signed as exits 41A (south) and 41B (north)
Missouri	Clay	Kansas City	41.99	67.58	42	N Woodland Avenue	
Missouri	Clay	Kansas City	45.02	72.45	45	Route 291 south (NE Cookingham Drive) to I-35 north	Northern terminus of Route 291; eastbound becomes southbound and northbound becomes westbound
Missouri	Clay	Kansas City	45.89	73.85	46	NE 108th Street	
Missouri	Clay	Kansas City	47.02	75.67	47	NE 96th Street	
Missouri	Clay	Kansas City	48.99	78.84	49	Route 152 – Liberty, Topeka	Signed as exits 49A (west) and 49B (east)
Missouri	Clay	Kansas City	50.89	81.90	51	Shoal Creek Parkway	
Missouri	Clay	Kansas City	52.11	83.86	52A	US 69 to I-35 north – Claycomo	
Missouri	Clay	Claycomo	52.13	83.90	52B	I-35 south – Kansas City I-35 north / Route 110 (CKC) east – Des Moines	No southbound exit to I-35 north/Route 110 (CKC) east; no northbound entrance from I-35 south; I-35 exit 12
Missouri	Clay	Kansas City	54.10	87.07	54	48th Street, Parvin Road - Worlds of Fun	
Missouri	Clay	Randolph	54.89	88.34	55	Route 210 – Richmond, North Kansas City	Diverging diamond interchange completed in October 2018
Missouri	Clay–Jackson county line	Randolph–Kansas City line	55.34	89.06	Missouri River crossing		
Missouri	Jackson	Kansas City	56.99	91.72	57	Front Street	Diverging diamond interchange, existing interchange converted November 2011
Missouri	Jackson	Kansas City	59.03	95.00	59	US 24 east (Winner Road, Independence Avenue) – Kansas City, Independence	Eastern end of I-435 and US 24 concurrency
Missouri	Jackson	Kansas City	60.09	96.71	60	Route 12 east (Truman Road) / 12th Street – Kansas City, Independence	
Missouri	Jackson	Kansas City	61.19	98.48	61	Route 78 east (22nd Street) – Kansas City, Independence	
Missouri	Jackson	Kansas City	63.02	101.42	63	US 40 – Truman Sports Complex	Southbound exit and northbound entrance
Missouri	Jackson	Kansas City	63.02	101.42	63A	US 24 west / I-70 – Kansas City, St. Louis I-70 west to I-29 north – Downtown, St. Joseph	Western end of I-435 and US 24 concurrency; I-70 exits 8A-B; signed as exit 63A northbound and 63 southbound
Missouri	Jackson	Kansas City	63.19	101.69	63B	Raytown Road, Stadium Drive - Truman Sports Complex	Northbound exit and southbound entrance
Missouri	Jackson	Kansas City	65.10	104.77	65	Eastwood Trafficway	
Missouri	Jackson	Kansas City	66.10	106.38	66	Route 350 east – Raytown, Lee's Summit To 63rd Street	Southbound left exit and northbound entrance
Missouri	Jackson	Kansas City	66.10	106.38	66A	Blue Parkway / Dr. Martin Luther King Jr. Boulevard	Northbound exit and southbound entrance
Missouri	Jackson	Kansas City	66.08	106.35	66B	63rd Street / To; Route 350 east – Raytown	Northbound exit and southbound entrance; access to Route 350 east via 63rd Street
Missouri	Jackson	Kansas City	67.02	107.86	67	Gregory Road	
Missouri	Jackson	Kansas City	69.07	111.16	69	87th Street	
Missouri	Jackson	Kansas City	69.99	112.64	70	Route W (East Bannister Road) to US 71 north	Westbound signed Route W only
Missouri	Jackson	Kansas City	71.02	114.30	71A	I-49 south / I-470 east / US 50 east / US 71 south – Grandview, Joplin, Lee's Summit	Northern end of US 50 concurrency; I-49 exit numbers signed 183B-A; I-470 exit 1; northern terminus of I-49; southbound becomes westbound and eastbound becomes northbound (Note: As indicated by overhead guide signs.); left exit westbound
Missouri	Jackson	Kansas City	72.01	115.89	71B	US 71 north – Kansas City	Eastbound left exit and westbound entrance; I-49 exit number signed as 183C; I-470 exit 1B westbound
Missouri	Jackson	Kansas City	72.97	117.43	73	103rd Street	Westbound exit and eastbound entrance
Missouri	Jackson	Kansas City	74.04	119.16	74	Holmes Road	
Missouri	Jackson	Kansas City	74.97	120.65	75A	Wornall Road	
Missouri–Kansas line	Jackson–Johnson county line	Kansas City–Leawood line	75.51	121.52	75B	State Line Road to 103rd Street	
Kansas	Johnson	Overland Park	77.11	124.10	77A	Roe Avenue	Diverging diamond interchange converted from existing diamond interchange
Kansas	Johnson	Overland Park	77.39	124.55	77B	Nall Ave	
Kansas	Johnson	Overland Park	78.97	127.09	79	Metcalf Avenue	
Kansas	Johnson	Overland Park	80.08	128.88	80	Antioch Road	
Kansas	Johnson	Overland Park	81.06	130.45	81	US-69 – Pittsburg, Kansas City	Ramp to southbound US-69 also provides access to College Boulevard and 119th Street
Kansas	Johnson	Overland Park	81.99	131.95	82	Quivira Road	
Kansas	Johnson	Lenexa	83.02	133.61	83	I-35 / US-50 west / US-56 / US-169 – Wichita, Kansas City, Des Moines	Western end of US-50 concurrency; I-35 exit 222; access to Lackman Road via eastbound exit
1.000 mi = 1.609 km; 1.000 km = 0.621 mi: Concurrency terminus; Incomplete access; Unopened

== See also ==
- Downtown Loop (Kansas City)
