= Missouri's 17th Senate district =

American legislative district

Missouri's 17th State Senate district
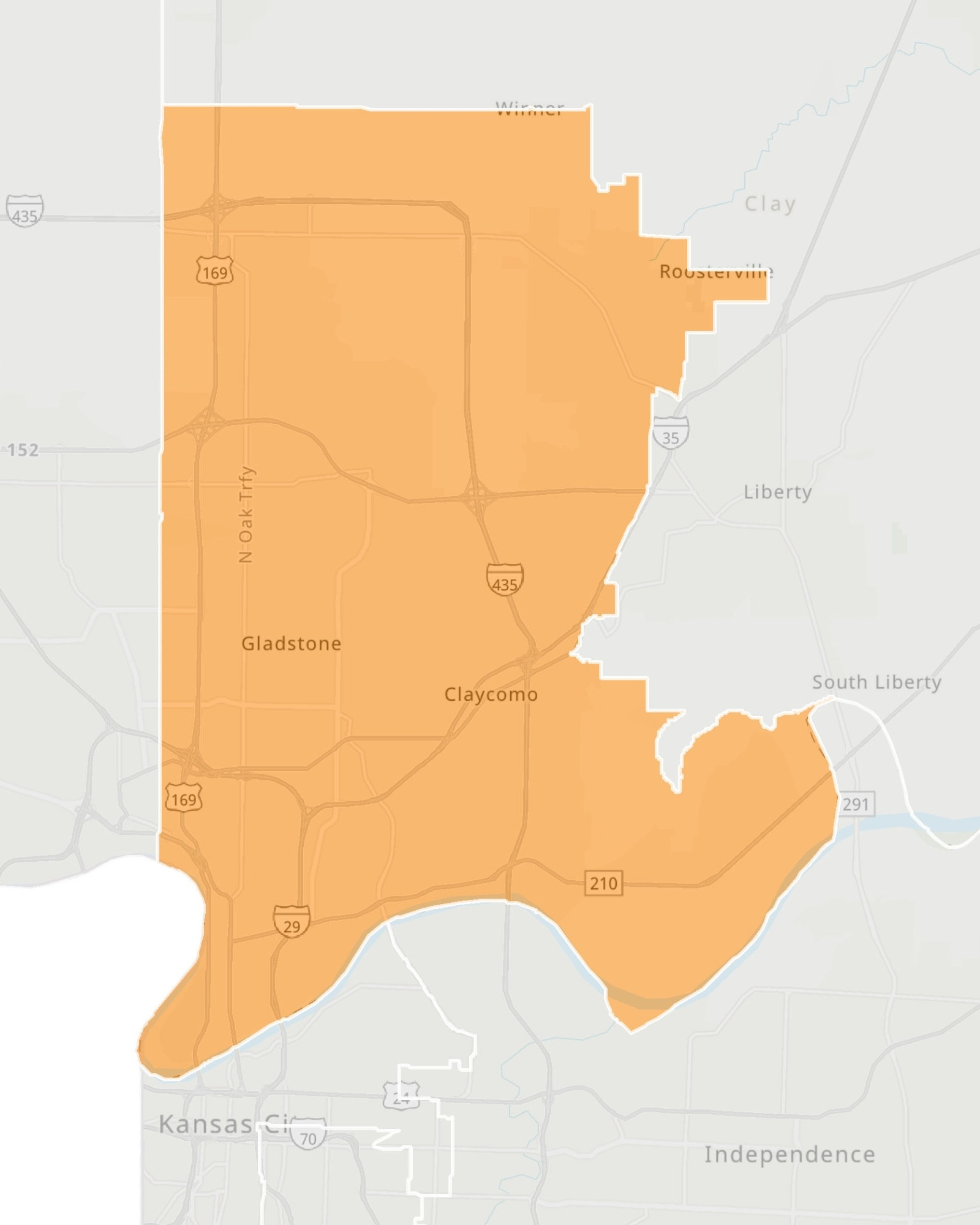
Senator
Maggie Nurrenbern; D–Kansas City
- Demographics: 73% White; 8% Black; 9% Hispanic; 3% Asian; 1% Hawaiian/Pacific Islander; 5% Multiracial
- Population (2023): 177,477

Missouri's 17th Senatorial District is one of 34 districts in the Missouri Senate. The district has been represented by Democrat Maggie Nurrenbern since 2025.

== Geography ==
The district is based in the Kansas City metropolitan area. The district is in southwestern Clay County, with major municipalities including Claycomo, Gladstone, North Kansas City, and Pleasant Valley. The district is also home to Charles B. Wheeler Downtown Airport, Oceans of Fun, and Worlds of Fun.

== Election results (1996–2024) ==
=== 1996 ===
Missouri's 17th Senatorial District election (1996)
Party	Candidate	Votes	%
Democratic	Edward E. Quick	42,546	63.13
Republican	Duke McDonald	24,844	36.87
Total votes		67,390	100.00

=== 2000 ===
Missouri's 17th Senatorial District election (2000)
Party	Candidate	Votes	%
Democratic	Edward E. Quick (incumbent)	47,870	61.66
Republican	Christopher D. Neff	29,766	38.34
Total votes		77,636	100.00
Democratic hold			

=== 2004 ===
Missouri's 17th Senatorial District election (2004)
Party	Candidate	Votes	%
Republican	Luann Ridgeway	44,179	52.83
Democratic	Philip O. Willoughby	39,443	47.17
Total votes		83,622	100.00
Republican gain from Democratic			

=== 2008 ===
Missouri's 17th Senatorial District election (2008)
Party	Candidate	Votes	%
Republican	Luann Ridgeway (incumbent)	50,451	53.09
Democratic	Sandra Aust	44,578	46.91
Total votes		95,029	100.00
Republican hold			

=== 2012 ===
Missouri's 17th Senatorial District election (2012)
Party	Candidate	Votes	%
Republican	Ryan Silvey	42,491	52.79
Democratic	Sandra Reeves	37,997	47.21
Total votes		80,488	100.00
Republican hold			

=== 2016 ===
Missouri's 17th Senatorial District election (2016)
Party	Candidate	Votes	%
Republican	Ryan Silvey (incumbent)	51,262	61.26
Democratic	J. Ranen Bechthold	32,422	38.74
Total votes		83,684	100.00
Republican hold			

=== 2018 ===
Missouri's 17th Senatorial District special election (2018)
Party	Candidate	Votes	%
Democratic	Lauren Arthur	14,675	59.66
Republican	Kevin Corlew	9,923	40.34
Total votes		24,598	100.00
Democratic gain from Republican			

=== 2020 ===
Missouri's 17th Senatorial District election (2020)
Party	Candidate	Votes	%
Democratic	Lauren Arthur (incumbent)	51,690	53.38
Republican	Mickey Younghanz	45,141	46.62
Total votes		96,831	100.00
Democratic hold			

=== 2024 ===
Missouri's 17th Senatorial District election (2024)
Party	Candidate	Votes	%
Democratic	Maggie Nurrenbern	44,709	53.00
Republican	Jerry Nolte	39,650	47.00
Total votes		84,359	100.00
Democratic hold			

== Statewide election results ==
Year	Office	Results
2008	President	Obama 51.4 – 47.2%
2012	President	Romney 51.5 – 48.5%
2016	President	Trump 48.7 – 45.0%
2016	Senate	Kander 53.2 – 41.6%
2016	Governor	Koster 50.6 – 45.9%
2018	Senate	McCaskill 53.1 – 43.6%
2020	President	Biden 52.0 – 45.9%
2020	Governor	Galloway 51.0 – 46.6%
