= Lauren Arthur =

American politician

Member of the Missouri Senate from the 17th district
- In office September 12, 2018 – July 21, 2024
- Preceded by: Ryan Silvey
- Succeeded by: Maggie Nurrenbern

Member of the Missouri House of Representatives from the 18th district
- In office January 7, 2015 – September 12, 2018
- Preceded by: Jay Swearingen
- Succeeded by: Wes Rogers

Personal details
- Party: Democratic Party
- Education: Smith College (BA); University of Missouri–St. Louis (M.Ed.)

Lauren Arthur is an American politician and former schoolteacher from the state of Missouri. She is a former member Missouri State Senate for District 17 and a former member of the Missouri House of Representatives. A member of the Democratic Party, she won a special election to succeed Ryan Silvey on June 5, 2018.

== Biography ==
Arthur is from Kansas City. She graduated from the International Baccalaureate program at North Kansas City High School. Arthur earned her Bachelor of Arts degree from Smith College in 2010 and her Master of Education from the University of Missouri–St. Louis. She taught through Teach For America.

Arthur was first elected to the Missouri House in 2014 and took office in 2015. In the 2018 special election for Missouri State Senate District 17, which covers most of Kansas City suburb Clay County, Arthur defeated her Republican opponent, fellow Missouri state representative Kevin Corlew, by a 20-point margin. She replaced Republican Ryan Silvey, who won re-election to the seat in 2016 by 20 points, before he stepped down to join Missouri's public service commission. Republican presidential candidates Mitt Romney and Donald Trump had each won the district by four points.

Arthur resigned from the Missouri Senate in July 2024 after being appointed to the Missouri Labor and Industrial Relations Commission.

== Electoral history ==
=== State representative ===
Missouri House of Representatives Primary Election, August 5, 2014, District 18
Party	Candidate	Votes	%	±%
Democratic	Lauren Arthur	1,936	73.47%	
Democratic	Kevin Garner	699	26.53%	

Missouri House of Representatives Election, November 4, 2014, District 18
Party	Candidate	Votes	%	±%
Democratic	Lauren Arthur	4,284	56.20%	−43.80
Republican	Robert (Bob) Rowland	3,339	43.80%	+43.80

Missouri House of Representatives Election, November 8, 2016, District 18
Party	Candidate	Votes	%	±%
Democratic	Lauren Arthur	12,734	100.00%	+43.80

=== State Senate ===
Missouri Senate Special Election, June 5, 2018, District 17
Party	Candidate	Votes	%	±%
Democratic	Lauren Arthur	14,675	59.66	+20.92
Republican	Kevin Corlew	9,923	40.34	−20.92

Missouri Senate General Election, November 3, 2020, District 17
Party	Candidate	Votes	%	±%
Democratic	Lauren Arthur	51,690	53.38	−6.28
Republican	Mickey Younghanz	45,141	46.62	+6.28
