= Oakwood =

Oakwood may refer to:

== Places ==
in Australia

- Oakwood, Queensland, a locality in the Bundaberg Region

in Canada

- Oakwood, Ontario
- Oakwood-Vaughan, Toronto, Ontario, a neighbourhood
  - Oakwood Collegiate Institute, a public high school in the southern end of the Oakwood-Vaughan neighbourhood

in the United Kingdom

- Oakwood, Derby, a housing estate and electoral ward in Derby, England
- Oakwood, Leeds, area of the city
- Oakwood, London, part of Enfield
  - Oakwood (Enfield ward)
  - Oakwood tube station
- Oakwood, Warrington, a neighbourhood in Birchwood, Warrington, Cheshire
- Oakwood Park, Essex
- Oakwood Theme Park in Pembrokeshire, Wales
- Oakwood (HM Prison), a prison near Wolverhampton

in the United States (by state)

- Oakwood University, located in Huntsville, Alabama
- Oakwood, a neighborhood in Venice, Los Angeles
- Oakwood, Georgia
- Oakwood, Illinois
- Oakwood, Steuben County, Indiana
- Oakwood Estate, a historic house in Winchester, Kentucky also known as Oakwood, listed on the National Register of Historic Places (NRHP)
- Oakwood, Maryland
- Oakwood (Harwood, Maryland), NRHP-listed in Anne Arundel County
- Oakwood, Missouri
- Oakwood Park, Missouri
- Oakwood, Hannibal, Missouri
- Oakwood (Wrightstown, New Jersey), NRHP-listed in Burlington County
- Oakwood, Staten Island, New York, a neighborhood in New York City
- Historic Oakwood, North Carolina, a neighborhood in Raleigh
- Oakwood, Cuyahoga County, Ohio
- Oakwood, Montgomery County, Ohio
- Oakwood, Paulding County, Ohio
- Oakwood, Oklahoma
- Oakwood, an incorporated area in Lawrence County, Pennsylvania
- Oakwood, a neighborhood in Pittsburgh, Pennsylvania
- Oakwood, Texas
- Oakwood, Virginia
- Oakwood, Milwaukee County, Wisconsin
- Oakwood, Winnebago County, Wisconsin

== Music ==
=== Bands ===
- Oakwood (band), an emo band from Texas

=== Songs ===
- "Oakwood", a song by Angus & Julia Stone from Snow
- "Oakwood", a song by The Redding Brothers

== See also ==
- Oakwood Academy (disambiguation)
- Oakwood Cemetery (disambiguation)
- Oakwood School (disambiguation)
- Oakwood mutiny, an attempted coup in the Philippines in 2003
- "The Abbey in the Oakwood", painting by Caspar David Friedrich
