= Senator Quick =

Senator Quick may refer to:

- Dan Quick (born 1957), Nebraska State Senate
- Edward Quick (1935–2016), Missouri State Senate
- William F. Quick (1885–1966), Wisconsin State Senate
