= Antioch Middle School =

Antioch Middle School may refer to:

- Antioch Middle School in Antioch, California
- Antioch Upper Grade (Middle) School in Antioch, Illinois
- Antioch Middle School in Gladstone, Missouri, a suburb of Kansas City
- Antioch Middle School in Antioch, Tennessee
