= Winnetonka High School =

Location
- 5815 NE 48 Street in Kansas City, Missouri
- Coordinates: 39.179°N 94.509°W

Information
- Type: Public
- Motto: "Together ... nurturing the pursuit of ethical and intellectual living at the highest levels"
- Established: 1971
- School district: North Kansas City School District
- Principal: Edward Tate
- Staff: 87.97 (FTE)
- Grades: 9-12
- Enrollment: 1,254 (2023–2024)
- Student to teacher ratio: 14.25
- Colors: Cardinal red and gold
- Mascot: Griffins
- Nickname: Tonka
- Rivals: (Informal: HS Names Acronym); SNOW; Staley High School; North Kansas City High School; Oak Park High School; Winnetonka High School
- Newspaper: The Griffin Rites
- Website: Winnetonka High School

Winnetonka High School is a high school in the North Kansas City School District.

The school is located at 5815 NE 48 Street in Kansas City, Missouri. Winnetonka opened in 1971. Originally built to hold 2,000 students, it now has approximately 1,270. In Fall 2008, some of Winnetonka's students were transferred to the district's new high school, Staley High School, as well as North Kansas City High School due to boundary changes.

Its boundary includes the communities of Birmingham, Claycomo, Pleasant Valley, and Randolph.

== Academic programs ==
Winnetonka currently offers 3 diploma programs: a basic diploma, a "College Preparation" diploma, and a "Gold Medallion" honors diploma. Winnetonka also participates in the A+ Program.

== Athletics ==
Competitive Teams Include:

- Men's and Women's teams
  - Soccer
  - Swimming and Diving
  - Tennis
  - Golf
  - Track and Field
  - Cross Country
  - Cheerleading
  - Volleyball
  - Wrestling
- Men's only
  - Baseball
  - Football
- Women's only
  - Softball
  - Pom/Dance Squad

== Notable alumni ==
- Scott Speicher, US Navy Captain, first combat casualty of the Persian Gulf War
- Tom Funk, former MLB player (Houston Astros)
- Matt Larson, founder and CEO of Confio Software
