= Oakwood, Ohio =

Oakwood is the name of the following places in the U.S. state of Ohio:

- Oakwood, Montgomery County, Ohio, a city
- Oakwood, Cuyahoga County, Ohio, a village
- Oakwood, Paulding County, Ohio, a village
- Oakwood (Newark, Ohio), a Gothic revival house listed on the National Register of Historic Places

== See also ==
- Oakwood (disambiguation)
