= Staley High School =

High school in Kansas City, Missouri, US (2008–)

Location
- 2800 N.E. Shoal Creek Parkway in Kansas City, Missouri; 39°17′18″N 94°32′38″W

Information
- Type: Public
- Motto: Together...Traditions...Staley Strong
- Established: August 18, 2008
- School district: North Kansas City School District
- Principal: Dr. Barry Crilley
- Staff: 99.73 (FTE)
- Enrollment: 2,006 (2023–2024)
- Student to teacher ratio: 20.11
- Colors: Green, Black, Silver
- Mascot: Falcon
- Rivals: North Kansas City High School; Winnetonka High School; Oak Park High School
- Website: Staley High School

Staley High School is a public high school in Kansas City, Missouri. It is one of the four high schools in the North Kansas City School District along with North Kansas City High School, Oak Park High School, and Winnetonka High School. The school was named after the nearby Staley Farms. The school opened in the 2008–09 school year with an enrollment of nearly 1,000 students from Oak Park High School. The school's mascot is the Falcon, and the school's colors are green, black, and silver.

== Facilities ==
The District Activities Complex (DAC) for district activities such as a football and track stadium, baseball and softball fields, a soccer field, a cross-country course, and tennis courts are behind the Staley campus.
