= Oaks, Missouri =

- Village
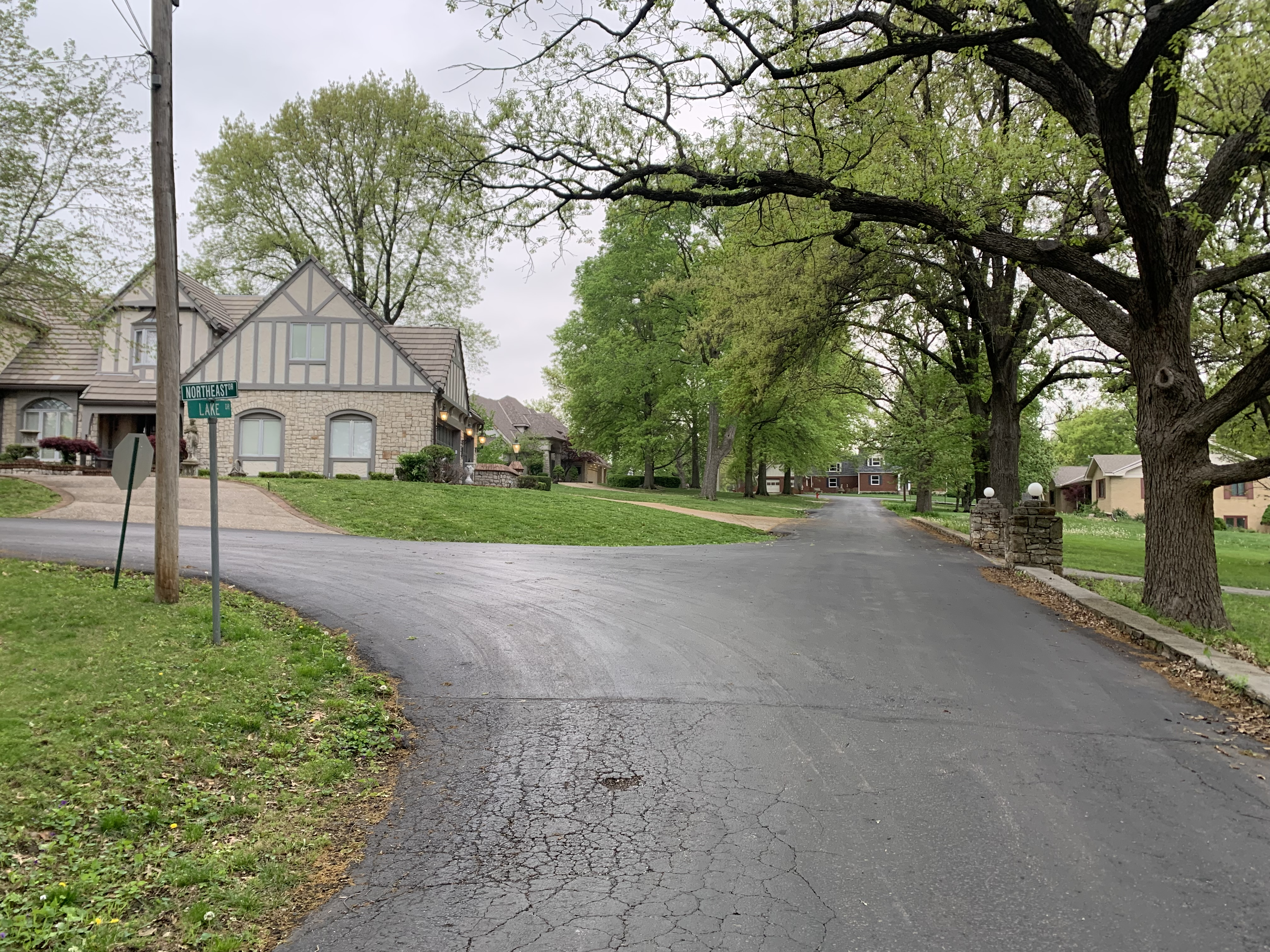
- Neighborhood in Oaks

- Location of Oaks, Missouri
- Coordinates: 39°11′49″N 94°34′19″W
- Country: United States
- State: Missouri
- County: Clay

Area
  - Total: 0.089 sq mi (0.23 km^{2})
  - Land: 0.089 sq mi (0.23 km^{2})
  - Water: 0 sq mi (0.00 km^{2})
- Elevation: 955 ft (291 m)

Population (2020)
  - Total: 128
  - Density: 1,412.6/sq mi (545.39/km^{2})
- Time zone: UTC-6 (Central (CST))
  - Summer (DST): UTC-5 (CDT)
- FIPS code: 29-53804
- GNIS feature ID: 2399544
- Website: www.villageofoaks.com

Oaks is a village in Clay County, Missouri, United States. The population was 128 at the 2020 census. It is part of the Kansas City metropolitan area.

== Geography ==
According to the United States Census Bureau, the village has a total area of 0.09 square miles (0.23 km^{2}), all land.

Oaks is bordered by Gladstone on its west side, the north and east sides are bounded by Oakwood, and the south side borders the Davidson neighborhood of Kansas City.

== Government ==
As of 2026 the board of trustees hosts meetings online via Zoom.

Previously the board of trustees of Oaks met at the city hall of Oakview.

== Demographics ==
Historical population
Census	Pop.	Note	%±
1960	159		—
1970	162		1.9%
1980	126		−22.2%
1990	130		3.2%
2000	136		4.6%
2010	129		−5.1%
2020	128		−0.8%
U.S. Decennial Census

=== Racial and ethnic composition ===
Oaks village, Missouri – Racial and ethnic composition Note: the US Census treats Hispanic/Latino as an ethnic category. This table excludes Latinos from the racial categories and assigns them to a separate category. Hispanics/Latinos may be of any race.
Race / Ethnicity (NH = Non-Hispanic)	Pop 2000	Pop 2010	Pop 2020	% 2000	% 2010	% 2020
White alone (NH)	125	116	106	91.91%	89.92%	82.81%
Black or African American alone (NH)	2	1	0	1.47%	0.78%	0.00%
Native American or Alaska Native alone (NH)	0	0	0	0.00%	0.00%	0.00%
Asian alone (NH)	0	1	0	0.00%	0.78%	0.00%
Native Hawaiian or Pacific Islander alone (NH)	0	0	0	0.00%	0.00%	0.00%
Other race alone (NH)	2	0	0	1.47%	0.00%	0.00%
Mixed race or Multiracial (NH)	3	1	3	2.21%	0.78%	2.34%
Hispanic or Latino (any race)	4	10	19	2.94%	7.75%	14.84%
Total	136	129	128	100.00%	100.00%	100.00%

=== 2010 census ===
As of the census of 2010, there were 129 people, 54 households, and 43 families living in the village. The population density was 1,433.3 inhabitants per square mile (553.4/km^{2}). There were 57 housing units at an average density of 633.3 per square mile (244.5/km^{2}). The racial makeup of the village was 97.7% White, 0.8% African American, 0.8% Asian, and 0.8% from two or more races. Hispanic or Latino of any race were 7.8% of the population.

There were 54 households, of which 29.6% had children under the age of 18 living with them, 72.2% were married couples living together, 7.4% had a female householder with no husband present, and 20.4% were non-families. 18.5% of all households were made up of individuals, and 11.1% had someone living alone who was 65 years of age or older. The average household size was 2.39 and the average family size was 2.67.

The median age in the village was 48.4 years. 18.6% of residents were under the age of 18; 2.4% were between the ages of 18 and 24; 23.3% were from 25 to 44; 34.8% were from 45 to 64; and 20.9% were 65 years of age or older. The gender makeup of the village was 48.8% male and 51.2% female.

=== 2000 census ===
As of the census of 2000, there were 136 people, 56 households, and 45 families living in the village. The population density was 1,429.2 inhabitants per square mile (551.8/km^{2}). There were 57 housing units at an average density of 599.0 per square mile (231.3/km^{2}). The racial makeup of the village was 94.12% White, 1.47% African American, 2.21% from other races, and 2.21% from two or more races. Hispanic or Latino of any race were 2.94% of the population.

There were 56 households, out of which 30.4% had children under the age of 18 living with them, 75.0% were married couples living together, 5.4% had a female householder with no husband present, and 19.6% were non-families. 16.1% of all households were made up of individuals, and 5.4% had someone living alone who was 65 years of age or older. The average household size was 2.43 and the average family size was 2.73.

In the village, the population was spread out, with 19.9% under the age of 18, 2.9% from 18 to 24, 30.1% from 25 to 44, 29.4% from 45 to 64, and 17.6% who were 65 years of age or older. The median age was 44 years. For every 100 females, there were 81.3 males. For every 100 females age 18 and over, there were 91.2 males.

The median income for a household in the village was $72,500, and the median income for a family was $76,131. Males had a median income of $44,375 versus $45,000 for females. The per capita income for the village was $26,823. There were 2.4% of families and 2.1% of the population living below the poverty line, including no under eighteens and 20.0% of those over 64.

== Education ==
North Kansas City School District is the area school district. It is zoned to Oakwood Manor Elementary School in Gladstone, Antioch Middle School in Gladstone, and Oak Park High School in Kansas City.

Metropolitan Community College has the North Kansas City school district in its taxation area.
