= Maple Woods Natural Area =

Protected area in Missouri, US

- IUCN category V (protected landscape/seascape)
- Location within Missouri Location within the United States
- Location: Clay County
- Nearest city: Gladstone, Missouri
- Coordinates: 39.231125°N 94.548288°W
- Area: 39.3 acres (15.9 ha)
- Established: 1978
- Governing body: Missouri Department of Natural Resources
- Website: Maple Woods

U.S. National Natural Landmark
- Designated: 1978

The Maple Woods Natural Area is a natural area located in Clay County in the U.S. state of Missouri. The natural area is characterized by sugar maples. The 39.3-acre forest is recognized by the United States National Park Service as a Significant Natural Area. The small forest is a National Natural Landmark.

The Maple Woods, purchased by the state of Missouri in 1978, was designated as a natural area in 1980. Owned by the Missouri Department of Conservation (MDOC), the small forest is in the suburban municipality of Gladstone, Missouri and is maintained by the Gladstone park staff by agreement with MDOC. The Maple Woods also contains a significant subpopulation of bitternut hickory as a reminder of its former standing as an oak-hickory forest. In the absence of wildfire, the oak trees of this small forest are thinning out due to mesic succession.

The Maple Woods Natural Area is on NE 76th Street adjacent to Shoal Creek. With the bright colors displayed by the sugar maple, Kansas City media recommends the Maple Woods as a place to enjoy local, accessible fall foliage colors.
