= Ramona Riley-Bozier =

American volleyball and softball coach

Current position
- Title: Head coach
- Team: Morgan State
- Conference: MEAC
- Record: 472–497

Biographical details
- Born: Kansas City, Missouri
- Education: Oak Park High School; University of Missouri; Morgan State University

Coaching career (HC unless noted)

Volleyball
- 1987–present: Morgan State

Softball
- 1995–2003: Morgan State

Accomplishments and honors

Championships
- 4 MEAC Women's Volleyball Regular Season (1992, 1997, 1998, 2000); 3 NCAA Division I women's volleyball tournament appearances (1997, 1998, 2000)

Awards
- 5× MEAC Women's Volleyball Coach of the Year; 4× MEAC women's volleyball tournament Most Outstanding Coach; Morgan State University Varsity M Club Hall of Fame (2003); Oak Park High School Hall of Fame (2006)

Ramona Riley-Bozier is an American college volleyball coach who has served as the head coach at Morgan State since 1987.

Riley-Bozier graduated from the Morgan State University, earning her bachelor's degree in history in 1987. She completed her master's degree in sociology from Morgan State in 1991.

== Head coaching record ==
=== Softball ===
The following table lists Riley-Bozier's head coaching record at the NCAA level.

Record table
| Season | Team | Overall | Conference | Standing | Postseason |
|---|---|---|---|---|---|
Morgan State Bears (Mid-Eastern Athletic Conference) (1995–2003)
| 1995 | Morgan State | 10-22 | 10-13 | | |
| 1996 | Morgan State | 15-17 | 14-8 | | |
| 1997 | Morgan State | 20-19 | 14-2 | | |
| 1998 | Morgan State | 25-9 | 16-0 | | |
| 1999 | Morgan State | 19-19 | 13-3 | | |
| 2000 | Morgan State | 21-23 | 10-6 | | |
| 2001 | Morgan State | 26-28 | | | |
| 2002 | Morgan State | 17-30 | | | |
| 2003 | Morgan State | 16-25 | | | |
| Morgan State: | | 161-194 | | | |
| Total: | | 161-194 | | | |
National champion Postseason invitational champion Conference regular season champion Conference regular season and conference tournament champion Division regular season champion Division regular season and conference tournament champion Conference tournament champion

=== Volleyball ===
Record table
| Season | Team | Overall | Conference | Standing | Postseason |
|---|---|---|---|---|---|
Morgan State Bears (Mid-Eastern Athletic Conference) (1988–present)
| 1988 | Morgan State | 0-0 | - | | |
| 1989 | Morgan State | 6-25 | - | | |
| 1990 | Morgan State | 8-17 | - | | |
| 1991 | Morgan State | 27-10 | - | | |
| 1992 | Morgan State | 22-10 | - | 1st | |
| 1993 | Morgan State | 13-19 | - | | |
| 1994 | Morgan State | 17-16 | - | | |
| 1995 | Morgan State | 24-13 | - | | |
| 1996 | Morgan State | 25-9 | - | | |
| 1997 | Morgan State | 25-10 | - | 1st | NCAA First Round |
| 1998 | Morgan State | 18-15 | - | 1st | NCAA First Round |
| 1999 | Morgan State | 21-9 | 10-0 | 1st | |
| 2000 | Morgan State | 26-16 | 10-0 | 1st | NCAA First Round |
| 2001 | Morgan State | 20-14 | - | | |
| 2002 | Morgan State | 20-15 | 9-1 | | |
| 2003 | Morgan State | 15-18 | 7-3 | | |
| 2004 | Morgan State | 20-19 | 9-2 | | |
| 2005 | Morgan State | 14-21 | 6-4 | | |
| 2006 | Morgan State | 23-9 | 8-1 | | |
| 2007 | Morgan State | 11-17 | 7-3 | | |
| 2008 | Morgan State | 3-25 | 2-8 | | |
| 2009 | Morgan State | 9-22 | 4-6 | | |
| 2010 | Morgan State | 6-20 | 4-6 | | |
| 2011 | Morgan State | 10-19 | 8-4 | | |
| 2012 | Morgan State | 5-21 | 4-8 | | |
| 2013 | Morgan State | 12-13 | 7-5 | | |
| 2014 | Morgan State | 13-13 | 6-6 | | |
| 2015 | Morgan State | 13-15 | 9-3 | | |
| 2016 | Morgan State | 7-21 | 7-5 | | |
| 2017 | Morgan State | 8-18 | 7-5 | | |
| 2018 | Morgan State | 13-15 | 5-5 | | |
| 2019 | Morgan State | 18-13 | 10-5 | | |
| Morgan State: | | 472-497 | | | |
| Total: | | 472-497 | | | |
National champion Postseason invitational champion Conference regular season champion Conference regular season and conference tournament champion Division regular season champion Division regular season and conference tournament champion Conference tournament champion
