= Ashley Aune =

American politician

Minority Leader of the Missouri House of Representatives
- Incumbent
- Assumed office January 8, 2025
- Preceded by: Crystal Quade

Member of the Missouri House of Representatives from the 14th district
- Incumbent
- Assumed office January 9, 2021
- Preceded by: Matt Sain

Personal details
- Party: Democratic
- Education: University of Kansas (BA)

Ashley Aune is an American business owner and politician. She currently serves as a member of the Missouri House of Representatives, representing the 14th district in the Northland of Kansas City, Missouri.

== Personal life ==
Her mother is Hispanic and Native American.

== Missouri House of Representatives ==
=== Committee assignments ===
Aune serves on the following committees: Rules - Legislative Oversight, Special Committee on Small Business, Downsizing State Government, and Emerging Issues. She is the Ranking Minority Member on the Emerging Issues Committee.

=== Electoral history ===
2020 Missouri House of Representatives 14th district Democratic Primary
Party	Candidate	Votes	%
Democratic	Ashley Aune	4,224	100.00%
Total votes		4,224	100.00%

2020 Missouri House of Representatives 14th district General Election
Party	Candidate	Votes	%
Democratic	Ashley Aune	12,584	53.39%
Republican	Eric Holmes	10,985	46.61%
Total votes		23,569	100.00%

Missouri House of Representatives Election, November 8, 2022, District 14
Party	Candidate	Votes	%	±%
Democratic	Ashley Aune	7,859	53.22%	−0.17
Republican	Eric Holmes	6,907	46.78%	+0.17
Total votes		14,766	100.00%	

Missouri House of Representatives
Preceded by Crystal Quade	Minority Leader of the Missouri House of Representatives; 2025–present	Incumbent
