= Matt Sain =

American politician

Member of the Missouri House of Representatives from the 14th district
- In office January 9, 2019 – January 9, 2021
- Preceded by: Kevin Corlew
- Succeeded by: Ashley Aune

Personal details
- Party: Democratic Party
- Education: Lindenwood University

Matt Sain was a member of the Missouri House of Representatives from 2019 to 2021. In 2018, he defeated incumbent Kevin Corlew by a margin of 85 votes. He is responsible for the St. Louis Blues being the official hockey team of Missouri. He was planning to run for re-election but eventually withdrew from the Democratic Primary.

== Missouri House of Representatives ==
=== Committee assignments ===
- Administration and Accounts Committee
- Crime Prevention and Public Safety Committee
- Pensions Committee
- Utilities Committee

=== Electoral history ===
2018 Missouri House of Representatives 14th district General Election
Party	Candidate	Votes	%
Democratic	Matt Sain	8,989	50.2
Republican	Kevin Corlew	8,904	49.8
Total votes		17,893	100.0
