= Ryan Silvey =

American politician

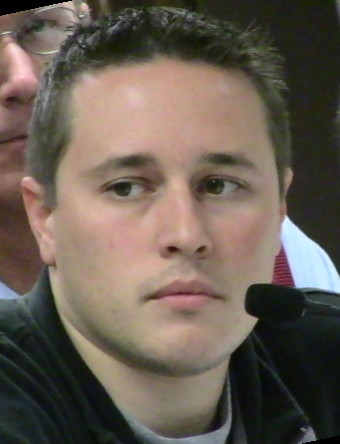

Member of the Missouri Senate from the 17th district
- In office 2013–2018
- Preceded by: LuAnn Ridgeway

Member of the Missouri House of Representatives from the 38th district
- In office 2005–2013
- Preceded by: Dan Bishop
- Succeeded by: T.J. Berry

Personal details
- Born: April 17, 1976 (age 50) Kansas City, Missouri, U.S.
- Party: Republican
- Children: 1
- Education: Bob Jones University
- Occupation: Politician

Ryan Silvey (born April 17, 1976) is a former Republican member of the Missouri Senate and currently serves on the Missouri Public Service Commission. He represented the 17th district in the Missouri Senate, which includes part of Clay County, from 2013 until his resignation January 4, 2018.

== Early life and career ==
Ryan Silvey was born in Kansas City, Missouri, where he attended Oak Park High School. He later attended Bob Jones University and majored in interpretive speech. He is a member of the Northland Regional Chamber of Commerce. He has a daughter.

== Political career ==
Silvey was a legislative aide to US Senator Kit Bond. He represented the 38th district in the Missouri House of Representatives from 2005 to 2013. He was elected in a special election in 2005 and then reelected in 2006, 2008, and 2010. In 2011, he was made the chairman of the powerful budget committee.

In 2011, Silvey decided to run for the 17th district in the Missouri Senate. It was an open seat because LuAnn Ridgeway was unable to run for re-election due to term limits. Silvey received endorsements from LuAnn Ridgeway, Rob Schaaf, five other current and former Republican representatives, and two Clay County officials. He won the election with 52.8% over Democrat Sandra Reeves.

Silvey resigned from the Missouri Senate on January 4, 2018, and was unanimously confirmed by the Missouri Senate to a position on the Missouri Public Service Commission.

The American Conservative Union gave him an 89% evaluation in 2013 and a 71% evaluation in 2017.

== Electoral history ==
2012 General Election for Missouri’s 17th Senate District
Party	Candidate	Votes	%	±%
Republican	Ryan Silvey	42,491	52.8%	
Democratic	Sandra Reeves	37,997	47.2%	

2010 General Election for Missouri’s 38th District House of Representatives
Party	Candidate	Votes	%	±%
Republican	Ryan Silvey	9,133	69.7	
Democratic	Debbie Colozza	3,979	30.3	

2008 General Election for Missouri’s 38th District House of Representatives
Party	Candidate	Votes	%	±%
Republican	Ryan Silvey	12,083	58.5	
Democratic	Josh Reed	8,574	41.5	

2006 General Election for Missouri’s 38th District House of Representatives
Party	Candidate	Votes	%	±%
Republican	Ryan Silvey	7,480	55.7	
Democratic	Dennis Spears	5,960	44.3	

2005 Special Election for Missouri’s 38th District House of Representatives
Party	Candidate	Votes	%	±%
Republican	Ryan Silvey	3,468	51.6	
Democratic	Teresa Loar	3,255	48.4	
