= Jon Carpenter =

American politician

Western Commissioner of Clay County
- Incumbent
- Assumed office 2022

Member of the Missouri House of Representatives from the 15th district
- In office 2013–2021
- Succeeded by: Maggie Nurrenbern

Personal details
- Party: Democratic
- Education: University of Southern California

Jon Carpenter is an American politician who represented Missouri's 15th district in Kansas City's Northland and was elected in 2012 to the Missouri House of Representatives. Carpenter owns a marketing and advertising firm. He is also a member of the Gladstone Area Chamber of Commerce and the Northland Democratic Club.

In 2020, he ran for the Clay County Commission Western and won by a narrow margin.

== Early life ==
Carpenter attended St. Charles grade school, and St. Charles Borromeo Catholic Church in Kansas City, Missouri. At North Kansas City High School, his hard work and determination earned him a spot as a National Merit Scholar and he received a scholarship to the University of Southern California.

While at school in Los Angeles, Carpenter interned for four-term U.S. Senator Dianne Feinstein. He served as Financial Director and later President of the USC College Democrats. He graduated magna cum laude with a degree in Political Science and a minor in International Relations.

After graduation, he returned to the state and married his wife Midori. Together, they started Carpenter Communications, a marketing and advertising firm that partners with local businesses and nonprofit organizations.

== Electoral career ==
In 2012, Carpenter defeated Carol Suter and Shon Adamson in the Democratic primary to win the Democratic nomination. Carpenter then went on to defeat Republican Kevin Corlew by 9,294 votes to 7,251 votes.

In 2016, Carpenter was reelected after running unopposed in both the Democratic primary and the general election.

In 2018, Carpenter ran unopposed in the Democratic primary and went on to defeat the controversial and notoriously antisemitic Republican candidate Steve West by receiving 9261 votes to West's 5398 votes.

Currently, Carpenter is the Western Commissioner for Clay County. He was on the ballot in the Democratic primary on August 4, 2020. According to the Kansas City Star, "[Carpenter] wants to get the county leadership refocused on its fundamental responsibilities: infrastructure and funding for public safety and social services."

== Legislative career ==
As a state legislator, Carpenter served on the Missouri House of Representatives' Administrative Oversight Committee, the General Laws Committee, and the Special Committee on Government Oversight, and served as the Ranking Minority Member on the Professional Registration and Licensing Committee in 2020.
