= Oakwood School =

Oakwood School may refer to:

== U.S. ==
- Oakwood School (Los Angeles), K-12, San Fernando Valley region of Los Angeles
- Oakwood School, Morgan Hill, preschool through college prep in Silicon Valley
- Oakwood Friends School, Poughkeepsie, New York
- Oakwood High School (Ohio), Montgomery County, Ohio

== U.K. ==
- Oakwood High School, Rotherham, Rotherham, South Yorkshire, England
- Oakwood School, Horley, Surrey, England
- Oak Wood School, Hillingdon, Greater London, England

== Australia ==
- Oakwood School, Tasmania
- Oakwood State School in Oakwood, Queensland

== See also ==
- Oakwood (disambiguation)
- Oakwood Academy (disambiguation)
