= North Kansas City High School =

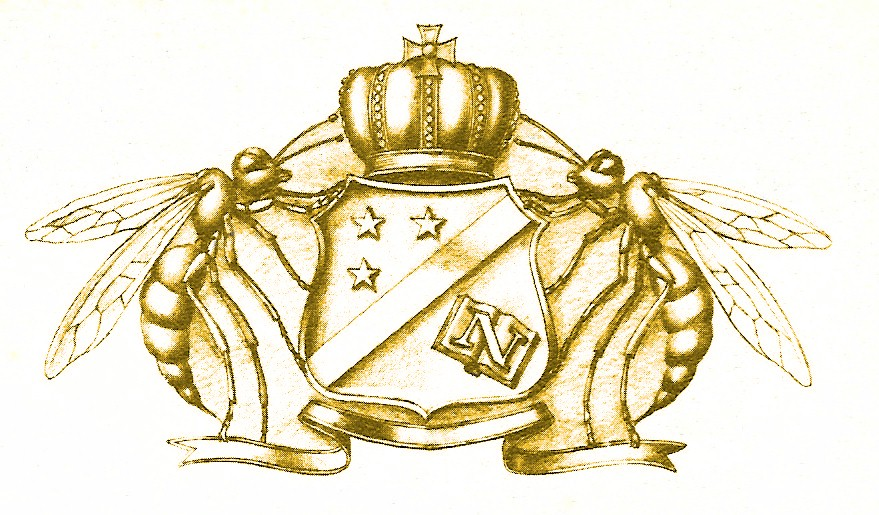

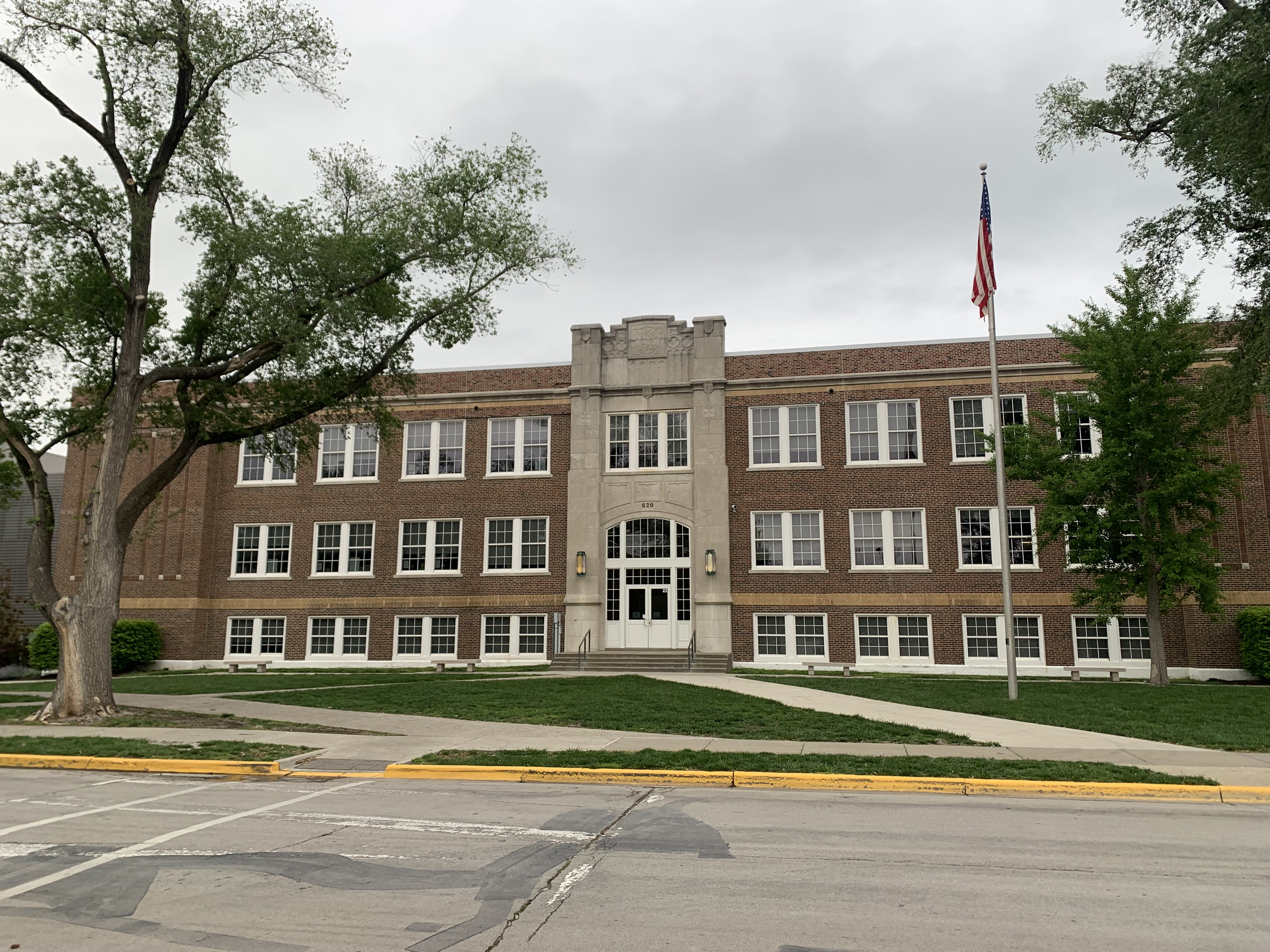

Location
- 620 East 23rd Avenue; North Kansas City, Missouri 64116; United States; 39°08′45″N 94°34′23″W

Information
- Type: Public
- Motto: NorthtownTRUE
- School district: North Kansas City School District
- Principal: Christopher Green
- Teaching staff: 103.53 (on an FTE basis)
- Grades: 9–12
- Enrollment: 1,690 (2023–2024)
- Student to teacher ratio: 16.32
- Colors: Purple and gold
- Mascot: Hornet
- Rivals: Staley High School, Oak Park High School, Winnetonka High School, Park Hill South High School
- Newspaper: The Buzz
- Yearbook: 1924–1949 The Owl; 1950–present The Purgold
- Broadcast: NTV News
- Website: North Kansas City High School

North Kansas City High School (also known as NKCHS, NKC, and Northtown) is a high school in North Kansas City, Missouri, United States, with over 1,900 students enrolled. It is a part of the North Kansas City School District.

The first graduating class found of record was in 1917 with three known graduates. The school began as an all-white school, due to the inhabitants of the community, and is now one of the most diverse and integrated schools in the nation.

Since July 2001, Northtown has been an International Baccalaureate World School with Dr. Jane Reed as the program coordinator.

Its boundary includes North Kansas City, Avondale, and portions of Gladstone south of NW Englewood Road.

== History ==
Throughout the school's history, several buildings have been built and torn down. Currently, the only remaining building of the original multi-building campus is the three-story Main building. Northtown began significant renovations beginning the fall of 2016. As of the 2020–2021 school year, the renovations are complete with the addition of A, B, and C wings. A Building, containing a new performing arts center and orchestra, band, choir, woodshop, and theatre classrooms, was finished in August 2020. B Building, containing numerous new classrooms and study rooms, was finished before the onset of the 2018–2019 school year. C Building, containing a new cafeteria, main gymnasium, auxiliary gymnasium, weight room, and locker rooms, was completed for the 2018–2019 school year. Additionally, the old Main building underwent massive renovations to fix safety concerns and put in a new multimedia center and more classrooms. Northtown was one of the only local schools to have an open campus. However, this changed with the completion of the schools' renovation; the campus is now a closed campus. Students and alumni may recall buildings such as the "Academy" or "South Campus" and the Norclay building (on the other side of Howell street). Both were closed at the beginning of the 2020–2021 school year as well, and the "Academy" or "South Campus" (south of the Main building) was torn down and replaced by a parking lot.

The stone wall around the NKCHS football field was created as a works project during the Great Depression. It has been ranked the Most Interesting High School Football Field in the Kansas City area by the Kansas City Star, and has been used for local commercials, including Metro Sports.

The current main building was contracted to be built the first of March 1925 as documented in the 1925 NKCHS Owl Yearbook for a total cost of $190,000. The contract was awarded to Fritzlen & Hufford Construction in Liberty, Missouri. The 1926 NKCHS Owl yearbook describes the opening and dedication of the new building on Sunday afternoon, January 24, 1926, by Missouri Governor Baker.

One of the buildings where classes were held was the Hiram McElroy Dagg building.

== Mascot ==
The school's mascot is the hornet. Although many have thought the original mascot was an owl, no evidence of that exists in NKCHS yearbooks. There is, however, evidence of the hornet mascot in the 1929 yearbook. The confusion comes with the name of the yearbook from 1924 through 1949; which was The Owl. High school jewelry like pins also bore the image of an owl; however, there is no evidence that the owl was the school's mascot. In the 1929 Owl yearbook, the Pep Squad states, "All right, let's everybody give fifteen big "Rahs" for the "Hornets". In the 1930 NKCHS Owl yearbook, the hornet is shown on basketball players' shirts.

== Yearbook ==
The Owl yearbook was printed from 1924 through 1949. No yearbook was printed in 1933, 1932 or 1927 for reasons unknown. The school adopted a new name for the yearbook in 1950: the Purgold.

== Athletics ==
In the 2019 season, the women's basketball team defeated Jefferson City High School in the state championship game. Head Coach Jeff Lacy was also named Coach of the Year.

Competitive teams include:

Men's and women's teams
- Soccer
- Swimming and diving
- Tennis
- Golf
- Track and field
- Cross country
- Basketball
- Wrestling
- Dance
- Step
- Majorette
- Volleyball
- Cheerleading
Men's only
- Baseball
- Football
Women's only
- Softball
- Flag-Football

== Musical groups ==
Choral
- Chamber Choir
- Harmonaires Show Choir
- Men's Choir
- Treble Choir
Orchestral
- Concert (Freshman) Orchestra
- Symphonic Orchestra
- Chamber Orchestra
- Jazz Orchestra
- Cello Choir
Band
- Color Guard
- Concert Band
- Jazz Band
- Marching Band
- Symphonic Band

== Organizations and clubs ==
=== Publications ===
- Newspaper (The Buzz)/N2 Sports Broadcasting
- Yearbook (Purgold)
- Broadcast (NTV NEWS)

=== Activities ===
- Cheerleading
- Pom Pon/NKC Stingers
- Student Council
- TSA
- Winter Guard
- Speech & Debate

=== Clubs ===
- Afro-Caribbean Dance Group
- Anime Club
- Asian Student Union
- Black Student Union
- Celebrating Faith Club
- Chess Club
- Distributive Education Clubs of America
- Disability Awareness Club
- Diversity Council
- Dungeons & Dragons Club
- Environmental/Recycling Club
- Fashion Club
- Future Business Leaders of America
- Fellowship of Christian Athletes
- Family, Career and Community Leaders of America
- FIRST Robotics (Team 5098 – STING – R)
- Film Club
- French Club
- Growing Northtown Garden Club
- Genders & Sexualities Alliance
- Guitar Club
- Hope Squad
- HOSA; Future Health Leaders National Honor Society
- Model UN
- Muslim Student Association
- National Honor Society
- NKC Book Club
- NKC Hockey Club
- NKC Powerlifting
- Northtown Disc Golf Club
- Northtown eSports
- Northtown Theatre Association/International Thespian Society Troupe 2191
- Paper RPG Club
- Quill & Scroll
- Scholar Bowl
- Science Olympiad
- Sports Talk Club
- Student Council
- Student Advocates for Speech
- Teach Club
- Technology Student Association
- The Writer's Society
- Women’s Empowerment
- Young Americans for Freedom
- Young Progressives
- Video Game Development
- Men's Mental Health Club

== Notable alumni ==
- Adetomiwa Adebawore (class of 2019), defensive tackle for the Indianapolis Colts
- Lauren Arthur (class of 2006), Missouri Labor and Industrial Relations Commissioner, former Missouri state senator and representative
- Robin Wayne Bailey (class of 1970), author
- Al Conway (class of 1948), All-American running back (1952), NFL umpire, North Kansas City High School football coach
- Jon Carpenter (class of 2006), Western Commissioner for Clay County, Missouri state representative
- Connie Dover (class of 1976), singer, Emmy Award-winning producer and composer
- Alan Huss (class of 1997), head basketball coach at High Point University
- Bill Kelso (class of 1958), Major League Baseball player and scout, owner of Kelso's Pizza restaurants
- Domonique Orange (class of 2022), college football defensive tackle for the Iowa State Cyclones
- Mark Patton (class of 1976), actor, Nightmare on Elm Street, General Hospital
- Rodolfo "Rudy" Reyes (class of 1990), actor and author
- Rick Scott (class of 1970), United States Senator from Florida, 45th Governor of Florida
- Katheryn Shields (class of 1964), Jackson County executive, Missouri Democratic politician
- Trent Skaggs (class of 1991), Missouri state representative
- Garrett Stutz, (class of 2008), professional basketball player
