= Avondale, Missouri =

City in Clay County, Missouri, United States

- City
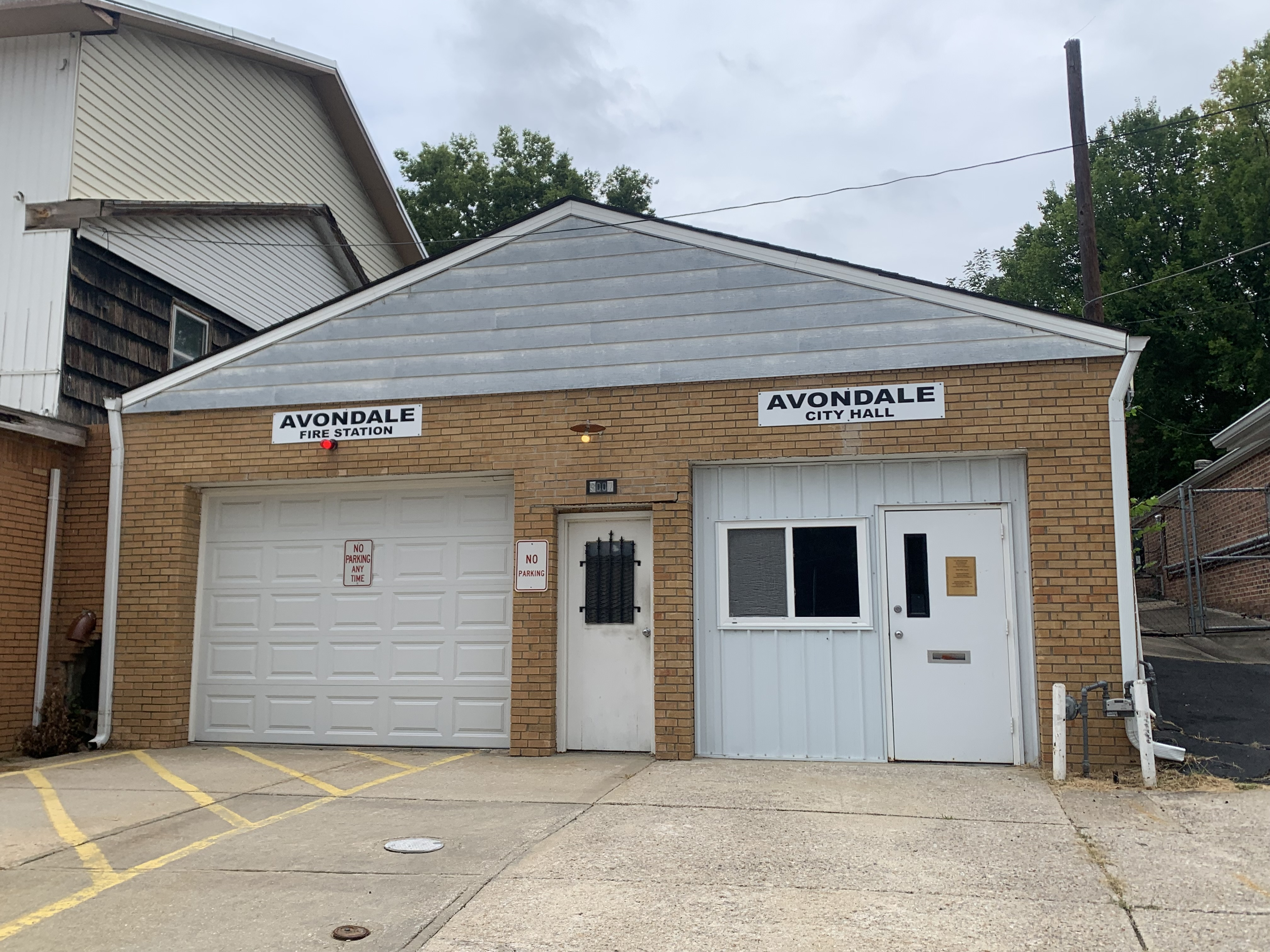
- Avondale city hall and fire station, September 2025

- Location of Avondale, Missouri
- Coordinates: 39°09′16″N 94°32′43″W
- Country: United States
- State: Missouri
- County: Clay

Area
  - Total: 0.14 sq mi (0.35 km^{2})
  - Land: 0.14 sq mi (0.35 km^{2})
  - Water: 0 sq mi (0.00 km^{2})
- Elevation: 810 ft (250 m)

Population (2020)
  - Total: 436
  - Density: 3,225.0/sq mi (1,245.18/km^{2})
- Time zone: UTC-6 (Central (CST))
  - Summer (DST): UTC-5 (CDT)
- ZIP code: 64117
- Area codes: 816, 975
- FIPS code: 29-02800
- GNIS feature ID: 2394044
- Website: avondalemo.com

Avondale is a city in Clay County, Missouri, United States. The population was 436 at the 2020 census. It is part of the Kansas City metropolitan area.

== History ==
A post office called Avondale was established in 1915. The city was named after the River Avon, in England. Avondale is the birthplace of World War Two hero Carl Beck. Carl served in the 101st Airborne at Normandy and at Bastogne.

== Geography ==
According to the United States Census Bureau, the city has a total area of 0.14 square miles (0.36 km^{2}), all land.

The city of Avondale is bordered by Kansas City on the north and the city of North Kansas City on the south. The neighborhoods of River Forest and Cooley Highlands comprise its northwest and northeast border with Kansas City, respectively.

== Demographics ==
Historical population
Census	Pop.	Note	%±
1920	314		—
1930	452		43.9%
1940	435		−3.8%
1950	532		22.3%
1960	663		24.6%
1970	512		−22.8%
1980	612		19.5%
1990	550		−10.1%
2000	529		−3.8%
2010	440		−16.8%
2020	436		−0.9%
U.S. Decennial Census

=== Racial and ethnic composition ===
Avondale city, Missouri – Racial and ethnic composition Note: the US Census treats Hispanic/Latino as an ethnic category. This table excludes Latinos from the racial categories and assigns them to a separate category. Hispanics/Latinos may be of any race.
Race / Ethnicity (NH = Non-Hispanic)	Pop 2000	Pop 2010	Pop 2020	% 2000	% 2010	% 2020
White alone (NH)	497	378	338	93.95%	85.91%	77.52%
Black or African American alone (NH)	5	18	27	0.95%	4.09%	6.19%
Native American or Alaska Native alone (NH)	4	5	0	0.76%	1.14%	0.00%
Asian alone (NH)	2	2	16	0.38%	0.45%	3.67%
Native Hawaiian or Pacific Islander alone (NH)	0	1	1	0.00%	0.23%	0.23%
Other race alone (NH)	2	0	0	0.38%	0.00%	0.00%
Mixed race or Multiracial (NH)	7	5	19	1.32%	1.14%	4.36%
Hispanic or Latino (any race)	12	31	35	2.27%	7.05%	8.03%
Total	529	440	436	100.00%	100.00%	100.00%

=== 2010 census ===
As of the census of 2010, there were 440 people, 199 households, and 109 families living in the city. The population density was 3,142.9 inhabitants per square mile (1,213.5/km^{2}). There were 226 housing units at an average density of 1,614.3 per square mile (623.3/km^{2}). The racial makeup of the city was 89.1% White, 4.1% African American, 1.1% Native American, 0.5% Asian, 0.2% Pacific Islander, 1.4% from other races, and 3.6% from two or more races. Hispanic or Latino of any race were 7.0% of the population.

There were 199 households, of which 22.1% had children under the age of 18 living with them, 37.7% were married couples living together, 11.6% had a female householder with no husband present, 5.5% had a male householder with no wife present, and 45.2% were non-families. 30.2% of all households were made up of individuals, and 9% had someone living alone who was 65 years of age or older. The average household size was 2.21 and the average family size was 2.78.

The median age in the city was 43.4 years. 18% of residents were under the age of 18; 6.1% were between the ages of 18 and 24; 27.5% were from 25 to 44; 33.6% were from 45 to 64; and 14.8% were 65 years of age or older. The gender makeup of the city was 53.0% male and 47.0% female.

=== 2000 census ===
As of the census of 2000, there were 529 people, 219 households, and 146 families living in the city. The population density was 3,996.3 inhabitants per square mile (1,543.0/km^{2}). There were 224 housing units at an average density of 1,692.2 per square mile (653.4/km^{2}). The racial makeup of the city was 94.52% White, 0.95% African American, 0.76% Native American, 0.38% Asian, 2.08% from other races, and 1.32% from two or more races. Hispanic or Latino of any race were 2.27% of the population.

There were 219 households, out of which 26.9% had children under the age of 18 living with them, 49.8% were married couples living together, 9.6% had a female householder with no husband present, and 33.3% were non-families. 22.8% of all households were made up of individuals, and 5.5% had someone living alone who was 65 years of age or older. The average household size was 2.42 and the average family size was 2.84.

In the city, the population was spread out, with 20.2% under the age of 18, 10.0% from 18 to 24, 34.6% from 25 to 44, 21.9% from 45 to 64, and 13.2% who were 65 years of age or older. The median age was 37 years. For every 100 females, there were 100.4 males. For every 100 females age 18 and over, there were 107.9 males.

The median income for a household in the city was $37,159, and the median income for a family was $38,958. Males had a median income of $33,750 versus $25,833 for females. The per capita income for the city was $17,372. About 9.6% of families and 10.1% of the population were below the poverty line, including 6.3% of those under age 18 and 2.8% of those age 65 or over.

== Education ==
North Kansas City School District is the area school district. Avondale is zoned to Chouteau Elementary School, Northgate Middle School, and North Kansas City High School.

Metropolitan Community College has the North Kansas City school district in its taxation area.

== See also ==
- List of cities in Missouri
