= Atkins-Johnson Farmhouse Property =

Historic house in Missouri, United States

- U.S. National Register of Historic Places
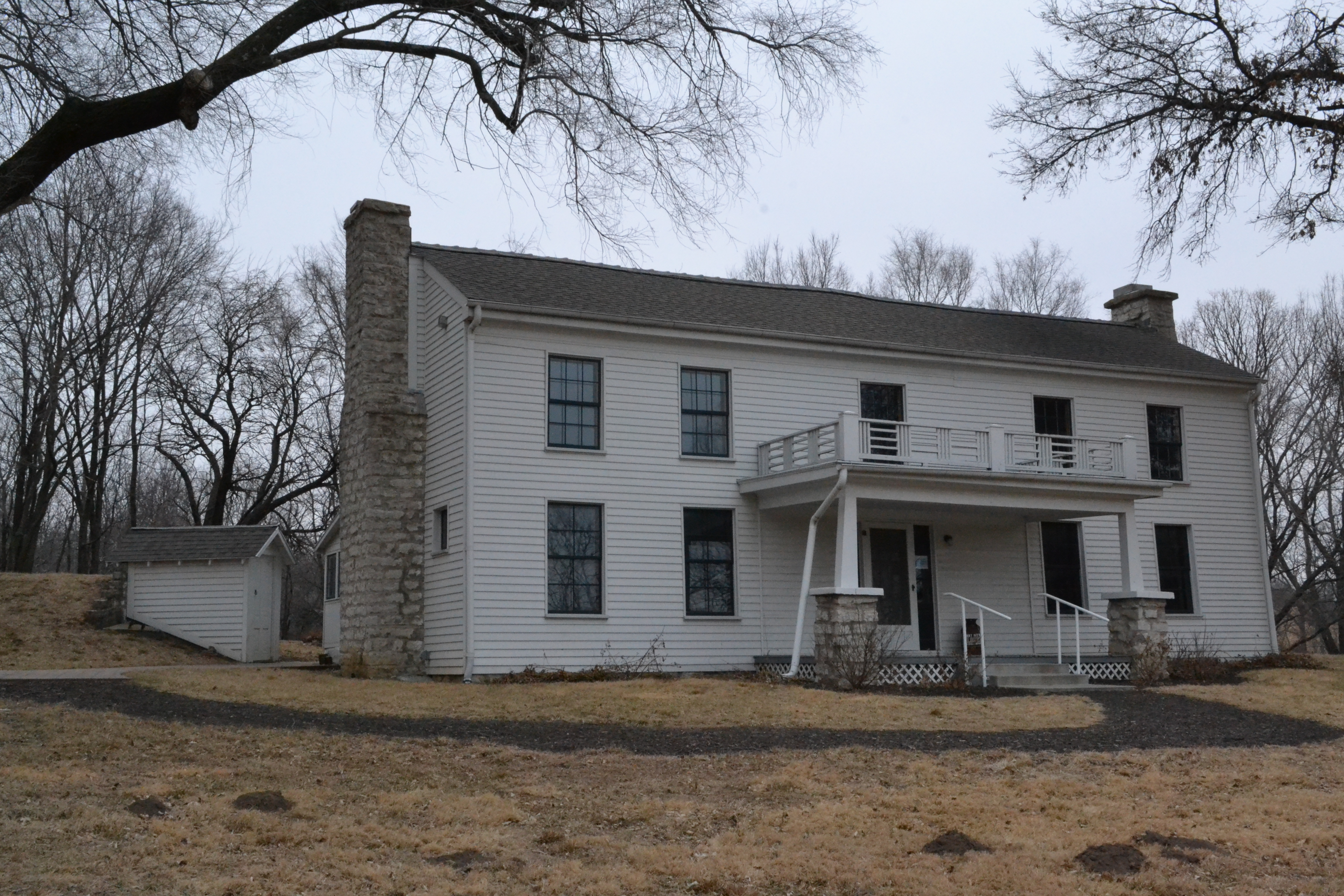

- Location within Missouri Location within the United States
- Location: 6508 N Jackson Ave., Gladstone, Missouri
- Coordinates: 39°12′46″N 94°31′49″W
- Area: 2 acres (0.81 ha)
- Built: c. 1853
- Built by: Atkins, Jonathon Q.
- Architectural style: I-house
- NRHP reference No.: 07001154
- Added to NRHP: November 7, 2007

Atkins-Johnson Farmhouse Property, also known as the Alkins Farm, is a historic home and farm complex located at Gladstone, Clay County, Missouri. The original log section of the farmhouse was built about 1826; it was enlarged to the present I-house about 1853. Also on the property are the contributing root cellar and entrance structure, a milk house, a well and pump structure, and a vehicular and equipment garage.

It was listed on the National Register of Historic Places in 2007.
