= Birmingham, Missouri =

- Village
- Location of Birmingham, Missouri
- Coordinates: 39°10′03″N 94°27′00″W
- Country: United States
- State: Missouri
- County: Clay

Area
  - Total: 0.56 sq mi (1.46 km^{2})
  - Land: 0.56 sq mi (1.46 km^{2})
  - Water: 0 sq mi (0.00 km^{2})
- Elevation: 735 ft (224 m)

Population (2020)
  - Total: 189
  - Density: 336.3/sq mi (129.86/km^{2})
- Time zone: UTC-6 (Central (CST))
  - Summer (DST): UTC-5 (CDT)
- ZIP code: 64161
- Area code: 816
- FIPS code: 29-05824
- GNIS feature ID: 2398126
- Website: villageofbirminghammo.com

Birmingham is a village in Clay County, Missouri, United States. The population was 189 at the 2020 census. It is part of the Kansas City metropolitan area.

== History ==
Birmingham was founded in 1887. The village was named after Birmingham, England. A post office was established at Birmingham in 1888, and remained in operation until 1956.

== Geography ==
According to the United States Census Bureau, the village has a total area of 0.56 square miles (1.45 km^{2}), all land. Birmingham is entirely surrounded by Kansas City, with the Minneville neighborhood to the north and west and the Birmingham Bottoms neighborhood to the south and east.

== Demographics ==
Historical population
Census	Pop.	Note	%±
1890	401		—
1900	217		−45.9%
1910	136		−37.3%
1920	175		28.7%
1930	273		56.0%
1940	160		−41.4%
1950	236		47.5%
1960	201		−14.8%
1970	266		32.3%
1980	240		−9.8%
1990	222		−7.5%
2000	214		−3.6%
2010	183		−14.5%
2020	189		3.3%
U.S. Decennial Census

=== Racial and ethnic composition ===
Birmingham village, Missouri – Racial and ethnic composition Note: the US Census treats Hispanic/Latino as an ethnic category. This table excludes Latinos from the racial categories and assigns them to a separate category. Hispanics/Latinos may be of any race.
Race / Ethnicity (NH = Non-Hispanic)	Pop 2000	Pop 2010	Pop 2020	% 2000	% 2010	% 2020
White alone (NH)	209	170	169	97.66%	92.90%	89.42%
Black or African American alone (NH)	2	1	0	0.93%	0.55%	0.00%
Native American or Alaska Native alone (NH)	0	7	0	0.00%	3.83%	0.00%
Asian alone (NH)	0	0	3	0.00%	0.00%	1.59%
Native Hawaiian or Pacific Islander alone (NH)	0	0	0	0.00%	0.00%	0.00%
Other race alone (NH)	0	0	1	0.00%	0.00%	0.53%
Mixed race or Multiracial (NH)	3	0	9	1.40%	0.00%	4.76%
Hispanic or Latino (any race)	0	5	7	0.00%	2.73%	3.70%
Total	214	183	189	100.00%	100.00%	100.00%

=== 2010 census ===
As of the census of 2010, there were 183 people, 75 households, and 52 families living in the village. The population density was 326.8 inhabitants per square mile (126.2/km^{2}). There were 85 housing units at an average density of 151.8 per square mile (58.6/km^{2}). The racial makeup of the village was 94.5% White, 0.5% African American, 3.8% Native American, and 1.1% from other races. Hispanic or Latino of any race were 2.7% of the population.

There were 75 households, of which 29.3% had children under the age of 18 living with them, 46.7% were married couples living together, 13.3% had a female householder with no husband present, 9.3% had a male householder with no wife present, and 30.7% were non-families. 24.0% of all households were made up of individuals, and 8% had someone living alone who was 65 years of age or older. The average household size was 2.44 and the average family size was 2.87.

The median age in the village was 36.8 years. 22.4% of residents were under the age of 18; 11.5% were between the ages of 18 and 24; 24.6% were from 25 to 44; 31.8% were from 45 to 64; and 9.8% were 65 years of age or older. The gender makeup of the village was 54.6% male and 45.4% female.

=== 2000 census ===
As of the census of 2000, there were 214 people, 82 households, and 56 families living in the village. The population density was 419.5 inhabitants per square mile (162.0/km^{2}). There were 89 housing units at an average density of 174.4 per square mile (67.3/km^{2}). The racial makeup of the village was 97.66% White, 0.93% African American, and 1.40% from two or more races.

There were 82 households, out of which 42.7% had children under the age of 18 living with them, 52.4% were married couples living together, 8.5% had a female householder with no husband present, and 31.7% were non-families. 24.4% of all households were made up of individuals, and 7.3% had someone living alone who was 65 years of age or older. The average household size was 2.61 and the average family size was 3.20.

In the village, the population was spread out, with 31.3% under the age of 18, 9.8% from 18 to 24, 26.6% from 25 to 44, 24.8% from 45 to 64, and 7.5% who were 65 years of age or older. The median age was 33 years. For every 100 females, there were 132.6 males. For every 100 females age 18 and over, there were 107.0 males.

The median income for a household in the village was $36,563, and the median income for a family was $45,000. Males had a median income of $38,125 versus $22,857 for females. The per capita income for the village was $16,420. About 8.1% of families and 5.1% of the population were below the poverty line, including 2.6% of those under the age of eighteen and 22.2% of those 65 or over.

== Education ==
North Kansas City School District is the area school district. It is zoned to Topping Elementary School, Maple Park Middle School, and Winnetonka High School.

Metropolitan Community College has the North Kansas City school district in its taxation area.
