= North Kansas City School District =

School district in Missouri, U.S.

Address
- 2000 Northeast 46th Street Kansas City, Missouri, 64116; United States

District information
- Type: Public
- Grades: PreK–12
- NCES District ID: 2922800

Students and staff
- Students: 19,673
- Teachers: 1,461.73
- Staff: 1,551.47
- Student–teacher ratio: 13.46

Other information
- Website: www.nkcschools.org

North Kansas City School District 74 or NKC Schools is a school district headquartered in Kansas City, Missouri.

As of 2019 it has over 20,000 students, and has about 82 square miles (210 km^{2}) of area.

The Harlem School District 72 and Glenwood School District 73 merged into the NKC Schools district on March 4, 1913. Its first school, Kenneth School, opened in summer 1913.

== Attendance boundary ==
Located mostly in Clay County, the district serves sections of Kansas City. It also serves all of the following: North Kansas City, Avondale, Birmingham, Claycomo, Gladstone, Oaks, Oakview, Oakwood, Oakwood Park, Pleasant Valley, and Randolph. Small portions of Independence and Liberty are in the district boundaries. Small portions of the district are in Platte County, and these portions include sections of Kansas City.

== Schools ==
High schools:

- North Kansas City High School
- Oak Park High School
- Staley High School
- Winnetonka High School

Middle schools:

- Antioch Middle School
- Maple Park Middle School
- New Mark Middle School
- Northgate Middle School

6th Grade:

- Eastgate 6th Grade Center
- Gateway 6th Grade Center

Elementary schools:

- Bell Prairie Elementary School
- Briarcliff Elementary School
- Chapel Hill Elementary School
- Choteau Elementary School
- Clardy Elementary School
- Crestview Elementary School
- Davidson Elementary School
- Fox Hill Elementary School
- Gashland Elementary School
- Gracemor Elementary School
- Greenway Elementary School
- Linden West Elementary School
- Maplewood Elementary School
- Meadowbrook Elementary School
- Nashua Elementary School
- Northview Elementary School
- Oakwood Manor Elementary School
- Ravenwood Elementary School
- Rising Hill Elementary School
- Topping Elementary School
- West Englewood Elementary School

Preschool:

- Early Childhood Special Education Center (ESCE)

Alternative:

- Students in Academically Gifted Education (SAGE) Center
- Golden Oaks Education Center
- Joseph G. Jacobs III Education Center

== Mascots ==
- North Kansas City High School Hornets
- Oak Park High School Northmen
- Staley High School Falcons
- Winnetonka High School Griffins
- Antioch Middle School Spartans
- Maple Park Middle School Vikings
- New Mark Middle School Northstars
- Northgate Middle School Gators
- Eastgate 6th Grade Center Eagles
- Gateway 6th Grade Center Grizzlies
- Bell Prairie Elementary School Mustangs
- Briarcliff Elementary School Bears
- Chapel Hill Elementary School Bobcats
- Choteau Elementary School Dragons
- Clardy Elementary School Wildcats
- Crestview Elementary School Cheetahs
- Davidson Elementary School Comets
- Fox Hill Elementary School Foxes
- Gashland Elementary School Stars
- Gracemor Elementary School Crusaders
- Greenway Elementary School Otters
- Linden West Elementary School Cougars
- Maplewood Elementary School Cougars
- Meadowbrook Elementary School Roadrunners
- Nashua Elementary School Stars
- Northview Elementary School Panthers
- Oakwood Manor Elementary School Owls
- Ravenwood Elementary School Ravens
- Rising Hill Elementary School Explorers
- Topping Elementary School Bulldogs
- West Englewood Elementary School Eagles
- Students in Academically Gifted Education (SAGE) Center Illuminators
- Golden Oaks Education Center Bulldogs
- Joseph G. Jacobs III Education Center Bulldogs
