= Kevin Corlew =

American politician

Member of the Missouri House of Representatives from the 14th district
- In office January 7, 2015 – December 5, 2018
- Preceded by: Ron Schieber
- Succeeded by: Matt Sain

Personal details
- Born: August 19, 1971 (age 54)
- Party: Republican

Kevin Corlew (born August 19, 1971) is an American politician who served in the Missouri House of Representatives, representing the 14th district from 2015 to 2018.

== Electoral history ==
=== State representative ===
Missouri House of Representatives Primary Election, August 5, 2014, District 14
Party	Candidate	Votes	%	±%
Republican	Kevin Corlew	2,142	72.86%	
Republican	Josh Catton	798	27.14%	

Missouri House of Representatives Election, November 4, 2014, District 14
Party	Candidate	Votes	%	±%
Republican	Kevin Corlew	4,904	56.10%	+1.36
Democratic	Stephanie Isaacson	3,837	43.90%	−1.36

Missouri House of Representatives Primary Election, August 2, 2016, District 14
Party	Candidate	Votes	%	±%
Republican	Kevin Corlew	1,929	61.24%	−11.62
Republican	Sean Pouche	1,221	38.76%	

Missouri House of Representatives Election, November 8, 2016, District 14
Party	Candidate	Votes	%	±%
Republican	Kevin Corlew	10,295	52.50%	−3.60
Democratic	Martin T. Rucker II	9,316	47.50%	+3.60

=== State Senate ===
Missouri Senate Special Election, June 5, 2018, District 17
Party	Candidate	Votes	%	±%
Republican	Kevin Corlew	9,923	40.34%	−20.92
Democratic	Lauren Arthur	14,675	59.66%	+20.92
