= Jay Swearingen =

American politician

Member of the Missouri House of Representatives from the 18th district
- In office 2011–2015
- Preceded by: Trent Skaggs
- Succeeded by: Lauren Arthur

Personal details
- Party: Democratic
- Education: Texas State University University of North Texas

Jay Swearingen is an American politician. He was member of the Missouri House of Representatives for the 18th district.
