= Oakwood Academy =

Oakwood Academy may refer to:

- The Oakwood Academy, a secondary school in Nottingham, Nottinghamshire, England
- Oakwood Adventist Academy, a Seventh-day Adventist school in Huntsville, Alabama, United States

== See also ==
- Oakwood (disambiguation)
- Oakwood School (disambiguation)
