= Trent Skaggs =

American businessman and politician

Member of the Missouri House of Representatives from the 18th district
- In office 2002–2011
- Succeeded by: Jay Swearingen

Personal details
- Party: Democratic
- Education: University of Missouri-Kansas City

Trent Skaggs (born June 7, 1973) is an American politician businessman who was a Democratic member of the Missouri House of Representatives. He resides in Kansas City, Missouri, with his wife, Amanda Corn, their two daughters, Ella and Cora, and their distinguished son, Levi.

He was born in North Kansas City, Missouri, and graduated from North Kansas City High School. He went on to obtain a B.A. in political science with a minor in economics from Northwest Missouri State University, going on to obtain a master's degree in public administration-healthcare from the University of Missouri-Kansas City. He is currently a partner in Rural Hospital Group (RHG), LLC.

He was first elected to the Missouri House of Representatives in 2002, winning re-election in 2004. He currently serves on the Local Government committee as well as the Utilities committee.

He is a deacon of the First Baptist Church of North Kansas City. He was a former member of the board of directors of Concerned Care, North Kansas City's Tax Increment Finance Committee, Business Council, Breakfast Club, Northland Chamber, Young Friends of the Northland (former co-chair), Democratic Central Committee, Metropolitan Community college (former chairman), and a current member of Community America Credit Union.

Currently, managing a small self-sustaining urban farm alongside his wife, and friends Bill and Gwen Van Asselt.
