= Randolph, Missouri =

City in Randolph County, Missouri, United States

- City
- Location of Randolph, Missouri
- Coordinates: 39°09′21″N 94°29′34″W
- Country: United States
- State: Missouri
- County: Clay

Area
  - Total: 0.34 sq mi (0.88 km^{2})
  - Land: 0.32 sq mi (0.84 km^{2})
  - Water: 0.019 sq mi (0.05 km^{2})
- Elevation: 758 ft (231 m)

Population (2020)
  - Total: 57
  - Density: 176.4/sq mi (68.12/km^{2})
- Time zone: UTC-6 (Central (CST))
  - Summer (DST): UTC-5 (CDT)
- ZIP codes: 64117, 64161
- Area code: 816
- FIPS code: 29-60590
- GNIS feature ID: 2399039

Randolph is a city in Clay County, Missouri, United States. The population was 57 at the 2020 census. It is completely surrounded by Kansas City and is a part of the Kansas City metropolitan area.

== History ==
An early variant name was "East Kansas City" and another was Randolph Heights. The name of the post office changed from East Kansas City to Randolph in 1920, and the post office closed in 1928.

== Geography ==
According to the United States Census Bureau, the city has a total area of 0.35 square miles (0.91 km^{2}), of which 0.33 square miles (0.85 km^{2}) is land and 0.02 square miles (0.05 km^{2}) is water. Randolph is on the banks of the Missouri River. It is surrounded by Kansas City on all land borders, and the opposite side of the Missouri is also Kansas City.

== Demographics ==
Historical population
Census	Pop.	Note	%±
1930	138		—
1940	188		36.2%
1950	206		9.6%
1960	219		6.3%
1970	106		−51.6%
1980	91		−14.2%
1990	60		−34.1%
2000	47		−21.7%
2010	52		10.6%
2020	57		9.6%
U.S. Decennial Census

=== Racial and ethnic composition ===
Randolph city, Missouri – Racial and ethnic composition Note: the US Census treats Hispanic/Latino as an ethnic category. This table excludes Latinos from the racial categories and assigns them to a separate category. Hispanics/Latinos may be of any race.
Race / Ethnicity (NH = Non-Hispanic)	Pop 2000	Pop 2010	Pop 2020	% 2000	% 2010	% 2020
White alone (NH)	45	50	51	95.74%	96.15%	89.47%
Black or African American alone (NH)	0	0	1	0.00%	0.00%	1.75%
Native American or Alaska Native alone (NH)	0	0	0	0.00%	0.00%	0.00%
Asian alone (NH)	0	1	0	0.00%	1.92%	0.00%
Native Hawaiian or Pacific Islander alone (NH)	0	0	0	0.00%	0.00%	0.00%
Other race alone (NH)	0	0	0	0.00%	0.00%	0.00%
Mixed race or Multiracial (NH)	2	0	2	4.26%	0.00%	3.51%
Hispanic or Latino (any race)	0	1	3	0.00%	1.92%	5.26%
Total	47	52	57	100.00%	100.00%	100.00%

=== 2010 census ===
As of the census of 2010, there were 52 people, 24 households, and 14 families living in the city. The population density was 157.6 inhabitants per square mile (60.8/km^{2}). There were 26 housing units at an average density of 78.8 per square mile (30.4/km^{2}). The racial makeup of the city was 98.1% White and 1.9% Asian. Hispanic or Latino of any race were 1.9% of the population.

There were 24 households, of which 20.8% had children under the age of 18 living with them, 41.7% were married couples living together, 12.5% had a female householder with no husband present, 4.2% had a male householder with no wife present, and 41.7% were non-families. 33.3% of all households were made up of individuals, and 8.4% had someone living alone who was 65 years of age or older. The average household size was 2.17 and the average family size was 2.71.

The median age in the city was 47.5 years. 17.3% of residents were under the age of 18; 7.7% were between the ages of 18 and 24; 19.2% were from 25 to 44; 34.5% were from 45 to 64; and 21.2% were 65 years of age or older. The gender makeup of the city was 59.6% male and 40.4% female.

=== 2000 census ===
As of the census of 2000, there were 47 people, 20 households, and 14 families living in the city. The population density was 137.7 inhabitants per square mile (53.2/km^{2}). There were 22 housing units at an average density of 64.5 per square mile (24.9/km^{2}). The racial makeup of the city was 95.74% White, and 4.26% from two or more races.

There were 20 households, out of which 15.0% had children under the age of 18 living with them, 55.0% were married couples living together, 15.0% had a female householder with no husband present, and 30.0% were non-families. 20.0% of all households were made up of individuals, and 5.0% had someone living alone who was 65 years of age or older. The average household size was 2.35 and the average family size was 2.64.

In the city the population was spread out, with 14.9% under the age of 18, 6.4% from 18 to 24, 38.3% from 25 to 44, 21.3% from 45 to 64, and 19.1% who were 65 years of age or older. The median age was 39 years. For every 100 females, there were 123.8 males. For every 100 females age 18 and over, there were 110.5 males.

The median income for a household in the city was $53,750, and the median income for a family was $53,750. Males had a median income of $31,667 versus $35,000 for females. The per capita income for the city was $23,067. None of the population and none of the families were below the poverty line.

== Education ==
Residents are zoned to North Kansas City School District. Randolph is zoned to Topping Elementary School, Maple Park Middle School, and Winnetonka High School.

Metropolitan Community College has the North Kansas City school district in its taxation area.

== Audit ==
In 2010, Randolph was cited by Missouri State Auditor Susan Montee for violating the state's speed trap law, by funding over 73% of the city budget from traffic violations.

== See also ==
- List of cities in Missouri
