= Maggie Nurrenbern =

American politician

Member of the Missouri House of Representatives from the 15th district
- In office January 9, 2021 – January 8, 2025
- Preceded by: Jon Carpenter
- Succeeded by: Kenneth Jamieson

Personal details
- Education: Truman State University

Maggie Nurrenbern is an American politician. She is a member of the Missouri Senate from the 17th district, serving since 2025. She previously represented the 15th district in the Missouri House of Representatives from 2021 to 2025. She is a member of the Democratic Party.

== Missouri House of Representatives ==
=== Committee assignments ===
- Budget
- Elementary and Secondary Education
- Subcommittee on Appropriations - General Administration

== Missouri Senate ==
In March 2025, Nurrenbern voted in favor of state takeover of the St. Louis Metropolitan Police Department.

== Electoral history ==
2020 Missouri House of Representatives 15th district General Election
Party	Candidate	Votes	%
Democratic	Maggie Nurrenbern	10,581	58.12%
Republican	Steve West	7,624	41.88%
Total votes		18,205	100.00%

Missouri House of Representatives Election, November 8, 2022, District 15
Party	Candidate	Votes	%	±%
Democratic	Maggie Nurrenbern	6,920	53.34%	−4.78
Republican	Adam Richardson	5,535	42.67%	+0.79
Independent	Steve West	518	3.99%	+3.99
Total votes		12,973	100.00%	
