= Oakwood Park, Missouri =

- Village
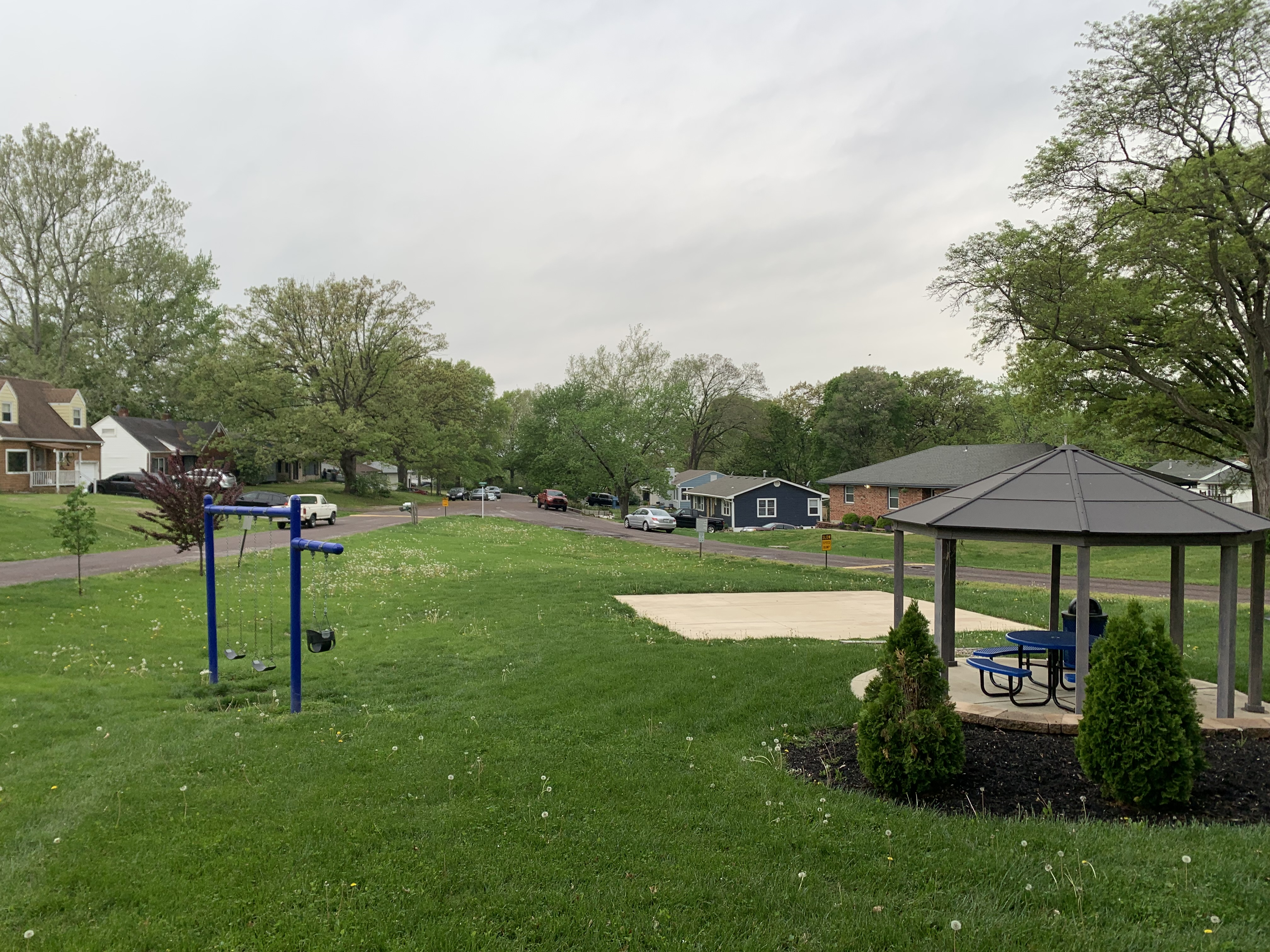
- Neighborhood in Oakwood Park

- Location of Oakwood Park, Missouri
- Coordinates: 39°12′17″N 94°34′26″W
- Country: United States
- State: Missouri
- County: Clay

Area
  - Total: 0.066 sq mi (0.17 km^{2})
  - Land: 0.066 sq mi (0.17 km^{2})
  - Water: 0 sq mi (0.00 km^{2})
- Elevation: 991 ft (302 m)

Population (2020)
  - Total: 189
  - Density: 2,816.1/sq mi (1,087.31/km^{2})
- Time zone: UTC-6 (Central (CST))
  - Summer (DST): UTC-5 (CDT)
- ZIP code: 64118
- Area codes: 816 and 975
- FIPS code: 29-53948
- GNIS feature ID: 2399550
- Website: villageofoakwoodpark.org

Oakwood Park is a village in Clay County, Missouri, United States. The population was 189 at the 2020 census. It is part of the Kansas City metropolitan area.

== Geography ==
According to the United States Census Bureau, the village has a total area of 0.07 square miles (0.18 km^{2}), all land.

Oakwood Park is bordered by Gladstone on its east and west sides, while the north and south sides are bounded by Oakview and Oakwood, respectively.

== Demographics ==
Historical population
Census	Pop.	Note	%±
1960	132		—
1970	266		101.5%
1980	231		−13.2%
1990	213		−7.8%
2000	183		−14.1%
2010	188		2.7%
2020	189		0.5%
U.S. Decennial Census

=== Racial and ethnic composition ===
Oakwood Park village, Missouri – Racial and ethnic composition Note: the US Census treats Hispanic/Latino as an ethnic category. This table excludes Latinos from the racial categories and assigns them to a separate category. Hispanics/Latinos may be of any race.
Race / Ethnicity (NH = Non-Hispanic)	Pop 2000	Pop 2010	Pop 2020	% 2000	% 2010	% 2020
White alone (NH)	178	166	152	97.27%	88.30%	80.42%
Black or African American alone (NH)	0	0	4	0.00%	0.00%	2.12%
Native American or Alaska Native alone (NH)	1	0	1	0.55%	0.00%	0.53%
Asian alone (NH)	0	3	2	0.00%	1.60%	1.06%
Native Hawaiian or Pacific Islander alone (NH)	0	3	1	0.00%	1.60%	0.53%
Other race alone (NH)	0	0	0	0.00%	0.00%	0.00%
Mixed race or Multiracial (NH)	0	6	12	0.00%	3.19%	6.35%
Hispanic or Latino (any race)	4	10	17	2.19%	5.32%	8.99%
Total	183	188	189	100.00%	100.00%	100.00%

=== 2010 census ===
As of the census of 2010, there were 188 people, 84 households, and 49 families living in the village. The population density was 2,685.7 inhabitants per square mile (1,037.0/km^{2}). There were 84 housing units at an average density of 1,200.0 units per square mile (463.3 units/km^{2}). The racial makeup of the village was 89.9% White, 1.6% Asian, 1.6% Pacific Islander, 3.2% from other races, and 3.7% from two or more races. Hispanic or Latino of any race were 5.3% of the population.

There were 84 households, of which 23.8% had children under the age of 18 living with them, 45.2% were married couples living together, 8.3% had a female householder with no husband present, 4.8% had a male householder with no wife present, and 41.7% were non-families. 34.5% of all households were made up of individuals, and 8.4% had someone living alone who was 65 years of age or older. The average household size was 2.24 and the average family size was 2.88.

The median age in the village was 42.5 years. 18.1% of residents were under the age of 18; 5.4% were between the ages of 18 and 24; 30.3% were from 25 to 44; 27.7% were from 45 to 64; and 18.6% were 65 years of age or older. The gender makeup of the village was 48.9% male and 51.1% female.

=== 2000 census ===
As of the census of 2000, there were 183 people, 82 households, and 54 families living in the village. The population density was 2,242.8 inhabitants per square mile (865.9/km^{2}). There were 86 housing units at an average density of 1,054.0 units per square mile (407.0 units/km^{2}). The racial makeup of the village was 99.45% White and 0.55% Native American. Hispanic or Latino of any race were 2.19% of the population.

There were 82 households, out of which 23.2% had children under the age of 18 living with them, 57.3% were married couples living together, 8.5% had a female householder with no husband present, and 34.1% were non-families. 32.9% of all households were made up of individuals, and 12.2% had someone living alone who was 65 years of age or older. The average household size was 2.23 and the average family size was 2.83.

In the village, the population was spread out, with 16.9% under the age of 18, 4.9% from 18 to 24, 31.1% from 25 to 44, 24.0% from 45 to 64, and 23.0% who were 65 years of age or older. The median age was 44 years. For every 100 females, there were 76.0 males. For every 100 females age 18 and over, there were 74.7 males.

The median income for a household in the village was $51,875, and the median income for a family was $61,875. Males had a median income of $51,023 versus $31,250 for females. The per capita income for the village was $27,990. None of the families and 1.2% of the population were living below the poverty line, including no under eighteens and 5.1% of those over 64.

== Education ==
North Kansas City School District is the area school district. It is zoned to Oakwood Manor Elementary School in Gladstone, Antioch Middle School in Gladstone, and Oak Park High School in Kansas City.

Metropolitan Community College has the North Kansas City school district in its taxation area.
