= Pleasant Valley, Missouri =

- Location of Pleasant Valley, Missouri
- Coordinates: 39°13′02″N 94°28′51″W
- Country: United States
- State: Missouri
- County: Clay
- Incorporated: 1962

Area
  - Total: 1.25 sq mi (3.25 km^{2})
  - Land: 1.25 sq mi (3.25 km^{2})
  - Water: 0 sq mi (0.00 km^{2})
- Elevation: 830 ft (250 m)

Population (2020)
  - Total: 2,743
  - Density: 2,185.2/sq mi (843.72/km^{2})
- Time zone: UTC-6 (Central (CST))
  - Summer (DST): UTC-5 (CDT)
- ZIP code: 64068
- Area code: 816
- FIPS code: 29-58520
- GNIS feature ID: 2396234
- Website: http://www.pleasantvalleymo.org/

Pleasant Valley is a city in Clay County, Missouri, United States. The population was 2,743 at the 2020 census. It is part of the Kansas City metropolitan area.

== Geography ==
Pleasant Valley is located approximately four miles north of the Missouri River and just north of the I-35-I-435 interchange.

According to the United States Census Bureau, the city has a total area of 1.23 square miles (3.19 km^{2}), all land, although Shoal Creek flows through the city.

== Demographics ==
Historical population
Census	Pop.	Note	%±
1960	1,109		—
1970	1,535		38.4%
1980	1,545		0.7%
1990	2,731		76.8%
2000	3,321		21.6%
2010	2,961		−10.8%
2020	2,743		−7.4%
U.S. Decennial Census

=== Racial and ethnic composition ===
Pleasant Valley city, Missouri – Racial and ethnic composition Note: the US Census treats Hispanic/Latino as an ethnic category. This table excludes Latinos from the racial categories and assigns them to a separate category. Hispanics/Latinos may be of any race.
Race / Ethnicity (NH = Non-Hispanic)	Pop 2000	Pop 2010	Pop 2020	% 2000	% 2010	% 2020
White alone (NH)	3,063	2,574	2,150	92.23%	86.93%	78.38%
Black or African American alone (NH)	69	134	159	2.08%	4.53%	5.80%
Native American or Alaska Native alone (NH)	24	14	21	0.72%	0.47%	0.77%
Asian alone (NH)	20	10	20	0.60%	0.34%	0.73%
Native Hawaiian or Pacific Islander alone (NH)	0	30	21	0.00%	1.01%	0.77%
Other race alone (NH)	1	3	13	0.03%	0.10%	0.47%
Mixed race or Multiracial (NH)	46	57	173	1.39%	1.93%	6.31%
Hispanic or Latino (any race)	98	139	186	2.95%	4.69%	6.78%
Total	3,321	2,961	2,743	100.00%	100.00%	100.00%

=== 2020 census ===
As of the 2020 census, Pleasant Valley had a population of 2,743. The median age was 41.7 years. 19.8% of residents were under the age of 18 and 19.9% of residents were 65 years of age or older. For every 100 females there were 97.3 males, and for every 100 females age 18 and over there were 92.9 males age 18 and over.

100.0% of residents lived in urban areas, while 0.0% lived in rural areas.

There were 1,131 households in Pleasant Valley, of which 27.9% had children under the age of 18 living in them. Of all households, 42.4% were married-couple households, 22.4% were households with a male householder and no spouse or partner present, and 26.3% were households with a female householder and no spouse or partner present. About 30.1% of all households were made up of individuals and 12.0% had someone living alone who was 65 years of age or older.

There were 1,200 housing units, of which 5.8% were vacant. The homeowner vacancy rate was 2.2% and the rental vacancy rate was 6.6%.

Racial composition as of the 2020 census
Race	Number	Percent
White	2,198	80.1%
Black or African American	161	5.9%
American Indian and Alaska Native	27	1.0%
Asian	21	0.8%
Native Hawaiian and Other Pacific Islander	21	0.8%
Some other race	43	1.6%
Two or more races	272	9.9%

=== 2010 census ===
As of the census of 2010, there were 2,961 people, 1,195 households, and 772 families living in the city. The population density was 2,407.3 inhabitants per square mile (929.5/km^{2}). There were 1,284 housing units at an average density of 1,043.9 per square mile (403.1/km^{2}). The racial makeup of the city was 89.6% White, 4.6% African American, 0.5% Native American, 0.3% Asian, 1.0% Pacific Islander, 1.2% from other races, and 2.7% from two or more races. Hispanic or Latino of any race were 4.7% of the population.

There were 1,195 households, of which 30.6% had children under the age of 18 living with them, 45.6% were married couples living together, 14.2% had a female householder with no husband present, 4.8% had a male householder with no wife present, and 35.4% were non-families. 28.4% of all households were made up of individuals, and 8.5% had someone living alone who was 65 years of age or older. The average household size was 2.40 and the average family size was 2.94.

The median age in the city was 39.9 years. 22.4% of residents were under the age of 18; 7.7% were between the ages of 18 and 24; 27.1% were from 25 to 44; 27.9% were from 45 to 64; and 14.9% were 65 years of age or older. The gender makeup of the city was 47.4% male and 52.6% female.

=== 2000 census ===
As of the census of 2000, there were 3,321 people, 1,328 households, and 873 families living in the city. The population density was 2,559.5 inhabitants per square mile (988.2/km^{2}). There were 1,385 housing units at an average density of 1,067.4 per square mile (412.1/km^{2}). The racial makeup of the city was 94.07% White, 2.20% African American, 0.75% Native American, 0.60% Asian, 0.75% from other races, and 1.63% from two or more races. Hispanic or Latino of any race were 2.95% of the population.

There were 1,328 households, out of which 32.8% had children under the age of 18 living with them, 48.1% were married couples living together, 12.0% had a female householder with no husband present, and 34.2% were non-families. 26.5% of all households were made up of individuals, and 6.9% had someone living alone who was 65 years of age or older. The average household size was 2.42 and the average family size was 2.92.

In the city, the population was spread out, with 24.2% under the age of 18, 8.4% from 18 to 24, 34.3% from 25 to 44, 21.6% from 45 to 64, and 11.4% who were 65 years of age or older. The median age was 36 years. For every 100 females, there were 94.1 males. For every 100 females age 18 and over, there were 88.2 males.

The median income for a household in the city was $48,684, and the median income for a family was $54,891. Males had a median income of $38,839 versus $25,386 for females. The per capita income for the city was $26,084. About 3.9% of families and 4.6% of the population were below the poverty line, including 6.0% of those under age 18 and 9.9% of those age 65 or over.

== Education ==
Pleasant Valley is served by the North Kansas City School District 74. Pleasant Valley Early Childhood Education Center is in the community. Pleasant Valley is zoned to Gracemor Elementary School, Maple Park Middle School, and Winnetonka High School.

Metropolitan Community College has the North Kansas City school district in its taxation area.
