= Oakwood, Hannibal, Missouri =

Neighborhood of Hannibal, Missouri

Coordinates: 39.685323°N 91.396817°W

Oakwood is a neighborhood of Hannibal, Missouri, United States.

Oakwood was named for a grove of oak trees near the original site.

The community contains Oakwood Elementary School.
