= Gladstone, Missouri =

City in Clay County, Missouri, United States

- City
- City of Gladstone
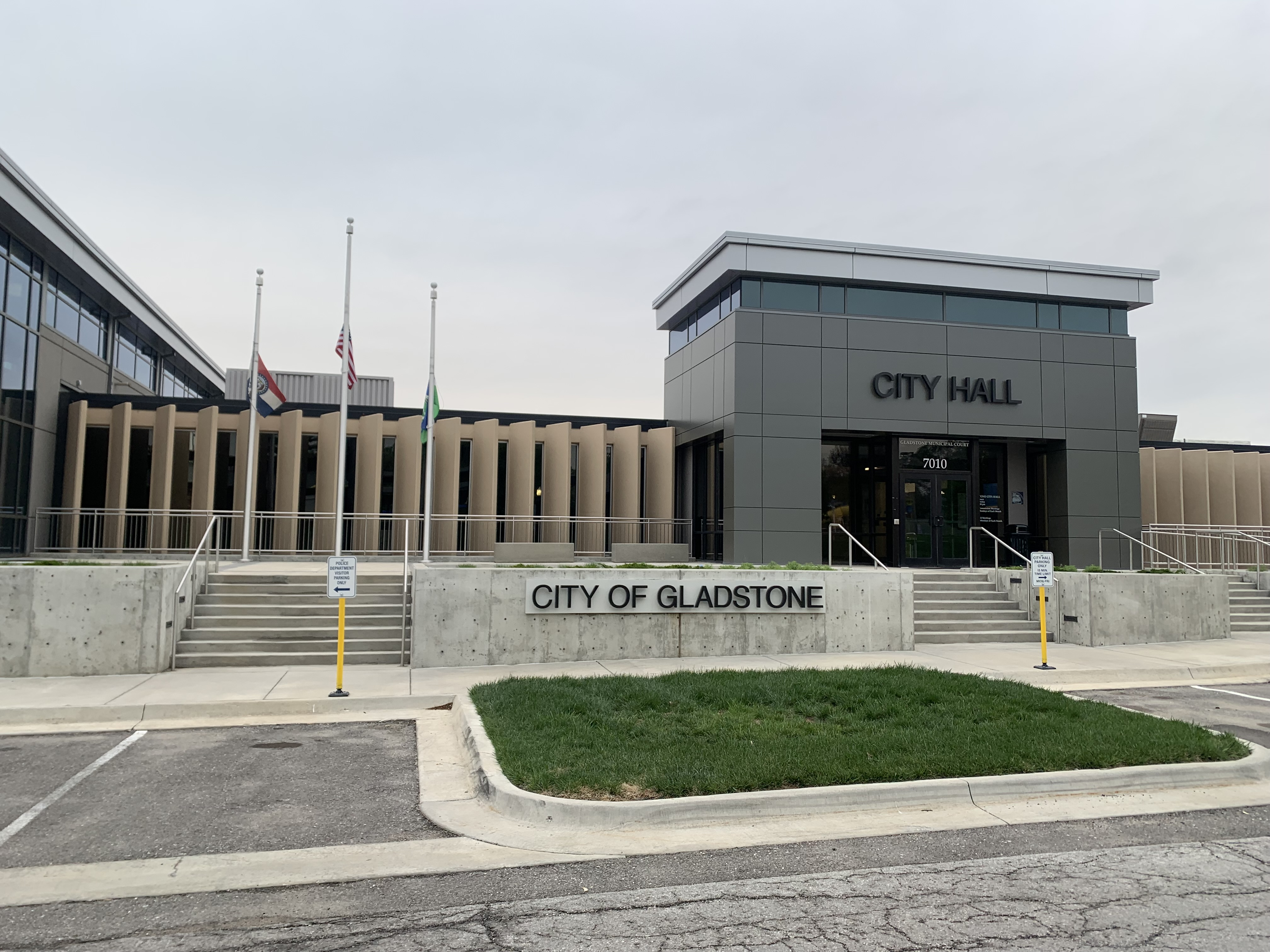
- City Hall of Gladstone, April 2025

- Location of Gladstone, Missouri
- Coordinates: 39°12′48″N 94°33′33″W
- Country: United States
- State: Missouri
- County: Clay

Area
  - Total: 8.08 sq mi (20.94 km^{2})
  - Land: 8.08 sq mi (20.93 km^{2})
  - Water: 0.0039 sq mi (0.01 km^{2})
- Elevation: 1,017 ft (310 m)

Population (2020)
  - Total: 27,063
  - Density: 3,349.5/sq mi (1,293.25/km^{2})
- Time zone: UTC−6 (Central (CST))
  - Summer (DST): UTC−5 (CDT)
- ZIP codes: 64118-64119
- Area codes: 816, 975
- FIPS code: 29-27190
- GNIS feature ID: 2394907
- Website: www.gladstone.mo.us

Gladstone is a city in Clay County, Missouri, United States and a suburb of Kansas City. The City of Gladstone is located about 10–20 minutes from downtown Kansas City, and about 10–20 minutes from Kansas City International Airport. As of the 2020 census, the city population was 27,063. It is part of the Kansas City metropolitan area.

== History ==
Settled as the area of Linden, Gladstone formally incorporated under the Missouri Constitution by popular vote in November 1952. The purpose of formation was to avoid being annexed by Kansas City.

A remnant of the mesic forested land on which Gladstone is built is preserved as the Maple Woods Natural Area, a park within Gladstone that is a National Natural Landmark. The Atkins-Johnson Farmhouse Property was listed on the National Register of Historic Places in 2007.

== Government ==
Under state statute, Gladstone is a city of the third class. It has a council-manager form of government. The City Council consists of five members popularly elected every three years, with staggered terms in office. The mayor presides over council meetings, appoints members to resident boards and commissions, meets with constituents, and signs ordinances, resolutions, contracts, and agreements authorized by the council. The City Manager administers city operations and implements policies set by the City Council.

== Geography ==
According to the United States Census Bureau, the city has a total area of 8.06 square miles (20.88 km^{2}), of which 8.05 square miles (20.85 km^{2}) is land and 0.01 square miles (0.03 km^{2}) is water.

The city is connected to nearby North Kansas City and Kansas City proper by Routes 1 and 283 as well as nearby U.S. Route 169, which sits less than 1.5 miles from the city's western border. I-29 runs near the city's southernmost tip shortly after its initial break from I-35. A handful of small subdivisions maintain independent municipalities along North Oak Trafficway, a road which is host to much of the area's shopping. The city is rectangular in shape, with the city limits generally extending from NE Englewood Road or NE 55th to NE 77th south to north, and N. Jackson Ave. to N. Broadway east to west. The city boundaries include a panhandle that goes south to NW 44th St. and from NW Briarcliff Ln. to Gladstone Waterworks Rd. from east to west. A portion of the panhandle was de-annexed by Kansas City and annexed by Gladstone in 2005 to bring the Gladstone Water Plant property within the Gladstone city limits.

There are four small enclaves in the southwest of the city. From the north they are Oakview, Oakwood Park, Oakwood, and Oaks.

== Demographics ==
Historical population
Census	Pop.	Note	%±
1960	14,502		—
1970	23,422		61.5%
1980	24,990		6.7%
1990	26,243		5.0%
2000	26,365		0.5%
2010	25,410		−3.6%
2020	27,063		6.5%
U.S. Decennial Census

=== Racial and ethnic composition ===
Gladstone city, Missouri – Racial and ethnic composition Note: the US Census treats Hispanic/Latino as an ethnic category. This table excludes Latinos from the racial categories and assigns them to a separate category. Hispanics/Latinos may be of any race.
Race / Ethnicity (NH = Non-Hispanic)	Pop 2000	Pop 2010	Pop 2020	% 2000	% 2010	% 2020
White alone (NH)	24,018	20,847	19,788	91.10%	82.04%	73.12%
Black or African American alone (NH)	533	1,287	2,155	2.02%	5.06%	7.96%
Native American or Alaska Native alone (NH)	127	129	119	0.48%	0.51%	0.44%
Asian alone (NH)	331	433	557	1.26%	1.70%	2.06%
Native Hawaiian or Pacific Islander alone (NH)	36	143	309	0.14%	0.56%	1.14%
Other race alone (NH)	27	45	134	0.10%	0.18%	0.50%
Mixed race or Multiracial (NH)	355	678	1,689	1.35%	2.67%	6.24%
Hispanic or Latino (any race)	938	1,848	2,312	3.56%	7.27%	8.54%
Total	26,365	25,410	27,063	100.00%	100.00%	100.00%

=== 2020 census ===
As of the 2020 census, Gladstone had a population of 27,063, with 11,858 households and 7,164 families. The population density was 3,349.4 per square mile (1,293.0/km^{2}).

The median age was 40.1 years. 20.0% of residents were under the age of 18 and 20.2% were 65 years of age or older. For every 100 females there were 93.8 males, and for every 100 females age 18 and over there were 90.4 males age 18 and over.

100.0% of residents lived in urban areas, while 0.0% lived in rural areas.

There were 12,472 housing units, of which 4.9% were vacant. The homeowner vacancy rate was 1.1% and the rental vacancy rate was 6.7%.

Of the 11,858 households, 24.9% had children under the age of 18 living in them. Of all households, 40.2% were married-couple households, 20.9% were households with a male householder and no spouse or partner present, and 31.0% were households with a female householder and no spouse or partner present. About 34.4% of all households were made up of individuals and 13.6% had someone living alone who was 65 years of age or older. The average household size was 2.4 and the average family size was 3.0.

Racial composition as of the 2020 census
Race	Number	Percent
White	20,427	75.5%
Black or African American	2,214	8.2%
American Indian and Alaska Native	171	0.6%
Asian	571	2.1%
Native Hawaiian and Other Pacific Islander	309	1.1%
Some other race	702	2.6%
Two or more races	2,669	9.9%

=== 2016–2020 American Community Survey ===
The 2016–2020 5-year American Community Survey estimates show that the median household income was $63,225 (with a margin of error of +/- $4,868) and the median family income was $75,905 (+/- $5,639). Males had a median income of $39,526 (+/- $2,659) versus $29,747 (+/- $3,571) for females. The median income for those above 16 years old was $35,098 (+/- $2,048). Approximately, 7.0% of families and 9.9% of the population were below the poverty line, including 21.7% of those under the age of 18 and 4.5% of those ages 65 or over.

=== 2010 census ===
At the 2010 census there were 25,410 people, 11,182 households, and 6,859 families living in the city. The population density was 3,156.5 inhabitants per square mile (1,218.7/km^{2}). There were 12,148 housing units at an average density of 1,509.1 per square mile (582.7/km^{2}). The racial makeup of the city was 85.8% White, 5.2% African American, 0.6% Native American, 1.7% Asian, 0.6% Pacific Islander, 2.6% from other races, and 3.5% from two or more races. Hispanic or Latino of any race were 7.3%.

Of the 11,182 households 27.1% had children under the age of 18 living with them, 44.5% were married couples living together, 12.3% had a female householder with no husband present, 4.6% had a male householder with no wife present, and 38.7% were non-families. 32.4% of households were one person and 12.2% were one person aged 65 or older. The average household size was 2.27 and the average family size was 2.86.

The median age was 41.7 years. 21.3% of residents were under the age of 18; 7.8% were between the ages of 18 and 24; 24.5% were from 25 to 44; 28.7% were from 45 to 64; and 17.6% were 65 or older. The gender makeup of the city was 47.9% male and 52.1% female.

=== 2000 census ===
At the 2000 census there were 26,365 people, 11,484 households, and 7,384 families living in the city. The population density was 3,297.2 inhabitants per square mile (1,273.1/km^{2}). There were 11,919 housing units at an average density of 1,490.6 per square mile (575.5/km^{2}). The racial makeup of the city was 93.25% White, 2.05% African American, 0.52% Native American, 1.26% Asian, 0.14% Pacific Islander, 1.14% from other races, and 1.65% from two or more races. Hispanic or Latino of any race were 3.56%.

Of the 11,484 households 25.7% had children under the age of 18 living with them, 51.0% were married couples living together, 10.3% had a female householder with no husband present, and 35.7% were non-families. 29.9% of households were one person and 9.1% were one person aged 65 or older. The average household size was 2.27 and the average family size was 2.82.

The age distribution was 21.0% under the age of 18, 8.6% from 18 to 24, 28.2% from 25 to 44, 26.4% from 45 to 64, and 15.9% 65 or older. The median age was 40 years. For every 100 females, there were 92.5 males. For every 100 females age 18 and over, there were 89.3 males.

The median household income was $46,333 and the median family income was $55,128. Males had a median income of $40,114 versus $27,429 for females. The per capita income for the city was $25,105. About 3.1% of families and 4.7% of the population were below the poverty line, including 5.6% of those under age 18 and 4.1% of those age 65 or over.

== Economy ==
=== Top employers ===
According to the town's 2016 Comprehensive Annual Financial Report, the top employers in the city are:

#	Employer	# of Employees
1	Wal-Mart	354
2	North Kansas City School District	335
3	Hy-Vee	280
4	City of Gladstone	196
5	Van Chevrolet	155
6	The Home Depot	117
7	McDonald's	104
8	Price Chopper	66
9	Sunsmart Technologies	12
10	QuikTrip	26

== Education ==
North Kansas City School District is the area school district. Elementary schools with sections of Gladstone in their attendance boundaries include Chapel Hill, Linden West, Meadowbrook, Oakwood Manor, Briarcliff (Kansas City), Clardy (Kansas City), and Davidson (Kansas City). The majority of Gladstone is zoned to Antioch Middle School in Gladstone and Oak Park High School in Kansas City. Portions south of NW Englewood Road are zoned to Northgate Middle School in Kansas City and North Kansas City High School in North Kansas City.

Metropolitan Community College has the North Kansas City school district in its taxation area.

Gladstone has a public library, a branch of the Mid-Continent Public Library.

== Notable people ==
- Jason Johnson, former Indianapolis Colts player
- Jerry Nolte, artist, representative to the Missouri state legislature, and Clay County Presiding Commissioner
- Melana Scantlin, Miss Missouri USA 2002 and Average Joe star

== See also ==
- List of cities in Missouri
