= Oakview, Missouri =

- Village
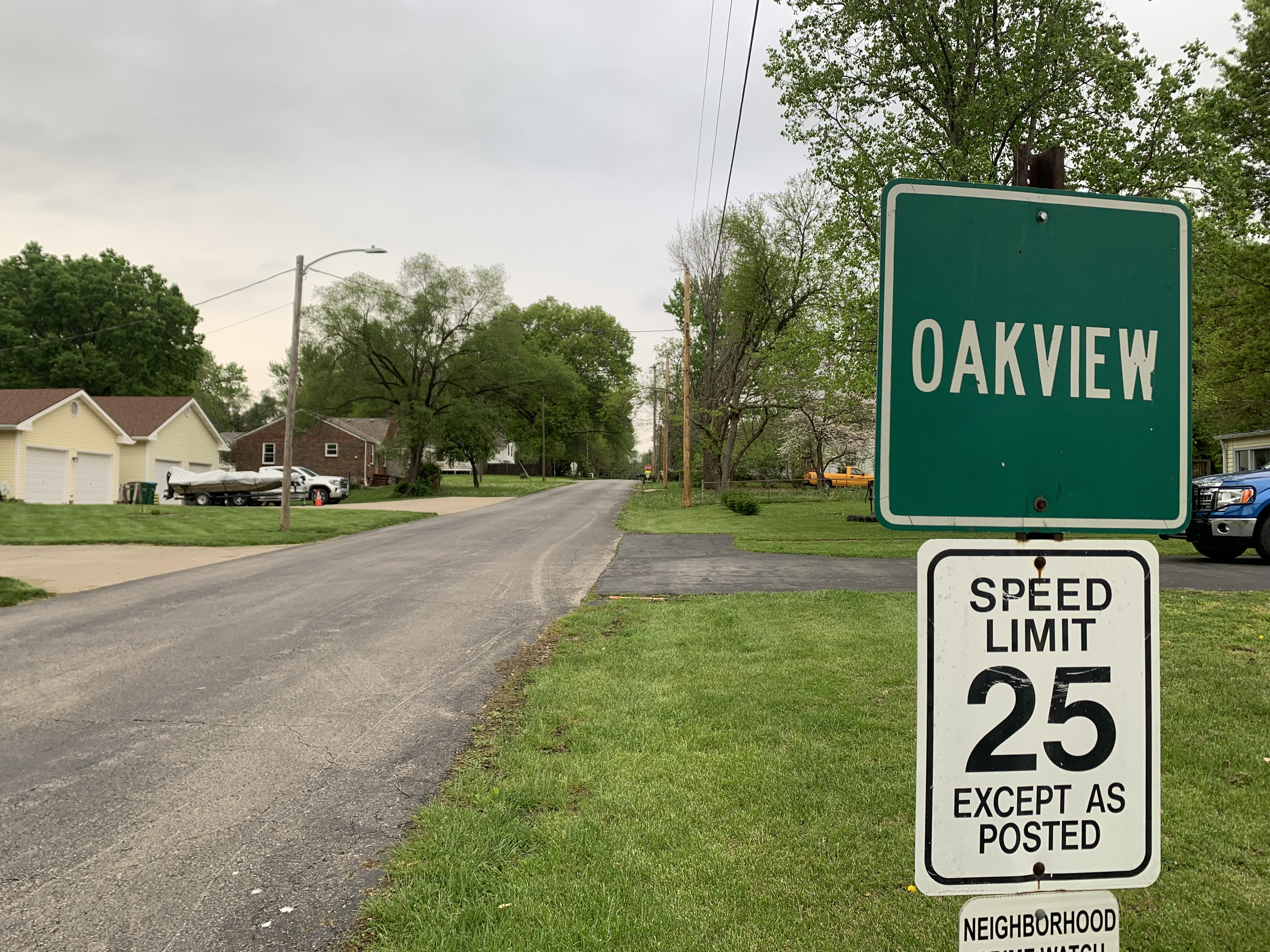
- Neighborhood in Oakview

- Location of Oakview, Missouri
- Coordinates: 39°12′31″N 94°34′13″W
- Country: United States
- State: Missouri
- County: Clay

Area
  - Total: 0.17 sq mi (0.45 km^{2})
  - Land: 0.17 sq mi (0.45 km^{2})
  - Water: 0 sq mi (0.00 km^{2})
- Elevation: 994 ft (303 m)

Population (2020)
  - Total: 366
  - Density: 2,094.8/sq mi (808.81/km^{2})
- Time zone: UTC-6 (Central (CST))
  - Summer (DST): UTC-5 (CDT)
- ZIP code: 64118
- Area code: 816
- FIPS code: 29-53858
- GNIS feature ID: 2399545
- Website: oakviewmissouri.com

Oakview is a village in Clay County, Missouri, United States. The population was 366 at the 2020 census. It is part of the Kansas City metropolitan area.

== Geography ==
According to the United States Census Bureau, the village has a total area of 0.18 square miles (0.47 km^{2}), all land.

Oakview is surrounded by Gladstone on all sides but the western part of the south side, which is bounded by the tiny residential village of Oakwood Park.

== Demographics ==
Historical population
| Census | Pop. | Note | %± |
|---|---|---|---|
| 1960 | 543 | | — |
| 1970 | 494 | | −9.0% |
| 1980 | 497 | | 0.6% |
| 1990 | 351 | | −29.4% |
| 2000 | 386 | | 10.0% |
| 2010 | 375 | | −2.8% |
| 2020 | 366 | | −2.4% |
U.S. Decennial Census

=== Racial and ethnic composition ===
Oakview village, Missouri – Racial and ethnic composition Note: the US Census treats Hispanic/Latino as an ethnic category. This table excludes Latinos from the racial categories and assigns them to a separate category. Hispanics/Latinos may be of any race.
| Race / Ethnicity (NH = Non-Hispanic) | Pop 2000 | Pop 2010 | Pop 2020 | % 2000 | % 2010 | % 2020 |
|---|---|---|---|---|---|---|
| White alone (NH) | 363 | 317 | 282 | 94.04% | 84.53% | 77.05% |
| Black or African American alone (NH) | 4 | 8 | 18 | 1.04% | 2.13% | 4.92% |
| Native American or Alaska Native alone (NH) | 9 | 9 | 4 | 2.33% | 2.40% | 1.09% |
| Asian alone (NH) | 4 | 5 | 2 | 1.04% | 1.33% | 0.55% |
| Native Hawaiian or Pacific Islander alone (NH) | 0 | 0 | 0 | 0.00% | 0.00% | 0.00% |
| Other race alone (NH) | 0 | 0 | 9 | 0.00% | 0.00% | 2.46% |
| Mixed race or Multiracial (NH) | 1 | 11 | 24 | 0.26% | 2.93% | 6.56% |
| Hispanic or Latino (any race) | 5 | 25 | 27 | 1.30% | 6.67% | 7.38% |
| Total | 386 | 375 | 366 | 100.00% | 100.00% | 100.00% |

=== 2010 census ===
As of the census of 2010, there were 375 people, 156 households, and 101 families living in the village. The population density was 2,083.3 inhabitants per square mile (804.4/km^{2}). There were 165 housing units at an average density of 916.7 per square mile (353.9/km^{2}). The racial makeup of the village was 85.9% White, 2.1% African American, 2.4% Native American, 1.3% Asian, 5.1% from other races, and 3.2% from two or more races. Hispanic or Latino of any race were 6.7% of the population.

There were 156 households, of which 28.2% had children under the age of 18 living with them, 50.6% were married couples living together, 9.0% had a female householder with no husband present, 5.1% had a male householder with no wife present, and 35.3% were non-families. 25.0% of all households were made up of individuals, and 7% had someone living alone who was 65 years of age or older. The average household size was 2.40 and the average family size was 2.97.

The median age in the village was 38.6 years. 21.3% of residents were under the age of 18; 6.3% were between the ages of 18 and 24; 30.1% were from 25 to 44; 29.9% were from 45 to 64; and 12.3% were 65 years of age or older. The gender makeup of the village was 48.8% male and 51.2% female.

=== 2000 census ===
As of the census of 2000, there were 386 people, 167 households, and 113 families living in the village. The population density was 2,236.8 inhabitants per square mile (863.6/km^{2}). There were 172 housing units at an average density of 996.7 per square mile (384.8/km^{2}). The racial makeup of the village was 95.08% White, 1.04% African American, 2.33% Native American, 1.04% Asian, 0.26% from other races, and 0.26% from two or more races. Hispanic or Latino of any race were 1.30% of the population.

There were 167 households, out of which 22.8% had children under the age of 18 living with them, 48.5% were married couples living together, 13.2% had a female householder with no husband present, and 32.3% were non-families. 25.1% of all households were made up of individuals, and 10.8% had someone living alone who was 65 years of age or older. The average household size was 2.31 and the average family size was 2.73.

In the village, the population was spread out, with 20.5% under the age of 18, 8.0% from 18 to 24, 31.9% from 25 to 44, 20.7% from 45 to 64, and 18.9% who were 65 years of age or older. The median age was 40 years. For every 100 females, there were 90.1 males. For every 100 females age 18 and over, there were 90.7 males.

The median income for a household in the village was $46,786, and the median income for a family was $56,875. Males had a median income of $34,125 versus $28,036 for females. The per capita income for the village was $22,344. About 3.4% of families and 4.9% of the population were below the poverty line, including 6.3% of those under age 18 and 12.5% of those age 65 or over.

== Education ==
North Kansas City School District is the area school district. It is zoned to Oakwood Manor Elementary School in Gladstone, Antioch Middle School in Gladstone, and Oak Park High School in Kansas City.

Metropolitan Community College has the North Kansas City school district in its taxation area.
