= Jason Johnson (offensive lineman) =

American football player (born 1974)

No. 60, 59
- Position: Center

Personal information
- Born: February 6, 1974 (age 52); Kansas City, Missouri, U.S.
- Listed height: 6 ft 3 in (1.91 m)
- Listed weight: 290 lb (132 kg)

Career information
- High school: Oak Park (Kansas City)
- College: Kansas State (1992–1996)
- NFL draft: 1997: undrafted

Career history
- Indianapolis Colts (1997–1999); Denver Broncos (2000)*
- * Offseason or practice squad member only

Awards and highlights
- Second-team All-Big 12 (1996)

Career NFL statistics
- Games played: 30
- Stats at Pro Football Reference

Jason Joseph Johnson (born February 6, 1974) is an American former professional football player who was a center for two seasons with the Indianapolis Colts of the National Football League (NFL). He played college football for the Kansas State Wildcats.

== Early life ==
Jason Joseph Johnson was born on February 6, 1974, in Kansas City, Missouri. He attended Oak Park High School in Kansas City, Missouri.

== College career ==
Johnson was a member of the Wildcats of Kansas State University from 1992 to 1996. He was redshirted in 1992 and was a four-year letterman from 1993 to 1996. He was a team captain his senior year in 1996 and was named second-team All-Big 12 by the Coaches. Johnson majored in marketing and had a 3.8 grade point average in college. He also earned Academic All-American honors twice and first-team Academic All-Conference honors three times. He was named an NFF National Scholar-Athlete in 1996. Johnson was invited to the Senior Bowl after his senior season.

== Professional career ==
Johnson signed with the Indianapolis Colts on April 25, 1997, after going undrafted in the 1997 NFL draft. He was released on September 13 and signed to the practice squad two days later. He re-signed with the Colts on December 29, 1997, after the regular season ended. Johnson played in 14 games during the 1998 season. He appeared in all 16 games in 1999 and recorded two solo tackles and one assisted tackle. He also played in one playoff game that season. Johnson became a free agent in February 2000.

Johnson was signed by the Denver Broncos on May 19, 2000. He was released on August 23, 2000.
