= Oakwood, Missouri =

- Village
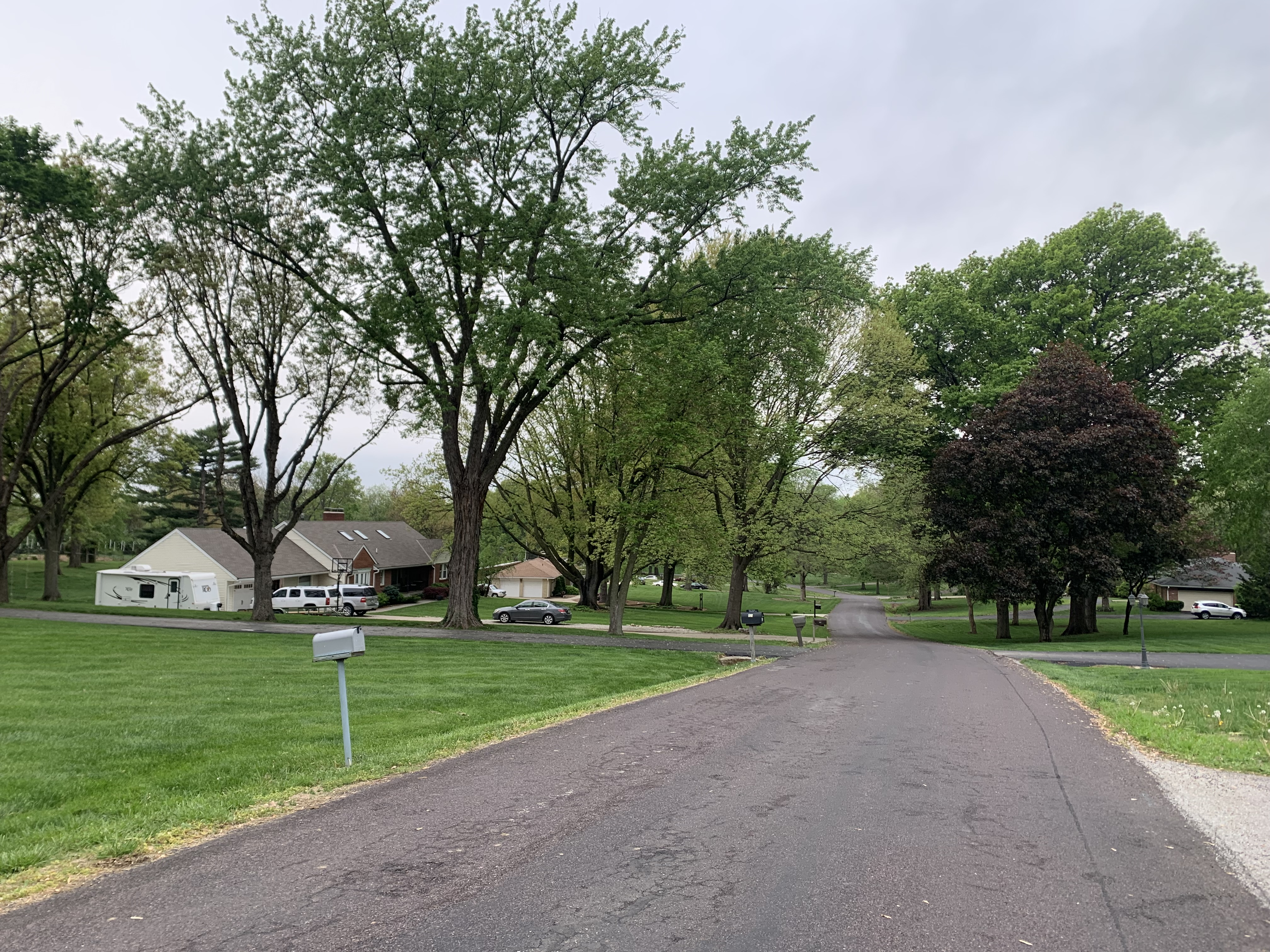
- Neighborhood in Oakwood

- Location of Oakwood, Missouri
- Coordinates: 39°12′02″N 94°34′14″W
- Country: United States
- State: Missouri
- County: Clay

Area
  - Total: 0.20 sq mi (0.51 km^{2})
  - Land: 0.20 sq mi (0.51 km^{2})
  - Water: 0 sq mi (0.00 km^{2})
- Elevation: 997 ft (304 m)

Population (2020)
  - Total: 198
  - Density: 1,002.9/sq mi (387.24/km^{2})
- Time zone: UTC-6 (Central (CST))
  - Summer (DST): UTC-5 (CDT)
- ZIP code: 64118
- Area codes: 816 and 975
- FIPS code: 29-53894
- GNIS feature ID: 2399548
- Website: www.villageofoakwood.org

Oakwood is a village in Clay County, Missouri, United States. The population was 198 at the 2020 census. It is part of the Kansas City metropolitan area.

Oakwood was laid out in the early 1920s, and named for a grove of oak trees near the original town site.

== Geography ==
According to the United States Census Bureau, the village has a total area of 0.20 square miles (0.52 km^{2}), all land.

Oakwood is bordered by Gladstone on its west, east, and the east part of its north side, while west part of the north side is bounded by the neighboring village of Oakwood Park. The southern boundary meets that of Oaks, with the exception of a small portion of Oakwood that borders the Davidson neighborhood of Kansas City on its easternmost point.

== Government ==
The village board of trustees meets in the Antioch Branch of the Mid-Continent Public Library in Gladstone.

== Demographics ==
Historical population
Census	Pop.	Note	%±
1960	159		—
1970	201		26.4%
1980	227		12.9%
1990	212		−6.6%
2000	197		−7.1%
2010	185		−6.1%
2020	198		7.0%
U.S. Decennial Census

=== Racial and ethnic composition ===
Oakwood village, Missouri – Racial and ethnic composition Note: the US Census treats Hispanic/Latino as an ethnic category. This table excludes Latinos from the racial categories and assigns them to a separate category. Hispanics/Latinos may be of any race.
Race / Ethnicity (NH = Non-Hispanic)	Pop 2000	Pop 2010	Pop 2020	% 2000	% 2010	% 2020
White alone (NH)	187	171	189	94.92%	92.43%	95.45%
Black or African American alone (NH)	0	0	0	0.00%	0.00%	0.00%
Native American or Alaska Native alone (NH)	1	3	0	0.51%	1.62%	0.00%
Asian alone (NH)	3	0	0	1.52%	0.00%	0.00%
Native Hawaiian or Pacific Islander alone (NH)	0	0	0	0.00%	0.00%	0.00%
Other race alone (NH)	0	0	0	0.00%	0.00%	0.00%
Mixed race or Multiracial (NH)	0	0	5	0.00%	0.00%	2.53%
Hispanic or Latino (any race)	6	11	4	3.05%	5.95%	2.02%
Total	197	185	198	100.00%	100.00%	100.00%

=== 2010 census ===
As of the census of 2010, there were 185 people, 78 households, and 58 families living in the village. The population density was 925.0 inhabitants per square mile (357.1/km^{2}). There were 80 housing units at an average density of 400.0 per square mile (154.4/km^{2}). The racial makeup of the village was 97.3% White, 1.6% Native American, and 1.1% from other races. Hispanic or Latino of any race were 5.9% of the population.

There were 78 households, of which 17.9% had children under the age of 18 living with them, 70.5% were married couples living together, 1.3% had a female householder with no husband present, 2.6% had a male householder with no wife present, and 25.6% were non-families. 24.4% of all households were made up of individuals, and 10.3% had someone living alone who was 65 years of age or older. The average household size was 2.37 and the average family size was 2.79.

The median age in the village was 55.6 years. 17.3% of residents were under the age of 18; 3.3% were between the ages of 18 and 24; 11.4% were from 25 to 44; 40.1% were from 45 to 64; and 28.1% were 65 years of age or older. The gender makeup of the village was 50.8% male and 49.2% female.

=== 2000 census ===
As of the census of 2000, there were 197 people, 75 households, and 71 families living in the village. The population density was 989.5 inhabitants per square mile (382.0/km^{2}). There were 78 housing units at an average density of 391.8 per square mile (151.3/km^{2}). The racial makeup of the village was 97.46% White, 0.51% Native American, 1.52% Asian, 0.51% from other races. Hispanic or Latino of any race were 3.05% of the population.

There were 75 households, out of which 25.3% had children under the age of 18 living with them, 89.3% were married couples living together, 4.0% had a female householder with no husband present, and 5.3% were non-families. 5.3% of all households were made up of individuals, and 1.3% had someone living alone who was 65 years of age or older. The average household size was 2.63 and the average family size was 2.72.

In the village, the population was spread out, with 20.3% under the age of 18, 4.6% from 18 to 24, 15.7% from 25 to 44, 35.0% from 45 to 64, and 24.4% who were 65 years of age or older. The median age was 50 years. For every 100 females, there were 107.4 males. For every 100 females age 18 and over, there were 98.7 males.

The median income for a household in the village was $81,412, and the median income for a family was $83,387. Males had a median income of $56,250 versus $36,750 for females. The per capita income for the village was $35,242. None of the population or families were below the poverty line.

== Education ==
North Kansas City School District is the area school district. It is zoned to Oakwood Manor Elementary School in Gladstone, Antioch Middle School in Gladstone, and Oak Park High School in Kansas City.

Metropolitan Community College has the North Kansas City school district in its taxation area.
