= Edward Quick =

American politician

Edward E. Quick (February 16, 1935 – August 27, 2016) was an American Democratic politician who served in the Missouri Senate as majority leader, minority leader, and Pro Tem, represented Clay County, Missouri, for 20 years. He also served on the Kansas City city council between the mid-1970s and the mid-1980s and as Clay County presiding commissioner for four years until 2010. One of his accomplishments was becoming the first president pro tempore for the Missouri Senate from Kansas City in four decades.

Born in Rich Hill, Missouri, Quick attended school in Higginsville, Missouri. He had worked as a compliance officer for a wood product company and a Kansas City firefighter. Quick died of chronic obstructive pulmonary disease in 2016 at age 81.
