= Oak Park High School (Missouri) =

Location
- 825 N.E. 79th Terr. Kansas City, Missouri 64118; United States; 39.236986°N 94.569794°W

Information
- Type: Public
- Motto: For The Family Engage. Explore. Empower.
- Established: 1965
- School district: North Kansas City School District
- Principal: Molly Smith
- Staff: 98.56 (FTE)
- Grades: 9–12
- Enrollment: 1,755 (2024–2025)
- Student to teacher ratio: 17.81
- Colors: Navy, Columbia blue, white, silver
- Mascot: Northmen
- Website: Oak Park High School

Oak Park High School is a high school in the North Kansas City School District in Kansas City, Missouri, United States. The student body is composed of ninth through twelfth grade students, with a 2017 enrollment of 1,549. The school's mascot is "Norman the Northman", a lumberjack character. The school is adjacent to Oak Grove Park in Gladstone, Missouri. The school's current principal is Molly Smith.

Its boundary includes the majority of Gladstone (sections north of NW Englewood Road). The boundary also includes Oaks, Oakview, Oakwood, and Oakwood Park.

== History ==
When Oak Park High School opened in 1965, it was the only North Kansas City high school with air conditioning. It also featured open-concept classrooms, a theater in the round, bookstore and four outdoor courtyards.

Dan Kahler was the school's original principal. The first Oak Park students graduated in 1966. Formerly, students attended North Kansas City High School located in North Kansas City, Missouri. Before being transferred to Oak Park, these students chose the school's colors, mascot, and wrote its alma mater.

Past Oak Park High School principals:

- Dan Kahler (1965-1986)
- Robert West (1986-1994)
- Benny Cain (1994-2000)
- John Krueger (2000-2006)
- Fred Skretta (2006-2011)
- Joe Hesman (2011-2013)
- Gary Miller (2013 interim)
- Mark Maus (2013-2016)
- Christopher Sartain (2016–2021)
- Chris McCann (2021-2022)
- Molly Smith (2022–present)

In 2015 and in 2023 the student body elected a transgender girl as its homecoming queen. In response to this, the Westboro Baptist Church protested the school.

== Awards ==
Oak Park was named a 2018 National Model High School by the International Center for Leadership in Education. They are one of only eight high schools in the nation to receive this distinction. Specifically, they were chosen for their high expectations for all students. Oak Park received a score of 99.6% in 2015-2016 from the Missouri Department of Elementary and Secondary Education on their annual performance review.

== Mascot ==
Oak Park students chose Northmen as their mascot as the northernmost high school in Kansas City at the time of the school's opening. The school's mascot was named "Norman the Northman", a lumberjack, embracing a tree theme fitting Oak Park and neighboring Oak Grove Park. The original newspaper was called "The Northman's Log," now produced as a magazine, and the yearbook named the "Cambia", a reference to vascular cambium which makeup the rings of a tree that can be counted to tell its age.

== Athletics ==
Oak Park has seven state championships in wrestling, six in baseball, three in cheerleading, and one in basketball.

The varsity football team plays its home games at the Oak Park Athletics Complex they played there first game in 2021 the concession stand on the Complex serves nearby Oak Grove Park in Gladstone, Missouri.

Competitive teams include:

Men's and women's teams

- Soccer (men in fall/women in spring)
- Swimming and diving (men in fall/women in winter)
- Tennis (women in fall/men in spring)
- Golf (women in fall/men in spring)
- Track and field (spring)
- Cross country (fall)
- Basketball (winter)
- Wrestling (winter)
- Cheerleading (year round)
- Volleyball (women in fall/men in spring

Men's only

- Baseball (spring)
- Football (fall)

Women's only

- Softball (fall)
- Pom/dance squad (year-round)
- Flag Football (Spring)

== Notable alumni ==
- Ochai Agbaji, NBA player for the Brooklyn Nets and the Utah Jazz; former player at the University of Kansas, NCAA champion, First Team All-American, 2022 Final Four Most Outstanding Player, 2022 Big 12 Player of the Year
- Kevin Ellis, Major League Soccer and Major Arena Soccer League player
- Jessica Harp, country music singer
- Jason Johnson, National Football League player
- Rick Parker, Major League Baseball player
- Ramona Riley-Bozier, college volleyball coach
- Ray Saari, Major Arena Soccer League player for Kansas City Comets
- Ryan Silvey, Missouri legislator
- Chris Stigall, radio DJ
