= Luann Ridgeway =

American politician

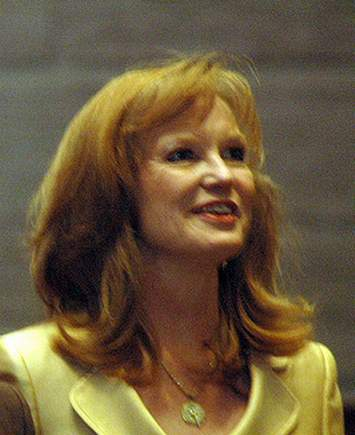

Member of the Missouri House of Representatives
- In office 1992–2020

Luann Ridgeway is an attorney who served in several elected government offices. A Republican, she served as a member of the Missouri House of Representatives elected in 1992 and serving through 2002 and Missouri Senate elected in 2004 and serving through 2012. Ridgeway served as the Eastern District Commissioner of Clay County, Missouri, elected 2012 through 2020. She announced she would not run for reelection in 2020 and returned to private life in 2021.

== Biography ==
Ridgeway was born and raised in Moberly, Missouri. She attended William Woods University and Westminster College, Missouri. Ridgeway received the prestigious Presidential Scholars Award while attending Williams Woods University. She received a BA degree with Magna Cum Laude honors at William Woods University with a double major in political science and history. She received her JD degree at University of Missouri-Kansas City, and also studied at American University and Oxford University.

Ridgeway is an active participant in Bible-based ministries. She served as a Baptist Home Missionary to New Harvest Church (near St. Joseph, Missouri) for several years before returning as a pianist to her home church (Mount Zion Baptist Church, Edgerton, Missouri). She is currently affiliated with another congregation in the greater Kansas City area. She is a current or former member of the Missouri Farm Bureau, the Kiwanis Club (past president), the Rotary Club, the Chamber of Commerce, the Missouri Bar Association, the Clay County Bar Association, the Missouri Baptist Theological Seminary Board of Regents and the William Woods University Board of Trustees.

Ridgeway resides in rural Clay County, near Smithville, Missouri. She operated her own general-practice law firm in Smithville for several years before entering public service. She married Dr. Richard Ridgeway in 1984. In 2020, they celebrated their 36th anniversary. In 2021, she returned to private life.

== Political career ==
Ridgeway was first elected to the Missouri House of Representatives in 1992, and served there until 2002. While in the House, she served on the House Judiciary Committee and was Ranking Member of that committee from 1995-2002.

While serving in the Missouri House in 1994, Ridgeway was selected as a delegate to the American Council Of Young Political Leaders (ACYPL). She was sent to represent Missouri and the U.S. to Russia and Ukraine. The purpose of the delegation was to open further dialogue between political leaders in the U.S. and countries formerly a part of the recently dismantled Soviet Union.

She was elected to the Missouri State Senate in 2004 and 2008. She was elected Majority Caucus Chair by fellow senators. She served as the Chair of the Joint Committee of Administrative Rules; was the Vice Chair of the following committees: Rules, Joint Rules, Resolutions and Ethics; Small Business and Insurance; and, served on the following committees: Appropriations, Commerce, Energy and the Environment and the Joint Committee on Capital Improvements.

In 2012, Ridgeway was elected to a four-year term as the Eastern District Commissioner of Clay County, Missouri with 63.49% of the vote.

In 2016, Ridgeway was re-elected to a four-year term as the Eastern District Commissioner of Clay County, Missouri with 61.7% of the vote.

In 2020, Ridgeway announced she would not run for re-election as Commissioner and entered into what she happily referred to as “self-imposed term limits”. She returned to private life in 2021.
