= Clay County, Missouri =

County in Missouri, United States

- County
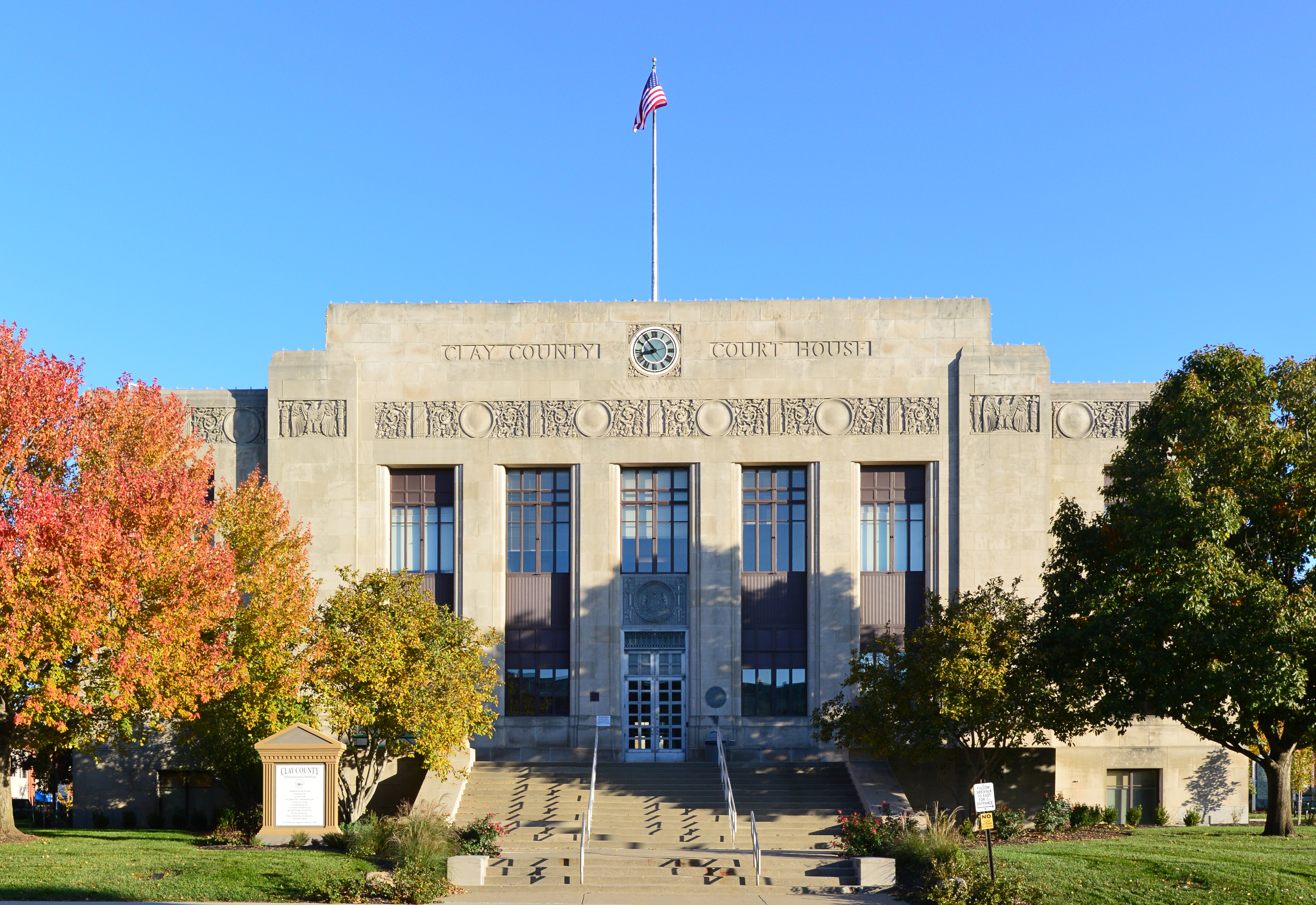
- South side of the Clay County Courthouse (designed by Wight and Wight) in Liberty

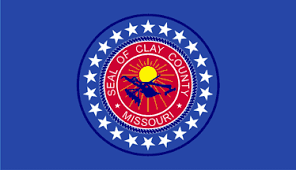
- Flag

- Location within the U.S. state of Missouri
- Coordinates: 39°19′N 94°25′W
- Country: United States
- State: Missouri
- Founded: January 2, 1822
- Named for: Henry Clay
- Seat: Liberty
- Largest city: Kansas City

Area
  - Total: 409 sq mi (1,060 km^{2})
  - Land: 397 sq mi (1,030 km^{2})
  - Water: 11 sq mi (28 km^{2}) 2.8%

Population (2020)
  - Total: 253,335
  - Estimate (2025): 265,032 ▲
  - Density: 620/sq mi (240/km^{2})
- Time zone: UTC−6 (Central)
  - Summer (DST): UTC−5 (CDT)
- Congressional districts: 5th, 6th
- Website: www.claycountymo.gov

Clay County is located in the U.S. state of Missouri and is part of the Kansas City metropolitan area. As of the 2020 census, the county had a population of 253,335, making it the fifth-most populous county in Missouri. Its county seat is Liberty. The county was organized January 2, 1822, and named in honor of U.S. Representative Henry Clay from Kentucky, later a member of the United States Senate and United States Secretary of State. Clay County contains many of the area's northern suburbs, along with a portion of the city of Kansas City, Missouri. It also owns and operates the Midwest National Air Center in Excelsior Springs.

== History ==
Clay County was settled primarily by migrants from the Upper Southern states of Kentucky, Tennessee, and Virginia. They brought slaves and slaveholding traditions with them, and quickly started cultivating crops similar to those in Middle Tennessee and Kentucky: hemp and tobacco. Clay was one of several counties settled mostly by Southerners to the north and south of the Missouri River. Given their culture and traditions, this area became known as Little Dixie. In 1860, enslaved persons made up 25% or more of the county's population.

The 1828 execution of Annice, an enslaved woman owned by Jeremiah Prior, was the first to occur in Clay County. She was also the first female slave executed in the state of Missouri.

Many members of the Church of Jesus Christ of Latter Day Saints found refuge in Clay County in November 1833 after they were driven from Jackson County, Missouri. In 1836, mobs and the Missouri State militia drove the members of the church from the county. Leaders of this church, most notably Joseph Smith, were imprisoned for some months in Clay County in the jail at Liberty. In May 2012, the LDS Church built the Kansas City Missouri Temple six miles southwest of the Liberty Jail site at 7001 Searcy Creek Parkway in Kansas City, Missouri.

== Geography ==
According to the U.S. Census Bureau, the county has a total area of 409 square miles (1,060 km^{2}), of which 397 square miles (1,030 km^{2}) is land and 11 square miles (28 km^{2}) (2.8%) is covered by water. It is the fourth-smallest county in Missouri by area.

=== Adjacent counties ===
- Clinton County (north)
- Ray County (east)
- Jackson County (south)
- Wyandotte County, Kansas (southwest)
- Platte County (west)

=== Major highways ===
- I-29
- I-35
- I-435
- US 69
- US 71
- US 169
- Route 1
- Route 9
- Route 10
- Route 33
- Route 92
- Route 110 (CKC)
- Route 152
- Route 283
- Route 291

== Demographics ==
Historical population
Census	Pop.	Note	%±
1830	5,338		—
1840	8,283		55.2%
1850	10,382		25.3%
1860	13,023		25.4%
1870	15,564		19.5%
1880	15,571		0.0%
1890	19,856		27.5%
1900	18,903		−4.8%
1910	20,302		7.4%
1920	20,455		0.8%
1930	26,811		31.1%
1940	30,417		13.4%
1950	45,221		48.7%
1960	87,474		93.4%
1970	123,322		41.0%
1980	136,488		10.7%
1990	153,411		12.4%
2000	184,006		19.9%
2010	221,939		20.6%
2020	253,335		14.1%
2025 (est.)	265,032	▲	4.6%
U.S. Decennial Census; 1790-1960 1900-1990; 1990-2000 2010-2019

=== 2020 census ===
As of the 2020 census, the county had a population of 253,335. The median age was 37.3 years. 24.5% of residents were under the age of 18 and 14.7% of residents were 65 years of age or older. For every 100 females there were 95.7 males, and for every 100 females age 18 and over there were 92.7 males age 18 and over.

The racial makeup of the county was 78.4% White, 7.2% Black or African American, 0.6% American Indian and Alaska Native, 2.4% Asian, 0.4% Native Hawaiian and Pacific Islander, 2.3% from some other race, and 8.6% from two or more races. Hispanic or Latino residents of any race comprised 7.4% of the population.

91.9% of residents lived in urban areas, while 8.1% lived in rural areas.

There were 100,254 households in the county, of which 32.5% had children under the age of 18 living with them and 25.9% had a female householder with no spouse or partner present. About 27.5% of all households were made up of individuals and 9.9% had someone living alone who was 65 years of age or older.

There were 105,619 housing units, of which 5.1% were vacant. Among occupied housing units, 67.6% were owner-occupied and 32.4% were renter-occupied. The homeowner vacancy rate was 1.3% and the rental vacancy rate was 7.3%.

=== Racial and ethnic composition ===
Clay County, Missouri – Racial and ethnic composition Note: the US Census treats Hispanic/Latino as an ethnic category. This table excludes Latinos from the racial categories and assigns them to a separate category. Hispanics/Latinos may be of any race.
Race / Ethnicity (NH = Non-Hispanic)	Pop 1980	Pop 1990	Pop 2000	Pop 2010	Pop 2020	% 1980	% 1990	% 2000	% 2010	% 2020
White alone (NH)	133,050	147,721	166,445	186,611	193,282	87.69%	86.93%	90.46%	84.08%	76.30%
Black or African American alone (NH)	1,449	2,693	4,794	11,220	17,853	10.39%	10.66%	2.61%	5.06%	7.05%
Native American or Alaska Native alone (NH)	509	18,873	798	1,015	1,009	0.25%	0.37%	0.43%	0.46%	0.40%
Asian alone (NH)	23,088	40,087	2,456	4,503	6,059	0.47%	0.78%	1.33%	2.03%	2.39%
Native Hawaiian or Pacific Islander alone (NH)	x	x	155	549	1,004	x	x	0.08%	0.25%	0.40%
Other race alone (NH)	7,152	2,419	181	272	1,012	0.15%	0.05%	0.10%	0.12%	0.40%
Mixed race or Multiracial (NH)	x	x	2,583	4,668	14,266	x	x	1.40%	2.10%	5.63%
Hispanic or Latino (any race)	51,653	61,702	6,594	13,101	18,850	1.05%	1.21%	3.58%	5.90%	7.44%
Total	136,488	153,411	184,006	221,939	253,335	100.00%	100.00%	100.00%	100.00%	100.00%

=== 2010 census ===
As of the 2010 census, 221,939 people, 72,558 households, and 50,137 families resided in the county. The population density was 558 people per square mile (215 people/km^{2}). The 93,918 housing units averaged 236 per square mile (91/km^{2}).

The racial makeup of the county was 87.46% White, 5.18% Black or African American, 0.53% Native American, 2.05% Asian, 0.26% Pacific Islander, 1.77% from other races, and 2.75% from two or more races. About 5.90% of the population were Hispanic or Latino of any race.

Of the 72,558 households, 33.80% had children under the age of 18 living with them, 55.40% were married couples living together, 10.20% had a female householder with no husband present, and 30.90% were not families. About 25.20% of all households were made up of individuals, and 7.40% had someone living alone who was 65 years of age or older. The average household size was 2.50 and the average family size was 3.00.

In the county, the population was distributed as 25.80% under the age of 18, 8.70% from 18 to 24, 32.30% from 25 to 44, 22.30% from 45 to 64, and 10.80% who were 65 years of age or older. The median age was 35 years. For every 100 females, there were 94.60 males. For every 100 females age 18 and over, there were 91.80 males.

In 2010 the median income for a household in the county was $48,347, and for a family was $56,772. Males had a median income of $40,148 versus $27,681 for females. The per capita income for the county was $23,144. About 3.80% of families and 5.50% of the population were below the poverty line, including 6.40% of those under age 18 and 5.50% of those age 65 or over.

=== 2015 estimate ===
In 2015 the median income for a household in Clay County was $62,099. The income per capita in Clay County was $29,793.

=== 2000 census ===
As of the 2000 census, 23.3% were of German, 14.5% American, 11.0% English, 10.8% Irish, and 5.6% Italian ancestry.

=== Registered voters ===
As of 2022, there are 176,536 registered voters.

== Education ==
School districts include:

K-12:

- Excelsior Springs 40 School District
- Kearney R-I School District
- Lawson R-XIV School District
- Liberty Public School District
- North Kansas City School District
- Platte County School District Number 3
- Clinton County R-III School District
- Smithville R-II School District

Elementary-only district:

- Missouri City 56 School District

=== Public schools ===
- Excelsior Springs School District No. 40 – Excelsior Springs
  - Lewis Elementary School (PK–5)
  - Cornerstone Elementary School (K–5)
  - Elkhorn Elementary School (K-5)
  - Excelsior Springs Middle School (6–8)
  - Excelsior Springs High School (9–12)
  - Excelsior Springs Technical High School (12) – Alternative/Technical School
- Kearney R-I School District – Kearney
  - Dogwood Elementary School (K–5)
  - Hawthorne Elementary School (K–5)
  - Kearney Elementary School (K–5)
  - Southview Elementary School (K–5)
  - Kearney Middle School (6–7)
  - Kearney Junior High School (8–9)
  - Kearney High School (10–12)
- Liberty School District No. 53 – Liberty
  - Liberty Early Childhood Education Center (PreK)
  - Alexander Doniphan Elementary School (K–5)
  - Franklin Elementary School (K–5)
  - Kellybrook Elementary School (K–5) – Kansas City
  - Lewis & Clark Elementary School (K–5)
  - Liberty Oaks Elementary School (K–5) – Kansas City
  - Lillian Schumacher Elementary School (K–5)
  - Manor Hill Elementary School (K–5)
  - Ridgeview Elementary School (K–5)
  - Shoal Creek Elementary School (K–5)
  - Warren Hills Elementary School (K–5)
  - Liberty Middle School (6–8)
  - South Valley Middle School (6–8)
  - Heritage Middle School (6–8)
  - Discovery Middle School (6–8)
  - Liberty High School (9–12)
  - Liberty North High School (9–12)
- Missouri City School District No. 56 – Missouri City
  - Missouri City Elementary School (K–8)
- North Kansas City School District No. 74 – North Kansas City
  - Bell Prairie Elementary School (K–5)
  - Briarcliff Elementary School (K–5)
  - Chapel Hill Elementary School (K–5)
  - Chouteu Elementary School (Pre-K–5)
  - Clardy Elementary School (2–5)
  - Crestview Elementary School (K–5)
  - Davidson Elementary School (Pre-K–5)
  - Fox Hill Elementary School (K–5)
  - Gashland Elementary School (K–1)
  - Gracemor Elementary School (Pre-K–5)
  - Lakewood Elementary School (Pre-K–5)
  - Linden West Elementary School (K–5) – Gladstone
  - Maplewood Elementary School (K–5)
  - Meadowbrook Elementary School (K–5)
  - Nashua Elementary School (K–5)
  - Northview Elementary School (K–5)
  - Oakwood Manor Elementary School (K–5)
  - Ravenwood Elementary School (K–5)
  - Rising Hill Elementary School (K-5)
  - Topping Elementary School (K–5)
  - West Englewood Elementary School (Pre-K–5)
  - Winnwood Elementary School (Pre-K–5)
  - Antioch Middle School (6–8)
  - Eastgate 6th Grade Center (6)
  - Gateway 6th Grade Center (6)
  - Maple Park Middle School (6–8)
  - New Mark Middle School (6–8)
  - Northgate Middle School (6–8)
  - North Kansas City High School (9–12)
  - Oak Park High School (Missouri) (9–12)
  - Staley High School (9–12)
  - Winnetonka High School (9–12)
- Smithville R-II School District – Smithville
  - Smithville Maple Elementary School (Pre-K–6)
  - Smithville Horizon Elementary School (Pre-K-6)
  - Smithville Eagle Heights Elementary School (Pre-K-6)
  - Smithville Middle School (7–8)
  - Smithville High School (9–12)

=== Private schools ===
- Northland Christian School - Kansas City (Preschool-12) - Independent Christian
- Kalos Christian Academy - Kansas City (K–12) - Nondenominational Christian
- Outreach Christian Early Education Center – Avondale (Pre-K–12) – Nondenominational Christian
- Oakhill Day School – Gladstone (Pre-K–7) – Nonsectarian – (Special Programs Emphasis)
- St. Andrew the Apostle Parish School – Gladstone (K–9) – Roman Catholic
- Northern Hills Christian Academy – Holt (K–9) – Baptist
- Prairie Church School – Holt (K–6)
- Covenant Memorial Baptist Day School – Kansas City (K) – Baptist
- Eagle Heights Christian School – Kansas City (Pre-K–12) – Baptist
- Faith Academy – Kansas City (Pre-K–12) – Nondenominational Christian
- Refine KC School - Kansas City (K-12)
- St. Charles Borromeo School – Kansas City (K–9) – Roman Catholic
- St. Gabriel Catholic School –Kansas City (K–9) – Roman Catholic
- St. Patrick School – Kansas City (NS/Pre-K–8) – Roman Catholic
- St. Pius X High School – Kansas City (9–12) – Roman Catholic
- Liberty Montessori Center – Liberty (K–1) – Montessori
- St. James School – Liberty (K–9) – Roman Catholic

=== Postsecondary ===
- Maple Woods :: Metropolitan Community College—Kansas City—A public, two-year Liberal Arts college
  - MCC has a service area that includes all of the county, though only the portions in the Liberty and North Kansas City school districts are in the community college district's in-district taxation zone.
- William Jewell College – Liberty – A private, four-year Liberal Arts college.

== Libraries, archives, museums ==
=== Libraries ===
- Mid-Continent Public Library
- North Kansas City Public Library

=== Archives ===
- Clay County Archives

=== Museums ===
- Atkins-Johnson Farm and Museum
- Clay County Museum and Historical Society
- Excelsior Springs Museum and Archives
- Jesse James Bank Museum
- Jesse James Birthplace
- Kearney Historic Museum
- Smithville Historical Museum
- The Rabbit hOle

== Communities ==
=== Cities and towns ===
- Avondale
- Birmingham
- Claycomo
- Excelsior Estates (mostly in Ray County)
- Excelsior Springs (small part in Ray County)
- Gladstone
- Glenaire
- Holt (partly in Clinton County)
- Independence (mostly in Jackson County)
- Kansas City (partly in Jackson and Platte Counties and a small part in Cass County)
- Kearney
- Lawson (partly in Ray County)
- Liberty (county seat)
- Missouri City
- Mosby
- North Kansas City
- Oaks
- Oakview
- Oakwood
- Oakwood Park
- Pleasant Valley
- Prathersville
- Randolph
- Smithville (small part in Platte County)
- Sugar Creek (mostly in Jackson County)

=== Census-designated place ===
- Paradise

=== Unincorporated communities ===
- Arley
- Chandler
- Claysville
- Clevenger
- Ectonville
- Miltondale
- Roosterville
- Stockdale
- Winner

=== Population ranking ===
The population ranking of the following table is based on the 2020 US census of Clay County.

† County seat
†† Partly within adjacent counties

Rank	Name	Municipal Type	Population
1	Kansas City ††	Home Rule	508,090
2	Liberty †	Special Charter	30,167
3	Gladstone	3rd Class City	27,063
4	Excelsior Springs ††	4th Class City	10,553
5	Smithville ††	4th Class City	10,406
6	Kearney	4th Class City	10,404
7	North Kansas City	3rd Class City	4,467
8	Pleasant Valley	4th Class City	2,743
9	Lawson ††	4th Class City	2,541
10	Claycomo	Village	1,343
11	Glenaire	4th Class City	539
12	Holt ††	4th Class City	471
13	Avondale	4th Class City	436
14	Oakview	Village	366
15	Missouri City	4th Class City	217
16	Excelsior Estates ††	4th Class City	209
17	Oakwood	Village	198
18	Birmingham	Village	189
19	Oakwood Park	Village	189
20	Oaks	Village	128
21	Prathersville	Village	121
22	Mosby	4th Class City	101
23	Paradise	CDP	75
24	Randolph	4th Class City	57

== Notable people ==
- Noah Beery (1882–1946), actor
- Wallace Beery (1885–1949), actor
- Obediah Summers (1844–1896), formerly enslaved, AME minister, and Civil War veteran; born in Clay County
- Frank James (1843–1915), outlaw, Confederate States guerrilla, and train robber; born in Clay County
- Jesse James (1847–1882), outlaw, born in Clay County
- John Ellis Martineau (1873–1937), Governor of Arkansas from 1927 to 1928, born in Clay County
- Jesse Sexton (1885–1948), state senator 1936 to 1948

== Politics ==
=== Local ===
Clay County, Missouri

Elected countywide officials
Assessor	Tracy Baldwin	Republican
Commissioner (presiding)	Jerry Nolte	Republican
Commissioner (eastern district)	Jay Johnson	Nonpartisan
Commissioner (eastern district)	Megan Thompson	Republican
Commissioner (eastern at-large)	JoAnn Lawson	Nonpartisan
Commissioner (western district)	Jon Carpenter	Democratic
Commissioner (western district)	Scott Wagner	Nonpartisan
Commissioner (western at-large)	Jason Withington	Nonpartisan
Prosecuting Attorney	Zachary Thompson	Nonpartisan
Sheriff	Will Akin	Republican

Clay County, like the rest of Missouri, has swung to the Republican Party in the 21st century, though the margins have been very close. In 2000, Democrat Al Gore famously won the county by one vote. The county, holding Kansas City, is mainly suburban in culture and remains competitive. In 2016, Donald Trump won the county while Hillary Clinton failed to improve on Barack Obama's percentages with only 41% of the vote. Joe Biden, however, did improve on those margins, winning nearly 47% of the vote in 2020; Trump still carried the county by 4%.

United States presidential election results for Clay County, Missouri
Year	Republican		Democratic		Third party(ies)	
Year	No.	%	No.	%	No.	%
1888	1,103	22.62%	3,628	74.39%	146	2.99%
1892	738	16.73%	3,085	69.92%	589	13.35%
1896	924	18.25%	4,071	80.42%	67	1.32%
1900	921	20.04%	3,585	78.00%	90	1.96%
1904	1,077	26.70%	2,832	70.22%	124	3.07%
1908	1,166	24.63%	3,513	74.19%	56	1.18%
1912	592	12.47%	3,417	72.00%	737	15.53%
1916	1,307	24.83%	3,902	74.13%	55	1.04%
1920	2,804	30.75%	6,283	68.91%	31	0.34%
1924	2,998	31.69%	6,076	64.24%	385	4.07%
1928	5,584	49.92%	5,574	49.83%	27	0.24%
1932	3,117	24.71%	9,398	74.52%	97	0.77%
1936	4,491	31.89%	9,535	67.70%	58	0.41%
1940	6,159	38.83%	9,672	60.98%	30	0.19%
1944	6,724	43.53%	8,682	56.21%	40	0.26%
1948	6,408	35.01%	11,855	64.77%	41	0.22%
1952	13,043	50.95%	12,502	48.84%	53	0.21%
1956	13,436	49.69%	13,605	50.31%	0	0.00%
1960	18,955	52.26%	17,318	47.74%	0	0.00%
1964	13,997	36.84%	23,993	63.16%	0	0.00%
1968	19,643	44.48%	17,547	39.73%	6,972	15.79%
1972	33,017	69.43%	14,538	30.57%	0	0.00%
1976	24,962	47.71%	26,609	50.86%	744	1.42%
1980	28,521	50.65%	24,250	43.06%	3,543	6.29%
1984	36,529	61.79%	22,586	38.21%	0	0.00%
1988	30,293	50.26%	29,620	49.15%	357	0.59%
1992	23,798	31.40%	30,565	40.33%	21,415	28.26%
1996	28,935	41.85%	32,603	47.15%	7,609	11.00%
2000	39,083	48.75%	39,084	48.75%	2,006	2.50%
2004	51,193	53.07%	44,670	46.31%	597	0.62%
2008	54,516	49.55%	53,761	48.86%	1,748	1.59%
2012	56,191	52.99%	47,310	44.61%	2,542	2.40%
2016	57,476	51.70%	45,304	40.75%	8,390	7.55%
2020	64,605	51.04%	59,400	46.93%	2,564	2.03%
2024	67,688	52.00%	60,345	46.36%	2,127	1.63%

== See also ==
- List of counties in Missouri
- Mormon War (1838)
- National Register of Historic Places listings in Clay County, Missouri
