= Arley =

Arley may refer to:

== Places ==
=== England ===
- Arley, Cheshire, a village
  - Arley Hall, Cheshire
- Arley, Warwickshire, a village
- Upper Arley, a village in Worcestershire
  - Arley railway station, on the Severn Valley Railway

=== United States ===
- Arley, Alabama, a town
- Arley, Missouri, an unincorporated community

== People ==
- Arley (footballer) (born 1986), Brazilian footballer
- Arley Calderón (born 1999), Cuban weightlifter
