= Missouri Route 152 =

State highway in Missouri, U.S.

Route 152
- MO 152 highlighted in red

Route information
- Maintained by MoDOT
- Length: 16.875 mi (27.158 km)

Major junctions
- West end: I-435 / Route N in Parkville
- I-29 / US 71 in Kansas City; US 169 in Kansas City; Route 1 near Gladstone; I-435 west of Liberty; I-35 / US 69 / Route 110 (CKC) in Liberty
- East end: Route 291 in Liberty

Location
- Country: United States
- State: Missouri

Highway system
- Missouri State Highway System; Interstate; US; State; Supplemental
← Route 151	→ Route 153

Route 152 is a state highway in the northern Kansas City metropolitan area. It begins at Interstate 435 south of the Kansas City International Airport and ends at Route 291 in Liberty. The route is a limited-access highway between its two junctions with I-435. It crosses I-29 five miles (8.0 km) south of the airport in Platte County and US 169 in Clay County.

== History ==
The original route, established in 1827, was called "Military Road" and connected the Liberty Arsenal with Fort Leavenworth. In the North Kansas City area, Military Road was renamed Barry Road in 1829 after the newly established town of Barry, which in turn is named after the postmaster-general William Taylor Barry. The road remained marked Highway 152. A short extension of Barry Road, identified as Highway 152, was created between 1980 and 1982. Proper construction of Highway 152 did not continue until 1990. Barry Road, the original Highway 152, runs parallel to the current Highway 152 on its south side on the west side and parallel to 152 on the north side in the eastern portions. According to satellite imagery, the freeway section of the highway was completely finished sometime between September 2005 and February 2006. In 2008, the Kansas City City Council approved a master plan for Kansas City International Airport that called for extensive improvements to the road so it could become a main thoroughfare to the proposed Central Terminal on the south side of the airport by 2025.

== Route Description ==
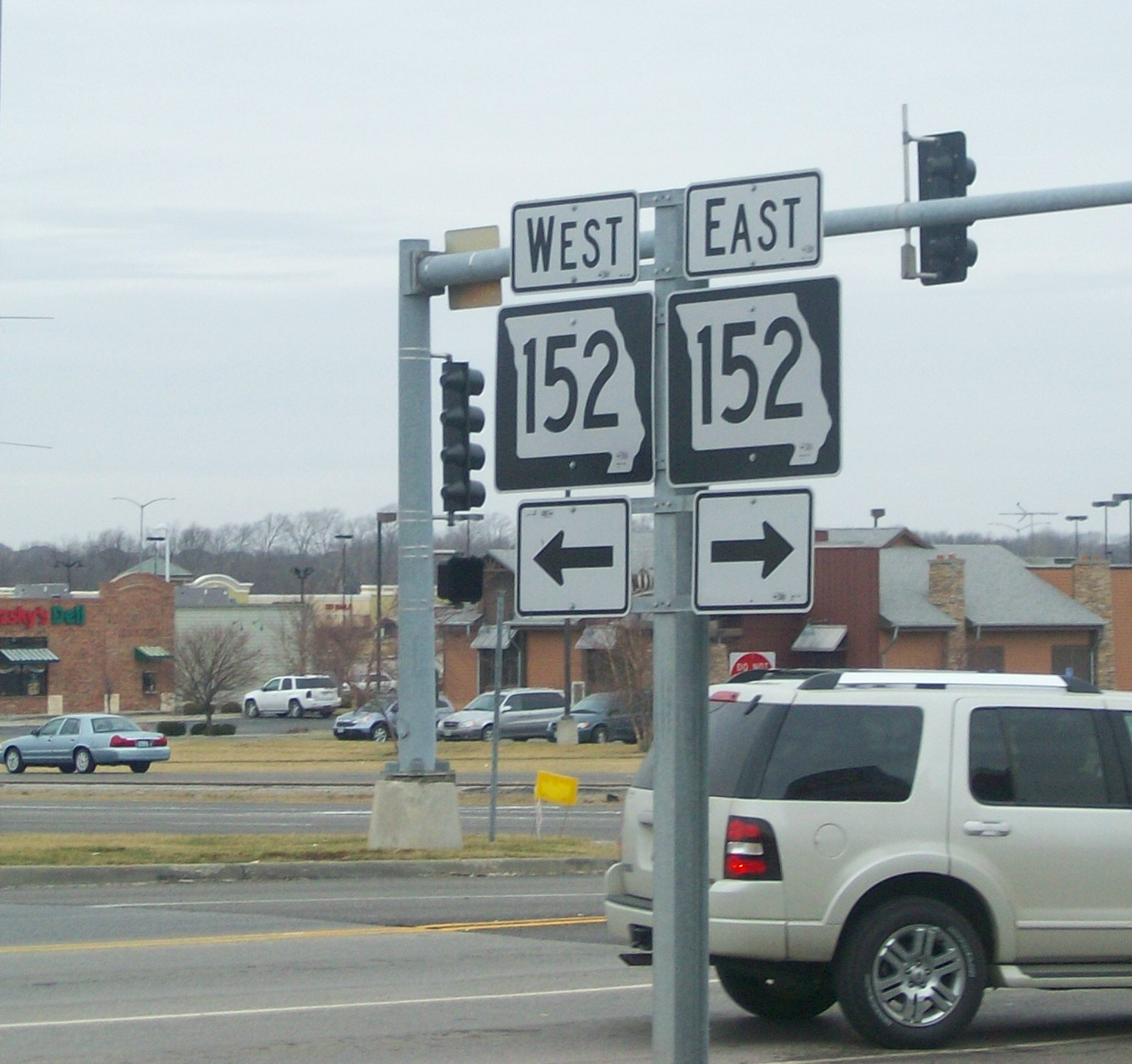
Signs denoting Route 152 in Liberty.

Missouri Route 152 begins at the junction between Route N and I-435 at Exit 24 in Parkville. It travels east and enters Kansas City, where it continues northeast and east along the outskirts of the northern neighborhoods of Kansas City. It continues east through the Prairie Point-Wildberry neighborhood where it junctions with I-29/US 71 at Exit 9, then enters the Coves North. Leaving Coves North, the highway travels northeast, intersects US 169 and continues east through the Kansas City neighborhoods of Sherrydale and Gashland, where it turns southeast after its intersection with the Maplewoods Parkway. In the southeast of Gashland, Route 152 intersects Route 1 then continues easterly to its junction with the ring road I-435 again at Exit 49, and continues east through the northeast portion of Kansas City until it enters Liberty at the intersection with I-35 at the southwest point of the Liberty Triangle. The route finishing at the southeast corner of the Liberty Triangle with its intersection with Route 291.

== Junction list ==
County	Location	mi	km	Destinations	Notes
Platte	Parkville	0.000– 0.323	0.000– 0.520	I-435 – Kansas City International Airport, St. Joseph, Topeka; Route N	I-435 exit 24; continuation as Route N.
Platte	Kansas City	1.328	2.137	Route K (NW Hampton Road)	West end of freeway.
Platte	Kansas City	3.904	6.283	Amity Avenue	
Platte	Kansas City	4.931	7.936	Congress Avenue	Eastbound exit and westbound entrance only
Platte	Kansas City	5.146– 5.784	8.282– 9.308	I-29 / US 71 – Kansas City International Airport, St. Joseph, Downtown Kansas City	I-29 exits 9A-B.
Platte	Kansas City	5.906	9.505	Ambassador Drive	Westbound exit and eastbound entrance only
Platte	Kansas City	6.915	11.129	Green Hills Road – Lake Waukomis	
Platte	Kansas City	8.566	13.786	Platte Purchase Drive	Diverging diamond interchange
Clay	Kansas City	8.916– 9.674	14.349– 15.569	US 169 (Arrowhead Trafficway) – Smithville, Kansas City	
Clay	Kansas City	9.952	16.016	North Oak Trafficway	
Clay	Kansas City	10.933	17.595	Maplewoods Parkway	
Clay	Kansas City	12.292	19.782	Route 1 (Indiana Avenue) – Gladstone	
Clay	Kansas City	13.347	21.480	Brighton Avenue	
Clay	Kansas City	13.727– 14.403	22.091– 23.179	I-435 – St. Joseph, St. Louis	I-435 exits 49A-B; east end of freeway.
Clay	Liberty	16.765– 16.875	26.981– 27.158	I-35 / US 69 / Route 110 (CKC) – Des Moines, Downtown Kansas City	I-35 exit 16.
Clay	Liberty			Route 291	Eastern terminus of Route 152
1.000 mi = 1.609 km; 1.000 km = 0.621 mi: Incomplete access

== Future ==
Route 152 might be extended to Leavenworth, Kansas in the future.
