= Tin ceiling =

Victorian ceilings with patterned tin

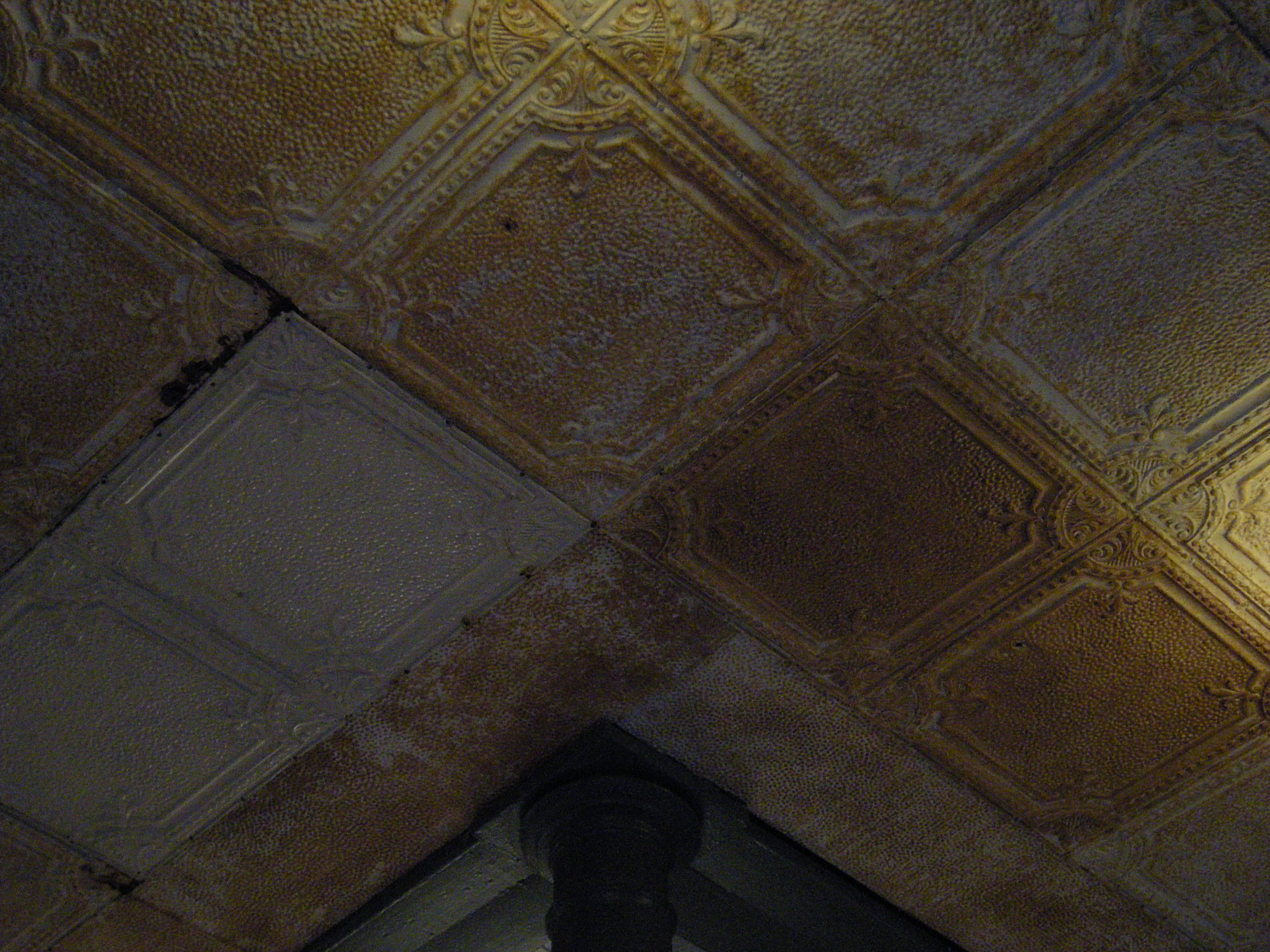
Pressed tin ceiling over a store entrance in Bellingham, Washington, U.S.A.

A tin ceiling is an architectural element, consisting of a ceiling finished with tinplate with designs pressed into them, that was very popular in Victorian buildings in North America in the late 19th and early 20th century. They were also popular in Australia where they were commonly known as pressed metal ceilings or Wunderlich ceilings (after the main Australian manufacturer Wunderlich). They were also used in South Africa.

== History ==
Tin ceilings were introduced to North America as an affordable alternative to the exquisite plasterwork used in European homes. They gained popularity in the late 1800s as Americans sought sophisticated interior design. Durable and lightweight, tin ceilings were appealing to home and business owners alike as a functionally attractive design element that was readily available. Important critics such as John Ruskin, George Gilbert Scott, Charles Eastlake and William Morris debated the implications of faux materials. These critics believed it was morally wrong and deceptive to imitate another material and blamed the degradation of society towards the "art of shamming" rather than honesty in architecture. Nevertheless, tin ceilings lasted longer than plaster ones and were easier to clean. They encapsulated ideas of democracy, making such decoration available to the middle class majority who supported the machine production.

Tin ceiling tiles were an American innovation that emerged in the late 19th century as a more affordable, durable alternative to intricate plaster ceilings popular in European architecture. These pressed metal panels democratized decorative ceilings by making decorative ornamentation accessible beyond the wealthiest classes. Pressed metal ornamentation became widespread from the 1880s to the 1930s, with manufacturers using thin iron sheets initially, followed by tin-plated steel painted white to mimic plaster.

Decorative metal ceilings were first made of corrugated iron sheets, appearing in the United States by the early 1870s. It was during the late Victorian era that thin rolled tin-plate was being mass-produced. Tinplate was originally made from dipping iron in molten tin in order to prevent rust. Later, steel replaced iron as the more cost-effective solution. Tinplate was not the only sheet metal used to make stamped ceilings. Copper, lead (known as ternplate) and zinc were other common architectural metals in the industry.

Between 1890 and 1930, approximately forty-five companies in the United States marketed metal ceilings; most were in Ohio, Pennsylvania, and New York, located along railroad lines that served as the main routes for delivering the pressed metal products directly to contractors. The Wheeling Corrugating Company out of Wheeling, West Virginia, became the leading tin ceiling manufacturer in the late 1800s. At that time, Wheeling Corrugating was a large steel mill that also made products from their steel sheets such as roofing and siding.

Sheets of tin were stamped one at a time using rope drop hammers and cast iron molds. Using this method of production, metal was sandwiched between two interlocking tools. The top tool, or "ram," was lifted up by a rope or chain, then dropped down onto the bottom die, smashing into the metal that was underneath and permanently embedding intricate patterns into the tin. Someone who saw the merit of this modern machine for its artistic potential was Frank Lloyd Wright. In his articles, "The Art and Craft of the Machine" and "In the Cause of Architecture," the series published by Architectural Record, Wright elaborates on his modern theory of science and art and the role of the machine in the future of art.

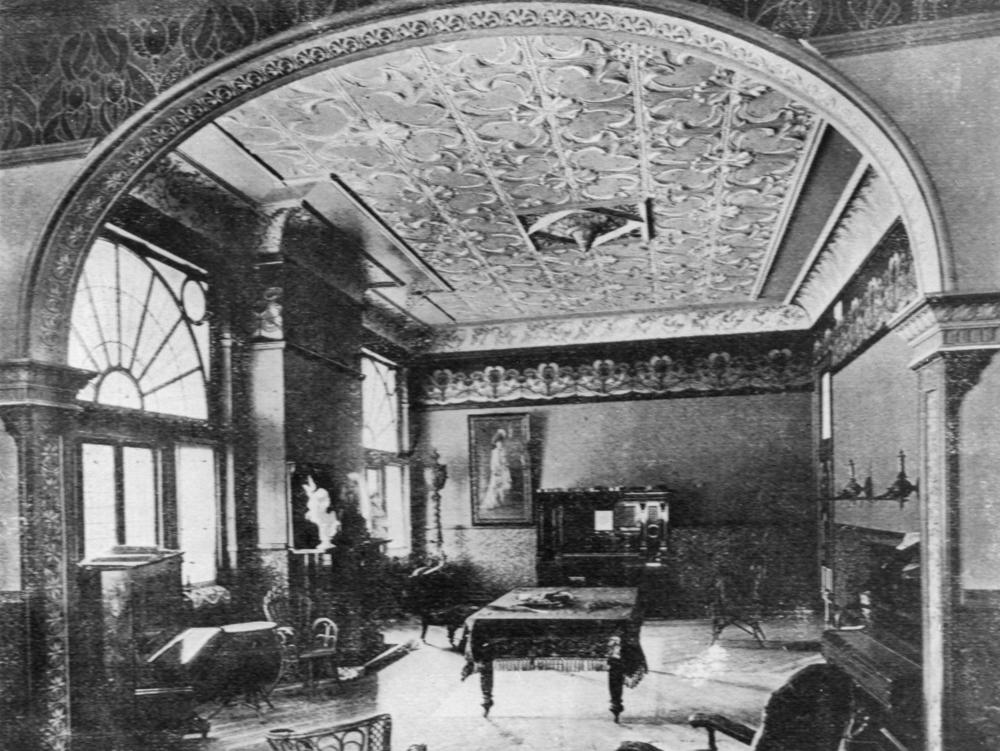
Tin ceiling in a private music room, Queensland, Australia, 1906

Tin ceilings were traditionally painted white to give the appearance of hand-carved or molded plaster. They were incorporated into residential living rooms and parlors as well as schools, hospitals and commercial businesses where painted tin was often used as wainscoting.

In the 1930s, tin ceilings began to lose their popularity and steel materials became scarce because of the effort to collect scrap metal during WWII. Many sheet metal companies began making other products in order to stay in business. In the 21st century, some renewed interest has been shown in tin ceilings. The increase in interest has stemmed from businesses that were renovating and an interest to return to the nostalgia of the turn of the century. Still to this day there exists a manufacturing company by the name of W.F. Norman Corporation that produces original tin ceilings and ornaments from the same rope drop hammers as it once did in 1898. Several other companies offer conventional tin ceilings as well as panels made to fit into a drop-ceiling grid.

Interest in decorative metal ceilings revived in the late 20th century, particularly in the 1980s and beyond, as historic preservation and Victorian design aesthetics grew in popularity. Today, many manufacturers produce both historically accurate reproductions and modern interpretations of tin panels for residential and commercial interiors.

== Restoration ==
Tin ceilings were built to last, and in the absence of prolonged moisture damage leading to corrosion, they usually did; however, the wear and tear over the hundred years since the heyday of tin has led to a burgeoning restoration industry. Magazines such as The Old-House Journal were created to offer articles about restoration, repair and installation practices for historic preservation of tin ceilings.

Environmental hazards from the lead paint used on turn of the century tin ceilings mean that this is a job for experts in the field. Often restoration is achieved by simply stripping old paint, treating the metal with a protective base coat, patching minor damaged areas, and repainting. In some cases, where small sections of a ceiling have been damaged, partial restoration is needed. Panels can be easily replaced through companies that still manufacture original design components. If, however, a ceiling requires a historic pattern that is no longer in production, good quality panels from the existing ceiling may be used to create a mold and new customized tin can be pressed.

If full restoration is needed, meaning no part of the existing ceiling remains structurally sound, a professional can help design a new ceiling appropriate for the period and structure using existing molds or creating reproductions based on photographic evidence or architectural drawings. This latter method can be extremely expensive, and is not cost effective, due to the cost of making a custom mold for the panel and usually the metal trim that was also used with the original project.

More detailed information for repair and replacement of decorative metal ceilings can be found in the National Park Service Technical Preservation Services.

== Modern adaptation ==
Several companies now offer hand-painted finishes for metalwork, as well as a more permanent look that can be achieved with powder-coated finishes. For the low end of the market, imitation panels are pressed from plastic or aluminum. Tin is now fashionably used for art work, back splashes, cabinet faces, wainscoting and much more. For over 100 years the tin panel was made with nail rails around the outside of the panel, designed to overlap each other. Panels were nailed into wood furring strips which were prevalent prior to the invention of plywood. Today, nail up panels can be easily brad nailed or hand nailed, into plywood without the need for the original 1-by-2-inch (25 mm × 51 mm) furring strips. There is also a patented interlocking tin panel that will screw directly into existing drywall/popcorn/plaster ceilings, without the need for extensive plywood installation. Tin panels today are made in 24-by-24-inch (610 mm × 610 mm) and 24-by-48-inch (610 mm × 1,220 mm) sizes for easier handling and one-person installation. Today, most tin ceiling manufacturers actually use recycled blackplate steel in a thickness of only 0.010 inches (0.25 mm). There are some manufacturers who also use actual tin plated steel, which is simply the blackplate steel with a thin coating of bright tin plate adhered to the base metal. Other manufacturers utilize aluminum, as it is rustproof and will last a lifetime. This finish is also an option with dropped ceilings.

Contemporary producers of tin ceilings often reproduce historic patterns using original press molds or tailor designs based on samples collected from turn‑of‑the‑century buildings. Modern finishes, including powder‑coating and a wide range of colors, have expanded the material’s aesthetic possibilities beyond its original white plaster‑mimicry.
