= Charlie Lee (American football coach) =

American football coach

Personal information
- Born: February 28, 1945 (age 81); Kansas City, Missouri

Career information
- High school: Liberty High School (Liberty, Missouri)
- College: Northern Arizona

Career history

Coaching
- Central High School, Kansas City, MO (1970-1972) Head coach; Northwest Missouri State (1973) Assistant coach and assistant dean of students; Arizona (1974-1976) Offensive backs coach and recruiter; Purdue (1977) Offensive backs coach and recruiter; Texas (1977-1981) Wide receiver coach and recruiter; Denver Broncos (1981) Offensive backfield coach

Operations
- Denver Broncos (1982–1984) Director of public relations; Denver Broncos (1985–1992) Director of player and community relations; Denver Broncos (1993–1998) College scout

Awards and highlights
- 2x Super Bowl champion; XXXII; XXIII

Charlie Lee is a former college football player, college football coach, and NFL football coach, scout, and front office executive. Born February 28, 1945.

== Early life and playing career ==
After graduating from Liberty High School (Liberty, Missouri) in 1963, Lee attended Northern Arizona University where he played running back (1963–1966). Lee was a co-captain and twice named as honorable mention on the Little All-America football team. In 1984, Lee was inducted into the Northern Arizona University Athletics Hall of Fame

== Coaching career ==
In 1969, Lee was hired as assistant football coach and assistant track coach at Central High School (Kansas City, Missouri). In the winter of 1970, Lee was promoted to head coach of both programs and coached both squads through 1972. Under Lee’s tutelage, the Central track & field teams won three Missouri State High School Activities Association state team titles. Among the players Lee coached at Central were future USC and NFL players Eric Williams and Ken Randle. When Williams was inducted into the Missouri Sports Hall of Fame in 2016 after an 8-year NFL career, he credited Lee as being a key factor in his success.

In 1973, Lee was hired as an assistant football coach at Northwest Missouri State where he spent the 1973 season. Lee was the first black coach of a major sport in the history of Northwest Missouri State University’s league, the Mid-America Intercollegiate Athletics Association.

After only 5 months at Northwest Missouri, Lee was hired as a backfield coach and recruiter at Arizona under head coach Jim Young in February 1974. Lee was the second black assistant football coach ever to coach at Arizona. Lee was preceded as a black coach at Arizona only by Willie Peete who coached at Arizona from 1971–1982 before going on to an NFL coaching career.

Lee coached three seasons (1974-1976) at Arizona before leaving with Young to coach at Purdue when Young was hired as the new head football coach at Purdue in December 1976.

Before coaching a game at Purdue, Lee left to join the staff of new Texas head football coach Fred Akers in July 1977. Lee was the second black full-time assistant football coach to coach a game at the University of Texas. Prenis Williams, an assistant coach under Head Coach Darrell Royal, was the first black full-time assistant coach at the University of Texas from 1974-1976. Active NFL player Alvin Matthews was a part-time assistant coach during 1972-1973 and was the first black football coach hired at Texas. Hired as wide receiver coach and recruiter, Lee replaced Jimmy Raye who had left Wyoming to join Akers at Texas when Akers was hired in December 1976. However, Raye left Texas after only five months and before coaching a game at to join the NFL San Francisco 49ers as a wide receiver coach. Lee coached at Texas from 1977 through 1981. During his tenure at Texas, the Longhorns played in 4 bowl games including the 1978 Cotton Bowl where an undefeated Texas team led by Earl Campbell lost to a Notre Dame squad led by Joe Montana in the de facto National Championship game. Lee recruited many of the players that led the Texas to a 10-1-1 season, a win in the 1982 Cotton Bowl, and a #2 final Associated Press national ranking. Lee also recruited many of the 12 Longhorn players that were taken in the 1983 NFL draft and 17 Texas players that were drafted in the 1984 NFL draft.

In 1981, Lee was hired away from Texas to become offensive backfield coach on the staff of new Denver Broncos head coach Dan Reeves. Lee was the first black coach hired in the history of the Denver Broncos franchise. Lee coached running backs for the Broncos during the 1981 season in which the Broncos finished with a record of 10-6 and tied for 1st place with the San Diego Chargers in the AFC West.

== Executive career ==
After the 1981 season and one year as an assistant coach, Lee was promoted to a Bronco front office role as Director of Public Relations. Lee was the first black front office executive ever employed by the Broncos. Lee held that role from 1982 through 1984

In 1985 Lee was promoted to Broncos Director of Player & Community Relations, a role that he held from 1985-1993.

In 1993, Lee transitioned to the role of Broncos College Scout that he held from 1993-1998. During his time as a College Scout, Lee scouted and signed future 3-time NFL Pro Bowler Rod Smith as an undrafted free agent in 1994. Smith credits Lee with believing in him as an NFL prospect when other NFL scouts didn’t. Smith had two major knee injuries during his college football career at Missouri Southern University that deterred most scouts from considering him a potential NFL player.

During Lee’s 18-year career with the Denver Broncos, the Broncos won seven AFC West titles, five AFC Championships, and two Super Bowls. After leaving the Broncos, Lee taught social studies at South Valley Middle School in the Liberty, Missouri school district for 14 years until retiring in 2015.
