= Glenaire =

Glenaire may refer to:

- Glenaire, Missouri, United States, a city
- Glenaire, Virginia, United States, an unincorporated community
- Glenaire, Victoria, Shire of Colac Otway, Victoria, Australia
