= Roosterville =

Roosterville may refer to:

- Roosterville, Georgia, unincorporated community in Heard County, Georgia, United States
- Roosterville, Missouri, populated place in Clay County, Missouri, United States
- Roosterville, Ohio, unincorporated place in Morgan County, Ohio
- Dellrose, Tennessee, formerly known as Roosterville, United States
