= Senator Sexton =

Senator Sexton may refer to:

- Franklin Barlow Sexton (1828–1900), Texas State Senate
- Jesse Sexton (1885–1948), Missouri State Senate
- Landon Sexton (born 1941), Kentucky State Senate
- Mike Sexton (politician) (born 1961), Iowa State Senate
