= South Valley Junior High School =

South Valley Junior High School may refer to:

- South Valley Junior High School (Gilbert, Arizona). See Gilbert Public Schools.
- South Valley Junior High School (Liberty, Missouri). See Liberty Public School District.
