= Winner, Missouri =

Unincorporated community in Missouri, U.S.

Coordinates: 39°19′57″N 94°29′31″W

Winner is an unincorporated community in Clay County, in the U.S. state of Missouri.

== History ==
A post office called Winner was established in 1891, and remained in operation until 1900. W. E. Winner, the founder, gave the community his last name.
