= Sears, Roebuck and Company Warehouse Building (North Kansas City, Missouri) =

- U.S. National Register of Historic Places
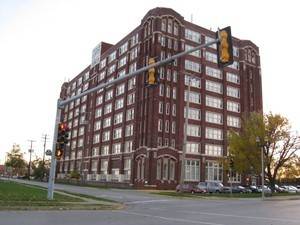
- Sears warehouse, September 2012

- Location within Missouri Location within the United States
- Location: 715 Armour Rd., North Kansas City, Missouri
- Coordinates: 39°8′32″N 94°34′17″W
- Area: 2.4 acres (0.97 ha)
- Built: 1912-1913
- Architect: Nimmons, George C.
- Architectural style: Late Gothic Revival, Chicago
- NRHP reference No.: 97000411
- Added to NRHP: May 9, 1997

Sears, Roebuck and Company Warehouse Building, also known as Missouri Poster and Sign Company, Inc. and Bellas Hess Antique Mall, is a historic warehouse building located in North Kansas City, Missouri. It was built in 1912–1923, and is a nine-story building built as a merchandise warehouse for Sears. The building features Late Gothic Revival and Chicago school style design elements. It has since been adaptively reused as apartments and is now known as Park Lofts.

It was listed on the National Register of Historic Places in 1997.
