= Claysville, Clay County, Missouri =

Unincorporated community in Missouri, US

Coordinates: 39°23′40″N 94°12′51″W

Claysville is an unincorporated community in Clay County, Missouri, United States.

Claysville is named after Kentucky statesman Henry Clay.
