= Clevenger, Missouri =

Unincorporated community in Missouri, U.S.

Coordinates: 39°14′12″N 94°13′18″W

Clevenger is an unincorporated community in Clay County, in the U.S. state of Missouri.

The community most likely was named for the local Clevenger family.
