= Miltondale, Missouri =

Unincorporated community in Missouri, U.S.

Coordinates: 39°15′30″N 94°13′20″W

Miltondale is an unincorporated community in Clay County, in the U.S. state of Missouri.

== History ==
A post office called Miltondale was established in 1895, and remained in operation until 1906. The community most likely derives its name from Milton Moore, an early settler.
