= Ectonville, Missouri =

- Unincorporated community
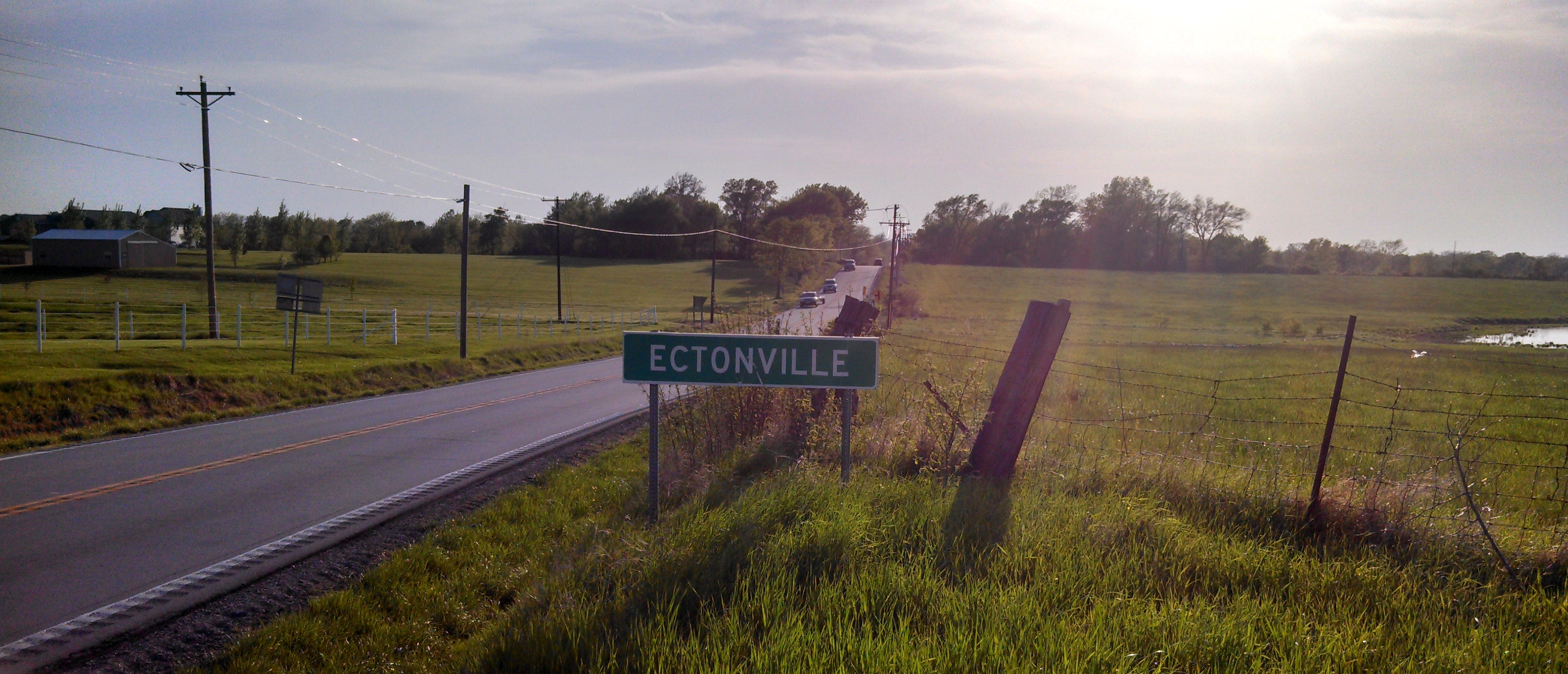
- Entrance sign to the community

- Location in the state of Missouri
- Coordinates: 39°22′04″N 94°28′41″W
- Country: United States
- State: Missouri
- County: Clay
- Elevation: 1,020 ft (310 m)
- Time zone: UTC-6 (Central (CST))
  - Summer (DST): UTC-5 (CDT)
- ZIP code: 64167
- Area code: 816
- GNIS feature ID: 717394

Ectonville is an unincorporated community in Clay County, Missouri, United States. It is part of the Kansas City metropolitan area.

The community was named after Dillie Ecton, a local merchant in the 1930s.
