= Missouri Route 1 =

State highway in Missouri, U.S.

Route 1

Route information
- Maintained by MoDOT
- Length: 7.253 mi (11.673 km)
- Existed: 1922–present

Major junctions
- South end: Route 210 in North Kansas City
- I-35 in Kansas City; US 69 in Kansas City
- North end: Route 152 in Kansas City

Location
- Country: United States
- State: Missouri
- Counties: Clay

Highway system
- Missouri State Highway System; Interstate; US; State; Supplemental
← Route 799	→ Route 2

Route 1 is a 7.253-mile-long (11.673 km) state highway in the Kansas City metropolitan area that travels from Route 210 in North Kansas City to Route 152 in Kansas City. Because of annexation, Route 1 travels to the north out of North Kansas City and enters Kansas City proper before passing through Gladstone and re-entering Kansas City.

== Route description ==
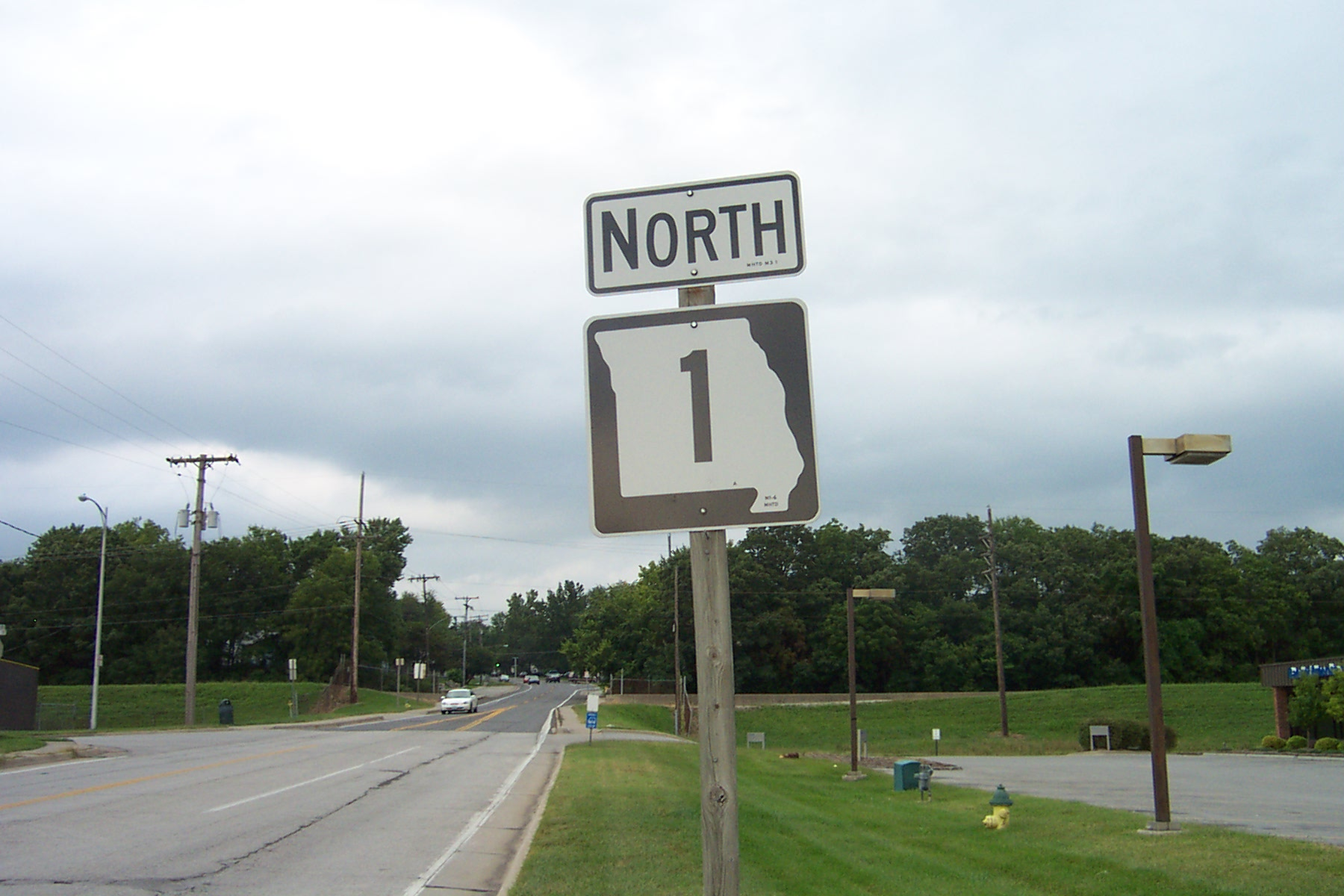
Route 1 in Kansas City

Route 1 begins at an intersection with Route 210 (Armour Road) in North Kansas City as Vernon Street. It travels to the north-northeast along Prather Road into Kansas City proper. Before crossing Parvin Road, the route curves northeast, then before passing under Interstate 35 it curves back to due north, at which point it becomes Antioch Road. Route 1 then has an interchange with Interstate 35 (I-35) and an intersection with U.S. Route 69 (US 69; Vivion Road). The route crosses Englewood Road into the city limits of Gladstone, continuing on from N.E. 64th Street as N. Prospect Avenue. It then continues due north to N.E. 72nd Street, and curves to the northeast, where it re-enters the city limits of Kansas City. Then Route 1 curves back to the north, becoming N. Indiana Avenue. The route ends at an interchange with Route 152.

== History ==
The highway was one of the original 1922 highways in Missouri, and it originally ran from the Arkansas state line south of Noel to the Iowa state line north of Rock Port. In 1926, with the creation of the U.S. Highway system, Route 1 became part of U.S. Route 71 and U.S. Route 59. The original Route 1 is now:

- U.S. Route 275 from Iowa to Rock Port
- U.S. Route 136 from Rock Port to south of Tarkio
- U.S. Route 59 from Tarkio to Savannah
- U.S. Route 71 from Savannah to Carthage (also Interstate 49 from Kansas City to Carthage)
- Interstate 49 Business from Carthage to Joplin
- Interstate 49/U.S. Route 71 from Joplin to Anderson
- Route 59 (formerly US 71) from Anderson to Arkansas.

=== Branches ===
Route 1 originally had several branches (all decommissioned):

- Route 1A to Phelps City (now U.S. Route 136)
- Route 1B to Craig
- Route 1C to Bigelow (now Route 118)
- Route 1D to north of Maitland (now Route 113)
- Route 1E to eastern Holt County (now Route 120)
- Route 1F to Forest City (now Route 111)
- Route 1F to the Kansas state line (now Route 66)

== Major intersections ==
The entire route is in Clay County.

Location	mi	km	Destinations	Notes
North Kansas City	0.000	0.000	Route 210 (Armour Road)	Southern terminus
Kansas City	2.018	3.248	I-35 – Des Moines	Diamond interchange; I-35 exit 8C
Kansas City	2.937	4.727	US 69 / Lewis and Clark Trail (Vivion Road)	
Kansas City	7.253	11.673	Route 152 – Topeka, Liberty	Northern terminus; interchange
1.000 mi = 1.609 km; 1.000 km = 0.621 mi
