= Stockdale, Missouri =

Unincorporated community in Missouri, U.S.

Coordinates: 39°17′27″N 94°20′33″W

Stockdale is an unincorporated community in Clay County, Missouri, United States. It was so named because livestock was shipped by rail from its depot.
