= Jesse Sexton =

American politician

Jesse DeWitt Sexton (September 6, 1885 – August 28, 1948) was an American Democratic politician.

== Early life ==
Born September 6, 1885 near Paradise in Clay County, Sexton was educated in the public schools of Kearney, the Central Missouri State Teachers College, and the Polytechnic Institute and the Southwestern Optical College of Kansas City. He married Miss Eva Albright on Christmas 1910.

== Professional and legislative career ==
Sexton was a farmer and teacher. He was elected as County Judge of Clinton County in 1934 and served until 1936.

Sexton was first elected to the Missouri Senate in 1936 and was re-elected in both 1940 and 1944. He was standing for re-election again in 1948 when he died.

Sexton died August 28, 1948 in hospital in Kansas City aged 62.
