= Liberty North High School =

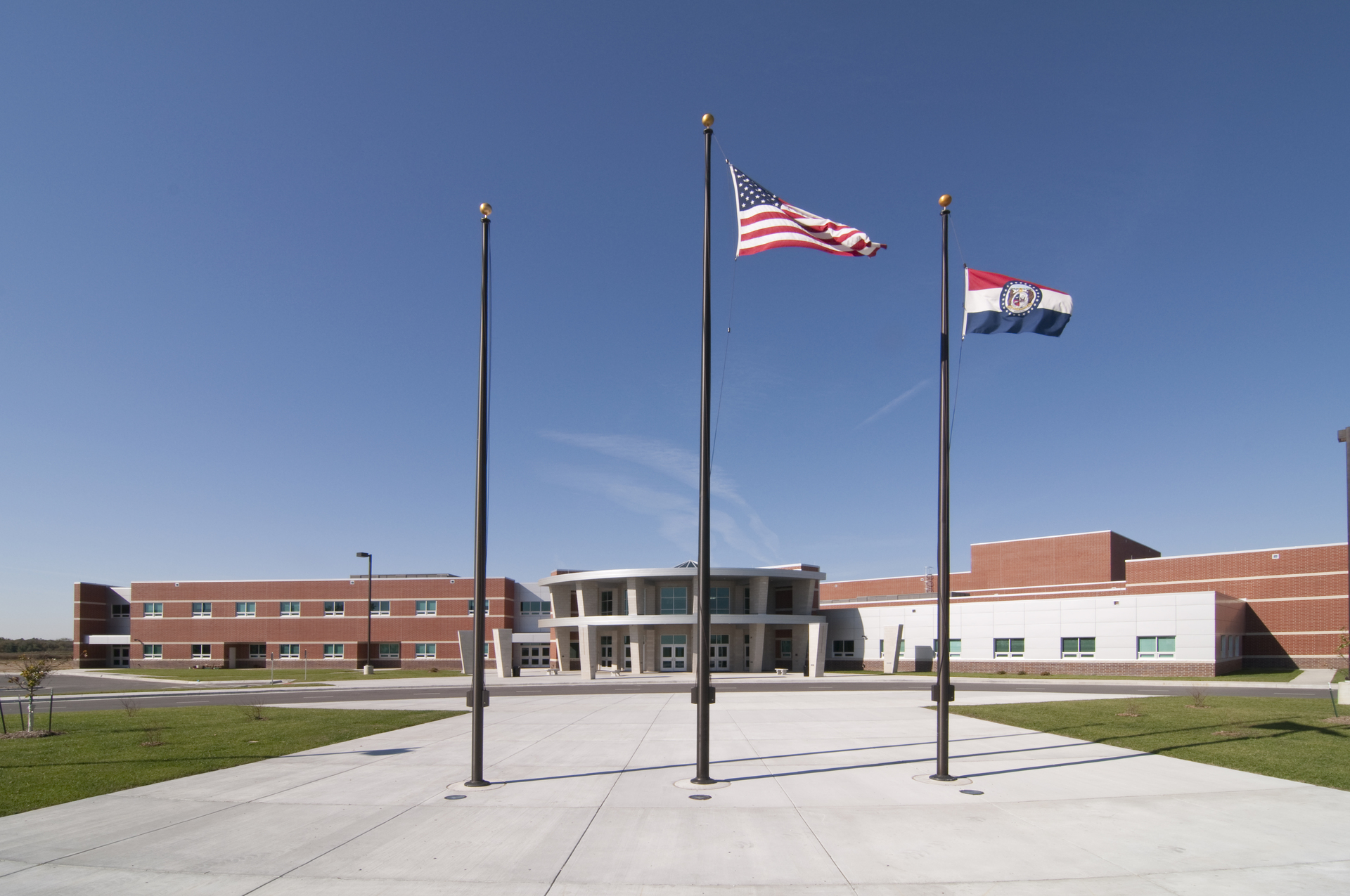

Location
- 1000 NE 104 Street; Liberty, Missouri 64068; United States; 39°17′04″N 94°25′58″W

Information
- Type: Public
- Motto: Achieving Excellence
- Established: 2010; 16 years ago
- Status: Open
- School district: Liberty Public School District
- NCES School ID: 291854003148
- Principal: Rosemary Camp
- Teaching staff: 130
- Grades: 9–12
- Gender: Co-educational
- Enrollment: 2,330 (2023–2024)
- Campus size: 1,000 acres (4,000,000 m^{2})
- Campus type: Suburban
- Colors: Navy, Gold and White
- Athletics conference: Greater Kansas City Suburban Conference
- Mascot: Eagles
- Nickname: LNHS
- Newspaper: Eagles View
- Yearbook: Ayrie
- Feeder schools: Heritage Middle School South Valley Middle School
- Website: lnhs.lps53.org

Liberty North High School (LNHS) is a four-year high school located in Liberty, Missouri, United States. As of 2021, its enrollment is over 2,000 (following a rapid increase in the 2013–14 school year, when 9th graders were placed in high schools instead of middle schools for the first time.) LNHS is one of two high schools in the Liberty Public School District, alongside Liberty High School. Liberty North High School has two feeder middle schools, South Valley Middle School and Heritage Middle School (formerly Liberty Junior High).

== History ==
LNHS was established in 2010 as Liberty Public School's second high school. Its campus is located at 104th Street and A Highway and created a new space for learning and growth for the district. As Liberty grew into a major suburb of the Kansas City Metropolitan Area, the population at Liberty High School rapidly increased and the building quickly became crowded. To accommodate the growing population, Liberty Public Schools designated LNHS as the district's second high school. A vote went before the residents of Liberty to move freshmen (9th grade students) to LHS and LNHS during the 2013–14 school year, in order to relieve crowding at the district's middle school level.

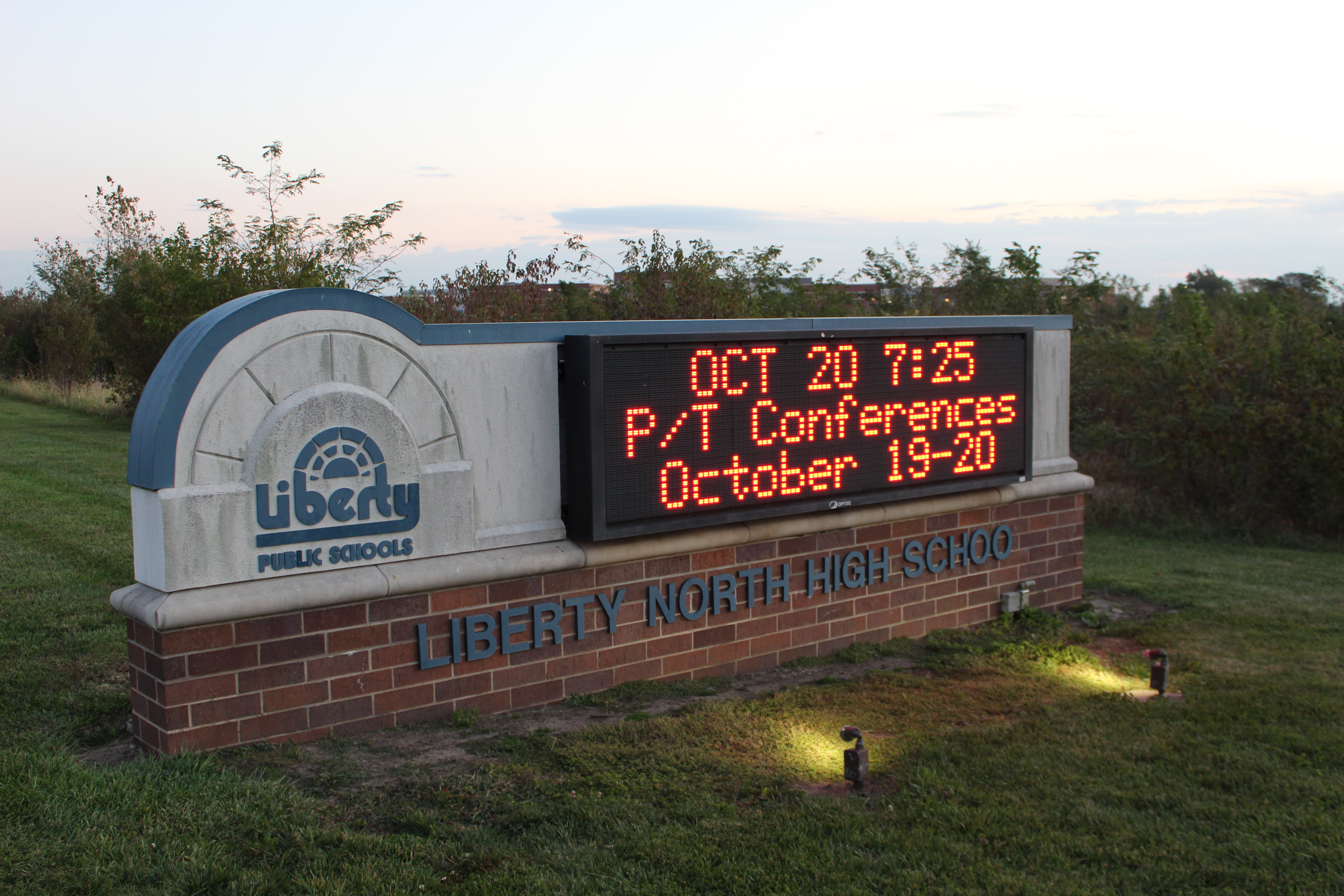
School Sign

During the 2014–15 school year, renovations to LNHS took place to add on a new section to the building. This completed over the following summer and introduced a new two-story wing to the school that contained more rooms and open-learning spaces. The new wing replaced the school's trailer classrooms, which were previously used to accommodate for the quickly expanding enrollment.

== Athletics and activities ==
The Liberty North High School mascot is the Eagle. School colors are navy, gold, and white.

Several of the school's athletic and extracurricular programs have achieved notable successes in interscholastic competitions in recent years, including, since 2011, several state championship or playoff appearances for sports teams (football, basketball, dance, rugby, and baseball). In 2023 the baseball team finished ranked 17th in the nation. The Eagles' state championships include 2014 for the Men's Track and Field team, in 2022 and 2023 for the baseball team, 2023 for the Women's Soccer Team 2023 for the football team, and several appearances by the Model UN team in national rankings. Following the 2023 campaign the Baseball team was ranked in the top 20 nationally per Perfect Game Baseball. Liberty North has produced five Gatorade Player of the Years. 2020-21: Addison Beagle (Volleyball), 2022-23: Carlie Cisneros (Volleyball), 2022-23: Tate McGuire (Baseball), 2022-23: Megan Hinnenkamp (WSoccer), 2023-24 Carlie Cisneros (Volleyball)
