= Arley (footballer) =

Brazilian footballer (born 1986)

Personal information
- Full name: Arley de Queroz Sandim
- Date of birth: May 25, 1986 (age 40)
- Place of birth: Brazil
- Height: 1.78 m (5 ft 10 in)
- Position: Forward

Senior career*
Years	Team	Apps	(Gls)
2005	Sagan Tosu	5	(0)
- * Club domestic league appearances and goals

Arley de Queroz Sandim (born May 25, 1986) is a former Brazilian football player.

== Playing career ==
He played for J2 League club Sagan Tosu in 2005 season. On August 2, he debuted in J2 League against Kyoto Purple Sanga. He played 5 matches for the club in 2005 season and he left the club end of the season.

== Club statistics ==
Club performance			League		Cup		Total	
Season	Club	League	Apps	Goals	Apps	Goals	Apps	Goals
Japan			League		Emperor's Cup		Total	
2005	Sagan Tosu	J2 League	5	0				
Country	Japan		5	0				
Total			5	0				
