= Arley, Missouri =

Unincorporated community in Missouri, U.S.

Coordinates: 39°24′16″N 94°26′43″W

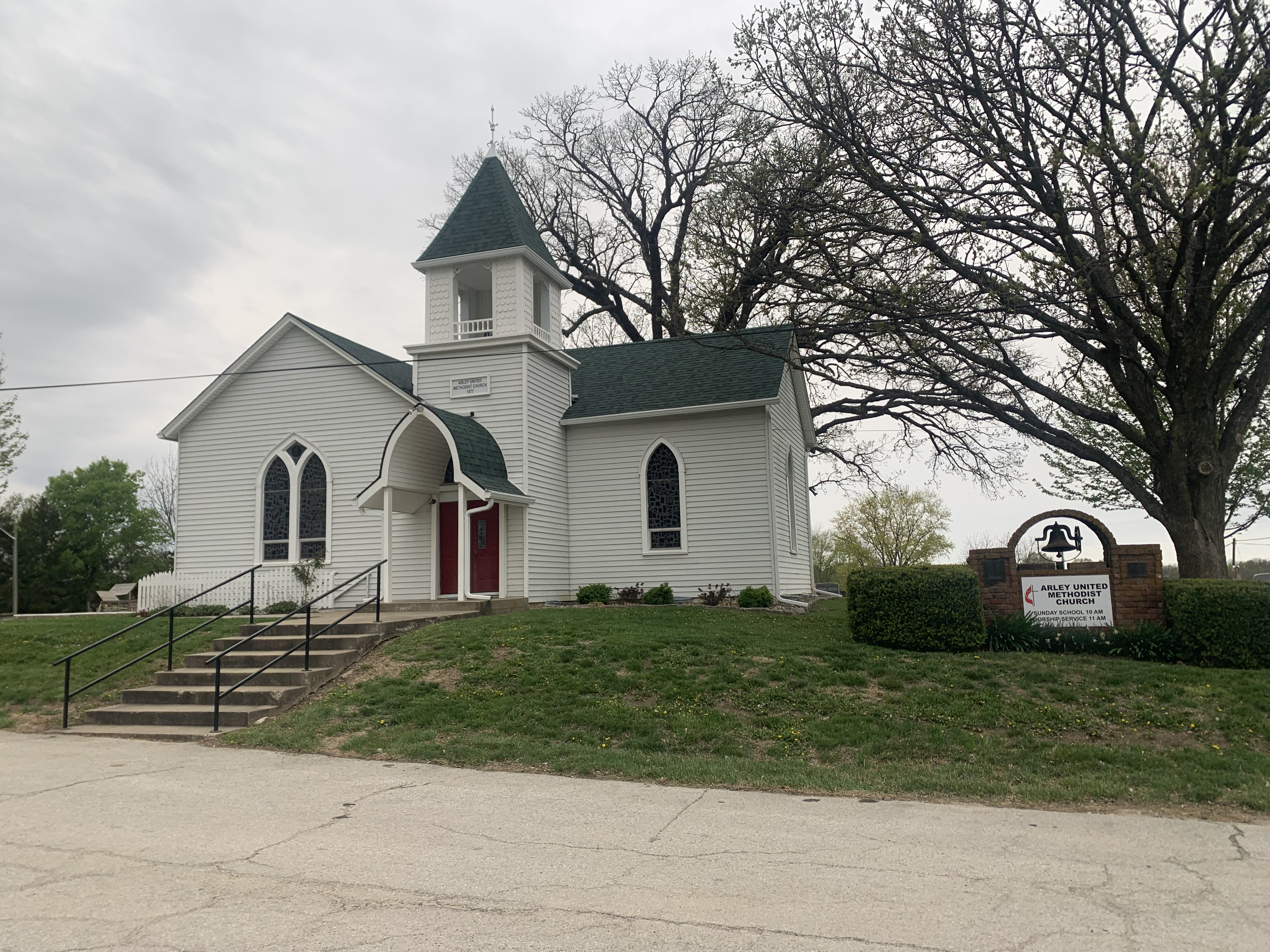
Arley United Methodist Church at Arley

Arley is an unincorporated community in Clay County, in the U.S. state of Missouri.

== History ==
A post office called Arley was established in 1893, and remained in operation until 1907. The community was named after Arley Weber, a settler's son.

The modern post office is a converted railroad tollbooth, originally constructed in 1905, which ceased operation due to the restrictions of the Wartime Prohibition Act.
