= Wheeling Corrugating Company Building =

- U.S. National Register of Historic Places
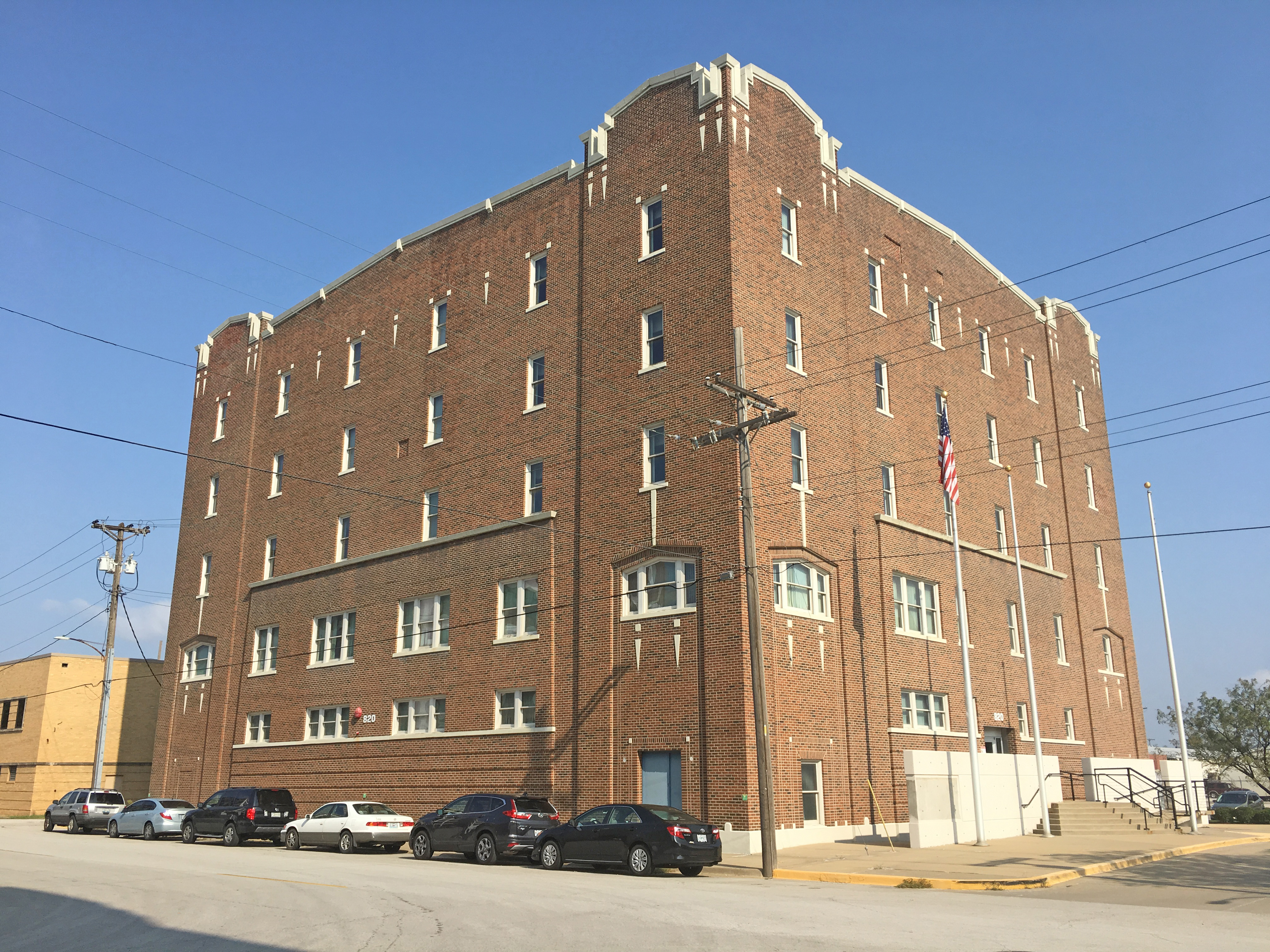

- Location within Missouri Location within the United States
- Location: 820 E. 14th Ave., North Kansas City, Missouri
- Coordinates: 39°8′4″N 94°34′14″W
- Area: less than one acre
- Built: 1920
- Architect: Tarbet & Gornall
- NRHP reference No.: 94001220
- Added to NRHP: October 21, 1994

Wheeling Corrugating Company Building, also known as Cook Composites and Polymers (CCP), is a historic factory building located at North Kansas City, Missouri. It was built in 1920, and is a five-story, six-bay, rectangular reinforced concrete building faced in brick with cut stone trim. A one-story, concrete block addition was built about 1950. It produced corrugated galvanised iron for roofing.

It was listed on the National Register of Historic Places in 1994.
