= Gashland, Kansas City =

Neighborhood of Kansas City, Missouri, U.S.

Gashland
- Neighborhood
- Interactive map of Gashland
- Coordinates: 39.258°N 94.558°W
- Country: United States
- State: Missouri
- City: Kansas City
- Post office established: 1899
- Post office closed: 1959
- Named after: Joseph D. Gash

Gashland is a neighborhood of Kansas City, Missouri, United States.

Gashland has the name of Joseph D. Gash, first landowner of the site. A post office called Gashland was established in 1899, and remained in operation until 1959.
