= Liberty High School (Liberty, Missouri) =

Location
- 200 Blue Jay Drive, Liberty, MO 64068; Liberty, Missouri; United States; 39°14′27″N 94°26′51″W

Information
- Type: Public Secondary
- Established: 1890
- School district: Liberty Public School District
- Principal: Mike Sharp
- Grades: 9–12
- Enrollment: 1,908 (2023–2024)
- Campus: Suburban
- Colors: Blue, white, and silver
- Mascot: Bluejay
- Rival: Liberty North High School
- Website: Official

Liberty High School (LHS) is a four-year high school located in Liberty, Missouri. Its 2019–2020 enrollment is approximately 2000, having rapidly increased with the addition of the freshman class for the first time during the 2013–2014 school year. LHS is one of two high schools in the Liberty Public School District, alongside Liberty North High School (Liberty, Missouri) which opened in 2010. Liberty High School has two feeder middle schools, Liberty Middle School and Discovery Middle School (formerly South Valley Junior High).

The school serves grades 9-12 and had about 1600 students in 2024.

== History ==
African Americans in Liberty were segregated at Garrison School. It is part of the Garrison School Historic District.

== Athletics/Activities ==
Several programs at Liberty have received state and national accolades. Its broadcasting program operates cable channel 18 on Time Warner Cable under the non-assigned call letters KLPS. In 2017, Liberty High School was ranked 1st in the nation in debate and forensics according to the National Speech and Debate Association with over 600 speech and forensics degrees on the team. The school has a competitive marching band known as the blue and white Vanguard. Liberty's baseball team won the state championship at the highest class level in 2002 and 2021.

== Notable alumni ==
- David Allen, American football player
- Braxton Bragg, baseball player
- Scott Carroll, baseball player
- James Dewees, musician with Reggie and the Full Effect, The Get Up Kids and My Chemical Romance
- Shea Groom, soccer player
- Charlie Lee (American football coach), former football coach for the Texas Longhorns and Denver Broncos
- Marcus Lucas, American football player
- Alex Saxon, actor
- Eric Staves, actor
- Bennett Stirtz, basketball player
- Deron Winn, UFC fighter
