= Glenaire, Missouri =

- City
- Location of Glenaire, Missouri
- Coordinates: 39°13′11″N 94°27′05″W
- Country: United States
- State: Missouri
- County: Clay

Area
  - Total: 0.27 sq mi (0.70 km^{2})
  - Land: 0.27 sq mi (0.70 km^{2})
  - Water: 0 sq mi (0.00 km^{2})
- Elevation: 797 ft (243 m)

Population (2020)
  - Total: 539
  - Density: 1,985.6/sq mi (766.64/km^{2})
- Time zone: UTC-6 (Central (CST))
  - Summer (DST): UTC-5 (CDT)
- ZIP code: 64068
- Area code: 816
- FIPS code: 29-27262
- GNIS feature ID: 2394911
- Website: www.glenairemo.org

Glenaire is a city in Clay County, Missouri, United States. The population was 539 at the 2020 census. The city is completely surrounded by the city of Liberty. It was originally referred to as "Interurban Heights" or "Belleview" because of the interurban train that ran through the area and stopped at the Belleview depot near the Belleview Dairy. It is part of the Kansas City metropolitan area.

== History ==
Glenaire was originally the location of a resort in between the cities of Liberty and Claycomo. The resort was called Urban Lake and was home to a 14-acre (57,000 m^{2}) lake that was open for recreational activities. In 1958, Glenaire was incorporated as a city.

== Geography ==
According to the United States Census Bureau, the city has a total area of 0.27 square miles (0.70 km^{2}), consisting entirely of land.

== Demographics ==
Historical population
Census	Pop.	Note	%±
1960	341		—
1970	505		48.1%
1980	541		7.1%
1990	597		10.4%
2000	553		−7.4%
2010	545		−1.4%
2020	539		−1.1%
U.S. Decennial Census

=== Racial and ethnic composition ===
Glenaire city, Missouri – Racial and ethnic composition Note: the US Census treats Hispanic/Latino as an ethnic category. This table excludes Latinos from the racial categories and assigns them to a separate category. Hispanics/Latinos may be of any race.
Race / Ethnicity (NH = Non-Hispanic)	Pop 2000	Pop 2010	Pop 2020	% 2000	% 2010	% 2020
White alone (NH)	531	520	476	96.02%	95.41%	88.31%
Black or African American alone (NH)	0	2	6	0.00%	0.37%	1.11%
Native American or Alaska Native alone (NH)	2	2	2	0.36%	0.37%	0.37%
Asian alone (NH)	2	5	6	0.36%	0.92%	1.11%
Native Hawaiian or Pacific Islander alone (NH)	1	0	0	0.18%	0.00%	0.00%
Other race alone (NH)	0	2	4	0.00%	0.37%	0.74%
Mixed race or Multiracial (NH)	11	6	29	1.99%	1.10%	5.38%
Hispanic or Latino (any race)	6	8	16	1.08%	1.47%	2.97%
Total	553	545	539	100.00%	100.00%	100.00%

=== 2020 census ===
As of the 2020 census, there were 539 people, 255 households, and 153 families living in the city.

=== 2010 census ===
As of the census of 2010, there were 545 people, 220 households, and 166 families living in the city. The population density was 2,018.5 inhabitants per square mile (779.3/km^{2}). There were 231 housing units at an average density of 855.6 per square mile (330.3/km^{2}). The racial makeup of the city was 96.7% White, 0.4% African American, 0.4% Native American, 0.9% Asian, 0.4% from other races, and 1.3% from two or more races. Hispanic or Latino of any race were 1.5% of the population.

There were 220 households, of which 31.4% had children under the age of 18 living with them, 60.5% were married couples living together, 9.1% had a female householder with no husband present, 5.9% had a male householder with no wife present, and 24.5% were non-families. 21.8% of all households were made up of individuals, and 8.2% had someone living alone who was 65 years of age or older. The average household size was 2.48 and the average family size was 2.86.

The median age in the city was 42.5 years. 22% of residents were under the age of 18; 5.8% were between the ages of 18 and 24; 24.5% were from 25 to 44; 31.2% were from 45 to 64; and 16.5% were 65 years of age or older. The gender makeup of the city was 47.2% male and 52.8% female.

=== 2000 census ===
As of the census of 2000, there were 553 people, 219 households, and 174 families living in the city. The population density was 1,861.8 inhabitants per square mile (718.8/km^{2}). There were 226 housing units at an average density of 760.9 per square mile (293.8/km^{2}). The racial makeup of the city was 96.38% White, 0.36% Native American, 0.36% Asian, 0.18% Pacific Islander, 0.72% from other races, and 1.99% from two or more races. Hispanic or Latino of any race were 1.08% of the population.

There were 219 households, out of which 32.4% had children under the age of 18 living with them, 68.5% were married couples living together, 7.3% had a female householder with no husband present, and 20.5% were non-families. 16.9% of all households were made up of individuals, and 5.5% had someone living alone who was 65 years of age or older. The average household size was 2.53 and the average family size was 2.84.

In the city the population was spread out, with 23.0% under the age of 18, 5.1% from 18 to 24, 27.8% from 25 to 44, 30.2% from 45 to 64, and 13.9% who were 65 years of age or older. The median age was 42 years. For every 100 females, there were 101.1 males. For every 100 females age 18 and over, there were 94.5 males.

The median income for a household in the city was $54,327, and the median income for a family was $56,000. Males had a median income of $38,472 versus $26,979 for females. The per capita income for the city was $21,133. About 4.7% of families and 3.8% of the population were below the poverty line, including 6.7% of those under age 18 and 2.3% of those age 65 or over.

== Education ==
It is in the Liberty 53 School District.
