= North Kansas City, Missouri =

City in Clay County, Missouri, United States

- City
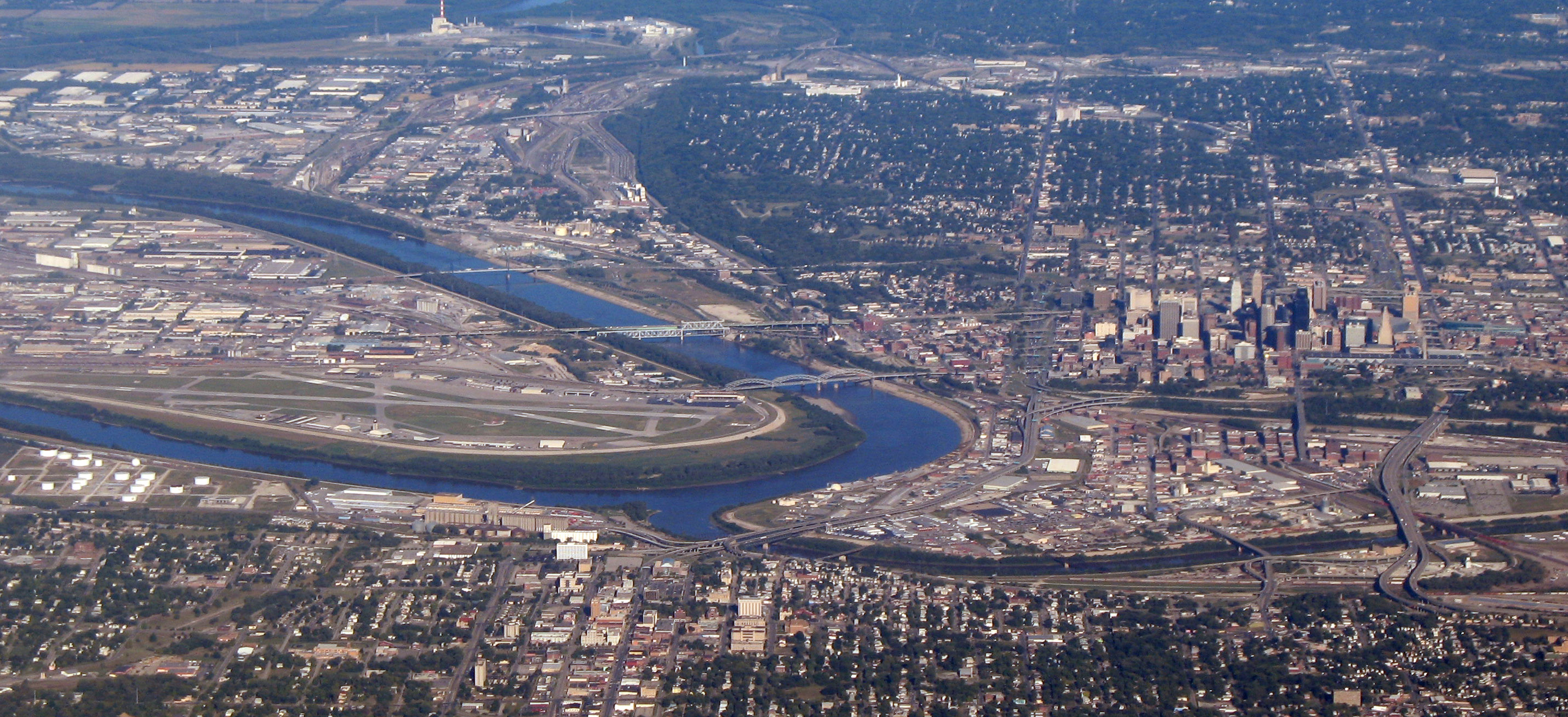
- North Kansas City is depicted in the area on the left of the bend in the Missouri River.

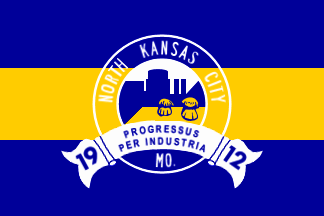
- Flag
- Nicknames: Northtown, NKC
- Motto: Virtually Urban, Supremely Suburban
- Location of North Kansas City, Missouri

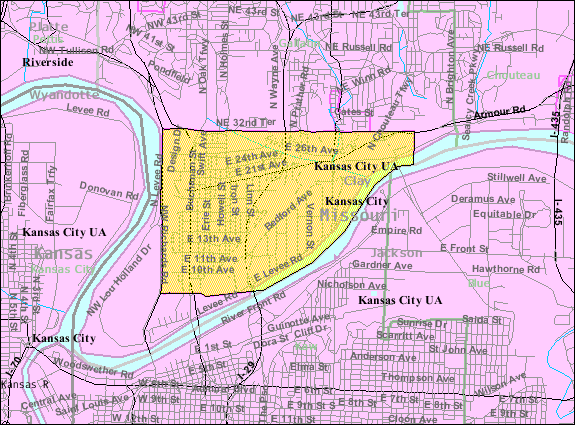
- U.S. Census map
- Coordinates: 39°08′22.58″N 94°33′50.97″W
- Country: United States
- State: Missouri
- County: Clay
- Incorporated: November 4, 1912

Government
  - Mayor: Jesse Smith
  - City manager: Michael Nichols
  - Councilmembers: Ward 1: Anthony Saper & Kristen Click; Ward 2: Lyndsey Magrone & Tom Bailey; Ward 3: Linda Alvarez & Dylan Cain; Ward 4: Synthia Larson & Michael Wells

Area
  - Total: 4.610 sq mi (11.940 km^{2})
  - Land: 4.373 sq mi (11.325 km^{2})
  - Water: 0.237 sq mi (0.614 km^{2})
- Elevation: 745 ft (227 m)

Population (2020)
  - Total: 4,467
  - Estimate (2023): 5,534
  - Density: 1,265.8/sq mi (488.71/km^{2})
- Time zone: UTC−6 (Central (CST))
  - Summer (DST): UTC−5 (CDT)
- ZIP Code: 64116
- Area codes: 816 and 975
- FIPS code: 29-53102
- GNIS feature ID: 2395255
- Website: nkc.org

North Kansas City is a city in Clay County, Missouri, United States. It is also enclaved in Kansas City. Even though the name is similar to its larger counterpart, Kansas City, it is an independent municipality and part of the Kansas City metropolitan area. The population was 4,467 at the 2020 census. Originally a northern suburb across the Missouri River from Kansas City, it is now almost completely surrounded by Kansas City, which has annexed far to the north of North Kansas City's northern city limits. North Kansas City also adjoins the small municipality of Avondale.

== History ==
A post office called North Kansas City was established in 1891. The town lies north of Kansas City, hence the name.

Large scale development of the area was not possible before the construction of levees protecting North Kansas City from flooding from the Missouri River. The levee on the north bank of the Missouri River was constructed between 1909 and 1912 and is owned and maintained by the North Kansas City Levee District. The city is also protected by a hillside levee.

The city was incorporated on November 4, 1912. A five-member board of trustees was elected in 1914 to oversee municipal affairs. One of the original trustees was William E. Macken, who was elected as the first mayor of North Kansas City in 1924. The city's largest park, Macken Park, is named for him.

The Armour Theatre Building, Sears, Roebuck and Company Warehouse Building, and Wheeling Corrugating Company Building are listed on the National Register of Historic Places.

In 2012, North Kansas City celebrated its centennial with a citywide celebration. Since 2010, the city has seen the openings of two micro breweries, a distillery and a pickleball facility. The new businesses were fueled by the repopulation of downtown Kansas City, just across the Missouri River.

== Geography ==
North Kansas City is located at 39°08′22.58″N 94°33′50.97″W (39.1396064, -94.5641570).

According to the United States Census Bureau, the city has a total area of 4.610 square miles (11.94 km^{2}), of which, 4.373 square miles (11.33 km^{2}) is land and 0.237 square miles (0.61 km^{2}) (66.61%) is water.

== Transportation ==
Highways connecting North Kansas City with the surrounding area are Interstate 29/35/US 71, Missouri Route 1 (Vernon Street), Route 9 (Burlington Street), Route 210 (Armour Road), Route 269 (Chouteau Trafficway), and Route 283 (North Oak Trafficway). The US 169 (Broadway Extension) freeway runs immediately to the west of North Kansas City's city limits.

Four highway bridges connect North Kansas City with the portion of Kansas City, Missouri south of the Missouri River. They are the Buck O'Neil Bridge on US 169, Heart of America Bridge on Route 9, the Bond Bridge on I-29/35/US 71, and the Chouteau Bridge on Route 269. A fifth bridge to the west of the Heart of America Bridge, the ASB Bridge, originally carried road and rail traffic, but is now only a rail bridge. A dedicated bicycle/pedestrian path on the Heart of America Bridge opened in October 2010.

== Demographics ==
Historical population
Census	Pop.	Note	%±
1920	870		—
1930	2,574		195.9%
1940	2,688		4.4%
1950	3,886		44.6%
1960	5,657		45.6%
1970	5,183		−8.4%
1980	4,507		−13.0%
1990	4,130		−8.4%
2000	4,714		14.1%
2010	4,208		−10.7%
2020	4,467		6.2%
2023 (est.)	5,534		23.9%
U.S. Decennial Census; 2020 Census

As of the 2023 American Community Survey, there are 2,891 estimated households in North Kansas City with an average of 1.65 persons per household. The city has a median household income of $46,024. Approximately 9.7% of the city's population lives at or below the poverty line. North Kansas City has an estimated 71.4% employment rate, with 31.6% of the population holding a bachelor's degree or higher and 93.0% holding a high school diploma.

The top five reported ancestries (people were allowed to report up to two ancestries, thus the figures will generally add to more than 100%) were English (98.3%), Spanish (0.0%), Indo-European (0.8%), Asian and Pacific Islander (0.8%), and Other (0.0%).

The median age in the city was 47.1 years.

=== Racial and ethnic composition ===
North Kansas City, Missouri – racial and ethnic composition Note: the US Census treats Hispanic/Latino as an ethnic category. This table excludes Latinos from the racial categories and assigns them to a separate category. Hispanics/Latinos may be of any race.
Race / ethnicity (NH = non-Hispanic)	Pop. 2000	Pop. 2010	Pop 2020	% 2000	% 2010	% 2020
White alone (NH)	3,673	3,007	3,048	77.92%	71.46%	68.23%
Black or African American alone (NH)	185	442	563	3.92%	10.50%	12.60%
Native American or Alaska Native alone (NH)	26	21	15	0.55%	0.50%	0.34%
Asian alone (NH)	200	139	120	4.24%	3.30%	2.69%
Native Hawaiian or Pacific Islander alone (NH)	11	12	43	0.23%	0.29%	0.96%
Other race alone (NH)	14	4	18	0.30%	0.10%	0.40%
Mixed race or multiracial (NH)	207	98	207	4.39%	2.33%	4.63%
Hispanic or Latino (any race)	398	485	453	8.44%	11.53%	10.14%
Total	4,714	4,208	4,467	100.00%	100.00%	100.00%

=== 2020 census ===
As of the 2020 census, there were 4,467 people, 2,564 households, and 921 families residing in the city. The population density was 1,021.5 inhabitants per square mile (394.4/km^{2}), and there were 2,722 housing units at an average density of 622.5 per square mile (240.3/km^{2}).

The median age was 40.1 years. 0.7% of residents were under the age of 5, 13.3% were under the age of 18, and 20.5% were 65 years of age or older. The gender makeup was 49.7% male and 50.3% female. For every 100 females, there were 91.8 males, and for every 100 females age 18 and over, there were 88.6 males age 18 and over.

Of all households, 14.7% had children under the age of 18, 22.6% were married-couple households, 28.9% were households with a male householder and no spouse or partner present, and 39.7% were households with a female householder and no spouse or partner present. About 53.0% of all households were made up of individuals, and 20.0% had someone living alone who was 65 years of age or older.

100.0% of residents lived in urban areas, while 0.0% lived in rural areas.

There were 2,722 housing units, of which 5.8% were vacant. The homeowner vacancy rate was 0.3% and the rental vacancy rate was 5.2%.

=== 2010 census ===
As of the 2010 census, there were 4,208 people, 2,361 households, and 878 families residing in the city. The population density was 957.9 inhabitants per square mile (369.8/km^{2}). There were 2,565 housing units at an average density of 584.3 per square mile (225.6/km^{2}). The racial makeup of the city was 76.76% White, 10.74% African American, 0.76% Native American, 3.33% Asian, 0.29% Pacific Islander, 4.66% from some other races and 3.47% from two or more races. Hispanic or Latino people of any race were 11.53% of the population.

There were 2,361 households, of which 17.4% had children under the age of 18 living with them, 21.7% were married couples living together, 11.2% had a female householder with no husband present, 4.3% had a male householder with no wife present, and 62.8% were non-families. 53.2% of all households were made up of individuals, and 15.4% had someone living alone who was 65 years of age or older. The average household size was 1.78 and the average family size was 2.68.

The median age in the city was 39.9 years. 15.8% of residents were under the age of 18; 9.5% were between the ages of 18 and 24; 31% were from 25 to 44; 26.9% were from 45 to 64; and 16.7% were 65 years of age or older. The gender makeup of the city was 48.8% male and 51.2% female.

=== 2000 census ===
As of the 2000 census, there were 4,714 people, 2,546 households, and 1,013 families residing in the city. The population density was 1,080.0 inhabitants per square mile (417.0/km^{2}). There were 2,779 housing units at an average density of 636.7 per square mile (245.8/km^{2}). The racial makeup of the city was 82.48% White, 3.97% African American, 0.59% Native American, 4.29% Asian, 0.23% Pacific Islander, 3.31% from some other races and 5.13% from two or more races. Hispanic or Latino people of any race were 8.44% of the population.

There were 2,546 households, out of which 18.1% had children under the age of 18 living with them, 24.7% were married couples living together, 11.0% had a female householder with no husband present, and 60.2% were non-families. 51.1% of all households were made up of individuals, and 12.9% had someone living alone who was 65 years of age or older. The average household size was 1.85 and the average family size was 2.77.

In the city the population was spread out, with 18.0% under the age of 18, 12.7% from 18 to 24, 34.3% from 25 to 44, 20.9% from 45 to 64, and 14.1% who were 65 years of age or older. The median age was 36 years. For every 100 females, there were 94.1 males. For every 100 females age 18 and over, there were 92.2 males.

The median income for a household in the city was $28,674, and the median income for a family was $33,906. Males had a median income of $27,487 versus $26,591 for females. The per capita income for the city was $18,967. About 10.6% of families and 12.5% of the population were below the poverty line, including 21.7% of those under age 18 and 5.9% of those age 65 or over.

== Municipal government ==
North Kansas City has a Mayor/Council/City Administrator form of government. Two council members are elected to two-year terms from each of the four wards. The mayor serves a four-year term. The current mayor, Jesse Smith beat former mayor Bryant DeLong in the April 8, 2025, election.

Steve Fuller currently sits as Judge.

=== City services ===
The Fire Department has approximately 65 FIRE/EMS personnel occupying two stations. The police department has 41 sworn police officers and approximately 10 civilian personnel. North Kansas City has its own hospital, library and park system. Macken Park is an approximate 60-acre (240,000 m^{2}) park with a walking trail, running track, picnic shelters, playgrounds, lighted tennis and handball courts, baseball fields, soccer fields and basketball courts. Dagg Park, located east of City Hall features picnic tables, children's playground, spray park, and fountain. The North Kansas City Parks and Recreation Department offers an extensive list of programs and activities year-round. The city cooperates with local merchants in providing area residents and workers with entertainment events like Northtown's Noontime Friday in the Park concerts, parades and special displays.

== Education ==
=== Primary and secondary schools ===
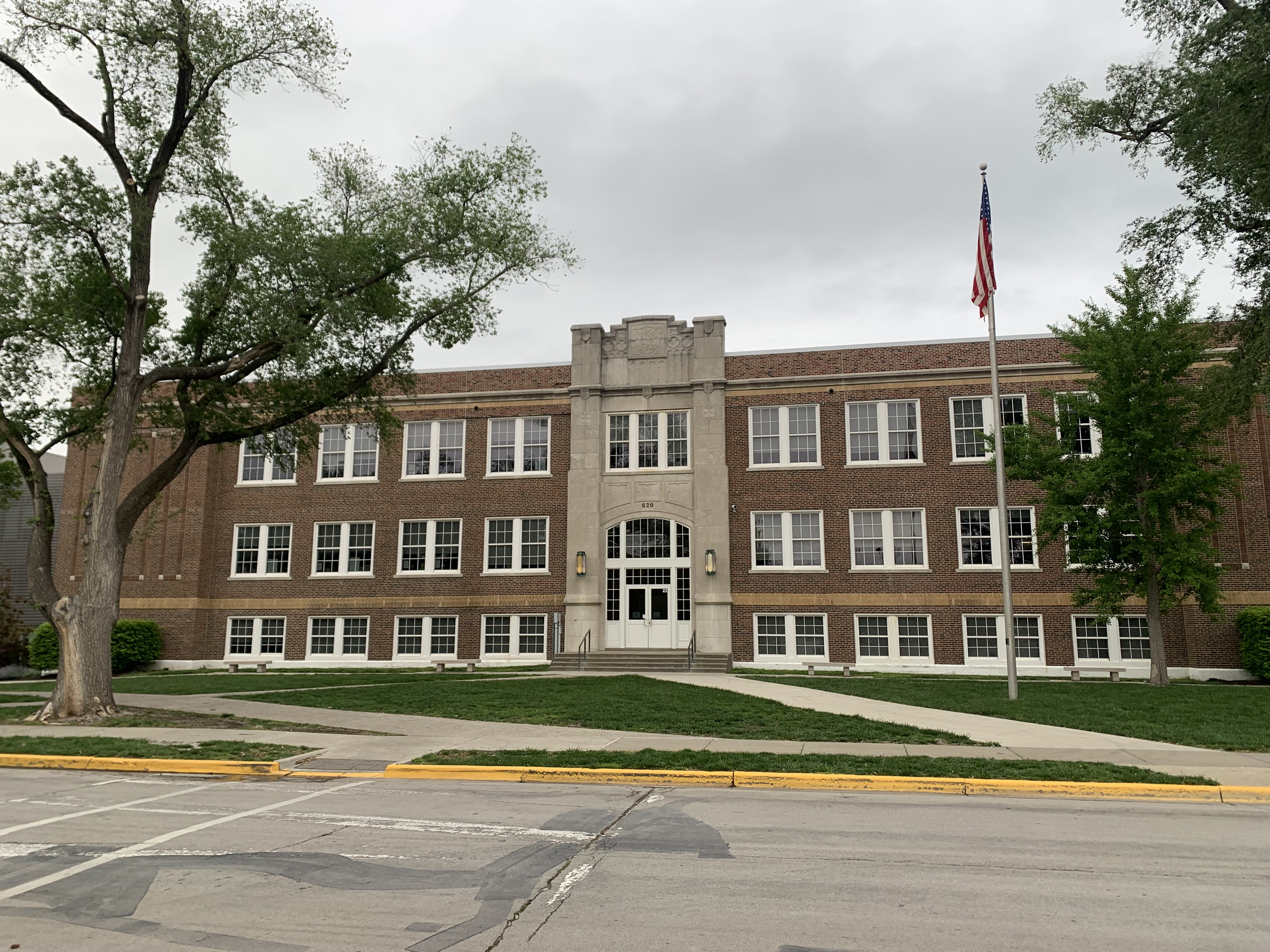
North Kansas City High School

North Kansas City School District is the area school district. Most of the residentially-zoned areas of North Kansas City are zoned to Briarcliff Elementary School, while portions are zoned to Crestview Elementary School. All portions of NKC are zoned to Northgate Middle School and North Kansas City High School.

=== Tertiary education and libraries ===
Metropolitan Community College has the North Kansas City school district in its taxation area.

North Kansas City Library, located at the southeast corner of 23rd and Howell, offers loans of books, magazines, video tapes, DVDs, and compact discs. The library is run by the city and is not a part of the Kansas City Public Library or the Mid-Continent Public Library systems.

== Healthcare ==
North Kansas City Hospital, founded in 1958, is a primary acute care center with 451 beds.

== Infrastructure ==
liNKCity is one of the first municipally operated broadband networks in the state and provides up to 1 gigabit per second. For all residential citizens, it is free of cost and starts at 100 megabits per second. In 2005, the City of North Kansas City began construction of its own fiber optic network, and service began in 2006. In 2014, the city entered into an agreement for liNKCity to be managed by a third-party provider, DataShack.

== Notable people ==
- Dan Lanning (b. 1986), head football coach for the Oregon Ducks

== See also ==
- List of cities in Missouri
