= Roosterville, Missouri =

Unincorporated settlement in Missouri, U.S.

Coordinates: 39°17′43″N 94°26′12″W

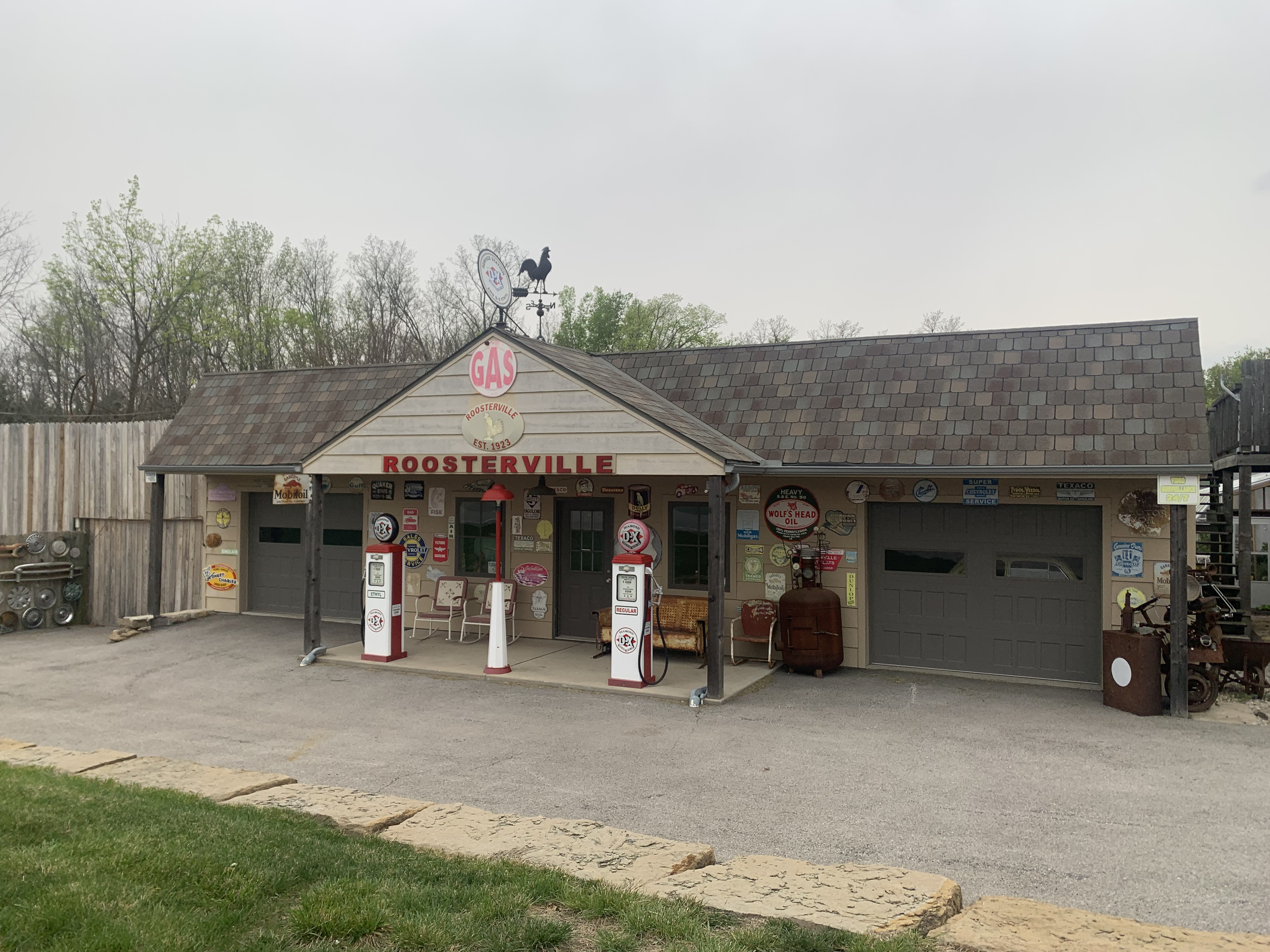
Old Roosterville Gas Station at Roosterville, Missouri

Roosterville is an unincorporated settlement located to the north of the city of Liberty in Clay County, Missouri. Roosterville has an airport.
