= Liberty Public School District =

School district in Missouri, U.S.

Liberty Public Schools
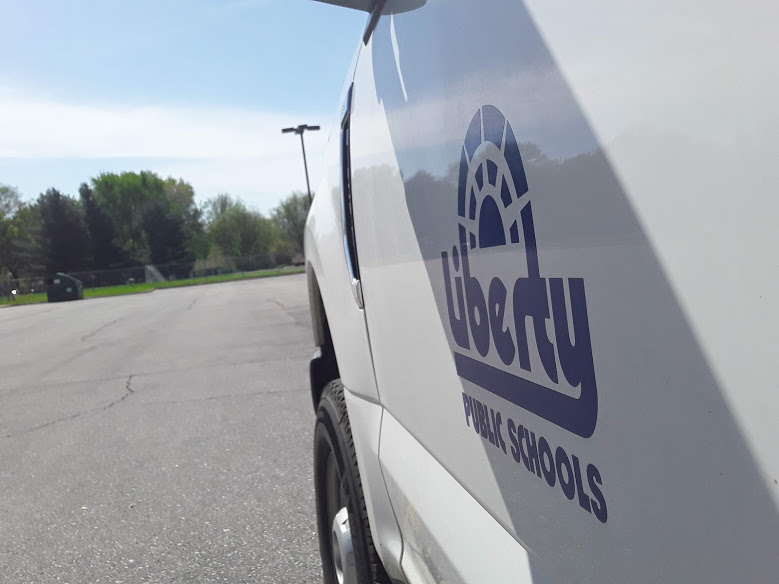

Address
- 8 Victory Lane Liberty, Clay, Missouri, 64068; United States

District information
- Type: Public
- Motto: Empowering Excellence
- Superintendent: Jeremy Tucker
- School board: Liberty
- Budget: Total: $215.1 Million Operating: $149.7 Million
- NCES District ID: 2918540

Students and staff
- Enrollment: 12,632 (2020-2021)
- Faculty: 783
- Student–teacher ratio: 14.80

Other information
- Website: www.lps53.org

Liberty Public Schools (Sometimes referred to as Liberty 53 or LPS) is a public school district in Liberty, Missouri, United States. It encompasses almost 85 square miles with more than 12,000 students' grades Preschool through 12th in attendance.

LPS was recognized as a high performing school district for all 12 years the State of Missouri presented the Distinction in Performance Award, making it one of only 6% of Missouri districts to be placed in this category. The district is one of the fastest growing school districts in the state of Missouri, with much of its growth occurring in the last 12 years.

The district includes Liberty, Glenaire, and portions of Mosby and North Kansas City.

== Liberty Board of Education ==
The Liberty Board of Education is a body of members elected by the voters of Liberty Missouri. The purpose of the board is to supervise the day-to-day operations of the school district, and to ensure that the district is upheld to state statues and the rules and regulations of the Missouri State School Board and the Missouri Department of Education (DESE).

Board of Education meetings are held on the first Tuesday at 7:00 a.m. and third Tuesday of each month at 7:00 p.m. at the Liberty School District Administration Center.

== Liberty Education Foundation ==
Grants to the school district are provided through the Foundation.

== Broadcast Stations ==
Liberty Public Schools has a broadcast station solely for district use that is broadcast throughout the City of Liberty. They have a partnership with Spectrum Cable to broadcast the channel on Channel 18 to Spectrum customers.

== Schools ==
=== High Schools (9-12) ===
- Liberty High School (LHS)
- Liberty North High School (LNHS)

=== Alternative High Schools (9-12) ===
- Liberty Academy

=== Middle Schools (6-8) ===
- Discovery Middle School (Formerly South Valley Junior High, an 8th and 9th grade school) (DMS)
- Heritage Middle School (Formerly Liberty Junior High, an 8th and 9th grade school) (HMS)
- Liberty Middle School (Formerly a 6th and 7th grade school feeding into South Valley Junior High) (LMS)
- South Valley Middle School (Formerly a 6th and 7th grade school feeding into Liberty Junior High) (SVMS)

=== Elementary Schools (K-5) ===
- Alexander Doniphan Elementary
- EPiC Elementary
- Franklin Elementary
- Kellybrook Elementary
- Lewis and Clark Elementary
- Liberty Oaks Elementary
- Lillian Schumacher Elementary
- Manor Hill Elementary
- Ridgeview Elementary
- Shoal Creek Elementary
- Warren Hills Elementary

=== Preschools ===
- Early Childhood Center (ECC Or LECC)
