= National Register of Historic Places listings in Clay County, Missouri =

Location of Clay County in Missouri

This is a list of the National Register of Historic Places listings in Clay County, Missouri.

This is intended to be a complete list of the properties and districts on the National Register of Historic Places in Clay County, Missouri, United States. Latitude and longitude coordinates are provided for many National Register properties and districts; these locations may be seen together in a map.

There are 39 properties and districts listed on the National Register in the county, including 1 National Historic Landmark.

This National Park Service list is complete through NPS recent listings posted March 14, 2025.

== Current listings ==
	Name on the Register	Image	Date listed	Location	City or town	Description
1	Aker Cemetery	Aker Cemetery	November 13, 1974 (#74001071)	Northeast of Smithville off MO W 39°24′40″N 94°32′44″W	Smithville	
2	Antioch Christian Church	Antioch Christian Church	April 2, 1979 (#79001358)	4805 NE Antioch Rd. 39°10′53″N 94°32′52″W	Kansas City	
3	Armour Theatre Building	Armour Theatre Building	June 24, 2008 (#08000560)	400-410 Armour Rd. 39°08′33″N 94°34′32″W	North Kansas City	
4	Arthur-Leonard Historic District	Arthur-Leonard Historic District	January 4, 2001 (#00001608)	Roughly bounded by Ford Ave., Jewell St., Choctaw St., and Missouri St. 39°14′41″N 94°24′56″W	Liberty	
5	Atkins-Johnson Farmhouse Property	Atkins-Johnson Farmhouse Property	November 7, 2007 (#07001154)	6508 N Jackson Ave. 39°12′46″N 94°31′49″W	Gladstone	
6	Boarding House District		August 24, 2018 (#100002791)	401-608 Benton, 339-436 E Broadway, 201-223 S Francis, 105 Haynes, 309-526 Isley, 101 Linden, 110-112 Perry, 103-305 Saratoga, 000-213 Temple; 39°20′28″N 94°13′04″W	Excelsior Springs	
7	Clay County Savings Association Building	Clay County Savings Association Building	December 28, 1992 (#92001675)	104 E. Franklin St. 39°14′50″N 94°25′08″W	Liberty	
8	Claybrook House	Claybrook House	December 21, 1981 (#81000332)	Northeast of Kearney; 39°23′17″N 94°20′09″W	Kearney	
9	Clinton House	Clinton House	November 22, 1978 (#78001641)	404 S. Leonard St. 39°14′23″N 94°25′00″W	Liberty	
10	Colonial Hotel	Colonial Hotel	June 24, 2010 (#10000392)	328 E. Broadway; 39°20′33″N 94°13′13″W	Excelsior Springs	
11	Dr. James Compton House	Dr. James Compton House	July 10, 1979 (#79003677)	5410 NE Oak Ridge Rd. 39°11′47″N 94°30′43″W	Kansas City	
12	Dougherty-Prospect Heights Historic District	Dougherty-Prospect Heights Historic District	January 4, 2001 (#00001605)	Roughly bounded by Mississippi St., Gallatin St., Schrader St., and Fairview Ave. 39°14′52″N 94°25′32″W	Liberty	
13	Downtown Smithville Historic District	Downtown Smithville Historic District	April 21, 2014 (#14000159)	Roughly bounded by Bridge, Church, Commercial & Meadow Sts. 39°23′14″N 94°34′49″W	Smithville	
14	The Elms Historic District	The Elms Historic District	March 31, 2014 (#14000091)	Roughly 400 blk. Regent Ave., 500 blk. Elms Blvd., 500-600 blocks Kansas City Ave. 39°20′15″N 94°13′34″W	Excelsior Springs	
15	Elms Hotel	Elms Hotel	March 29, 1985 (#85000648)	Regent and Elms Blvd. 39°20′14″N 94°13′32″W	Excelsior Springs	
16	Excelsior Springs Hall of Waters Commercial East Historic District	Excelsior Springs Hall of Waters Commercial East Historic District	May 27, 1999 (#99000638)	Roughly along portions of East and West Broadway and Main St. 39°20′39″N 94°13′19″W	Excelsior Springs	
17	Excelsior Springs Hall of Waters Commercial West Historic District	Excelsior Springs Hall of Waters Commercial West Historic District	May 27, 1999 (#99000637)	Roughly along portions of Thompson, and St. Louis Aves.; South, Main, Marietta, and Spring Sts.; and Elms Blvd. 39°20′33″N 94°14′13″W	Excelsior Springs	
18	First Methodist Church	First Methodist Church	October 28, 2009 (#09000856)	114 N. Marietta St. 39°20′34″N 94°13′28″W	Excelsior Springs	
19	Garrison School Historic District	Garrison School Historic District	January 4, 2001 (#00001607)	Roughly along N. Main St. and N. Water St. 39°15′14″N 94°25′14″W	Liberty	
20	Hall of Waters	Hall of Waters	June 9, 1983 (#83000977)	201 E. Broadway; 39°20′30″N 94°13′20″W	Excelsior Springs	
21	Frank Hughes Memorial Library	Frank Hughes Memorial Library	December 28, 1992 (#92001676)	210 E. Franklin St. 39°14′50″N 94°25′03″W	Liberty	
22	IOOF Liberty Lodge No. 49	IOOF Liberty Lodge No. 49	December 28, 1992 (#92001677)	16-18 E. Franklin St. 39°14′49″N 94°25′11″W	Liberty	
23	James Brothers' House and Farm	James Brothers' House and Farm	March 16, 1972 (#72000709)	2.25 miles (3.62 km) east of Kearney; also northeast of Kearney; 39°23′36″N 94°19′18″W	Kearney	Northeast of Kearney represents a boundary increase of September 27, 1978
24	Jewell Hall	Jewell Hall	September 6, 1978 (#78001642)	Jewell St. between Kansas and Mississippi Sts. 39°14′49″N 94°24′44″W	Liberty	
25	Jewell-Lightburne Historic District	Jewell-Lightburne Historic District	January 4, 2001 (#00001606)	Roughly bounded by N. Jewell St., E. Mill St., Main St. and Gordon St. 39°14′53″N 94°24′54″W	Liberty	
26	Ligon Apartments	Ligon Apartments	May 17, 2010 (#10000265)	211 E Excelsior St. 39°20′34″N 94°13′18″W	Excelsior Springs	
27	Major Hotel	Major Hotel	December 28, 1992 (#92001678)	112 E. Franklin St. 39°14′50″N 94°25′06″W	Liberty	
28	Miller Building	Miller Building	December 28, 1992 (#92001679)	2 E. Franklin St. 39°14′50″N 94°25′12″W	Liberty	
29	Missouri City Savings Bank Building and Meeting Hall	Missouri City Savings Bank Building and Meeting Hall	July 30, 2010 (#10000507)	417-419 Main St. 39°14′18″N 94°17′39″W	Missouri City	
30	Mt. Memorial Cemetery	Mt. Memorial Cemetery	April 24, 2012 (#12000231)	500 block E. Mississippi St. 39°14′56″N 94°24′45″W	Liberty	
31	Nebo Hill Archeological Site		March 4, 1971 (#71000465)	Summit of Nebo Hill; 39°12′40″N 94°21′22″W	Liberty	
32	Odd Fellows Home District	Odd Fellows Home District	September 15, 1987 (#87001595)	MO 291; 39°13′47″N 94°24′30″W	Liberty	
33	Sears, Roebuck and Company Warehouse Building	Sears, Roebuck and Company Warehouse Building	May 9, 1997 (#97000411)	715 Armour Rd. 39°08′32″N 94°34′17″W	North Kansas City	
34	South Liberty Courthouse Square Historic District	South Liberty Courthouse Square Historic District	December 28, 1992 (#92001680)	2 S. Main St., 10 E. Kansas St., 1-17 E. Kansas St. 39°14′45″N 94°25′11″W	Liberty	
35	Watkins Mill	Watkins Mill	November 13, 1966 (#66000416)	6 miles (9.7 km) northwest of Excelsior; 39°24′36″N 94°15′45″W	Excelsior Springs	
36	West Liberty Courthouse Square Historic District		December 28, 1992 (#92001681)	12-16 N. Main St. 39°14′47″N 94°25′14″W	Liberty	
37	Wheeling Corrugating Company Building	Wheeling Corrugating Company Building	October 21, 1994 (#94001220)	820 E. 14th Ave. 39°08′04″N 94°34′14″W	North Kansas City	
38	Woodneath	Woodneath	February 17, 1978 (#78001640)	8900 NE Flintlock Rd. 39°15′12″N 94°28′03″W	Kansas City	
39	Wyman School	Wyman School	July 24, 2008 (#08000695)	100 Dunbar St. 39°20′23″N 94°13′41″W	Excelsior Springs	

== See also ==
- List of National Historic Landmarks in Missouri
- National Register of Historic Places listings in Missouri
