= Clinton House =

Clinton House may refer to:

in the United States

(by state)

- Clinton House (Fayetteville, Arkansas), listed on the National Register of Historic Places (NRHP)
- Bill Clinton Birthplace, Hope, Arkansas, NRHP-listed
- Bill Clinton Boyhood Home, Hot Springs, Arkansas, listed on the NRHP in Arkansas
- Clinton House (Liberty, Missouri), listed on the NRHP in Missouri
- Capt. F. L. Clinton House, Pascagoula, Mississippi, listed on the NRHP in Mississippi
- Charles Clinton Stone Row House, Tonopah, Nevada, NRHP-listed
- Clinton House (Ithaca, New York), a 19th-century building listed on the NRHP
- Morris Clinton House, Newark Valley, New York, NRHP-listed
- Clinton House (Poughkeepsie, New York), NRHP-listed
- Clinton-Hardy House, Tulsa, Oklahoma, NRHP-listed
