= Garrison School (Liberty, Missouri) =

School for African Americans

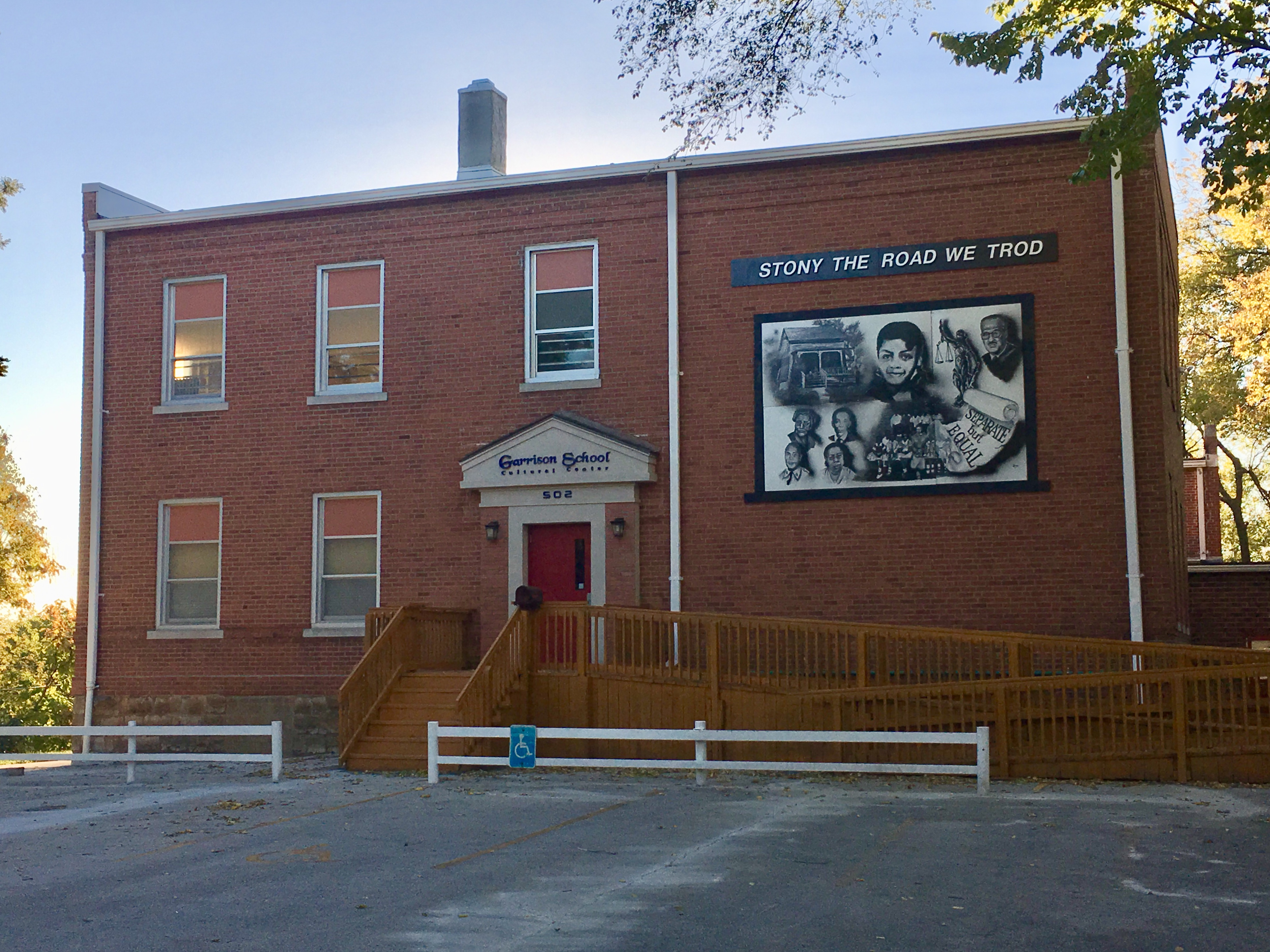

Garrison School was a school for African American students in Liberty, Missouri (in Clay County, Missouri). The school was named for William Lloyd Garrison, an abolitionist who served in U.S. President Abraham Lincoln’s cabinet. One of the school's former buildings is now a cultural center. It is part of the National Register of Historic Places, since it is listed Garrison School Historic District. A historical marker was placed and dedicated in front of the school building in 2020.

The school burned in 1911 and was replaced with a brick building. An addition was added about 1940 as well as the gymnasium/ auditorium. Garrison School had various principals. Its high school department was eventually closed by the board of education and students were bussed to Kansas City's Lincoln High School. It then went up to 10th grade and students had to take a bus to Kansas City to attend Lincoln High School to complete their secondary education. The historic district was listed on the National Register of Historic Places in 2001.

== See also ==
- National Register of Historic Places listings in Clay County, Missouri
- Liberty High School (Liberty, Missouri)
- William Jewell College in Liberty
