= Rose Branch =

Stream in the American state of Missouri

Coordinates: 39°14′02″N 94°18′14″W

Rose Branch is a stream in Clay County in the U.S. state of Missouri. It is a north bank tributary of the Missouri River which it enters just west of Missouri City.

Rose Branch was named after Thad Rose, an early settler.

== See also ==
- List of rivers of Missouri
