= The Elms Historic District =

Historic district in Missouri, United States

- U.S. National Register of Historic Places
- U.S. Historic district
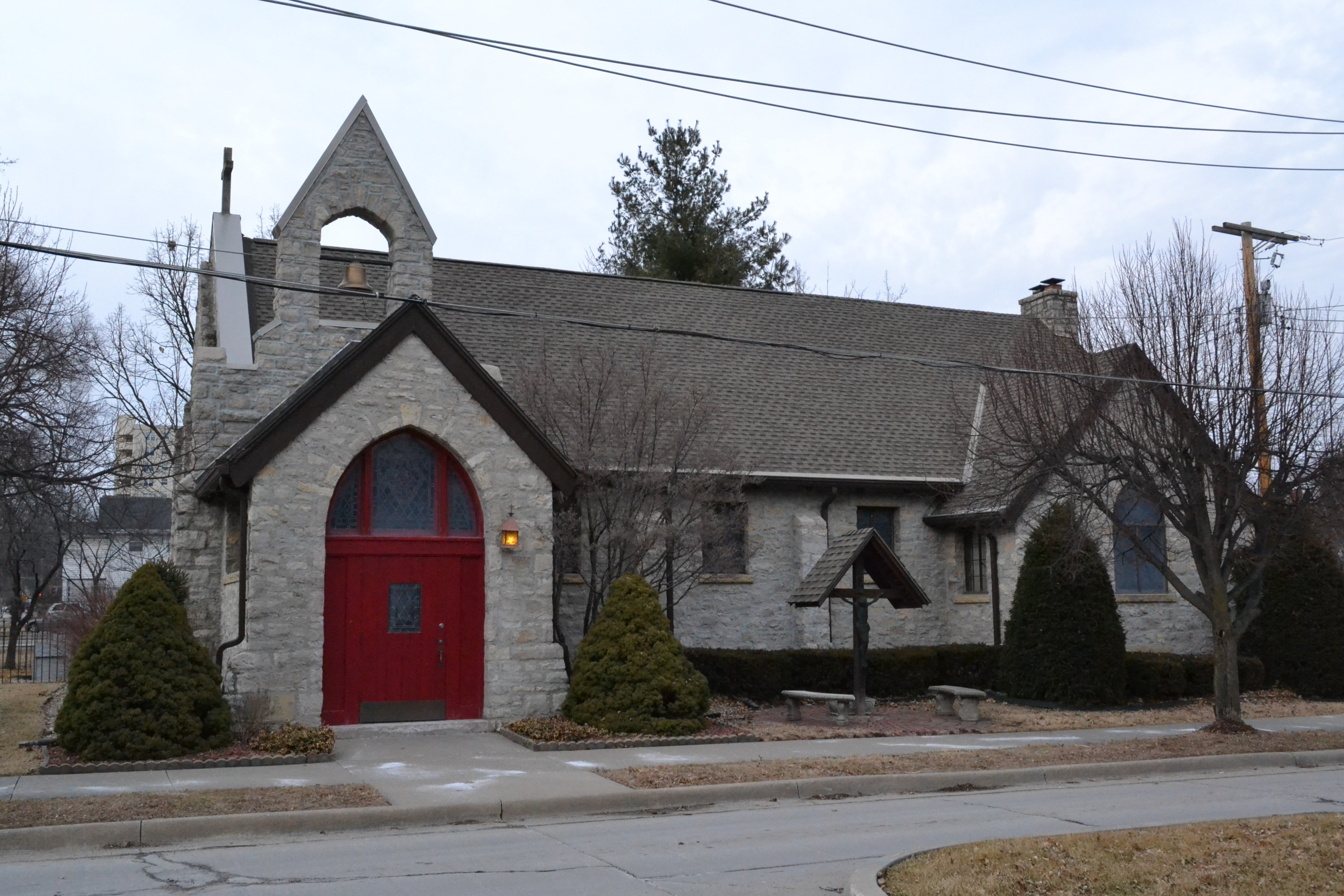
- St. Luke's Episcopal Church

- Location within Missouri Location within the United States
- Location: Roughly 400 blk. Regent Ave., 500 blk. Elms Blvd., 500-600 blocks Kansas City Ave., Excelsior Springs, Missouri
- Coordinates: 39°20′15″N 94°13′34″W
- Area: 26.11 acres (10.57 ha)
- Built: 1887
- Architect: Bradley, John O.; Jackson & McIlvain, et al.
- Architectural style: Gothic Revival, Tudor Revival, Bungalow
- MPS: Historic Resources of Excelsior Springs, Missouri
- NRHP reference No.: 14000091
- Added to NRHP: March 31, 2014

The Elms Historic District is a national historic district located at Excelsior Springs, Clay County, Missouri, United States. It encompasses 31 contributing buildings, 1 contributing site, and 7 contributing structures in a predominantly residential section of Excelsior Springs. The district developed between about 1887 and 1963, and includes representative examples of Gothic Revival, Tudor Revival, and Bungalow style architecture. It is anchored by the separately listed Elms Hotel and consists of two historic residential plats: the Central Park and the Elms Addition.

It was listed on the National Register of Historic Places in 2014.

== See also ==
- National Register of Historic Places listings in Clay County, Missouri
