= Garrison School Historic District =

Historic district in Missouri, United States

- U.S. National Register of Historic Places
- U.S. Historic district
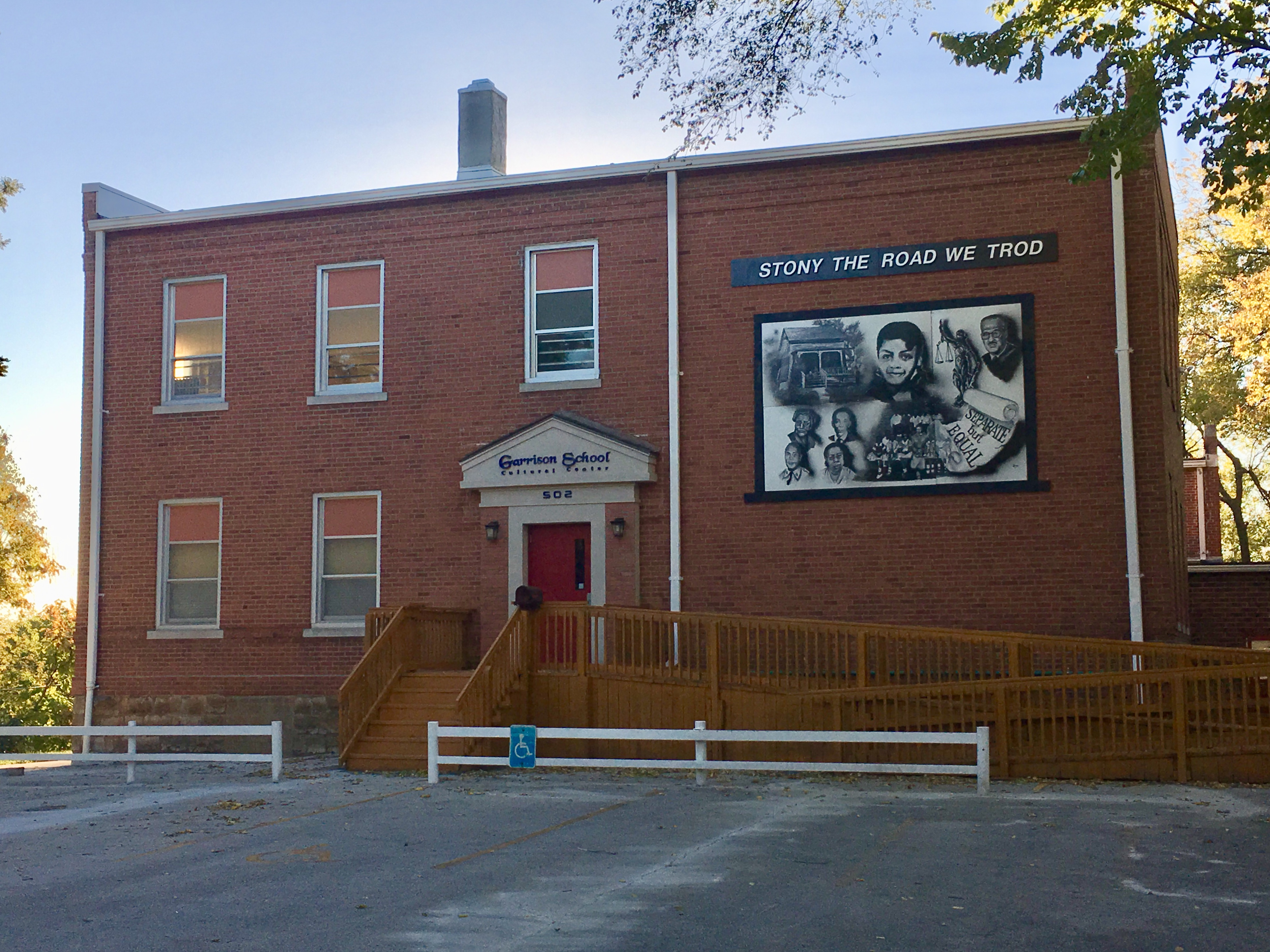

- Location within Missouri Location within the United States
- Location: Roughly along N. Main St. and N. Water St., Liberty, Missouri
- Coordinates: 39°15′14″N 94°25′14″W
- Area: 2 acres (0.81 ha)
- Architectural style: Double Pen, et al.
- MPS: Liberty, Clay County, Missouri MPS AD
- NRHP reference No.: 00001607
- Added to NRHP: January 4, 2001

Garrison School Historic District is a national historic district located at Liberty, Clay County, Missouri. It encompasses six contributing buildings associated with the African-American community of Liberty. The district developed between about 1900 and 1942, and contains a variety of National Folk housing types, as well as the brick Garrison School and the limestone African Methodist Church. The district was listed on the National Register of Historic Places in 2001.

Garrison School had various principals. A gymnasoum was added in 1938. It went up to 10th grade and students had to take a bus to Kansas City to attend Lincoln High School to complete their secondary education.

== See also ==
- National Register of Historic Places listings in Clay County, Missouri
