= Hall of Waters =

Historic building in Missouri, United States

- U.S. National Register of Historic Places
- U.S. Historic district – Contributing property
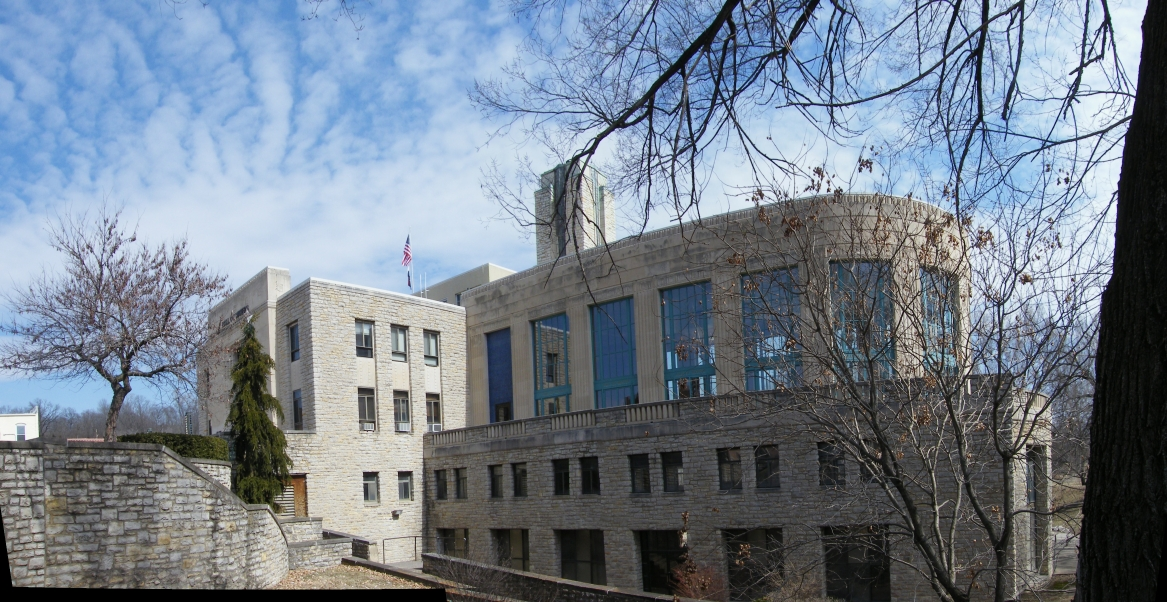
- Hall of Waters, central landmark of Excelsior Springs' mineral-water resort district

- Location within Missouri Location within the United States
- Interactive map showing the location for Hall of Waters
- Location: 201 E. Broadway, Excelsior Springs, Missouri
- Coordinates: 39°20′30″N 94°13′20″W
- Area: 3 acres (1.2 ha)
- Built: 1937
- Architect: Keene & Simpson
- Architectural style: Modern Movement
- NRHP reference No.: 83000977
- Added to NRHP: June 9, 1983

Hall of Waters, also known as Siloam Park and Springs, is a historic building located at Excelsior Springs, Clay County, Missouri. It is currently the City Hall of Excelsior Springs. It is the site of the first spring of many discovered in Excelsior Springs in the 1880s and 1890s. It was built as a mineral water health resort, with mineral baths and water bottling plant, capturing water from the springs. The building played a central role in the development of Excelsior Springs as a mineral-water health resort destination, supporting nearby hotels, bathhouses, and tourism infrastructure including The Elms Hotel and Spa.

It was designed by the architectural firm Keene & Simpson and built in 1936-37 as Public Works Administration Project #5252. It is a five-level, reinforced concrete T-shaped building with strong Art Deco and Depression Modern features. It features a decorative boiler stack tower with cast stone and an aluminum cap 30 feet high.

It was listed on the National Register of Historic Places in 1983. It is located in the Excelsior Springs Hall of Waters Commercial East Historic District. In 2020, the National Trust for Historic Preservation named it as one of America's most endangered historic places. It is currently used as city offices and has a visitor center.

== Role in mineral water tourism ==
The Hall of Waters was constructed during the height of Excelsior Springs' prominence as a mineral spring health resort in the late nineteenth and early twentieth centuries. Its bathing facilities and bottling operations were intended to centralize and modernize the distribution of mineral waters that had drawn visitors to the city since the 1880s. The building functioned as both a civic landmark and an economic engine supporting Excelsior Springs' resort identity.

Hotels and accommodations throughout the city, including the nearby Elms Hotel and Spa, served visitors who traveled to Excelsior Springs seeking mineral water treatments and rest cures. The Hall of Waters represented the municipal investment in sustaining the community’s health-tourism economy during the New Deal era.

Contemporary travel publications continue to reference the Hall of Waters as a defining landmark of the city’s spa heritage. A 2026 feature in Travel + Leisure described the building as a focal point of Excelsior Springs' mineral-water culture and noted its proximity to downtown attractions and historic resort properties.
