= Woodneath =

Farmhouse in Kansas City, Missouri

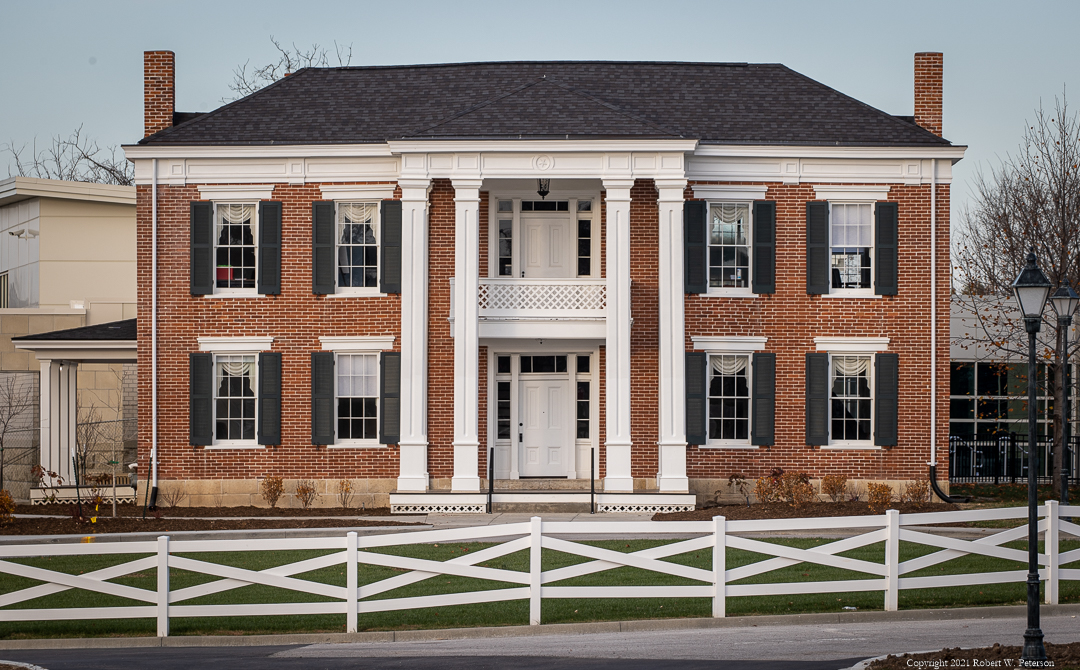
- Woodneath Home
- Interactive map of the Woodneath area

General information
- Location: Clay County, Missouri, 8900 NE Flintlock Road
- Woodneath
- U.S. National Register of Historic Places
- Location within Missouri Location within the United States
- Coordinates: 39°15′12″N 94°28′03″W
- Area: 26.5 acres (10.7 ha)
- Built: 1855-1856
- Architect: Myers, Frederick; Morrison, Thomas
- Architectural style: Greek Revival
- NRHP reference No.: 78001640
- Added to NRHP: February 17, 1978

Woodneath, also known as the Elbridge Arnold Homestead, is a historic farmhouse located in Kansas City, Missouri that was occupied by the Arnold, Moore, and Crouch families between 1855 and the late 1970s. It was named "Woodneath" after the abundant oak, pine, and sugar maples on the property, and many of those tree varieties are still present on the property today. The farmhouse and surrounding property are good examples of the agrarian lifestyle common in Clay County, Missouri during this time period. The property is currently adjacent to the Woodneath Farms neighborhood, named for the farmhouse.

The farmhouse is one of the oldest antebellum structures in Kansas City and remains an important surviving example of a brick, Greek Revival style farmhouse. Crouch descendants owned Woodneath until they sold it, and 33 acres surrounding the home, to Mid-Continent Public Library in 2008. In June 2013 the Mid-Continent Public Library system constructed a new state of the art Woodneath Branch around, and attached to, the historic home. Mid-Continent has plans to repurpose the Woodneath home as the Woodneath Story Center, using the different rooms of the home as different story centers. Woodneath was added to the National Register of Historic Places in 1978.

== History ==
This historic farmhouse in Kansas City's Northland was constructed between 1854 and 1856. The Arnold family owned the land, with Mr. Elbridge Arnold being the head of the household. In October 1855 Mr. Arnold passed suddenly, leaving his widow, Mrs. Finetta Ann Arnold, to finish the home with slave labor and the help of local carpenters. Eldridge Arnold was originally from Virginia and enslaved 7 people in 1850, but 5 at his death in 1855. As per his probate record, these enslaved people were named Anna, Mary Jane, Lucy, Henry, and David. There was a short period of time during the Civil War when the west second story bedroom served as a place for the Arnold's eldest daughter, Sara M. Arnold, to teach school. The Brick-Monroe School, where local classes were usually taught, was forced to close due to war-related skirmishes in the area.

The Arnold family sold the property to Presley Moore after the Civil War. The Moore family owned it from approximately 1870 to 1900, during which time Presley Moore was inspired to name the farm "Woodneath" after the abundant oak, pine and sugar maples on the property.

After the turn of the 20th century, the Moore family sold the farmstead to the Crouches. During the years 1937 through 1953, under the ownership of Edwin Y. Crouch, the property was recognized as the Crouch Farm Dairy. The farmhouse continued primarily as an occupied residence, with the land it was on being used for agricultural business, until the mid-1970s.

Crouch descendants owned Woodneath until they sold it and 33 surrounding acres to the Mid-Continent Public Library in 2008.

== Library construction ==
In 2011, construction of the most technologically advanced library in the region began. The state of the art library was completed in June 2013 and surrounds the original, restored farmhouse. It was funded through $13 million in public investment. As described in the Woodneath Case

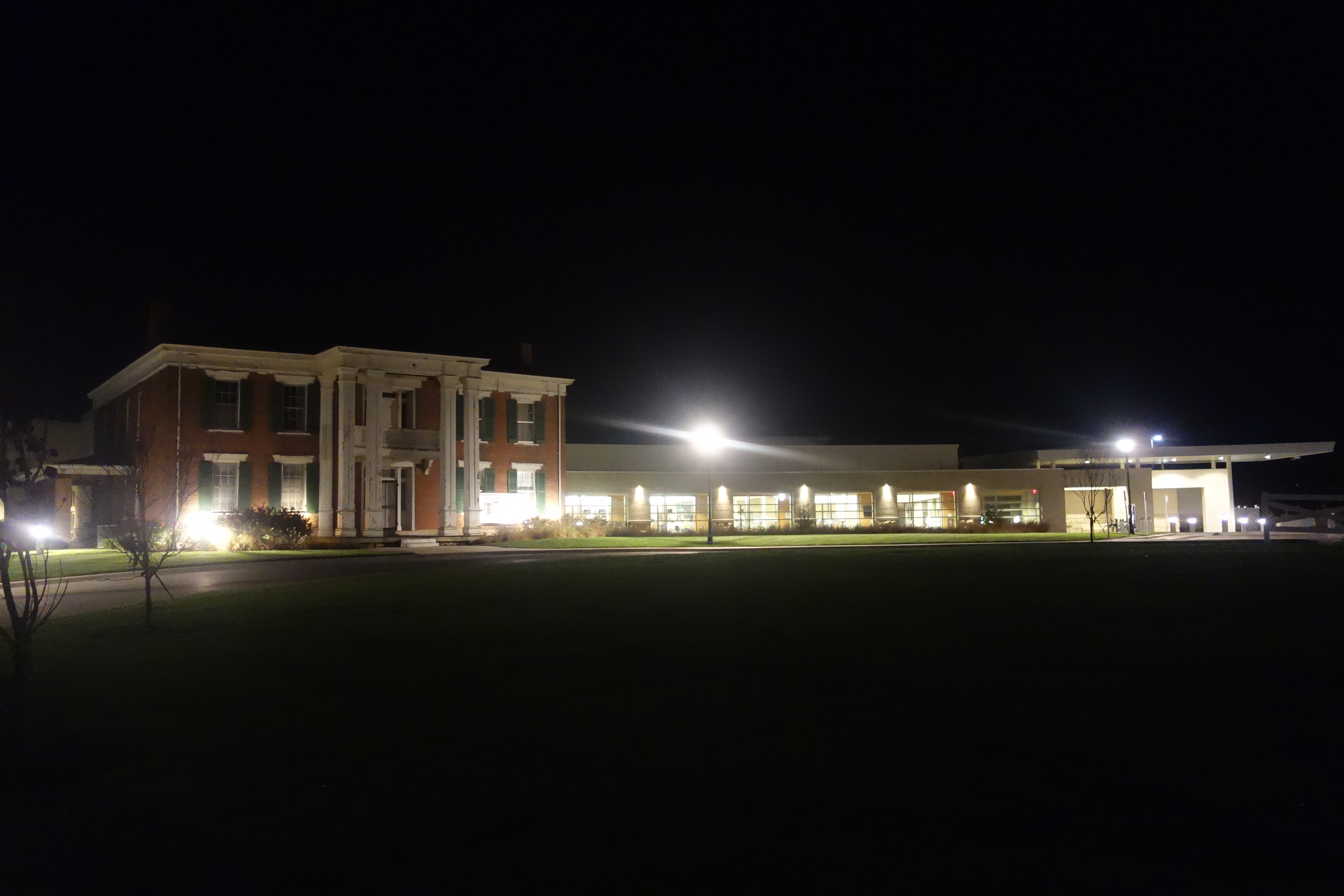
Woodneath Library Center at Night

The Library has made great effort to assure the new, much larger building would not overshadow the house. Architects (Sapp Design Architects) designed it to sit several feet lower than the historic home. The Library chose neutral building materials for the new addition to allow Woodneath's red brick to stand out. The new building's design, with its arching form and colonnade features reminiscent of Greek revival structures, suggests it is wrapping its "arm" around the old manor.

The future usage plans for the farmhouse and property are extensive. The home itself has become the Woodneath Story Center. The Story Center is a place where the past, present and future merge for the purpose of storytelling. The acreage surrounding the library holds promise for historic and natural interpretation, walking trails and public green space. "Kansas City enjoys a vibrant storytelling community and the Story Center will bring this art, in its various traditional and modern forms, to all generations in the community and region. Because this concept is still in development, national and local partners involved in the planning of the project are currently being identified and gathered to participate in the project." The Mid Continent Public Library hopes to secure $4.025 million in private contributions to actualize their vision for the Woodneath Story Center.
