= Jewell-Lightburne Historic District =

Historic district in Missouri, United States

- U.S. National Register of Historic Places
- U.S. Historic district
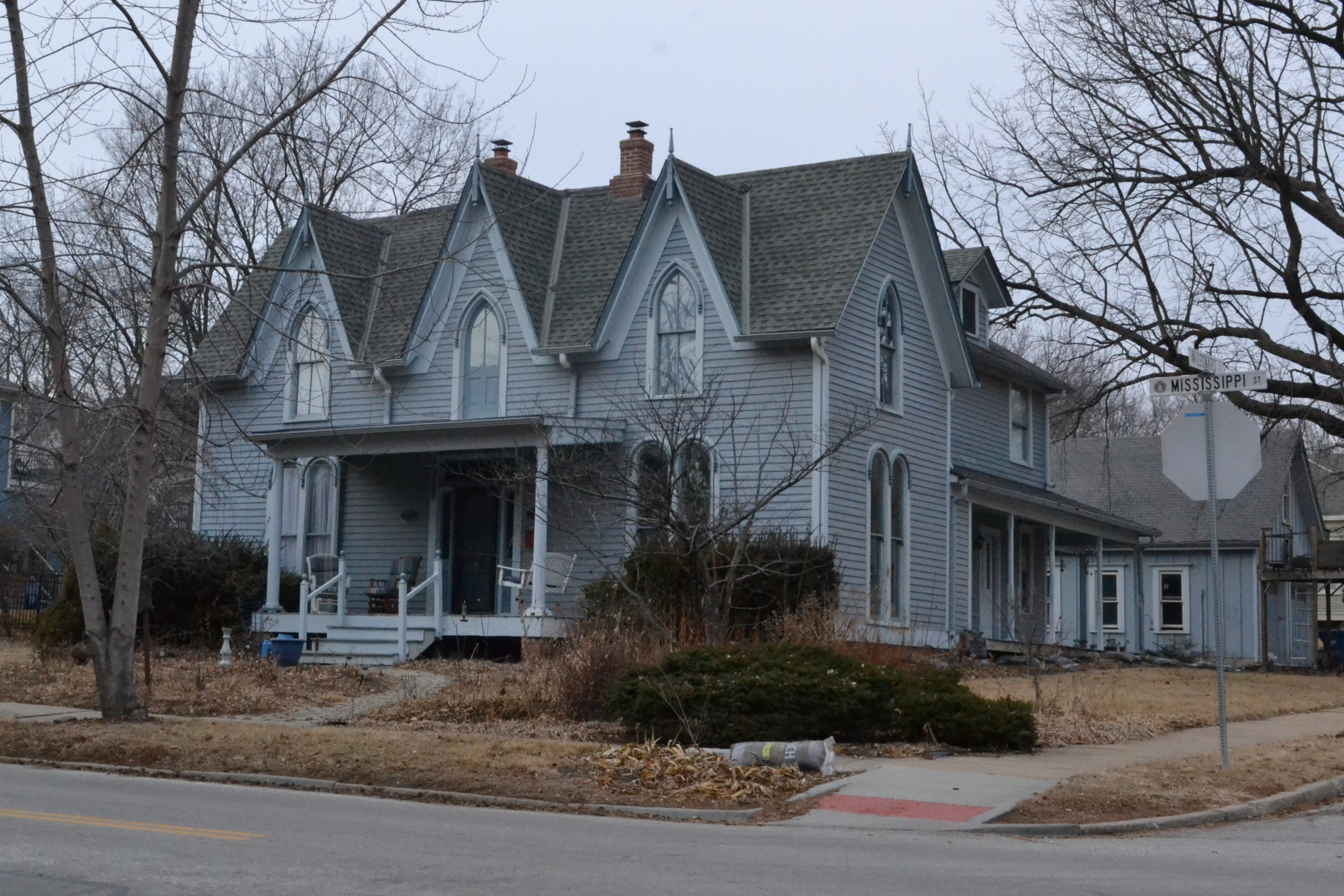

- Location within Missouri Location within the United States
- Location: Roughly bounded by N. Jewell St., E. Mill St., Main St. and Gordon St., Liberty, Missouri
- Coordinates: 39°14′53″N 94°24′54″W
- Area: 78 acres (32 ha)
- MPS: Liberty, Clay County, Missouri MPS AD
- NRHP reference No.: 00001606
- Added to NRHP: January 4, 2001

Jewell-Lightburne Historic District is a national historic district located at Liberty, Clay County, Missouri. It encompasses 236 contributing buildings in a predominantly residential section of Liberty. The district developed between about 1852 and 1946, and includes representative examples of Greek Revival, Queen Anne, Tudor Revival, Prairie School, and Bungalow / American Craftsman style residential architecture. Located in the district is the separately listed Frank Hughes Memorial Library.

It was listed on the National Register of Historic Places in 2001.
