= Excelsior Springs Hall of Waters Commercial West Historic District =

Historic district in Missouri, United States

- U.S. National Register of Historic Places
- U.S. Historic district
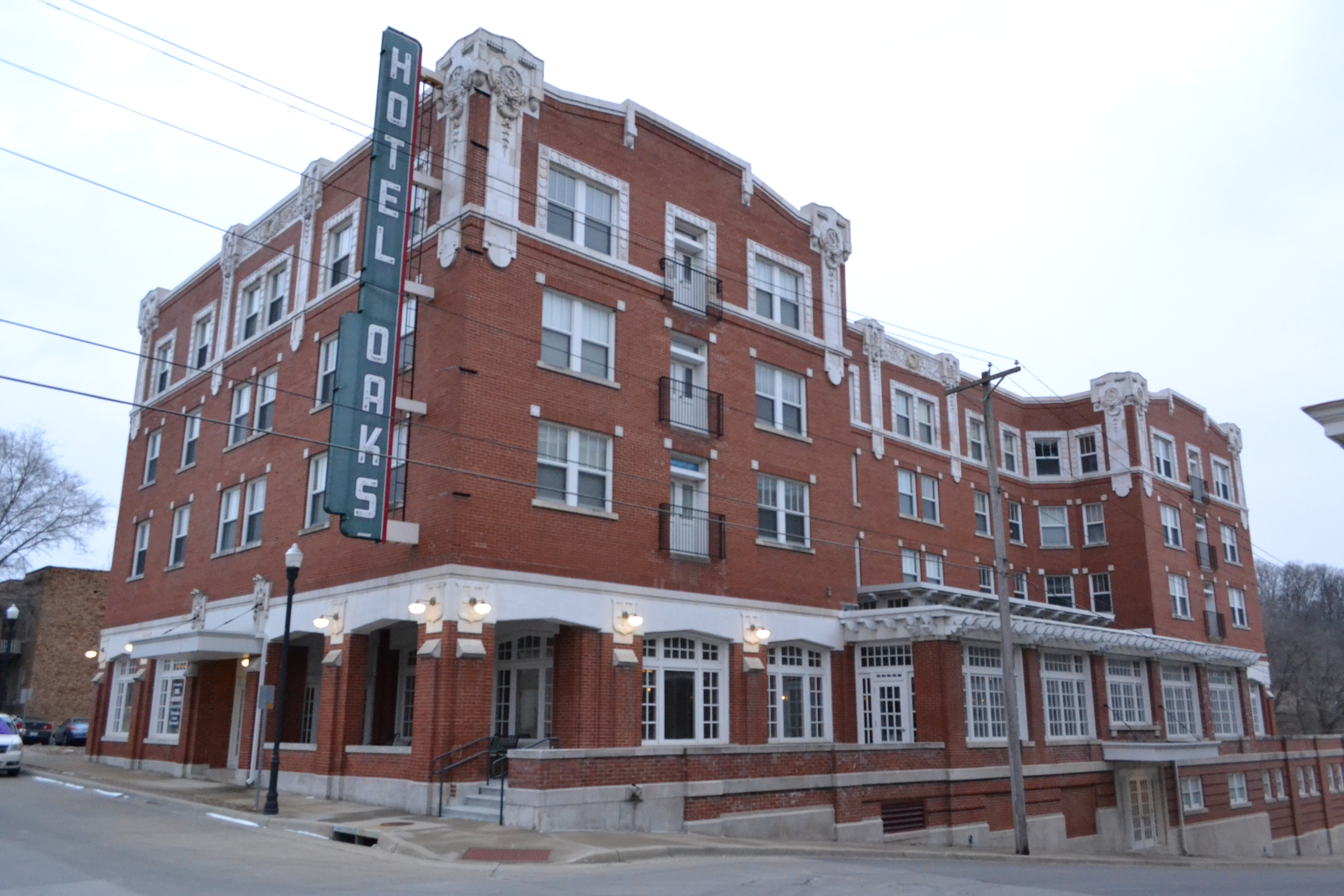
- Hotel Oaks

- Location within Missouri Location within the United States
- Location: Roughly along portions of Thompson, and St. Louis Aves.; South, Main, Marietta, and Spring Sts.; and Elms Blvd., Excelsior Springs, Missouri
- Coordinates: 39°20′33″N 94°14′13″W
- Area: 9 acres (3.6 ha)
- Architect: Jackson, Frank J.; Schrage, William F.
- Architectural style: Late Victorian, Late 19th And 20th Century Revivals, et al.
- NRHP reference No.: 99000637
- Added to NRHP: May 27, 1999

Excelsior Springs Hall of Waters Commercial West Historic District is a national historic district located at Excelsior Springs, Clay County, Missouri. It encompasses 20 contributing buildings in the central business district of Excelsior Springs. The district developed between about 1894 and 1948, and includes representative examples of Victorian, Classical Revival, and Art Deco style architecture. Notable buildings include the Excelsior Springs Post Office (1914), McCleary Thornton-Minor Hospital (c. 1910), Montgomery Ward Building (1929), J.J. Newberry Company Building (c. 1929), J.C. Penney Company Building (c. 1929), Elks Lodge No. 1001 (c. 1913-1926), Washington Hotel and Orpheus Theatre (c. 1900-1905), I.O.O.F. Building (1913-1917), Arlington Hotel (1899-1900), and Ideal Hotel (c. 1900-1905).

It was listed on the National Register of Historic Places in 1999.
