= Colonial Hotel (Excelsior Springs, Missouri) =

Historic hotel in Missouri, United States

- U.S. National Register of Historic Places
- Location within Missouri Location within the United States
- Location: 328 E Broadway, Excelsior Springs, Missouri
- Coordinates: 39°20′33″N 94°13′13″W
- Area: less than one acre
- Built: 1924
- Architectural style: Late 19th And 20th Century Revivals
- NRHP reference No.: 10000392
- Added to NRHP: June 24, 2010

Colonial Hotel, also known as Colonial Apartments, is a historic hotel located at Excelsior Springs, Clay County, Missouri. It was built in 1924, and is a three-story, red brick building. It features a three-tiered porch supported by four nearly full-height square brick columns. The Colonial provided residential space for those visiting Excelsior Springs for an extended period of time in order to "take the waters" at the town's multiple mineral springs.

It was listed on the National Register of Historic Places in 2010.
