= First Methodist Church (Excelsior Springs, Missouri) =

Historic church in Missouri, United States

- U.S. National Register of Historic Places
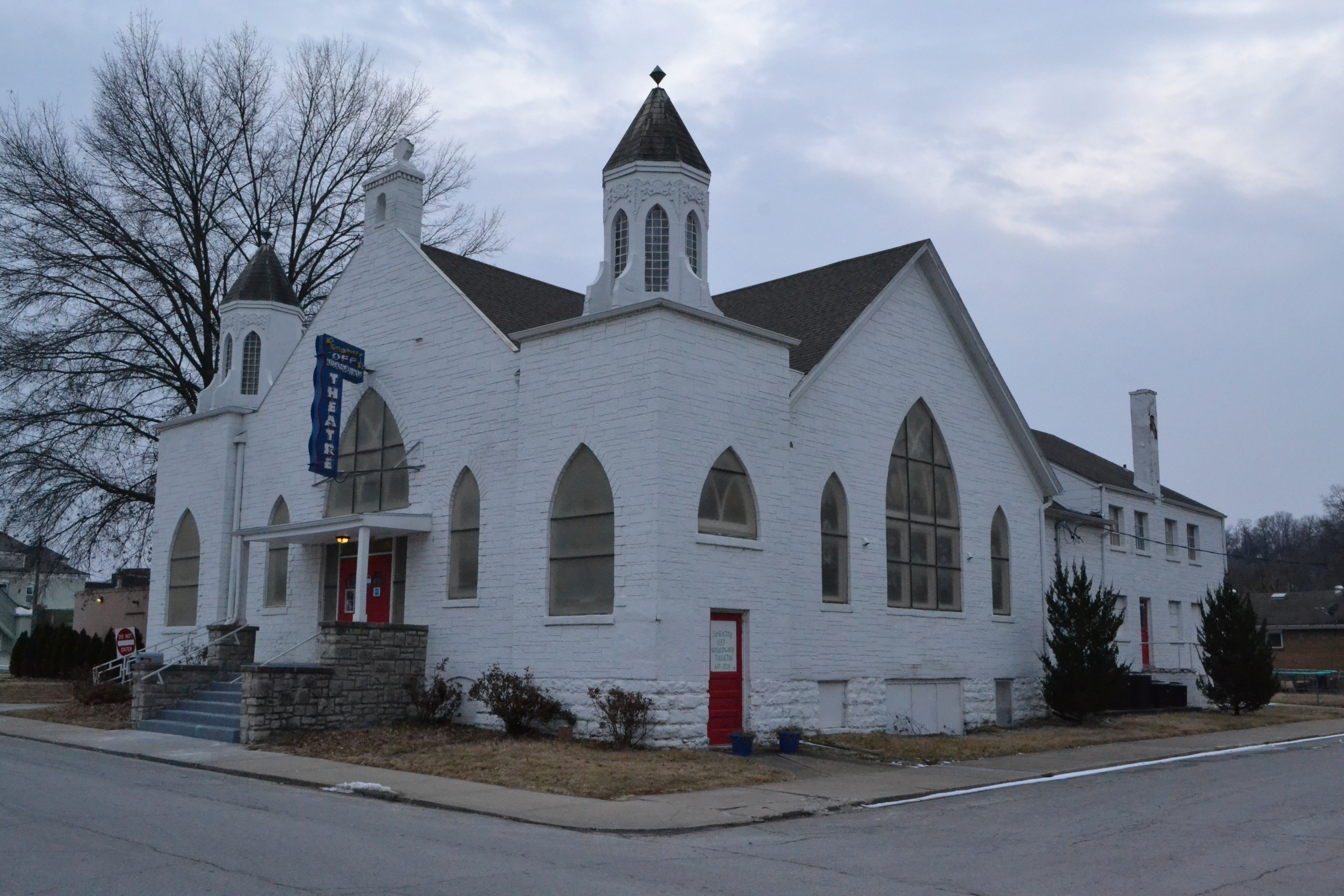

- Location within Missouri Location within the United States
- Location: 114 N. Marietta St., Excelsior Springs, Missouri
- Coordinates: 39°20′41″N 94°13′27″W
- Area: less than one acre
- Built: 1903, 1948
- Built by: Knipp, Richard Construction Co.
- Architect: Walker, Robin A.
- Architectural style: Late 19th And 20th Century Revivals
- NRHP reference No.: 09000856
- Added to NRHP: October 28, 2009

First Methodist Church, also known as Mt. Zion Methodist Church, First Methodist Episcopal Church, and Marietta Baptist Church, is a historic Methodist church located at 114 N. Marietta Street in Excelsior Springs, Clay County, Missouri. It was built in 1948, and incorporated portions of the existing 1903 Gothic Revival style church. The interior is based on the Akron Plan. The church features square tower pavilions topped by large octagonal cupolas supported by buttresses.

It was listed on the National Register of Historic Places in 2009.
