= Wyman School =

Historic school in Missouri, United States

- U.S. National Register of Historic Places
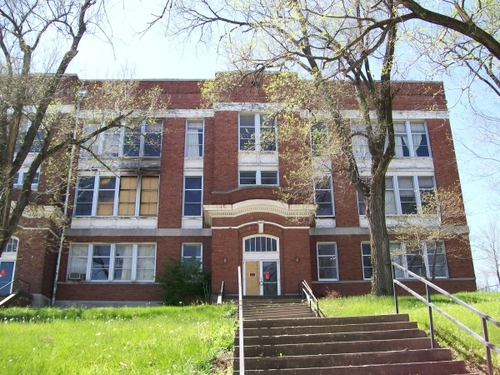
- Wyman School in September 2012

- Location within Missouri Location within the United States
- Location: 100 Dunbar St., Excelsior Springs, Missouri
- Coordinates: 39°20′42″N 94°13′42″W
- Area: 1.8 acres (0.73 ha)
- Built: 1912
- Architectural style: Classical Revival
- NRHP reference No.: 08000695
- Added to NRHP: July 24, 2008

Wyman School, also known as Excelsior Springs High School (and later Wyman Public/Elementary School until the mid-1990s), is a historic school building located in Excelsior Springs, Clay County, Missouri.

== History ==
Wyman school was built in 1912. It was named after Anson Wyman, founder of Excelsior Springs. The school was eventually converted to an elementary school. After classes ended in the mid-1990s, the building was used as a community theatre before becoming vacant.

The building is a three-story, rectangular brick building with Classical Revival design elements. It has a flat roof and sits in a limestone foundation. A classroom annex (a non-historic prefabricated building) also sat west of a former power station. The contributing plant, built in 1913, was on the south end of the school property. The structure provided heat via a coal-burning furnace. Due to a partial roof collapse, noted in 2008 and the extent of damage discovered during a 2021 environmental study, the city decided to demolish it. The demolition occurred on July 5, 2022.

Wyman School was purchased by the city of Excelsior Springs. It was listed on the National Register of Historic Places in 2008.
