= Excelsior Springs, Missouri =

- City
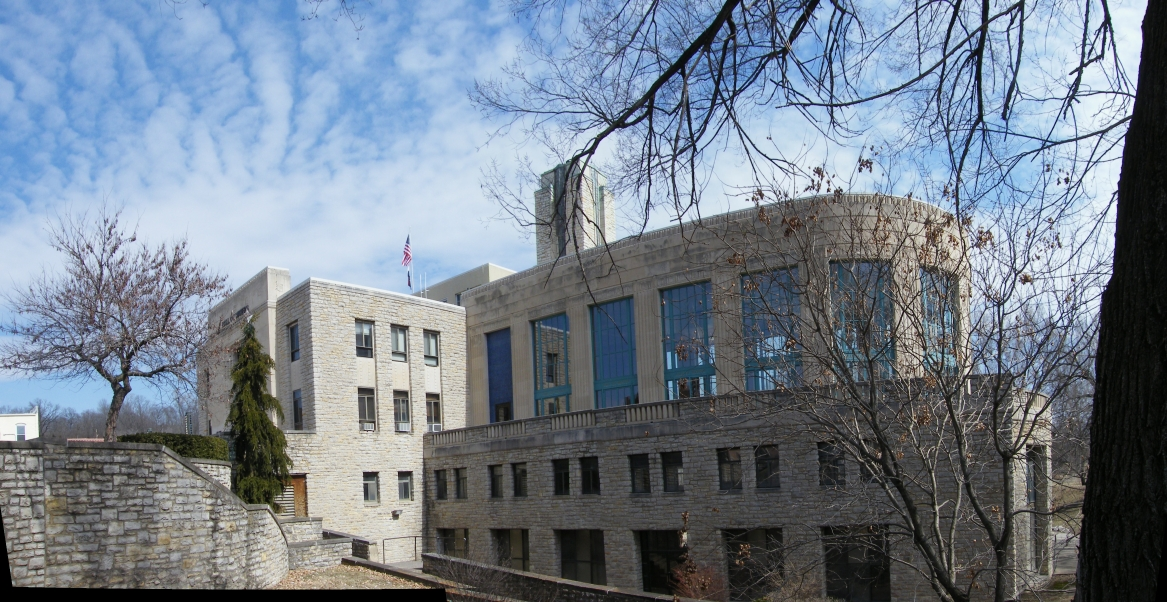
- Hall of Waters (now City Hall)

- Location of Excelsior Springs, Missouri
- Coordinates: 39°20′21″N 94°14′24″W
- Country: United States
- State: Missouri
- Counties: Clay, Ray

Area
  - Total: 10.86 sq mi (28.13 km^{2})
  - Land: 10.84 sq mi (28.08 km^{2})
  - Water: 0.019 sq mi (0.05 km^{2})
- Elevation: 866 ft (264 m)

Population (2020)
  - Total: 10,553
  - Density: 973.3/sq mi (375.79/km^{2})
- Time zone: UTC-6 (Central (CST))
  - Summer (DST): UTC-5 (CDT)
- ZIP code: 64024
- Area code: 816
- FIPS code: 29-23086
- GNIS feature ID: 2394718
- Website: cityofesmo.com

Excelsior Springs is a city in Clay and Ray counties in the U.S. state of Missouri and part of the Kansas City metropolitan area. The population was 10,553 at the 2020 census. It is located approximately 30 miles (48 km) northeast of central Kansas City, Missouri.

== Geography ==
Excelsior Springs is located along the East Fork Fishing River.

According to the United States Census Bureau, the city has a total area of 10.45 square miles (27.07 km^{2}), of which 10.43 square miles (27.01 km^{2}) is land and 0.02 square miles (0.05 km^{2}) is water.

== Demographics ==
Historical population
Census	Pop.	Note	%±
1890	2,034		—
1900	1,881		−7.5%
1910	3,900		107.3%
1920	4,165		6.8%
1930	4,565		9.6%
1940	4,864		6.5%
1950	5,888		21.1%
1960	6,473		9.9%
1970	9,411		45.4%
1980	10,424		10.8%
1990	10,354		−0.7%
2000	10,847		4.8%
2010	11,084		2.2%
2020	10,553		−4.8%
U.S. Decennial Census

=== Racial and ethnic composition ===
Excelsior Springs city, Missouri – Racial and ethnic composition Note: the US Census treats Hispanic/Latino as an ethnic category. This table excludes Latinos from the racial categories and assigns them to a separate category. Hispanics/Latinos may be of any race.
Race / Ethnicity (NH = Non-Hispanic)	Pop 2000	Pop 2010	Pop 2020	% 2000	% 2010	% 2020
White alone (NH)	10,030	10,046	9,223	92.47%	90.64%	87.40%
Black or African American alone (NH)	358	299	169	3.30%	2.70%	1.60%
Native American or Alaska Native alone (NH)	49	72	53	0.45%	0.65%	0.50%
Asian alone (NH)	36	53	40	0.33%	0.48%	0.38%
Native Hawaiian or Pacific Islander alone (NH)	4	7	1	0.04%	0.06%	0.01%
Other race alone (NH)	4	24	43	0.04%	0.22%	0.41%
Mixed race or Multiracial (NH)	165	214	633	1.52%	1.93%	6.00%
Hispanic or Latino (any race)	201	369	391	1.85%	3.33%	3.71%
Total	10,847	11,084	10,553	100.00%	100.00%	100.00%

=== 2020 census ===
As of the 2020 census, Excelsior Springs had a population of 10,553, 4,326 households, 2,784 families, and a population density of 973.5 per square mile (375.9/km^{2}).

The median age was 39.3 years. 23.8% of residents were under the age of 18 and 18.8% were 65 years of age or older. For every 100 females, there were 93.4 males, and for every 100 females age 18 and over, there were 91.0 males age 18 and over.

93.0% of residents lived in urban areas, while 7.0% lived in rural areas.

Of the 4,326 households, 29.9% had children under the age of 18 living in them. 42.0% were married-couple households, 19.4% were households with a male householder and no spouse or partner present, and 30.7% were households with a female householder and no spouse or partner present. About 31.8% of all households were made up of individuals, and 14.0% had someone living alone who was 65 years of age or older.

There were 4,727 housing units, of which 8.5% were vacant. The homeowner vacancy rate was 1.6% and the rental vacancy rate was 7.7%.

Racial composition as of the 2020 census
Race	Number	Percent
White	9,340	88.5%
Black or African American	177	1.7%
American Indian and Alaska Native	64	0.6%
Asian	40	0.4%
Native Hawaiian and Other Pacific Islander	1	0.0%
Some other race	126	1.2%
Two or more races	805	7.6%

=== Income and poverty ===
The 2016–2020 5-year American Community Survey estimates show that the median household income was $60,735 (with a margin of error of +/- $8,455) and the median family income was $69,142 (+/- $7,336). Males had a median income of $42,236 (+/- $7,353) versus $29,330 (+/- $3,387) for females. The median income for those above 16 years old was $35,210 (+/- $4,632). Approximately, 5.6% of families and 12.7% of the population were below the poverty line, including 17.0% of those under the age of 18 and 11.1% of those ages 65 or over.

=== 2010 census ===
As of the census of 2010, there were 11,084 people, 4,278 households, and 2,836 families residing in the city. The population density was 1,062.7 inhabitants per square mile (410.3/km^{2}). There were 4,771 housing units at an average density of 457.4 units per square mile (176.6 units/km^{2}). The racial makeup of the city was 92.6% White, 2.8% African American, 0.7% Native American, 0.5% Asian, 0.1% Pacific Islander, 0.8% from other races, and 2.4% from two or more races. Hispanic or Latino of any race were 3.3% of the population.

There were 4,278 households, of which 34.0% had children under the age of 18 living with them, 46.6% were married couples living together, 14.1% had a female householder with no husband present, 5.6% had a male householder with no wife present, and 33.7% were non-families. 28.7% of all households were made up of individuals, and 11.6% had someone living alone who was 65 years of age or older. The average household size was 2.46 and the average family size was 2.99.

The median age in the city was 36.6 years. 24.9% of residents were under the age of 18; 10.6% were between the ages of 18 and 24; 24.6% were from 25 to 44; 25% were from 45 to 64; and 14.9% were 65 years of age or older. The gender makeup of the city was 48.3% male and 51.7% female.

=== 2000 census ===
As of the census of 2000, there were 10,847 people, 4,079 households, and 2,777 families residing in the city. The population density was 1,104.9 inhabitants per square mile (426.6/km^{2}). There were 4,426 housing units at an average density of 450.8 units per square mile (174.1 units/km^{2}). The racial makeup of the city was 93.29% White, 3.36% African American, 0.50% Native American, 0.34% Asian, 0.04% Pacific Islander, 0.60% from other races, and 1.87% from two or more races. Hispanic or Latino of any race were 1.85% of the population.

There were 4,079 households, out of which 34.3% had children under the age of 18 living with them, 51.0% were married couples living together, 12.7% had a female householder with no husband present, and 31.9% were non-families. 26.8% of all households were made up of individuals, and 11.6% had someone living alone who was 65 years of age or older. The average household size was 2.50 and the average family size was 3.01.

In the city the population was spread out, with 27.2% under the age of 18, 10.9% from 18 to 24, 27.9% from 25 to 44, 20.9% from 45 to 64, and 13.1% who were 65 years of age or older. The median age was 34 years. For every 100 females, there were 93.1 males. For every 100 females age 18 and over, there were 89.1 males.

The median income for a household in the city was $36,657, and the median income for a family was $46,284. Males had a median income of $32,500 versus $22,336 for females. The per capita income for the city was $17,718. About 7.3% of families and 12.2% of the population were below the poverty line, including 12.0% of those under age 18 and 8.5% of those age 65 or over.

== History ==
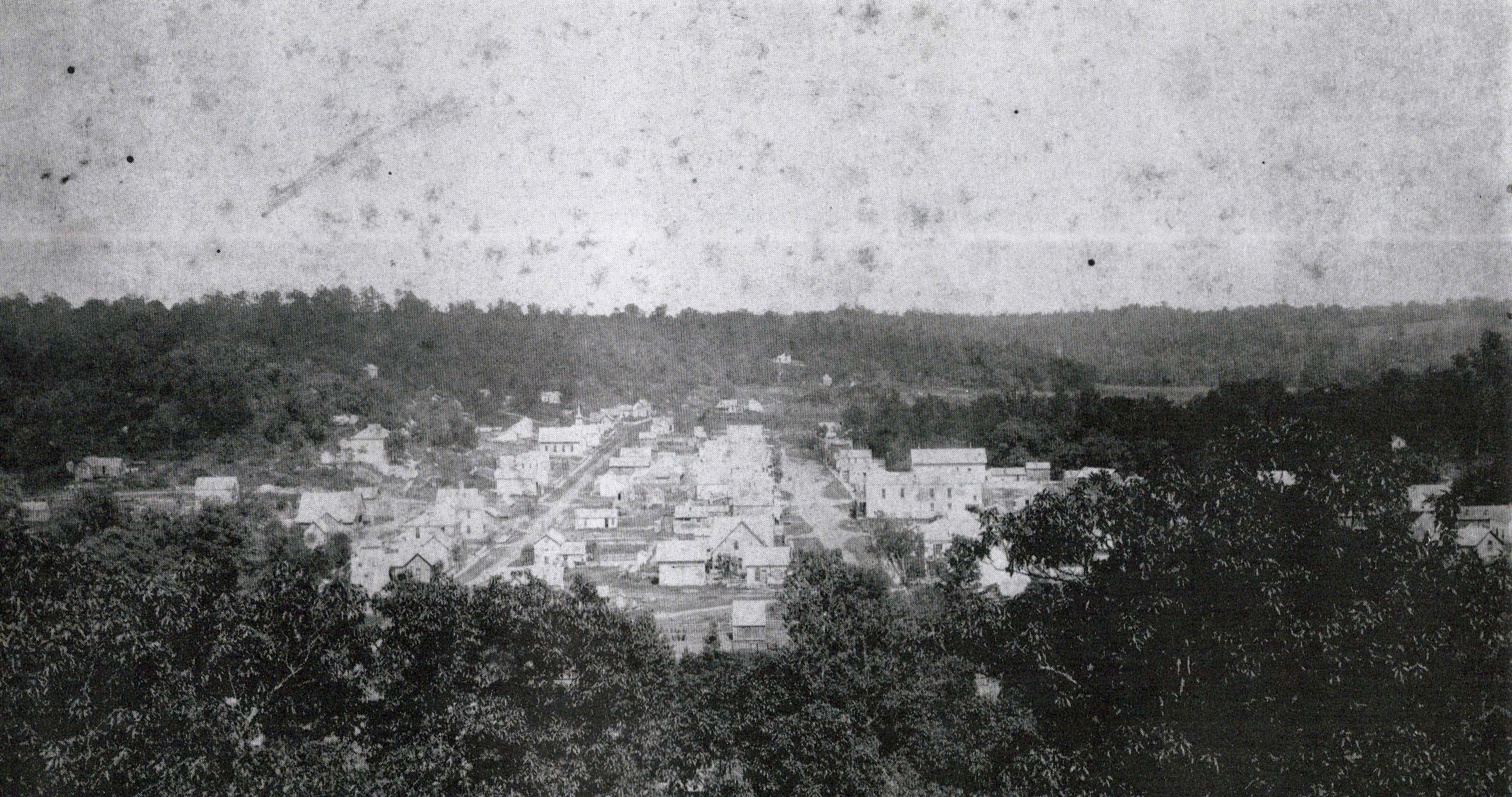
Excelsior Springs, Missouri on July 14, 1886

This location had a major incident during the historic march of Zion's Camp in 1834 when a contingent of about 200 Mormon believers, marching to rescue their brethren in Jackson County, faced an angry mob of more than 300. Near two forks of Fishing River, a terrible fight was about to start when a severe thunderstorm rolled in suddenly and put the mob to flight. Zion's Camp was able to move forward unharmed. Historical markers to the incident are located nearby.

=== 1880s to 1910s ===
The town was founded because of the natural spring water that gushed from the depths of the earth. The spring was accidentally discovered in 1880 by a Black farmer, Travis Mellion, when his daughter Opal fell ill with scrofula, a form of cervical tuberculosis. He asked for advice from nearby campers, and they suggested the spring that oozed from the bank of the Fishing River. Water was brought to his daughter and in a few weeks, her health improved noticeably, and she eventually recovered. A log-cabin farmer, Frederick Kugler, also begin to treat his rheumatic knees and a recurring sore from a Civil War wound, and he soon recovered.

Rev. John Van Buren Flack traveled there in 1880 after hearing about the medicinal values of the spring water. The spring belonged to land owner Anthony W. Wyman. After Flack investigated the water sources, he advised Wyman to have the land platted, water analyzed, and to begin advertising the cures the water held. Flack built a home on a 40-acre (160,000 m^{2}) tract that Wyman had platted and opened the town's first dry goods store and the first church. The spring was named Excelsior after a popular Longfellow poem, which later changed to Siloam.

On August 17, 1880, Flack and Wyman partnered together to form the community of Excelsior. The post office at the time denied that town name, as there was already one in southern Missouri, so it was named Vigniti. The city kept the name until 1882, when it was renamed Excelsior Springs.

Within one year, nearly two hundred households were built in the valley and the nearby hillsides. The springs proved successful and brought many new people to the area, who camped out in tents or in covered wagons. On February 7, 1881, the town received the designation of village. On July 12, 1881, the community was incorporated as a fourth class city, bringing several hotels, boarding houses, churches, schools, an opera house, livery stables, and stores.

In 1881, a second mineral spring was found by Captain J.L. Farris, first called Empire Spring but renamed Regent Spring. A third, Relief Spring, was discovered at the basin in the Fishing River. Many springs were soon discovered in the area, the most prominent being the Relief, Superior, and Saratoga springs. A pump was installed at the Siloam Spring, and steps from Broadway Street and the city's first hotel, the Excelsior, were constructed. Soon a small wooden bridge was built over the Fishing River to an undeveloped peninsula used for visitors to relax while exploring the spring. No city in Missouri had boomed as much as Excelsior Springs had in its first year.

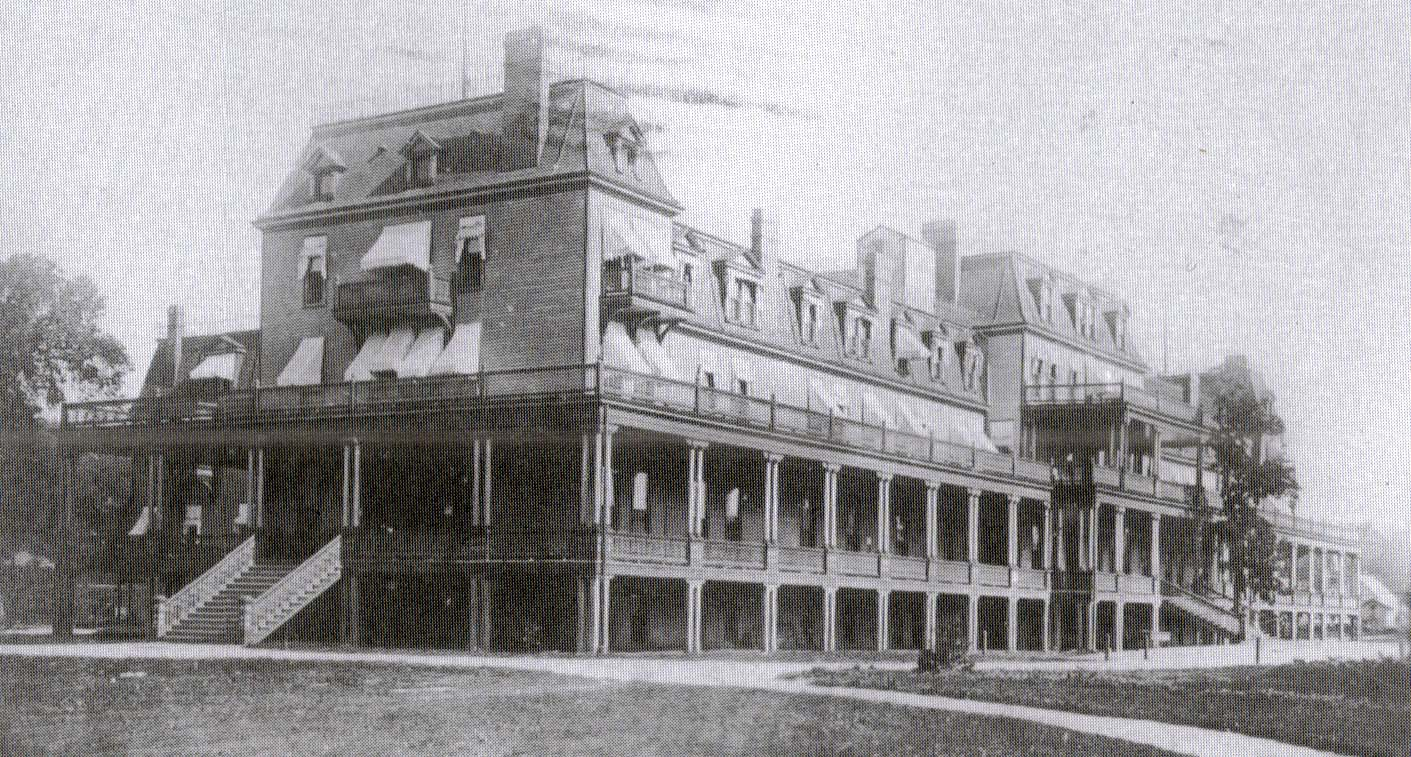
The original Elms Hotel

The city's first hotel, the Excelsior, was built with a foundation of 30 by 70 feet (9.1 by 21.3 m), and locals wondered if a hotel that size would ever be filled to capacity. The Excelsior opened on March 1, 1881, and quickly filled with many visitors seeking the medicinal waters, including from St. Louis, St. Joseph, Kansas City, and Leavenworth. The hotel led until the first Elms Hotel was built and opened in 1888.

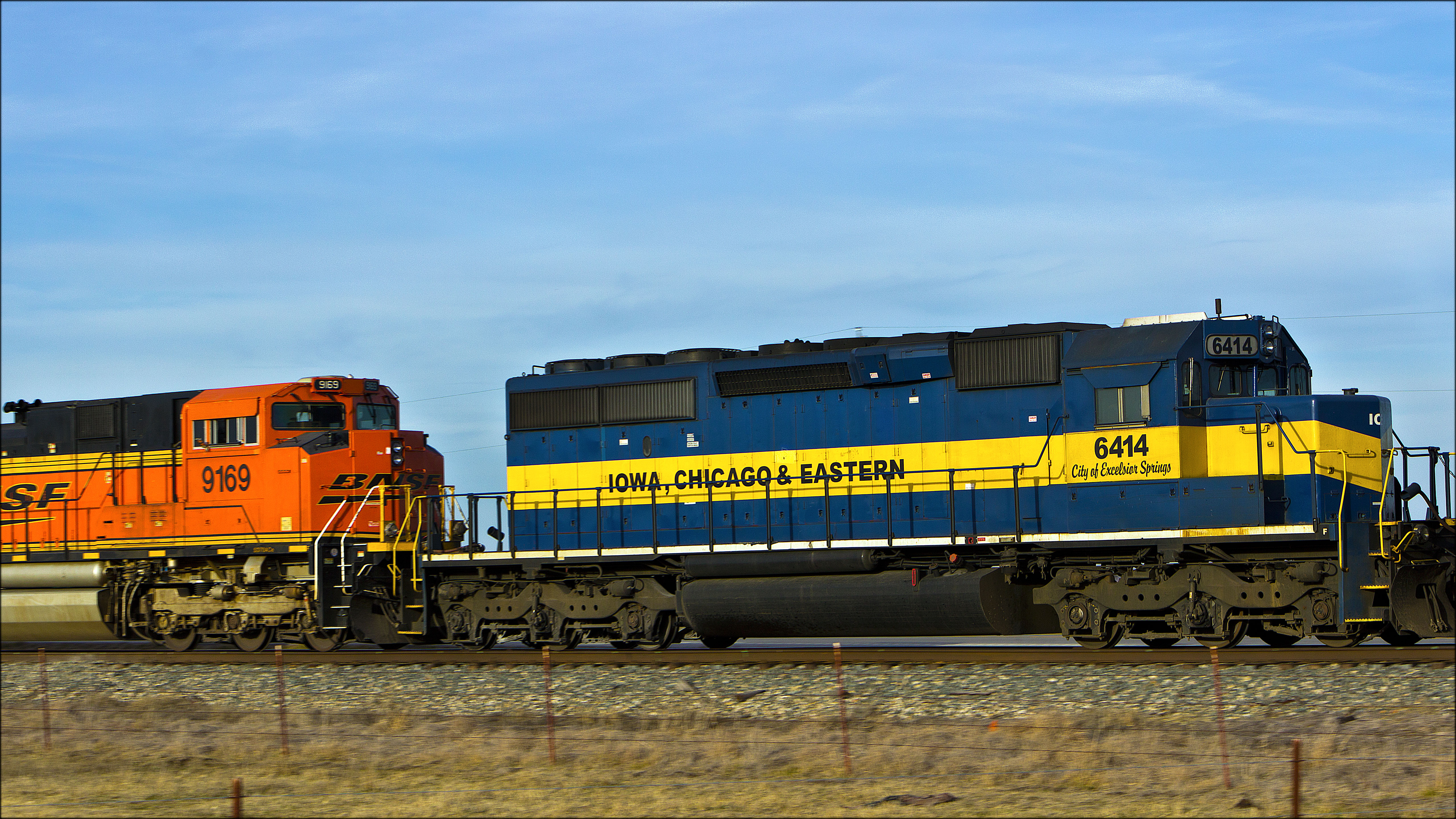
Iowa, Chicago & Eastern Railroad's locomotive #6414 (engine labeled "City Of Excelsior Springs")

In 1887, the Chicago, Milwaukee and St. Paul railroad extended its line from Chicago to Kansas City via Excelsior Springs. This brought a larger influx of visitors to the growing city. By this time, the Relief Springs and Land Company had been formed primarily to advertise and pique the interest of outsiders. The company acquired 1,000 acres (4.0 km^{2}) of land surrounding the city and the Fishing River. The historic Elms Hotel's foundation was soon poured. The Music Hall, a state-of-the-art theater for the time, was built nearby with a seating capacity of 1,320 people. An amusement pavilion was erected but was soon changed into a bottling works facility. A larger pavilion with benches and hooks for cups was placed at Siloam Spring where visitors could partake in the water; soon these mugs became stained by the high iron content of the water. Partnered with the Milwaukee Railroad, the city began to advertise their resort status nationwide. In 1897, the city received its first telephone service.

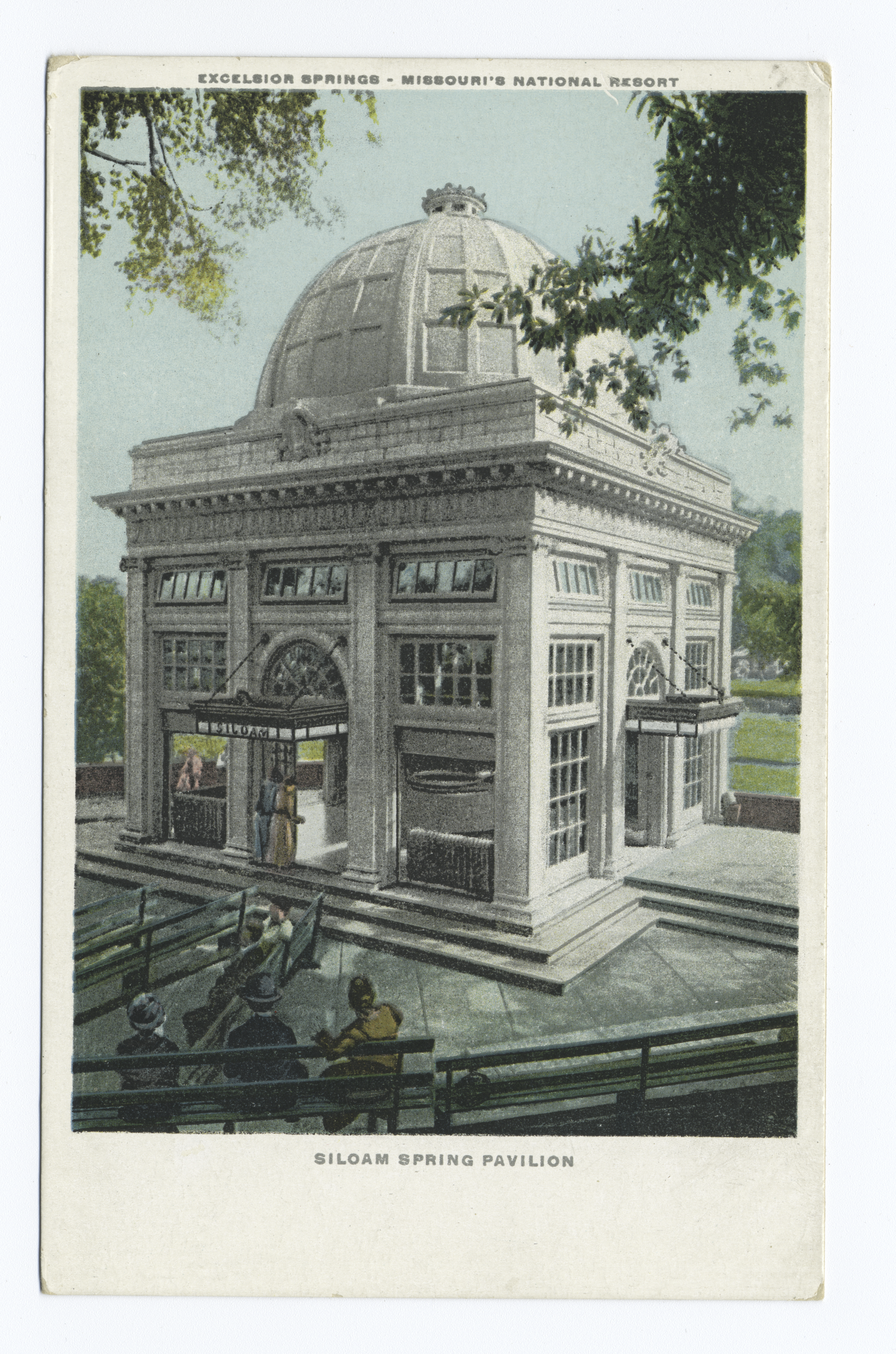
Siloam Spring Pavilion, early 20th century postcard

Discovery of new waters continued around the area. W.P. Mason of the Rensselaer Polytechnic Institute analyzed them. His finding reported the Siloam and Regent spring waters to have bicarbonates of iron and manganese, a rare combination that had only been found in four springs in the entire continent of Europe, and Excelsior Springs held the only two known in the United States. The rarity of having 20 separate mineral springs within the area gave Excelsior Springs the reputation of having the world's greatest collection of mineral waters.

Other minerals found in the springs were Saline-Sulphur, Soda-Bicarbonate, and Calcic-Bicarbonate (also known as Lithia). Mineral water resorts of the time rarely held such variety, most only mineral water baths, but Excelsior Springs held four distinct types of treatment within the region of tonic, alternative, and eliminative treatments, along with the mineral water baths. The city received international attention in 1893 at the Chicago's World Fair when medals were awarded for the iron-manganese water from the Regent Spring and Soterian ginger ale.

In October 1893, more train service was installed with the opening of the Sulpho-Saline route connecting to the Wabash Railroad. Fires destroyed the Excelsior Hotel and the Elms Hotel, leaving only boarding houses to take in visitors. Plans were soon drawn for the rebuilding of the Elms Hotel. The "Second" Elms Hotel was finished in 1908, but was soon destroyed again by fire. The third and present-day Elms Hotel was constructed in 1912. Also built were the Wholf's Tavern (later renamed Royal Hotel) and Snapp Hotel (later renamed Oaks Hotel). By 1909, the growing city had 14 modern hotels and about 200 boarding and rooming houses.

The development of a park system was approved, costing US$200,000 (equivalent to about $7,167,000 in 2025). This brought the Excelsior Springs Golf Course and the construction of many structures including the Masonic Hall, auditorium, Odd Fellows Building, and Morse buildings. Hourly transportation on the Kansas City interurban railroad began in January 1912. The expansion of public utilities and a system of highways connecting Excelsior Springs and Kansas City helped the city thrive.

=== 1930s to present day ===
The Great Depression did not have the impact on Excelsior Springs as it had on several other communities, surviving mostly due to its health resort status. Between 1930 and 1940, the town gained 370 citizens, reporting 4,800 total at the end of the decade, when populations in most other small towns were declining.

In November 1931, an intense gun battle happened at the historic Elms Hotel. Four robbers attempted to hold up the hotel, fled by automobile, and were followed by local law enforcement. Gunshots were exchanged in the hotel lobby and veranda. The four criminals fled to nearby Kansas City, but were later apprehended.

In 1932, Mafia gangster Lonnie Affronti shot Azalea Ross and her husband in an ambush shoot-out on Route 10. Ross was the chief witness in a narcotics trial against Affronti. The gangland aided in hiding Affronti for five years before he was captured in Brooklyn, New York, in 1937. One of his accomplices during the shootout, Charley Harvey, was apprehended and killed himself in the city jail a short time later.

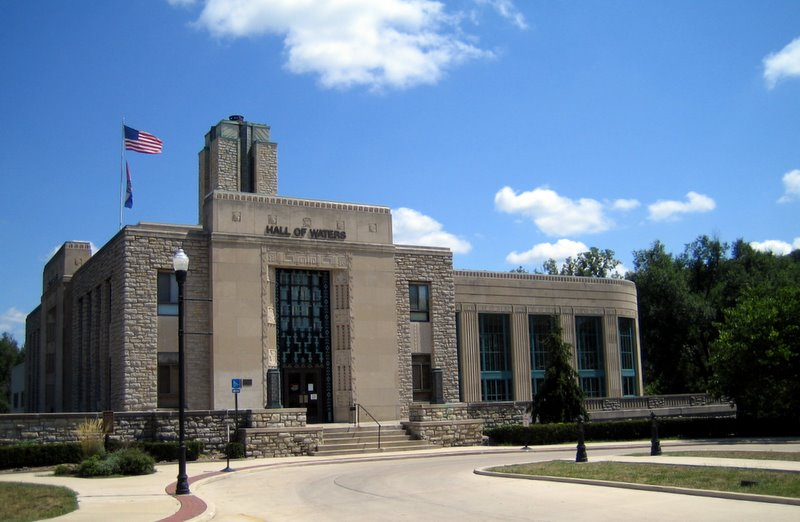
City Hall, or Hall of Waters

The present city hall, the Hall of Waters, was constructed between 1936 and 1938 by architects Keene & Simpson above the Siloam and Sulpho-Saline Springs. Citizens gathered on May 27, 1936, among national attention when the cornerstone of the Hall of Waters was lowered in place. CBS transmitted the event to 62 stations across the country. The local newspaper recorded many well-known names of the present time, including Hollywood B-movie actress Evalyn Knapp, artist Thomas Hart Benton, and author Homer Croy.

In 1937 the structure was partially complete, and the water bar in the lower level opened, providing mineral waters to health-seekers and visitors alike. In the following months the mineral water pool was opened, along with male and female hydrotherapy departments. A two-story hall had also been erected where the minerals were made available at fountains. The first floor contained the women's bath department, sunroom, covered porch, grand foyer, management office for the springs, and the chamber of commerce.

The swimming pool was large enough by standards for championship meets. In the south wing were the special hydrotherapy departments devoted to research for the waters' medicinal values. The bottling department was located on the east side of the north wing, which shipped five varieties of bottled mineral water to locations all over the world.

On Election Day 1948, Harry S. Truman spent the night at the Elms Hotel when it appeared that he was losing his re-election bid to Republican Thomas E. Dewey. However, in the early morning, he was awakened by his aides informing him that he had, in fact, won the election. He was whisked away to Kansas City. He later was photographed at Union Station in St. Louis holding a copy of the Chicago Tribune that famously mistakenly proclaimed "Dewey Defeats Truman".

Flooding issues in 1955 prompted construction of a dike, which resulted in the elimination of the stone terraces and walkways at Siloam Park, to protect the Hall of Waters from further flood damage by the nearby Fishing River. There were subsequent floods in the late 1960s, 1993, and 2015.

The late 1950s and early 1960s were difficult for the city due to the severe decline in popularity of the resort spa town. By 1967, the bottling operations had lost $25,000, and the city decided it was time to put its mineral water history behind and move forward. As of 2008, however, Excelsior Springs has licensed the rights to the mineral water to Excelsior Springs Bottling Company to allow for commercial bottling and distribution of the historic water.

The National Register of Historic Places includes the Elms Hotel, Hall of Waters, the Colonial Hotel, The Elms Historic District, Excelsior Springs Hall of Waters Commercial East Historic District, Excelsior Springs Hall of Waters Commercial West Historic District, First Methodist Church, Ligon Apartments, Watkins Mill, and Wyman School.

== Economy ==
Excelsior Springs has a renewed historic downtown district. Once blighted with empty buildings and numerous antique stores, there are now a quilt shop, an art store, and several small bistros alongside the old antique stores. It has two theaters: The Paradise Playhouse, with professional productions; and The Slightly Off-Broadway Theater, with local community theater productions.

== Education ==
It is in the Excelsior Springs 40 School District. Excelsior Springs School District #40 operates three elementary schools, one middle school, Excelsior Springs Tech. High School, Excelsior Springs High School, and Excelsior Springs Career Center.

Its public library is a branch of the Mid-Continent Public Library.

== Government ==
The city has its own police department.

== Notable people ==
- Hilary A. Bush, (1905–1966) Democratic Party politician who was Jackson County, Missouri prosecutor in the 1940s and 1950s and 37th Lieutenant Governor from 1961 to 1965.
- James Benton Grant (1848–1911), 3rd Governor of Colorado from 1883 to 1885, died in Excelsior Springs.
- Brenda Joyce (1917–2009), actress, born in Excelsior Springs, best known as playing "Jane" in five Tarzan movies between 1945 and 1949.
- Donald Judd (1928–1994), visual artist, born in Excelsior Springs.
- Shaun Marcum, (born 1981), Major League Baseball starting pitcher; raised in Excelsior Springs, he participated in high school baseball, football and wrestling.
- Tim Spehr, (born 1966), former catcher for the Montreal Expos and the Kansas City Royals.
- Lyle Waggoner, (1935–2020), actor, sculptor, cast member of Wonder Woman and The Carol Burnett Show, raised in Excelsior Springs.
- Gregg Williams (born 1958), football coach, Interim head coach and defensive coordinator of NFL's Cleveland Browns; born in Excelsior Springs, he started at quarterback on football team from 1973 to 1975 and also played high school baseball and basketball.

== In popular culture ==
The actor Michael Douglas had his second starring role in a movie, Adam at Six A.M., which was released in 1970. The movie was filmed in Excelsior Springs, and in Cameron, Missouri. In 1974, the National Civic League selected Excelsior Springs as an All-America City, reinvigorating this small town somewhat. The Greater Excelsior Springs Area conducted centennial celebrations in 1980.

== See also ==
- Hot Springs, Arkansas, a similar community in Arkansas with a history as a health resort, mobster hangout, and piece of US presidential history
- Tiffany Springs, an attempted competitor in the Kansas City metro
