= Ligon Apartments =

- U.S. National Register of Historic Places
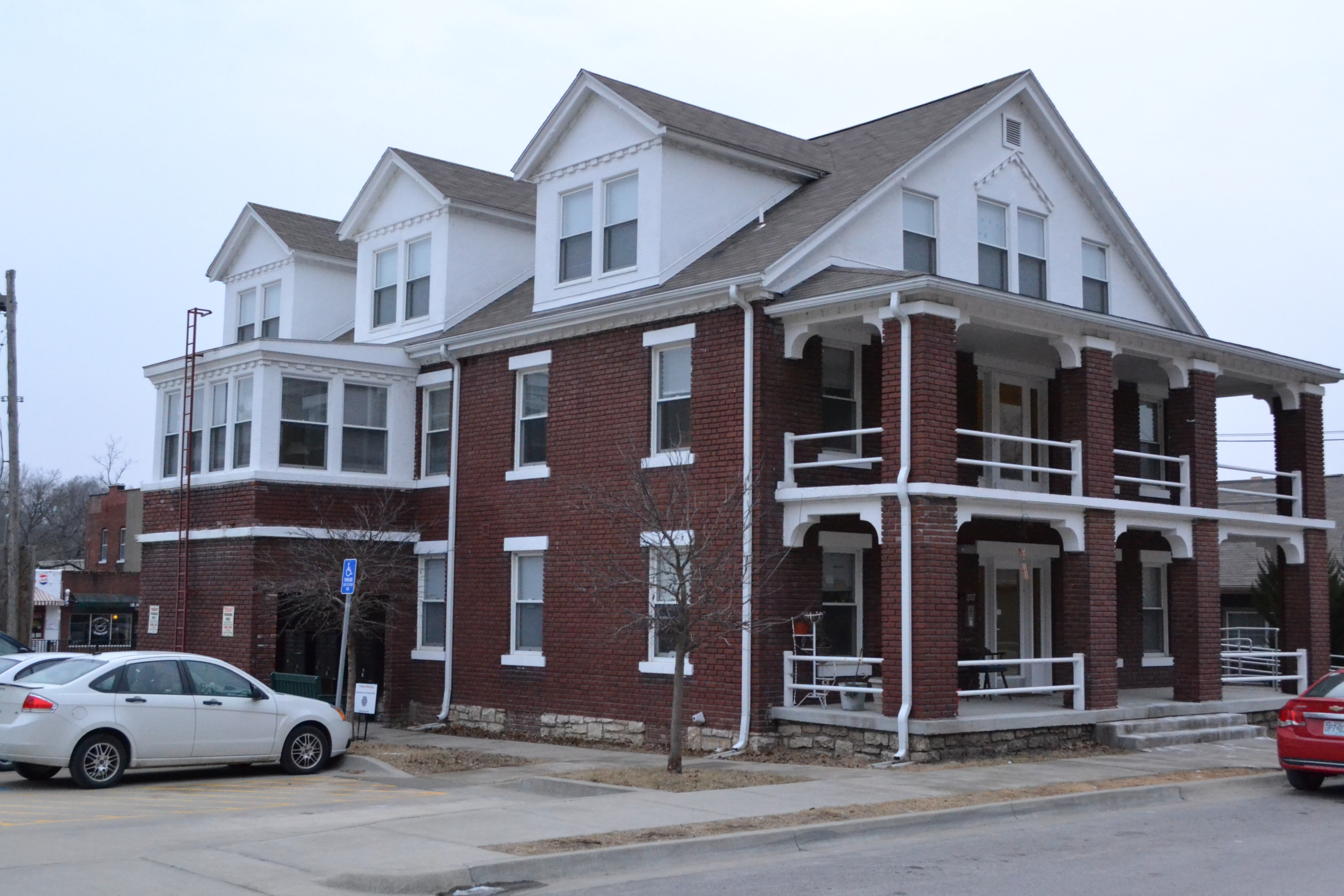

- Location within Missouri Location within the United States
- Location: 211 E Excelsior St, Excelsior Springs, Missouri
- Coordinates: 39°20′41″N 94°13′18″W
- Area: less than one acre
- Built: 1917
- Architectural style: Late 19th And 20th Century Revivals
- NRHP reference No.: 10000265
- Added to NRHP: May 17, 2010

Ligon Apartments, also known as Udell Apartments, is a historic apartment building located at Excelsior Springs, Clay County, Missouri. It was built in 1917, and is a 2 1/2-story, red brick colonnade apartment building. It features a two-story porch with a low pitched hipped roof supported by four square brick columns. The Ligon Apartments provided residential space for those visiting Excelsior Springs for an extended period of time in order to "take the waters" at the town's multiple mineral springs.

It was listed on the National Register of Historic Places in 2010.
