= Frank Hughes Memorial Library =

- U.S. National Register of Historic Places
- U.S. Historic district – Contributing property
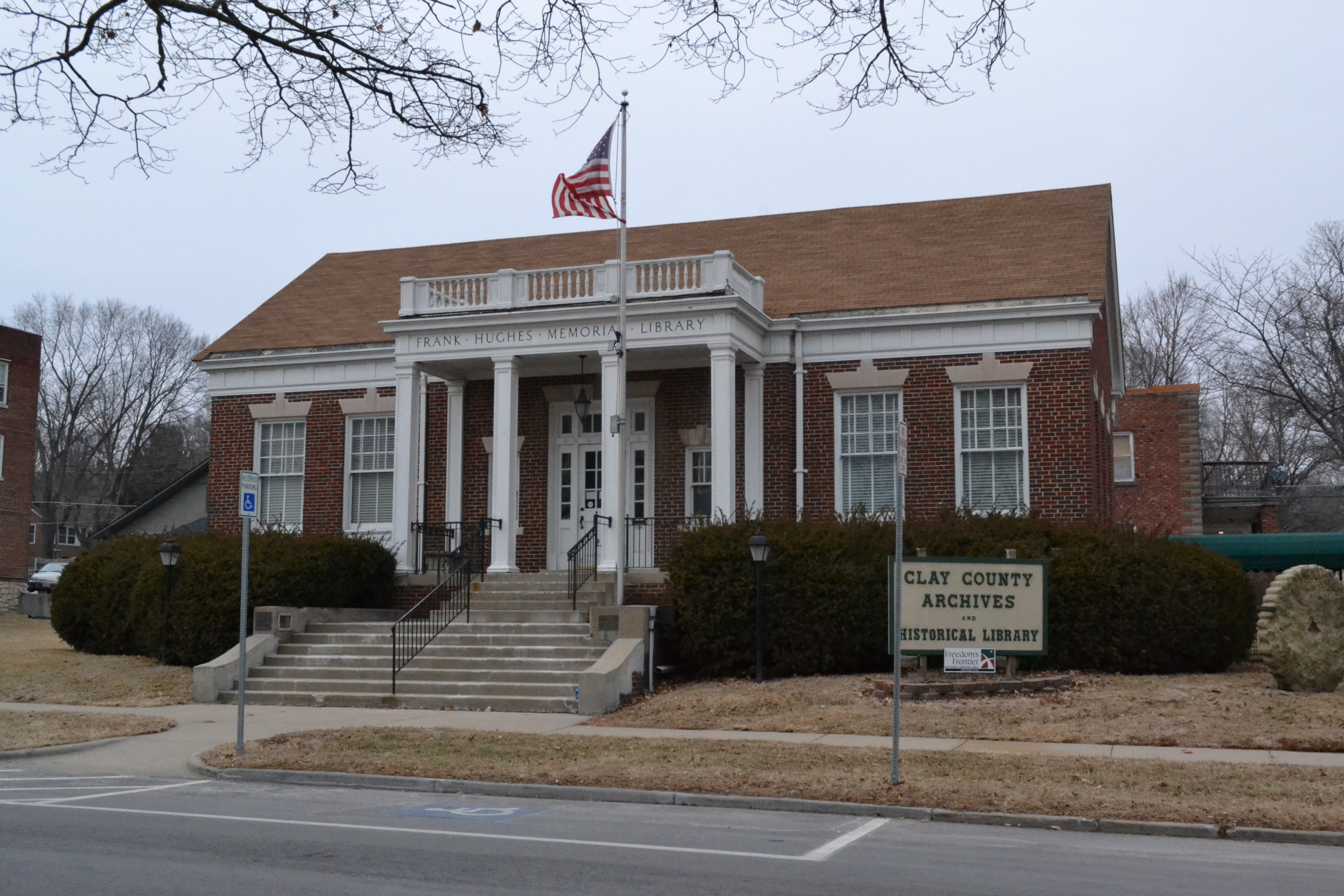

- Location within Missouri Location within the United States
- Location: 210 E. Franklin St., Liberty, Missouri
- Coordinates: 39°14′50″N 94°25′3″W
- Area: less than one acre
- Built: 1940
- Architect: Wight & Wight
- Architectural style: Classical Revival
- MPS: Liberty MPS
- NRHP reference No.: 92001676
- Added to NRHP: December 28, 1992

Frank Hughes Memorial Library is a historic library building located at Liberty, Clay County, Missouri. It was designed by the architectural firm Wight and Wight and built in 1940. It is a one-story, rectangular Classical Revival style brick building. It has a gable roof with a wide elaborate cornice. It features a flat-roofed portico feature a wide, simple wood entablature topped with a rooftop balustrade.

It was listed on the National Register of Historic Places in 1992. It is located in the Jewell-Lightburne Historic District.
