= Mid-Continent Public Library =

Public library system

- 39°06′42″N 94°23′30″W
- Location: Clay, Platte, and Jackson Counties, Missouri
- Established: 1965
- Branches: 34

Collection
- Size: 3.5 million items

Access and use
- Circulation: 10,217,438 (2023-2024 Fiscal year)
- Population served: 840,292

Other information
- Budget: $64 million (2024-2025 Fiscal Year)
- Director: Aaron B. Mason (2023)
- Website: mymcpl.org

Mid-Continent Public Library (MCPL), officially known as Consolidated Library District #3, is a public library system serving Clay, Jackson, and Platte Counties in Missouri, with headquarters in Independence, Missouri. Mid-Continent Public Library is the second-largest library system in the state of Missouri. Its collection ranks among the 50 largest in the nation.

Mid-Continent Public Library operates 34 branches across its three-county district, each offering a wide variety of materials and services to the public. Users can check out physical and electronic copies books, movies, music. Many locations also offer meeting and community rooms that can be reserved by the public at no charge.

The library system is overseen by a Library Board of twelve members, four appointed by County Commissioners in each of the service region's three counties.

== History ==
The Independence Public Library was formed by the Independence Library Association in 1892 and by the creation of the Citizens Improvement Association Library (later the Carnegie Library) in Excelsior Springs, Missouri in the 1890s.

After World War II, Clay, Platte, and Jackson counties each formed library systems. They began collaborating in the early 1960s, and on November 10, 1965, Clay and Jackson formed the Mid-Continent Public Library Service as a joint administrative body, though each library retained separate governing boards and budgets.

Even though they remained separate, their combined resources allowed them to merge administrative costs. Gaining the name Mid-Continent Public Library in 1965, the library system was well on its way to achieving its goal. Separating library services from school districts enabled them to expand library services to rural areas, which did not have services at that time.

Platte County joined the group in 1968. In 1978, seven years after the state legislature passed a law allowing for consolidated multi-county library systems, the Clay and Jackson libraries officially merged to form Consolidated Library District No. 3. Platte County joined a year later.

Librarian James A. Leathers was influential in the creation of a regional library system and became the first Director of Mid-Continent Public Library Service.

=== MCPL Workers United ===
On March 19th, 2026 workers at MCPL announced their intent to unionize on social media. On May 27th, eligible employees in the bargaining unit voted 436 to 164 to join the Communications Workers of America (CWA) Local 6360. MCPL has more than 700 eligible employees, making MCPL Workers United the largest library workers' union in Missouri. This is the second union of its kind in Missouri after Daniel Boone Regional Library Workers United formed in May of 2022.

=== Capital improvement plan ===
Since the formation of Mid-Continent Public Library in 1965, the district’s population across its three counties has grown exponentially. To accommodate growing need, the Library increased its property tax levy to fund building improvements in 1983 and again in 2016, both approved by voters in the district.

In the 1980s and 1990s, many of the Library’s branches were updated, and in 2018, the Library began to execute a new Capital Improvement Plan to upgrade its 32 branches and add two new ones. In 2024, MCPL finished the last project in its plan, concluding the years-long, multi-million-dollar project, which upgraded, renovated, or replaced each one of its current locations and added the East Independence Branch and East Lee’s Summit Branch to the system.

== Mid-Continent Public Library specialty services ==
=== Midwest Genealogy Center ===
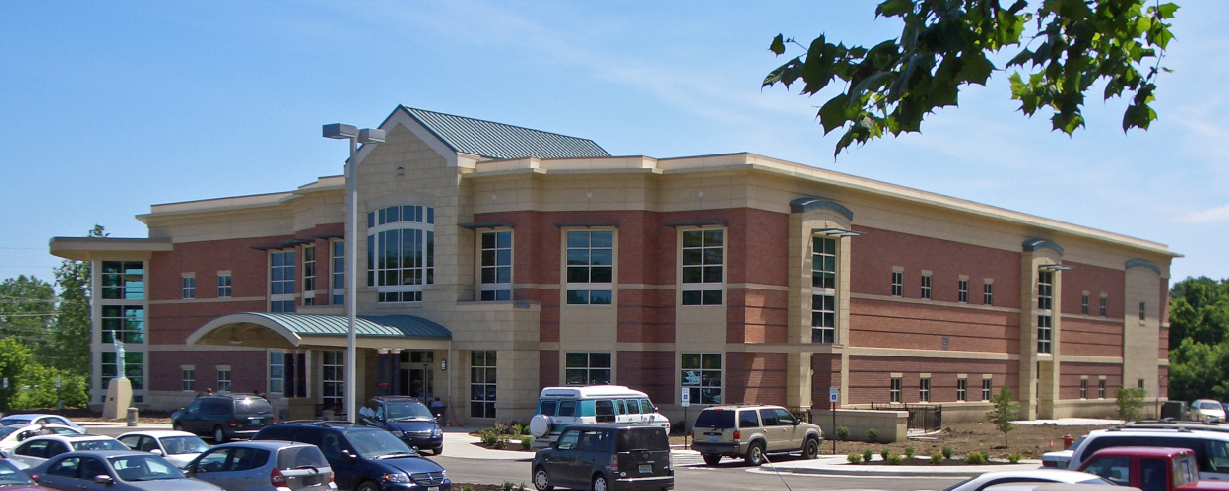
Midwest Genealogy Center, Independence, Missouri

On June 21, 2008, Mid-Continent Public Library opened the Midwest Genealogy Center (MGC) in Independence, Missouri. It is the largest stand-alone public genealogy research facility in America. The 52,000-square-foot building houses a collection of records in almost completely open stacks. It holds tens of thousands of records both in person and online, including newspapers, microfiche, plat maps, census records, city directories, and much more.

In 2019, the Conference Center at MGC opened, offering a community space with divisible rooms for larger meetings, seminars, receptions, trainings, and special functions. At maximum capacity, the Conference Center can host up to 400 people and is available for public reservation.

=== Square One Small Business Center ===
Launched in 2014 and funded in part by the Kauffman Foundation, MCPL’s Square One Small Business Center strives to support local entrepreneurs and job seekers by providing educational programs and one-on-one support. Square One staff provide career and business support at their home offices at MCPL’s Colbern Road Library Center as well as the rest of the Library’s locations.

=== The Story Center ===
The Story Center at Mid-Continent Public Library is dedicated to helping customers create and share their stories and connect with the stories of others. The Center offers a variety of educational workshops for storytellers, including their Written and Oral Storytelling Certification series. Story Center staff also manage Woodneath Press, the Library’s publishing imprint, which publishes the work of local writers.

=== MCPL Culinary Kitchens ===
Based in MCPL’s Green Hills Library Center, the Culinary Kitchens at Mid-Continent Public Library is home to a teaching kitchen that offers educational food programs as well as multiple permitted commercial kitchens that current and aspiring food business owners can use to create their products. The Culinary Kitchens opened to the public in summer of 2023 and hosts free food classes for people of all ages.

=== Reading Rocket ===
Mid-Continent Public Library’s Reading Rocket is a family literacy outreach vehicle that takes Library services and resources beyond MCPL branches and out into the community. The Rocket team regularly visits areas in the MCPL district with limited public transportation to ensure all families have access to literacy services, such as storytimes and free books to help grow children’s home libraries.

== Awards and Accolades ==
On May 8, 2014, the Mid-Continent Public Library received the National Medal for Museum and Library Service during a ceremony at the White House in Washington D.C. The medal is the country's highest honor awarded by the Institute of Museum and Library Services.

MCPL’s individual branches and specialty services have been recognized for a variety of accomplishments by regional and local organizations, including a Missouri Preservation Honor Award in 2023 for the restoration and transformation of the historic home on the Woodneath Library Center campus, which now serves as offices for MCPL’s Story Center initiative.
