= Excelsior Springs Hall of Waters Commercial East Historic District =

Historic district in Missouri, United States

- U.S. National Register of Historic Places
- U.S. Historic district
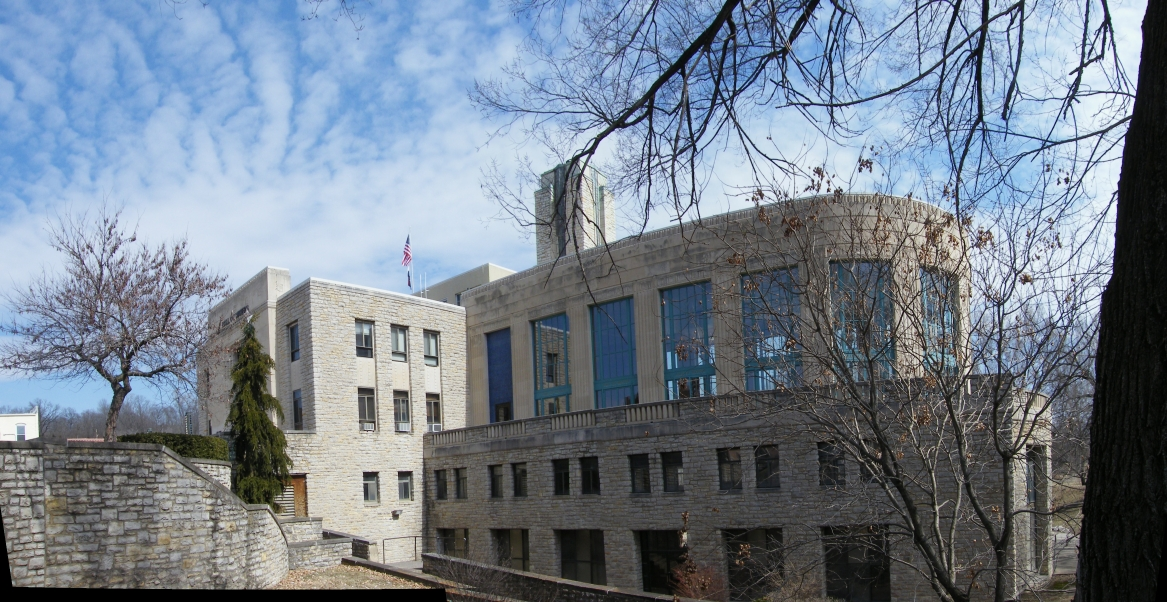
- Hall of Waters, March 2010

- Location within Missouri Location within the United States
- Location: Roughly along portions of East and West Broadway and Main St., Excelsior Springs, Missouri
- Coordinates: 39°20′39″N 94°13′19″W
- Area: 7 acres (2.8 ha)
- Architect: Curtiss, Louis S.
- Architectural style: Late Victorian, Late 19th And 20th Century Revivals, et al.
- NRHP reference No.: 99000638
- Added to NRHP: May 27, 1999

Excelsior Springs Hall of Waters Commercial East Historic District is a national historic district located at Excelsior Springs, Clay County, Missouri. It encompasses 24 contributing buildings and 2 contributing structures in the central business district of Excelsior Springs. The district developed between about 1894 and 1948 and includes representative examples of Victorian architecture. The central feature of the district, the separately listed Hall of Waters, is a five level, Art Deco / Depression Modern style reinforced concrete building. Other notable buildings include the Flanders Dry Goods Store (c. 1900-1905), A.M. Howard Drug Store (1905-1909), Clay County State Bank (1906), The Huey Building (1908), Oriental Bazaar Gift Store (1908), The Excelsior Baths and Broadway Rooms (c. 1913-1922), Fraternal Order of Eagles Lodge Hall (c. 1905-1909), The Kennedy Building (1902), First National Bank Building (c. 1900-1905), The Francis Hotel (c. 1905–1909, c. 1917-1922), and The Auditorium (c. 1905-1909).

It was listed on the National Register of Historic Places in 1999.
