= Charles Clinton Stone Row House =

Historic house in Tonopah, Nevada, U.S.

- U.S. National Register of Historic Places
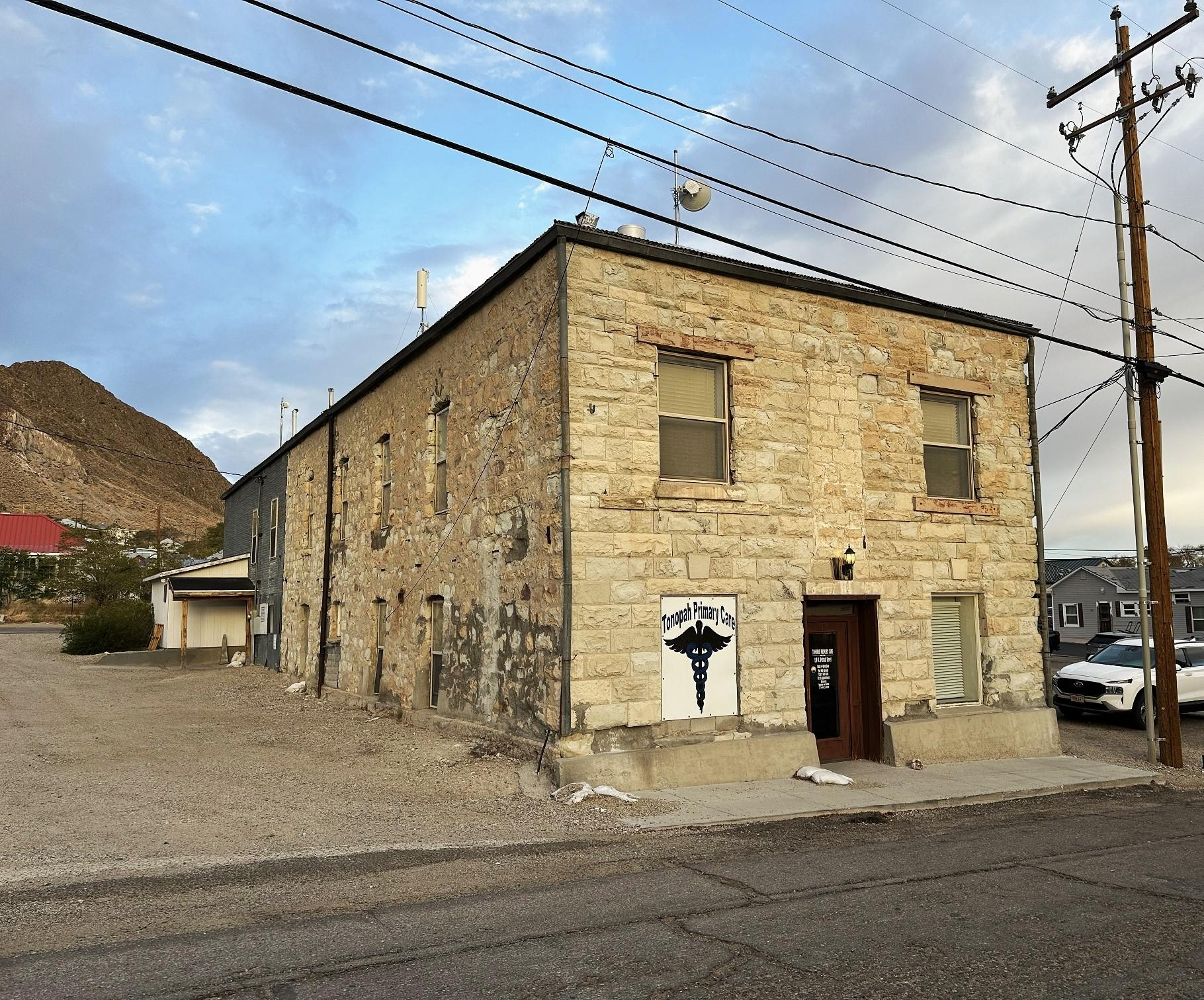
- Location: 151 Central, Tonopah, Nevada
- Area: less than one acre
- Built: 1905
- Built by: Clinton, Charles
- MPS: Tonopah MRA
- NRHP reference No.: 82003225
- Added to NRHP: May 20, 1982

The Charles Clinton Stone Row House is a stone row house located at 151 Central Street in Tonopah, Nevada, United States. Charles Clinton built the house in 1905 to use as a boarding house. The building's plan, designed to fit a narrow plot of land, features a series of rooms connected by an inside corridor. The house was built in ashlar stone and is topped by a hipped roof. After its use as a boarding house, the building served as a hospital.

The building was added to the National Register of Historic Places on May 20, 1982.
