= Missouri City Savings Bank Building and Meeting Hall =

- U.S. National Register of Historic Places
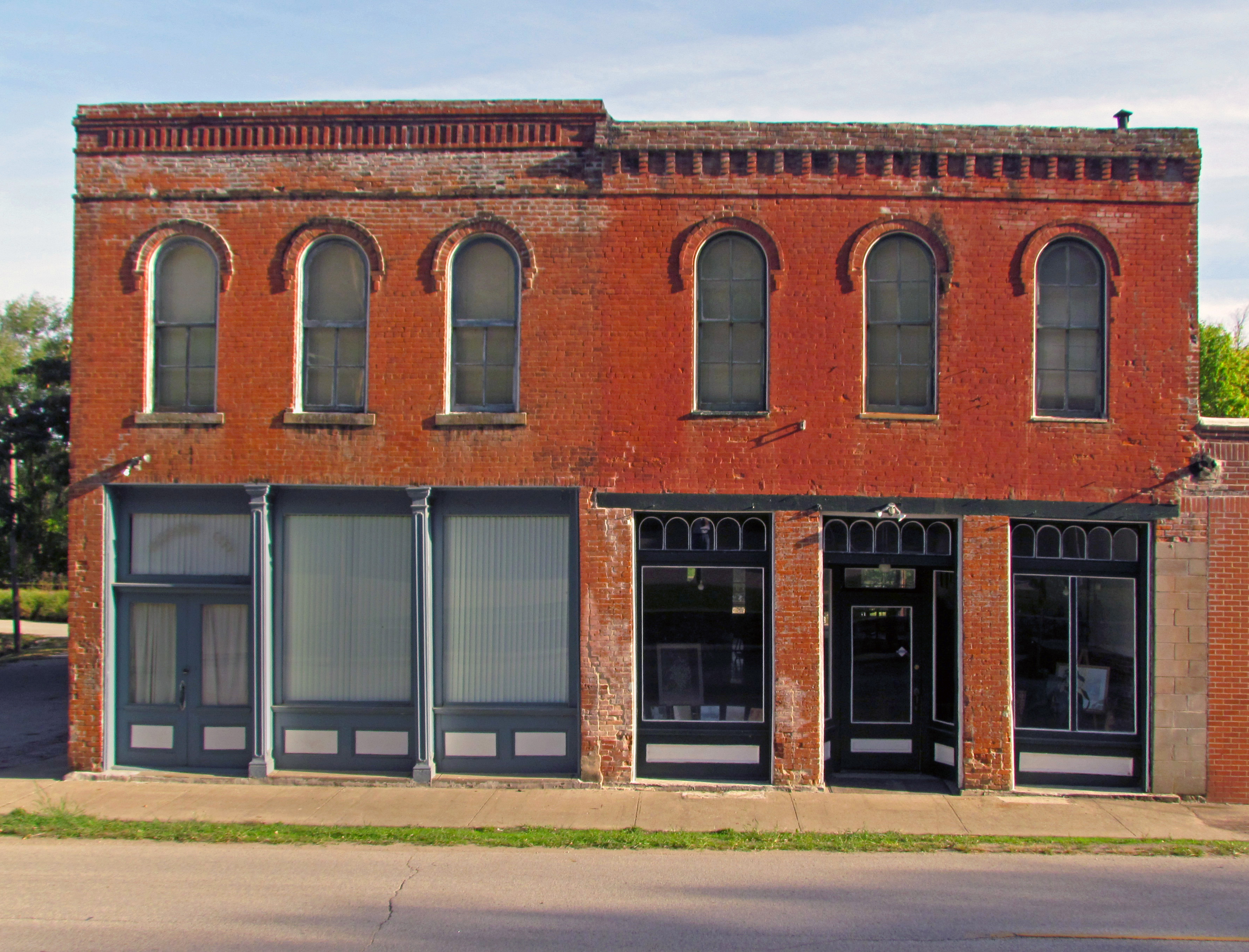
- Missouri City Savings Bank Building and Meeting Hall, September 2012

- Location within Missouri Location within the United States
- Location: 417-419 Main St., Missouri City, Missouri
- Coordinates: 39°14′18″N 94°17′39″W
- Area: less than one acre
- Built: c. 1858
- NRHP reference No.: 10000507
- Added to NRHP: July 30, 2010

Missouri City Savings Bank Building and Meeting Hall, also known as the Nowlin Store Building, is a historic commercial building located in Missouri City, Clay County, Missouri. Built circa 1858, it is the oldest and largest remaining commercial structure in Missouri City, featuring shops on the first level and private spaces on the second. It was named to the National Register of Historic Places in 2010.
