= Clinton House (Liberty, Missouri) =

Historic house in Missouri, United States

- U.S. National Register of Historic Places
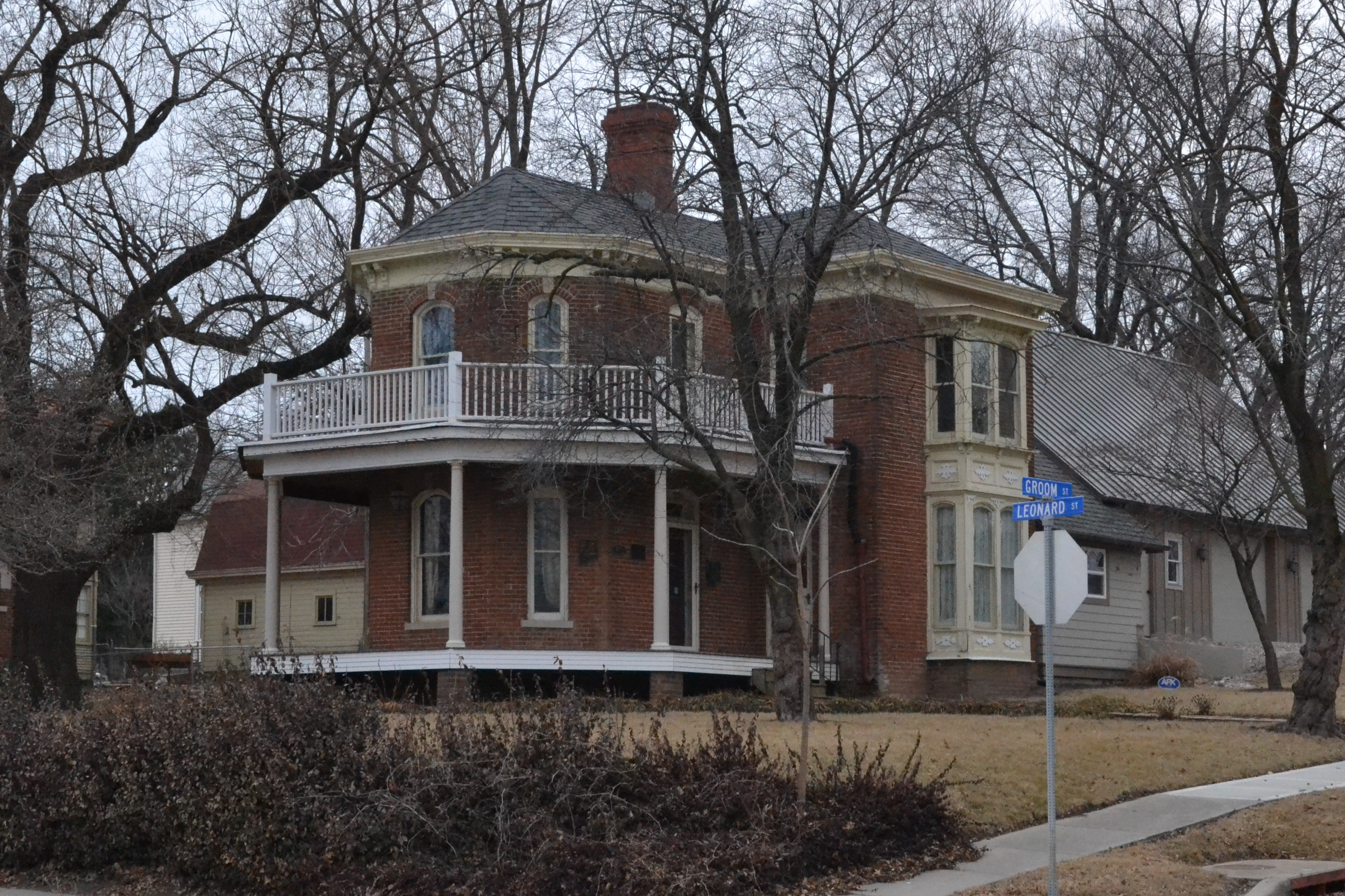

- Location within Missouri Location within the United States
- Location: 404 S. Leonard St., Liberty, Missouri
- Coordinates: 39°14′23″N 94°25′0″W
- Area: 1 acre (0.40 ha)
- Built: c. 1889
- NRHP reference No.: 78001641
- Added to NRHP: November 22, 1978

The Clinton House is a historic home located at Liberty, Clay County, Missouri at 404 S. Leonard Street. It was built in 1875 in the Italianate Asymmetrical style. The house consists of a two-story polygonal wing attached to a rectangular wing. The two-story veranda with railed porch and entrances for cross ventilation reflects a Southern influence. Interesting features include the stone-incised fluer-de-lis keystones. Source: Liberty's Living Legacy – 19th Century Houses and Buildings 1820 – 1899 Written by: Christopher Harris c. 2004

It was listed on the National Register of Historic Places in 1978.
