= The Elms Hotel and Spa =

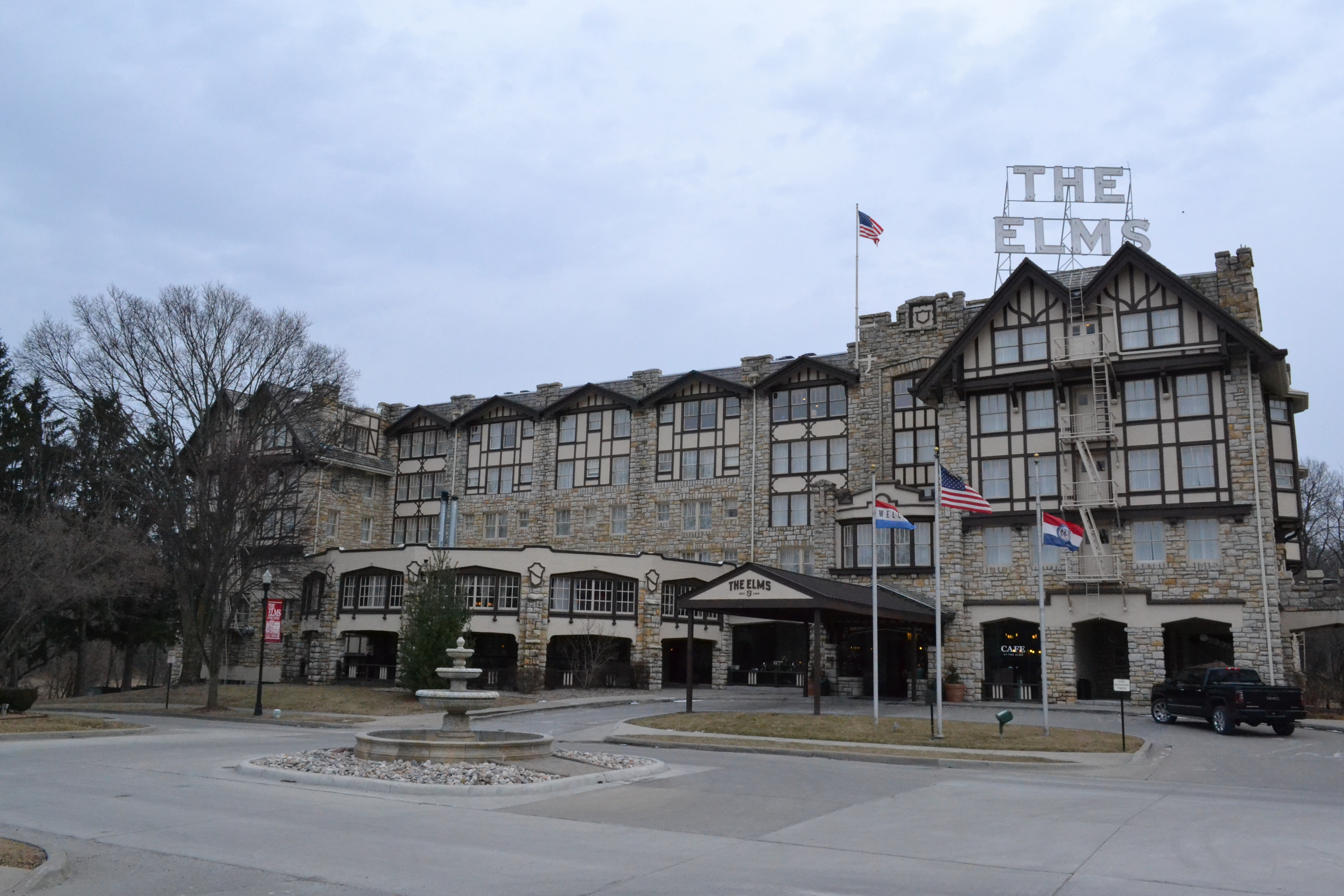
- The Elms Hotel and Spa

General information
- Location: Excelsior Springs, Missouri, Regent and Elms Boulevard

Website
- http://www.elmshotelandspa.com
- The Elms Hotel and Spa
- U.S. National Register of Historic Places
- U.S. Historic district – Contributing property
- Location within Missouri Location within the United States
- Coordinates: 39°20′14″N 94°13′32″W
- Built: 1912
- Architects: Jackson & McIlvain
- Architectural style: Tudor Revival, Gothic Revival
- NRHP reference No.: 85000648
- Added to NRHP: March 29, 1985

The Elms Hotel and Spa is a historic resort hotel at Regent and Elms Boulevard in Excelsior Springs, Missouri. It is listed on the National Register of Historic Places. It is located in The Elms Historic District.

== History ==
The first Elms Hotel on the site was a 200-room resort opened in July 1888. An annex with 75 additional rooms was added a year later, in 1889. It was destroyed by fire after less than ten years in operation, on May 9, 1898.

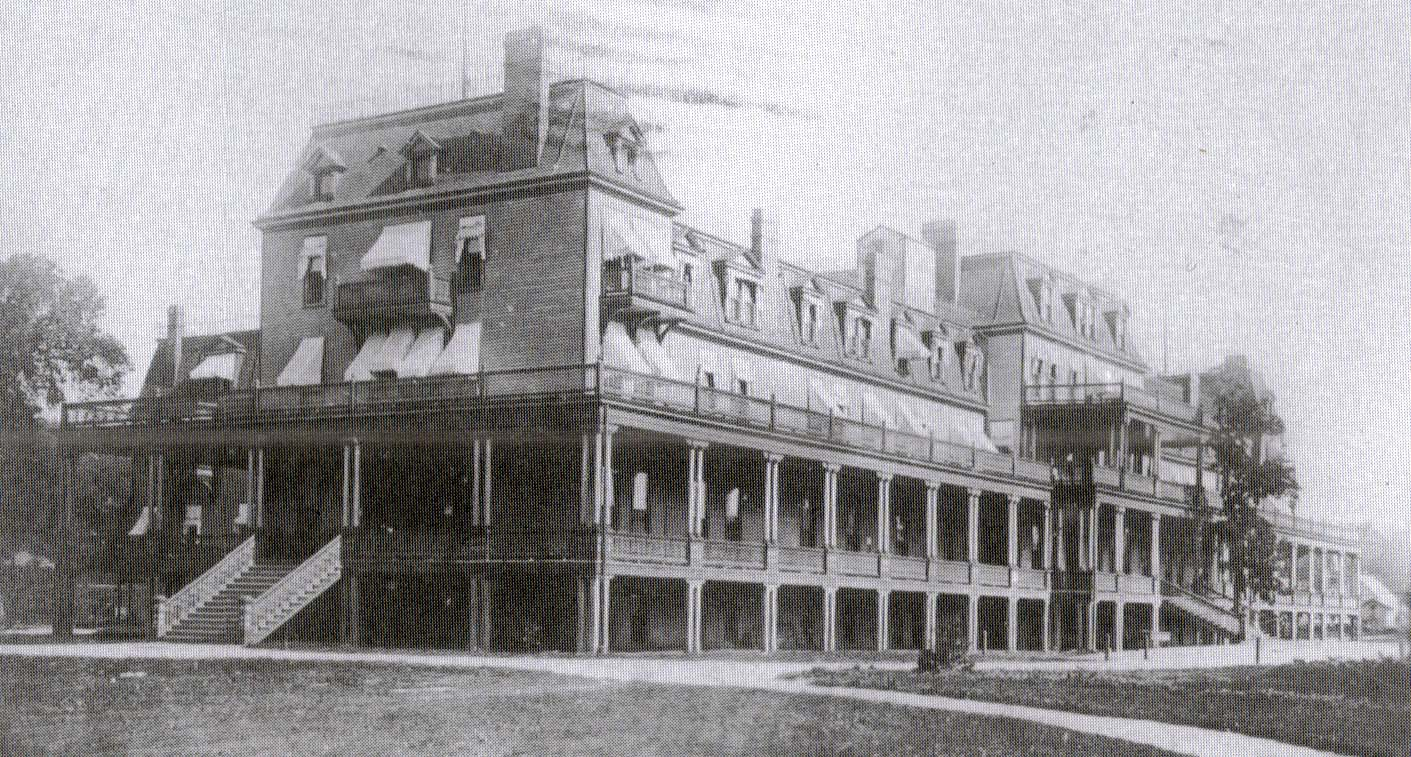
First Elms Hotel, 1890s

The second Elms Hotel was a 300-room hotel that opened on July 31, 1909. It was also destroyed by fire, just over a year later, on October 30, 1910.

The current Elms Hotel was built of native stone by the Elms Realty Company and opened on September 7, 1912. During the 1920s and 30s the region around Kansas City, Missouri was a "wide open town" under crime boss "Big City" Tom Pendergast. The Elms prospered as a speakeasy, and Al Capone was a frequent visitor. In 1922 the original owner, the Elms Realty Company, sold the hotel to Dr. A. S. McCleary, operator of a Kansas City sanitarium. McCleary sold the hotel in 1925 to the Roberts Hotel Company of Chicago.

In 1932 the American Medical Association released research studies which stated that there was no scientific evidence supporting the claimed health benefits of mineral water, and that same year the hotel was declared bankrupt and was purchased by the Eppley Hotel Company chain.

In 1948, Harry S. Truman spent election night at the hotel. After Truman predicted victory to his staffers at his headquarters at the Muehlebach Hotel in Kansas City, he then went to the Elms, avoiding the attention drawn to his home in Independence. In the morning he was awakened with the news he had won the election.

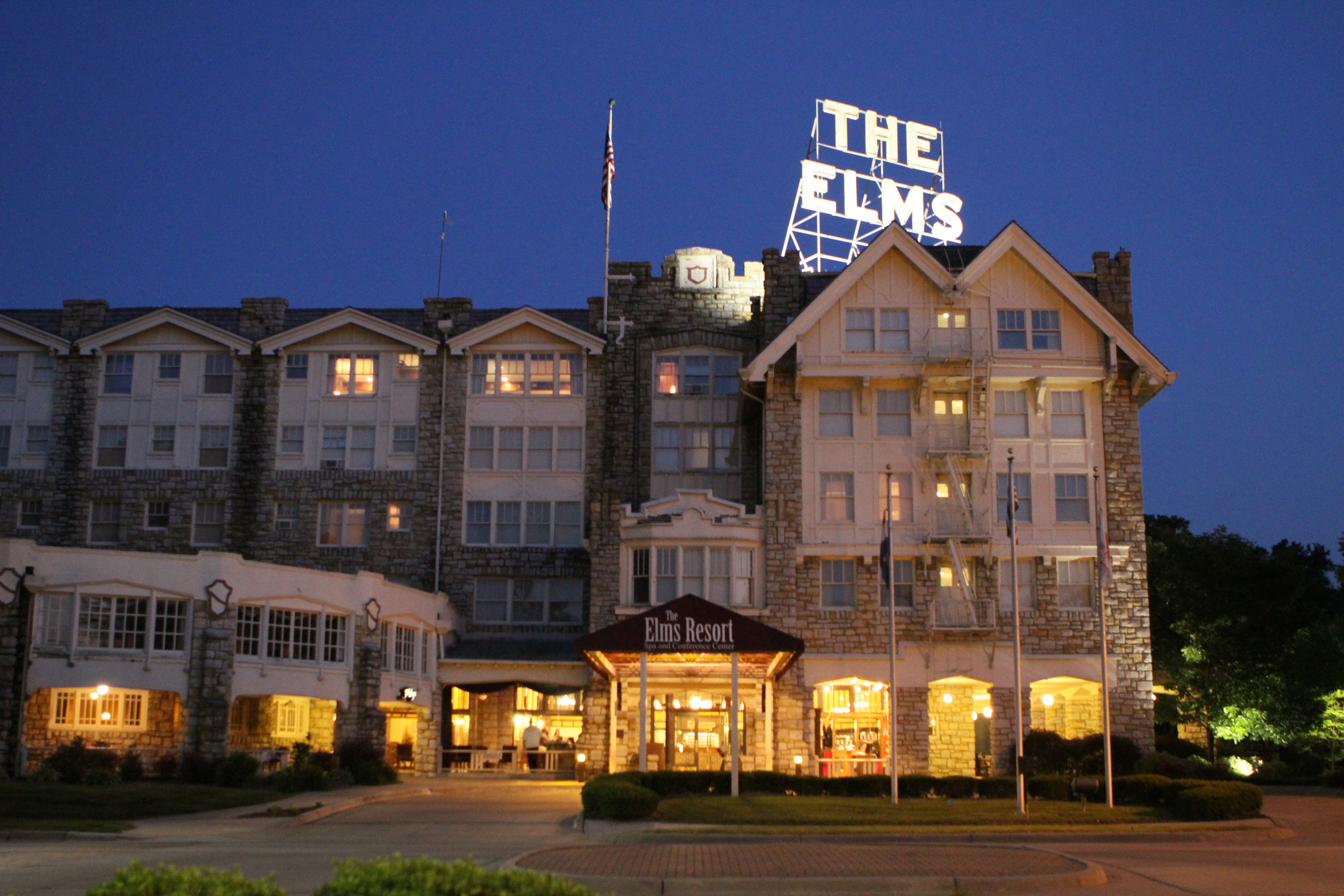
Elms Hotel at night (2011).

Throughout its history, the hotel has been the site of other notable activities, including serving as a training camp for boxer Jack Dempsey, and as the summer camp for the 1948 New York Giants football team.

The hotel's sale in 1956 from the Eppley chain to the Sheraton Corporation was part of the second largest hotel sale in United States history. Sheraton quickly sold the hotel again, only to rebuy it in 1960 when it went bankrupt, renaming it the Sheraton-Elms Hotel. Sheraton sold the Elms, along with seventeen other aging properties, to Gotham Hotels in 1968 and it regained its original name. It remained open until 1971. After a number years of closure, it was bought by local citizens and reopened in 1977.

In 1991 the hotel again went bankrupt, but continued to operate. The city of Excelsior Springs bought the hotel in 1995 and transitioned it to new owners, who renovated the hotel in 1998 at a cost of $16 million. The hotel closed in 2011 for another renovation, costing $20 million. It reopened in 2012, celebrating its centennial. It was sold yet again to Hilton properties in 2019, and it is scheduled for more renovations in 2021.
