= Missouri City, Missouri =

City in Clay County, Missouri, United States

- City
- City Hall (Originally a Methodist church)

- Location of Missouri City, Missouri
- Coordinates: 39°14′18″N 94°18′10″W
- Country: United States
- State: Missouri
- County: Clay

Area
  - Total: 1.10 sq mi (2.84 km^{2})
  - Land: 1.10 sq mi (2.84 km^{2})
  - Water: 0 sq mi (0.00 km^{2})
- Elevation: 892 ft (272 m)

Population (2020)
  - Total: 217
  - Density: 197.9/sq mi (76.41/km^{2})
- Time zone: UTC-6 (Central (CST))
  - Summer (DST): UTC-5 (CDT)
- ZIP code: 64072
- Area code: 816
- FIPS code: 29-48980
- GNIS feature ID: 2395355
- Website: missouricitymo.gov

Missouri City is a city in Clay County, Missouri, United States. The population was 217 at the 2020 census. It is part of the Kansas City metropolitan area.

== History ==
Missouri City was originally named Atchison. The earliest known use of the name was on a deed to a building from 1820. The land was possessed by French fur traders Antoine Laffond and Bernard Laffond as early as January 24, 1807. The name had changed to Missouri City by December 5, 1857.

A special charter town of about 600 inhabitants on the Missouri River, in Clay County, six miles from Liberty. The Wabash Railroad runs through it. The beginning of the place was in Williams' Landing, and a ferry established by a man named Shrewsbury Williams, at the mouth of Rose's branch, about the year 1834. About 1846 there were a dozen houses in the place and it was called Richfield. Some time later a bar formed opposite the landing and a stock company laid off a town below which they called St. Bernard. Later still another town was laid off and called New Richfield, and not long after another town was laid off and called Atchison. In 1859 St. Bernard, Richfield and Atchison were incorporated as Missouri City. There was at one time a tobacco factory in the place, and a large quantity of hemp was shipped from there. During the Civil War it was the prey of bushwhackers and jayhawkers, and its business was almost entirely destroyed, but since the building of the Wabash Railroad a considerable business has been attracted to it.

— Howard Louis Conard, Encyclopedia of the History of Missouri (1901)

The Missouri City Savings Bank Building and Meeting Hall was listed on the National Register of Historic Places in 2010.

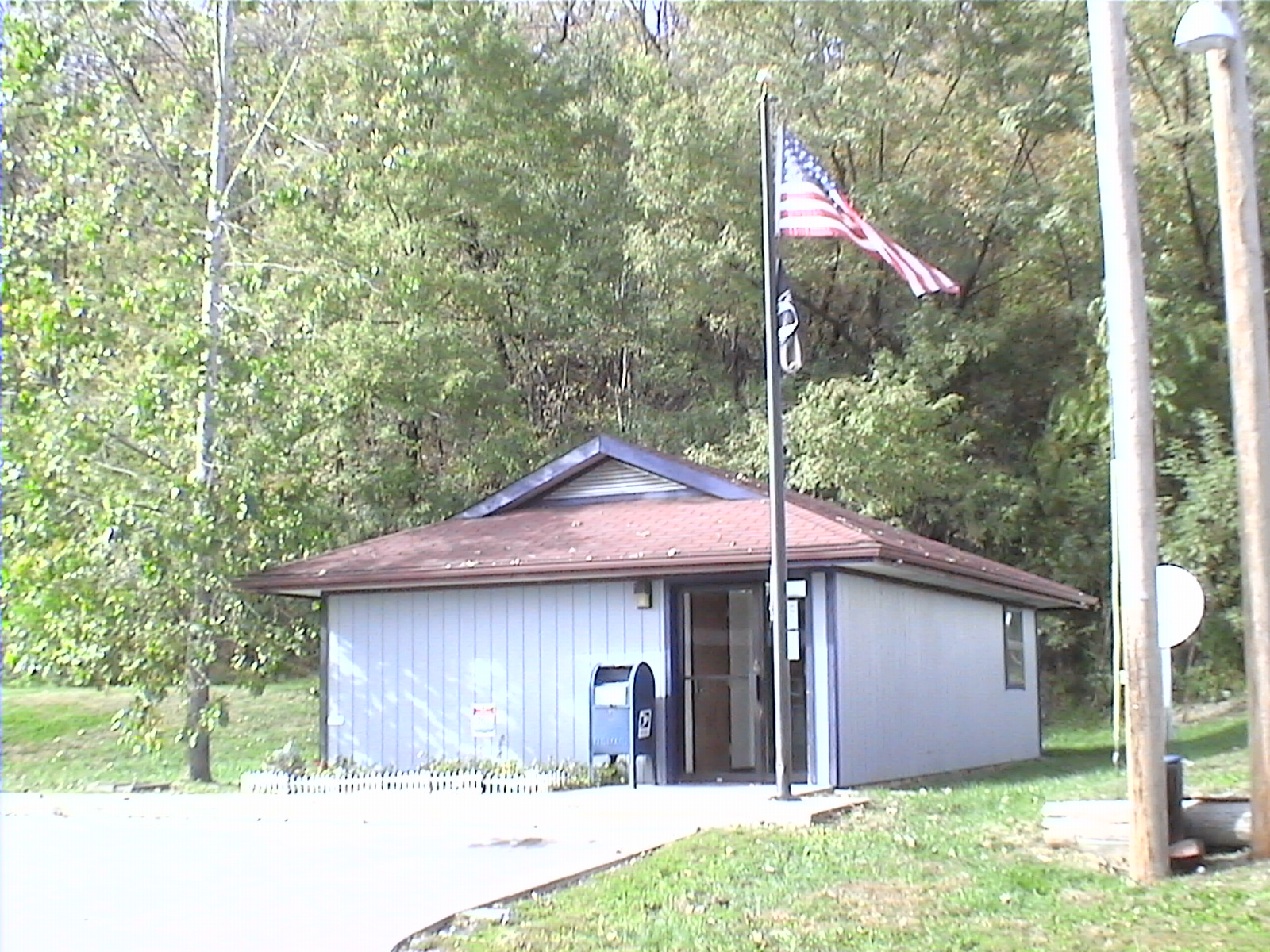
Missouri City Post Office

== Geography ==
According to the United States Census Bureau, the city has a total area of 1.14 square miles (2.95 km^{2}), of which 1.01 square miles (2.62 km^{2}) is land and 0.13 square miles (0.34 km^{2}) is water.

== Demographics ==
Historical population
Census	Pop.	Note	%±
1860	480		—
1870	572		19.2%
1880	581		1.6%
1890	422		−27.4%
1900	398		−5.7%
1910	559		40.5%
1920	292		−47.8%
1930	376		28.8%
1940	323		−14.1%
1950	314		−2.8%
1960	404		28.7%
1970	375		−7.2%
1980	343		−8.5%
1990	348		1.5%
2000	295		−15.2%
2010	267		−9.5%
2020	217		−18.7%
U.S. Decennial Census

=== Racial and ethnic composition ===
Missouri City city, Missouri – Racial and ethnic composition Note: the US Census treats Hispanic/Latino as an ethnic category. This table excludes Latinos from the racial categories and assigns them to a separate category. Hispanics/Latinos may be of any race.
Race / Ethnicity (NH = Non-Hispanic)	Pop 2000	Pop 2010	Pop 2020	% 2000	% 2010	% 2020
White alone (NH)	276	235	185	93.56%	88.01%	85.25%
Black or African American alone (NH)	8	11	0	2.71%	4.12%	0.00%
Native American or Alaska Native alone (NH)	0	2	3	0.00%	0.75%	1.38%
Asian alone (NH)	0	1	3	0.00%	0.37%	1.38%
Native Hawaiian or Pacific Islander alone (NH)	0	0	0	0.00%	0.00%	0.00%
Other race alone (NH)	0	0	2	0.00%	0.00%	0.92%
Mixed race or Multiracial (NH)	11	12	22	3.73%	4.49%	10.14%
Hispanic or Latino (any race)	0	6	2	0.00%	2.25%	0.92%
Total	295	267	217	100.00%	100.00%	100.00%

=== 2010 census ===
As of the census of 2010, there were 267 people, 116 households, and 68 families residing in the city. The population density was 264.4 inhabitants per square mile (102.1/km^{2}). There were 133 housing units at an average density of 131.7 per square mile (50.8/km^{2}). The racial makeup of the city was 89.9% White, 4.1% African American, 0.7% Native American, 0.4% Asian, and 4.9% from two or more races. Hispanic or Latino of any race were 2.2% of the population.

There were 116 households, of which 25.9% had children under the age of 18 living with them, 44.0% were married couples living together, 5.2% had a female householder with no husband present, 9.5% had a male householder with no wife present, and 41.4% were non-families. 31.0% of all households were made up of individuals, and 9.5% had someone living alone who was 65 years of age or older. The average household size was 2.30 and the average family size was 2.79.

The median age in the city was 46.2 years. 17.6% of residents were under the age of 18; 8.6% were between the ages of 18 and 24; 21.7% were from 25 to 44; 38.9% were from 45 to 64; and 13.1% were 65 years of age or older. The gender makeup of the city was 54.3% male and 45.7% female.

=== 2000 census ===
As of the census of 2000, there were 295 people, 110 households, and 75 families residing in the city. The population density was 290.5 inhabitants per square mile (112.2/km^{2}). There were 120 housing units at an average density of 118.2 per square mile (45.6/km^{2}). The racial makeup of the city was 93.56% White, 2.71% African American, and 3.73% from two or more races.

There were 110 households, out of which 29.1% had children under the age of 18 living with them, 52.7% were married couples living together, 8.2% had a female householder with no husband present, and 31.8% were non-families. 23.6% of all households were made up of individuals, and 7.3% had someone living alone who was 65 years of age or older. The average household size was 2.68 and the average family size was 3.23.

In the city the population was spread out, with 26.1% under the age of 18, 8.1% from 18 to 24, 29.8% from 25 to 44, 26.8% from 45 to 64, and 9.2% who were 65 years of age or older. The median age was 37 years. For every 100 females, there were 121.8 males. For every 100 females age 18 and over, there were 107.6 males.

The median income for a household in the city was $41,875, and the median income for a family was $45,000. Males had a median income of $30,357 versus $24,554 for females. The per capita income for the city was $17,693. About 4.2% of families and 7.6% of the population were below the poverty line, including 9.1% of those under the age of eighteen and none of those 65 or over.

== Education ==
It is in the Missouri City 56 School District, an elementary school district.

== See also ==
- List of cities in Missouri
