= National Register of Historic Places listings in Osage County, Kansas =

Location of Osage County in Kansas

This is a list of the National Register of Historic Places listings in Osage County, Kansas.

This is intended to be a complete list of the properties and districts on the National Register of Historic Places in Osage County, Kansas, United States. The locations of National Register properties and districts for which the latitude and longitude coordinates are included below, may be seen in a map.

There are 15 properties and districts listed on the National Register in the county.

This National Park Service list is complete through NPS recent listings posted May 1, 2026.

== Current listings ==
	Name on the Register	Image	Date listed	Location	City or town	Description
1	Arvonia School	Arvonia School	July 3, 2012 (#12000387)	S. Arvonia Rd. 38°28′42″N 95°52′15″W	Lebo	One of Kansas' earliest architect-designed schools, built in 1872.
2	Arvonia Township Hall	Arvonia Township Hall	January 11, 2017 (#100000516)	S. Arvonia Rd. 38°28′49″N 95°52′10″W	Lebo	
3	Atchison, Topeka, and Santa Fe Pratt Truss Bridge	Atchison, Topeka, and Santa Fe Pratt Truss Bridge	May 9, 2003 (#03000364)	SE Pine St., 0.1 miles (0.16 km) south of intersection with E. Emporia St. 38°30′19″N 95°38′07″W	Melvern	
4	Banner Hereford Farm	Banner Hereford Farm	June 12, 1998 (#98000659)	19355 S. Berryton Rd. 38°42′56″N 95°38′31″W	Scranton	
5	Calvinistic Methodist Church	Calvinistic Methodist Church	July 3, 2012 (#12000388)	8090 W. 9th St. 38°28′45″N 95°52′12″W	Lebo	
6	Cow-Killer Archeological Site		June 24, 1975 (#75000719)	Address restricted	Melvern	
7	Samuel Hunt Grave	Samuel Hunt Grave	May 11, 1995 (#95000586)	K-31, east of crossing of Interstate 335 (the Kansas Turnpike); 38°45′15″N 95°55′32″W	Burlingame Township	
8	Karnes Stone Barn	Karnes Stone Barn	January 21, 2004 (#03001468)	4204 E. 129th St. 38°50′02″N 95°35′30″W	Carbondale	
9	Lyndon Carnegie Library	Lyndon Carnegie Library	June 25, 1987 (#87000965)	127 E. 6th 38°36′27″N 95°40′58″W	Lyndon	
10	Osage City Santa Fe Depot	Osage City Santa Fe Depot	May 11, 1989 (#89000386)	508 Market; 38°38′11″N 95°49′38″W	Osage City	
11	Osage County Courthouse	Osage County Courthouse	April 18, 2007 (#07000320)	717 Topeka Ave. 38°36′37″N 95°41′00″W	Lyndon	
12	Rapp School District No. 50	Rapp School District No. 50	July 28, 1995 (#95000944)	U.S. Route 56, northwest of Osage City; 38°39′07″N 95°54′46″W	Osage City	
13	Schuyler Grade School	Schuyler Grade School	April 15, 2011 (#11000193)	117 S. Dacotah St. 38°45′12″N 95°50′13″W	Burlingame	
14	Luther Severy & Son Stock Farm	Luther Severy & Son Stock Farm	January 4, 2023 (#100008526)	11506 West 285th St. 38°33′01″N 95°56′52″W	Reading vicinity	
15	Star Block	Star Block	December 22, 2020 (#100005954)	520 and 522 Market St. 38°38′05″N 95°49′35″W	Osage City	

== See also ==
- List of National Historic Landmarks in Kansas
- National Register of Historic Places listings in Kansas
