= Keene & Simpson =

American architectural firm

Practice information
- Partners: Arthur S. Keene; Leslie B. Simpson, John T. Murphy
- Founders: Arthur S. Keene; Leslie B. Simpson
- Founded: 1909
- Dissolved: 1980
- Location: Kansas City, Missouri

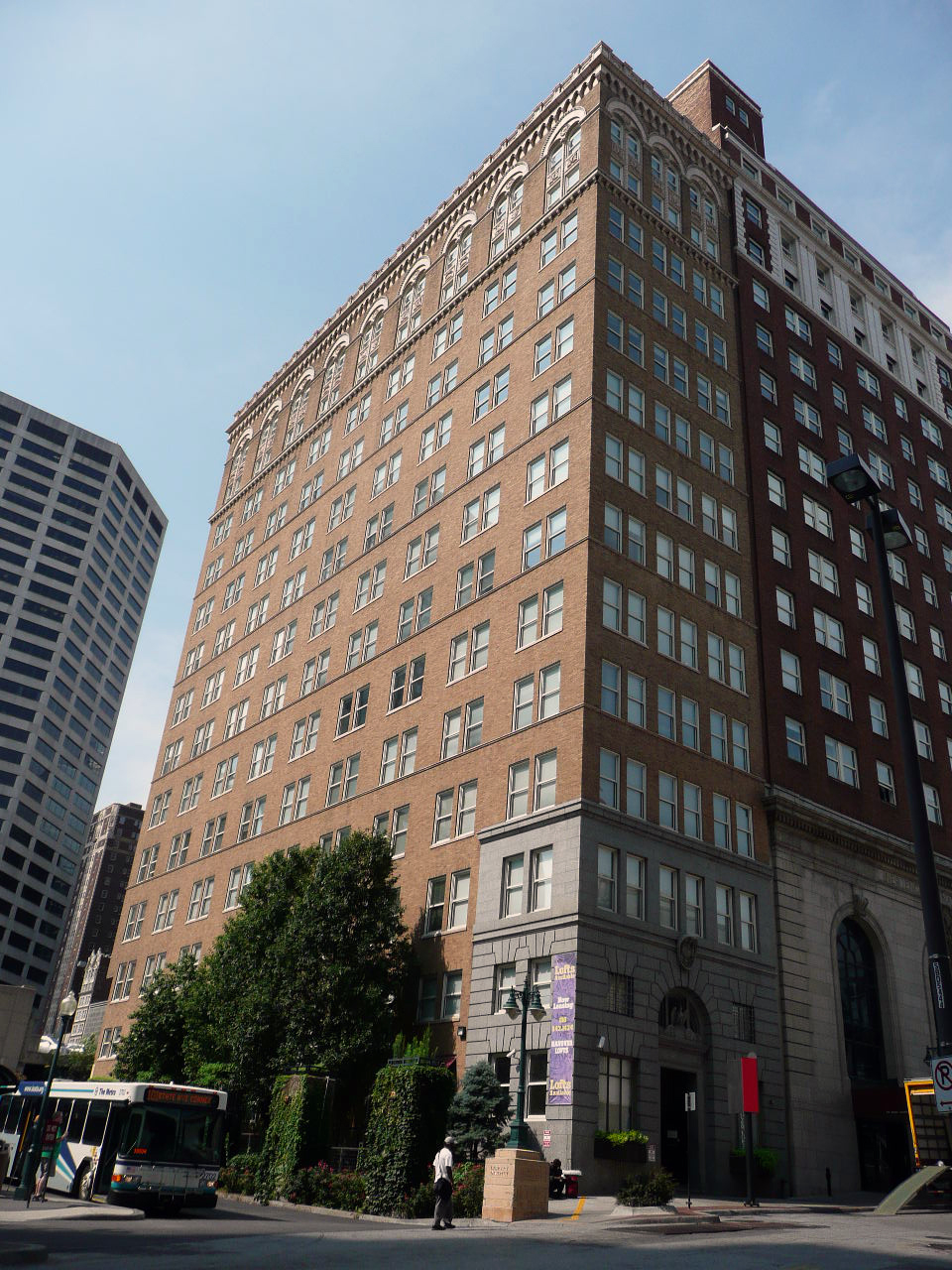
The Land Bank Building in Kansas City, designed by Keene & simpson and completed in 1924.

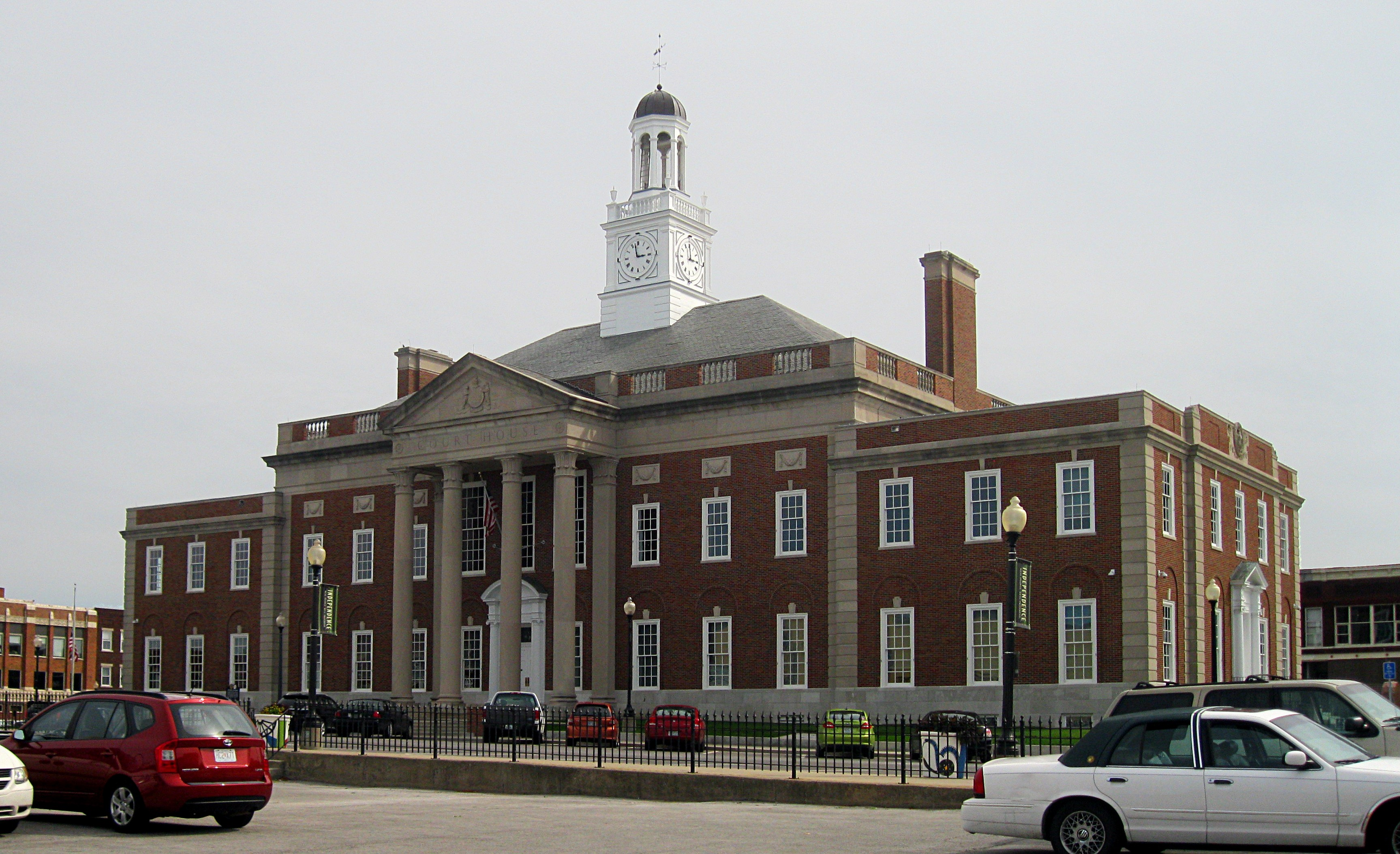
The Jackson County Courthouse in Independence, completed in 1933.

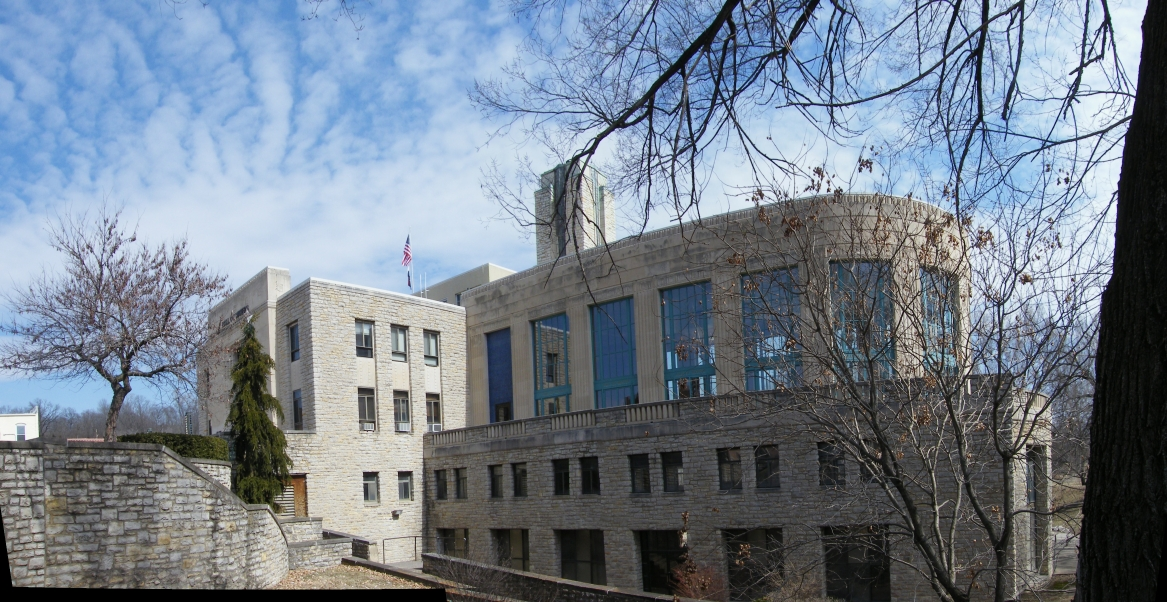
The Hall of Waters in Excelsior Springs, completed in 1937.

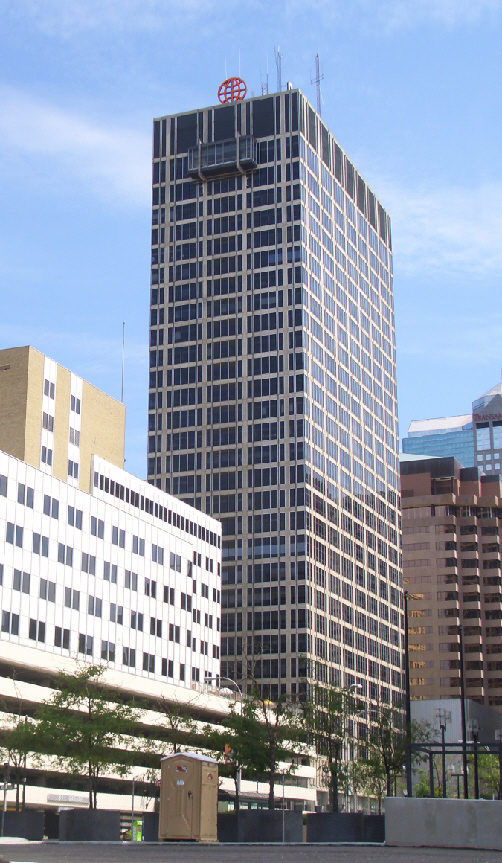
Commerce Tower in Kansas City, completed in 1965.

Keene & Simpson was an American architectural firm based in Kansas City, Missouri, and in practice from 1909 until 1980. The named partners were architects Arthur Samuel Keene FAIA (1875–1966) and Leslie Butler Simpson AIA (1885–1961). In 1955 it became Keene & Simpson & Murphy with the addition of John Thomas Murphy FAIA (1913–1999), who managed the firm until his retirement in 1980.

== Biography and history ==
Arthur Samuel Keene was born September 21, 1875, in Brighton, Boston to Samuel Keene and Marianna (Fuller) Keene. His uncle, George Franklin Fuller, was a Boston-based architect of churches and other buildings. His initial interest in architecture came from the study of the books and drawings in his uncle's library. His formal education was in the Boston public schools and the Massachusetts Institute of Technology, from which he graduated in 1898. He then joined the office of Shepley, Rutan & Coolidge as a drafter, moving to that of Guy Lowell in 1903. In 1907 Keene moved to Kansas City, where he joined the office of Howe & Hoit. In Hoit's office he worked alongside Leslie Butler Simpson. Leslie B. Simpson was born May 30, 1885, in Clayton, Missouri, to Luther Rice Simpson and Nannie (Pigg) Simpson. He attended the public schools and received his early architectural education through correspondence courses of the International Correspondence School of Scranton, Pennsylvania. In 1901 he moved to Kansas City, where he joined Van Brunt & Howe, predecessors to Howe & Hoit. He remained with Hoit until 1909, when he and Arthur S. Keene left to form their partnership, Keene & Simpson.

Keene & Simpson had a successful regional practice, completing buildings in Kansas, Missouri and Oklahoma. In 1955 they expanded the partnership to include John T. Murphy, an MIT graduate who had worked for them since 1945. The firm was then renamed Keene & Simpson & Murphy. Simpson died December 15, 1961, in Kansas City. Keene retired in 1962 and died May 14, 1966, in Topeka, Kansas. Murphy ran the firm under the same name until 1980. Murphy died February 6, 1999, in Kansas City.

Several of their major works were designed as joint ventures with other architects. The Philtower Building in Tulsa, Oklahoma, was designed in association with Edward Buehler Delk of Kansas City, and the Jackson County Courthouse was designed in association with Frederick C. Gunn and Wight & Wight of Kansas City and consulting architect Edward F. Neild of Shreveport, Louisiana. They were also consultants on the Boston Avenue Methodist Church in Tulsa, completed in 1929 and designed by Bruce Goff and Adah Robinson.

All three members of the partnership were involved in the American Institute of Architects, Keene joining in 1916, Simpson in 1921 and Murphy in 1945. In 1938 Keene was elevated to Fellow, followed by Murphy in 1964.

== Legacy ==
At least twelve buildings designed by Keene & Simpson, in whole or in part, have been listed on the United States National Register of Historic Places. Others contribute to listed historic districts.

== Architectural works ==
- Wichita Club (former), (Note: Later known as the Farmer's and Banker's Life Insurance Company Building and now the centerpiece of the Farmer's and Banker's Historic District, NRHP-listed in 2007.) 200 E 1st St, Wichita, Kansas (1909–11)
- Lyndon Carnegie Library, 127 E 6th St, Lyndon, Kansas (1911, NRHP 1987)
- Levi McIntire house, 710 E Armour Blvd, Kansas City, Missouri (1911, NRHP 1983)
- Major Hotel, 112 E Franklin St, Liberty, Missouri (1912, NRHP 1992)
- Emory J. Sweeney house, 5921 Ward Pkwy, Kansas City, Missouri (1919)
- Thos. Corrigan Building, 1828 Walnut St, Kansas City, Missouri (1920–21, NRHP 1982)
- Gate City National Bank Building, 1111 Grand Ave, Kansas City, Missouri (1920, NRHP 1982)
- Kelley-Reppert Motor Company Building, 422 Admiral Blvd, Kansas City, Missouri (1920)
- Land Bank Building, 15 W 10th St, Kansas City, Missouri (1923–24, NRHP 1985)
- Argyle Building addition, (Note: Originally completed in 1907 from designs by Louis S. Curtiss. Keene & Simpson added six stories to the original four story building.) 306 E 12th St, Kansas City, Missouri (1924–25, NRHP 2005)
- Phillips Petroleum Company Building, (Note: The 1927 office block was demolished in 1983, but the 1930 tower addition remains as part of the present ConocoPhillips complex.) 310 S Keeler Ave, Bartlesville, Oklahoma (1927 and 1930, partially extant)
- Philtower Building, (Note: Designed in association with Edward Buehler Delk of Kansas City. A contributing property to the Oil Capital Historic District, NRHP-listed in 2010.) 427 S Boston Ave, Tulsa, Oklahoma (1927–328, NRHP 1979)
- Armour Theatre Building, 408 Armour Rd, North Kansas City, Missouri (1928, NRHP 2008)
- Kansas City Scottish Rite Temple, 1330 E Linwood Blvd, Kansas City, Missouri (1928–30)
- Home for Convalescent Employed Women, 3212 Michigan Ave, Kansas City, Missouri (1931, NRHP 2012)
- Jackson County Courthouse, (Note: Built at the direction of Harry S. Truman, then Presiding Judge of Jackson County.) (Note: The architect in charge was David Frederick Wallace, Truman's brother-in-law and a Keene & Simpson employee.) 112 W Lexington Ave, Independence, Missouri (1932–33, NRHP 1972)
- Jackson County Courthouse, (Note: Designed by Frederick C. Gunn, Keene & Simpson and Wight & Wight, associated architects, with consulting architect Edward F. Neild.) 415 E 12th St, Kansas City, Missouri (1933–34)
- Hall of Waters, 201 E Broadway, Excelsior Springs, Missouri (1936–37, NRHP 1983)
- Van Horn High School, 1109 S. Arlington Ave, Independence, Missouri (1955)
- 811 Main Street building, Kansas City, Missouri (1959)
- Southeast Junior High School (former), 6410 Swope Pkwy, Kansas City, Missouri (1961)
- Commerce Tower, 911 Main St, Kansas City, Missouri (1962–65)
- First National Bank Building, 630 Delaware St, Leavenworth, Kansas (1967)
- Executive Plaza, (Note: Designed in association with Hellmuth, Obata & Kassabaum of St. Louis. Now an apartment building known as the Flashcube.) 720 Main St, Kansas City, Missouri (1972–74)
