= Osage High School =

Osage High School may refer to:

- Osage High School (Iowa), Osage, Iowa
- Osage High School (Missouri), Osage Beach, Missouri
- Osage City High School, Osage City, Kansas
- Fort Osage High School, Independence, Missouri
