= Frederick Apartments (Columbia, Missouri) =

Historic apartment building in Missouri, United States

- U.S. National Register of Historic Places
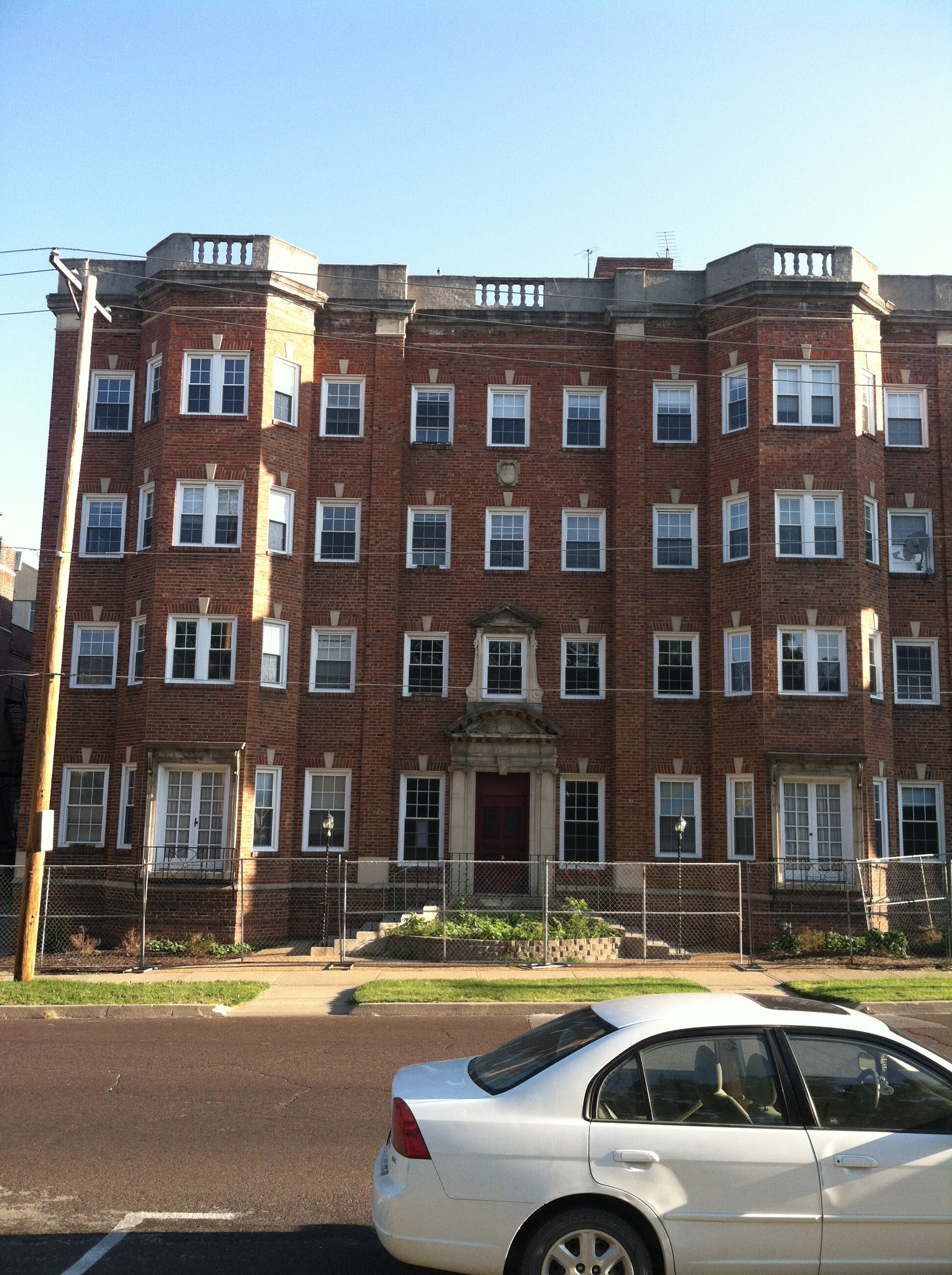
- The Frederick from University Avenue

- Location within Missouri Location within the United States
- Location: 1001 University Avenue, Columbia, Missouri
- Coordinates: 38°56′48″N 92°19′34″W
- Built: 1928
- Architect: David Frederick Wallace
- Architectural style: Classical Revival
- NRHP reference No.: 13000172
- Added to NRHP: April 16, 2013

Frederick Apartments is a well preserved Classical Revival-style apartment building in downtown Columbia, Missouri, across the street from the University of Missouri. Constructed in 1928 with 39 apartments the building has functioned as originally intended since that time. The building was listed on the National Register of Historic Places in 2013 under architectural criteria. It remains one of the largest early twentieth century apartment buildings in Columbia and one of only four remaining in the vicinity. The building is a memorial to Frederick Niedermeyer, Jr., a World War I pilot who perished in a plane crash. As of 2013, the owners are in the process of restoring the building.

It was designed by architect David Frederick Wallace, who also designed the Jackson County Courthouse in Independence.
