= Harry S Truman Office and Courtroom =

Historic site in Missouri, United States

Coordinates: 39°05′33″N 94°24′59″W

The Harry S. Truman Office and Courtroom was the office used by Harry S. Truman during his early political years. It is located in the Jackson County Courthouse in Independence, Missouri.

== History ==
The Office used by Truman is available for tours by the Jackson County Historical Society. Guided tours include a 30-minute video, The Man From Independence, about the life of Harry Truman in Independence, Missouri.
