= Armour Theatre Building =

- U.S. National Register of Historic Places
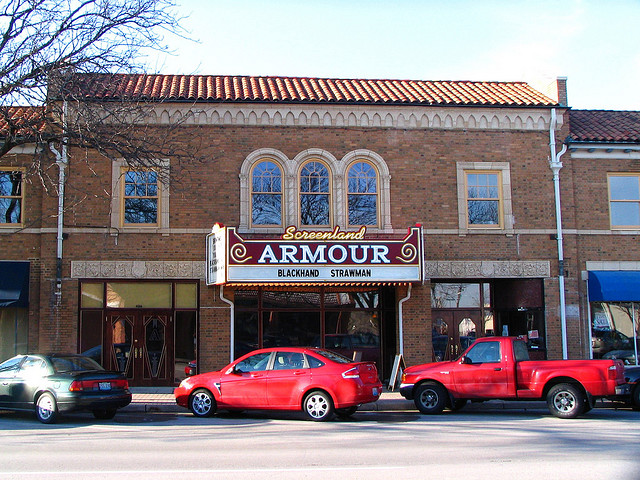
- Armour Theatre Building, September 2012

- Location within Missouri Location within the United States
- Location: 400-410 Armour Rd, North Kansas City, Missouri
- Coordinates: 39°8′40″N 94°34′32″W
- Area: less than one acre
- Built: 1928
- Architect: Keene and Simpson; Fritzlen and Hufford
- Architectural style: Late 19th and 20th Century Revivals, Spanish Eclectic
- NRHP reference No.: 08000560
- Added to NRHP: June 24, 2008

Armour Theatre Building is a historic theatre building located at North Kansas City, Missouri. It was designed by the architectural firm Keene & Simpson and built in 1928. It is a two-story, polychromatic brick building with Spanish Eclectic style design elements. It features a Mission tile roof, arched fenestration and decorative tiles, and glazed terra cotta detailing. The building houses the theater, community rooms, and offices.

It was listed on the National Register of Historic Places in 2008.
