= Major Hotel =

- U.S. National Register of Historic Places
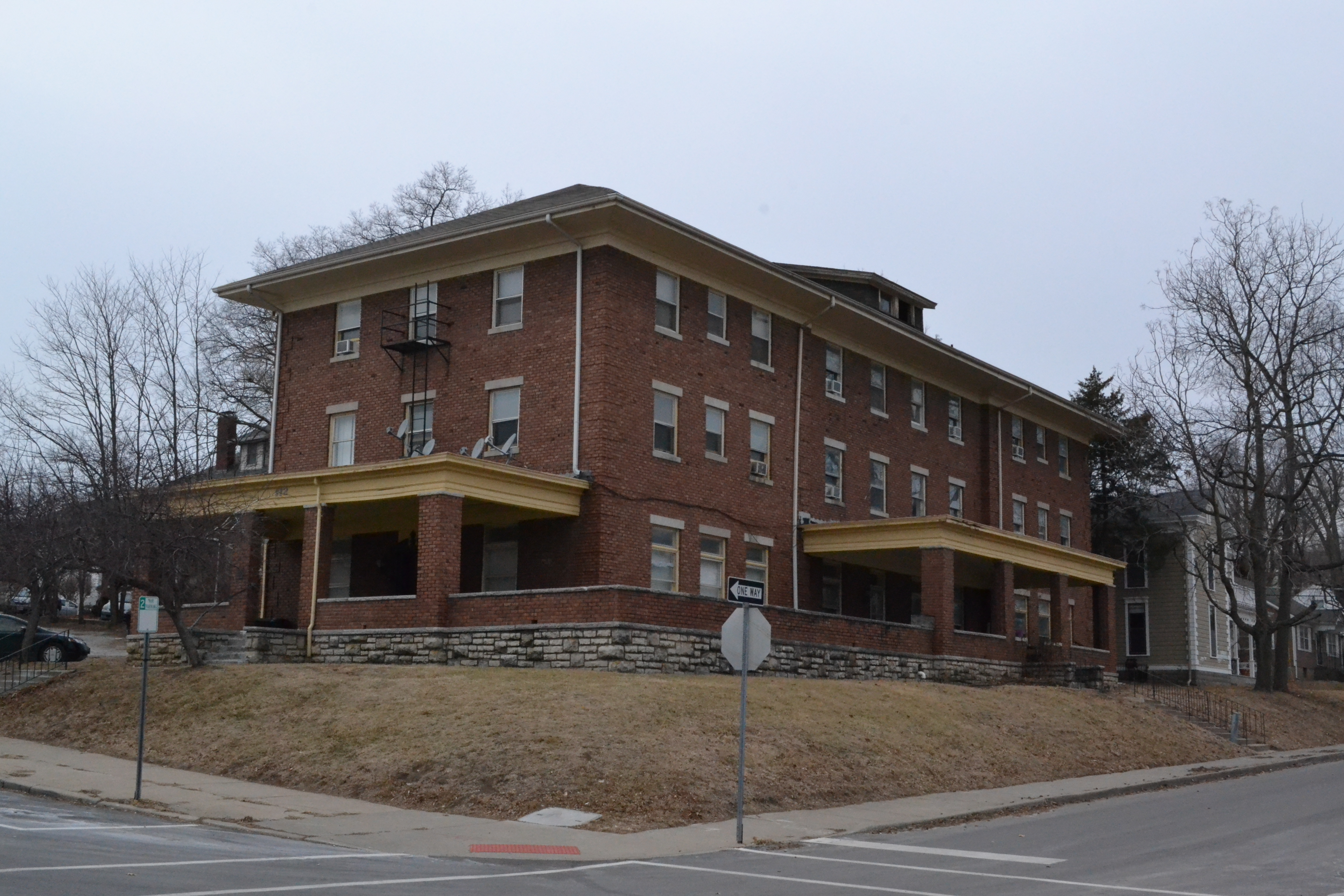

- Location within Missouri Location within the United States
- Location: 112 E. Franklin St., Liberty, Missouri
- Coordinates: 39°14′50″N 94°25′6″W
- Area: less than one acre
- Built: 1912, 1934, 1987
- Built by: Huggins Construction
- Architect: Keene & Simpson
- Architectural style: Colonial Revival, Prairie School
- MPS: Liberty MPS
- NRHP reference No.: 92001678
- Added to NRHP: December 28, 1992

Major Hotel, also known as Colonial Hotel and Franklin House Apartments, is a historic hotel located at Liberty, Clay County, Missouri. It was designed by the architectural firm Keene & Simpson and built in 1912. It is a three-story, rectangular brick building with Colonial Revival and Prairie School style design elements. It features a low-pitched, hipped roof with wide, overhanging eaves and shed-roof dormers and one-story/ full-length verandah porch. It was rebuilt after a fire in 1934 and converted to a 21-unit apartment building in 1987.

It was listed on the National Register of Historic Places in 1992.
