= Osage City station =

- Osage City Santa Fe Depot
- U.S. National Register of Historic Places
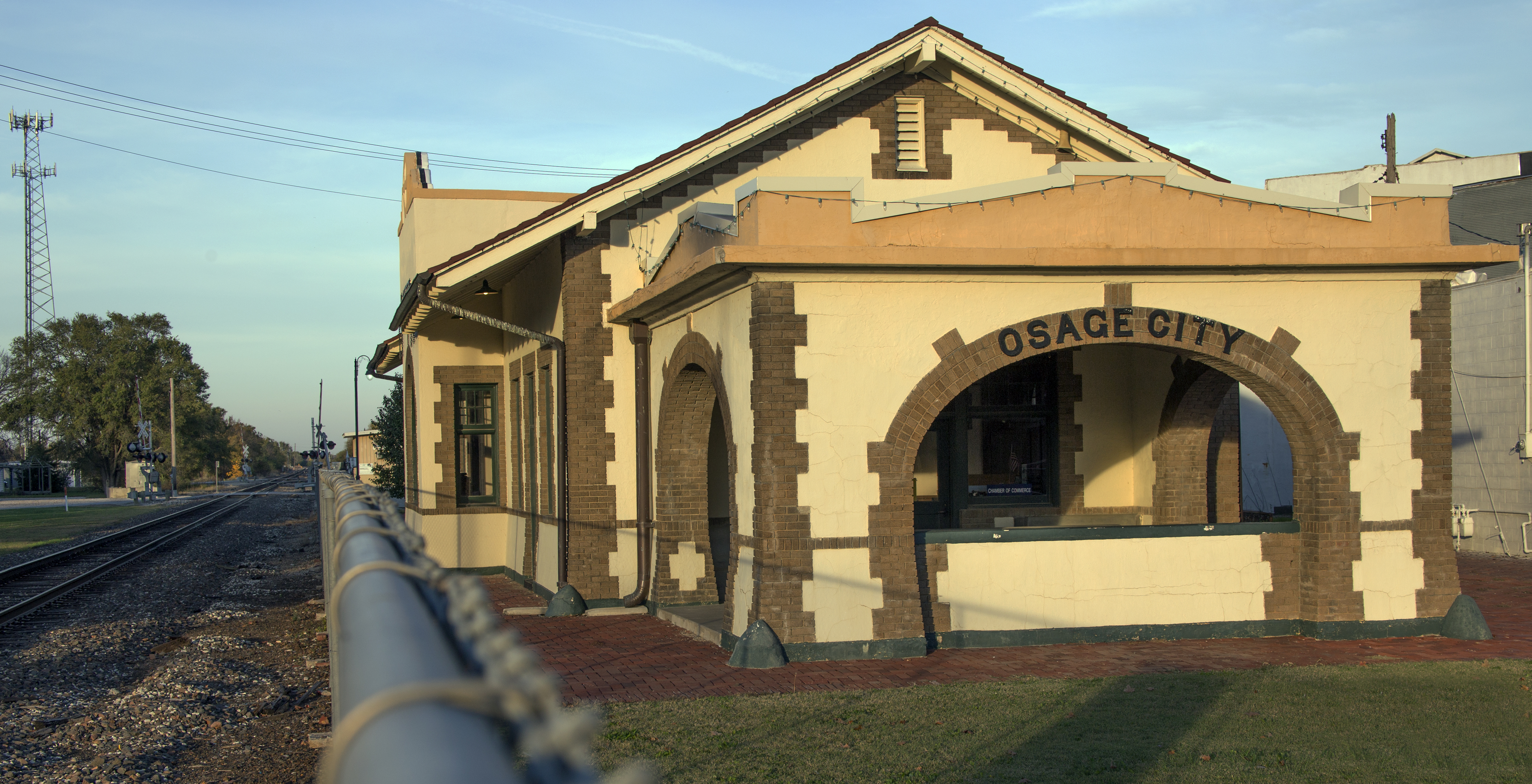

- Location within Kansas Location within the United States
- Location: 508 Market Street; Osage City, Kansas
- Coordinates: 38°38′06″N 95°49′37″W
- Built: Spring 1912
- Architect: Harvey Stivers
- Architectural style: Spanish Mission style
- NRHP reference No.: 89000386
- Added to NRHP: May 11, 1989

The Osage City station, nominated as the Osage City Santa Fe Depot, is a historic railroad depot building at 508 Market Street in Osage City, Kansas. The depot was on the main line of the Atchison, Topeka and Santa Fe Railway. The construction contract was let in September 1911 with the new depot opening in the Spring of 1912 at a cost of $13,000. The Santa Fe sold the depot to the Osage County Historical Society in 1986, which led to the creation of a local museum.

Passenger service to the depot ended between 1970 and May 1, 1971, when Amtrak took over most intercity passenger rail services. Amtrak's Southwest Chief continues to pass by the depot without stopping. The station was added to the National Register of Historic Places on May 11, 1989.

Preceding station	Atchison, Topeka and Santa Fe Railway	Following station
Barclay toward Los Angeles	Main Line	Peterton toward Chicago
