= Land Bank Building =

- U.S. National Register of Historic Places
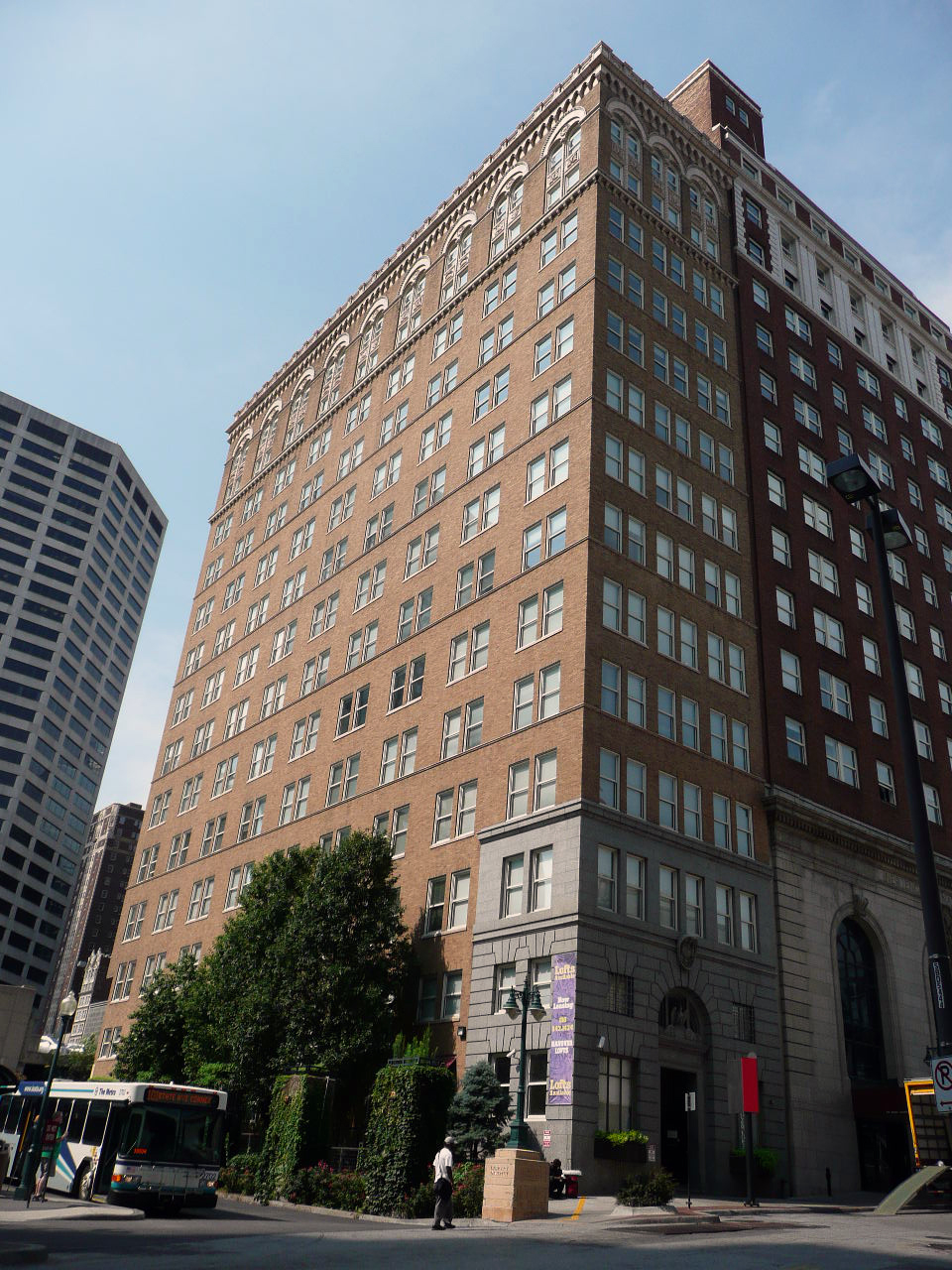
- Land Bank Building in 2015

- Location within Missouri Location within the United States
- Location: 15 W. 10th St., Kansas City, Missouri
- Coordinates: 39°6′7″N 94°35′0″W
- Area: less than one acre
- Built: 1923
- Architect: Keene & Simpson; Bickel Co.
- Architectural style: Late 19th and 20th Century Revivals, Italian Renaissance
- NRHP reference No.: 85000101
- Added to NRHP: January 18, 1985

The Land Bank Building in Kansas City, Missouri is a building from 1923. It was listed on the National Register of Historic Places in 1985.

It was designed by architects Keene & Simpson.

It is Italian Renaissance in style.
