= Argyle Building (Kansas City, Missouri) =

- U.S. National Register of Historic Places
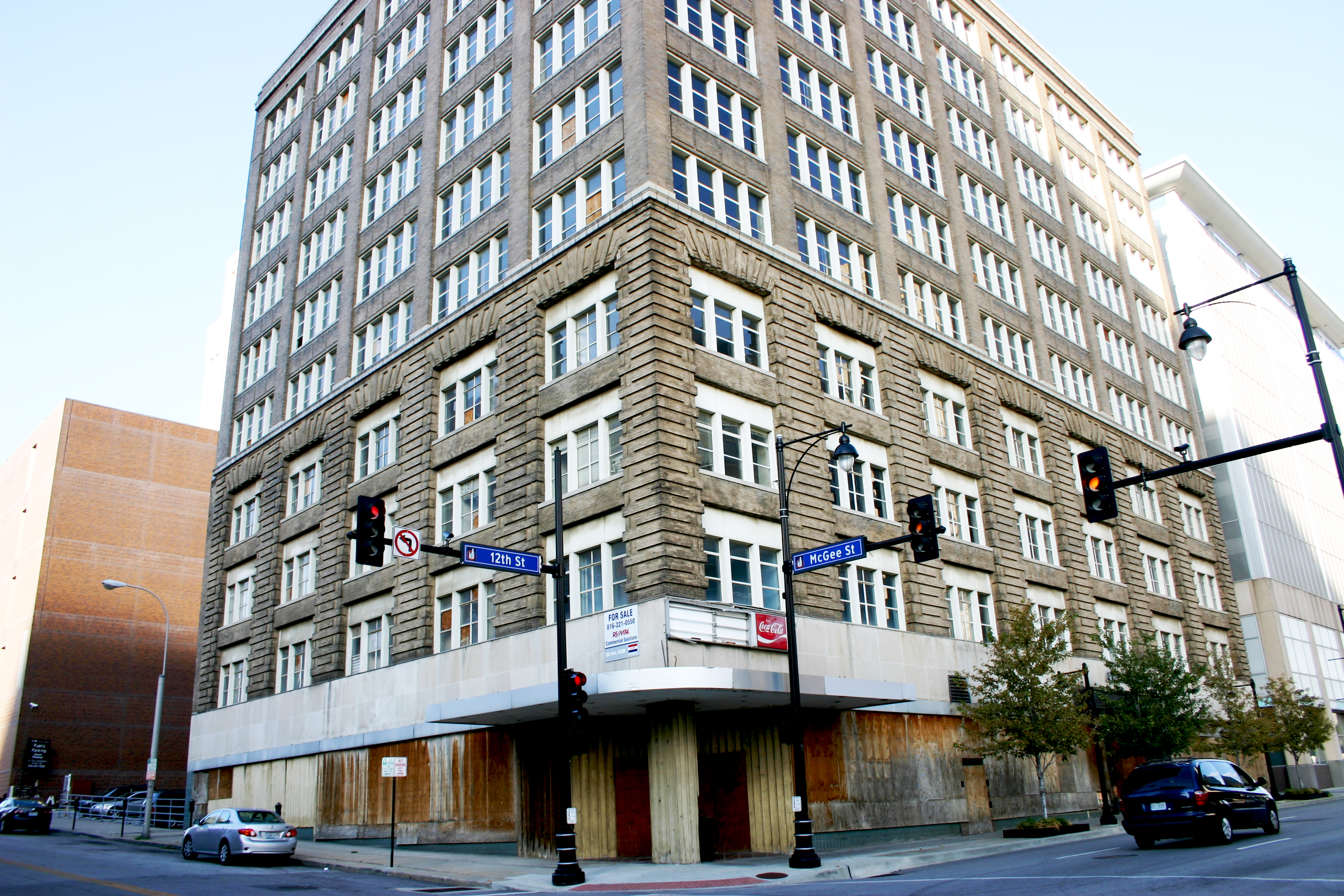

- Location within Missouri Location within the United States
- Location: 306 E. 12th St., Kansas City, Missouri
- Coordinates: 39°6′8″N 94°34′45″W
- Area: less than one acre
- Built: 1906
- Architect: Curtiss, Louis; Keene, Arthur S.
- Architectural style: Early Commercial
- NRHP reference No.: 05000891
- Added to NRHP: August 17, 2005

The Argyle Building in Kansas City, Missouri was built in 1906. It was designed as a 4-story structure by architect Louis Curtiss in Early Commercial style. In 1924–1925, the firm of Keene & Simpson expanded the building to 10 stories. The new floors were used for medical offices. It was listed on the U.S. National Register of Historic Places in 2005.
