= Sigma Alpha Epsilon Building =

- U.S. National Register of Historic Places
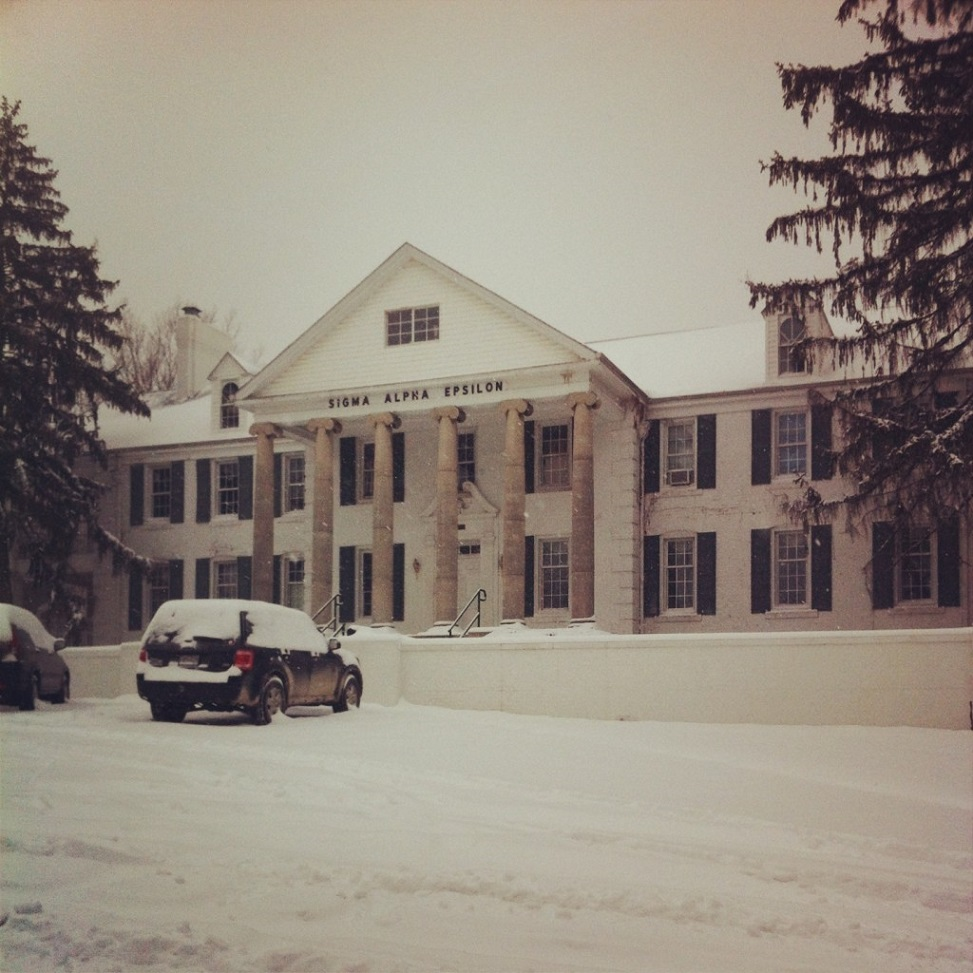
- The building in January 2014

- Location within Missouri Location within the United States
- Location: 24 E. Stewart Road, Columbia, Missouri, US
- Coordinates: 38°56′47″N 92°20′12″W
- Area: 6.7 acres (2.7 ha)
- Built: 1929
- Architect: David Frederick Wallace (1929 renovation)
- Architectural style: Neo-Classical Revival
- NRHP reference No.: 14000870
- Added to NRHP: October 20, 2014

Sigma Alpha Epsilon Building is a historic residence located at 24 East Stewart Road on Oak Hill in Columbia, Missouri. It is the chapter house of Sigma Alpha Epsilon at the University of Missouri. The site was recognized by the Columbia Historic Preservation Commission as one of the city's most notable historic properties in 2004. It was listed on the National Register of Historic Places in 2014.

== History ==
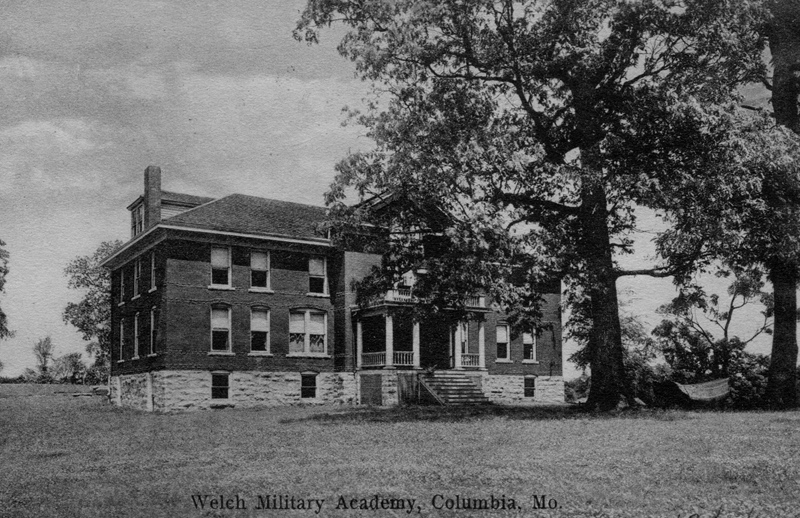
photo of the Welch Military Academy building that was destroyed by fire in October 1907

The original house on Oak Hill was platted in Columbia in 1820, and later served as a hospital during the Civil War era. In the late 19th century, Oak Hill became home to the University Military Academy, sometimes known as Welch Military Academy. The academy originally occupied twenty acres centered on an elevated hilltop near the western edge of the University of Missouri. The now defunct Military Academy was chartered in 1894 and operated by John B. Welch. In 1908, construction was completed on a new structure for the Welch Military Academy, built on same site to replace the structure lost to the fire. Welch continued to operate his military academy in the new building until he retired in 1915.

According to the 1922 Savitar (University of Missouri Yearbook), Welch Hall was leased, remodeled, and furnished by the Women's Student Government Association of the University of Missouri in the 1920–21 academic year. It was able to be occupied by the holiday season that year. It was designed to be a co-operative house, the girls living there had direct control of the house under the supervision of the Women's Student Government Association.

In 1926, the building ceased operations as a dormitory, because Mrs. Welch sold the property to local real estate developer Judge Stewart and his sons. They converted the property to a hotel and campground known as Oak Hill Hotel. Sigma Alpha Epsilon purchased the main building and a significant portion of the surrounding land from Stewart on April 29, 1929.

The fraternity renovated the former hotel into its chapter house in 1929, using architect and fraternity brother David Frederick Wallace. Fire destroyed the roof and much of the interior of the structure in 1965, but the house was rebuilt almost exactly and was rededicated in September 1966. Sigma Alpha Epsilon continued to occupy Welch Hall for the rest of the century.

On April 3, 2008, Sigma Alpha Epsilon was suspended by the university for a minimum of four years following a long history of disciplinary violations. As a result of the suspension of its Missouri chapter, the SAE house corporation agreed to lease the chapter house to the Missouri chapter of Acacia fraternity. The parties agreed on a two-year lease with the option of adding an additional two-year extension. Acacia took possession of the property on June 1 of that year. Acacia was unable to fulfill lease conditions, and the fraternity vacated the property in the first year of the lease.

The Missouri chapter of Tau Kappa Epsilon then leased the property beginning in 2009 until SAE returned to campus following their suspension. SAE fraternity returned to the house in the summer of 2012, but was once again suspended in 2018. The Missouri chapter of Alpha Sigma Phi rented the house from 2019 to 2023. The Missouri Alpha chapter of Sigma Alpha Epsilon has taken ownership again and moved into the house in the fall of 2023.

The property was added to the National Register of Historic Places on October 20, 2014, as the Sigma Alpha Epsilon Building.

== Architecture ==
Sigma Alpha Epsilon is a 2 1/2-story Neo-Classical Revival style brick building with a "T"-plan. Its front facade features a central pedimented portico with six two-story stone Ionic order columns.

Renovation of the hotel into a fraternity house was completed in 1929 under the direction of architect David Frederick Wallace of Marchall and Brown. Wallace attended the University of Missouri for two years and joined Sigma Alpha Epsilon fraternity.

During the Wallace renovation, the dark brick walls were painted white, the facade was greatly expanded with the addition of large open side porches, a formal brick wall was added across the front edge of the yard, and Neo-Classical detailing was added to a rebuilt central front portico.

Fire destroyed the roof and much of the interior of the structure in 1965, but the house was rebuilt almost exactly and was rededicated in September 1966.

== Haunting ==
Prior to the house's use as a military academy beginning in the early 1890s, the original structure once served as a Civil War hospital. Although fire destroyed much of the upper floors in 1907 and 1965, much of the basement remains original to the Civil War hospital, including areas that once housed a crematorium and morgue. According to legend, the bodies of dead soldiers were stored in the basement. One story of the supposed hauntings involves a 1947 SAE pledge class. According to the legend, the pledges "experienced supernatural things" within the house after they were forced to spend the night in the basement. Soon after the experience, they all dropped out of MU and never returned to Columbia.

In keeping with the traditions, legends, and history of the building, the fall pledge class of Sigma Alpha Epsilon began transforming the property into a haunted house as an annual Halloween tradition beginning in 1986.

== See also ==
- North American fraternity and sorority housing
