= David Frederick Wallace =

American architect

David Frederick Wallace (January 7, 1900 – September 30, 1957) was an architect and brother of First Lady of the United States Bess Truman. He was known to family and friends as Fred.

== Early life and education ==
Wallace was born on January 7, 1900, in Independence, Missouri, to parents David Willock Wallace and Margaret Elizabeth Gates. Fred was the youngest of four children, including Elizabeth Virginia "Bess" Wallace, Frank Gates Wallace, and George Porterfield Wallace. His sister Bess married Harry S. Truman.

As the baby boy of the family, Fred Wallace had a very close relationship with his mother. He was known for his love of a good party, and he bore a close resemblance to his father. Fred graduated from William Chrisman High School in Independence in 1918. He attended the University of Missouri for two years around 1919-1920, and he joined Sigma Alpha Epsilon fraternity during his time at the university. By his late 20s, it had become clear that Fred had inherited his father's weakness for liquor. His friends were known to carry him home and leave him on the porch of the family's Independence home after a night of drinking.

== Career ==
Wallace worked as an architect for Kansas City, Missouri, real estate developer J.C. Nichols in the 1920s. In 1928 prominent Columbia, Missouri civic leader Frederick W. Niedermeyer selected Wallace to serve as architect for construction of an apartment building in Columbia. Wallace was a fraternity brother of Niedermeyer's youngest son Pierce. The Classical Revival style Frederick Apartments building was completed in 1928 at a cost of approximately $200,000.

In May 1928, Jackson County, Missouri voters approved a bond issue that provided funding for a major road project and construction of a new county hospital. Fred was having difficulty maintaining successful employment as an architect, so his sister Bess Truman persuaded Judge Harry Truman to put Fred on the country payroll as an architect supervising construction of the new hospital. Construction of the new hospital was completed in 1930; however, Fred's drinking and general irresponsibility brought difficulty to the project and stress on his family. Judge Truman was quoted as saying "The hospital is up at less cost than any similar institution in spite of my drunken brother-in-law, whom I had to employ on the job to keep peace in the family. I've had to run the hospital job myself and pay him for it."

In the 1930s Fred Wallace worked for the architectural firm of Keene & Simpson. In 1931, Jackson County, Missouri voters approved a bond issue that provided funding for several additional projects, including extensive renovations to the Jackson County Courthouse. Judge Harry Truman tapped the firm of Keene & Simpson to serve as the architect for the courthouse renovation, and ensured that his brother-in-law Fred was designated as the architect for the project.

Wallace moved to Denver, Colorado, with his family in 1942, where his brother-in-law Harry Truman assisted in obtaining Fred a position as the regional manager for the War Production Board. Following World War II, the War Production Board was dissolved, and Fred Wallace worked for the architectural firm of T. H. Buell and Co. and then for the Colorado State Highway Department.

== Personal life ==
Wallace married Christine Meyer on July 27, 1933, in Carmel, California. After the couple was married, Wallace brought his new wife to live in his family home at 219 North Delaware in Independence, Missouri. The Wallace family shared this residence with Harry and Bess Truman until Fred Wallace relocated to Colorado with his family in 1942. Fred and Christine Wallace had three children: David Frederick Wallace, Jr., Marion Wallace, and Charlotte Margaret Wallace. Fred Wallace died at Porter Hospital in Denver, Colorado, on September 30, 1957. He had been ill with a kidney ailment.

== Projects ==
- 1928 Frederick Apartments, Columbia, Missouri
- 1929 Welch Hall/Sigma Alpha Epsilon house renovation, Columbia, Missouri
- 1930 Jackson County General Hospital, Kansas City, Missouri
- 1932 Jackson County Courthouse renovation
