= Blake Treinen =

American baseball player (born 1988)

- Treinen in 2026

Free agent
- Relief pitcher
- Born: June 30, 1988 (age 38); Wichita, Kansas, U.S.
- Bats: Right Throws: Right

MLB debut
- April 12, 2014, for the Washington Nationals

MLB statistics (through 2026 season)
- Win–loss record: 49–42
- Earned run average: 2.94
- Strikeouts: 627
- Saves: 83
- Stats at Baseball Reference

Teams
- Washington Nationals (2014–2017); Oakland Athletics (2017–2019); Los Angeles Dodgers (2020–2022, 2024–2026)

Career highlights and awards
- All-Star (2018); 3× World Series champion (2020, 2024, 2025)

Blake Michael Treinen (/ˈtraɪnɛn/ TRY-nen, born June 30, 1988) is an American professional baseball relief pitcher who is a free agent. He has previously played in Major League Baseball (MLB) for the Washington Nationals, Oakland Athletics, and Los Angeles Dodgers.

Treinen played college baseball for the Baker Wildcats and South Dakota State Jackrabbits. The Athletics selected him in the seventh round of the 2011 MLB draft. He was traded to the Nationals in 2013 and made his major league debut in 2014. After losing his closer role, the Nationals traded him back to Oakland in 2017, and Treinen was an All-Star in 2018. After again losing the closer role in 2019, he joined the Dodgers and pitched on the 2020, 2024 and 2025 World Series championship teams.

== Early life and amateur career ==
When Treinen was two years old, he cut his thumb on glass, which required surgery, limited his range of motion, and later affected his grip on a baseball.

Treinen attended Osage City High School in Osage City, Kansas. He played for the school's baseball team as a freshman but quit during his sophomore year as he developed prediabetes. He returned to the team in his junior year, throwing his fastball up to 79 miles per hour (127 km/h).

Treinen then enrolled at Baker University, where he played junior varsity college baseball for the Baker Wildcats in the National Association of Intercollegiate Athletics in 2007. He transferred to the University of Arkansas in 2008 but was denied the opportunity to try out for the NCAA Division I Arkansas Razorbacks. He then increased his weight training.

During Christmas break, Treinen participated in a baseball training camp led by Don Czyz, a Minor League Baseball pitcher. Czyz recommended Treinen to Ritchie Price, the head coach of the South Dakota State Jackrabbits. Treinen transferred to South Dakota State University, sitting out 2009 due to the NCAA's transfer rules. When he was able to pitch for the Jackrabbits, his fastball averaged 87 to 88 miles per hour (140–142 km/h). The Miami Marlins selected Treinen in the 23rd round of the 2010 MLB draft. Though Treinen was willing to sign, an MRI revealed shoulder inflammation, and the Marlins withdrew a contract offer.

In 2011, his senior year, Treinen had a 7–3 win–loss record and a 3.00 earned run average (ERA). During the season, his fastball reached 97 miles per hour (156 km/h).

== Professional career ==
=== Draft and minor leagues ===
The Oakland Athletics selected Treinen in the seventh round of the 2011 MLB draft. He signed, receiving a $52,000 signing bonus. He called his 2012 season pitching for the Stockton Ports of the High-A California League "subpar" and "mediocre". He had a 4.37 ERA in 24 games, including 15 starts.

In January 2013, the Athletics traded Treinen to the Washington Nationals in a three-team deal, in which Washington also received A. J. Cole and Ian Krol, Oakland received John Jaso, and the Seattle Mariners received Michael Morse. With the Harrisburg Senators of the Double-A Eastern League, Treinen had a 3.64 ERA in 2013.

=== Washington Nationals (2014–2017) ===
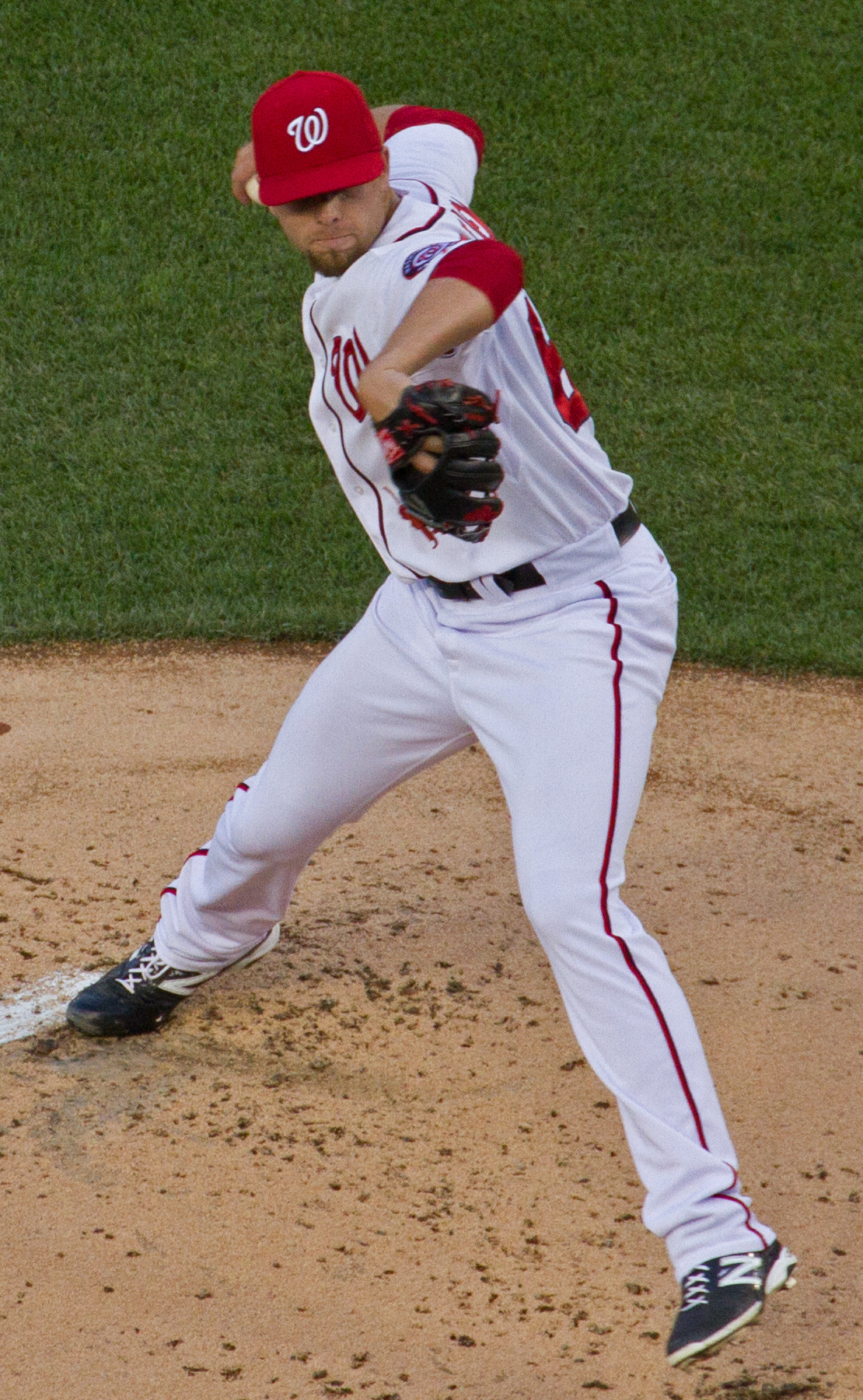
Treinen with the Nationals in 2014

The Nationals invited Treinen to spring training in 2014, where he impressed Nationals' coaches. He began the season with the Syracuse Chiefs of the Triple-A International League and was promoted to the major leagues on April 12. He earned his first career win on June 29, making a spot start against the Chicago Cubs and out-dueling Jeff Samardzija in a 7–2 win. During the 2014 season, Treinen appeared both as a starting pitcher and reliever, with his fastball reaching 98 miles per hour (158 km/h). Splitting the season between the Nationals and Triple-A, Treinen had a 2.49 ERA in 15 major league games and a 3.35 ERA in 16 minor league games.

Treinen started the 2015 season in the Nationals bullpen, with the offseason signing of Max Scherzer creating a crowded starting rotation. Manager Matt Williams, dealing with injuries to his veteran relievers, began using Treinen in late-game situations in early April, occasionally setting up for closer Drew Storen. He also reached 100 mph (160 km/h) with his sinker for the first time in his major league career in April, throwing his fastest career MLB pitch in May at 101.32 mph (163.06 km/h).

Treinen remained with the Nationals for much of the year, posting a 2–5 record with 3 blown saves, a 3.85 ERA and 65 strikeouts for the season. He was optioned back to Triple-A on June 20 after struggling with command for the first half of the season. Upon being recalled the next month, Treinen told The Washington Post that being sent down "was probably the best thing that could have happened", allowing him to work on his approach. However, even late into the season, Treinen struggled to retire left-handed batters, ultimately giving up the final run of the Nationals' season on a solo home run by left-handed New York Mets outfielder Curtis Granderson in a 1–0 loss to the eventual NL champions on October 4.

In 2016, Treinen posted a 2.28 ERA on the year and narrowed his platoon splits versus left-handed batters. He credited veteran teammate Matt Belisle and the team's new pitching coach, Mike Maddux, for helping him improve, while Maddux described Treinen's progress over the course of the season as "puppy dog to bulldog". Treinen led the National League in groundballs induced with 65.9% on the season and ranked highly in inherited runners stranded and soft contact created, among other metrics. Treinen was frequently used in situations when another Nationals pitcher had allowed one or more baserunners and manager Dusty Baker was seeking a double play ball, a role in which he excelled with his high-90s sinker. He was exclusively a reliever for the Nationals all season and made his first playoff appearance for the team, being credited with the win in Game 2 of the National League Division Series (NLDS) against the Los Angeles Dodgers and taking the loss in Game 4. He had a 6.75 ERA in his first postseason.

With the departure of free agent Mark Melancon, the Nationals named Treinen their closer to start the 2017 season. On Opening Day, Treinen pitched a perfect ninth inning against the Miami Marlins with two strikeouts, earning the save, the second of his career. That performance was the only clean inning Treinen pitched in April. He gave up an earned run while notching his second save of the season on April 5 against the Marlins before blowing a save against Miami the following day. On April 19, Baker removed Treinen, sporting a 7.11 ERA, from the closer role, demoting him in favor of Shawn Kelley and later Koda Glover. Despite his poor results, Treinen was called one of the toughest pitchers in the NL East by reigning MVP Christian Yelich.

In June, Treinen's batting average on balls in play hit off him gradually lowered. However, he squandered his first chance in months to earn a save: with both Kelley and Glover on the disabled list and relievers Enny Romero and Matt Albers unavailable, acting manager Chris Speier, needing someone to close out the ninth inning of a 4–2 game against the Chicago Cubs on June 29, called on Treinen for his first save opportunity since being demoted from the closer role. Treinen gave up three earned runs for a blown save as the Cubs won 5–4. The Nationals used Treinen only three more times before trading him.

=== Oakland Athletics (2017–2019) ===
On July 16, 2017, the Nationals traded Treinen back to the Athletics, along with Sheldon Neuse and Jesús Luzardo, seeking to upgrade their bullpen with relievers Sean Doolittle and Ryan Madson. At the time of the trade, Treinen was 0–2 with a 5.73 ERA, 3 saves, and two blown saves. With the Athletics, Treinen blew two more saves before picking up a save. He converted 13 of 16 save opportunities after the trade. In early September, Treinen took three losses in a row, and was responsible for a fourth, but the A's rallied for two runs in the bottom of the ninth to walk off the Houston Astros 9–8, and Treinen got the win instead.

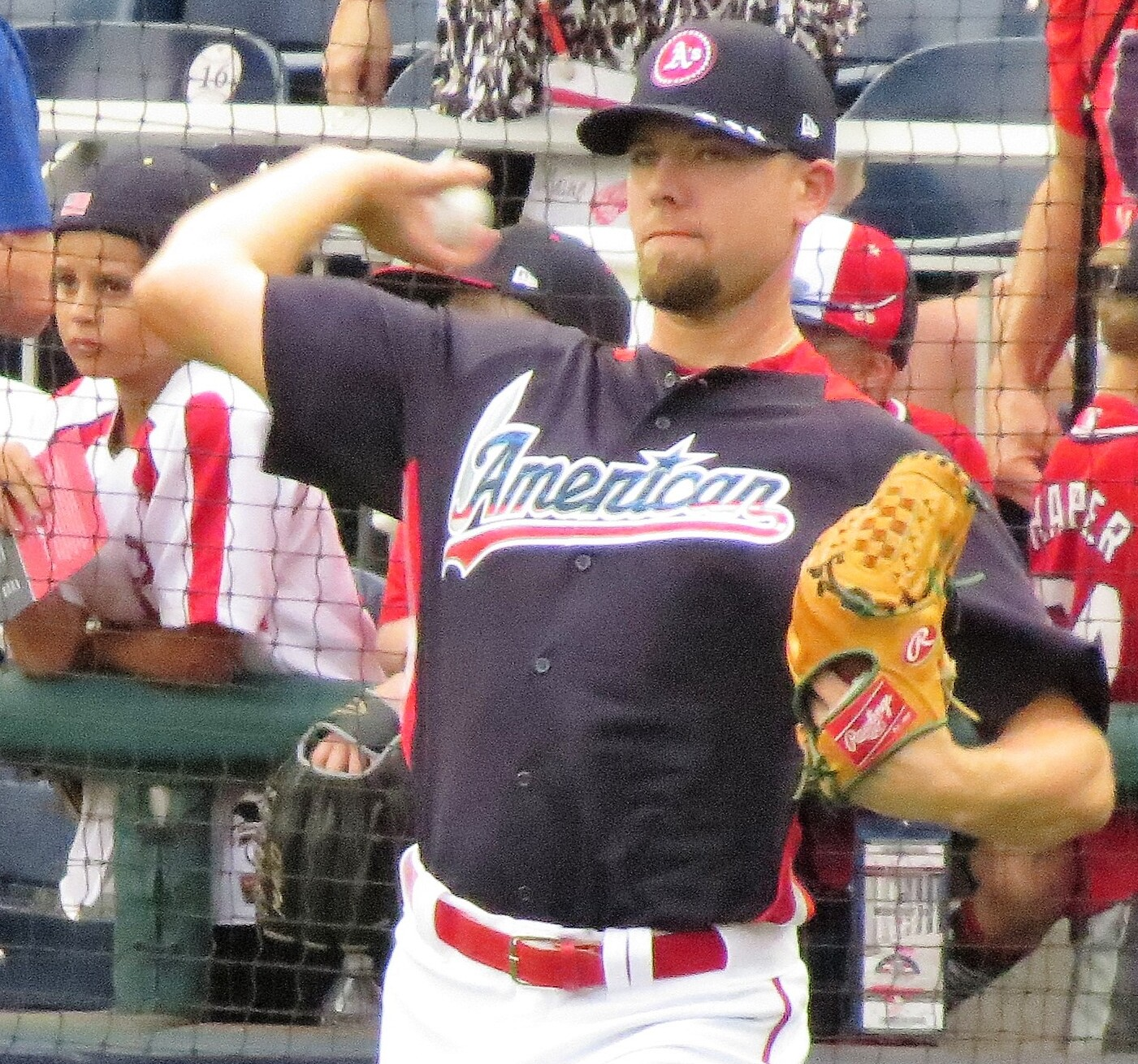
Treinen before the 2018 All-Star Game

In the first half of the 2018 season, Treinen had a 5–1 record with an 0.79 ERA and 23 saves. He was named an All-Star. He finished the season with a 9–2 record, 38 saves (third in the AL), 3 blown saves and an 0.78 ERA. He gave up three runs in the Wild Card Game, including a home run to Giancarlo Stanton.

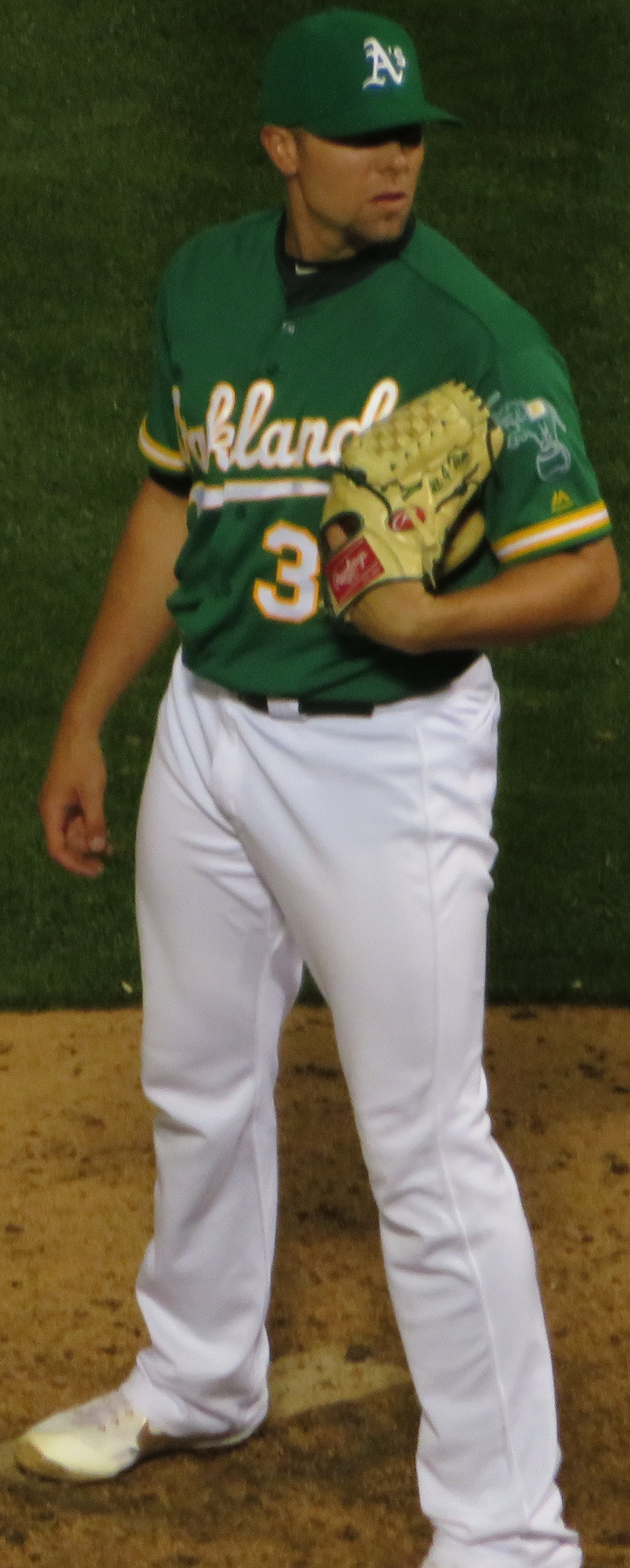
Treinen with the Athletics in 2019

Treinen won his salary arbitration case before the 2019 season, getting a $6.4 million salary for the season.

On June 21, 2019, Treinen was placed on the 10-day injured list with a right shoulder injury after giving up three runs to the Tampa Bay Rays without recording an out. He lost the closer role to Liam Hendriks. Treinen was activated on July 3 and earned a loss that night. In 2019, Treinen was 6–5 with a 4.91 ERA, 16 saves, 5 blown saves, and 59 strikeouts in 58 2/3 innings. He was left off the team's postseason roster. On December 2, Oakland non-tendered Treinen, opting not to pay him a projected $8 million for the next season, and he became a free agent.

=== Los Angeles Dodgers (2020–present) ===
On December 15, 2019, Treinen signed a one-year, $10 million contract with the Los Angeles Dodgers. The 2020 season was shortened by the COVID-19 pandemic, but Treinen appeared in 27 games for the Dodgers (third most in the NL), with a 3–3 record with one save in two chances and a 3.86 ERA. In the postseason, he pitched one inning in the Wild Card series, 2 1/3 innings in the NLDS, 5 1/3 innings in the National League Championship Series (NLCS) (earning a loss in Game 1), and 2 2/3 innings in the World Series, allowing six runs during the postseason and picking up a save in Game 5 of the World Series. The Dodgers won the World Series in six games.

In January 2021, the Dodgers re-signed Treinen to a two-year, $17.5 million contract, which also included a team option for a third year. At the start of the 2021 season, he threw his first 100 mph pitches since 2018. Treinen pitched in 72 games in 2021, with a 1.99 ERA, a 6–5 record, seven saves, 4 blown saves, 85 strikeouts, and an MLB-best 32 holds. In the playoffs, he pitched 1 2/3 scoreless innings in the Wild Card Game, allowed one run on one hit with five strikeouts in 3 1/3 innings in the NLDS, and gave up one run in 3 2/3 innings in the NLCS. He lost Game 1 of the NLCS on the second go-ahead ninth inning NLCS home run he gave up to Austin Riley.

Treinen had a sore shoulder early in the 2022 season that shut him down for the first half of the season. Despite the injury, on May 22, the Dodgers signed him to a one-year, $8 million, extension covering the 2023 season and included a conditional option for 2024. He pitched in five games for the Dodgers, allowing one run in five innings while spending most of the season on the injured list, returning from his original injury only to quickly go back on the list. On November 11, Treinen underwent right shoulder labrum and rotator cuff repair surgery, with an estimated 10-month recovery. He did not pitch in 2023 but the team picked up his $1 million option for 2024.

Treinen was expected to return for the start of the 2024 season but suffered cracked ribs and a bruised lung in spring training and began the season on the injured list. After a minor league rehab assignment, he was activated by the Dodgers on May 5. He was effective despite lower velocity. He pitched 46 2/3 innings in 50 games, with a 7–3 record, 1 save, 4 blown saves, a 1.93 ERA, and 56 strikeouts. He pitched 3 2/3 scoreless innings with two saves in the NLDS and allowed one run in 4 1/3 innings in the NLCS. He earned two wins with a 4.15 ERA in 4 1/3 innings in the World Series, pitching poorly in the 9th inning of Game 2. On December 10, Treinen signed a two-year, $22 million contract to remain with the Dodgers.

Treinen earned his first loss and blown save of the 2025 season on April 6. On April 19, he returned to the injured list due to forearm tightness; he was transferred to the 60-day injured list on May 1. Treinen rejoined the Dodgers on July 27, and he allowed one run in 2/3 of an inning the following day. In September, Treinen earned the loss in five consecutive Dodgers losses, a feat not accomplished in the majors since at least 1912. The streak started on September 6, when he relieved Yoshinobu Yamamoto, who had pitched 8 2/3 no-hit innings. The fifth loss was on September 21, when he allowed three runs and got two outs after Emmett Sheehan's scoreless seven innings. He finished the season with a 2–7 record, 5.40 ERA in 26 2/3 innings over 32 games. His struggles continued in the postseason as Treinen allowed two runs in one inning of the 2025 NLDS, one run in 1 1/3 innings of the 2025 NLCS and one run on five hits in 1 2/3 innings of the 2025 World Series.

Treinen made 36 appearances for the Dodgers during the 2026 campaign, recording a 4–1 record and 3.64 ERA with 31 strikeouts. He spent much of the season on the injured list due to right elbow inflammation.

== Personal life ==
Treinen and his wife Kati have four children and live in Walla Walla, Washington. She is an assistant women's basketball coach at Walla Walla Community College and played college basketball at Walla Walla and Boise State University. Treinen was a volunteer assistant coach for the Whitman College Blues baseball team in Walla Walla from 2015 to 2020. Treinen's bulldog Maxx accompanied him on a road trip from Walla Walla to spring training in Florida in 2016.

Treinen is Roman Catholic. In 2023, Treinen criticized the Dodgers for inviting the Sisters of Perpetual Indulgence, an LGBT activist group, to their annual Pride Night, saying that it "disenfranchises a large community and promotes hate of Christians and people of faith." In June 2026, Treinen refused to wear Dodgers' Pride Night hats.

Treinen has promoted conspiracy theories on Instagram. He chose not to attend the Dodgers' trip to the White House in 2021 but did go on the team's 2025 visit.

Treinen was nicknamed "The Witch" by Rob Friedman on his Pitching Ninja social media accounts for Treinen's fast sinker with movement. However, Treinen "hated" the nickname, according to Friedman. Treinen's sinker was a clue on Jeopardy! in February 2016.
