= Osage City High School =

Location
- 515 Ellinwood Street; Osage City, Kansas 66523; United States
- Coordinates: 38.6310°N 95.8274°W

Information
- Type: Public high school
- School district: Unified School District No. 420
- Principal: Tony Heward
- Teaching staff: 19.10 (FTE)
- Grades: 9–12
- Enrollment: 218 (2023–2024)
- Student to teacher ratio: 11.41
- Color(s): Red and white
- Team name: Indians
- Website: www.usd420.org/home

Osage City High School is a public high school in Osage City, Kansas, United States. It is a part of Unified School District 420.

== Athletics ==
=== Teams ===
Osage City's athletic teams are nicknamed the Indians and the school's colors are red and white. Osage City teams compete in the following sports:

- Football
- Golf
- Baseball
- Softball
- Basketball
- Track
- Cross country
- Volleyball

=== State championships ===
- Boys basketball
  - 2016 Kansas 3A State Champions

== Demographics ==
88% of the student population at Osage City High School identify as Caucasian, 1% identify as African American, 2% identify as American Indian/Alaskan Native, 0.5% identify as Asian, 3% identify as Hispanic, and 5% identify as multiracial. The student body makeup is 48% male and 52% female.

== Notable alumni ==
- Blake Treinen, MLB player for the Los Angeles Dodgers
