= Lyndon, Kansas =

City in Osage County, Kansas

- City and County seat
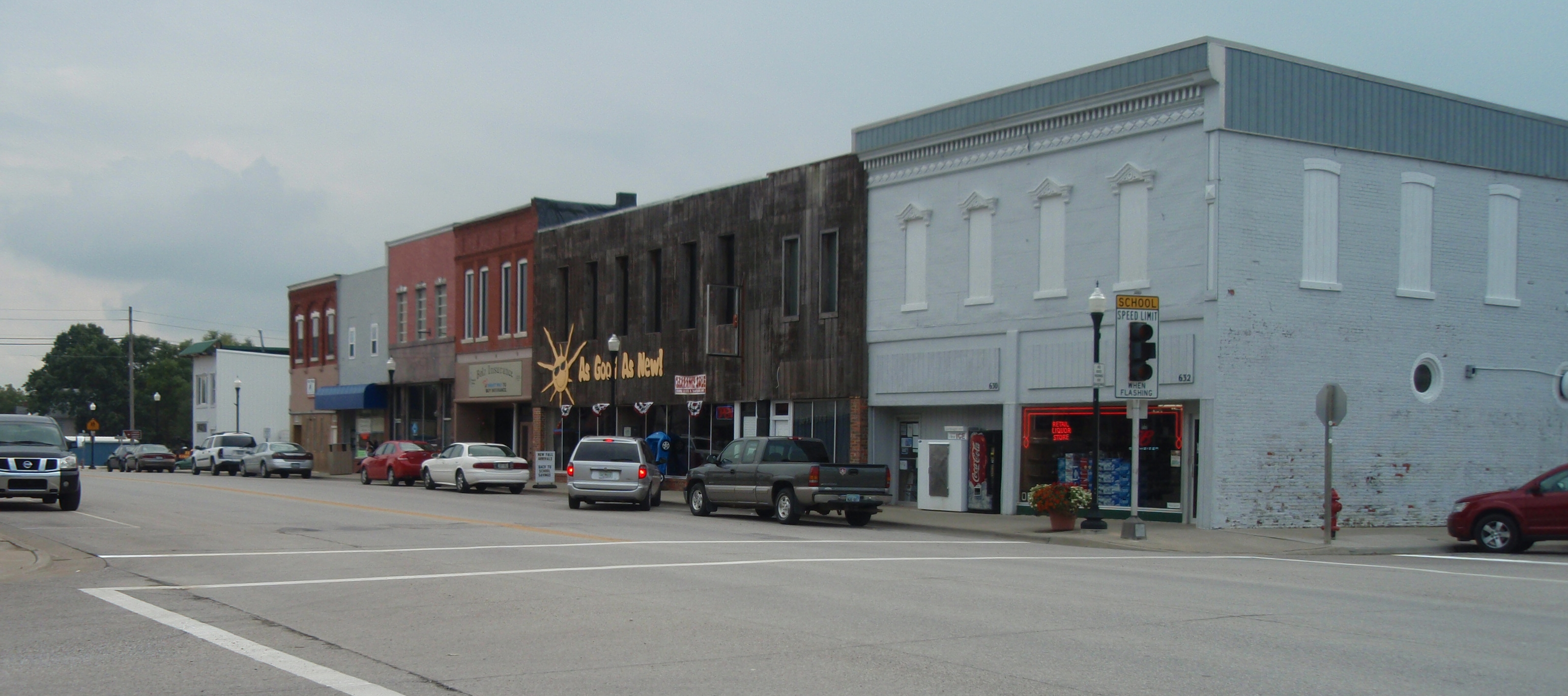
- Downtown Lyndon (2009)

- Location within Osage County and Kansas

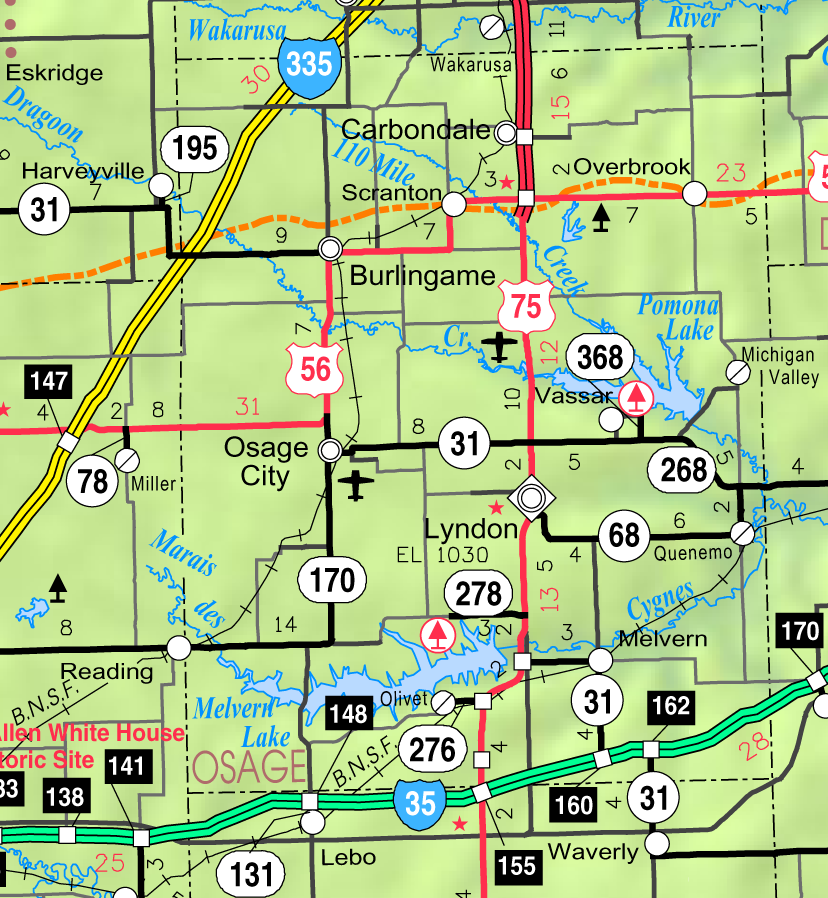
- KDOT map of Osage County (legend)
- Coordinates: 38°36′37″N 95°41′7″W
- Country: United States
- State: Kansas
- County: Osage
- Founded: 1869
- Incorporated: 1870
- Named for: Lyndon, Vermont

Area
  - Total: 0.89 sq mi (2.31 km^{2})
  - Land: 0.89 sq mi (2.31 km^{2})
  - Water: 0 sq mi (0.00 km^{2})
- Elevation: 1,040 ft (320 m)

Population (2020)
  - Total: 1,037
  - Density: 1,160/sq mi (449/km^{2})
- Time zone: UTC-6 (CST)
  - Summer (DST): UTC-5 (CDT)
- ZIP Code: 66451
- Area code: 785
- FIPS code: 20-43350
- GNIS ID: 479609
- Website: lyndonks.gov

Lyndon is a city in and the county seat of Osage County, Kansas, United States. As of the 2020 census, the population of the city was 1,037.

== History ==
Lyndon was founded in 1869 after the land in the area was taken from the Sac and Fox Nation by the government for homesteading. It was named after Lyndon, Vermont.

== Geography ==
Lyndon is located at 38°36′37″N 95°41′7″W (38.610233, -95.685352). According to the United States Census Bureau, the city has a total area of 0.83 square miles (2.15 km^{2}), all land.

=== Climate ===
The climate in this area is characterized by hot, humid summers and generally mild to cool winters. According to the Köppen Climate Classification system, Lyndon has a humid subtropical climate, abbreviated "Cfa" on climate maps.

== Demographics ==
Historical population
Census	Pop.	Note	%±
1890	935		—
1900	1,004		7.4%
1910	763		−24.0%
1920	732		−4.1%
1930	742		1.4%
1940	751		1.2%
1950	729		−2.9%
1960	953		30.7%
1970	958		0.5%
1980	1,132		18.2%
1990	964		−14.8%
2000	1,038		7.7%
2010	1,052		1.3%
2020	1,037		−1.4%
U.S. Decennial Census

Lyndon is part of the Topeka metropolitan area.

=== 2020 census ===
The 2020 United States census counted 1,037 people, 424 households, and 291 families in Lyndon. The population density was 1,162.6 per square mile (448.9/km^{2}). There were 454 housing units at an average density of 509.0 per square mile (196.5/km^{2}). The racial makeup was 94.41% (979) white or European American (93.25% non-Hispanic white), 0.1% (1) black or African-American, 0.1% (1) Native American or Alaska Native, 0.1% (1) Asian, 0.1% (1) Pacific Islander or Native Hawaiian, 0.1% (1) from other races, and 5.11% (53) from two or more races. Hispanic or Latino of any race was 1.64% (17) of the population.

Of the 424 households, 37.0% had children under the age of 18; 47.6% were married couples living together; 24.5% had a female householder with no spouse or partner present. 27.1% of households consisted of individuals and 13.7% had someone living alone who was 65 years of age or older. The average household size was 2.7 and the average family size was 3.2. The percent of those with a bachelor's degree or higher was estimated to be 17.7% of the population.

28.0% of the population was under the age of 18, 8.3% from 18 to 24, 23.9% from 25 to 44, 23.3% from 45 to 64, and 16.5% who were 65 years of age or older. The median age was 35.1 years. For every 100 females, there were 99.0 males. For every 100 females ages 18 and older, there were 103.5 males.

The 2016–2020 5-year American Community Survey estimates show that the median household income was $49,432 (with a margin of error of +/- $9,498) and the median family income was $59,125 (+/- $15,798). Males had a median income of $31,438 (+/- $5,840) versus $29,125 (+/- $10,493) for females. The median income for those above 16 years old was $30,465 (+/- $5,055). Approximately, 0.0% of families and 7.5% of the population were below the poverty line, including 3.1% of those under the age of 18 and 9.9% of those ages 65 or over.

=== 2010 census ===
As of the census of 2010, there were 1,052 people, 422 households, and 285 families living in the city. The population density was 1,267.5 inhabitants per square mile (489.4/km^{2}). There were 464 housing units at an average density of 559.0 per square mile (215.8/km^{2}). The racial makeup of the city was 97.5% White, 0.4% African American, 0.7% Native American, 0.1% Asian, and 1.3% from two or more races. Hispanic or Latino of any race were 1.0% of the population.

There were 422 households, of which 37.0% had children under the age of 18 living with them, 53.8% were married couples living together, 10.9% had a female householder with no husband present, 2.8% had a male householder with no wife present, and 32.5% were non-families. 29.1% of all households were made up of individuals, and 13.8% had someone living alone who was 65 years of age or older. The average household size was 2.45 and the average family size was 3.02.

The median age in the city was 36.8 years. 28% of residents were under the age of 18; 6.1% were between the ages of 18 and 24; 26.2% were from 25 to 44; 25.7% were from 45 to 64; and 13.9% were 65 years of age or older. The gender makeup of the city was 50.9% male and 49.1% female.

== Education ==
The community is served by Lyndon USD 421 public school district.

== Gallery ==
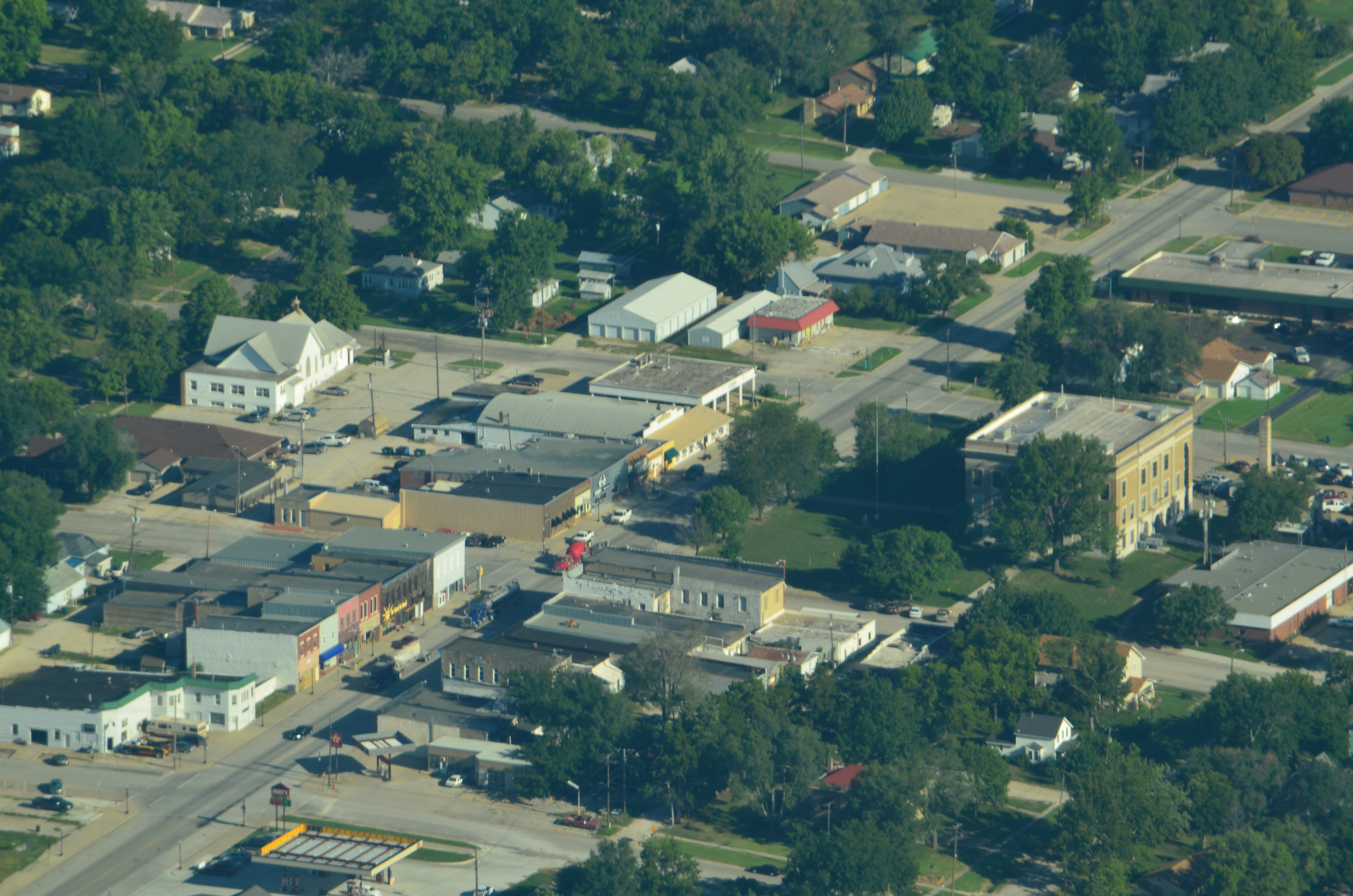
Aerial view of Lyndon (2013)

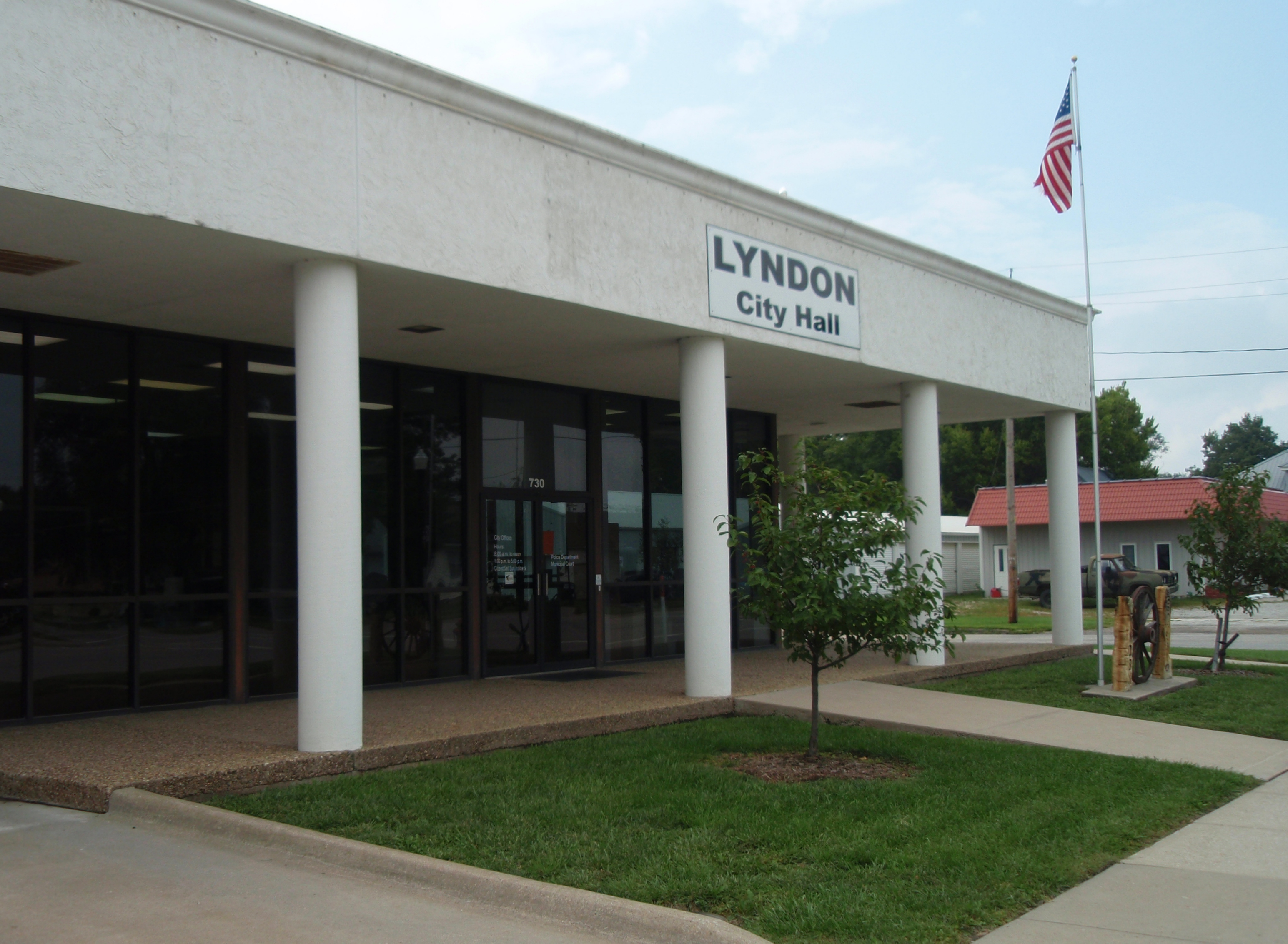
Lyndon City Hall (2009)

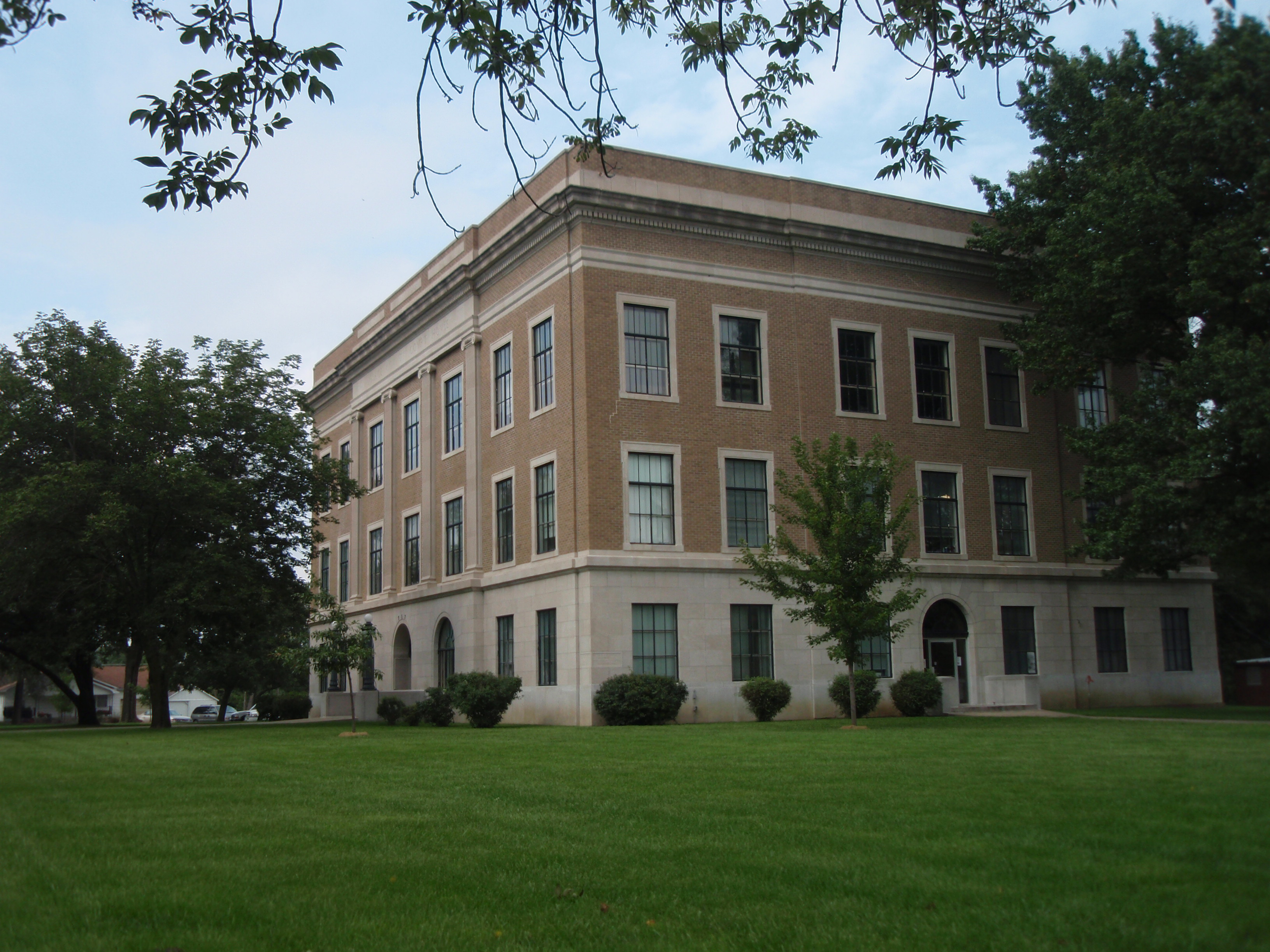
Osage County Courthouse (2009)

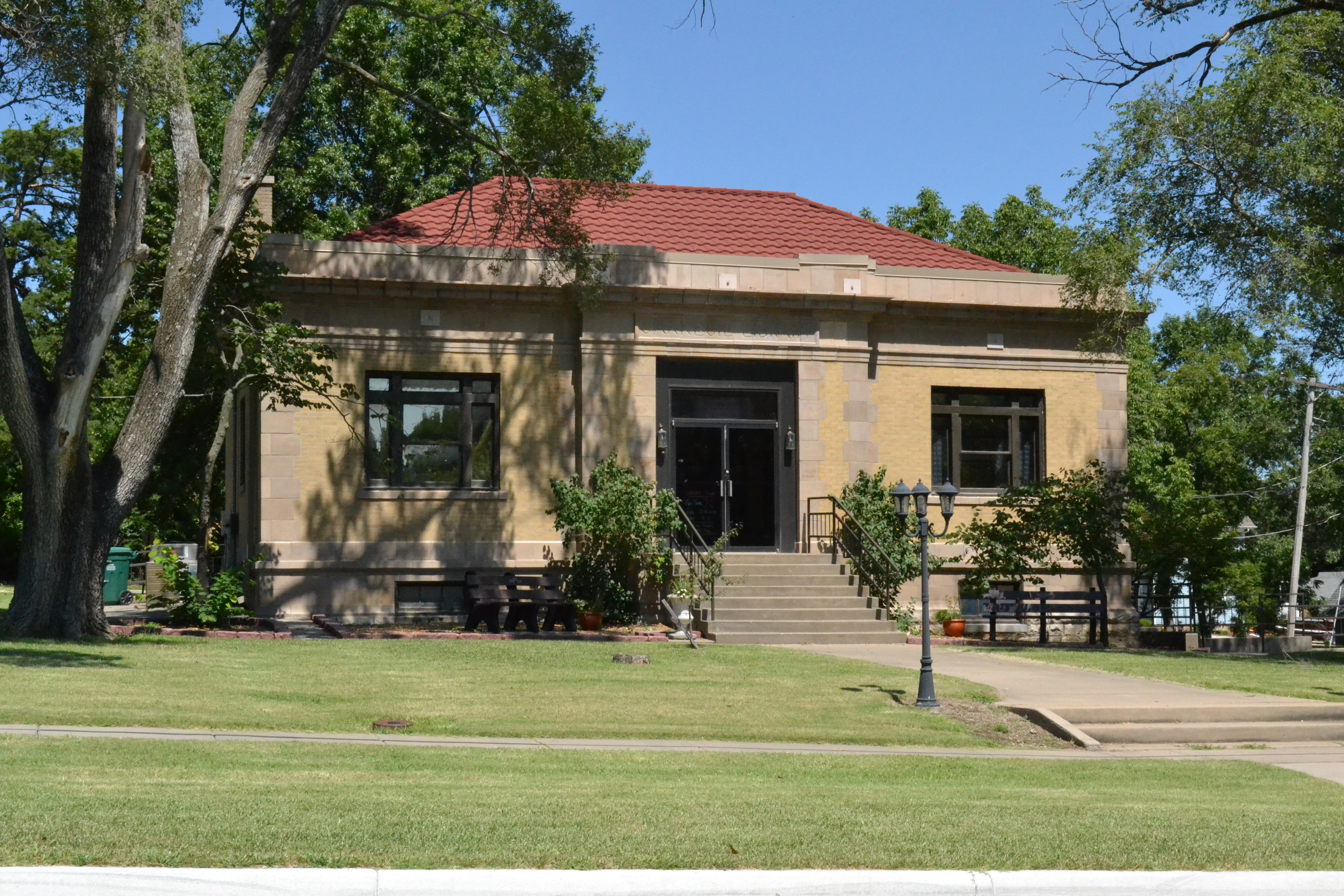
Lyndon Carnegie Library (2017)

== See also ==
- National Register of Historic Places listings in Osage County, Kansas
- Melvern Lake
- Pomona State Park
