= Karnes Stone Barn =

- U.S. National Register of Historic Places
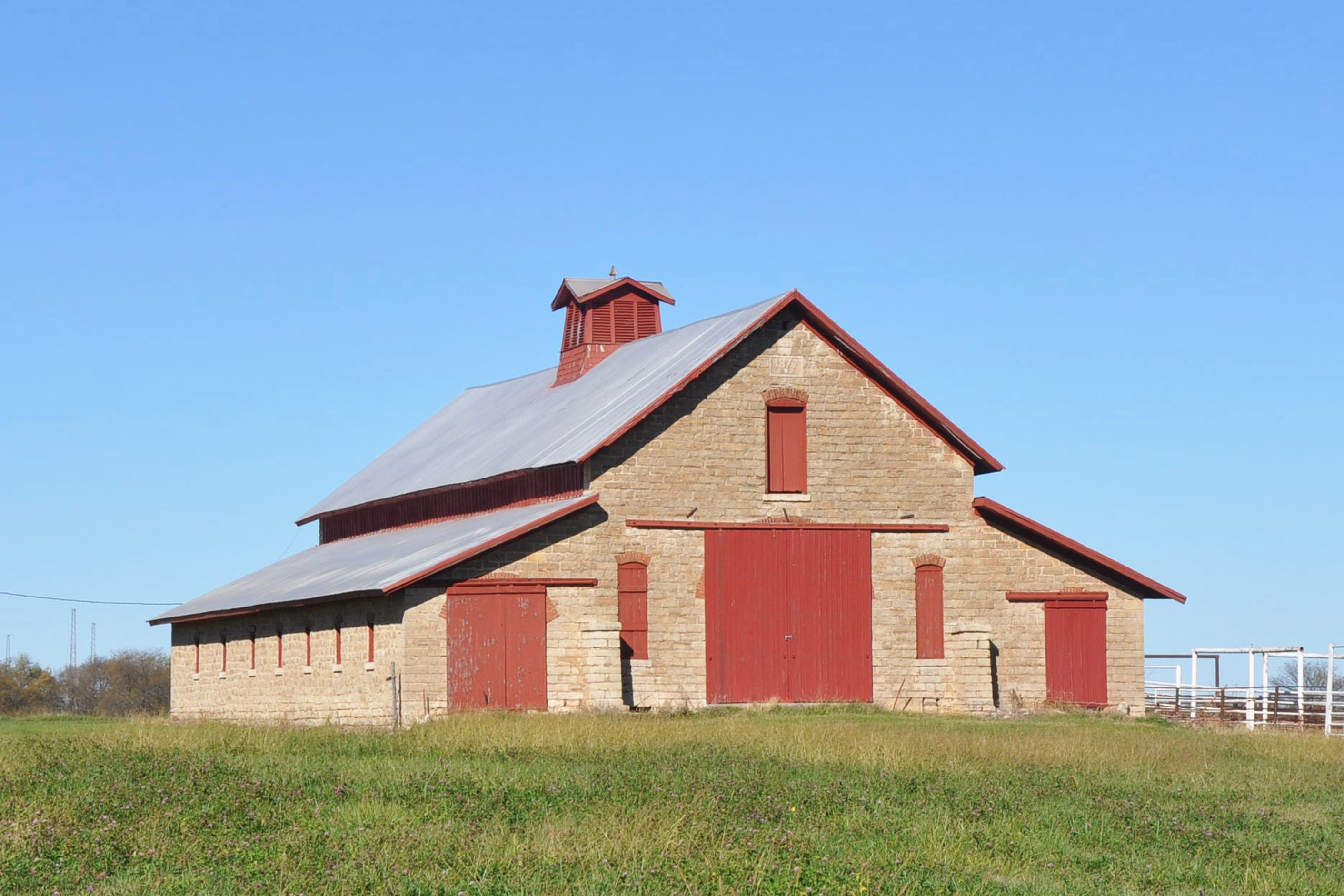
- The Karnes Stone Barn in 2021

- Location within Kansas Location within the United States
- Location: 4204 E. 129th St., near Carbondale, Kansas
- Coordinates: 38°50′02″N 95°35′30″W
- Area: Less than one acre
- Built: 1877
- Built by: Bronson, G.R.
- Architectural style: Functional
- NRHP reference No.: 03001468
- Added to NRHP: January 21, 2004

The Karnes Stone Barn, near Carbondale in Osage County, Kansas, is a barn built in 1877. It was listed on the National Register of Historic Places in 2004.

It was built for George R. Bronson, a circus man. It is a limestone structure which is 80 by 50 feet (24 m × 15 m) in plan and 30 feet (9.1 m) tall.

It apparently was originally built to hold a circus; it was later used as a milking barn.
