= Arvonia School =

Historic school building in Kansas, United States

- U.S. National Register of Historic Places
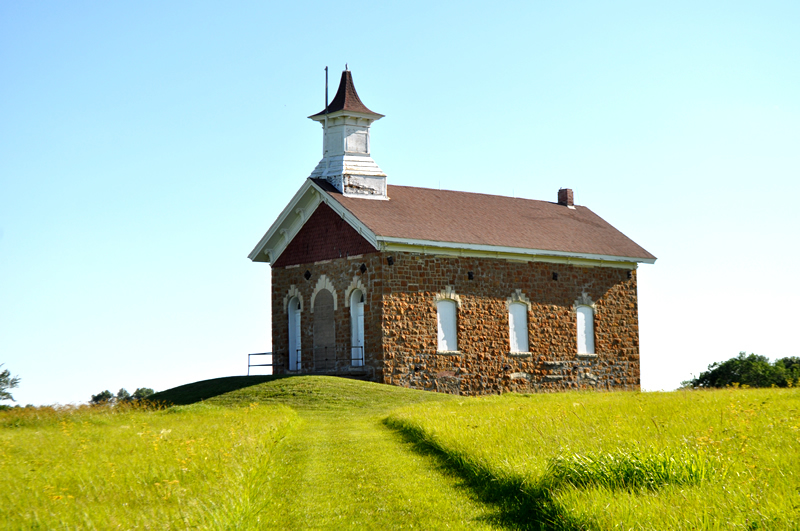

- Location within Kansas Location within the United States
- Location: S. Arvonia Rd, Lebo, Kansas
- Coordinates: 38°28′44″N 95°52′08″W
- Area: less than one acre
- NRHP reference No.: 12000387
- Added to NRHP: July 3, 2012

The Arvonia School, on South Arvonia Road in Lebo, Kansas, was listed on the National Register of Historic Places in 2012.

It is notable as one of the earliest-known architect-designed schools in Kansas. It was designed by architect John Haskell in 1872.

The school was closed in 1949.

It was built originally as a two-story building.

== See also ==
- Kansas one room school
