= Lyndon Carnegie Library =

- U.S. National Register of Historic Places
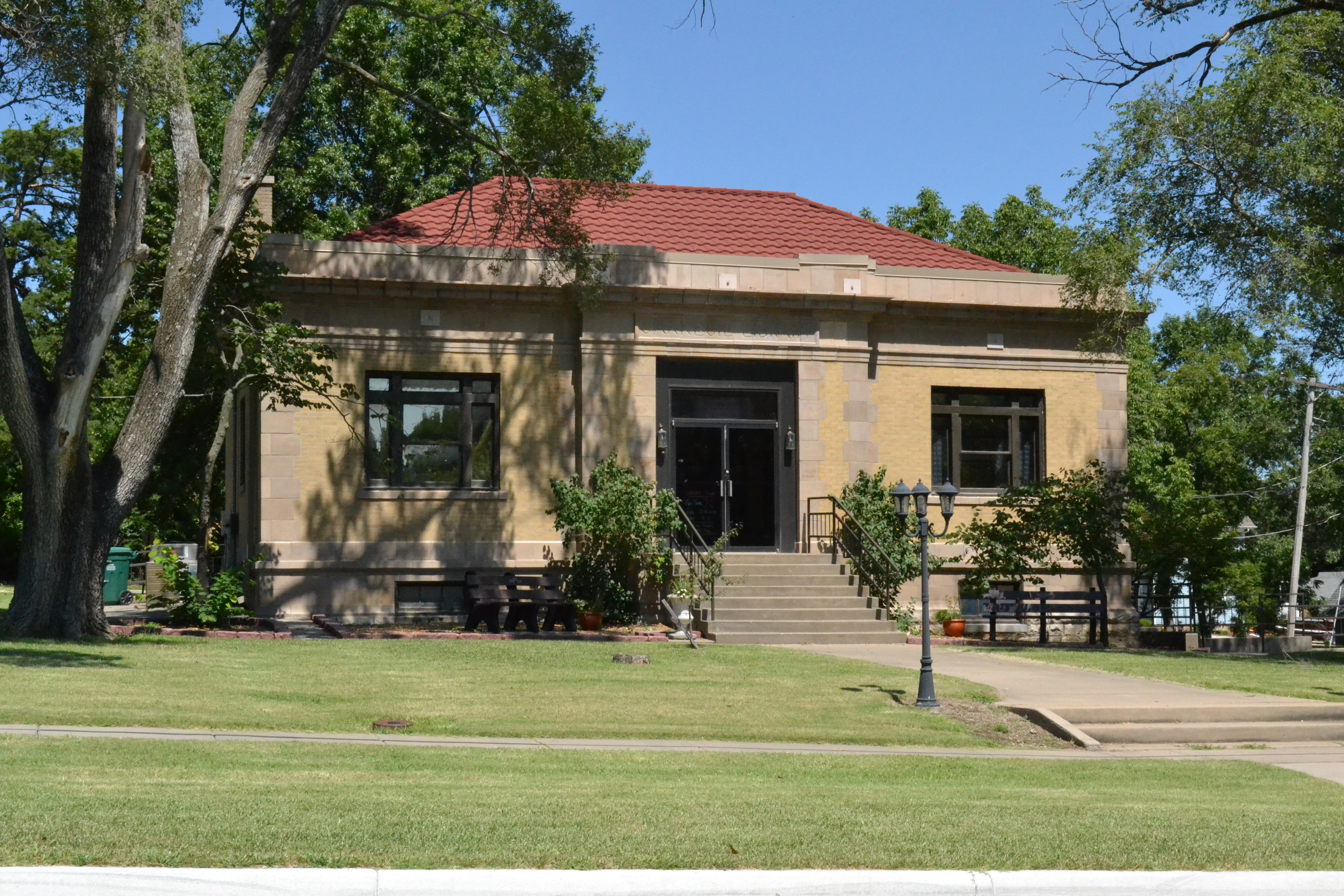
- The Lyndon Carnegie Library in 2017

- Location within Kansas Location within the United States
- Location: 127 E. Sixth, Lyndon, Kansas
- Coordinates: 38°36′27″N 95°40′58″W
- Area: Less than one acre
- Built: c. 1911
- Built by: Reyburn, Laird Construction
- Architect: Keene & Simpson
- Architectural style: Classical Revival
- MPS: Carnegie Libraries of Kansas TR
- NRHP reference No.: 87000965
- Added to NRHP: June 25, 1987

The Lyndon Carnegie Library, located at 127 E. Sixth in Lyndon, Kansas, is a Classical Revival-style Carnegie library which was built in about 1911. It was listed on the National Register of Historic Places in 1987.

It is a one-story, brick and limestone building about 49 by 39 feet (15 m × 12 m) in plan, and faces south. It was funded by an $8,000 Carnegie Foundation grant.
