= Jackson County Courthouse (Independence, Missouri) =

- U.S. National Register of Historic Places
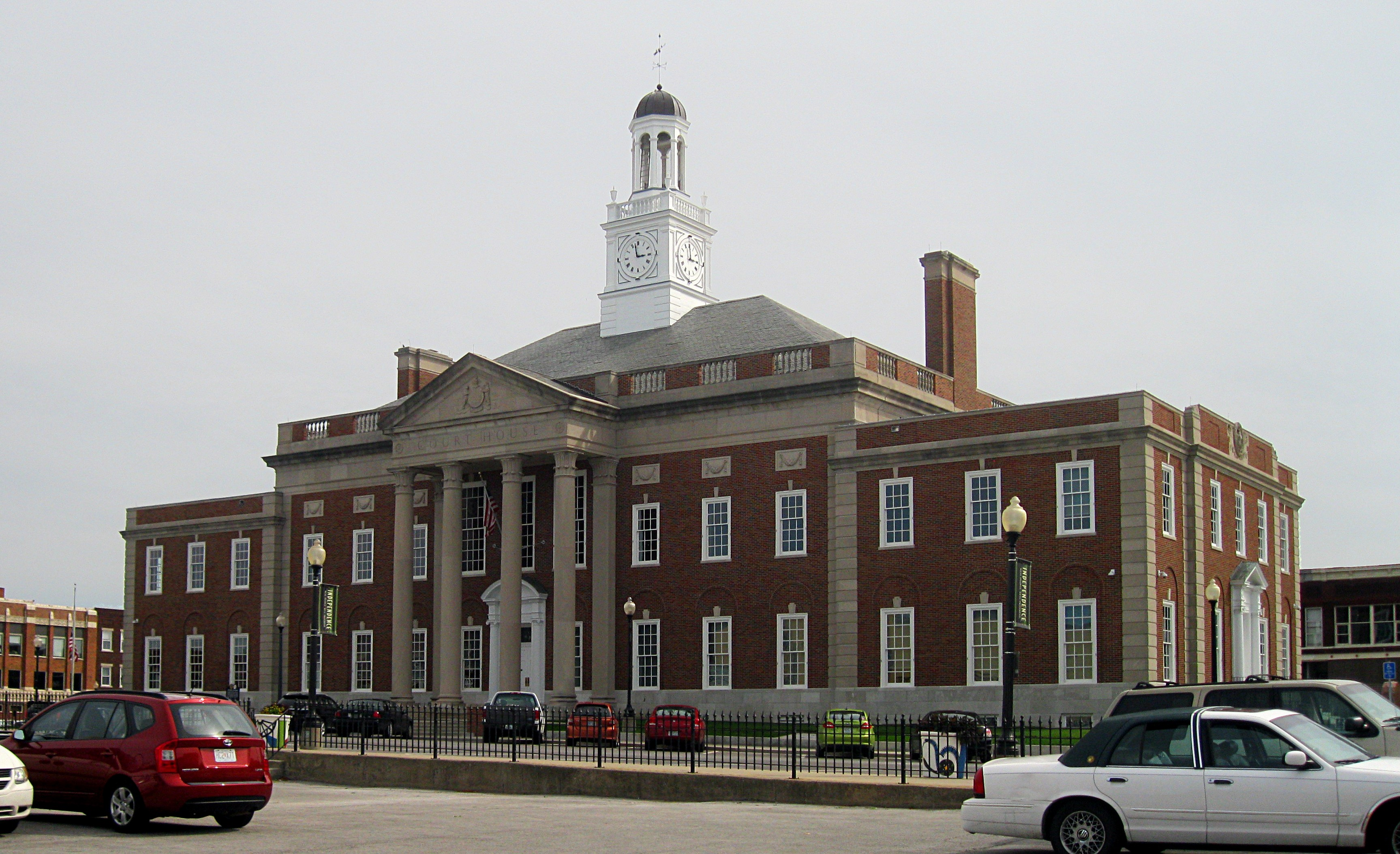

- Location within Missouri Location within the United States
- Interactive map showing the location of Jackson County Courthouse
- Location: 112 W Lexington Ave, Independence, Missouri
- Coordinates: 39°05′33″N 94°24′59″W
- Built: 1836
- Architect: David Frederick Wallace
- Architectural style: Colonial Revival
- NRHP reference No.: 72000713
- Added to NRHP: October 18, 1972

The Jackson County Courthouse, also known as the Truman Courthouse, is a historic courthouse in Independence, Missouri.

In 1922, Harry S. Truman won election as county judge for eastern Jackson County as a candidate of the Tom Pendergast faction of the Democratic Party. He failed to be re-elected in 1924, but, then won election as presiding judge in 1926. Truman served in this position in effect as county commissioner for eight years. He divided his time between the two Jackson County courthouses; this one in Independence, and the Jackson County Courthouse in Kansas City. (Truman later had an office in the Kansas City courthouse during most of his first term as U.S. Senator from 1935 to 1939.)

No county offices are currently in the building. The county offices have moved a few blocks away to the Independence Courthouse Annex, located at 308 W. Kansas. The Jackson County Historical Society office and archives are housed in the building. It underwent a massive renovation to restore President Truman's office and courtroom, and to fix major structural issues.

The courthouse grounds include statues of Presidents Harry S. Truman and Andrew Jackson, and historical markers and monuments commemorate pioneers, the Civil War, and the trails heading west – Santa Fe, California and Oregon trails – that marked the Independence Square as their starting point.

== Jackson County Historical Society ==
The courthouse is now the home of the Jackson County Historical Society. The Society's facilities include a History Center, an Archives and Research Center that is available by appointment, a museum of art, and Harry S Truman Office and Courtroom that is available for guided tours.
