= Osage City, Kansas =

City in Osage County, Kansas

- City
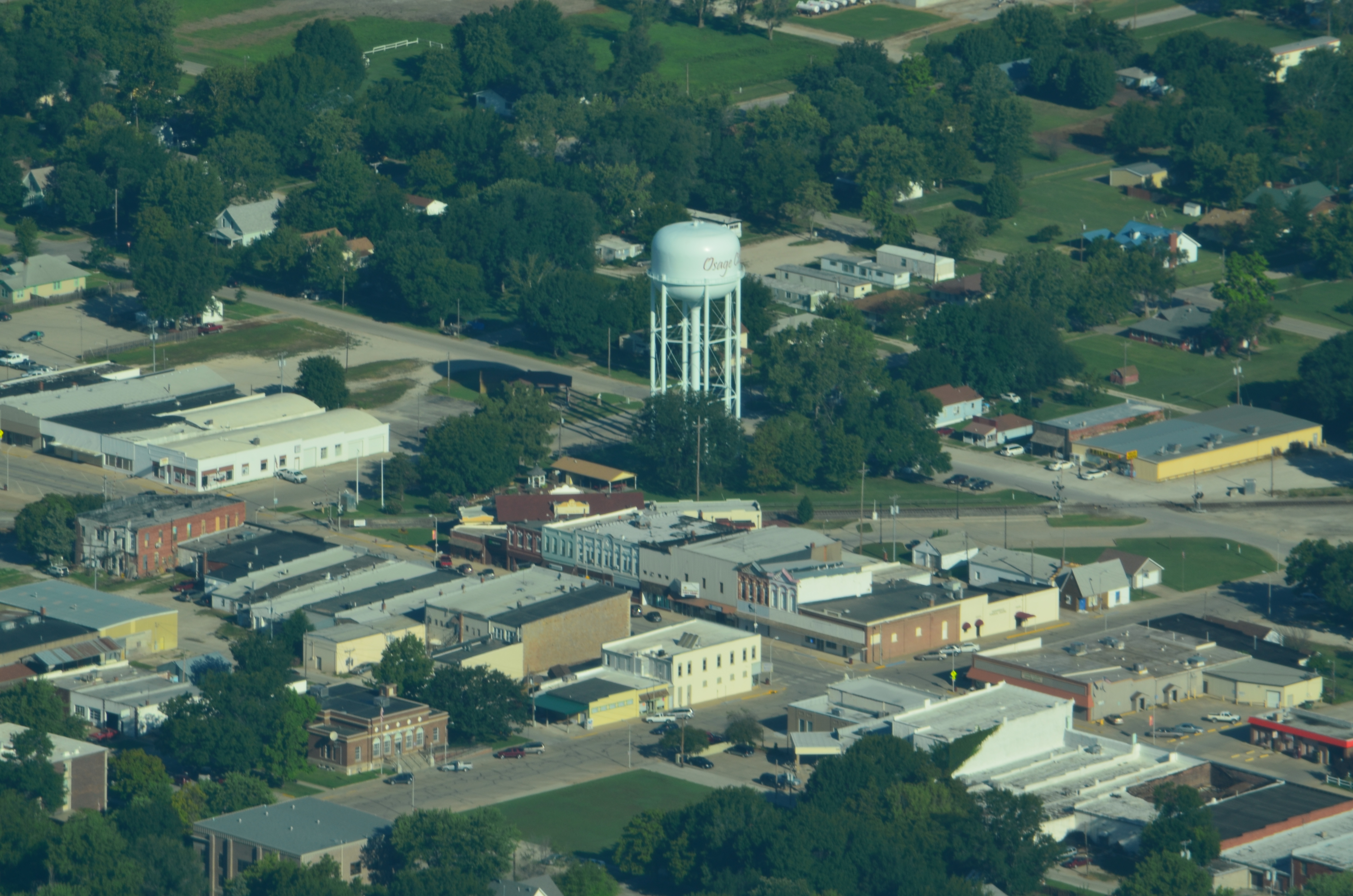
- Aerial view of Osage City (2013)

- Location within Osage County and Kansas

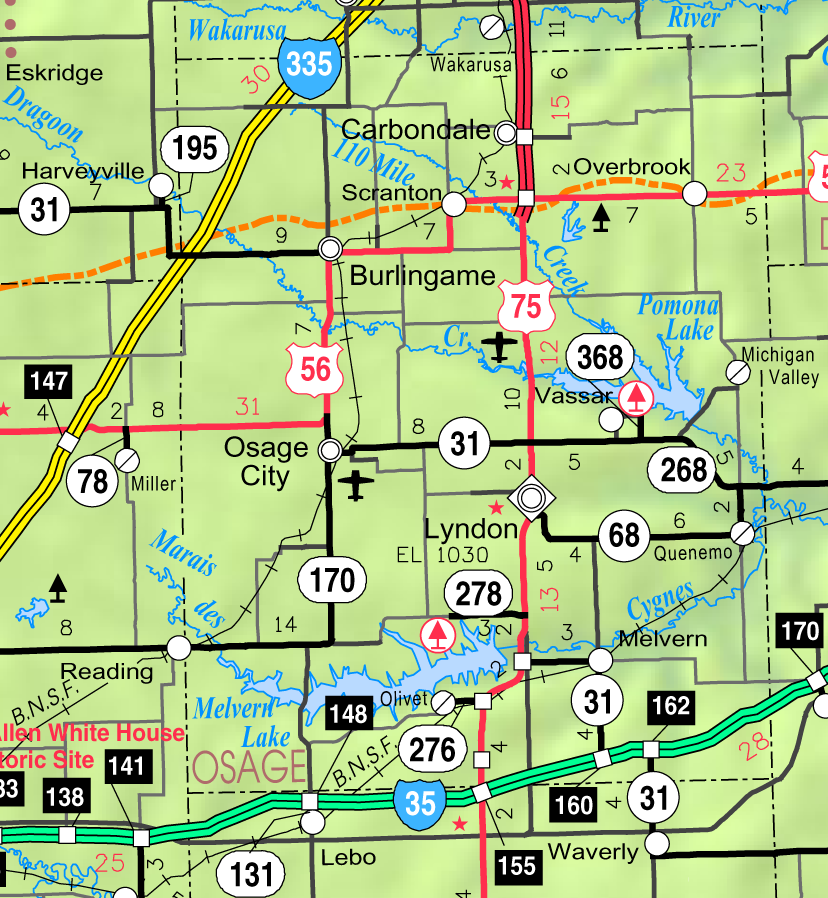
- KDOT map of Osage County (legend)
- Coordinates: 38°38′3″N 95°49′36″W
- Country: United States
- State: Kansas
- County: Osage
- Founded: 1860s
- Platted: 1869
- Incorporated: 1872
- Named for: Osage Nation

Government
  - Type: Mayor–Council
  - Mayor: Brian Stromgren

Area
  - Total: 3.23 sq mi (8.36 km^{2})
  - Land: 3.15 sq mi (8.15 km^{2})
  - Water: 0.077 sq mi (0.20 km^{2})
- Elevation: 1,086 ft (331 m)

Population (2020)
  - Total: 2,861
  - Density: 909/sq mi (351/km^{2})
- Time zone: UTC-6 (CST)
  - Summer (DST): UTC-5 (CDT)
- ZIP Code: 66523
- Area code: 785
- FIPS code: 20-53200
- GNIS ID: 479288
- Website: osagecityks.gov

Osage City is a city in Osage County, Kansas, United States. As of the 2020 census, the population of the city was 2,861.

== History ==
Osage City was surveyed and platted in late 1869, after the route of the Atchison, Topeka and Santa Fe Railway had been fixed, but before it had been built to the city. Osage City was incorporated as a city in April 1872. Like Osage County, the city was named for the Osage Nation.

Osage City was a very busy coal mining town in the 19th century. In the summer of 1870, the first coal mines were opened by the Osage Carbon, Coal & Mining Company. At one time, there were twenty-eight mine shafts and 1,200 men employed.

== Geography ==
Osage City is located at 38°38′3″N 95°49′36″W (38.634069, -95.826759). According to the United States Census Bureau, the city has a total area of 3.29 square miles (8.52 km^{2}), of which 3.21 square miles (8.31 km^{2}) is land and 0.08 square miles (0.21 km^{2}) is water.

=== Climate ===
The climate in this area is characterized by hot, humid summers and generally mild to cool winters. According to the Köppen Climate Classification system, Osage City has a humid subtropical climate, abbreviated "Cfa" on climate maps.

Climate data for Osage City, Kansas (1991–2020)
Month	Jan	Feb	Mar	Apr	May	Jun	Jul	Aug	Sep	Oct	Nov	Dec	Year
Mean daily maximum °F (°C)	40.4 (4.7)	44.6 (7.0)	56.0 (13.3)	65.4 (18.6)	74.5 (23.6)	84.3 (29.1)	89.3 (31.8)	87.7 (30.9)	79.8 (26.6)	68.8 (20.4)	54.4 (12.4)	43.1 (6.2)	65.7 (18.7)
Daily mean °F (°C)	29.1 (−1.6)	33.2 (0.7)	43.8 (6.6)	53.8 (12.1)	64.0 (17.8)	73.5 (23.1)	78.4 (25.8)	76.2 (24.6)	68.0 (20.0)	56.4 (13.6)	43.1 (6.2)	32.2 (0.1)	54.3 (12.4)
Mean daily minimum °F (°C)	17.9 (−7.8)	21.7 (−5.7)	31.6 (−0.2)	42.1 (5.6)	53.5 (11.9)	62.8 (17.1)	67.4 (19.7)	64.6 (18.1)	56.1 (13.4)	44.0 (6.7)	31.7 (−0.2)	21.2 (−6.0)	42.9 (6.1)
Average precipitation inches (mm)	0.83 (21)	1.72 (44)	2.60 (66)	4.03 (102)	5.58 (142)	4.89 (124)	4.24 (108)	4.35 (110)	3.46 (88)	3.17 (81)	2.35 (60)	1.63 (41)	38.85 (987)
Average snowfall inches (cm)	2.4 (6.1)	3.7 (9.4)	1.5 (3.8)	0.1 (0.25)	0.0 (0.0)	0.0 (0.0)	0.0 (0.0)	0.0 (0.0)	0.0 (0.0)	0.1 (0.25)	0.6 (1.5)	2.0 (5.1)	10.4 (26.4)
Source: NOAA

== Demographics ==
Historical population
Census	Pop.	Note	%±
1880	2,098		—
1890	3,469		65.3%
1900	2,792		−19.5%
1910	2,432		−12.9%
1920	2,376		−2.3%
1930	2,402		1.1%
1940	2,079		−13.4%
1950	1,919		−7.7%
1960	2,213		15.3%
1970	2,600		17.5%
1980	2,667		2.6%
1990	2,689		0.8%
2000	3,034		12.8%
2010	2,943		−3.0%
2020	2,861		−2.8%
U.S. Decennial Census

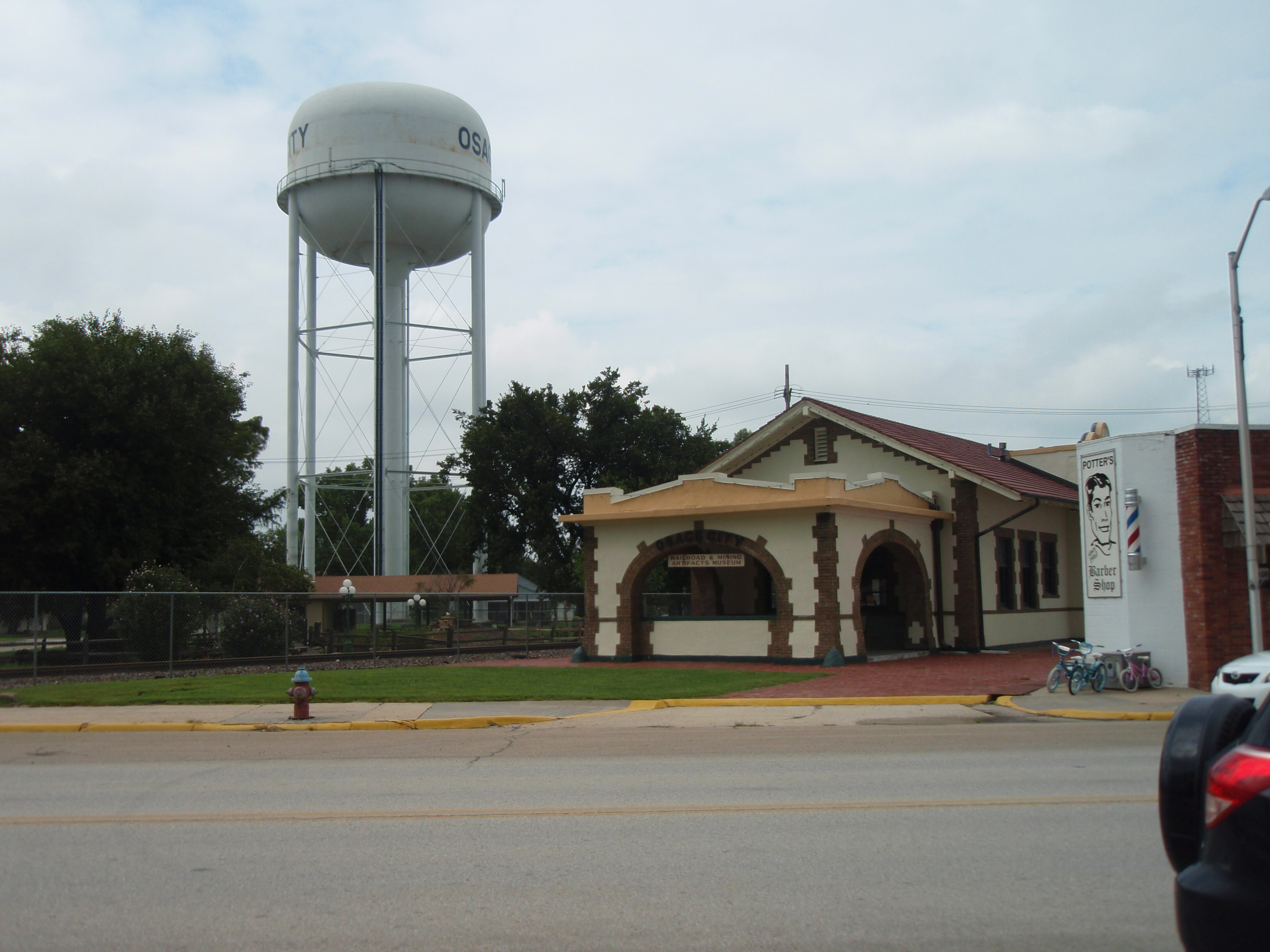
Train Museum and Water Tower (2009)

Osage City is part of the Topeka, Kansas Metropolitan Statistical Area.

=== 2020 census ===
As of the 2020 census, Osage City had a population of 2,861 people in 1,210 households, including 707 families.

The median age was 41.9 years. 24.0% of residents were under the age of 18, 6.9% were from 18 to 24, 22.6% were from 25 to 44, 25.1% were from 45 to 64, and 21.4% were 65 years of age or older. For every 100 females, there were 95.0 males, and for every 100 females age 18 and over there were 88.1 males age 18 and over.

There were 1,210 households in Osage City, of which 27.7% had children under the age of 18 living in them. Of all households, 42.5% were married-couple households, 18.9% were households with a male householder and no spouse or partner present, and 31.8% were households with a female householder and no spouse or partner present. About 36.5% of all households were made up of individuals, and 19.8% had someone living alone who was 65 years of age or older.

There were 1,344 housing units, of which 10.0% were vacant. The homeowner vacancy rate was 2.2% and the rental vacancy rate was 10.9%. The population density was 908.5 per square mile (350.8/km^{2}), and housing density was 426.8 per square mile (164.8/km^{2}).

Racial composition as of the 2020 census
Race	Number	Percent
White	2,646	92.5%
Black or African American	14	0.5%
American Indian and Alaska Native	12	0.4%
Asian	11	0.4%
Native Hawaiian and Other Pacific Islander	0	0.0%
Some other race	38	1.3%
Two or more races	140	4.9%
Hispanic or Latino (of any race)	109	3.8%

Non-Hispanic White residents were 90.74% of the population. 0.0% of residents lived in urban areas, while 100.0% lived in rural areas.

Demographic estimates

The 2016–2020 5-year American Community Survey estimates reported an average household size of 2.2 and an average family size of 2.7. The percent of those with a bachelor's degree or higher was estimated to be 11.8% of the population.

Income and poverty

The 2016–2020 5-year American Community Survey estimates show that the median household income was $39,865 (with a margin of error of +/- $6,572) and the median family income was $54,348 (+/- $16,824). Males had a median income of $29,798 (+/- $6,329) versus $14,493 (+/- $10,219) for females. The median income for those above 16 years old was $25,400 (+/- $9,981). Approximately, 22.0% of families and 24.2% of the population were below the poverty line, including 32.7% of those under the age of 18 and 10.7% of those ages 65 or over.

=== 2010 census ===
As of the 2010 United States census, there were 2,943 people in 1,213 households, including 757 families, in the city. The population density was 916.8 inhabitants per square mile (354.0/km^{2}). There were 1,359 housing units at an average density of 423.4 per square mile (163.5/km^{2}). The racial makeup of the city was 97% White, 0.2% African American, 0.3% Native American, 0.3% Asian, 0.2% from other races, and 2.0% from two or more races. Hispanic or Latino of any race were 3.9% of the population.

Of the 1,213 households 30.2% had children under the age of 18 living with them, 44.8% were married couples living together, 12.8% had a female householder with no husband present, 4.8% had a male householder with no wife present, and 37.6% were non-families. 33.2% of households were one person and 17.4% were one person aged 65 or older. The average household size was 2.34 and the average family size was 2.95.

The median age was 40.8 years. 25.5% of residents were under the age of 18; 6.9% were between the ages of 18 and 24; 21.9% were from 25 to 44; 25.6% were from 45 to 64; and 20.1% were 65 or older. The gender makeup of the city was 47.8% male and 52.2% female.

== Economy ==
Norseman Plastics is located in Osage City. In 2008, Orbis acquired the company, and changed its name.

== Government ==
The Osage City government consists of a city manager, mayor and eight council members. The council meets the 2nd and 4th Tuesday of each month at 7 pm. The Mayor is elected on two year terms and council members on four year terms.

== Education ==
The community is served by Osage City USD 420 public school district.

== Transportation ==
Highway K-31 passes through Osage City, and U.S. Route 56 is located approximately 1 mile (1.6 km) north of Osage City. The closest Kansas Turnpike exit is located approximately 10 miles (16 km) west of Osage City along U.S. Route 56.

Osage City was located on the National Old Trails Road, also known as the Ocean-to-Ocean Highway, that was established in 1912.

== Notable people ==
- C. D. Batchelor, political editorial cartoonist
- Michael P. Ryan, Marine Major general
- Blake Treinen, baseball player
- Ralph T. O'Neil, Commander of the American legion

== See also ==
- National Register of Historic Places listings in Osage County, Kansas
- National Old Trails Road
