= Kearney, Missouri =

City in Clay County, Missouri, United States

- City
- Location of Kearney within Missouri
- Coordinates: 39°21′18″N 94°21′35″W
- Country: United States
- State: Missouri
- County: Clay
- Settled: 1856
- Incorporated: 1869

Government
  - Mayor: Randy Pogue

Area
  - Total: 13.34 sq mi (34.56 km^{2})
  - Land: 13.34 sq mi (34.54 km^{2})
  - Water: 0.0077 sq mi (0.02 km^{2})
- Elevation: 833 ft (254 m)

Population (2020)
  - Total: 10,404
  - Density: 780.3/sq mi (301.26/km^{2})
- Time zone: UTC-6 (Central (CST))
  - Summer (DST): UTC-5 (CDT)
- ZIP code: 64060
- Area codes: 816, 975
- FIPS code: 29-38072
- GNIS feature ID: 2395496
- Website: www.kearneymo.us

Kearney /ˈkɑːrni/ is a city in Clay County, Missouri, United States. As of the 2020 census, Kearney had a population of 10,404. The city was the birthplace of Jesse James, and there is an annual festival in the third weekend of September to recognize the outlaw. It is part of the Kansas City metropolitan area.

== History ==
Kearney was unofficially founded in the spring of 1856 by David T. Duncan and W. R. Cave, and was originally called Centerville. Centerville was composed of what is now the southeastern portion of the town. In 1867, John Lawrence began laying out plans for another small settlement around the newly established Kansas City and Cameron Railroad subsidiary of the Hannibal and Saint Joseph Railroad which was to build the Hannibal Bridge establishing Kansas City, Missouri as the dominant city in the region. The president of the railroad was Charles E. Kearney (although there is speculation that it was named after Kearney, Nebraska). The railroad still operates as the Burlington Northern and Santa Fe Railway. As they grew, the two settlements of Centerville and Kearney were effectively merged, and the town of Kearney, Missouri was officially incorporated in 1869.

The Claybrook House (since destroyed in a fire) and James Brothers' House and Farm are listed on the National Register of Historic Places.

== Geography ==
Kearney is located in north central Clay County northeast of the Kansas City metropolitan area. According to the United States Census Bureau, the city has a total area of 12.92 square miles (33.46 km^{2}), of which 12.91 square miles (33.44 km^{2}) is land and 0.01 square miles (0.03 km^{2}) is water.

=== Climate ===
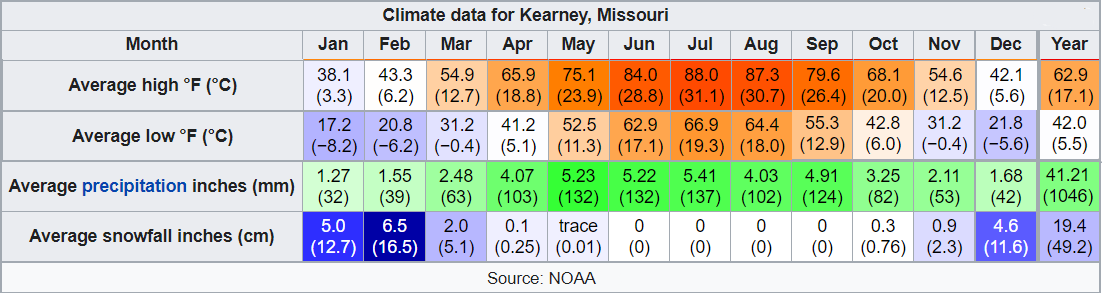
NOAA climate normals, 1991-2020 for Kearney, MO

Kearney lies in the humid continental climate zone, typical of the Midwestern United States. It experiences cold, snowy winters, and warm to hot, humid summers. The city lies in Tornado Alley, a region of the United States that is extremely prone to tornadoes and severe thunderstorms. Generally, most of this severe weather activity occurs in the spring and summer, although severe weather can and has occurred even in the winter months.

== Demographics ==
Historical population
Census	Pop.	Note	%±
1870	396		—
1880	464		17.2%
1890	588		26.7%
1900	621		5.6%
1910	631		1.6%
1920	625		−1.0%
1930	523		−16.3%
1940	543		3.8%
1950	570		5.0%
1960	678		18.9%
1970	984		45.1%
1980	1,433		45.6%
1990	1,790		24.9%
2000	5,472		205.7%
2010	8,381		53.2%
2020	10,404		24.1%
U.S. Decennial Census

=== Racial and ethnic composition ===
Kearney city, Missouri – Racial and ethnic composition Note: the US Census treats Hispanic/Latino as an ethnic category. This table excludes Latinos from the racial categories and assigns them to a separate category. Hispanics/Latinos may be of any race.
Race / Ethnicity (NH = Non-Hispanic)	Pop 2000	Pop 2010	Pop 2020	% 2000	% 2010	% 2020
White alone (NH)	5,273	7,889	9,357	96.36%	94.13%	89.94%
Black or African American alone (NH)	22	31	62	0.40%	0.37%	0.60%
Native American or Alaska Native alone (NH)	14	30	39	0.26%	0.36%	0.37%
Asian alone (NH)	14	33	80	0.26%	0.39%	0.77%
Native Hawaiian or Pacific Islander alone (NH)	3	8	2	0.05%	0.10%	0.02%
Other race alone (NH)	0	5	30	0.00%	0.06%	0.29%
Mixed race or Multiracial (NH)	54	111	477	0.99%	1.32%	4.58%
Hispanic or Latino (any race)	92	274	357	1.68%	3.27%	3.43%
Total	5,472	8,381	10,404	100.00%	100.00%	100.00%

=== 2020 census ===
As of the 2020 census, Kearney had a population of 10,404. The population density was 780.5 per square mile (301.2/km^{2}). The median age was 37.5 years. 27.4% of residents were under the age of 18 and 14.8% of residents were 65 years of age or older. For every 100 females there were 95.8 males, and for every 100 females age 18 and over there were 90.8 males age 18 and over.

97.7% of residents lived in urban areas, while 2.3% lived in rural areas.

There were 3,831 households and 2,856 families in Kearney. Of the households, 39.1% had children under the age of 18 living in them. Of all households, 59.0% were married-couple households, 12.3% were households with a male householder and no spouse or partner present, and 23.0% were households with a female householder and no spouse or partner present. About 22.6% of all households were made up of individuals and 12.0% had someone living alone who was 65 years of age or older. The average household size was 2.8 and the average family size was 3.2.

There were 4,002 housing units at an average density of 302.0 per square mile (116.6/km^{2}), of which 4.3% were vacant. The homeowner vacancy rate was 2.2% and the rental vacancy rate was 4.4%.

Racial composition as of the 2020 census
Race	Number	Percent
White	9,476	91.1%
Black or African American	65	0.6%
American Indian and Alaska Native	42	0.4%
Asian	81	0.8%
Native Hawaiian and Other Pacific Islander	2	0.0%
Some other race	109	1.0%
Two or more races	629	6.0%

=== Income and poverty ===
The 2016–2020 5-year American Community Survey estimates show that the median household income was $85,499 (with a margin of error of +/- $8,205) and the median family income was $95,129 (+/- $5,308). Males had a median income of $49,854 (+/- $5,008) versus $32,372 (+/- $8,865) for females. The median income for those above 16 years old was $43,343 (+/- $3,368). Approximately, 2.3% of families and 2.9% of the population were below the poverty line, including 1.9% of those under the age of 18 and 6.3% of those ages 65 or over.

=== 2010 census ===
As of the census of 2010, there were 8,381 people, 2,978 households, and 2,270 families living in the city. The population density was 649.2 inhabitants per square mile (250.7/km^{2}). There were 3,120 housing units at an average density of 241.7 per square mile (93.3/km^{2}). The racial makeup of the city was 96.2% White, 0.4% African American, 0.4% Native American, 0.4% Asian, 0.1% Pacific Islander, 0.8% from other races, and 1.8% from two or more races. Hispanic or Latino of any race were 3.3% of the population.

There were 2,978 households, of which 47.0% had children under the age of 18 living with them, 60.3% were married couples living together, 11.6% had a female householder with no husband present, 4.3% had a male householder with no wife present, and 23.8% were non-families. 19.2% of all households were made up of individuals, and 8.9% had someone living alone who was 65 years of age or older. The average household size was 2.81 and the average family size was 3.23.

The median age in the city was 33.2 years. 32% of residents were under the age of 18; 6.8% were between the ages of 18 and 24; 30.6% were from 25 to 44; 21.4% were from 45 to 64; and 9.1% were 65 years of age or older. The gender makeup of the city was 48.1% male and 51.9% female.

=== 2000 census ===
As of the census of 2000, there were 5,472 people, 1,910 households, and 1,495 families living in the city. The population density was 833.2 inhabitants per square mile (321.7/km^{2}). There were 1,995 housing units at an average density of 303.8 per square mile (117.3/km^{2}). The racial makeup of the city was 98.3% White, 0.90% African American, 0.4% Native American, 0.2% Asian, 0.55% from other races, and 1.15% from two or more races. Hispanic or Latino of any race were 1.9% of the population.

There were 1,910 households, out of which 49.2% had children under the age of 18 living with them, 63.9% were married couples living together, 10.9% had a female householder with no husband present, and 21.7% were non-families. 18.5% of all households were made up of individuals, and 7.8% had someone living alone who was 65 years of age or older. The average household size was 2.84 and the average family size was 3.24.

In the city the population was spread out, with 33.6% under the age of 18, 6.4% from 18 to 24, 35.4% from 25 to 44, 16.3% from 45 to 64, and 8.4% who were 65 years of age or older. The median age was 31 years. For every 100 females, there were 93.7 males. For every 100 females age 18 and over, there were 89.7 males.

The median income for a household in the city was $56,603, and the median income for a family was $64,540. Males had a median income of $45,721 versus $26,739 for females. The per capita income for the city was $21,147. About 1.8% of families and 2.5% of the population were below the poverty line, including 2.3% of those under age 18 and 5.8% of those age 65 or over.

== Education ==
Kearney R-I School District, which covers the vast majority of the municipality, operates an early childhood center, four elementary schools, one middle school, one junior high, and Kearney High School.

A small portion of the city limits is in the Excelsior Springs 40 School District.

Kearney has a public library, a branch of the Mid-Continent Public Library.

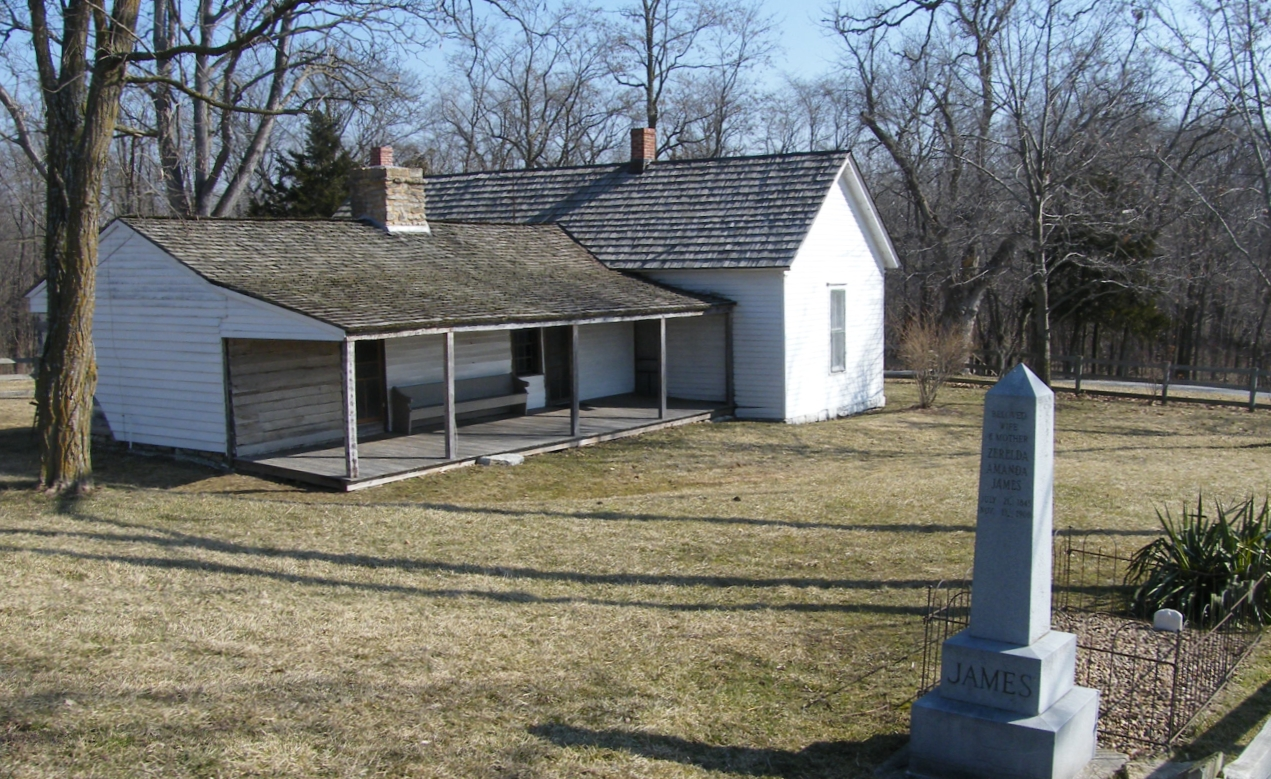
Jesse James's Farm

== Notable people ==
On September 5, 1847, Jesse James was born on the James farm, where his family resided to the northeast of the site on which Kearney would eventually be established. James formed the infamous James-Younger gang in 1866, which operated until the Younger brothers were captured in 1876. James formed a new gang in 1879 and continued until his death on April 3, 1882, when he was shot by fellow gang-member Robert Ford. He was buried on his farm, but now rests in Mt. Olivet Cemetery in Kearney.

== See also ==
- List of cities in Missouri
