= New York Life Insurance Building =

New York Life Insurance Building or New York Life Building may refer to:

- New York Life Insurance Building (Montreal)
- New York Life Insurance Building (Chicago), Illinois
- New York Life Building (Kansas City, Missouri)
- New York Life Building at 51 Madison Avenue, New York City
- The former New York Life Insurance Company Building at 346 Broadway, now 108 Leonard, New York City
- The former New York Life Insurance Company Building, now the Omaha National Bank Building, Omaha, Nebraska
