= Kansas City Club =

Historical gentlemen's club of Kansas City, Missouri

Coordinates: 39.102931°N 94.584405°W

The Kansas City Club
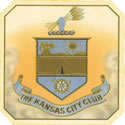
- Type: Private club
- Founded: 1882; 144 years ago
- Defunct: 2015; 11 years ago
- Headquarters: 918 Baltimore Avenue; Kansas City, Missouri 64105
- Website: kansascityclub.com

The Kansas City Club, founded in 1882 and currently located on tree-lined one-way Baltimore in the Library District of Downtown Kansas City, Missouri, was the oldest gentlemen's club in Missouri. The club began admitting women members in 1975. Along with the River Club on nearby Quality Hill, it was one of two surviving private city clubs on the Missouri side of Kansas City. Notable members include Presidents Harry Truman and Dwight D. Eisenhower, General Omar Bradley, and political boss Tom Pendergast. It closed in 2015 but after years of extensive renovations, updating and decor additions it is re-opening in 2026.

== KC Clubhouse ==
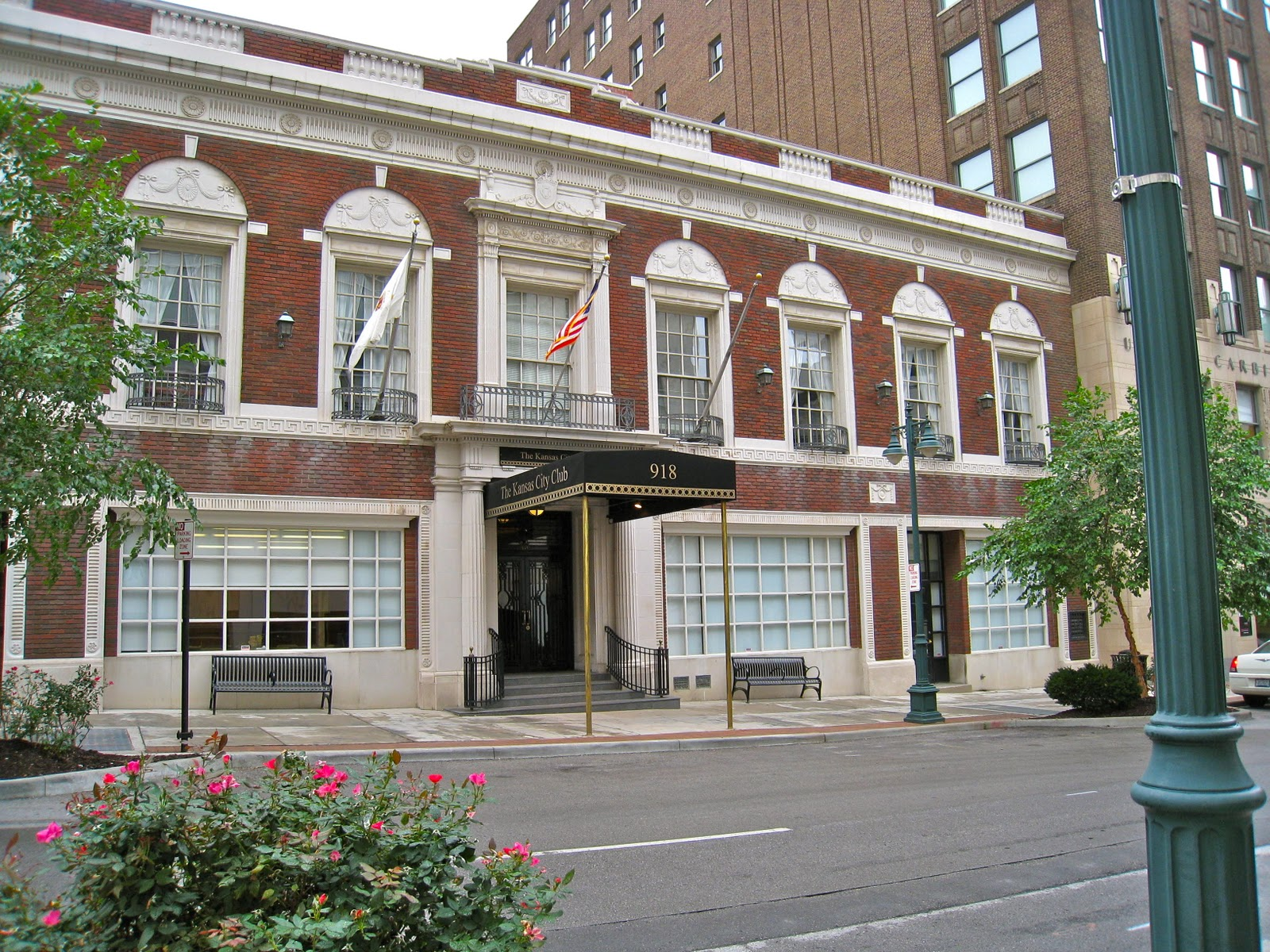
Main entrance on Baltimore Avenue

The former clubhouse is a neoclassical masonry and reinforced concrete building at 918 Baltimore Avenue, which was designed by John McKecknie and built in 1922. It is at the corner of Ninth Street across Baltimore Avenue from the Central Library and across Ninth Street from the New York Life Building. The clubhouse was originally home to the University Club of Kansas City from 1922 to 2001 when the Kansas City Club membership merged with the University Club at the 918 Baltimore location.

The four-story clubhouse contained a dining room, a pub, a library, a cigar stand, full-service athletic facilities, and banquet and meeting facilities including a lounge, a ballroom, and private conference rooms. Two inner clubs had their own private lounge and bar spaces for their own members. The athletic facilities included cardio, weight, and strength training equipment, a trainer, a masseuse, hot tubs, steam rooms, saunas, a racquetball court, and two squash courts. Along with the University of Missouri-Kansas City and the Pembroke Hill School, the Kansas City Club was one of only three locations in Kansas City with squash facilities.

== History ==
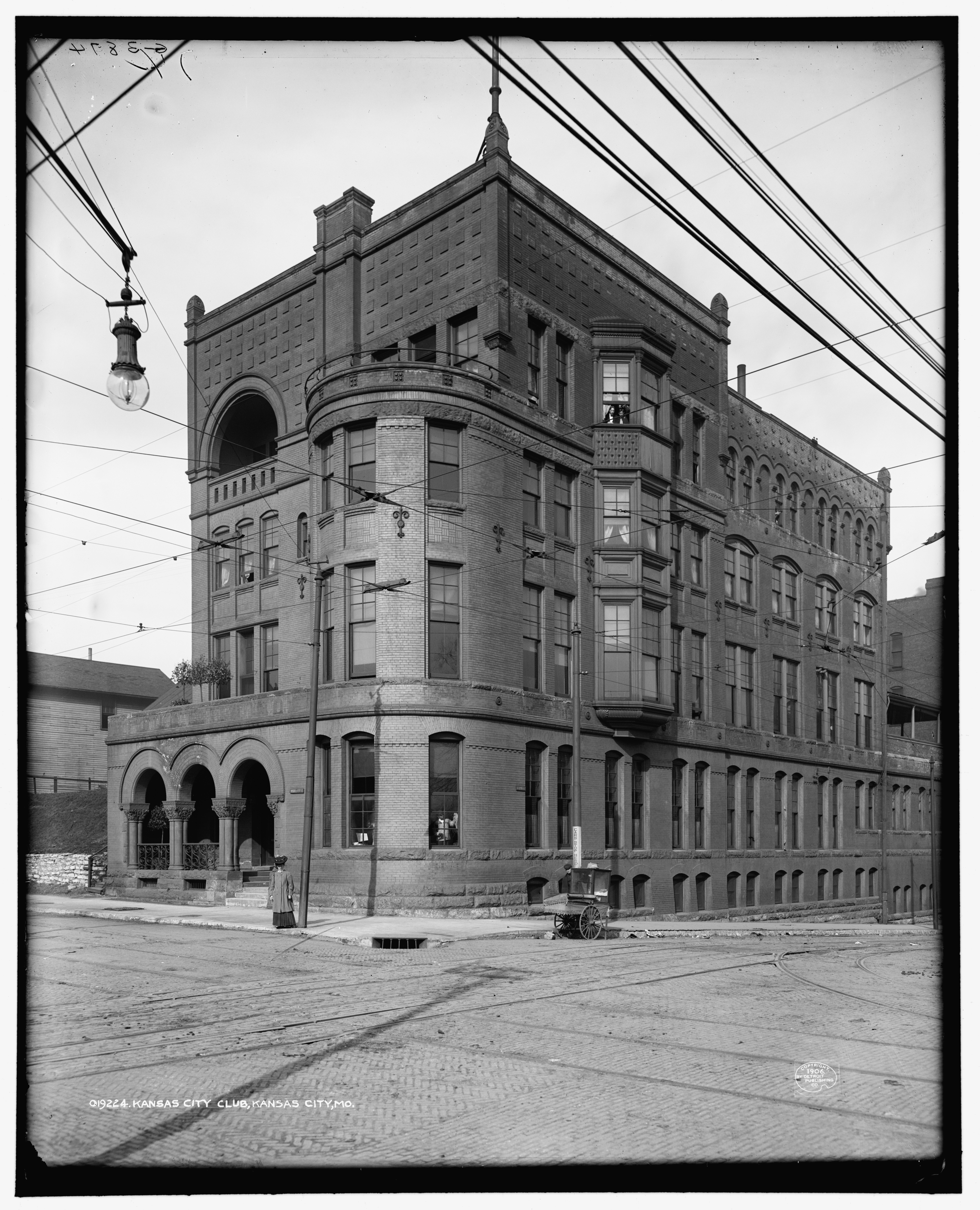
Clubhouse, 1888-1922

After the Civil War, most of Kansas City's social clubs were pro-Confederate. A group of prominent local businessmen and professionals, including Edward H. Allen, Victor B. Bell, Alden J. Blethen, Thomas B. Bullene, Gardiner Lathrop, August Meyer, Leander J. Talbott, William Warner, and Robert T. Van Horn, decided to provide an alternative, and organized the Kansas City Club on November 10, 1882. Initially, the club met at Kersey Coates's hotel on Quality Hill. In 1888, the club moved into its first clubhouse, a brick building at the corner of 12th and Wyandotte Streets.

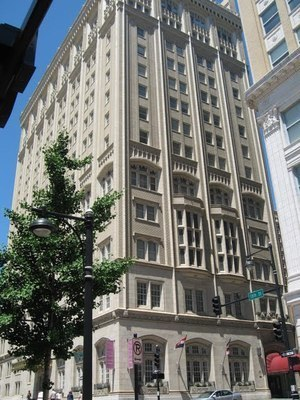
Clubhouse, 1922-2001

In 1922, having absorbed several other clubs, and with a membership of more than 600, the club built a 14-story beaux arts clubhouse (the Kansas City Club Building) at the corner of Thirteenth Street and Baltimore Avenue, designed by local architect, Charles A. Smith. The clubhouse included a large dining room, several bars, private meeting rooms, a banquet hall, athletic facilities, an indoor pool, six floors of guestrooms, and a rooftop terrace. The club quickly grew and entered into reciprocal arrangements with many other prominent clubs worldwide. Membership was opened to women in 1975.

In 1987, the club had 2,180 members. By 2001, membership had dwindled to less than 900. The club attributed this to the Tax Reform Act of 1986, which made private club dues non-deductible, and to cultural shifts of young professionals away from joining clubs. The clubhouse also needed upgrades to its facilities that would have cost between $5 million and $10 million.

Finally, effective July 31, 2001, the club agreed to merge with the University Club, a 100-year-old men's social club with 200 members at the corner of Ninth Street and Baltimore Avenue, and purchase the University Club's facilities, which were smaller and cost only $1 million to upgrade. In 2002, a developer bought the Kansas City Club's 1922 building and turned it into loft apartments and a banquet hall, renaming it the Clubhouse on Baltimore.

Since 2010, the club has lent space to Washington University in St. Louis's Olin Business School local "Executive MBA" program. In November 2012, the club celebrated its 130th anniversary with a charity gala.

After 133 years, the Kansas City Club closed on Saturday, May 23, 2015. Epoch Developments, from Denver, bought the facility out of bankruptcy in mid-2015 and spent millions of dollars renovating, improving, upgrading the systems, and returning the facility to initially use as a private venue for corporate gatherings, weddings, and now re-emerging as the premier social gathering spot in Downtown; exquisite dining venues, social settings, experiences, sports lounge (theater, golf simulator, full bar), barber, more and more to come!

== Notable members ==
- Edward H. Allen, 10th Mayor of Kansas City (1867–68)
- Victor B. Bell, lumber magnate
- Richard L. Berkley, 50th Mayor of Kansas City (1979–91)
- Alden J. Blethen, newspaper publisher
- Pasco Bowman, judge, United States Court of Appeals for the Eighth Circuit (1983-2003)
- Omar Bradley, senior U.S. Army field commander in North Africa and Europe during World War II
- Thomas B. Bullene, owner of the Emery, Bird, Thayer Dry Goods Company, 22nd Mayor of Kansas City (1882–83)
- Kersey Coates, early Kansas City hotel magnate
- Harry Darby, U.S. Senator from Kansas (1949–50)
- Dwight D. Eisenhower, 34th President of the United States (1953–61)
- John B. Gage, 45th Mayor of Kansas City (1940–46)
- Ewing Kauffman, pharmaceutical magnate and owner of the Kansas City Royals
- Charles E. Kearney, early railroad magnate
- R. Crosby Kemper, banker and philanthropist
- R. Crosby Kemper Jr., banker and philanthropist
- Robert A. Long, lumber magnate
- August Meyer, mining magnate
- Ralph Leroy Nafziger, founder of Hostess Brands
- Tom Pendergast, Democratic Party political boss
- Charles H. Price II, businessman, U.S. Ambassador to Belgium (1981–83), U.S. Ambassador to the United Kingdom (1983–89)
- James A. Reed, U.S. Senator from Missouri (1911–29), 32nd Mayor of Kansas City (1900–04)
- Jack Steadman, Kansas City Chiefs general manager (1966–76), president (1976–89), chairman (1989-2005), and vice-chairman (2005–07)
- Leander J. Talbott, realtor and politician, 24th Mayor of Kansas City (1884–85)
- Joseph P. Teasdale, 48th Governor of Missouri (1977–81)
- Harry S. Truman, 33rd President of the United States (1945–53), 34th Vice President of the United States (1945), U.S. Senator from Missouri (1935–45)
- Robert T. Van Horn, lawyer, U.S. Representative from Missouri (1865–71), 6th Mayor of Kansas City (1861–62, 1863–65)
- William Warner, lawyer, U.S. Senator from Missouri (1905–11), U.S. Representative from Missouri (1885–89), 13th Mayor of Kansas City (1871–72)
- William L. Webster, 39th Missouri Attorney General (1985–93)
- Charles Evans Whittaker, Associate Justice of the Supreme Court of the United States (1957–62)
- David Wysong, Kansas politician

== See also ==
- List of American gentlemen's clubs
- Kansas City Athletic Club
- Kansas City Country Club
- Missouri Athletic Club
