= Library District (Kansas City, Missouri) =

District in Kansas City

Coordinates: 39°06′10″N 94°35′02″W

The Central Library, from which the district takes its name

The Library District is an officially designated neighborhood in Downtown Kansas City, Missouri, United States, roughly bounded by 9th and 11th Streets on the north and south and Main Street and Broadway on the east and west. The District contains a sub-district named the West Ninth Street/Baltimore Avenue Historic District listed on the National Register and which includes several buildings individually listed on the National Register of Historic Places. It also contains other notable structures not listed on the National Register.

== History ==
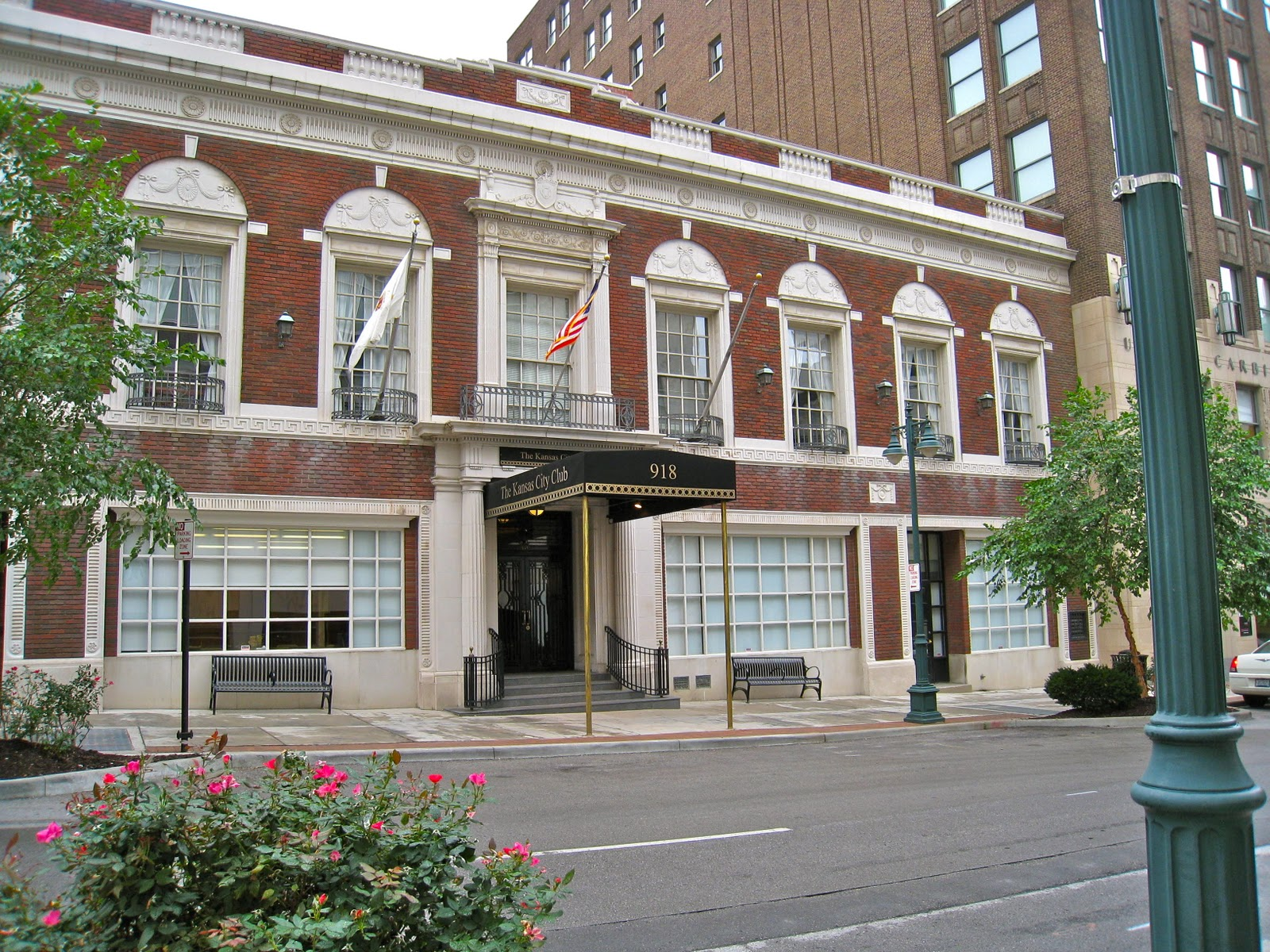
The Kansas City Club on Baltimore Avenue

Originally developed as a commercial and entertainment area in the 1880s, the Library District took its new name in 2003 in connection with the move of the Kansas City Public Library's Central Branch to the former headquarters of the First National Bank of Kansas City, presently the Central Library. At the same time, many commercial office buildings nearby were converted to loft apartment residences and the City of Kansas City initiated major streetscape improvements within the district. Together, these changes established a distinctive character for the neighborhood.

== Distinctive features ==
The Library District has a walking tour guide available through the Kansas City Public Library's website. The walking tour guide begins at the steps of the Library's public garage on 10th Street, between Wyandotte Street and Baltimore Avenue.

=== Library district buildings on the National Register of Historic Places ===
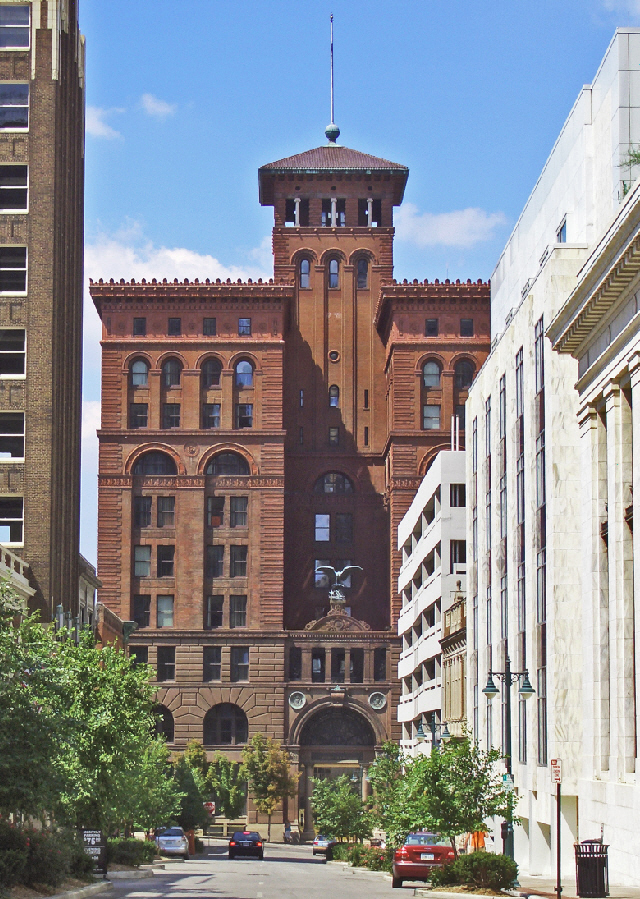
The New York Life Building

- Central Library (First National Bank Building, 1880)
- Bunker Building (1881)
- Old New England Building (1887–88)
- New York Life Building (1888)
- Savoy Hotel and Grill (1888)
- Graphic Arts Building (1917)
- Land Bank Building (1923–24)

=== Other historic Library District buildings ===
- The Kansas City Club (The University Club of Kansas City, 1922)
- The Kansas City School of Law (1926)

=== The Kansas City Library District Garage "Community Bookshelf" ===
Library District Garage and Kansas City Club

The Central Library's parking garage has a distinctive facade on 10th Street, using images of 22 9-meter-high bookspines to create a "community bookshelf." The garage was created by architect Brian M. Finn when he was with the architectural firm CDFM2 in 2003. The signage firm Dimensional Innovations made the Mylar bookends and postcard images, and local residents got to choose which titles would be represented in the bookshelf. The Wyandotte Street facade includes enlarged historic postcards with images of 10th Street and 9th Street from the early 1900s. The Baltimore Avenue facade next to the Kansas City Club includes giant banners with images of the Great Hall of the Library of Congress' Jefferson Building and a fanciful image of a gathering of famous Kansas Citians in an architectural fantasy by local artist Bob Holloway. The 22 "Community Bookshelf" book titles (in order from West to East on 10th street):

- Kansas City Stories, Volume I
  - Kansas City, Missouri; Its History and Its People 1808-1908 (Carrie Westlake Whitney) 1908
  - Tom’s Town, Kansas City and the Pendergast Legend (William M. Reddig) 1986
  - Goin’ to Kansas City (Nathan W. Pearson, Jr.) 1987
  - Farm: A Year in the Life of an American Farmer (Rhodes) 1989
  - Mr. Anonymous, the Story of William Volker (Herbert C. Cornuelle) 1951
  - Kansas City, Missouri: An Architectural History, 1826 - 1990 (George Ehrlich) 1992
  - Journeys Through Time: A Young Traveler’s Guide to Kansas City’s History (Monroe Dodd, Daniel Serda) 2000
- Kansas City Stories, Volume II
  - Virgil Thomson, a Reader: Selected Writings 1924-1984 (Thomson) 2002
  - Mrs. Bridge (Connell) 1959
  - I Was Right on Time (O'Neil) 1996
  - The O’Donnells (Peggy Sullivan) 1956
  - Independence Avenue (Eileen Sherman) 1990
  - Stella Louella’s Runaway Book (Lisa Campbell Ernst) 1998
  - PrairyErth: (A Deep Map) (Least Heat-Moon) 1991
  - Messages from my Father (Calvin Trillin) 1996
- Catch-22 (Heller)
- Children's Stories
  - Goodnight Moon (Brown, pictures by Hurd)
  - Harold and the Purple Crayon (Johnson)
  - Winnie the Pooh (Milne)
  - Green Eggs and Ham (Dr. Seuss)
  - What a Wonderful World (Weiss, Thiele, pictures by Bryan) 1995
  - Little House on the Prairie (Wilder)
  - The Wonderful Wizard of Oz (Baum)
  - M. C. Higgins, the Great (Hamilton)
- Silent Spring (Carson)
- O Pioneers! (Cather)
- Cien Años de Soledad (García Márquez)
- Their Eyes Were Watching God (Hurston)
- Fahrenheit 451 (Bradbury)
- The Republic (Plato)
- The Adventures of Huckleberry Finn (Twain)

(Building Entrance)

- Tao Te Ching (Lao Tzu)
- The Collected Poems of Langston Hughes (Hughes)
- Black Elk Speaks (Neihardt)
- Invisible Man (Ellison)
- To Kill a Mockingbird (Lee)
- Journals of the Expedition (Lewis, Clark) + Undaunted Courage (Ambrose)
- The Lord of the Rings (Tolkien)
- A Tale of Two Cities (Dickens)
- Charlotte's Web (White)
- Romeo and Juliet (Shakespeare)
- Truman (McCullough)
