= Irene H. Ruiz =

American librarian

- Born: 1920; San Antonio, Texas
- Died: September 3rd, 2023 (age 102)
- Education: Emporia State University
- Occupation: Librarian
- Employer: Kansas City Public Library

Irene H. Ruiz was an American librarian. Ruiz was responsible for the creation of one of the only oral history collections documenting the experiences of Mexican immigrants coming to Kansas City.

== Early life ==
Irene H. Ruiz was born in Texas in 1920.

== Career ==
Ruiz worked during World War II for the United States government as a spy. She spoke three languages and listened in on phone calls.

Ruiz and her husband moved to Kansas City in the 1960's; she first worked as a teacher, but eventually left to work as a librarian. She enrolled at Emporia Kansas State College, now known as Emporia State University. Ruiz worked at the Kansas City Public Library's West Branch from 1976 for twenty years. Ruiz began collecting materials in Spanish to support the population nearby.

== Legacy ==
The Kansas City Public Library's West Branch was renamed Irene H. Ruiz Biblioteca de las Americas in her honor in September 2001. It is one of the only bilingual libraries in the Kansas City area. As of September of 2025, the library still supports a growing bilingual collection, adding over 200 titles in that year.
