= Kansas City and Cameron Railroad =

Defunct American subsidiary railroad

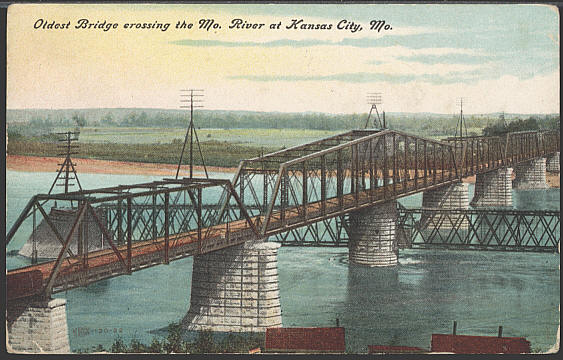
Hannibal and St. Joseph Railroad Bridge over Missouri River at Kansas City from 1908 postcard. This bridge was replaced in 1917.

The Kansas City and Cameron Railroad was a subsidiary railroad in the United States. The railroad was the subsidiary of the Hannibal and St. Joseph Railroad which built the first bridge across the Missouri River at the Hannibal Bridge.

The bridge established Kansas City, Missouri rather than Leavenworth, Kansas or St. Joseph, Missouri as the dominant city in the region.

The Hannibal and St. Joseph was the first railroad to cross the state of Missouri and it carried mail for the Pony Express. However, when it was time to build a bridge across the river, Robert T. Van Horn, Kersey Coates and Charles E. Kearney put together a package to persuade the railroad to create a cutoff 50 miles east of St. Joseph at Cameron, Missouri to go to Kansas City to hook up with lines going on to Texas. Kearney was the subsidiary's first president.
