= Central Library (Kansas City, Missouri) =

Library building in Kansas City

- Central Library (Kansas City Public Library)
- U.S. National Register of Historic Places
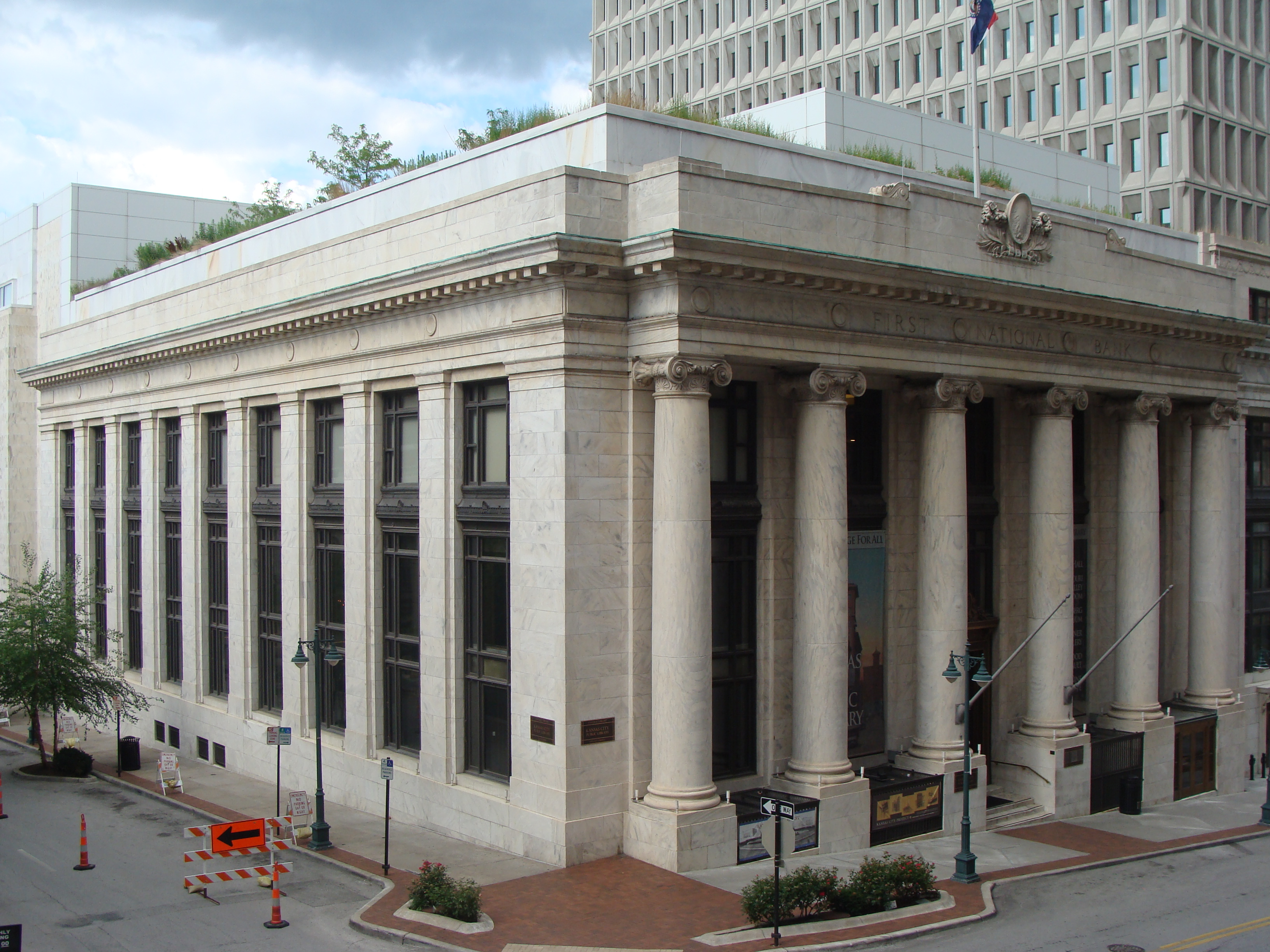
- Kansas City Public Library, Central Branch

- Location within Missouri
- Location: 14 W. 10th St. @ 500 E. 9th St., Kansas City, Missouri
- Coordinates: 39°6′13″N 94°34′35″W
- Built: 1895
- Architect: Hackney, W.F.; Et al.
- Architectural style: Late 19th And 20th Century Revivals, Second Renaissance Revival
- NRHP reference No.: 77000807
- Added to NRHP: May 23, 1977

The Central Library is the main library of the Kansas City Public Library system, which is located in the Library District of Downtown Kansas City, Missouri, United States. It is situated at 14 West 10th Street, at the corner of West 10th Street and Baltimore Avenue, across Baltimore Avenue from the Kansas City Club and up from the New York Life Building. It contains the administration of Kansas City's library system.

The building originally housed the First National Bank, built in 1906 by architects Wilder & Wight. The Library renovated the building and opened its new Central location there in 2004.

Within the Central Library, the Missouri Valley Room contains a wide collection of items related to Kansas City local history, including original and published materials, news articles, postcards, photographs, maps, and directories dating from the city's earliest history. The Library's Ramos Collection includes books, pamphlets, journal articles, and other materials relating to African-American history and culture.

The Durwood Film Vault on the library's lower level, is a former bank vault that was converted into an 18-seat screening room.
