= James Brothers' House and Farm =

Historic house in Missouri, United States

- U.S. National Register of Historic Places
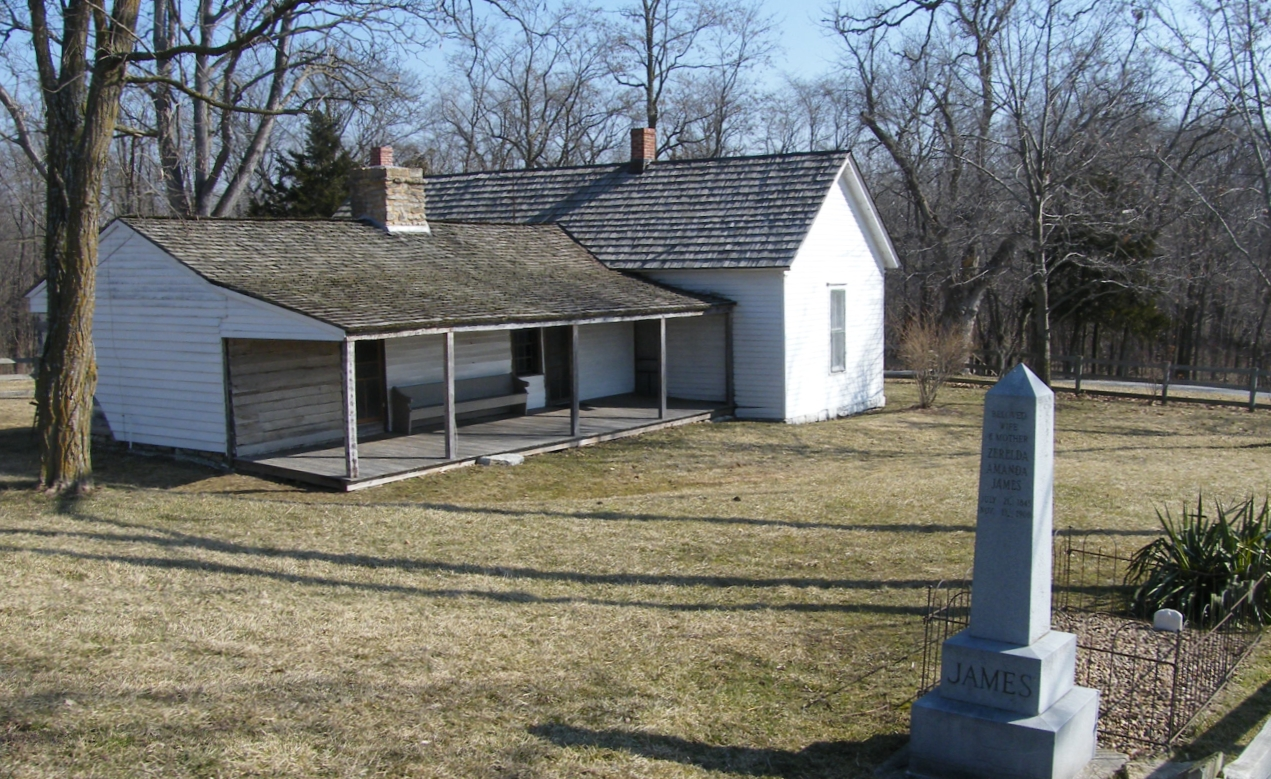
- James Brothers' House and Farm, March 2010

- Location within Missouri Location within the United States
- Location: 2.25 miles (3.62 km) east of Kearney; also northeast of Kearney, near Kearney, Missouri
- Coordinates: 39°23′36″N 94°19′18″W
- Area: 49.9 acres (20.2 ha)
- Built: 1822
- NRHP reference No.: 72000709, 78003417 (Boundary Increase)
- Added to NRHP: March 16, 1972, September 27, 1978 (Boundary Increase)

James Brothers' House and Farm, also known as the Birthplace of Jesse James, is a historic home and farm complex located near Kearney, Clay County, Missouri. The original log section of the farmhouse was built about 1822; it was later enlarged with a wood-frame addition to form a "T"-plan dwelling. The James Brothers' House is significant as the birthplace of Jesse James and Frank James and has been selected as the most important site related to the James Brothers in Missouri. In 1974 Clay County, Missouri, bought it. The county operates the site as a house museum and historic site.

It was listed on the National Register of Historic Places in 1972, with a boundary increase in 1978.
