= New York Life Building (Kansas City, Missouri) =

Commercial tower in Missouri, US

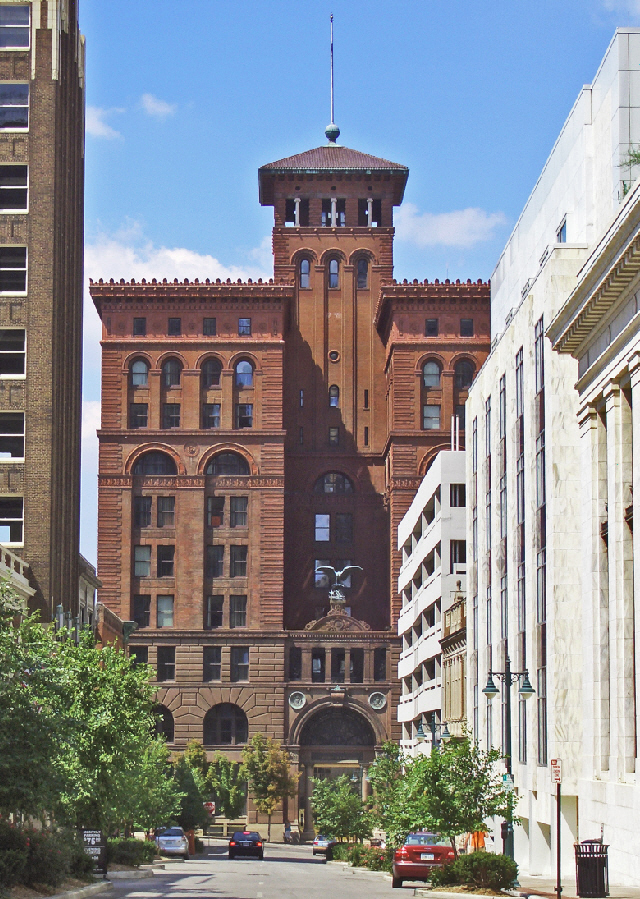
- Interactive map of the New York Life Building area

General information
- Type: Commercial offices
- Architectural style: Neo-Renaissance
- Location: 20 West Ninth Street; Kansas City, Missouri, U.S.
- Coordinates: 39.1040°N 94.5842°W
- Construction started: 1887
- Completed: 1889
- Owner: Roman Catholic Diocese of Kansas City-Saint Joseph

Height
- Roof: 180 ft (55 m)

Technical details
- Floor count: 12
- Floor area: 175,186 sq ft (16,275.3 m^{2})
- Lifts/elevators: 5

Design and construction
- Architect: McKim, Mead, and White

Renovating team
- Architect: Gastinger Walker Harden Architects
- New York Life Building
- U.S. National Register of Historic Places
- U.S. Historic district – Contributing property
- Area: less than one acre
- Part of: West Ninth Street–Baltimore Avenue Historic District (ID76001113)
- NRHP reference No.: 70000336

Significant dates
- Added to NRHP: July 8, 1970
- Designated CP: November 7, 1976

The New York Life Building (also the 20 West Ninth Building) is a commercial structure at 20 West Ninth Street in the Library District of downtown Kansas City in Missouri, United States. Designed in Italian Renaissance style by Frederick Elmer Hill of McKim, Mead & White, it occupies the northeast corner of Ninth Street and Baltimore Avenue. The New York Life Building was Kansas City's tallest building and the city's first building with elevators when it was completed in August 1889. The structure was built for New York Life Insurance Company and is similar in design to the Omaha National Bank Building in Omaha, which the same architects designed for New York Life. It is listed on the National Register of Historic Places.

New York Life officials bought the site in 1886, and work began in early 1887. When the building opened, it hosted numerous banks and law firms. In 1895, New York Life completed an annex, which burned down in 1913. Three New York businessmen bought the building in 1924, but New York Life took back ownership in 1931 and renovated the structure. The Granthurst Realty Company bought the building in 1944, and Transcontinental & Western Air and Waddell & Reed occupied large amounts of space in the mid-20th century. Stanley J. Bushman bought the New York Life Building in 1981, with plans to renovate it. The building was abandoned for much of the 1990s following a failed attempt to convert it into apartments. Local utility firm UtiliCorp (later Aquila) moved its downtown headquarters into the building in 1996 after renovating the structure. Aquila moved out of the building in 2007, and the Roman Catholic Diocese of Kansas City-Saint Joseph purchased it in 2010, using the structure as administrative offices.

The building has an "H"-shaped plan, with two pairs of 10-story wings connected by a central 12-story tower. The wings originally flanked light courts to the north and south, though the northern light court was replaced with additional office space during the 1990s renovation. The Ninth Street and Baltimore Avenue facades are clad in brick and brownstone and are elaborately decorated, with multiple tiers of arched windows. The main entrance on Ninth Street is topped by a bronze sculpture of an eagle sculpted by Louis Saint-Gaudens. Its superstructure consists of cast iron columns and exterior load-bearing walls. The interior spans 200,000 square feet (19,000 m^{2}), with wood decorations, a marble lobby with a barrel vaulted ceiling, mosaic-tiled corridors, and 400 rooms on the upper stories. Over the years, the building has been praised for its architecture.

== Site ==
The New York Life Building is located at 20 West Ninth Street in the Library District of downtown Kansas City, Missouri, United States. It sits at the northeast corner with Baltimore Avenue. Due to the layout of the street grid, Baltimore Avenue is interrupted at Ninth Avenue. The section of Baltimore Avenue south of Ninth Street ends right in front of the building, while the section north of Ninth Street begins immediately west of the building. The main entrance on the building's south facade is aligned with the eastern sidewalk of Baltimore Avenue's southern section.

Located in the Library District and West Ninth Street Historic District, the building is surrounded by other structures such as the Kansas City Club and the Central Library. To the north is a parking garage clad in aluminum siding, which is decorated to blend in with the New York Life Building's brick facade. When the building was constructed in the 1880s, the surrounding area was filled with high cliffs; the surrounding land was not leveled out until later. In addition, the section of Baltimore Avenue south of the building was not developed until just before the building was completed. Prior to the construction of the building, the site had been sold at a foreclosure auction in 1873 for $6,000.

== History ==
In the 1880s, William Rutherford Mead and Joseph M. Wells of the firm McKim, Mead & White became acquainted with officials of the New York Life Insurance Company. At that time, Downtown Kansas City was experiencing increases in development. The development of Kansas City's New York Life Building in the late 1880s coincided with the development of other New York Life regional offices, including a building in Omaha, Nebraska; another in Saint Paul, Minnesota; and a third office in Montreal, Quebec.

=== Development ===
==== Design and site acquisition ====
W. T. Booth bought nearly the entire city block between Wall (now Baltimore), Ninth, Delaware (now Main), and Eighth streets in December 1886, paying $373,000. This site was near the city's business hub, known as the Junction. The company simultaneously acquired sites for the Omaha, Saint Paul, and Montreal offices, the combined cost of which was less than what Booth had paid for the Kansas City site. New York Life was unable to acquire a 61.3-by-120-foot (18.7 by 36.6 m) plot at the corner of Ninth and Delaware streets, owned by one Harriett March. The company's inability to acquire March's site nearly prompted New York Life officials to abandon it in favor of a 48-by-110-foot (15 by 34 m) plot at Walnut and Ninth streets, which was located on higher ground. Officials eventually agreed to the original site after conversing with workers at New York Life's head office, who refused to let them buy the Walnut Street site. To compensate for the failure to buy March's lot, New York Life added two stories to their new structure; there were concerns that the company would not be able to find tenants for the upper floors, as high-rises were still rare at the time.

New York Life invited four firms, including McKim, Mead & White, to compete in an architectural design competition to design two Midwestern regional offices. (Note: The other firms were Babb, Cook & Willard; George B. Post; and Van Brunt & Howe.) Besides the Kansas City office, New York Life was seeking plans for the Omaha office. McKim, Mead & White won the competition in March 1887 and were hired to design the Kansas City and Omaha offices. To save money, the buildings were to be built using the same general plans. Both New York Life buildings would be the tallest structures in their respective cities, and vacant space in both structures would be rented out to other tenants.

The building was designed by Frederick Elmer Hill of McKim, Mead & White. As originally designed, there would be a main entrance on Ninth Street to the south and a secondary entrance on Wall Street to the west. The upper stories would have been "H"-shaped, with light courts facing north and south; there would be glass-roofed atria at the first story within the light courts, as well as elevators in the center of the "H". The plans called for the center of the "H" to be topped by a cupola and a dome. At the time, the structure was planned to cost $800,000 or $1 million.

==== Construction ====
Shortly after receiving the commission, Mead traveled to Kansas City to examine the site, which was cleared in mid-March 1887. New York Life received an excavation permit on March 21, and David Pullman was hired to excavate the foundation. The site was difficult to excavate and repeatedly flooded, as there had been a spring directly underneath, which drained into a nearby swamp. Water from the spring was eventually used to feed the building's hydraulic elevators and its toilets. The foundation had been excavated to a depth of 45 feet (14 m) by May 1887. The next month, Norcross Brothers was hired as the general contractor. Due to the lack of heavy machinery or even paved roads, a team of four mules was employed to haul stone for the foundation from a nearby quarry, and a brick factory was built near the site. In October 1887, the city government approved a construction permit for the building. At the time, the foundation had not been completed, and work had not progressed above the ground story.

After the foundation was completed, White made a trip to Kansas City to examine it. One worker recalled in a memoir that it took four weeks just to build one story. When the building's stonecutters went on strike in early 1888, the Norcross Brothers agreed to increase their salaries. By April 1888, the stonework had been completed to the third story, and workers were about to lay the bricks for the upper stories. The next month, a contractor was selected to construct a sewer leading to the building; though there was an existing sewer on Delaware Street, water from the New York Life Building was physically unable to drain into it. During construction, in June 1888, several men died when a scaffold collapsed; this was the only major incident on the construction site. Following the incident, a grand jury charged Norcross Brothers with negligence, and multiple workers alleged that there had been several safety hazards at the construction site.

The process of fitting out the interiors was laborious; for example, it took each worker one day to lay a 6-by-2-foot (1.83 by 0.61 m) stretch of mosaic-tile floor. The interior decoration was also costly, with the marble-work alone ranging from $60,000 to $70,000. The building's plumbing system had to be partly rebuilt after city inspectors visited the building in early 1889, finding evidence of poor workmanship. By May, Norcross Brothers had completed an iron grille for the building's entrance. New York Life had announced plans earlier that year to create a law library with 20,000 books, and it began moving these books onto the building's 10th floor in June. The building opened in August, and a group of New York Life officials traveled from New York City that November to inspect their new building. Upon the New York Life Building's completion, it was the tallest building in Kansas City and, as such, was sometimes used as a fire lookout tower. The structure cost $1.7 million and may have been the first building in Kansas City to be built by union laborers.

=== Early years ===
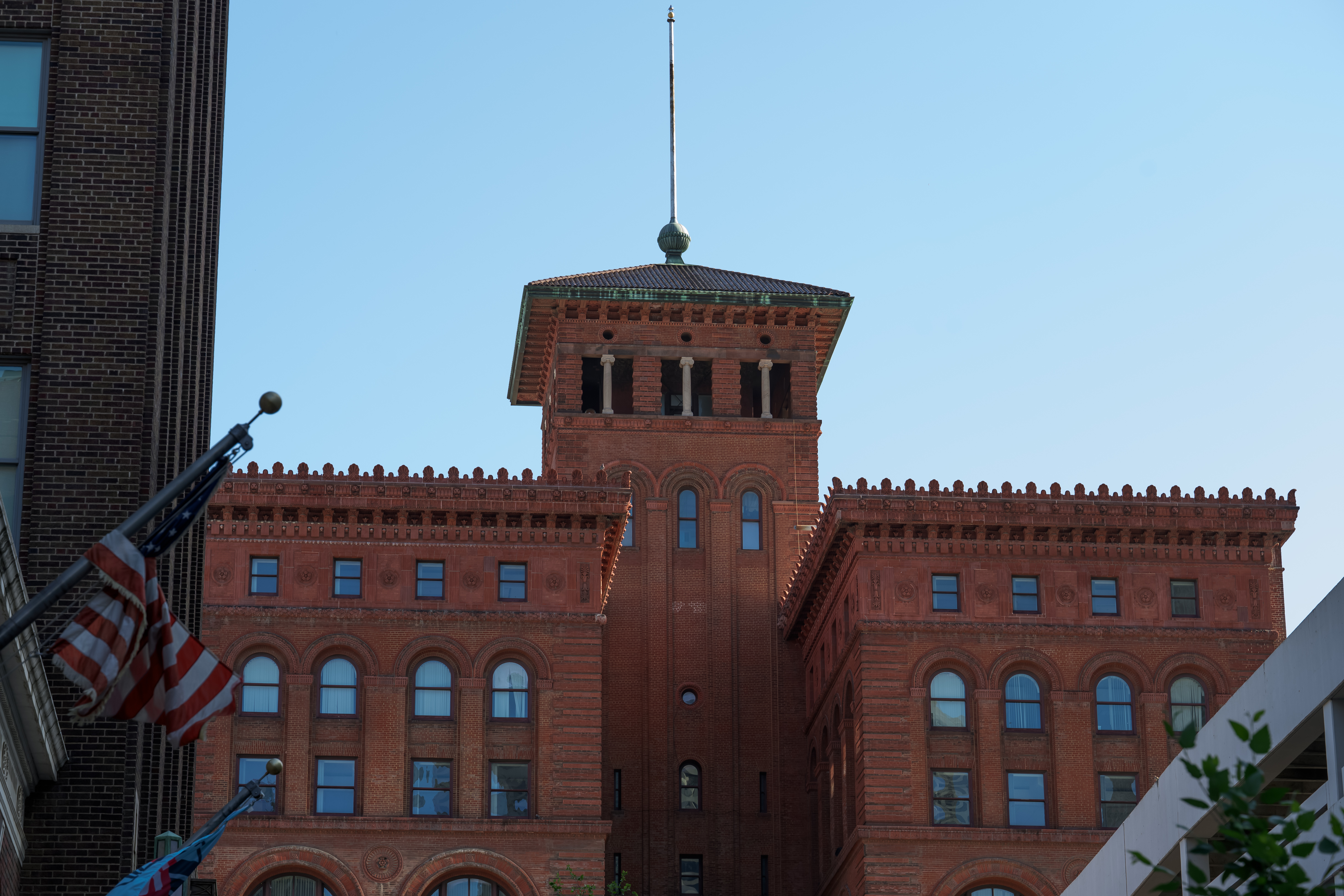
Central tower

The building's completion prompted multiple companies to relocate there from farther north. Originally, New York Life occupied part of the first floor. Other notable tenants included the Kansas City School of Law, the National Bank of Commerce in New York, the Merchants' National Bank of New York, and the United States Trust Company. The banking spaces in the ground level's southwest and southeast corners were used by at least eight banks in the building's first four decades. The building also housed many law firms because of the 10th-floor law library and the site's proximity to Kansas City's financial district. Shortly after the building opened, a fire occurred in one of the offices and was extinguished without spreading to other rooms. Numerous tenants, convinced that the building was fireproof, moved there as a result.

A sculpture of an eagle, depicting the company insignia, was commissioned for the main entrance but was delayed by several years. The sculpture was ultimately hoisted on February 25, 1891, and became a frequent nesting place for pigeons. By the next year, the site was worth $2,500 per square foot ($27,000/m^{2}), twice the rate that New York Life had paid for it, and the building was 40% occupied. New York Life continued trying to acquire the March property at the intersection of Ninth and Delaware streets, as it wanted to build a similar structure on that site, but the company was unsuccessful in doing so. Instead, the company annexed the neighboring Emmons Building on Delaware Street, converting it into the New York Life Building's eastern wing. This annex was finished by 1895.

=== 1900s to 1930s ===
By the early 1900s, New York Life was collecting $60,000 in annual rent, and one company official stated that only two rooms in the building were vacant. The building's early-20th-century tenants included the Missouri Democratic Party, Kellogg's, and a Cuban consulate, and there was also a Selective Service office in the building during World War I. Around 1905, a new elevator was built in the middle of the lobby. The building's annex on Delaware Street burned to the ground on New Year's Day 1913, and the main building was also damaged in the fire. The building was no longer Kansas City's tallest by the 1910s, as it had been superseded by newer steel structures, and various other structures were developed around the intersection of Baltimore Avenue and Ninth Street. Nonetheless, the building remained an architecturally significant structure for residents of Kansas City. During that decade, the building's law library was sold off.

The basement caught fire in 1922, causing $1,500 or $2,500 in damage. The last of the original tenants, the real-estate brokerage R. L. Winter & Co., moved out the next year. In 1924, the New York Life Building was sold to the New York businessmen Louis Rosenbaum, (Note: Rosenbaum later became known as the owner of New York's Flatiron Building and Kansas City's Coca-Cola Building.) Isaac Mittelman, and Henry Mittelman, who also bought two adjoining buildings at 808–820 Delaware Street and 809 Baltimore Avenue. The new owners paid $973,750, taking out a mortgage from New York Life for part of that amount. That July, Rosenbaum announced that the basement and ground floor would be converted to retail, though the building would remain structurally unchanged. Following the renovation, the Business District League gave the building an award for architectural beauty. A sign on the facade, advertising New York Life, was removed in early 1925 after the league said the signage did not fit the building's design.

The Builders' Association of Kansas City proposed constructing a 30-story skyscraper on the same block in early 1931, to be connected to the existing building via an arcade By that year, the New York Life Building was in foreclosure, and Heath Moore & Company was collecting tenants' rent. New York Life took back ownership of the building that June, as the previous owners had owed $620,000 or $660,000. The firm subsequently announced plans to renovate the building, which included cleaning the facade, replacing mechanical systems, and redecorating the interiors. The sidewalk was also to be restored, and Otis Elevator, which had supplied the original hydraulic elevators, was hired to add new electric elevators. These renovations were to cost $150,000 or $200,000. The cornice also had to be replaced after workers found that some of the beams supporting it were deteriorated. The modifications were completed by late 1933. New York Life expanded its own offices in the building in 1937. The building was home to a regional headquarters of the Office of Price Administration during World War II, and it had a United States Navy office during that time as well.

=== 1940s to mid-1980s ===
The Granthurst Realty Company bought the New York Life Building for $240,000 in November 1944, and Granthurst formally took title to the building in February 1945. At the time of the sale, the structure was 92% occupied, but no other real-estate firm wanted to buy the building. By the end of 1945, nearly half the building's space was occupied by Transcontinental & Western Air (later Trans World Airlines, or TWA). Granthurst renamed it the 20 West Ninth Building after World War II. TWA remained a main tenant through the early 1950s, while various grain and milling firms occupied the tenth story. The Granthurst Realty Company, later the Charles F. Curry Company, occupied the entire third floor. A Chicago businessman offered to buy the building in 1953, but the Curry family refused. Instead, in 1956, the Currys partnered with Donald Elbel to form the 20 West Ninth Street Corporation, which took over the building. The same year, TWA moved out of the building, and the financial firm Waddell & Reed leased space there.

The building was 92% occupied by 1957. Waddell & Reed announced in early 1959 that it would expand its presence there, occupying about half the building. This involved renovating the first, second, and fifth floors; at the time, the firm also had space in the basement and on the eighth and ninth floors. Waddell & Reed announced plans to construct a 20-story skyscraper and an adjacent parking garage on the rest of the block in 1962, retaining some offices in the New York Life Building. Kansas City's City Council approved the plans the next year, though a lawsuit delayed the plan for several months. The firm acquired four buildings on the rest of the block, which Waddell & Reed began demolishing in 1964. Work on a 330-space parking garage at the northern end of the site commenced in 1966, and the garage opened the next year. However, the skyscraper itself was canceled.

Waddell & Reed moved out in 1971, relocating to One Crown Center, and Curry subsequently renovated 60,000 square feet (5,600 m^{2}) formerly occupied by Waddell & Reed. These offices were leased to organizations such as the Mid-America Regional Council and several historic-preservation foundations, in addition to numerous architecture and design firms. Charles E. Curry received a preservation award for the renovation in 1979, and the building received a $50,000 grant for restoration that year as part of the National Historic Preservation Act. By the late 1970s and early 1980s, the building's space was more than 90% leased. That year, Stanley J. Bushman bought the building and announced plans to spend $5 million on renovations. The exterior had already been renovated with funds from historic-preservation matching grants. Bushman planned to refurbish the lobby, and he also wanted to renovate the upper-story offices as tenants' leases lapsed.

=== 1980s and 1990s renovations ===
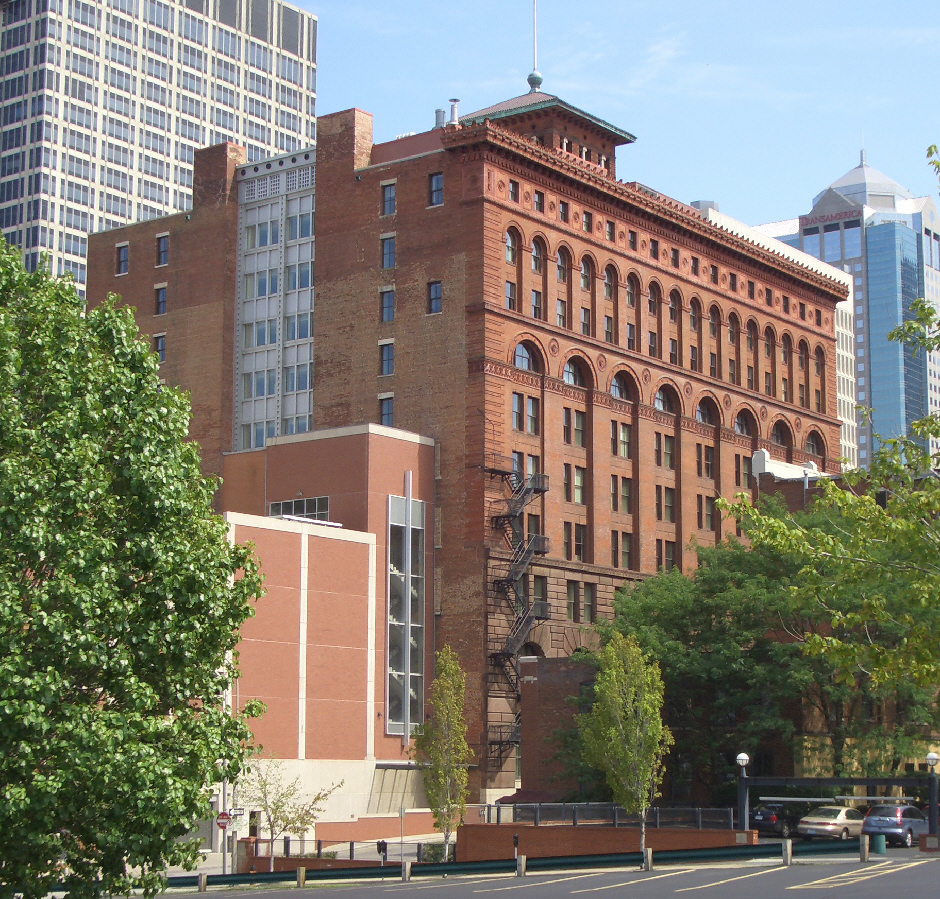
Northwest view

Because of low demand for older office buildings in Kansas City, there were plans to convert the building into an apartment structure by the late 1980s. The New York Life Building's owners, Baltimore at Ninth Ltd., announced in August 1987 that they would convert the building to a housing cooperative with 120 apartments, selling 150,000 shares in the cooperative to residents. West Associates was hired to market the apartments, while the developers borrowed $15 million to fund the conversion. Work stalled in either 1988 or 1989 after interior demolition was mostly completed. Structural issues were cited as one reason for the work stoppage. By 1990, Baltimore at Ninth was planning to construct 71 cooperative apartments and was seeking to borrow $2–3 million to complete the project. Baltimore at Ninth filed for Chapter 11 bankruptcy protection in 1991, at which point there was $24.55 million in unpaid mortgages, $313,000 in unpaid taxes, and nearly $2 million owed to various contractors.

After filing for Chapter 11 bankruptcy protection, Baltimore at Ninth Ltd. proposed converting the building to a 163-room hotel. The owners would have raised $7 million privately and spent $6.6 million in public funds, but the bankruptcy court rejected this plan. The building sat empty for five years, with birds flying through a hole in its roof, and it was unclear who owned the structure. By 1994, local developer Hugh Zimmer wanted to take over the building, saying he was willing to spend $100,000 on feasibility studies for the building. The government of Jackson County, which was planning to auction off the structure to resolve the ownership claims, postponed the auction so Zimmer's plans could be considered. Later that year, Zimmer presented his plans for a $26.2 million renovation to the city's Tax Increment Financing Commission, which supported it. Kansas City's City Council approved the plans that November, and Zimmer took over the building. The council also designated the building as part of a tax-increment financing district, which allowed the renovation to be financed using tax revenue. The district was later expanded to cover an adjacent parking garage that Zimmer wanted to replace.

Local utility form UtiliCorp announced in late 1995 that it would move into the New York Life Building, and it added an exhibition space and a learning center on the first floor. UtiliCorp originally agreed to occupy the second through eighth stories. Gastinger Walker Harden Architects was hired to design the renovation, which included adding modern energy, communications, and environmental features. The project also involved constructing 9,000 square feet (840 m^{2}) at the northern end of the building, reusing or repairing existing decorations, washing and repairing the facade, and cleaning the eagle sculpture above the main entrance. During the renovation, in February 1996, a construction worker died after falling down an elevator shaft. Additionally, the interior finishes were replaced or fixed, and they were modified slightly to meet modern building codes. When the project was completed in 1997, the structure became the headquarters of UtiliCorp. The renovation cost $28–35 million. (Note: Sources disagree on whether it cost $28 million, $30 million, $31 million, or $35 million.)

=== 2000s to present ===
In the first decade of the 21st century, UtiliCorp continued to occupy the New York Life Building, even after rebranding as Aquila Inc. At its peak in 2001, Aquila had 800 employees in the building and an adjacent structure, which formed the company's downtown headquarters. By the mid-2000s, the buildings were half empty. Aquila charged its customers a fee for expenses related to the headquarters, and Kansas and Missouri utility regulators had raised concerns that there were not enough employees in the buildings to justify the price of the fee. Aquila announced plans in 2004 to double each worker's office space in the downtown headquarters, thereby reducing the number of people who could work there; by then, the downtown headquarters had a combined 347 workers. Aquila also agreed to move 180 additional employees to the downtown headquarters in 2006.

When Aquila was acquired by Great Plains Energy in 2007, Great Plains' CEO Michael Chesser indicated that the firm would not move its headquarters into the New York Life Building. Instead, many of the employees at the building were laid-off, and Great Plains announced that it would sell the building. The building's remaining employees were relocated to a nearby structure owned by Great Plains, and the structure remained vacant for three years. Brenda Wood of Professional Cleaning and Innovative Building Services, which used to maintain the building during Aquila's tenancy, expressed interest in acquiring it. Wood sued the Kansas City Power & Light District (KCP&L) in August 2010, on the basis that KCP&L had agreed to sell the building to her before reneging. KCP&L responded that Wood had agreed to buy the building but then, on two occasions, failed to make a payment before the deadline. A judge subsequently dismissed the lawsuit, as the Roman Catholic Diocese of Kansas City-Saint Joseph had agreed to buy the building from KCP&L, but had been unable to finalize its purchase due to the legal dispute.

The building was sold in October 2010 to the diocese, who also acquired the adjacent 565-space garage and the building at 850 Main Street, for $11.7 million. The church planned to occupy about 75% of the New York Life Building, renting out the rest of the space. The portion of the building occupied by the diocese was exempted from property taxes. The structure became known as the Catholic Center, housing administrative offices and employing about 180 workers. Gastinger Walker Harden Architects was rehired to redesign the building for the diocese; the modifications included adding religious decorations and converting some spaces for religious use. The diocese moved into the building in early 2011. Some of the space remained empty two years later, so the diocese considered leasing part of the building to a religious college. Catholic Charities of Kansas City-St. Joseph moved out of the building in 2014 after acquiring another structure nearby. The diocese began distributing breakfast to homeless people at the building in 2023.

== Architecture ==
The New York Life Building, designed by McKim, Mead & White, is sometimes described as one of Kansas City's first skyscrapers and the city's first steel-framed building. The building was the tallest in Kansas City at the time of completion, contrasting with the city's previous tallest buildings, which had been three or four stories high. Frederick Elmer Hill of McKim, Mead & White was the most heavily involved with the design; he also designed other buildings in Kansas City such as Grace and Holy Trinity Cathedral and Convention Hall. Though the building has been attributed to Stanford White of the same firm, White is not known to have visited Kansas City. The New York Life Building is decorated in the Renaissance Revival style, which at the time was shared by only one other building in the city, the New England Building. By the early 21st century, it was also one of Downtown Kansas City's few remaining 19th-century buildings.

The New York Life buildings in Kansas City and Omaha were built using the same general plans. The Kansas City structure retains most of its original decorations, in contrast to its sister building in Omaha, where many of the decorations have been removed. The structure measures about 120 by 160 feet (37 by 49 m) across and originally had an H-shaped footprint, with four 10-story wings (two each facing north and south, on the western and eastern sides of the building). These wings originally flanked light courts to the north and south, which were intended to increase natural-light illumination. The wings on the western and eastern sides are connected by a tower measuring 12 or 13 stories, running west–east. The central tower measures 210 feet (64 m) tall, with a hip roof. The two north-facing wings were also connected to each other as part of a 1990s renovation, replacing the northern light court.

=== Facade ===
The New York Life Building has a brick and brownstone exterior. Norcross Brothers manufactured the brick for the building at a plant at 3rd Street and Broadway Boulevard, while foundation stone came from a quarry at 31st Street and Southwest Boulevard, near the Kansas–Missouri border. Individual pieces of brownstone were shipped from Vermont, and cherry-lumber window frames were made in Boston. Arcades are used to visually unite the different elevations of the facade, and numerous string courses run horizontally across the western and southern elevations.

The southern elevation facing Ninth Street, and the western elevation facing Baltimore Avenue, are elaborately decorated and are divided horizontally into multiple tiers. The southern elevation is also divided vertically into five bays (two for either south-facing wing, and one in the center), while the western elevation is divided into eight bays. The eastern elevation, facing Main Street, is made of brick and contains few decorations, as McKim, Mead & White had believed that other structures would be constructed to the east. The northern elevation also has little ornamentation and is made of brick. The facade of the annex is recessed 5 feet (1.5 m) from the original facade and is made of aluminum, which is minimally decorated. Before the northern elevation was filled in, the light court was also minimally decorated.

==== Lower stories ====
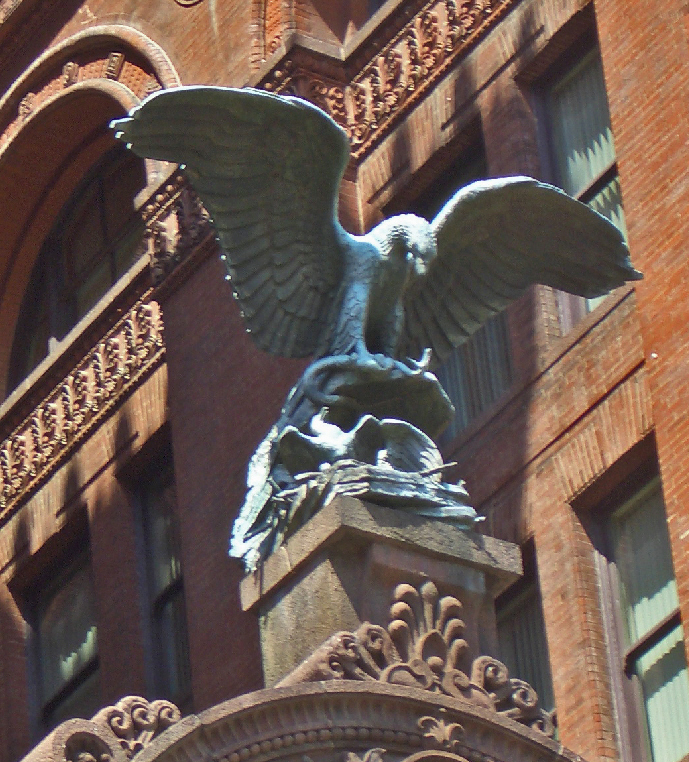
Massive bronze sculpture by Louis St. Gaudens of an eagle tending a nest of baby eaglets above the street entrance

The basement is clad in granite. The first through third stories are clad in rusticated brownstone, and the southern elevation contains the main entrance. The entrance is located within a wide arch, flanked by granite pedestals and Doric-style marble columns that support a horizontal transom bar. There is a semicircular iron grille, measuring 11 feet (3.4 m) tall and 20 feet (6.1 m) wide, above the main entryway. On either side of the entrance are two arched windows on the second story. On the southern elevation, the third story is also divided into five bays, with an open colonnade in the central bay and a pair of windows in each of the other bays. There are string courses above the first and second stories. A brownstone string course runs above the third story on both the southern and western elevations.

A bronze sculpture of an eagle is perched on the third-story colonnade, above the main entrance. The eagle weighs 4,000 pounds (1,800 kg) and is variously cited as measuring 12 feet (3.7 m) or 15 feet (4.6 m) across. It was sculpted by Louis Saint-Gaudens, (Note: The eagle sculpture is sometimes attributed to his brother Augustus Saint-Gaudens or to their apprentice Bela Pratt. A Kansas City Star article from 1997 says that the sculpture was originally attributed to Augustus, but that Louis was more likely to be the sculptor. Augustus's son Homer Saint-Gaudens did not mention the eagles in either of two books detailing his father's works.) who reportedly did not visit Kansas City during the project and instead had two assistants help him. Saint-Gaudens sculpted identical pieces for New York Life's offices in Omaha and Minneapolis, which were cast from the same molds. When the eagle was erected, Mead wrote that "it is a work of art and Kansas City should be proud of it".

==== Upper stories ====
The upper stories are organized in a similar style to the Marshall Field and Company Building in Chicago, aside from the cornice above the tenth story. They have an orange-brick facade, except the quoins at each corner, which are made of architectural terracotta. On the fourth through seventh stories of the western elevation, southern elevation, and southern light court, each bay contains a four-story-high arched opening. Each arched opening has two stories in each bay, as well as terracotta bands above the sixth floor and a terracotta string course wrapping above the seventh floor.

On the eighth and ninth floors, each bay on the western and southern elevations, as well as the side walls of the southern light court, contains two double-height arches, with a rectangular window on the eighth story and an arched window on the ninth story. The southern elevation of the central tower has three tiny windows on either story, rather than double-height arches. The tenth and highest story of each wing has rectangular windows alternating with terracotta medallions; these are topped by an elaborate terracotta cornice. On all four elevations of the central tower, there are three arched windows at the eleventh story and three pairs of rectangular windows (separated by Ionic columns) on the twelfth story.

=== Structural and mechanical features ===
Like many contemporary buildings, the New York Life Building has a superstructure made of cast iron columns, and the exterior walls double as load-bearing walls. Each of the walls measures 3 feet (0.91 m) thick. There are also steel I-beams; they were the first such beams to be used in a building in Kansas City. The beams are spaced at 4-foot (1.2 m) intervals, with terracotta blocks between each set of beams. The northern annex, between the northwest and northeast wings, includes K-shaped and X-shaped bracing for seismic stability.

Originally, there was an interior stairwell in the southeastern wing and a fire escape in the northeastern wing. There is another interior stairwell in the western end of the building, added in the 1990s. The building also had Kansas City's first elevators, with four elevators accessed from the central lobby. These elevators were originally supplemented by a freight elevator. Another service elevator was added in the western half of the building during the 1990s renovation.

Below grade are two basement levels, which extend to the underlying layer of bedrock. When the New York Life Building was first constructed, the basement had a generator for the elevators, since the local electrical power plant did not provide continuous service. Due to the inconsistent electrical service, the building also had to rely on natural light from windows, along with gas lamps and fireplaces, the latter of which were made of marble and bronze. Following the 1990s renovation, the building had electric chillers and gas boilers. The upper floors are equipped with sensors that automatically dim the lights when the rooms are unoccupied.

=== Interior ===
The structure has a floor area of 200,000 square feet (19,000 m^{2}). The interiors contain cherry wood decorations, which were carved in Boston. The vestibule has pink Tennessee marble walls and red Vermont marble floors, as well as a plaster ceiling vault that is tinted to appear like bronze. A set of seven steps ascends from the vestibule to the central tower's lobby, which is accessed by a set of glass doors. The lobby itself has a mosaic-tile floor, pink-marble walls, and granite pillars; these are all illuminated by sconces on the walls. The lobby also has a barrel vaulted ceiling, which is made of translucent glass and iron. At either end of the lobby are granite columns, while the lobby's side walls lead to offices with cherry wood paneling and frosted glass windows. Next to the lobby is an elevator vestibule clad in white marble, along with a stairway. North of the lobby, within the northern annex, is an atrium. There was also a two-story vault in the western basement.

On the upper stories, there were originally 400 rooms. The corridors had mosaic-tile floors, like those in the Vanderbilt houses in New York. By the 1980s, some of the interiors retained their original bronze fireplace mantels and cherry wood panels, while other rooms had been renovated in a more modern style. Following the late-1990s renovation, the upper stories' ceilings have curved soffits near the windows, a design feature that was intended to disperse sunlight. The upper floors have lower ceilings, making this effect more pronounced. In addition, parts of the ceiling are pulled back to accommodate the Corinthian-style capitals atop the interior columns. As of 2011, the Roman Catholic Diocese of Kansas City–Saint Joseph occupied the first through fifth floors, with a reception area and offices on the second floor, an ecclesiastical court, on the fifth floor, and a 75-seat chapel. The building retained its original lobby and 22 original fireplace mantels.

== Impact ==
Shortly after the building was complete, William Willard Howard of Harper's Magazine printed a picture of the building and other brand-new structures in downtown Kansas City, calling them "for the most part admirable". A Kansas City Star article from 1913 said that, when the building was finished, it received mainly positive acclaim. The Star wrote that the building had "encountered only one severe critic", who claimed that the structure was inadequate for the needs of contemporary office tenants. When the building was first sold in 1924, the Kansas City Post wrote that the building was "one of the best designed office structures in Kansas City", while the Kansas City Times called it "an early example of good architecture in business construction". The Star said in 1929 that the structure's masonry facade "bespeaks solidity achieved successfully before the days of steel and concrete construction".

In the 1960s, the Kansas City Star referred to the structure as one of the city's "monuments to the fragrant summers of the past". Donald Hoffmann, the architectural critic for the same paper, conversely wrote that the overall design was weak, saying the southern and western facades seem "merely slapped onto the building" and that the lobby is "not a place to be walked through, and becomes all but meaningless". After the building was nearly demolished in the 1990s, it was detailed in a short film. The building's 1990s renovation was credited with reviving interest in historic buildings in Kansas City, and the project received the National Trust for Historic Preservation's National Honor Award for preservation. A writer for The Kansas City Star wrote that the building's austere-looking facade "turns out to be quite richly ornamented—and the more so the higher you look", calling it the city's "single finest building".

The New York Life Building was added to the National Register of Historic Places in July 1970, and the Landmarks Commission of Greater Kansas City ordered a plaque to memorialize the designation in 1973. The building is also a contributing property to the West 9th Street-Baltimore Avenue Historic District. In addition, the Landmarks Commission nominated the building for municipal-landmark status in 1986, and the City Plan Commission endorsed the nomination.

== See also ==
- Tallest buildings in Kansas City
- National Register of Historic Places listings in Downtown Kansas City, Missouri
