= Kansas City Public Library =

Public library in Missouri, US

- 39.1027°N 94.5839°W
- Location: Kansas City, Missouri
- Established: 1873; 153 years ago
- Branches: 10

Collection
- Size: 1,215,875

Access and use
- Circulation: 1,990,444
- Population served: 218,765

Other information
- Director: Abby Yellman
- Website: kclibrary.org

The Kansas City Public Library is a public system headquartered in the Central Library in Kansas City, Missouri.

The system operates its Central Library and neighborhood branches located in Kansas City, Independence, and Sugar Creek. Founded on December 5, 1873, it is the oldest and third largest public library system in the Kansas City metropolitan area.

Its special collections, housed in the Central Library's Missouri Valley Room, has a collection of Kansas City local history, including original and published materials, news articles, post cards, photographs, maps, and city directories dating from the community's earliest history. The Library's Ramos Collection includes books, pamphlets, journal articles, and other materials relating to African-American history and culture.

== Overview ==
=== Branches ===
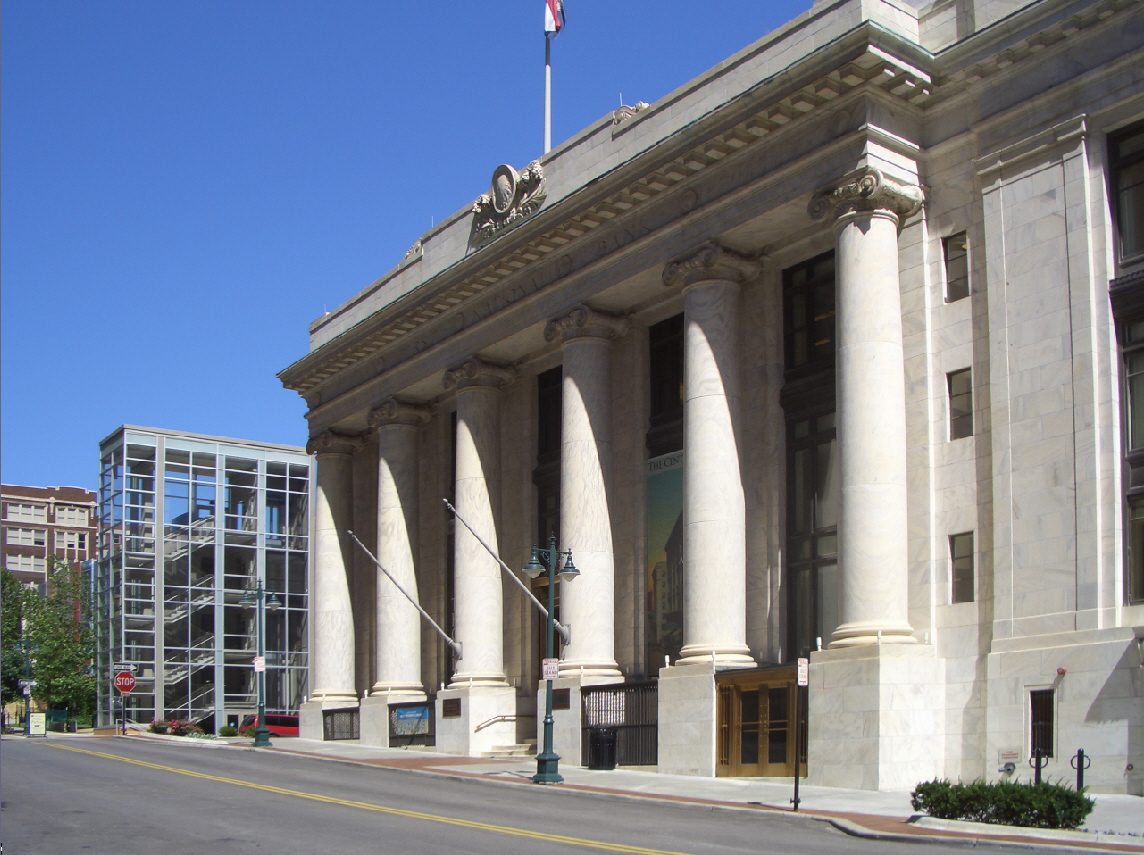
Central Library

- Central - 14 West 10th Street
- L.H. Bluford - 3050 Prospect Avenue
- North-East - 6000 Wilson Road
- Plaza - 4801 Main Street
- I.H. Ruiz - 2017 West Pennway Street
- Southeast - 6242 Swope Parkway
- Sugar Creek - 102 South Sterling Avenue - (Sugar Creek)
- Trails West - 11401 East 23rd Street - (Independence)
- Waldo - 201 East 75th Street
- Westport - 118 Westport Road

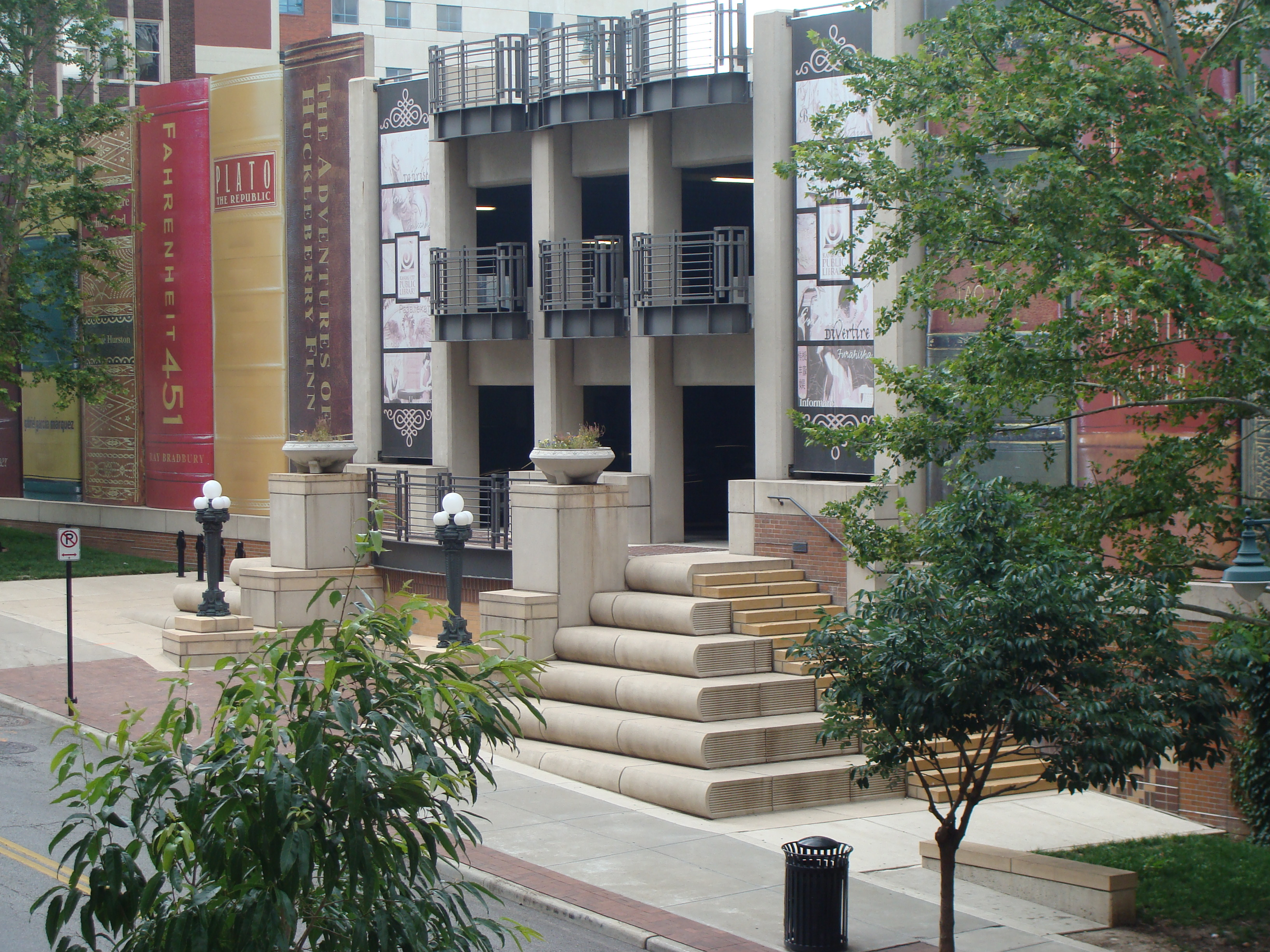
Community Bookshelf (Main parking complex)

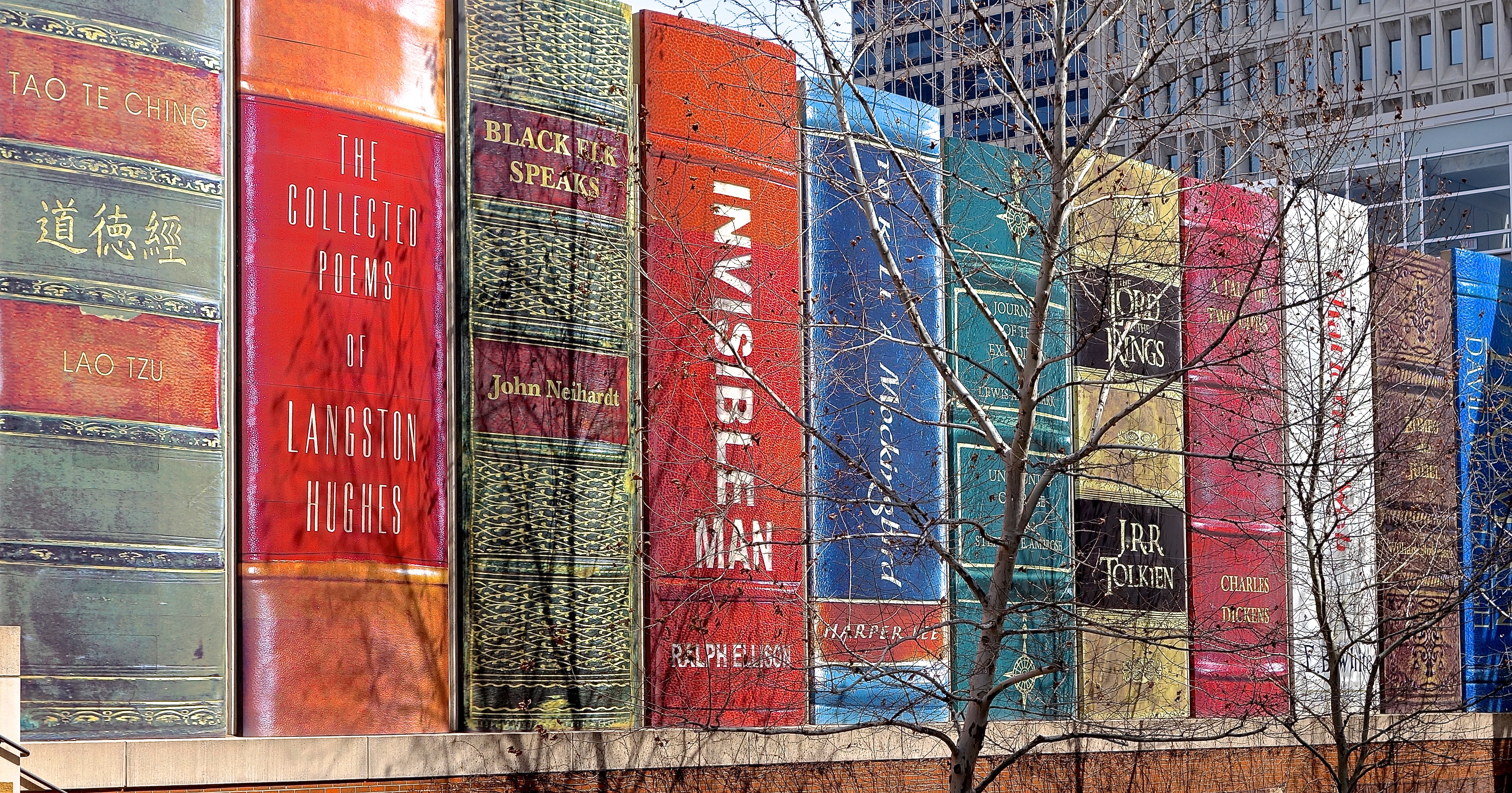
Parking façade

Built in 2004, The Community Bookshelf (also known as the Library District Parking Garage) is a striking feature of Kansas City's downtown. It runs along the south wall of the Central Library's parking garage on 10th Street between Wyandotte Street and Baltimore Avenue. The concept of turning the parking garage into a bookshelf was part of an effort on behalf of the community to bring character to the needed structure.

"The book spines, which measure approximately 25 feet by 9 feet, are made of signboard mylar that is laid over concrete panels and an aluminum substructure. The shelf showcases 22 titles reflecting a wide variety of reading interests as suggested by Kansas City readers and then selected by The Kansas City Public Library Board of Trustees".

The following books are depicted in the work:

- Kansas City Stories Volumes 1 and 2
- Catch-22 by Joseph Heller
- Silent Spring by Rachel Carson
- O Pioneers! by Willa Cather
- Cien Años de Soledad (One Hundred Years of Solitude) by Gabriel García Márquez
- Their Eyes Were Watching God by Zora Neale Hurston
- Fahrenheit 451 by Ray Bradbury
- The Republic by Plato
- The Adventures of Huckleberry Finn by Mark Twain
- Tao Te Ching by Lau Tsu
- The Collected Poems of Langston Hughes by Langston Hughes
- Black Elk Speaks by Black Elk, as told to John G. Neihardt
- Invisible Man by Ralph Ellison
- To Kill a Mockingbird by Harper Lee
- Journals of the Expedition by Lewis and Clark
- Undaunted Courage: Meriwether Lewis, Thomas Jefferson, And The Opening Of The American West by Stephen Ambrose
- The Lord of the Rings by J.R.R. Tolkien
- A Tale of Two Cities by Charles Dickens
- Charlotte's Web by E.B. White
- Romeo and Juliet by William Shakespeare
- Truman by David G. McCullough
- a volume of children's books with the following:

Goodnight Moon by Margaret Wise Brown; Harold and the Purple Crayon by Crockett Johnson; Winnie the Pooh by A. A. Milne; Green Eggs and Ham by Dr. Seuss; What a Wonderful World by George David Weiss and Bob Thiele; Little House on the Prairie by Laura Ingalls Wilder; The Wonderful Wizard of Oz by L. Frank Baum; M.C. Higgins, the Great by Virginia Hamilton

=== Outreach ===
The Kansas City Public Library has an open door policy for patrons. Beginning in 2016, the Library's AmeriCorps VISTAs and the Outreach team began a program called Coffee & Conversations for patrons in order to tackle the issue of homelessness within the community. During the meeting, the library provides information to patrons on the topic of homelessness and other social issues. They also invite open dialogue during this time. This program was modeled after a similar program from the Dallas Public Library.

Additionally, the Kansas City Public Library has a program to help immigrants. The Refugee and Immigrant Services & Empowerment (RISE) program helps immigrants by providing information on resources, which help them pursue citizenship.

The Library periodically hosts edit-a-thons on topics relevant to the Kansas City Area. Recent edit-a-thons have covered Kansas City Black History, Kansas City Jazz, and Kansas City Philanthropists.

== History ==
In November 1873, a public library was conceived by the Kansas City Board of Education by arranging a course of six popular lectures as a fundraiser to buy books. Superintendent of schools, Dr. James Michlejohn Greenwood, selected these first books. Carrie Westlake Whitney was hired as the first librarian in 1881. A record of the origin of the Kansas City Public Library was solicited by Major L. K. Thacher via a Board resolution, adopted on November 19, 1891, resulting in the pamphlet titled A history of the Kansas City Public Library from 1873 to 1893. Prepared by order of the Board of Education by J. M. Greenwood, December 1, 1892.

...at all times one grand object has been kept steadily in view, that Kansas City was quietly laying the foundation for one of the best libraries in the entire country ... that would reflect great credit on the enterprise, perseverance and intelligence of those farsighted citizens who started this movement during one of the greatest financial depressions ever known in the history of the country.

— James Michlejohn Greenwood

== Awards and accolades ==
The Kansas City Public Library has received numerous awards and acknowledgements, including these:

- Library Journal gave KCPL a five star rating in 2013, 2016, and 2018 as one of 10 libraries earning five stars among 127 libraries with budgets between $10 million and $30 million, focused on circulation, digital circulation, library visits, internet computer usage, and program attendance.
- 2017 Paul Howard Award for Courage from the American Library Association
- In 2014, the American Library Association gave the Excellence in Library Programming award
- In 2008, First Lady Laura Bush bestowed the National Medal for Museum and Library Service to KCPL as one of 10 institutional recipients, especially recognizing its Books to Go program and free public events.
