= Hannibal and St. Joseph Railroad =

Railroad established in 1860

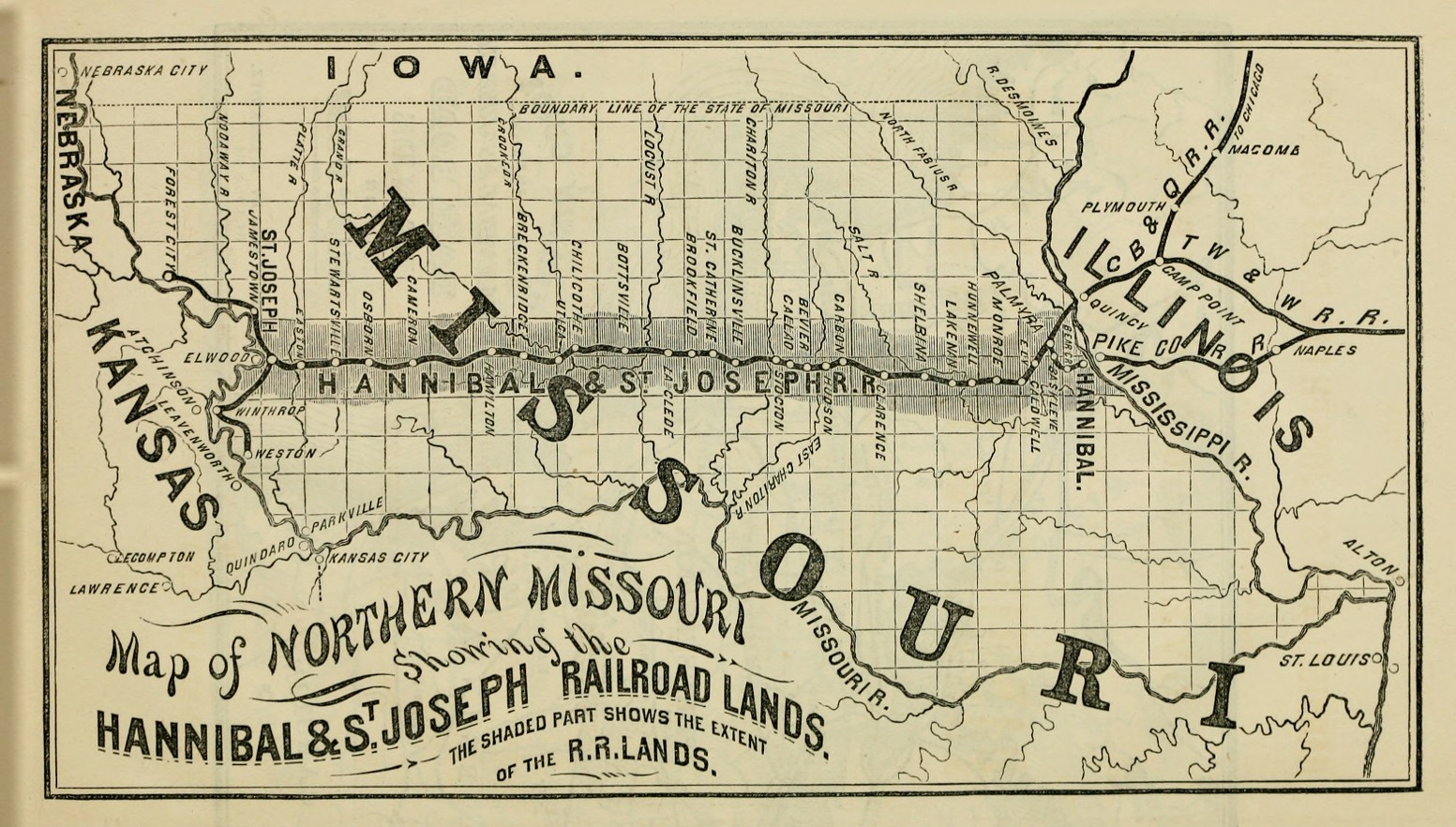
- Hannibal and St. Joseph Railroad, 1860

Overview
- Locale: Missouri
- Dates of operation: 1846–1883
- Successor: Chicago, Burlington and Quincy Railroad

Technical
- Track gauge: 4 ft 8 1/2 in (1,435 mm) standard gauge

The Hannibal and St. Joseph Railroad was the first railroad to cross Missouri starting in Hannibal in the northeast and going to St. Joseph, Missouri, in the northwest. It is said to have carried the first letter to the Pony Express on April 3, 1860, from a train pulled behind the locomotive Missouri.

The line connected the second and third largest cities in the state of Missouri prior to the American Civil War. The stage route that it paralleled had previously been called the "Hound Dog Trail".

== History ==
=== Construction in 1850s ===
Construction on the railroad (formed during an 1846 meeting at the Hannibal office of John Marshall Clemens, father of Mark Twain) began in 1851 from both cities. Bonds from counties along the route along with the donation of 600,000 acres (2,400 km^{2}) in land voted by Congress paid for construction. The lines met in Chillicothe, Missouri, on February 13, 1859. A marker the railroad placed at the site was discovered in 2009 at the Burlington Northern and Santa Fe Railroad Museum in Galesburg, Illinois.

The line started westward from Hannibal and ran through the Missouri cities of Palmyra, Monroe City, Lakenan, Shelbina, Clarence, Anabel, Macon, Bevier, Callao, New Cambria, Bucklin, Brookfield, Laclede, Meadville, Wheeling, Chillicothe, Utica, Mooresville, Breckenridge, Nettleton, Hamilton, Kidder, Cameron, Osborn, Stewartsville, Hemple, Easton, before arriving in St. Joseph.

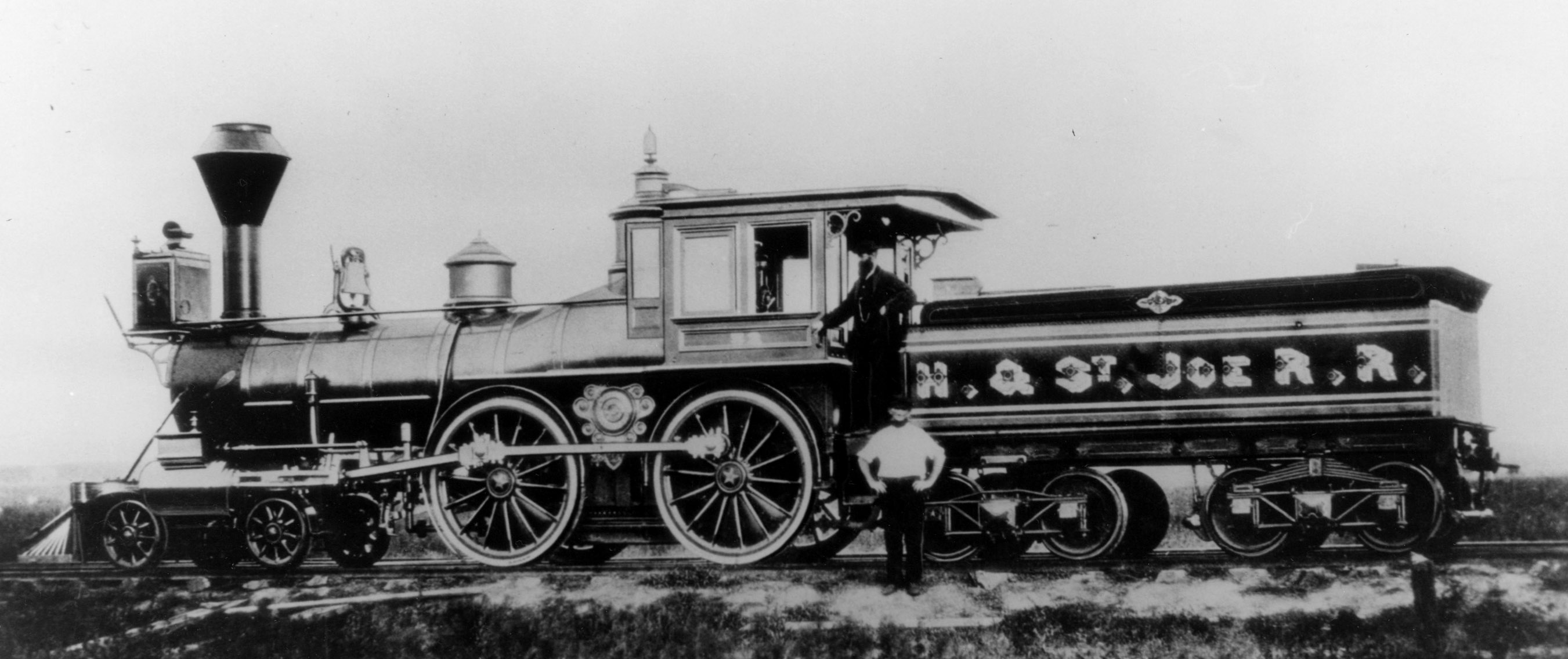
Early locomotive, Hannibal & St. Joseph Railroad

John Rogers, well before he became a popular 19th-century American sculptor, worked in 1856 and 1857 as a mechanic on the railroad. Abraham Lincoln rode the route in 1859 en route to a speech in Council Bluffs, Iowa.

The first assignment of Col. Ulysses S. Grant during the American Civil War was protecting the railroad and Pony Express mail. Grant was promoted to brigadier general in August 1861 after the assignment. Shortly after Grant left his assignment, the railroad experienced its worst disaster of the war on September 3, 1861, when bushwhackers burned a bridge over the Platte River, causing a derailment that killed between 17 and 20 and injured 100 in the Platte Bridge Railroad Tragedy.

=== Post offices on wheels, 1860s ===
The first experiment in distributing mails in so-called "post offices on wheels" was made in 1862 by William A. Davis between Hannibal and St. Joseph, Missouri. It was intended to expedite the connection at St. Joseph with the overland stage, which had replaced the Pony Express routes to the West a year earlier. The H&StJ furnished a baggage car, altered to Davis' specifications. Similar to a postal route agent's car, it had a table and a 65-pigeon-hole letter case, but no pouch rack. Davis boarded the westbound train at Palmyra, Missouri, with authority to open the sacks and letter packages which were addressed to the St. Joseph DPO, to remove all California letters, and to make up and sort the mail in a manner identical to the way the St. Joseph DPO would have dispatched it. Davis was paid at the rate of $100.00 per month. The railroad was harassed by guerrillas and by lack of maintenance, resulting in several suspensions and finally abandonment of the experiment. After the Civil War, Railway Post Office (RPO) service was re-established on this line, and it became known as the Chicago & Kansas City RPO.

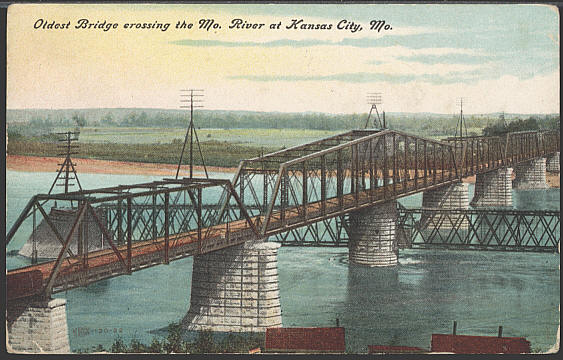
Hannibal Bridge over Missouri River at Kansas City.

In 1867 a consortium of Charles E. Kearney, Robert T. Van Horn, and Kersey Coates persuaded the railroad to build a cutoff at Cameron to Kansas City, Missouri. The railroad, through its subsidiary Kansas City and Cameron Railroad, built a shortcut and the (1,371-foot (418 m) Hannibal Bridge over the Missouri River in downtown Kansas City. The bridge established a direct link between Chicago and Texas. It was the first rail bridge across the Missouri River when it opened July 3, 1869, and established Kansas City rather than Leavenworth or St. Joseph as the dominant city in the region.

=== Acquisition by Chicago, Burlington and Quincy Railroad ===
The Chicago, Burlington and Quincy Railroad used the railroad for through traffic to Chicago almost from the start, and in 1883 acquired it. The rail connection between Hannibal and St. Joseph remained in place for about 125 years. On March 2, 1970, the railroad became the property of Burlington Northern after the Chicago, Burlington and Quincy Railroad merged with 3 other railroads to form the new company.

During the mid-1980s, the railroad discontinued service from Brookfield westward to St. Joseph. Today, four miles (6 km) of track between Brookfield and Laclede remain, and is primarily used for surplus rail car storage on the (now) BNSF Railway. The tracks from Laclede westward to just outside St. Joseph no longer remain, while the tracks from Brookfield eastward toward the Mississippi River remain in use by the BNSF. The tracks from near the Missouri River in St. Joseph to roughly the eastern city limit of St. Joseph are still operated by BNSF. The track (appx 4 miles) from that point east to near the Platte River are owned and operated by Herzog Contracting.
