= Charles E. Kearney =

American businessman (1820–1898)

Charles Esmond Kearney (March 8, 1820 – January 3, 1898) was the first president of the Kansas City and Cameron Railroad which as a subsidiary of the Hannibal & St. Joseph Railroad and built the Hannibal Bridge establishing Kansas City, Missouri, as the dominant city in the region.

He was born in Ireland before emigrating to Texas in 1837. He moved to Kansas City in 1852 where he outfitted travelers on the Oregon Trail and Santa Fe Trail from Westport, Missouri.

During this time he saw the need for direct link from Chicago to Texas. He along with Kersey Coates and Robert T. Van Horn persuaded the railroad to build a cutoff of their line from Cameron, Missouri, to Kansas City for the first bridge across the Missouri River which opened in 1869. He was the first president of the subsidiary. The result was the Hannibal Bridge which was the first bridge across the Missouri River. It established Kansas City rather than Leavenworth, Kansas, or St. Joseph, Missouri, as the dominant city in the region.

The town of Kearney, Missouri, which is on the route, is named for him.
