= Omaha National Bank Building =

- U.S. National Register of Historic Places
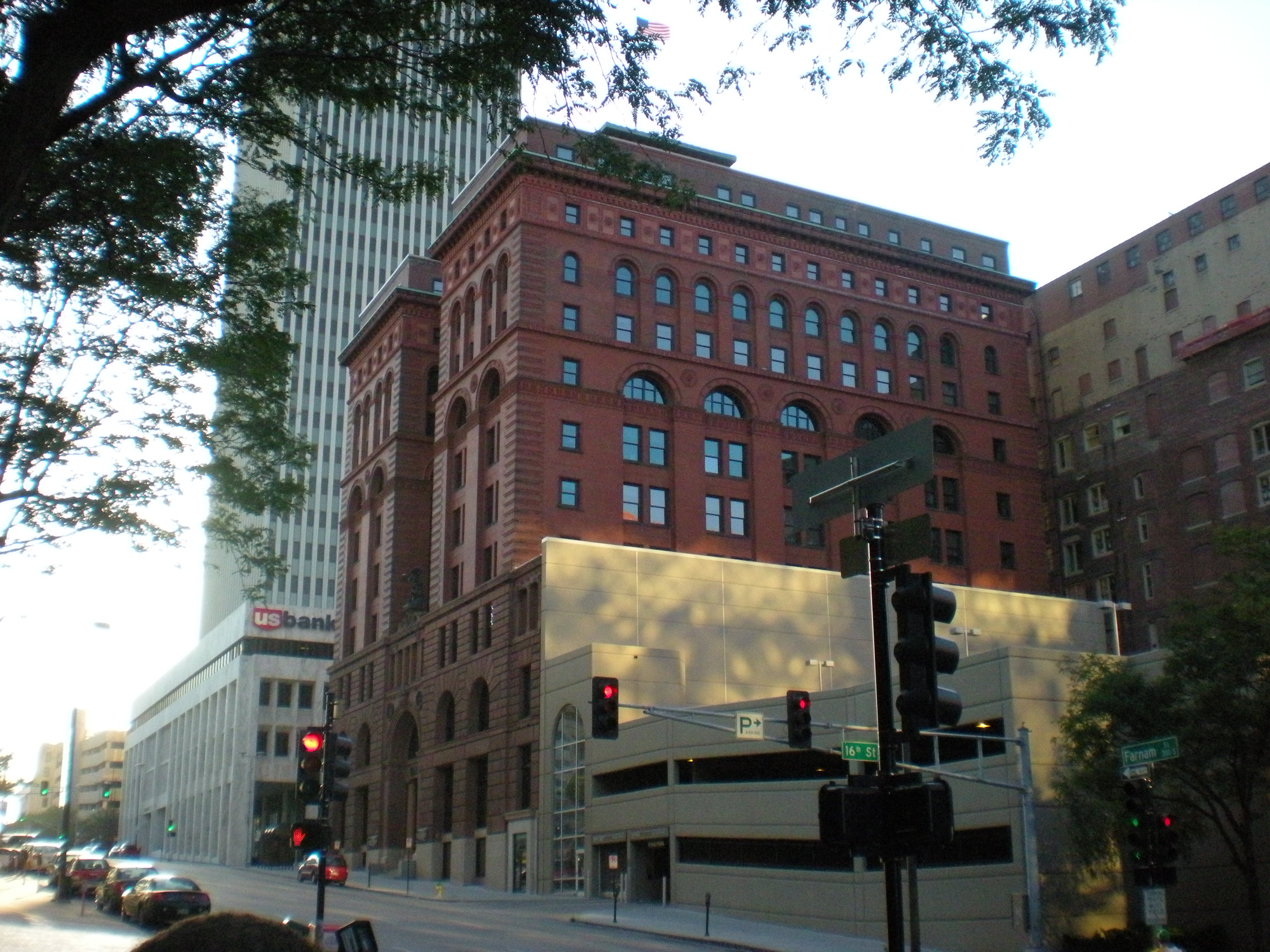

- Location within Nebraska Location within the United States
- Location: Omaha, Nebraska
- Coordinates: 41°15′27.75″N 95°56′16.03″W
- Built: 1888
- Architect: McKim, Mead & White
- Architectural style: Italianate
- NRHP reference No.: 72000748
- Added to NRHP: October 18, 1972

The Omaha National Bank Building was built in 1888–89 at 1650 Farnam Street in Downtown Omaha, Nebraska. Designed by McKim, Mead & White in the Italian Renaissance style, the building was saved from demolition by a rehabilitation in 1978. Listed on the National Register of Historic Places in 1972, the building was originally known as the New York Life Insurance Building; it was renamed in 1906.

== History ==
Originally occupied by the New York Life Insurance Company, the building was purchased by the Kountze Brothers's Omaha National Bank in 1909. Constructed in 1888–89, the building was designed in the Renaissance Revival style by Frederick Elmer Hill (1857–1929) of the New York City architectural firm of McKim, Mead, and White. The firm designed an identical office tower, the New York Life Building in Kansas City, Missouri, and was Omaha's first 10-story structure.

=== Omaha National Bank ===
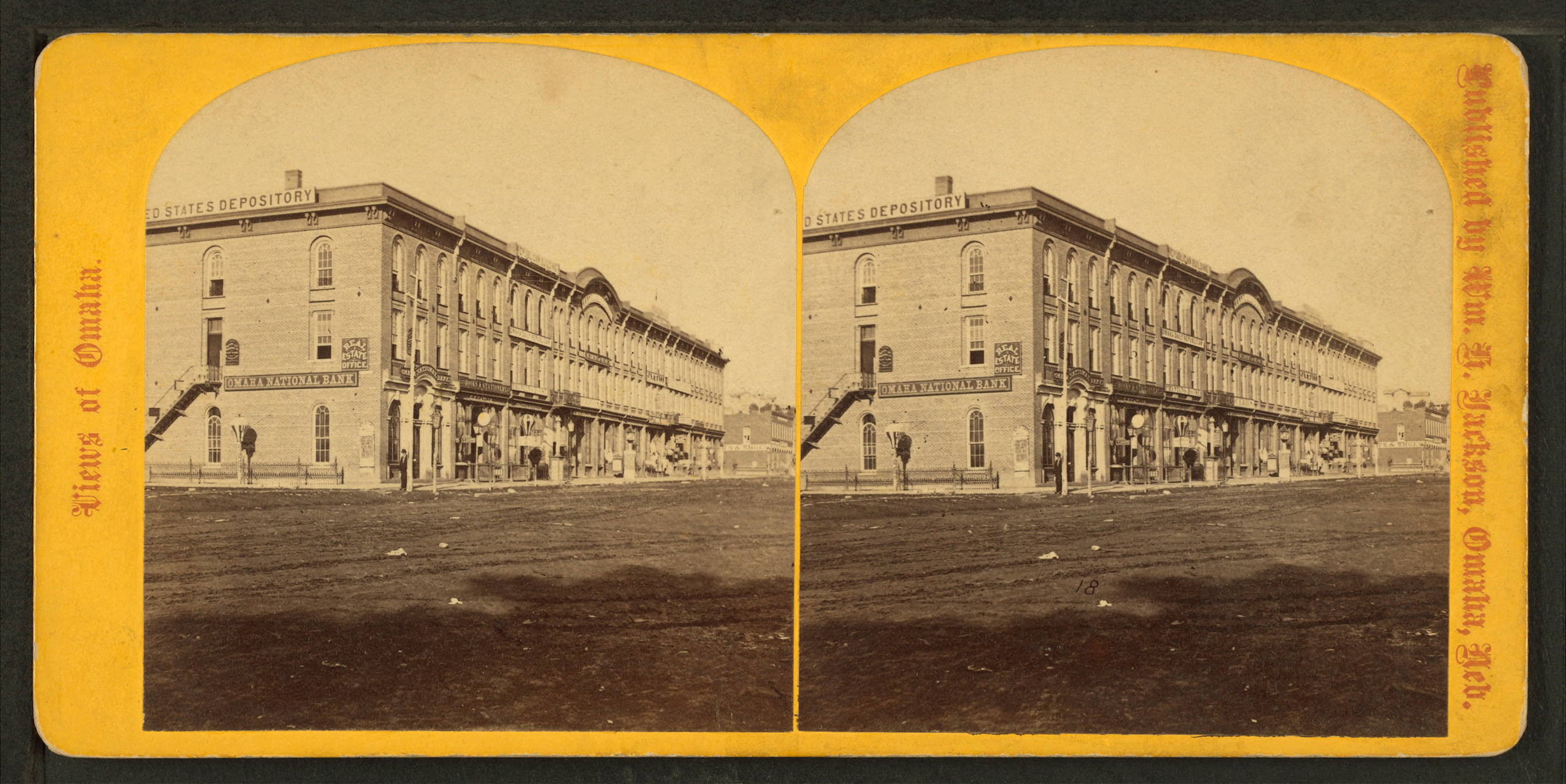
The original S. 13th Street location

Started in 1856, Omaha National Bank's original location was at 212 South 13th Street. In 1906 they purchased the building from the New York Life Insurance Company and renovated it completely.

Omaha pioneer Ezra Millard was the first president of Omaha National Bank. Future Omaha mayor and Nebraska Senator Joseph H. Millard was president of the Omaha National Bank after Millard's departure in 1871.

== Present ==
Omaha National Bank merged with another bank and moved out of the building in 1972. After being vacated it was slated for demolition. However, the building was rehabilitated in 1978 and converted to office space. Today, the building is called The Omaha Building, and it is home to the law firm Kutak Rock.

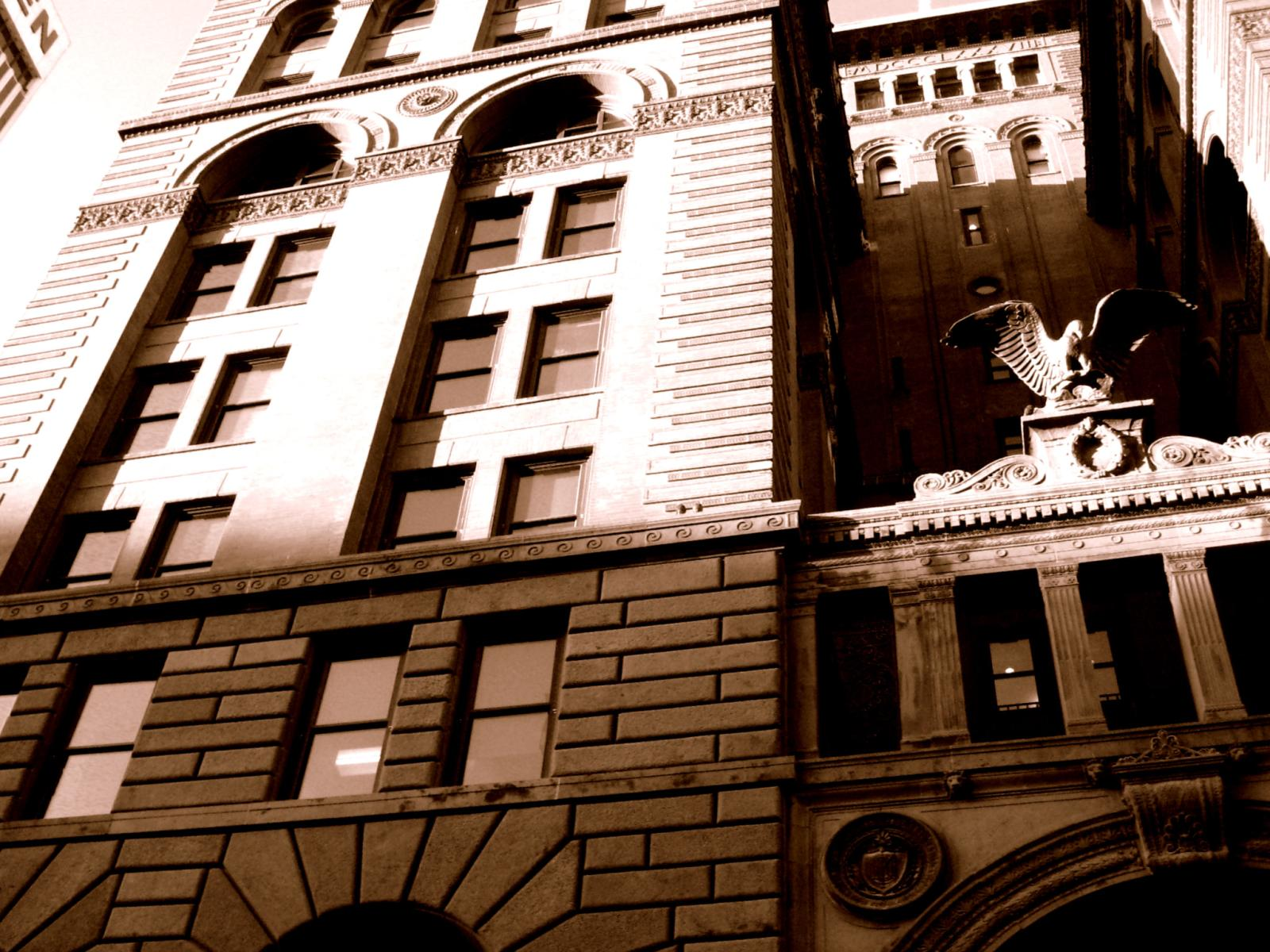
The Omaha National Bank Building

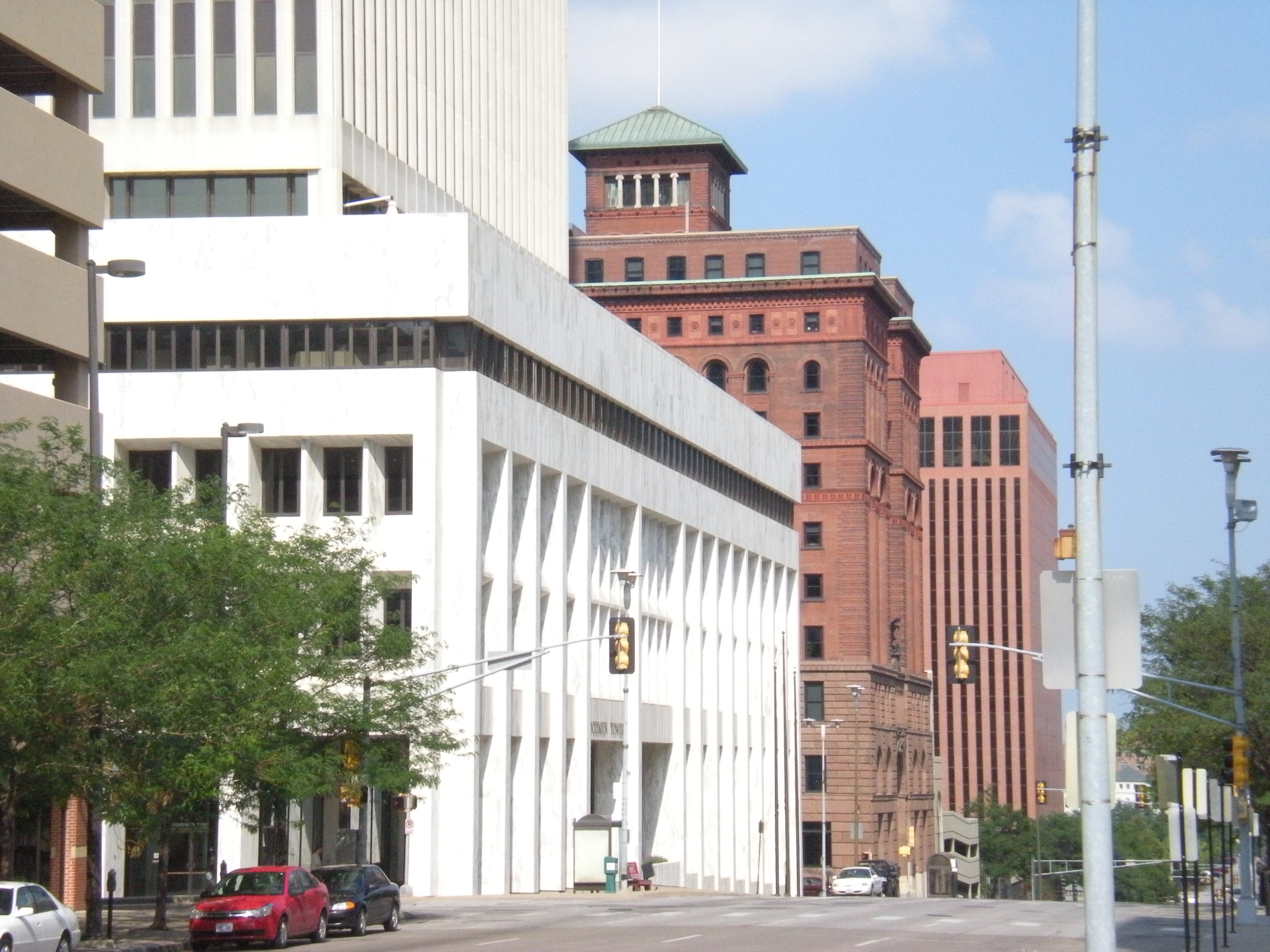
The Omaha National Bank Building at the base of the Woodmen Tower

== See also ==
- History of Omaha
- Economy of Omaha, Nebraska
