= Kersey Coates =

American businessman (1823–1887)

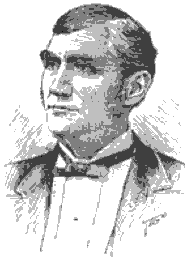
- Born: September 15, 1823; Salisbury, Pennsylvania
- Died: April 24, 1887 (aged 63); Kansas City, Missouri
- Education: Phillips Academy
- Occupation: Businessman
- Spouse: Sarah Walter Chandler (m. 1855)
- Children: 4

Kersey Coates (September 15, 1823 – April 24, 1887) was a businessman from Kansas City, in the U.S. state of Missouri, who developed Quality Hill, founded the Kansas City Board of Trade, and was among those who attracted the Hannibal & St. Joseph Railroad to the city.

== Biography ==
Born a Quaker in Salisbury, Pennsylvania, of Lindley Coates (1794–1856) and Deborah Simmons (1801–88), he was educated at Phillips Academy, Andover. He moved to Kansas City in 1854, a year after it was formally incorporated. He purchased land on the bluffs above the Missouri River on Quality Hill to develop an upscale neighborhood. In 1855 he married Sarah Walter Chandler, who was also from Pennsylvania and had come to the area with her family a year earlier. They had four children.

He was active in the Free State Movement during the Bleeding Kansas skirmishes with neighboring Kansas. During the American Civil War he became a colonel in the Missouri Militia. He turned his planned hotel at 10th and Broadway into a Union Cavalry stable. After the war the stable was to become the Coates House Hotel.

Coates developed the Perry Place subdivision in Church Hill between 8th and 12th Streets in Kansas City and only sold to African-Americans. This allowed for the creation of several churches and the area's first Black school, Lincoln High School.

Future Secretary of War Stephen B. Elkins served under Coates in the Battle of Lone Jack, the only battle in which Elkins served. Elkins was to say that the experience at Lone Jack filled him with disgust about war.

After the war, he along Robert T. Van Horn and Charles E. Kearney persuaded the Hannibal & St. Joseph Railroad to build the first bridge across the Missouri River in Kansas City at the Hannibal Bridge. The bridge made Kansas City rather than Leavenworth, Kansas, the dominant city of the region.

Kersey Coates died at his home in Kansas City, Missouri, on April 24, 1887.
