= Cissell =

Cissell is a surname. Notable people with the surname include:

- Bill Cissell (1904–1949), American baseball player
- Chris Cissell (born 1972), American soccer coach
- Howard Cissell (born 1936), American player of Canadian football
