= Dougherty–Prospect Heights Historic District =

Historic district in Missouri, United States

- U.S. National Register of Historic Places
- U.S. Historic district
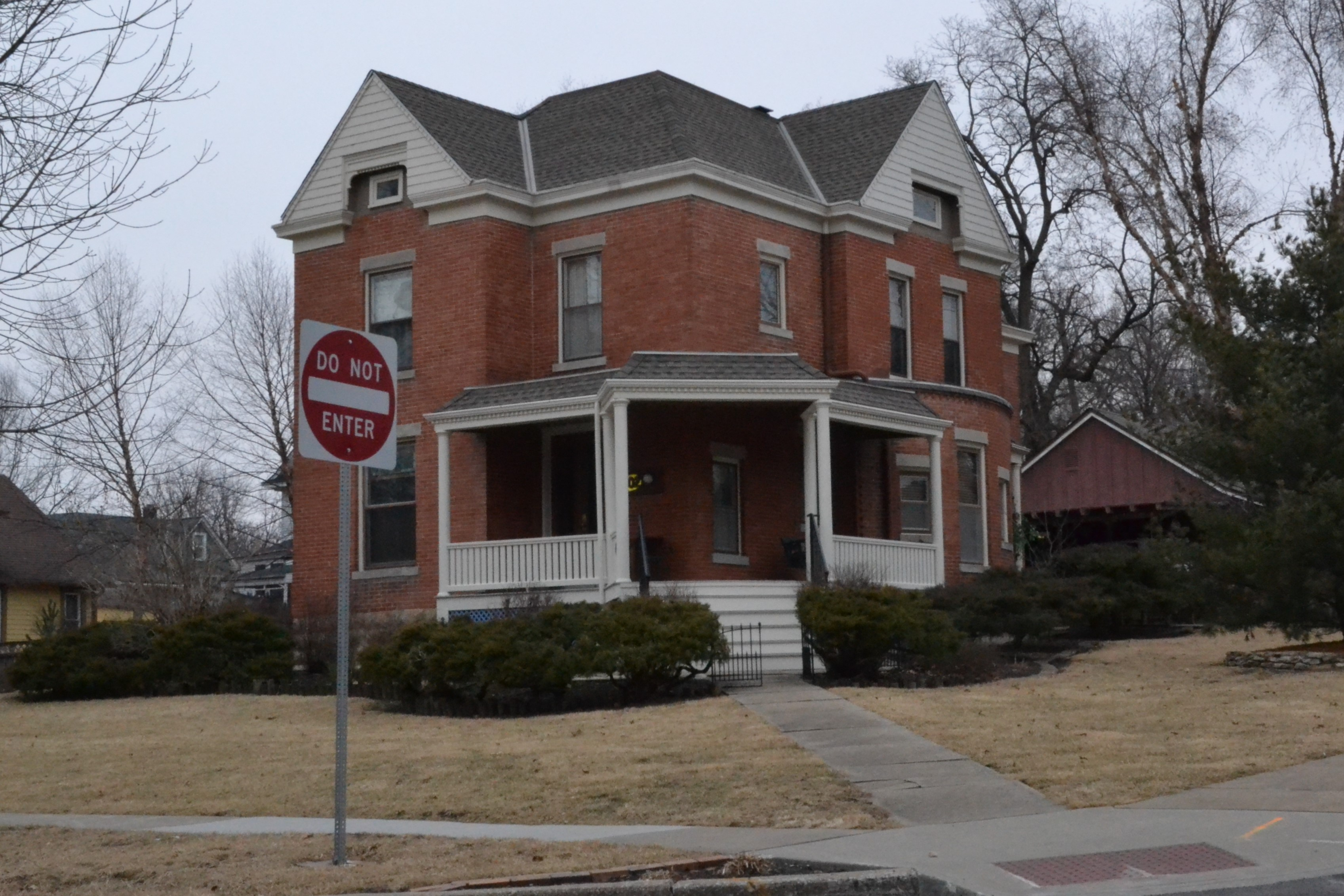
- 302 West Kansas Street

- Location within Missouri Location within the United States
- Location: Roughly bounded by Mississippi St., Gallatin St., Schrader St., and Fairview Ave., Liberty, Missouri
- Coordinates: 39°14′52″N 94°25′32″W
- Area: 42 acres (17 ha)
- Architectural style: Prairie School, Bungalow/craftsman, et al.
- MPS: Liberty, Clay County, Missouri MPS AD
- NRHP reference No.: 00001605
- Added to NRHP: January 4, 2001

Dougherty–Prospect Heights Historic District is a national historic district located at Liberty, Clay County, Missouri. It encompasses 139 contributing buildings in a predominantly residential section of Liberty. The district developed between about 1850 and 1946, and includes representative examples of Greek Revival, Queen Anne, Tudor Revival, Prairie School, American Foursquare / Shirtwaist and Bungalow / American Craftsman style residential architecture.

The district was listed on the National Register of Historic Places in 2001.
