= Miller Building =

Miller Building may refer to:

- Miller Building (Denver, Colorado), a Denver Landmark
- Miller-Davis Law Buildings, Bloomington, IL, listed on the National Register of Historic Places (NRHP) in McLean County, Illinois
- Miller Building (Davenport, Iowa), listed on the NRHP in Scott County, Iowa
- Ola Babcock Miller Building, listed on the NRHP in Polk County, Iowa as the Iowa State Historical Building
- Miller Brothers Building, Lexington, KY, listed on the NRHP in Fayette County, Kentucky
- Miller-Roy Building, Monroe, LA, listed on the NRHP in Ouachita Parish, Louisiana
- Miller Building, Matthews Hardware, Metropolitan Building, Columbia, MO, listed on the NRHP in Boone County, Missouri
- Miller Building (Liberty, Missouri), listed on the NRHP in Clay County, Missouri
- Miller Building (Portland, Maine), listed on the National Register of Historic Places
- Miller-Jackson Building, Oklahoma City, OK, listed on the NRHP in Oklahoma County, Oklahoma
- Miller Brothers Department Store, Chattanooga, TN, listed on the NRHP in Hamilton County, Tennessee
- I. Miller Building, landmark building in Manhattan, New York City
