= Odd Fellows Home District =

Historic district in Missouri, US

- U.S. National Register of Historic Places
- U.S. Historic district
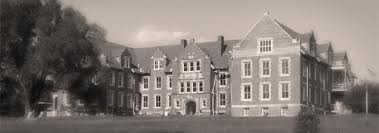
- Odd Fellows Home, September 2012

- Location within Missouri Location within the United States
- Location: MO 291, Liberty, Missouri
- Coordinates: 39°13′47″N 94°24′30″W
- Area: 36.3 acres (14.7 ha)
- Built: 1900
- Architect: Ittner, William B.; et al.
- Architectural style: Tudor Revival, Jacobethan Revival
- NRHP reference No.: 87001595
- Added to NRHP: September 15, 1987

Odd Fellows Home District is a national historic district located at Liberty, Clay County, Missouri. It encompasses three contributing buildings, one contributing site, and four contributing structures associated with an institutional home and hospital. The district developed between about 1900 and 1935, and representative examples of Tudor Revival and Jacobethan Revival architecture. The contributing buildings are the Administration Building, the Old Folks Building (1907-1908), and the Old Hospital (1923). Also on the property is the historic Odd Fellows Home Cemetery.

It was listed on the National Register of Historic Places in 1987.

== In popular culture ==
The Travel Channel's television show Destination Fear filmed at the haunted Odd Fellows Home for the sixth episode of their third season.
