= Greg Canuteson =

American lawyer and politician

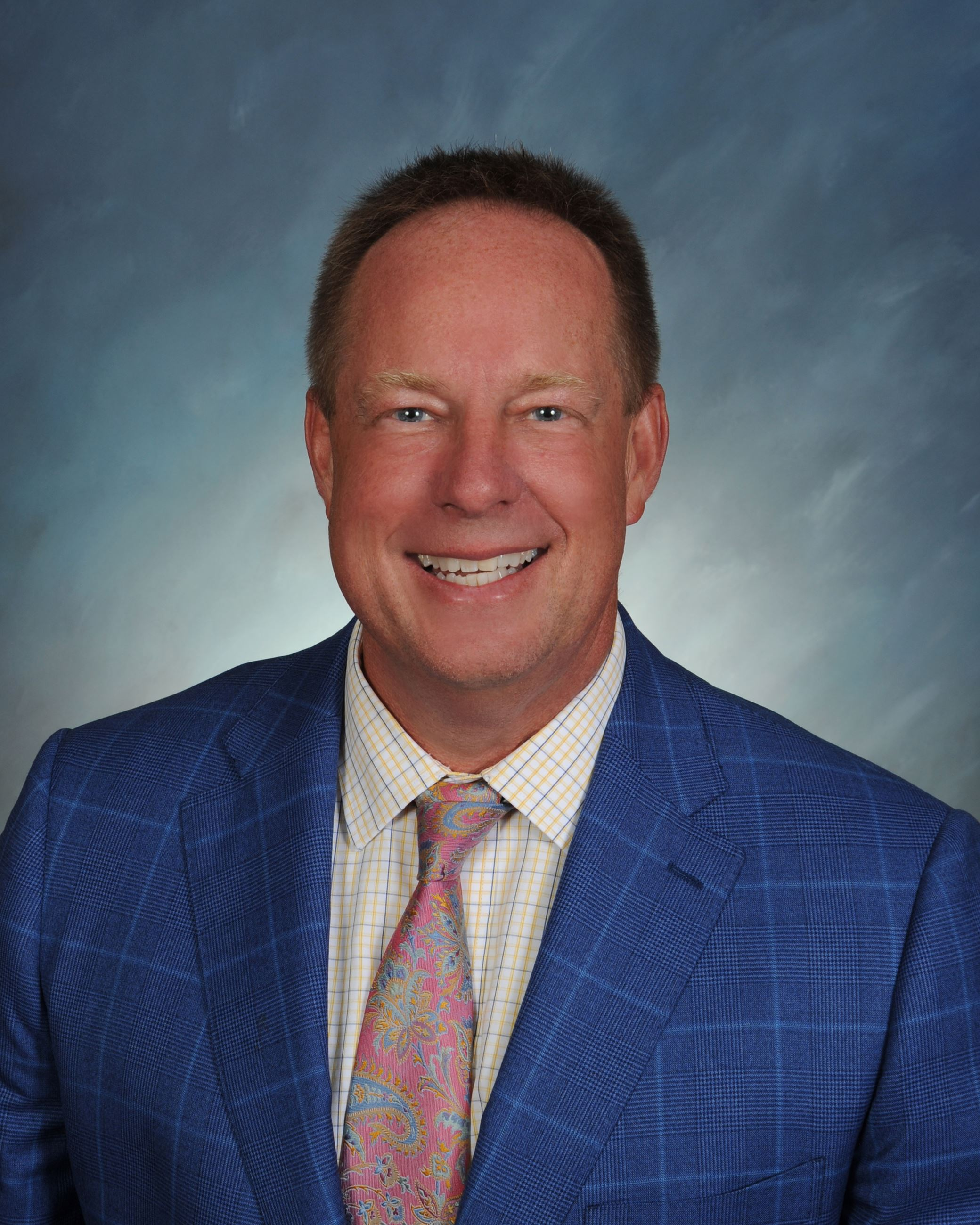

Mayor of Liberty, Missouri
- In office 2023, 2009 – 2013

Member of the Missouri House of Representatives from the 34th District
- In office 1993–1997

Personal details
- Born: May 30, 1967 (age 59) Madison, Wisconsin
- Party: Democratic
- Spouse: Divorced
- Education: William Jewell College University of Missouri School of Law

Greg Canuteson (born May 30, 1967) is an American lawyer and politician from Liberty, Missouri. A member of the Democratic Party, he served in the Missouri House of Representatives from 1992 through 1996. He later went on to be elected mayor of Liberty, Missouri in 2008. Mr. Canuteson is the current Mayor of Liberty Missouri beginning his latest term in 2023.
