= Parkway West High School (Missouri) =

American high school in Missouri

Location
- 14653 Clayton Road; Ballwin, Missouri 63011; United States; 38°37′22″N 90°32′5″W

Information
- Type: Public comprehensive high school
- Established: 1968; 58 years ago
- School district: Parkway School District
- NCES School ID: 292358001404
- Principal: John McCabe
- Teaching staff: 91.43 (on an FTE basis)
- Grades: 9–12
- Enrollment: 1,417 (2024–25)
- Student to teacher ratio: 15.50
- Campus: Suburban
- Colors: Red, Columbia blue, and white
- Athletics conference: Suburban Conference
- Nickname: Longhorns
- Newspaper: Pathfinder
- Website: westhigh.parkwayschools.net

Parkway West High School (PWHS) is a public comprehensive high school in Chesterfield, Missouri, US, that is part of the Parkway School District.

== History ==
Parkway West High School was the second high school built in the Parkway School District; it opened in fall 1968 with grades 10-12. In the 1969–70 school year, Parkway West Junior High was formed and grades 7-9 were housed in the West Senior building, operating on the same schedule as West Senior. For the 1970-71 school year, West Senior operated as a four-year high school (grades 9-12), with West Junior grades 7 and 8 attending Parkway South Junior High School on a split schedule. Members of the class of 1974 attended school in the West Senior building for five straight years. West Junior opened for the 1971–72 school year with the new "open classroom" layout. One of the unusual features of PWHS was that for 13 years, under the leadership of principal Al Burr, it operated without any written rules or regulations—only mutual agreements and expectations.

== Activities ==
For the 2013–14 school year, the school offered 28 activities approved by the Missouri State High School Activities Association (MSHSAA): baseball, boys' and girls' basketball, sideline cheerleading, boys' and girls' cross country, dance team, field hockey, 11-man football, boys' and girls' golf, girls' lacrosse, music activities, scholar bowl, boys' and girls' soccer, softball, speech and debate, boys' and girls' swimming and diving, boys' and girls' tennis, boys' and girls' track and field, boys' and girls' volleyball, water polo and wrestling. Parkway West students have won several state championships, including:

- Baseball: 1996
- Boys' basketball: 1991
- Boys' cross country: 1988, 1990
- Girls' cross country: 1989, 1990
- Girls' golf: 1980
- Boys' soccer: 1986
- Softball: 1988, 1992, 1993
- Boys' volleyball: 2003, 2021
- Water polo: 1984, 2012, 2014, 2021
- Boys' swimming and diving: 1975, 1977, 1978, 1980, 1981, 1982, 1985, 1986, 1987, 1988, 1993
- Girls' swimming and diving: 1977, 1978, 1979, 1980, 1981, 1982, 1985, 1986, 1987, 1988, 1994, 2011, 2020, 2021

== Notable alumni ==
- Rasheen Aldridge Jr., politician
- August Busch IV, ex-president and CEO of Anheuser-Busch
- Chip Caray, Baseball broadcaster
- Chris Cissell, head coach of women's soccer at UMKC, NSCAA/Adidas NAIA Men's National Coach of the Year in 2006
- Philip S. Davidson, admiral, US Navy
- Blaine Gabbert, backup quarterback for the Kansas City Chiefs and former quarterback for the Missouri Tigers
- Ed Hawthorne, former NFL football nose tackle
- Dionnah Jackson-Durrett, college basketball coach
- Matt Korklan, professional wrestler currently wrestling for Ring of Honor as Matt Sydal
- Brian Krolicki, former Lieutenant Governor of Nevada
- Pooja Kumar, actress and former Miss India USA
- Lucas May, former catcher in the Kansas City Royals organization
- Stone Phillips, former anchor of Dateline NBC, and gave the baccalaureate address for the Class of 1983
- Rigel Robinson, politician
- James Rollins (James Czajkowski), New York Times best-selling author
- Ken Schrader, NASCAR racer
- Nikko Smith, singer–songwriter, top 12 in American Idol season 4 and son of St. Louis Cardinals Hall of Famer Ozzie Smith
- Travis Stork, physician and TV personality most noted for appearing on The Bachelor season 8 and as host of the syndicated daytime talk show The Doctors
- Tuc Watkins, actor most noted for his role on One Life to Live, also played neighbor Bob Hunter on Desperate Housewives, 2007–2009
- Joe Williams, film critic of the St. Louis Post-Dispatch
