= Mt. Memorial Cemetery =

Historic cemetery in Liberty, Clay County, Missouri, US

- U.S. National Register of Historic Places
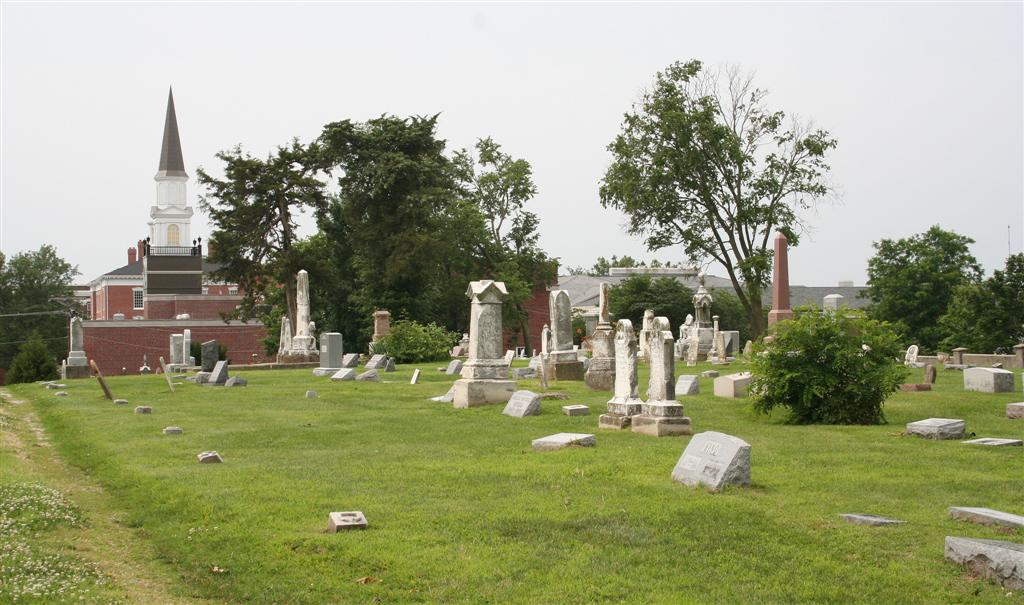
- Mt. Memorial Cemetery, July 2008

- Location within Missouri Location within the United States
- Location: 500 block E. Mississippi St., Liberty, Missouri
- Coordinates: 39°14′56″N 94°24′45″W
- Area: 1.4 acres (0.57 ha)
- Built: c. 1828
- NRHP reference No.: 12000231
- Added to NRHP: April 24, 2012

Mt. Memorial Cemetery, also known as The Old Gravevard, is a historic cemetery located on the campus of William Jewell College in Liberty, Clay County, Missouri. It was established about 1828, and contains 554 documented burials. The cemetery is rectangular in plan and measures approximately 140 feet by 435 feet.

It was listed on the National Register of Historic Places in 2012.
