= William Jewell College =

Private college in Liberty, Missouri, US

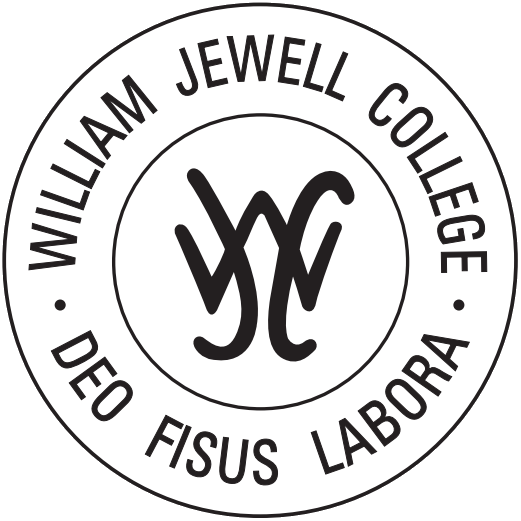
- Motto: Deo Fisus Labora (Latin)
- Motto in English: Trust in God, Work
- Type: Private liberal arts college
- Established: 1849; 177 years ago
- Academic affiliations: Annapolis Group
- President: Susan Chambers (interim)
- Students: 853 (fall 2022)
- Location: Liberty, Missouri, U.S. 39.246263°N 94.412159°W
- Campus: Suburban
- Colors: Black and red
- Nickname: Cardinals
- Sporting affiliations: NCAA Division II - GLVC
- Website: jewell.edu
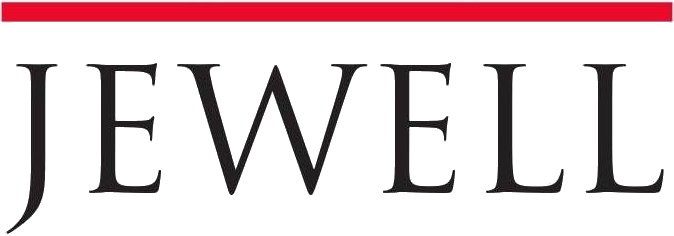

William Jewell College is a private liberal arts college in Liberty, Missouri, United States. It was founded in 1849 by members of the Missouri Baptist Convention and endowed with $10,000 by William Jewell. It was associated with the Missouri Baptist Convention for over 150 years until it separated in 2003 and became independent. After becoming a nonsectarian institution, the college's enrollment fell by approximately 40% to 739 students in 2018. Jewell is accredited by the Higher Learning Commission.

== History ==
=== Founding ===
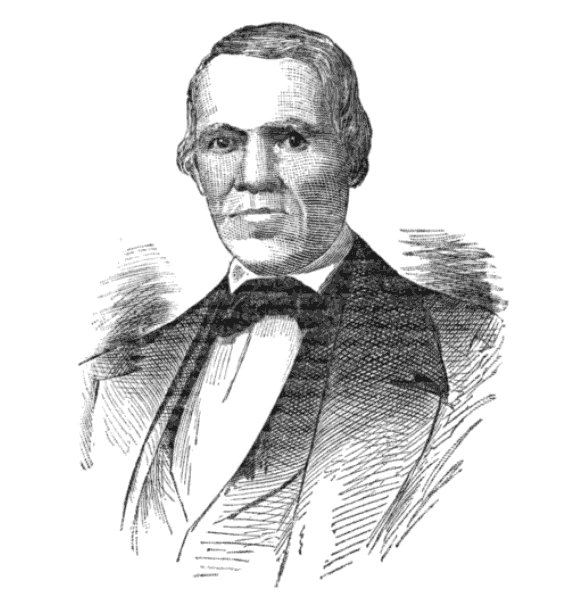
William Jewell

The college is named after William Jewell, who in 1849 donated $10,000 to start a school. Jewell, who was from Columbia, Missouri, had wanted the school built in Boonville, Missouri. However, Liberty resident Alexander William Doniphan argued that donated undeveloped land in Liberty would be more valuable than the proposed developed land in Boonville, and Liberty was eventually chosen. Judge James Turner Vance Thompson donated the hilltop land on which the campus sits. In the American Civil War during the Battle of Liberty, the main building on campus, Jewell Hall, was used as a hospital, infirmary, and stables for the United States Army. Union troops were buried on the campus. It was listed on the National Register of Historic Places in 1978. The Mt. Memorial Cemetery, listed on the National Register of Historic Places in 2012, is located on the campus grounds. One of the school's founders was Baptist minister Robert S. James, father of Jesse James.

On February 13, 1913, the nearby Liberty Female Institute, also known as the Liberty Ladies' College, was destroyed in a fire, which brought female students to Jewell. The unanticipated merger developed slowly, but by 1920 the women of the ladies' college were admitted to William Jewell on the same terms as men.

=== Gano Chapel ===
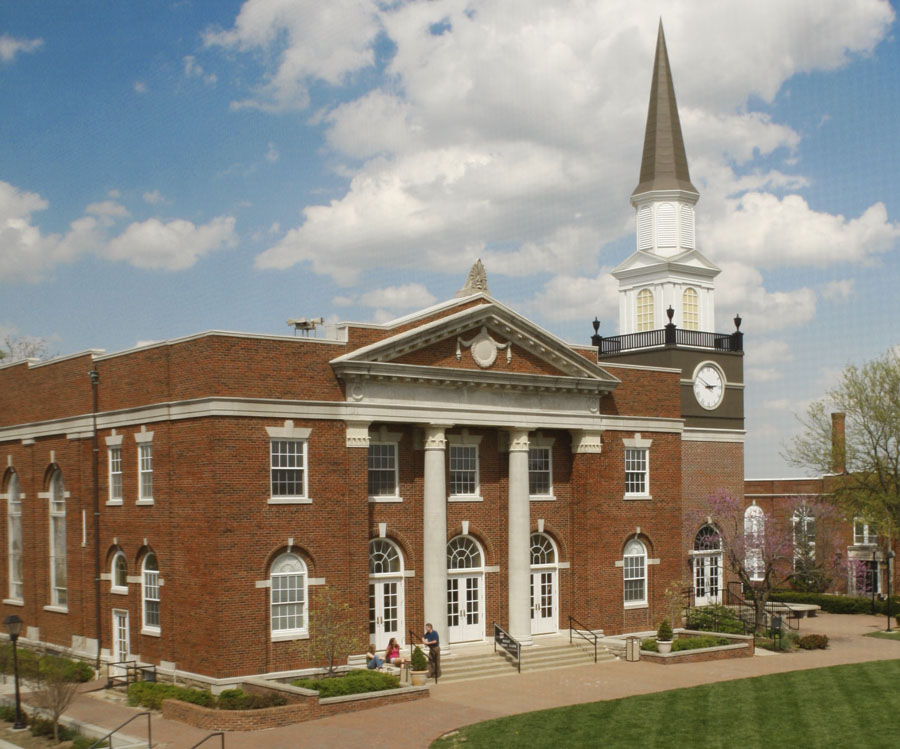
Gano Chapel in 2010

In 1926, the John Gano chapel was built, based on a donation from Gano's great-granddaughter Elizabeth Price, who lived in Kansas City. Price gave the money for the chapel with provisions that the chapel be named for Gano and that it hang a painting of Gano baptizing George Washington in the Potomac River during the American Revolutionary War. The college says the painting is one of the school's most popular tourist destinations and takes no stance on whether the baptism of Washington (who was an Episcopalian) actually took place.

=== Pryor Learning Commons ===
In August 2013, William Jewell College opened Pryor Learning Commons, a 26,000-square-foot intellectual center.

== Academics ==
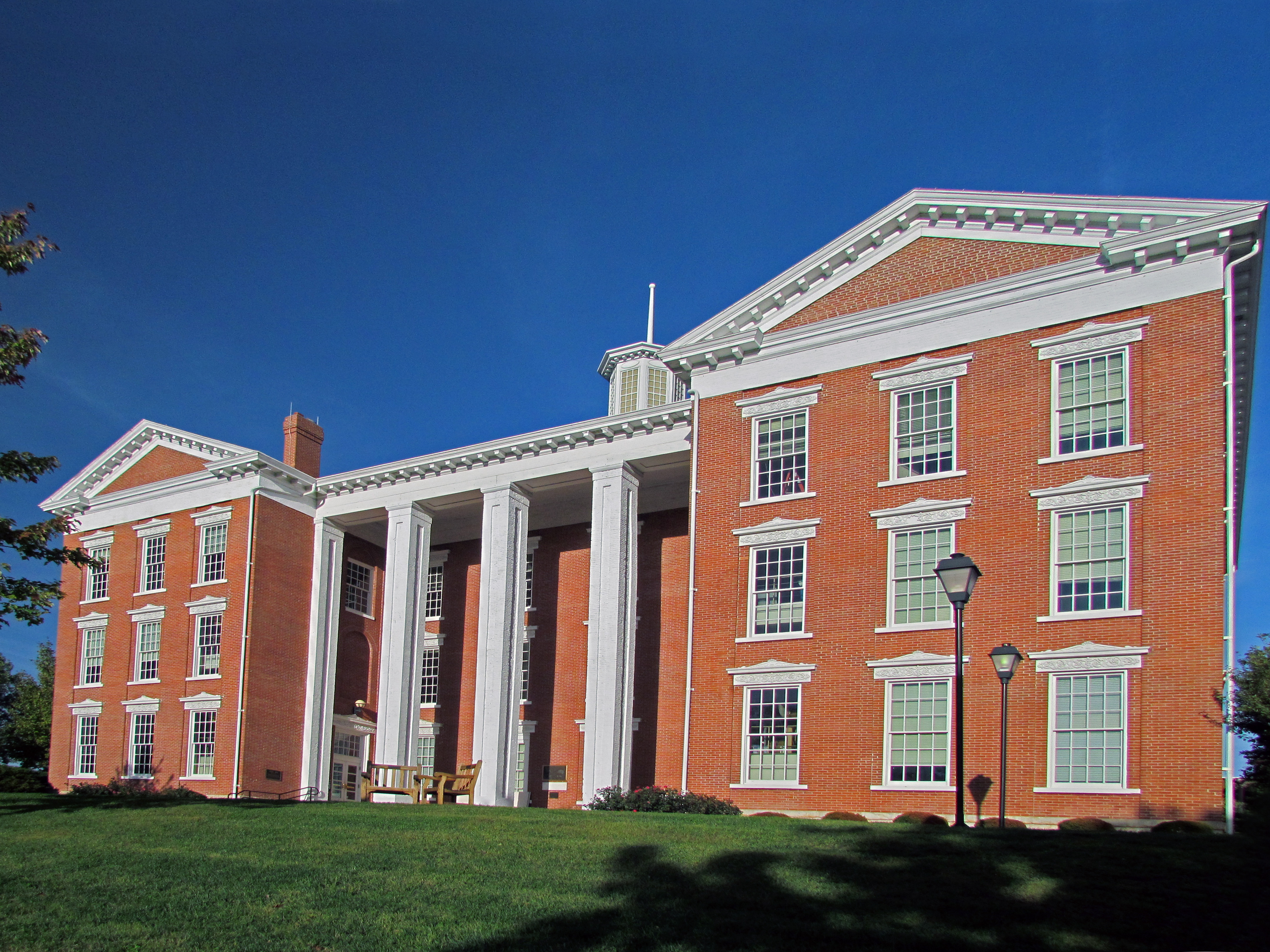
Jewell Hall in 2012

The college offers nearly 40 academic majors and 10 pre-professional programs.

William Jewell College also provides an Oxbridge Honors Program. Oxbridge majors take tutorials in their major, study abroad in Oxford, and take comprehensive exams during their senior year. The college offers a Journey Grant program in which students can qualify for a minimum $2,000 grant to use their junior year of school to help create an educational experience like study abroad, leadership and service projects, internships, research, business projects, etc.

In 2019, William Jewell started the Honors Institute in Critical Thinking, a scholarship honors program that delves into analytical thinking with a self-designed practicum centered around a world issue.

Since 2013, the college claimed three Fulbright Scholars, two Goldwater Scholars, one Rhodes Global Scholar international finalist, two Truman Scholar finalists, one Rotary International Scholarship and ten Teach For America corps members.

The college offers three graduate programs, all approved by the Higher Learning Commission: The Master of Arts in Teaching, the Master of Science in Curriculum and Instruction, and the Artist Diploma in Voice (certificate program).

== Athletics ==
The William Jewell athletic teams are called the Cardinals. The college is a member of the NCAA Division II ranks, primarily competing in the Great Lakes Valley Conference (GLVC) since the 2011–12 academic year. Prior to joining the NCAA, the Cardinals previously competed in the Heart of America Conference (HAAC) of the National Association of Intercollegiate Athletics (NAIA) from 1971–72 to 2010–11; and in the Missouri College Athletic Union (MCAU) from 1924–25 to 1970–71.

== Greek life ==
There are several fraternities and sororities on campus, with its first chapter being formed in 1871.

== Notable alumni ==
- Cyrus Avery (1871–1963), businessman and "Father of Route 66"
- Eugene Monroe Bartlett (1885–1941), singer, songwriter and producer of gospel music.
- Daniel Belcher, Grammy-winning operatic baritone
- Edwin Charles Boulton (A.B., 1950), a bishop of the United Methodist Church
- Nancy Boyda, deputy assistant secretary of defense for manpower and personnel; former Democratic congresswoman from Kansas, 2007–2009
- Hilary A. Bush (BA 1926), Missouri lieutenant governor
- Greg Canuteson, former state representative and Mayor of Liberty
- Robin Carnahan, Missouri Secretary of State, 2005–2013
- Tom Carnegie (AB 1942), track announcer from 1946 to 2006
- Donald Marolf (1984), theoretical physicist and professor at University of California, Santa Barbara
- Chris Cissell (A.B., 1994), women's soccer coach
- Russ Cline, co-founder of Eagle Pro Box Lacrosse League (now called National Lacrosse League), owner of Philadelphia Wings
- Earl Thomas Coleman, Republican congressman from Missouri, 1977–1993
- Jim Davis, actor, portrayed Jock Ewing on "Dallas" TV series
- Joseph K. Dixon, Photography and advocate for American Indian rights
- Connie Dover, Celtic and American music folk singer, songwriter
- Homer Drew, head basketball coach at Valparaiso University, 1988–2002, 2003–2011
- Zel Fischer, Missouri Supreme Court Judge
- Nino Giarratano (born 1962), baseball coach
- Hellar Grabbi (1929-2018), journalist and editor
- James B. Graham, former Kentucky Auditor of Public Accounts and former Kentucky Superintendent of Public Instruction
- William Hardin Harrison, US Army general
- Larry Holley, basketball coach
- Manley Ottmer Hudson, judge of the Permanent Court of International Justice
- James J. Jenkins, psychologist
- Brian Knight Major League Baseball Umpire since 2011
- Dan Lanning, Head football coach, University of Oregon
- Gatewood Lincoln, 19th and 22nd Governor of American Samoa (did not graduate)
- Don Page (BA 1971), theoretical physicist at the University of Alberta.
- David Ring, motivational speaker with cerebral palsy
- Roy Sanders, former professional baseball player
- Bill Snyder (A.B., 1962), head American football coach for Kansas State University, 1989–2005; 2009–2018
- Josephine L. Staton, United States federal district judge on the United States District Court for the Central District of California
- Orvar Swenson (1933), pediatric surgeon
- Terry Teachout, biographer, playwright, opera librettist, drama critic
- JD Gravina (B.S. 2000), basketball coach at Western Illinois University
