= Arthur–Leonard Historic District =

Historic district in Missouri, United States

- U.S. National Register of Historic Places
- U.S. Historic district
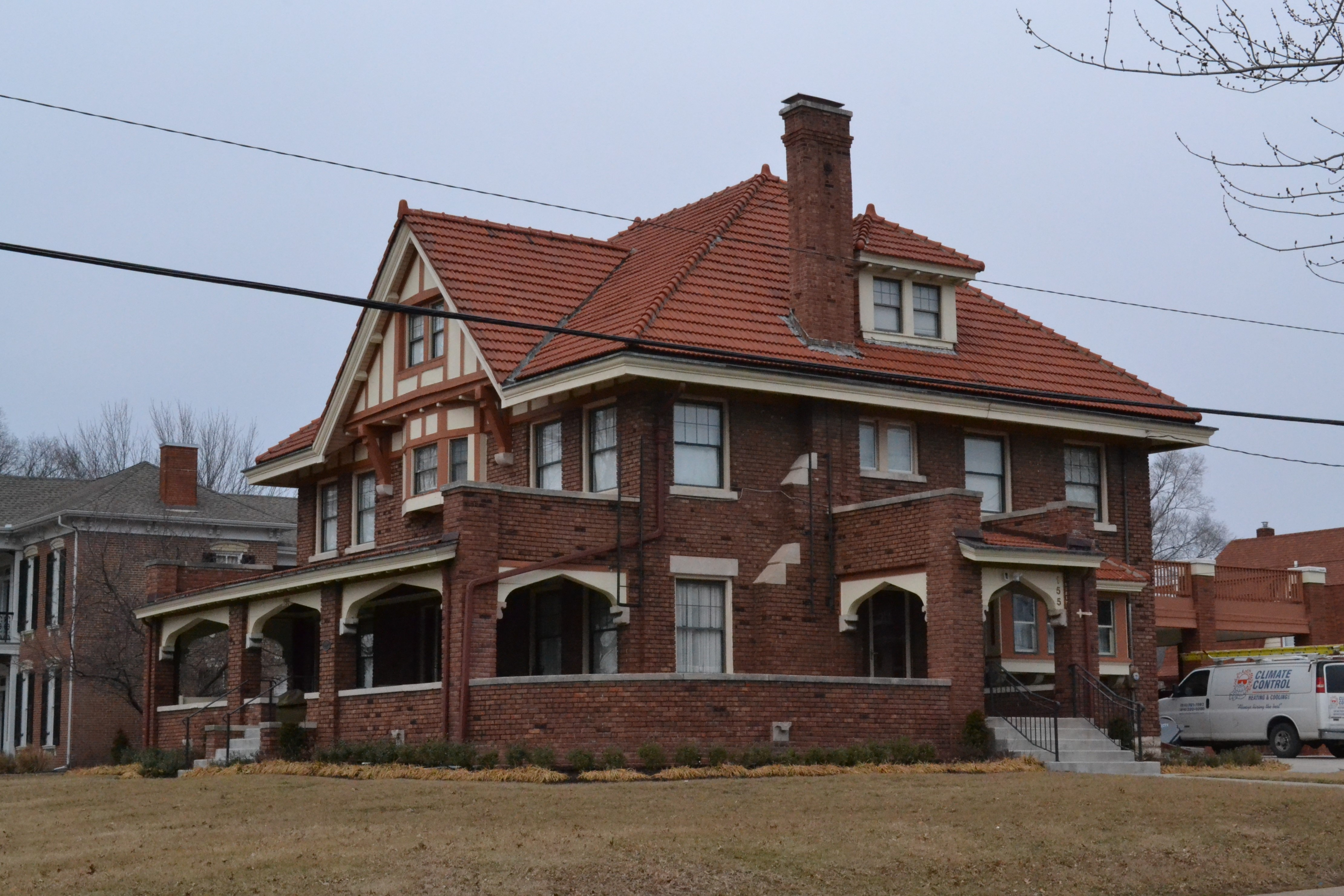
- Hunt-Clarke House

- Location within Missouri Location within the United States
- Location: Roughly bounded by Ford Ave., Jewell St., Choctaw St., and Missouri St., Liberty, Missouri
- Coordinates: 39°14′41″N 94°24′56″W
- Area: 11 acres (4.5 ha)
- Architectural style: Prairie School, Bungalow/craftsman, et al.
- MPS: Liberty, Clay County, Missouri MPS AD
- NRHP reference No.: 00001608
- Added to NRHP: January 4, 2001

Arthur–Leonard Historic District is a national historic district located at Liberty, Clay County, Missouri. It encompasses 36 contributing buildings in a predominantly residential section of Liberty. The district developed between about 1868 and 1946, and includes representative examples of Greek Revival, Queen Anne, Prairie School, and Bungalow / American Craftsman style residential architecture.

It was listed on the National Register of Historic Places in 2001.
