= Jewell Hall =

- U.S. National Register of Historic Places
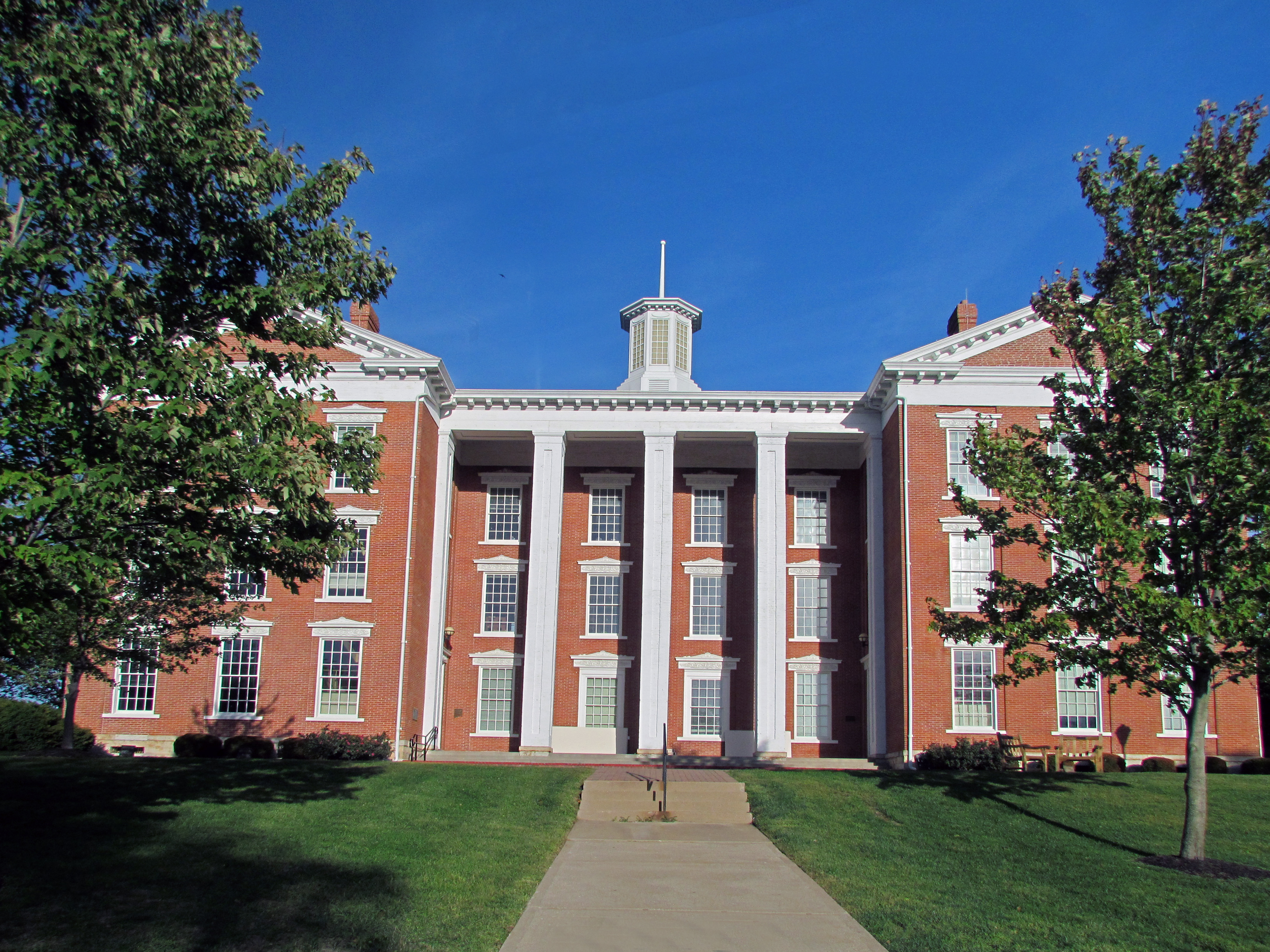
- Jewell Hall, September 2012

- Location within Missouri Location within the United States
- Location: Jewell St. between Kansas and Mississippi Sts., Liberty, Missouri
- Coordinates: 39°14′49″N 94°24′44″W
- Area: 2 acres (0.81 ha)
- Built: 1850-1853
- Architect: Jewell, William; Sawyer, J.O.
- Architectural style: Classical Revival
- NRHP reference No.: 78001642
- Added to NRHP: September 6, 1978

Jewell Hall is a historic building located on the campus of William Jewell College at Liberty, Clay County, Missouri. It was built between 1850 and 1853, and is a three-story, modified "H"-plan, Classical Revival style brick and Missouri limestone building. The building measures 120 feet in length and 66 feet in width. It features a colonnade of square columns which spans a recessed, central portico. The interior of Jewell Hall was completely remodelled in 1946–1948.

It was listed on the National Register of Historic Places in 1978.
