= Liberty, Missouri =

City in Missouri, U.S.

- City
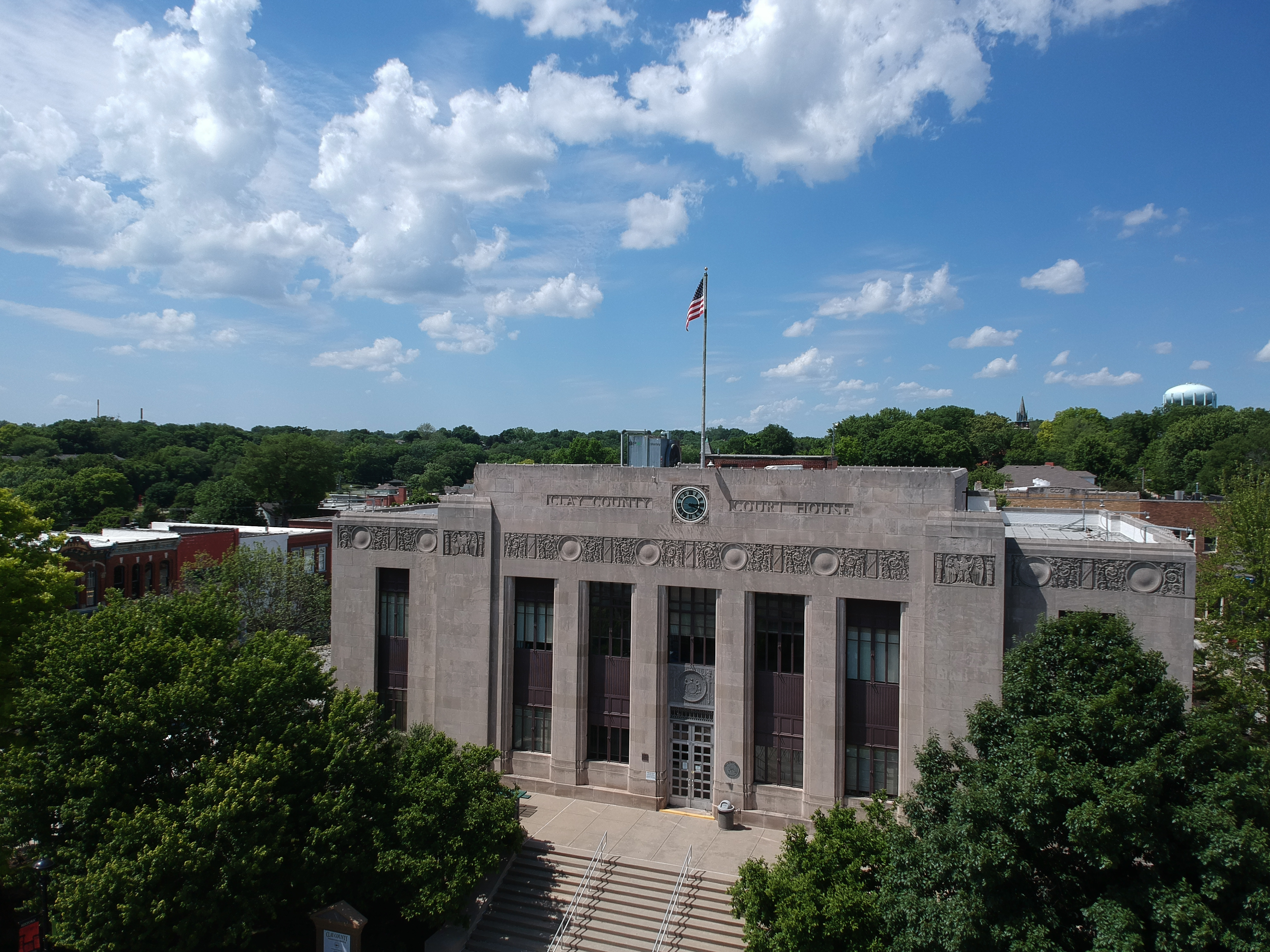
- Historic Clay County Courthouse in Liberty, Missouri

- Location in the state of Missouri and in Clay County
- Coordinates: 39°14′27″N 94°25′08″W
- Country: United States
- State: Missouri
- County: Clay
- Incorporated: May 7, 1829 (as a town), 1851 (as a city)

Government
  - Type: Mayor-Council-Administrator
  - Mayor: Greg Canuteson

Area
  - Total: 29.16 sq mi (75.52 km^{2})
  - Land: 29.03 sq mi (75.19 km^{2})
  - Water: 0.13 sq mi (0.33 km^{2})
- Elevation: 863 ft (263 m)

Population (2020)
  - Total: 30,167
  - Density: 1,039.1/sq mi (401.19/km^{2})
- Time zone: UTC−6 (CST)
  - Summer (DST): UTC−5 (CDT)
- ZIP codes: 64068, 64069
- Area codes: 816, 913
- FIPS code: 29-42032
- GNIS feature ID: 2395700
- Website: www.libertymissouri.gov

Liberty is a city in and the county seat of Clay County, Missouri, United States and is a suburb of Kansas City, located in the Kansas City Metro Area. As of the 2020 United States census the population was 30,167. Liberty is home to William Jewell College and the historic Liberty Jail.

== History ==
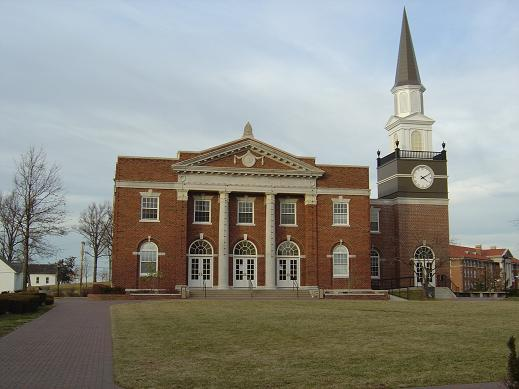
Gano Chapel from the Quad in 2004 after the clock tower had been repaired following the 2003 tornado.

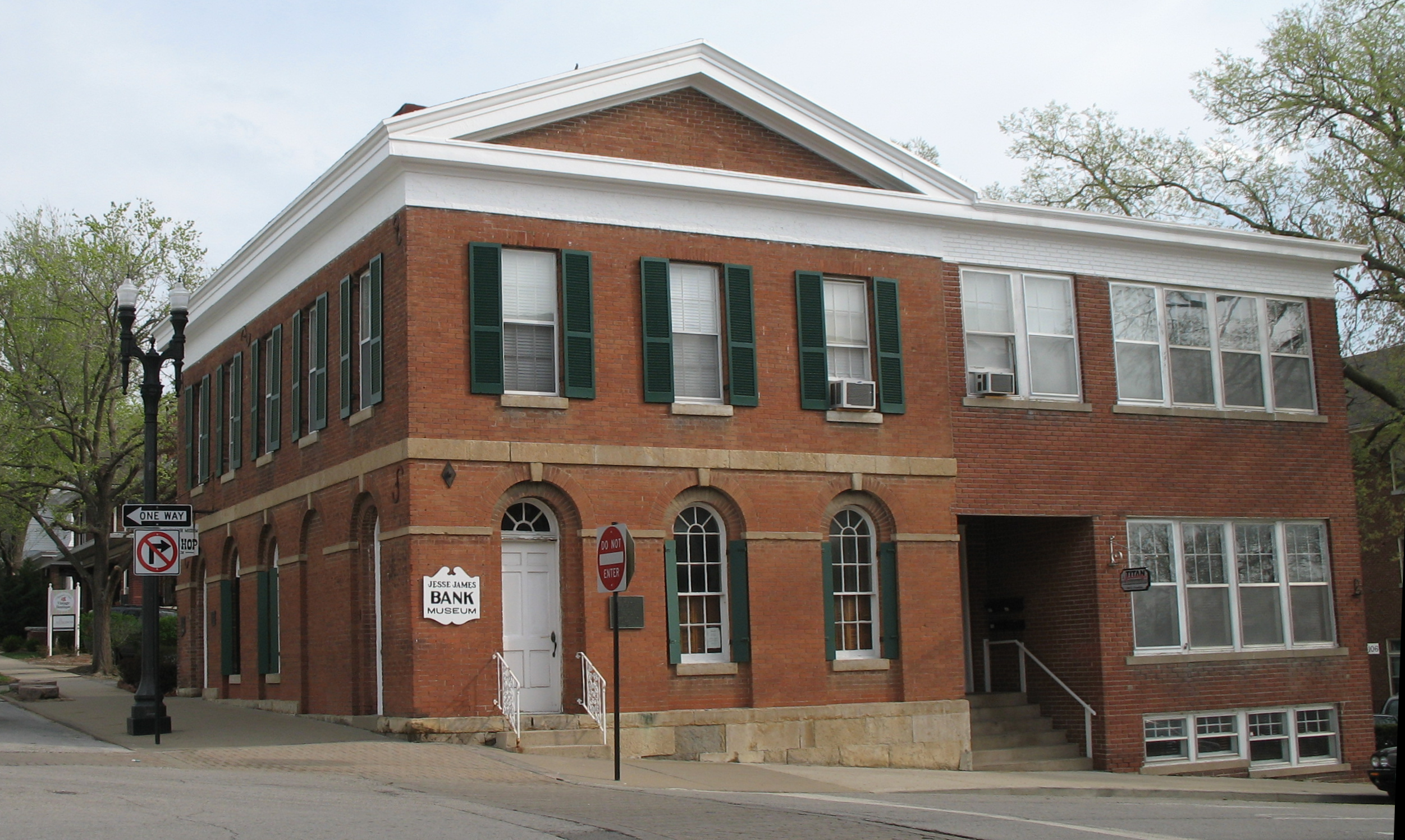
Clay County Savings Association building

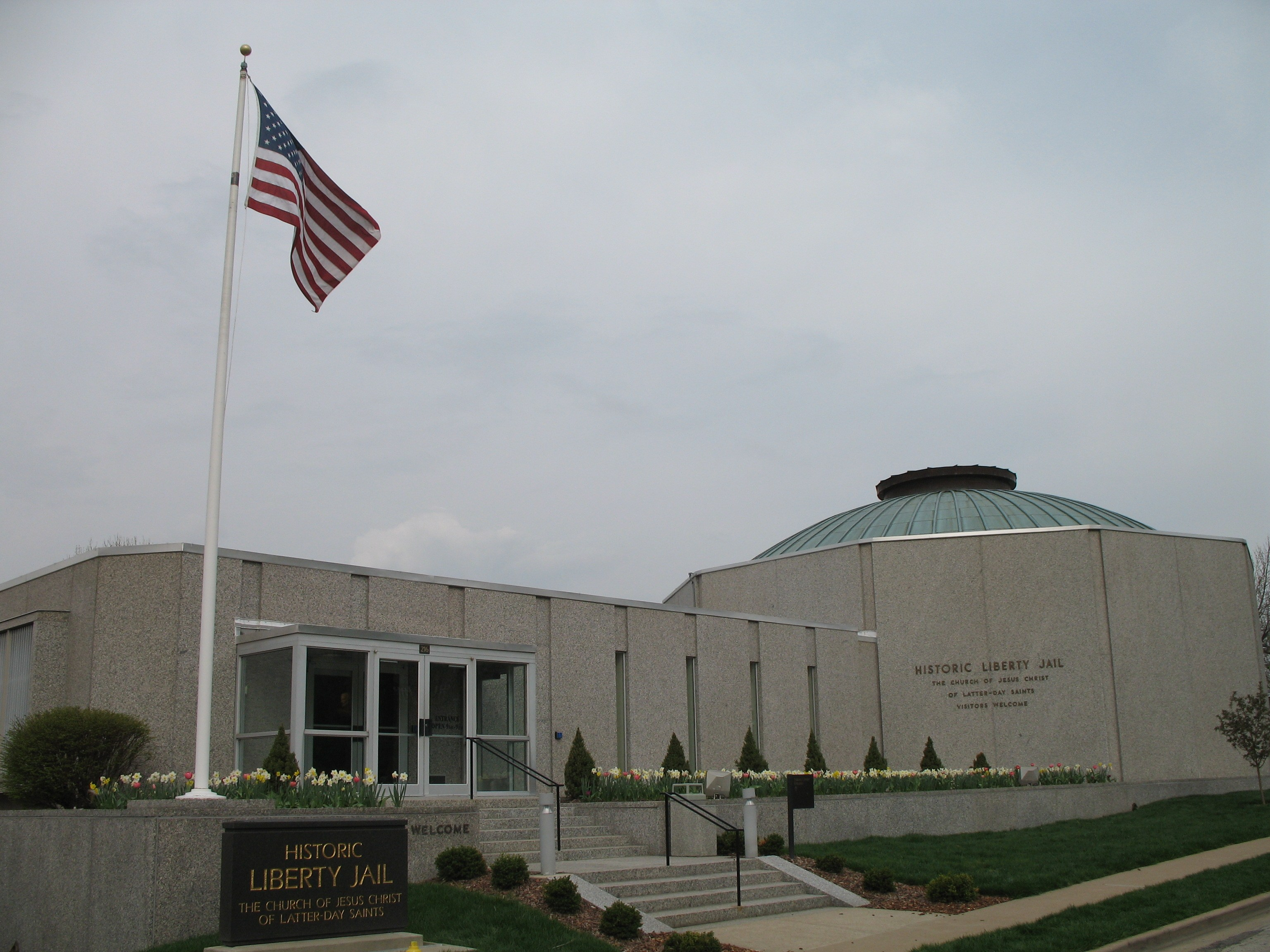
Historic Liberty Jail museum

Liberty was settled in 1822, and shortly later became the county seat of Clay County. The city was named for the American concept of liberty.

In 1830, David Rice Atchison established a law office in Liberty. He was joined three years later by colleague Alexander William Doniphan. The two argued cases defending the rights of Mormon settlers in Jackson County, served Northwest Missouri in Missouri's General Assembly, and labored for the addition of the Platte Purchase to Missouri's boundaries.

In October 1838, the two were ordered by Governor Lilburn Boggs to arrest Mormon founder Joseph Smith Jr. at the Far West settlement in Caldwell County. Immediately after the conclusion of the Mormon War, Smith and other Mormon leaders were incarcerated at the Liberty Jail for the winter as Doniphan labored for a quicker trial date. Although Doniphan led a force of Missouri volunteers ordered to capture the leaders, he defended Joseph Smith in trial and won him a change in venue. While en route to their new venue, Smith and his followers escaped and left Missouri for the new Mormon settlement in Nauvoo, Illinois.

The Arthur-Leonard Historic District, Clay County Savings Association Building, Clinton House, Dougherty-Prospect Heights Historic District, Garrison School Historic District, Frank Hughes Memorial Library, IOOF Liberty Lodge No. 49, Jewell Hall, Jewell-Lightburne Historic District, Major Hotel, Miller Building, Mt. Memorial Cemetery, Nebo Hill Archeological Site, Odd Fellows Home District, South Liberty Courthouse Square Historic District, and West Liberty Courthouse Square Historic District are listed on the National Register of Historic Places.

== Geography ==
Liberty is located approximately six miles north of the Missouri River along I-35 and Missouri Route 291.

According to the United States Census Bureau, the city has a total area of 29.15 square miles (75.50 km^{2}), of which 29.03 square miles (75.19 km^{2}) is land and 0.12 square miles (0.31 km^{2}) is water.

== Demographics ==
Historical population
Census	Pop.	Note	%±
1850	827		—
1860	1,288		55.7%
1870	1,700		32.0%
1880	1,476		−13.2%
1890	2,558		73.3%
1900	2,407		−5.9%
1910	2,980		23.8%
1920	3,097		3.9%
1930	3,516		13.5%
1940	3,598		2.3%
1950	4,709		30.9%
1960	8,909		89.2%
1970	13,704		53.8%
1980	16,251		18.6%
1990	20,459		25.9%
2000	26,232		28.2%
2010	29,149		11.1%
2020	30,167		3.5%
U.S. Decennial Census 2020

=== Racial and ethnic composition ===
Liberty city, Missouri – Racial and ethnic composition Note: the US Census treats Hispanic/Latino as an ethnic category. This table excludes Latinos from the racial categories and assigns them to a separate category. Hispanics/Latinos may be of any race.
Race / Ethnicity (NH = Non-Hispanic)	Pop 2000	Pop 2010	Pop 2020	% 2000	% 2010	% 2020
White alone (NH)	24,236	25,836	24,858	92.39%	88.63%	82.40%
Black or African American alone (NH)	661	1,021	1,349	2.52%	3.50%	4.47%
Native American or Alaska Native alone (NH)	99	124	103	0.38%	0.43%	0.34%
Asian alone (NH)	159	282	303	0.61%	0.97%	1.00%
Native Hawaiian or Pacific Islander alone (NH)	16	27	46	0.06%	0.09%	0.15%
Other race alone (NH)	22	30	90	0.08%	0.10%	0.30%
Mixed race or Multiracial (NH)	336	641	1,730	1.28%	2.20%	5.73%
Hispanic or Latino (any race)	703	1,188	1,688	2.68%	4.08%	5.60%
Total	26,232	29,149	30,167	100.00%	100.00%	100.00%

=== 2020 census ===
As of the 2020 census, Liberty had a population of 30,167 in 11,341 households and 7,602 families. The population density was 1,039.2 per square mile (401.2/km^{2}).

The median age was 37.8 years; 24.5% of residents were under the age of 18 and 15.6% were 65 years of age or older. For every 100 females there were 96.3 males, and for every 100 females age 18 and over there were 92.3 males age 18 and over.

97.0% of residents lived in urban areas, while 3.0% lived in rural areas.

There were 12,042 housing units, of which 5.8% were vacant. The homeowner vacancy rate was 1.2% and the rental vacancy rate was 10.4%.

Of the 11,341 households, 34.3% had children under the age of 18 living in them. Of all households, 52.3% were married-couple households, 15.8% were households with a male householder and no spouse or partner present, and 25.9% were households with a female householder and no spouse or partner present. About 25.8% of all households were made up of individuals and 10.6% had someone living alone who was 65 years of age or older. The average household size was 2.8, and the average family size was 3.3.

Racial composition as of the 2020 census
Race	Number	Percent
White	25,391	84.2%
Black or African American	1,378	4.6%
American Indian and Alaska Native	139	0.5%
Asian	303	1.0%
Native Hawaiian and Other Pacific Islander	46	0.2%
Some other race	478	1.6%
Two or more races	2,432	8.1%

=== 2016–2020 American Community Survey ===
The 2016–2020 5-year American Community Survey estimates show that the median household income was $78,184 (with a margin of error of +/- $5,139) and the median family income was $90,839 (+/- $5,167). Males had a median income of $48,640 (+/- $3,513) versus $32,463 (+/- $1,897) for females. The median income for those above 16 years old was $40,538 (+/- $2,938). Approximately, 3.3% of families and 7.0% of the population were below the poverty line, including 8.0% of those under the age of 18 and 4.8% of those ages 65 or over.

=== 2010 census ===
As of the census of 2010, there were 29,149 people, 10,582 households, and 7,555 families living in the city. The population density was 1,004.1 inhabitants per square mile (387.7/km^{2}). There were 11,284 housing units at an average density of 388.7 per square mile (150.1/km^{2}). The racial makeup of the city was 91.4% White, 3.6% African American, 0.5% Native American, 1.0% Asian, 0.1% Pacific Islander, 0.9% from other races, and 2.6% from two or more races. Hispanic or Latino of any race were 4.1% of the population.

There were 10,582 households, of which 38.2% had children under the age of 18 living with them, 56.4% were married couples living together, 11.0% had a female householder with no husband present, 4.0% had a male householder with no wife present, and 28.6% were non-families. 23.4% of all households were made up of individuals, and 8% had someone living alone who was 65 years of age or older. The average household size was 2.63 and the average family size was 3.11.

The median age in the city was 36.4 years. 26.6% of residents were under the age of 18; 9.8% were between the ages of 18 and 24; 26% were from 25 to 44; 26.5% were from 45 to 64; and 11.1% were 65 years of age or older. The gender makeup of the city was 48.7% male and 51.3% female.

=== 2000 census ===
As of the census of 2000, there were 26,232 people, 9,511 households, and 6,943 families living in the city. The population density was 973.3 inhabitants per square mile (375.8/km^{2}). There were 9,973 housing units at an average density of 370.0 per square mile (142.9/km^{2}). The racial makeup of the city was 93.75% White, 2.59% African American, 0.40% Native American, 0.61% Asian, 0.06% Pacific Islander, 0.99% from other races, and 1.59% from two or more races. Hispanic or Latino of any race were 2.68% of the population.

There were 9,511 households, out of which 38.9% had children under the age of 18 living with them, 59.2% were married couples living together, 10.9% had a female householder with no husband present, and 27.0% were non-families. 22.4% of all households were made up of individuals, and 7.9% had someone living alone who was 65 years of age or older. The average household size was 2.62 and the average family size was 3.08.

In the city the population was spread out, with 27.6% under the age of 18, 10.4% from 18 to 24, 30.2% from 25 to 44, 21.5% from 45 to 64, and 10.4% who were 65 years of age or older. The median age was 34 years. For every 100 females, there were 91.9 males. For every 100 females age 18 and over, there were 89.6 males.

The median income for a household in the city was $52,745, and the median income for a family was $61,273. Males had a median income of $41,713 versus $28,516 for females. The per capita income for the city was $23,415. About 3.8% of families and 5.0% of the population were below the poverty line, including 5.1% of those under age 18 and 6.1% of those age 65 or over.

== Economy ==
Major employers in Liberty include the Hallmark distribution warehouse. Liberty is also home to the operations headquarters for Ferrellgas, the 2nd largest retail provider of propane in the United States. The B&B Theatres corporate office is located in Liberty, the 5th largest theater chain in the U.S. While technically not in Liberty, the Ford Kansas City Assembly Plant is a major employer in nearby Claycomo.

=== Top employers ===
According to the town's 2016 Comprehensive Annual Financial Report, the top employers in the city are:

#	Employer	# of Employees
1	Liberty Public Schools	2,109
2	Liberty Hospital	1,400
3	Hallmark Cards	820
4	RR Donnelley	350
5	Clay County	350
6	City of Liberty	325
7	Ferrellgas	263
8	Ford Stamping Plant	256
9	William Jewell	235
10	LMV	185

== Education ==
The Liberty 53 School District, which covers almost all of the municipality, operates ten elementary, four middle and two senior high schools.

Metropolitan Community College has the Liberty school district in its taxation area.

Liberty has a public library, a branch of the Mid-Continent Public Library.

Liberty is also home to William Jewell College, a private, four-year liberal arts college of more than 900 undergraduate students that was founded in 1849.

== Notable people ==
- David Allen, former American football running back for the Jacksonville Jaguars and St. Louis Rams
- David Rice Atchison - United States Senator (D) President Pro-tem March 4–5, 1849
- Ken Boyer, former third baseman and manager of the St. Louis Cardinals
- Greg Canuteson, former mayor and state representative
- James Dewees, keyboardist and back-up vocalist of The Get Up Kids, and started Reggie and the Full Effect
- Alexander William Doniphan, Mexican War general Missouri State Rep. 1836, 1840, 1854.
- John Dougherty - United States House of Representatives 1899–1905
- Hubert Eaton, visionary and developer of the world-famous Forest Lawn cemeteries in California
- Shea Groom, professional soccer player
- Gatewood Lincoln, 1898 Graduate of West Point Military Academy, served in the Spanish American War and in both World Wars and twice governor of American Samoa
- Hunter Mense, Coach for the Kansas City Royals
- George Rice, football player for the Houston Oilers and Chicago Bears
- Johnny Ringo - Outlaw, lived in Liberty 1856–1858.
- Nick Robinson, former Stanford University basketball player and 2024 coach at the University of Kentucky.
- Alex Saxon, actor (The Fosters, Finding Carter)
- Bill Snyder - former Kansas State University football coach. William Jewell College graduate.
- Eric Staves, actor Goat (2016 film), Empire (2015 TV series) and American Horror Story: 1984
- Craig Stevens, star of the 1950s television series Peter Gunn
- Bennett Stirtz, NBA player with the Oklahoma City Thunder
- Matt Wertz, soft rock singer/songwriter

== Cultural references ==
The Liberty Jail is now an open museum and tourist site. The Clay County Historical Society Museum features period room displays, a historic pharmacy counter, toys and dolls, model trains, tools and more.

== Twin towns ==
- Diekirch, Luxembourg

== See also ==
- List of cities in Missouri
