= American Foursquare =

Housing style

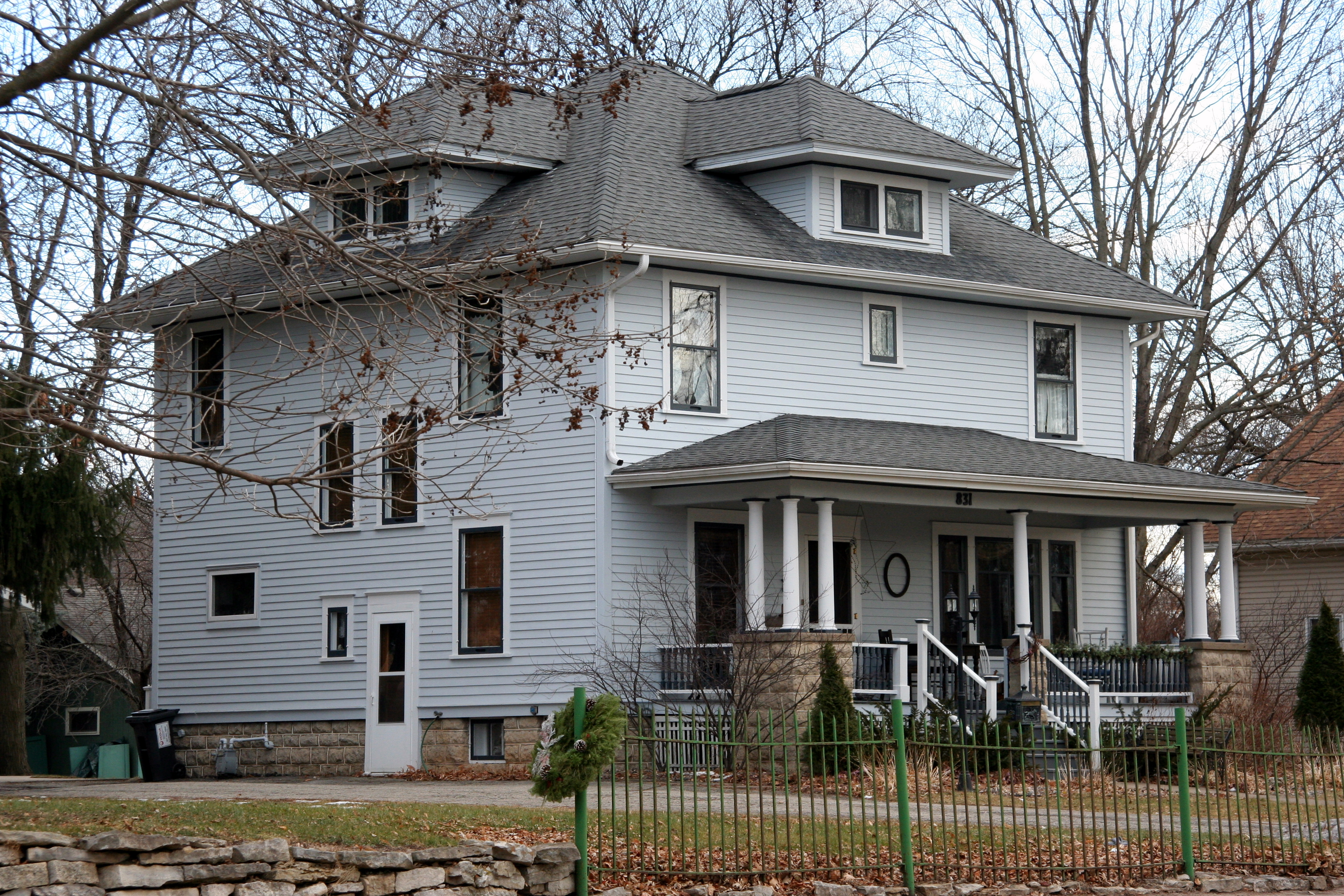
A wood-frame American Foursquare house in Minnesota with dormer windows on each side and a large front porch

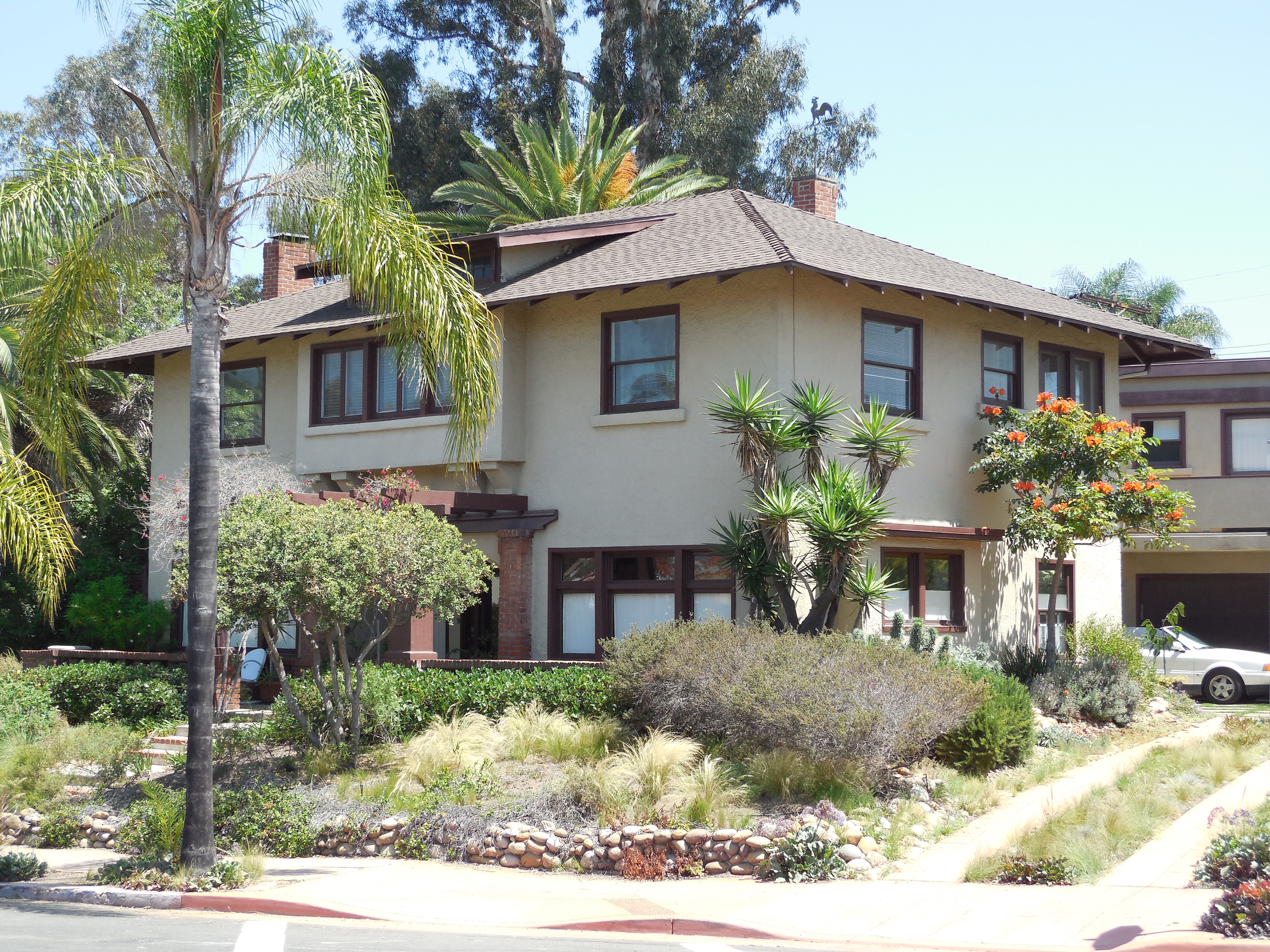
Wegeforth-Wucher house, Burlingame, San Diego

The American Foursquare (also American Four Square or American 4 Square) is a house type that became popular in the United States in the mid-1890s and remained common into the 1930s. A reaction to the ornate and mass-produced elements of the Victorian and other Revival styles popular throughout the last half of the 19th century, the American Foursquare was plain, often incorporating handcrafted "honest" woodwork (unless purchased from a mail-order catalog). This architectural vernacular incorporates elements of the Prairie School, Craftsman, Colonial Revival and other styles. It is also sometimes called Transitional Period.

The hallmarks of the vernacular include a basically square, boxy design, two-and-one-half stories high, usually with four large, boxy rooms to a floor (with the exception of the attic floor, which typically has only one or two rooms), a center dormer, and a large front porch with wide stairs. The boxy shape provides a maximum amount of interior room space, to use a small city lot to best advantage. Other common features included a hipped roof, arched entries between common rooms, built-in cabinetry, and Craftsman-style woodwork.

A typical design would be as follows: first floor, from front to back, on one side, the living room and dining room; while on the other side, the entry room or foyer, stairway and kitchen. Sometimes a bathroom was also included. Second floor, front to back, on one side, bedroom, bathroom and bedroom; while on the other side, bedroom, stairway and bedroom. The upstairs bathroom would generally be placed above the kitchen, so that the plumbing could run directly from one to the other. The bedrooms had a slightly longer dimension along the front and back of the house with side-by-side closets between the bedrooms. This gave a very efficient layout, with a bedroom in each corner and a centralized bathroom and stairway. The top floor was generally just a big open space with one to four dormers, essentially an attic, whether finished into living space or not. The basement generally contained a large natural convection furnace or boiler, exhausting to a chimney running upwards through the center of the house, which also provided exhaust for the stove.

== Models ==
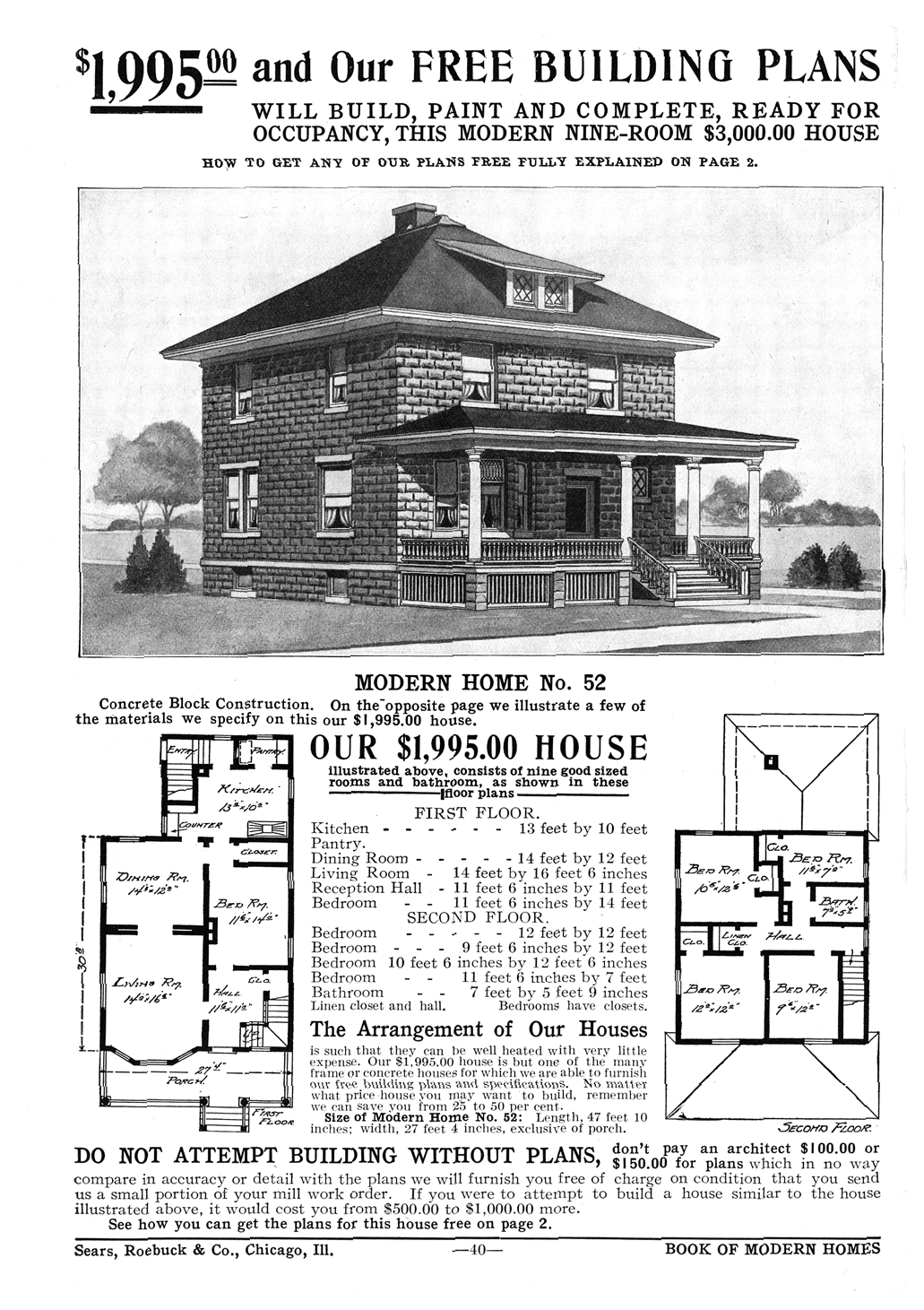
An advertisement for a Sears Roebuck foursquare house

Foursquare houses may be built with a variety of materials, including bricks and wood frames. Later models include built-in shelves and other amenities. Large tracts of these homes exist in older Midwestern urban neighborhoods, particularly streetcar suburbs, but the design was used everywhere.

As with other styles in streetcar suburbs, it was tailored to relatively narrow lots, and was multi-story, allowing more square footage on a smaller footprint. The American Foursquare style is occasionally revived in new developments, although its appeal is as a "traditional-looking" style rather than a fully authentic one, often including modern two-car attached garages and other features absent in originals, and typically built on larger lots.

== History ==
The American Foursquare or "Prairie Box" was a post-Victorian style, which shared many features with the Prairie architecture pioneered by Frank Lloyd Wright.

During the early 1900s and 1910s, Wright even designed his own variations on the Foursquare, including the Robert M. Lamp House, "A Fireproof House for $5000", and several two-story models for American System-Built Homes. Unlike other houses of the style, Wright's versions featured more open main floor plans achieved by removing or minimizing partitions between the entry, living room, and dining room. He in turn inspired other Prairie School architects, such as Walter Burley Griffin, to design similar Foursquares in the following decades.

Other variations on the American Foursquare emerged regionally during the first decades of the 20th century. In Kansas City, the Shirtwaist-style emerged, with a brick or limestone first floor and siding-wrapped second and third floors. The style is named for the higher-waisted women's fashion of the time.

Later Foursquares often had the same type of interiors as bungalows, with open floor plans, many built-ins, and fireplaces. Many examples are trimmed with tiled roofs, cornice-line brackets, or other details drawn from Craftsman, Italian Renaissance, or Mission architecture.

== Mail-order era ==
The Foursquare was a popular mail-order era style along with the California bungalow. When one was ordered, it came in a boxcar with a book of directions and all the parts pre-cut and numbered for self-assembly. These homes are particularly common in neighborhoods near rail-lines built in this era. The largest mail-order house catalog companies were Sears and Aladdin.

== See also ==
- List of house types
- List of house styles
