= Miller Building (Davenport, Iowa) =

- U.S. National Register of Historic Places
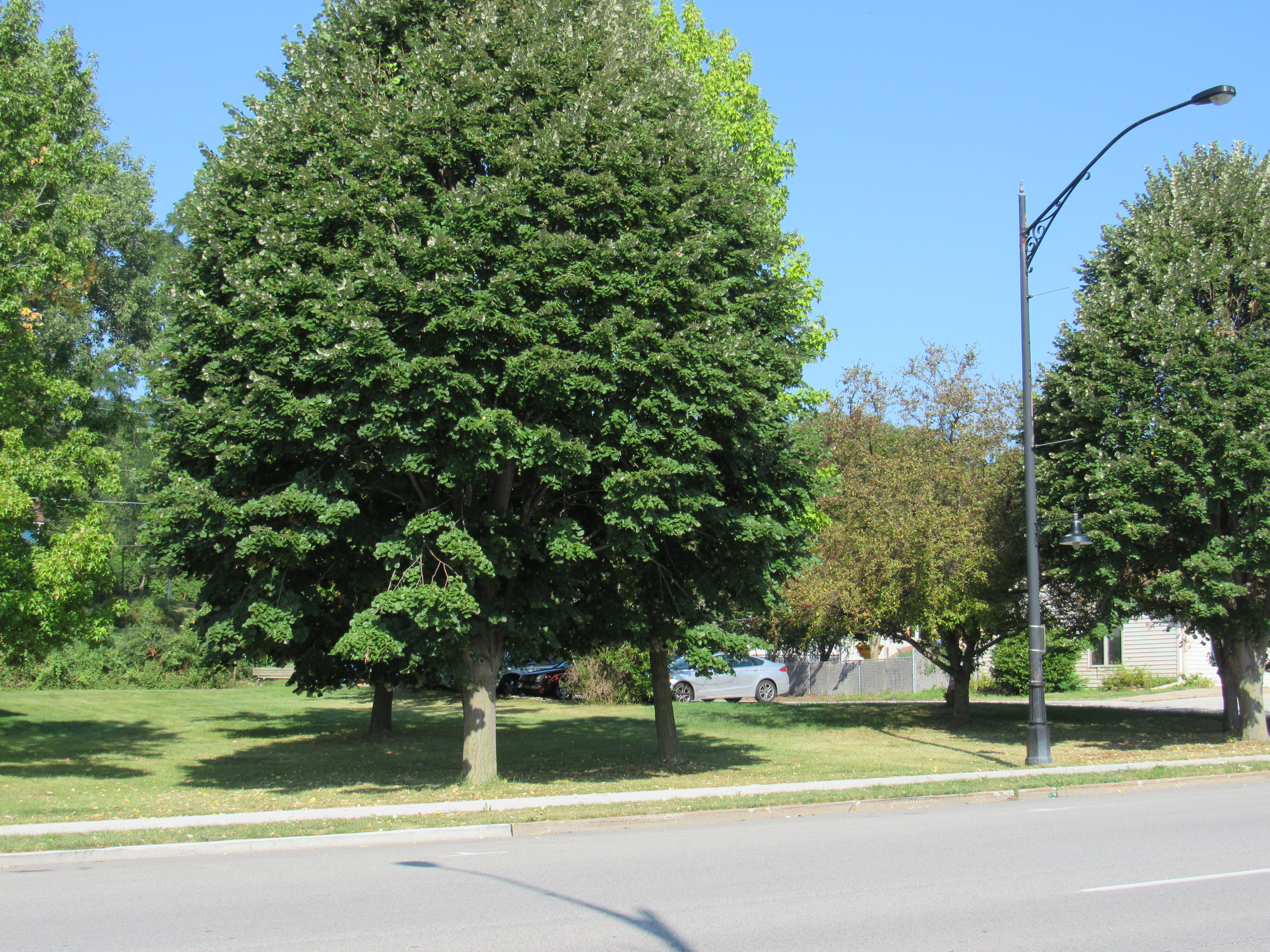
- The building was located near this grove of trees.

- Location within Iowa Location within the United States
- Location: 724 Harrison St. Davenport, Iowa
- Coordinates: 41°31′38″N 90°34′38″W
- Area: less than one acre
- Architectural style: Late Victorian
- MPS: Davenport MRA
- NRHP reference No.: 83002471
- Added to NRHP: July 7, 1983

The Miller Building was a historic building located in the central part of Davenport, Iowa, United States. It was listed on the National Register of Historic Places in 1983.

== History ==
Dr. William Miller built this structure around 1885. He used the first floor for his medical practice and lived in the residential space on the second floor. Other commercial interests also occupied the building over the years. The building was a part of a larger commercial strip on Harrison Street that was torn down in 1985 and subsequently replaced by a modern facility housing a daycare center.

== Architecture ==
The Miller Building was a two-story brick building. The Late Victorian style structure exemplified the variety of brickwork that was found in Davenport's commercial architecture. It featured a three-bay façade, cast iron shop front, keystone depressed round-arch windows, and a corbelled cornice. An addition had been built onto the back.
