= Shirtwaist (architecture) =

Variation of the American Four Square architectural style

A Shirtwaist house is a variation of the American Four Square architectural style, predominantly built at the beginning of the 20th century. It is characterized by a first floor of exposed brick or limestone and siding-wrapped second and third floors. The style developed and is most commonly found in Kansas City. It is named for the higher-waisted women's fashion popular during that period.
