= Chris Cissell =

American soccer coach (born 1972)

Personal information
- Date of birth: May 6, 1972 (age 54)
- Place of birth: Dallas, Texas, United States
- Position: Midfielder

Youth career
- Parkway West High School

College career
| Years | Team | Apps | (Gls) |
- William Jewell College

Managerial career
- 1999–2010: William Jewell College (women)
- 2002–2010: William Jewell College (men)
- 2007: KC Wizards Juniors-Director
- 2008: Missouri 97 ODP-boys
- 2011–2019: Kansas City Roos (women)
- 2020–: Grand Canyon Antelopes (women)

Chris Cissell is an American soccer coach born May 6, 1972, in Dallas, Texas, United States. He is the current Head Coach of the women's soccer team at Grand Canyon University.

In 2003 Cissell guided the WJC women's soccer team to the NAIA National Final Four (his fifth year as the WJC women's head coach). In 2006 Cissell guided the WJC men's soccer team to the NAIA National Final Four (his fifth year as the WJC men's head coach). In 2006 Cissell was named NSCAA/adidas NAIA men's soccer National Coach of the Year. In 2010 Cissell guided the William Jewell College women's team to the National Elite Eight and the William Jewell College men's team to the National Final Four.

== Early soccer experiences ==
Chris Cissell has been involved in competitive soccer since age 8 and involved as a coach in the Kansas City club soccer scene since his sophomore year of college (1991). Although born in Dallas, Texas; Cissell grew up in St. Louis, Missouri and played club soccer for the legendary Pat McBride. At Parkway West high school, Cissell was co-captain with Brian Kamler, who played in MLS for 10 seasons. He also played against former Kansas City Wizards midfielders Matt McKeon, Mike Sorber and current MLS and U.S. National Team star winger Steve Ralston.

== Coaching college soccer ==
Cissell started coaching the William Jewell College women's program in 1999 and the men's program in 2002. In the following years, he led the women's program to four women's NAIA National Tournament appearances (2003, 2004, 2005, 2007) and the men's program to two men's NAIA National Tournament appearance (2004 & 2006). In addition, Cissell is the only coach in NAIA history to lead both a women's team (2003) and men's team (2006) to an NAIA National Tournament Final Four appearance. Since Cissell's arrival, William Jewell College soccer programs routinely place in the NSCAA National Rankings and regularly produce All Americans and nationally recognized scholar athletes.

A standout player at William Jewell College (1990–94), Cissell has also become a well-recognized coach earning the Heart of America Conference Women's Coach of the Year honor four times (2000, 2001, 2003, 2005) as well as NAIA Region V Women's Coach of the Year award in 2003 as well as NSCAA/adidas Midwest Coach of the Year in 2003. In addition, Coach Cissell earned the Heart of America Conference Men's Coach of the Year honor in 2003, 2006 & 2010 and was the recipient of the NAIA Region V Men's Coach of the Year honor in 2006 and the NSCAA/adidas Central Region Coach of the Year in 2006. At the 2006 National Soccer Coaches Association of America convention in Indianapolis, Indiana; Coach Cissell was honored as the 2006 NSCAA/adidas NAIA Men's National Coach of the Year. Coach Chris Cissell has a combined 279-92-21 record. He is 165-43-11 with the William Jewell College Women's soccer program and 114-49-10 with the William Jewell College Men's soccer program. Chris now lives in Liberty Missouri. He is Married and has four children one of which played on one of the best 14U national teams in America.

== Honors ==
- Heart of America Athletic Conference Men's Coach of the Year-William Jewell College (2010)
- NSCAA Team Ethics Award-William Jewell College women's soccer (2010)
- Champions-Heart of America Athletic Conference-William Jewell College men's soccer (2010)
- NSCAA/adidas Team Academic Award-William Jewell College men's soccer (2010)
- NSCAA/adidas Team Academic Award-William Jewell College women's soccer (2010)
- NSCAA/adidas Team Academic Award-William Jewell College men's soccer (2009)
- NSCAA/adidas Team Academic Award-William Jewell College women's soccer (2009)
- NSCAA/adidas Team Academic Award-William Jewell College men's soccer (2008)
- NSCAA/adidas Team Academic Award-William Jewell College women's soccer (2008)
- NSCAA Team Ethics Award-William Jewell College women's soccer (2008)
- NSCAA/adidas Team Academic Award-William Jewell College men's soccer (2007)
- NSCAA/adidas Team Academic Award-William Jewell College women's soccer (2007)
- MLS SUM U17 Cup Finalist in Denver, Colorado-Kansas City Wizards Juniors (2007)
- NAIA National Tournament qualifiers-William Jewell College women's soccer (2007)
- NAIA Regional Tournament qualifiers-William Jewell College women's soccer (2007)
- NAIA National Tournament Final Four-William Jewell College men's soccer (2006)
- NAIA National Tournament qualifiers-William Jewell College men's soccer (2006)
- Champions-NAIA Region V Tournament-William Jewell College men's soccer (2006)
- NAIA Regional Tournament qualifiers-William Jewell College men's soccer (2006)
- NAIA Regional Tournament qualifiers-William Jewell College women's soccer (2006)
- Champions-Heart of America Athletic Conference-William Jewell College men's soccer (2006)
- NSCAA/adidas NAIA Men's National Coach of the Year (2006)
- NSCAA/adidas NAIA Men's Central Region Coach of the Year-William Jewell College (2006)
- Heart of America Athletic Conference Men's Coach of the Year-William Jewell College (2006)
- Heart of America Athletic Conference Women's Coach of the Year-William Jewell College (2005)
- NSCAA/adidas NAIA Women's Midwest Region Coach of the Year (2003)
- Heart of America Athletic Conference Men's Coach of the Year-William Jewell College (2003)
- NAIA National Tournament Final Four-William Jewell College women's soccer (2003)
- Heart of America Athletic Conference Women's Coach of the Year-William Jewell College (2003)
- Heart of America Athletic Conference Women's Coach of the Year-William Jewell College (2001)
- Heart of America Conference Women's Coach of the Year-William Jewell College (2000)

== Soccer Administrator and Leader ==
- Chris Cissell served as the Wizards Juniors Youth Director when the Kansas City Wizards (MLS) launched their youth teams in the summer of 2007. Cissell also assisted the 90/91 KC Wizards Juniors during their SUM U17 Cup in Denver, Colorado in 2007.
- Chris Cissell is a member of various coaching associations including the National Soccer Coaches Association of America (NSCAA), United States Soccer Coaches Organization and the United States Youth Soccer Coaches Connection.
- Chris Cissell has served as the chairman of the NAIA Region V Men's Soccer Committee and is currently the chairman of the NAIA Region V Women's Soccer Committee.
- Chris Cissell has a USSF National Coaching License.
- Chris Cissell conducted a demonstration for coaches during Denis Irwin's visit to Kansas City promoting Manchester United's July 25, 2010 exhibition versus the Kansas City Wizards.
