= Howard Cissell =

American gridiron football player (born 1936)

Profile
- Position: Halfback

Personal information
- Born: August 21, 1936; West Memphis, Arkansas, U.S.
- Died: February 19, 2019 (aged 82); Snellville, Georgia, U.S.
- Listed height: 6 ft 1 in (1.85 m)
- Listed weight: 205 lb (93 kg)

Career information
- College: Arkansas State

Career history
- 1960–1962: Montreal Alouettes

Howard Cissell
Coaching career (HC unless noted)
- 1973-1978: North Texas State (Assistant)
- 1979–1980: Iowa (DE)

Howard Cissell (August 21, 1936 - February 19, 2019) is an American former professional football player who played for the Montreal Alouettes from 1960 to 1962 and was an assistant college football coach.

He played college football at Arkansas State University. He led his team in receiving for two seasons (10 catches for 129 yards and a touchdown in 1955 and 10 catches for 138 yards and two touchdowns in 1957), and led in scoring his senior year with 36 points and 6 touchdowns. He also lettered four years as a hurdler on the track team.

He signed with the Baltimore Colts after college, but was released and played professionally in the CFL for three seasons with the Montreal Alouettes.

He coached ten years in high school in Arkansas, and was an assistant coach under Hayden Fry for six seasons at North Texas State, and two seasons at Iowa.

In 1993, he was selected to the Arkansas State Athletic Hall of Fame.
