= Miller Building (Liberty, Missouri) =

- U.S. National Register of Historic Places
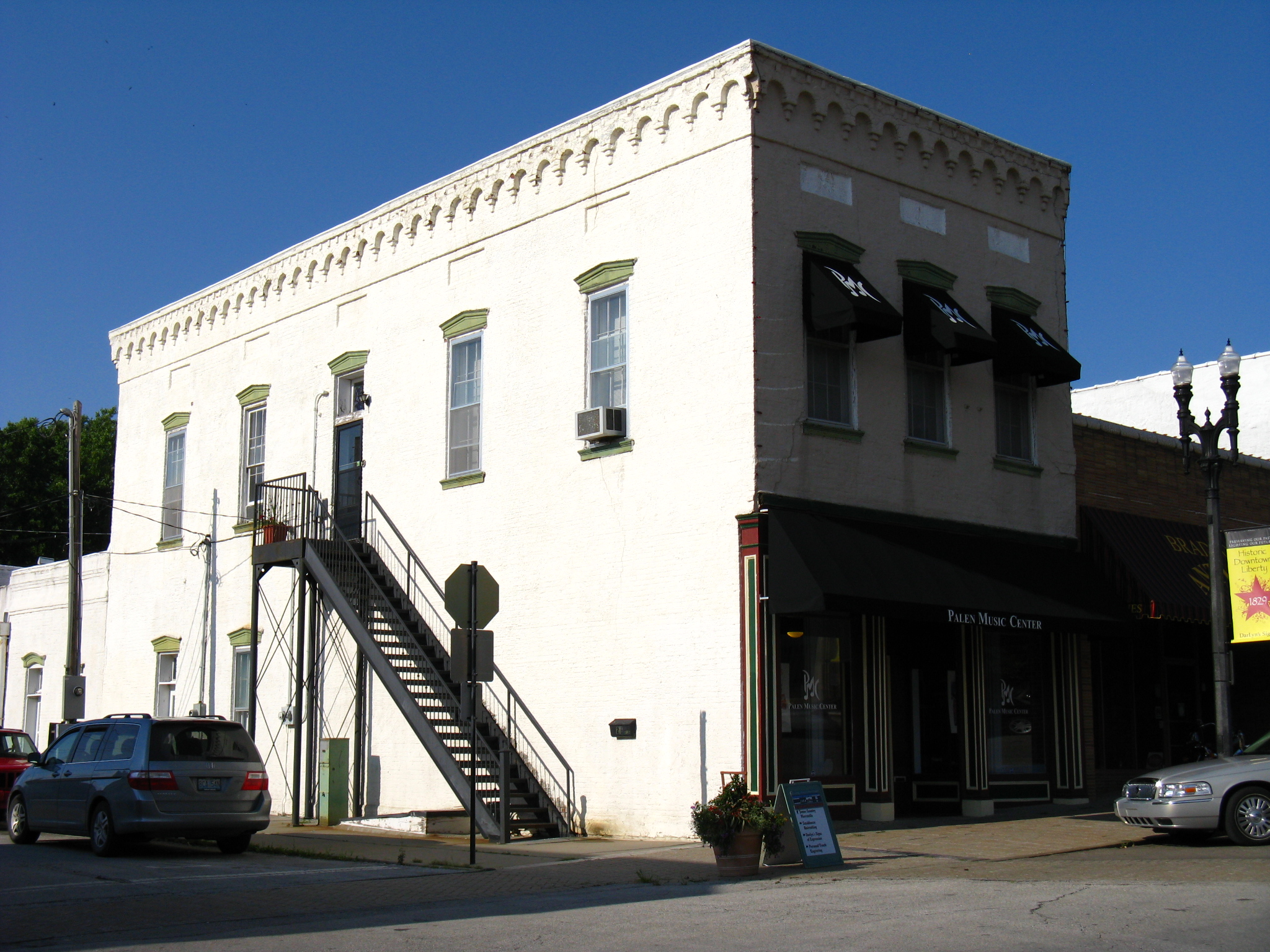
- Miller Building, June 2008

- Location within Missouri Location within the United States
- Location: 2 E. Franklin St., Liberty, Missouri
- Coordinates: 39°14′50″N 94°25′12″W
- Area: less than one acre
- Built: 1868
- Architectural style: Late Victorian, Early Commercial Block
- MPS: Liberty MPS
- NRHP reference No.: 92001679
- Added to NRHP: December 28, 1992

Miller Building is a historic commercial building located at Liberty, Clay County, Missouri. It was built in 1868, and is a two-story, rectangular brick building with Late Victorian style design elements. It has a flat roof and features a decorative brick cornice, hooded window surrounds, and an intact storefront with cast-iron columns.

It was listed on the National Register of Historic Places in 1992.
