= Cockrell =

Surname disambiguation

Cockrell is a surname. Notable people with the surname include:

- Alan Cockrell, American major league baseball player
- Alvin C. Cockrell, American serviceman in World War II; Navy Cross winner
- Amanda Cockrell, Hollins University professor
- Anna Cockrell, American track and field athlete
- Byron Lavoy Cockrell, American engineer
- Bud Cockrell, American musician and band member
- Chris Cockrell, bass player with Kyuss
- Francis Cockrell, U.S. senator from Missouri and Confederate general
- Gene Cockrell (1934–2020), American football player
- Jeremiah V. Cockrell, U.S. congressman from Texas and Confederate officer
- Kenneth Cockrell, American astronaut
- Lila Cockrell, former mayor of San Antonio, Texas
- Nathan Elams Cockrell, fraternity founder
- Phil Cockrell, Negro league baseball player
- Thad Cockrell, American musician
- Simon Cockrell (1745–1835), American Baptist minister and politician from Virginia

== See also ==
- Cockrell, Missouri, an unincorporated community
- Cockrell Hill, Texas, a city in Texas
- USS Alvin C. Cockrell (DE-366), American naval vessel
- Cockrell School of Engineering, college of The University of Texas at Austin
