= Sni-A-Bar Township, Jackson County, Missouri =

Inactive township in Missouri

Coordinates: 39°01′58″N 94°13′05″W

Sni-A-Bar Township (/ˈsnaɪ.ə.bɑːr/ SNY-ə-bar) is an inactive township in Jackson County, in the U.S. state of Missouri. It was annexed into the city of Kansas City, Missouri and is within the Kansas City metropolitan area.

== History ==
It was established in 1834, named after Sni-A-Bar Creek. The township included Blue Springs, Oak Grove, and the village of Grain Valley.

It reportedly became William Quantrill's "principal rendezvous mainly because this area provided many bushwhackers and Confederate sympathizers".

From 1913-1945, it was the site of a large demonstration farm called Sni-A-Bar Farms, the legacy of Kansas City newspaper mogul William Rockhill Nelson. It sustained the community through the Great Depression.
