= Blue Mill =

Blue Mill or Blue Mills may refer to:

== Geography ==
- Blues Mills, Nova Scotia, a community in Canada
- Blue Mills, Missouri, a community in the United States
- Blue Mill Stream, a river in Delaware County, New York, United States

== Architecture ==
- Blue Mill, East Garton, a windmill in the East Riding of Yorkshire, England

== History ==
- Action at Blue Mills Landing, battle of the American Civil War
