= Sni-A-Bar =

Sni-A-Bar may refer to the following places in the U.S. state of Missouri:

- Sni-A-Bar Creek
- Sni-A-Bar Township, Jackson County, Missouri
- Sni-A-Bar Township, Lafayette County, Missouri
