= Tarsney Lakes, Missouri =

- Census-designated place
- Location within Missouri Location within the United States
- Coordinates: 38°56′59″N 94°12′15″W
- Country: United States
- State: Missouri
- County: Jackson
- Township: Van Buren

Area
  - Total: 0.36 sq mi (0.92 km^{2})
  - Land: 0.31 sq mi (0.79 km^{2})
  - Water: 0.050 sq mi (0.13 km^{2})
- Elevation: 939 ft (286 m)

Population (2020)
  - Total: 250
  - Density: 817.6/sq mi (315.67/km^{2})
- Time zone: UTC-6 (Central (CST))
  - Summer (DST): UTC-5 (CDT)
- ZIP Code: 64075 (Oak Grove)
- Area code: 816
- FIPS code: 29-72412
- GNIS feature ID: 2806404

Tarsney Lakes is an unincorporated community and census-designated place (CDP) in Jackson County, Missouri, United States. It is in the eastern part of the county, northeast of the unincorporated community of Tarsney, and consisting of residential neighborhoods surrounding Tarsney Lake and Wood Lake, just south of the West Fork of Sni-A-Bar Creek. It is 28 miles (45 km) southeast of downtown Kansas City.

As of the 2020 census, Tarsney Lakes had a population of 250.

Tarsney Lakes was first listed as a CDP prior to the 2020 census.

== Demographics ==
Historical population
Census	Pop.	Note	%±
2020	250		—
U.S. Decennial Census

Tarsney Lakes first appeared as a census designated place in the 2020 U.S. census.

Tarsney Lakes CDP, Missouri – Racial and ethnic composition Note: the US Census treats Hispanic/Latino as an ethnic category. This table excludes Latinos from the racial categories and assigns them to a separate category. Hispanics/Latinos may be of any race.
Race / Ethnicity (NH = Non-Hispanic)	Pop 2020	2020
White alone (NH)	216	86.40%
Black or African American alone (NH)	2	0.80%
Native American or Alaska Native alone (NH)	1	0.40%
Asian alone (NH)	0	0.00%
Native Hawaiian or Pacific Islander alone (NH)	1	0.40%
Other race alone (NH)	0	0.00%
Mixed race or Multiracial (NH)	24	9.60%
Hispanic or Latino (any race)	6	2.40%
Total	250	100.00%

== Education ==
The majority of Tarsney Lakes is in the Lee's Summit R-VII School District. A small piece is in the Grain Valley R-V School District.

Metropolitan Community College has the Lee's Summit and Grain Valley school districts in its taxation area.
