= Lotawana =

- Directed by: Trevor Hawkins
- Written by: Trevor Hawkins
- Starring: Jennifer Seward; Todd Blubaugh; Anita Cordell
- Release date: 2022
- Running time: 97 minutes
- Country: United States
- Language: English

Lotawana is a 2022 American adventure drama film written and directed by Trevor Hawkins and starring Jennifer Seward, Todd Blubaugh and Anita Cordell.

== Cast ==
- Jennifer Seward as Main Nurse
- Todd Blubaugh as Forrest
- Anita Cordell as Store Clerk

== Production ==
It was filmed around Lake Lotawana, Missouri. Production on the film took over seven years, during which time the lead actress was recast twice.

== Reception ==
Bradley Gibson of Film Threat rated the film an 8 out of 10. Evan Dossey of Midwest Film Journal praised the film "as an opportunity for Hawkins to film his handsome performers and the beautiful scenery around them" but criticized its story and the characters' lack of depth.
