= Van Buren Township, Jackson County, Missouri =

Inactive township in the US state of Missouri

Coordinates: 38°53′49″N 94°11′28″W

Van Buren Township is an inactive township in Jackson County, in the U.S. state of Missouri.

Van Buren Township was established in 1837, taking its name from President Martin Van Buren.

The township included some of the least densely populated areas of Jackson county, including villages of Lone Jack, Cockrell, Hicks City, Sni Mills, and Tarsney Lakes. An atlas showing the townships of Jackson County in 1930 is on page 2 of:

- (Jackson County, circa 1930): http://cdm.sos.mo.gov/cdm/ref/collection/moplatbooks/id/1537
