= Lake Lotawana, Missouri =

- City
- Location of Lake Lotawana, Missouri
- Coordinates: 38°55′36″N 94°15′12″W
- Country: United States
- State: Missouri
- County: Jackson
- Incorporated: 1958

Government
  - Type: Board of Alderman
  - Mayor: Tracy Rasmussen
  - City Administrator: Nick Shigouri
  - City Clerk: Lauran Kurtz

Area
  - Total: 11.30 sq mi (29.26 km^{2})
  - Land: 10.31 sq mi (26.71 km^{2})
  - Water: 0.98 sq mi (2.55 km^{2})
- Elevation: 896 ft (273 m)

Population (2020)
  - Total: 2,310
  - Density: 224.0/sq mi (86.47/km^{2})
- Time zone: UTC-6 (Central (CST))
  - Summer (DST): UTC-5 (CDT)
- ZIP codes: 64064, 64086, 64029, 64070
- Area code: 816
- FIPS code: 29-39980
- GNIS feature ID: 0720753
- Website: www.lakelotawana.org

Lake Lotawana is a city in Jackson County, Missouri, United States and is located 35 miles southeast of downtown Kansas City bordering Blue Springs and Lee’s Summit. The population was 2,310 as of the 2020 census. It is part of the Kansas City metropolitan area.

The city derives its name from the lake that takes up most of the city, which is said to be named after an Indian princess.

== History ==
Lake Lotawana was conceived, purchased, built and developed by Milton Thompson, owner of nearby Highland Farms, the world's largest Hereford cattle breeding farm at that time (1927). He had previously developed nearby Lake Tapawingo, a lake community with retreats for wealthy Kansas City businessmen. Permission for the new lake was requested November 7, 1927 and surveying was completed June 13, 1928. The dam was completed in the fall of 1929 just before the stock market crash that ushered in the Great Depression. An extended drought meant the lake did not fill completely until the Spring of 1935. Early land sales were slow due to the Depression.

Lake Lotawana was named after a fabled Native American princess whose name meant "sparkling water". The legend of Princess Lotawana tells of her life in the Catskill Mountains of New York. In her legend, she was murdered on her wedding day by a jealous spurned suitor.

The area of Sni-A-Bar creek that later became Lake Lotawana was used as a hideout and staging area by Quantrill's Raiders during the Civil War. This band of irregulars conducted raids against Union Army units and pro-Union and Abolitionist residents of Missouri and Kansas. There are accounts that they engaged in the Battle of Quantrill's Cove on August 13, 1862, where they defeated a Union Cavalry force under Major Emory L. Foster. Accounts of the incident are not clear, but this engagement was a spillover from the Battle of Lone Jack. This battle was supposed to have taken place near present-day Quantrill's Cove, near the west end of the lake. Quantrill's group also staged the famous and better known raid against Lawrence, Kansas, known as the Lawrence massacre on August 21, 1863. The brutality of the raid resulted in the Order No. 11 by Union Brigadier General Thomas C. Ewing, garrisoned in present-day Kansas City. This order resulted in the forced relocation of all Confederate sympathizers in four counties, including the area of present-day Lake Lotawana. It was meant to clear the counties of a civilian support structure, and resulted in much property loss by the residents of the area. Most homes were burnt to the ground and people had to leave with little more than the clothes on their backs and what they could load into a wagon. The band of Quantrill's Raiders continued their efforts to harass the Union forces after the order was implemented. There were rumors that stolen property from the raid on Lawrence was buried by Quantrill's men in or near the Sni-a-Bar creek valley that later became Lake Lotawana. Treasure Cove in the C Block of the lake was named in reference to the buried treasure.

After the Civil War, settlers returned to the area, mostly developing the surrounding area as farms. Sni-A-Bar creek remained a heavily timbered valley, not as suitable for crops or livestock. There was a sulphur spring in block T inside Gate 3 that was a site of picnics and revivals. Most famously, the Baptist Minister Joab Powell of the Union Church (near the modern day intersection of 7 and 50 highways) would hold revivals in what is now called Waterfall Cove. The church was destroyed by a tornado in 1894.

Milton Thompson purchased much of the land, employing Oliver Sheley to survey the lake. Originally, the lake had locked gates, with guards stationed to check for passes. Many of the original homes were cabins, made of logs, meant for summer vacation dwellings only. A mixture of summer cabins and permanent dwellings were built through the 1930s. The dam required many repairs and upgrades through the 1930s and 1940s, including the first WPA project in Jackson County, Missouri.

Early organization of the area was managed by the Lake Lotawana Development Company.[7] The city was incorporated into a fourth class city on November 24, 1958.

== Geography ==
Lake Lotawana is located at 38°55′36″N 94°15′12″W (38.926627, −94.253201).

According to the United States Census Bureau, the City has a total area of 11.29 square miles (29.24 km^{2}), of which 10.31 square miles (26.70 km^{2}) is land and 0.98 square miles (2.54 km^{2}) is water.

According to the Lake Lotawana website the lake has 600 acres of surface water and 27 miles of shoreline.

The City originally had approximately 2.3 square miles of area. Two annexations in 2001 and 2004, respectively, expanded the City's boundary south beyond U.S. Highway 50. This included the 2200 acre Barber property, and the Foxberry and Oak Haven subdivisions. The City presently encompasses roughly 11.3 square miles.

== Government ==
The City of Lake Lotawana government is operated by an elected Mayor, and elected Board of Aldermen, with a paid City Administrator position to carry out the goals and objectives set by the elected municipal government body. The Mayor, Aldermen, and City Collector are elected for 2 year terms. The 6 Aldermen are elected 3 at a time in staggered terms. The Mayor presides over the Board of Aldermen, but does not vote on resolutions or ordinances unless it is a tie vote. The lake and common areas themselves are owned by the non-profit Lake Lotawana Association.

Law Enforcement:

The City of Lake Lotawana has its own Municipal Police Department that serves the city for law enforcement needs. The police department is operated 24 hours a day, 7 days a week.

Fire and EMS:

The City of Lake Lotawana is mostly served by the Southern Jackson County Fire Protection District, but some residents south of 50 Hwy, east of 7 Hwy, are served by the Lone Jack Fire Protection District. The Southern Jackson County Fire Protection District has three fire stations that are staffed 24 hours a day. The Lone Jack Fire Protection District has one fire station located in Lone Jack, Mo and sometimes is not staffed 24 hours a day by paid fire staff.

== Education ==
Residents are within the Lee's Summit R7 School District, and students attend Mason Elementary, Bernard C. Campbell Middle School, and Lee's Summit North High School.

Metropolitan Community College has the Lee's Summit school district in its taxation area.

== Government and infrastructure ==
Water is supplied by Public Water Supply Districts 13 and 15. The City of Lake Lotawana provides sewer service. Spire provides natural gas service. Evergy provides electrical service.

A Comprehensive Plan was completed in 2017 and is available on the City's website.

== Demographics ==
Historical population
Census	Pop.	Note	%±
1960	1,499		—
1970	1,786		19.1%
1980	1,875		5.0%
1990	2,141		14.2%
2000	1,872		−12.6%
2010	1,939		3.6%
2020	2,310		19.1%
U.S. Decennial Census

=== Racial and ethnic composition ===
Lake Lotawana city, Missouri – Racial and ethnic composition Note: the US Census treats Hispanic/Latino as an ethnic category. This table excludes Latinos from the racial categories and assigns them to a separate category. Hispanics/Latinos may be of any race.
Race / Ethnicity (NH = Non-Hispanic)	Pop 2000	Pop 2010	Pop 2020	% 2000	% 2010	% 2020
White alone (NH)	1,810	1,857	2,083	96.69%	95.77%	90.17%
Black or African American alone (NH)	4	8	30	0.21%	0.41%	1.30%
Native American or Alaska Native alone (NH)	11	5	4	0.59%	0.26%	0.17%
Asian alone (NH)	3	10	17	0.16%	0.52%	0.74%
Native Hawaiian or Pacific Islander alone (NH)	1	1	4	0.05%	0.05%	0.17%
Other race alone (NH)	0	0	13	0.00%	0.00%	0.56%
Mixed race or Multiracial (NH)	18	24	95	0.96%	1.24%	4.11%
Hispanic or Latino (any race)	25	34	64	1.34%	1.75%	2.77%
Total	1,872	1,939	2,310	100.00%	100.00%	100.00%

=== 2020 census ===
As of the 2020 census, Lake Lotawana had a population of 2,310. The median age was 47.8 years. 18.9% of residents were under the age of 18 and 19.1% of residents were 65 years of age or older. For every 100 females there were 103.3 males, and for every 100 females age 18 and over there were 102.0 males age 18 and over.

73.7% of residents lived in urban areas, while 26.3% lived in rural areas.

There were 939 households in Lake Lotawana, of which 28.8% had children under the age of 18 living in them. Of all households, 65.4% were married-couple households, 14.4% were households with a male householder and no spouse or partner present, and 13.5% were households with a female householder and no spouse or partner present. About 19.0% of all households were made up of individuals and 8.5% had someone living alone who was 65 years of age or older.

There were 1,335 housing units, of which 29.7% were vacant. The homeowner vacancy rate was 2.0% and the rental vacancy rate was 2.7%.

Racial composition as of the 2020 census
Race	Number	Percent
White	2,109	91.3%
Black or African American	31	1.3%
American Indian and Alaska Native	5	0.2%
Asian	17	0.7%
Native Hawaiian and Other Pacific Islander	4	0.2%
Some other race	26	1.1%
Two or more races	118	5.1%

=== 2010 census ===
As of the census of 2010, there were 1,939 people, 840 households, and 566 families residing in the city. The population density was 188.1 inhabitants per square mile (72.6/km^{2}). There were 1,299 housing units at an average density of 126.0 per square mile (48.6/km^{2}). The racial makeup of the city was 96.8% White, 0.4% African American, 0.3% Native American, 0.5% Asian, 0.1% Pacific Islander, 0.4% from other races, and 1.6% from two or more races. Hispanic or Latino of any race were 1.8% of the population.

There were 840 households, of which 26.1% had children under the age of 18 living with them, 58.6% were married couples living together, 5.8% had a female householder with no husband present, 3.0% had a male householder with no wife present, and 32.6% were non-families. 24.5% of all households were made up of individuals, and 7.4% had someone living alone who was 65 years of age or older. The average household size was 2.31 and the average family size was 2.75.

The median age in the city was 46.7 years. 19.7% of residents were under the age of 18; 5.2% were between the ages of 18 and 24; 22.8% were from 25 to 44; 37.9% were from 45 to 64; and 14.5% were 65 years of age or older. The gender makeup of the city was 51.7% male and 48.3% female.

=== 2000 census ===
As of the census of 2000, there were 1,872 people, 815 households, and 567 families residing in the city. The population density was 1,230.3 inhabitants per square mile (475.0/km^{2}). There were 970 housing units at an average density of 637.5 per square mile (246.1/km^{2}). The racial makeup of the city was 97.86% White, 0.21% African American, 0.59% Native American, 0.16% Asian, 0.05% Pacific Islander, and 1.12% from two or more races. Hispanic or Latino of any race were 1.34% of the population.

There were 815 households, out of which 26.5% had children under the age of 18 living with them, 59.4% were married couples living together, 5.9% had a female householder with no husband present, and 30.4% were non-families. 24.3% of all households were made up of individuals, and 5.5% had someone living alone who was 65 years of age or older. The average household size was 2.30 and the average family size was 2.71.

In the city the population was spread out, with 19.6% under the age of 18, 4.8% from 18 to 24, 27.8% from 25 to 44, 34.9% from 45 to 64, and 12.9% who were 65 years of age or older. The median age was 44 years. For every 100 females, there were 103.0 males. For every 100 females age 18 and over, there were 103.8 males.

The median income for a household in the city was $65,750, and the median income for a family was $72,500. Males had a median income of $50,991 versus $35,774 for females. The per capita income for the city was $38,125. About 2.8% of families and 4.3% of the population were below the poverty line, including 9.3% of those under age 18 and 2.5% of those age 65 or over.
