= Sni Mills, Missouri =

Unincorporated community in Missouri, U.S.

Coordinates: 38°56′27″N 94°07′57″W

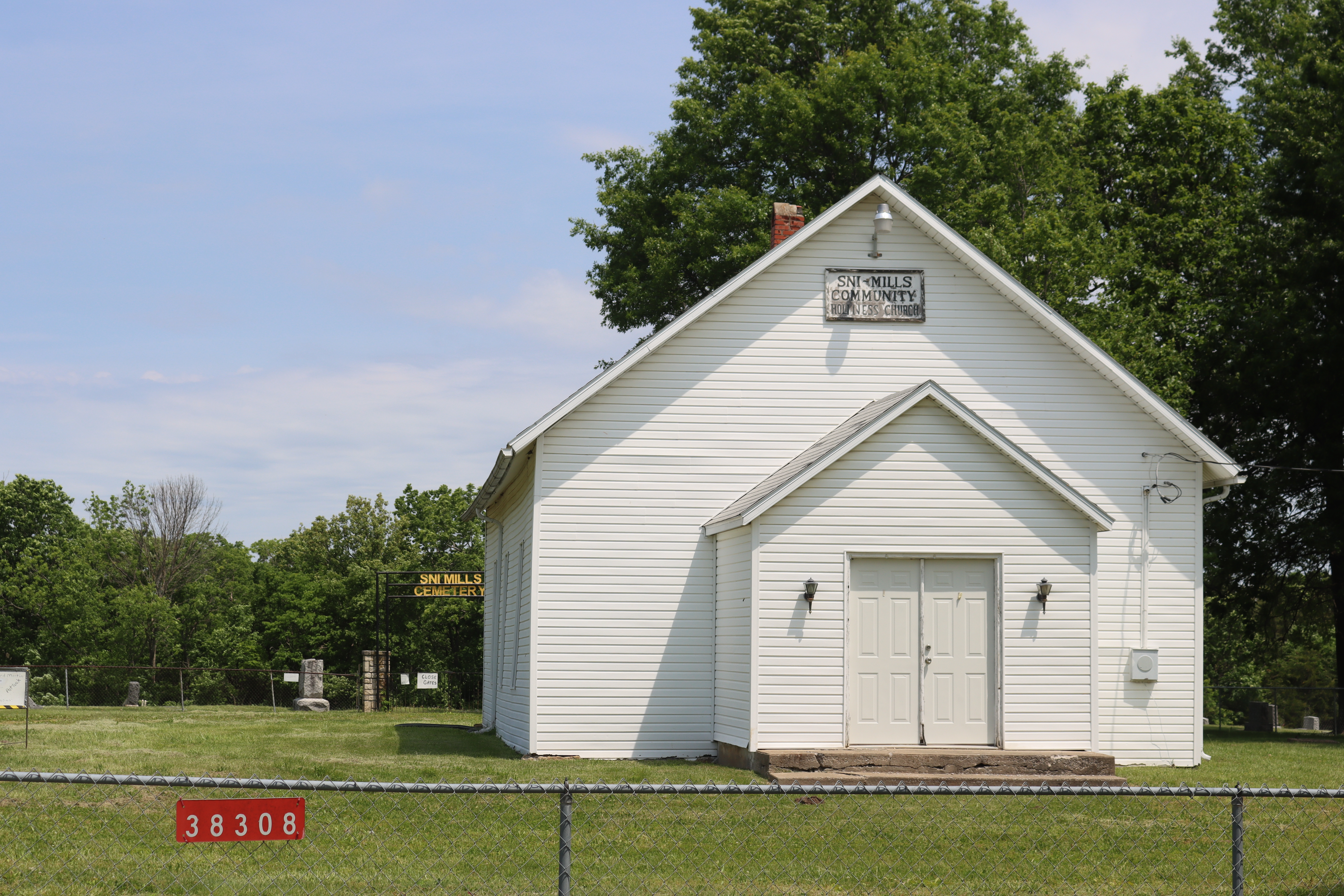
The church and cemetery

Sni Mills is an unincorporated community in Jackson County, in the U.S. state of Missouri.

== History ==
A post office was established at Sni Mills in 1871, and remained in operation until 1902. The community was named after nearby Sni-A-Bar Creek.
