= Grain Valley R-V School District =

School district in Missouri, U.S.

The Grain Valley R-V School District is a school district headquartered in Grain Valley, Missouri. The district has an enrollment of over 4000 students, up from 1659 students in 2000

The district, in Jackson County, includes Grain Valley, as well as a small portions of Blue Springs, Oak Grove, and Tarsney Lakes, and unincorporated eastern Jackson County.

== Elementary schools ==
- Matthews Elementary School
- Prairie Branch Elementary School
- Sni-A-Bar Elementary School
- Stony Point Elementary School

== Middle schools ==
- Grain Valley South Middle School
- Grain Valley North Middle School

== High schools ==
- Grain Valley High School

== Other ==
The district also has an Early Childhood Special Education Center for 3 to 5 year-olds who qualify for special education services.
