= Simon Cockrell =

American politician

Simon Cockrell (1745–1839) was an American Baptist minister and politician from Virginia.

== Early life ==
Simon Cockrell was born in 1745.

== Career ==
In 1780, he was allowed to preach the Baptist faith in Washington County, Virginia, when the official religion was the Church of England, as the Colony of Virginia was part of the British Empire until 1788. By 1782, he was given a license to marry in the same county.

He served as a member of the Virginia House of Delegates from 1791 to 1793, and again from 1798 to 1800.

== Death ==
He died in 1839 in Jackson County, Missouri, where he was buried.
