= Sni-A-Bar Township, Lafayette County, Missouri =

Township in Lafayette County, Missouri, US

Sni-A-Bar Township
- Civil township
- Location within Missouri
- Coordinates: 38°57′41.23″N 94°1′32.67″W

Sni-A-Bar Township (/ˈsnaɪ.ə.bɑːr/ SNY-ə-bar) is a township in Lafayette County, in the U.S. state of Missouri.

Sni-A-Bar Township was derived from the stream of the same name.
