= Humphries Brook =

- Location of the mouth of Humphries Brook

Location
- Country: United States
- State: New York
- County: Delaware

Physical characteristics
- Source
  - coordinates: 41°54′36″N 75°14′08″W
- Mouth: Delaware River
  - coordinates: 41°52′06″N 75°12′52″W
  - elevation: 860 ft (260 m)

Humphries Brook is a river in Delaware County, New York. It flows into Somerset Lake from the west, then exits the lake and flows south before converging with the Delaware River in Lordville.
