= Grain Valley, Missouri =

City in Jackson County, Missouri, United States

- City
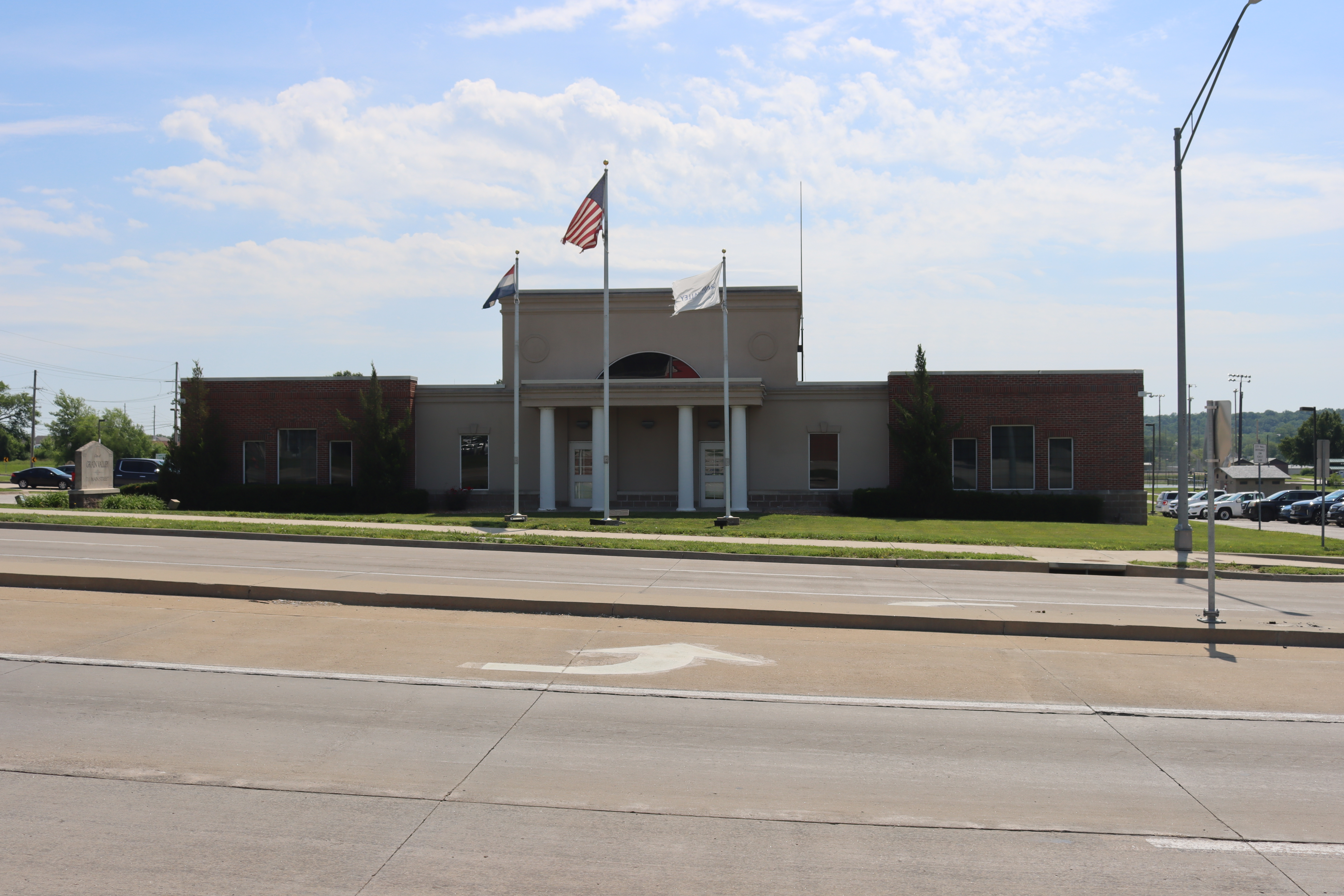
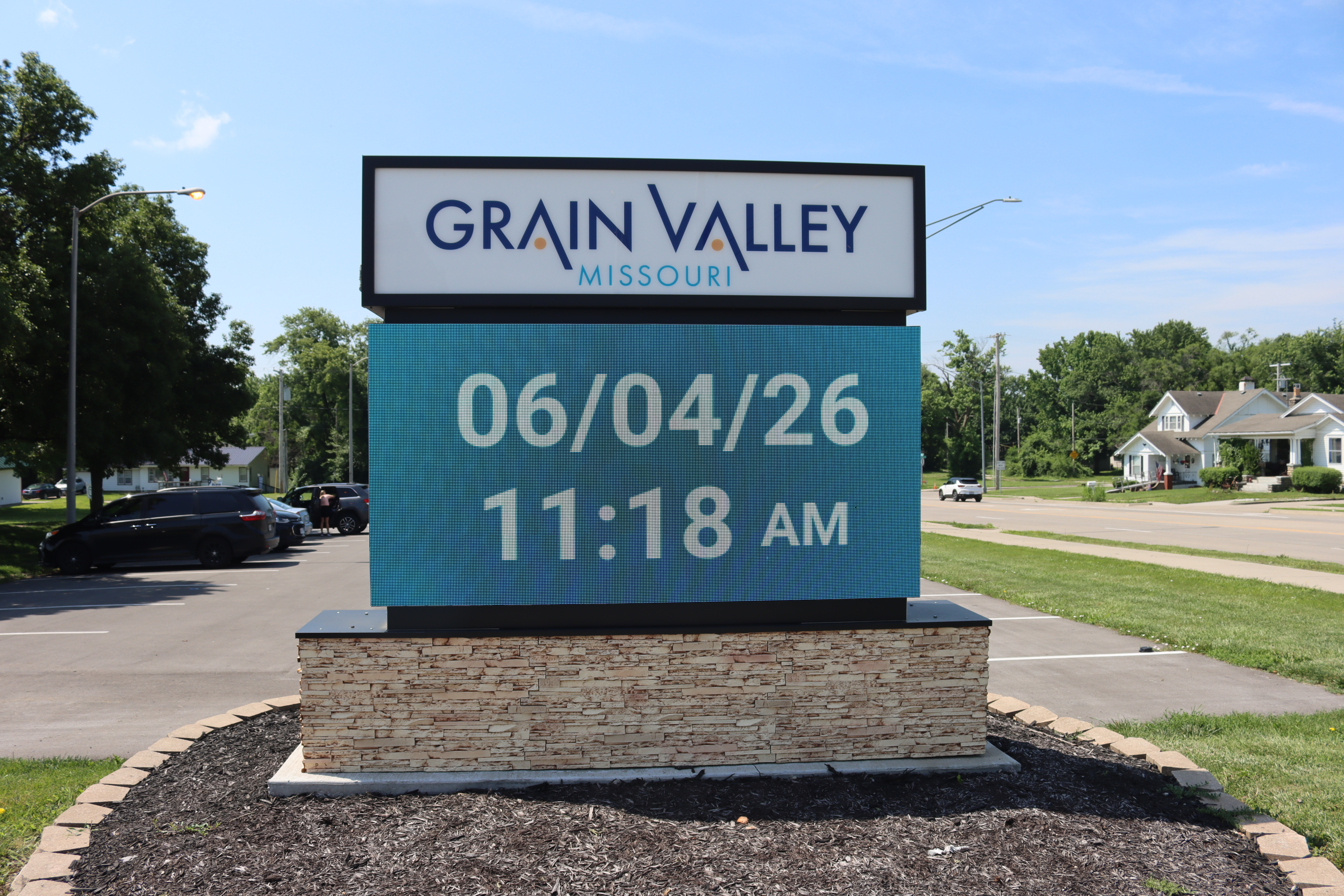
- City Hall Logo

- Location of Grain Valley, Missouri
- Coordinates: 39°0′31″N 94°12′27″W
- Country: United States
- State: Missouri
- County: Jackson
- Incorporated: 1945

Area
  - Total: 6.17 sq mi (15.98 km^{2})
  - Land: 6.16 sq mi (15.96 km^{2})
  - Water: 0.0077 sq mi (0.02 km^{2})
- Elevation: 794 ft (242 m)

Population (2020)
  - Total: 15,627
  - Density: 2,535.9/sq mi (979.13/km^{2})
- Time zone: UTC-6 (Central (CST))
  - Summer (DST): UTC-5 (CDT)
- ZIP code: 64029
- Area code: 816
- FIPS code: 29-28090
- GNIS feature ID: 0718661
- Website: City website

Grain Valley is a city in Jackson County, Missouri, United States. Grain Valley is located in the Kansas City Metropolitan Area and is a suburb of Kansas City. The population was 15,627 at the 2020 census. It is 23 miles (37 km) east of downtown Kansas City.

== History ==
Grain Valley was founded in the late 1870s. The city was named for the general character of the grain-producing region. A post office called Grain Valley has been in operation since 1879. Grain Valley was founded primarily by former residents and business owners of Pink Hill, Missouri and Stoney Point Missouri who moved to this area after the Chicago and Alton Railroad built a railway through this area in 1878, bypassing the former communities of Pink Hill, Missouri and Stony Point Missouri. The townspeople needed to take advantage of the commerce that the railroad would provide during that era.

== Geography ==
Grain Valley is located at 39°0′31″N 94°12′27″W (39.008733, -94.207465).

According to the United States Census Bureau, the city has a total area of 6.07 square miles (15.72 km^{2}), of which 6.06 square miles (15.70 km^{2}) is land and 0.01 square miles (0.03 km^{2}) is water.

== Demographics ==
Historical population
Census	Pop.	Note	%±
1880	80		—
1890	193		141.3%
1910	133		—
1920	354		166.2%
1930	358		1.1%
1940	362		1.1%
1950	348		−3.9%
1960	552		58.6%
1970	709		28.4%
1980	1,077	https://cityofgrainvalley.org/about/history/	51.9%
1990	1,901	https://cityofgrainvalley.org/about/history/	76.5%
2000	5,160		171.4%
2010	12,854		149.1%
2020	15,627		21.6%
U.S. Decennial Census

=== Racial and ethnic composition ===
Grain Valley city, Missouri – Racial and ethnic composition Note: the US Census treats Hispanic/Latino as an ethnic category. This table excludes Latinos from the racial categories and assigns them to a separate category. Hispanics/Latinos may be of any race.
Race / Ethnicity (NH = Non-Hispanic)	Pop 2000	Pop 2010	Pop 2020	% 2000	% 2010	% 2020
White alone (NH)	4,891	11,528	12,926	94.79%	89.68%	82.72%
Black or African American alone (NH)	28	315	426	0.54%	2.45%	2.73%
Native American or Alaska Native alone (NH)	19	51	60	0.37%	0.40%	0.38%
Asian alone (NH)	23	78	152	0.45%	0.61%	0.97%
Native Hawaiian or Pacific Islander alone (NH)	8	15	14	0.16%	0.12%	0.09%
Other race alone (NH)	0	7	38	0.00%	0.05%	0.24%
Mixed race or Multiracial (NH)	63	228	989	1.22%	1.77%	6.33%
Hispanic or Latino (any race)	128	632	1,022	2.48%	4.92%	6.54%
Total	5,160	12,854	15,627	100.00%	100.00%	100.00%

=== 2020 census ===
As of the 2020 census, Grain Valley had a population of 15,627 and a population density of 2,536.9 per square mile (979.1/km^{2}).

The median age was 34.5 years. 29.4% of residents were under the age of 18 and 10.8% of residents were 65 years of age or older. For every 100 females there were 95.2 males, and for every 100 females age 18 and over there were 91.8 males age 18 and over.

99.5% of residents lived in urban areas, while 0.5% lived in rural areas.

There were 5,579 households in Grain Valley, including 3,656 families. Of all households, 44.3% had children under the age of 18 living in them. Of all households, 55.2% were married-couple households, 12.6% were households with a male householder and no spouse or partner present, and 23.7% were households with a female householder and no spouse or partner present. About 20.8% of all households were made up of individuals and 8.4% had someone living alone who was 65 years of age or older. The average household size was 2.8 and the average family size was 3.3.

There were 5,764 housing units, of which 3.2% were vacant. The homeowner vacancy rate was 1.2% and the rental vacancy rate was 3.6%.

Racial composition as of the 2020 census
Race	Number	Percent
White	13,306	85.1%
Black or African American	445	2.8%
American Indian and Alaska Native	79	0.5%
Asian	154	1.0%
Native Hawaiian and Other Pacific Islander	14	0.1%
Some other race	256	1.6%
Two or more races	1,373	8.8%

=== Income and poverty ===
The 2016–2020 5-year American Community Survey estimates show that the median household income was $76,750 (with a margin of error of +/- $9,148) and the median family income was $85,895 (+/- $6,327). Males had a median income of $50,935 (+/- $4,403) versus $37,074 (+/- $4,801) for females. The median income for those above 16 years old was $42,926 (+/- $3,566). Approximately, 4.0% of families and 4.7% of the population were below the poverty line, including 5.5% of those under the age of 18 and 6.0% of those ages 65 or over.

=== 2010 census ===
In the 2010 census there were 12,854 people in 4,566 households, including 3,395 families, in the city. The population density was 2,121.1 inhabitants per square mile (819.0/km^{2}). There were 4,867 housing units at an average density of 803.1 per square mile (310.1/km^{2}). The racial makeup of the city was 92.6% White, 2.5% African American, 0.6% Native American, 0.6% Asian, 0.1% Pacific Islander, 1.2% from other races, and 2.3% from two or more races. Hispanic or Latino of any race were 4.9%.

Of the 4,566 households 47.4% had children under the age of 18 living with them, 56.0% were married couples living together, 13.1% had a female householder with no husband present, 5.3% had a male householder with no wife present, and 25.6% were non-families. 19.1% of households were one person and 5.6% were one person aged 65 or older. The average household size was 2.81 and the average family size was 3.22.

The median age was 30.5 years. 32.1% of residents were under the age of 18; 7.5% were between the ages of 18 and 24; 35.2% were from 25 to 44; 18.3% were from 45 to 64; and 6.8% were 65 or older. The gender makeup of the city was 48.9% male and 51.1% female.

=== 2000 census ===
At the 2000 census there were 5,160 people. The population density was 1,075.0 inhabitants per square mile (415.1/km^{2}). There were 2,022 housing units at an average density of 421.2 per square mile (162.6/km^{2}). The racial makeup of the city was 96.43% White, 0.56% African American, 0.48% Asian, 0.39% Native American, 0.16% Pacific Islander, 0.43% from other races, and 1.55% from two or more races. Hispanic or Latino of any race were 2.48%.

Of the 1,921 households 44.9% had children under the age of 18 living with them, 61.2% were married couples living together, 9.8% had a female householder with no husband present, and 24.9% were non-families. 20.4% of households were one person and 6.6% were one person aged 65 or older. The average household size was 2.69 and the average family size was 3.11.

The age distribution was 31.0% under the age of 18, 9.3% from 18 to 24, 39.0% from 25 to 44, 14.7% from 45 to 64, and 6.0% 65 or older. The median age was 29 years. For every 100 females, there were 99.6 males. For every 100 females age 18 and over, there were 92.4 males.

The median household income was $50,118 and the median family income was $57,240. Males had a median income of $37,436 versus $27,961 for females. The per capita income for the city was $20,265. About 3.9% of families and 4.4% of the population were below the poverty line, including 6.2% of those under age 18 and 8.8% of those age 65 or over.

== Economy ==
The Owner–Operator Independent Drivers Association is based in Grain Valley.

== Education ==
The Grain Valley R-V School District serves Grain Valley, as well as parts of Blue Springs, Oak Grove, and unincorporated eastern Jackson County, in the State of Missouri. The district had an enrollment of over 4000 students in 2015, up from 1659 students in 2000. Grain Valley R-V School District operates four elementary schools, two middle schools, and Grain Valley High School. Grain Valley has a public library, a branch of the Mid-Continent Public Library.

== Notable residents ==
- Kara Eaker, gymnast
- Jacob Misiorowski, professional baseball player

== See also ==
- List of cities in Missouri
