= Hiler, Missouri =

Unincorporated community in Missouri, U.S.

Coordinates: 39°04′34″N 94°11′59″W

Hiler is an unincorporated community in Jackson County, in the U.S. state of Missouri.

== History ==
A post office called Hiler was established in 1893, and remained in operation until 1902. The community was named after the maiden name of the wife of a first settler.
