= Lee's Summit R-VII School District =

School district in Missouri, U.S.

Address
- 301 Northeast Tudor Road Lee's Summit, Missouri, 64086; United States

District information
- Type: Public
- Grades: PreK–12
- NCES District ID: 2918300

Students and staff
- Students: 17,790 (2020–2021)
- Teachers: 1,217.01 (on an FTE basis)
- Staff: 1,448.15 (on an FTE basis)
- Student–teacher ratio: 14.62:1

Other information
- Website: www.lsr7.org

The Lee's Summit R-7 School District is a school district located in Missouri and in the Kansas City metropolitan area.

The district is mostly in Jackson County. There, it has large segments of Lee's Summit and Kansas City, as well as the entirety of Lake Lotawana and Unity Village, the majorities of Greenwood and Tarsney Lakes, as well as small portions of Blue Springs and Pleasant Hill. A portion of the district is in Cass County; there, it includes a large segment of Lake Winnebago, a piece of that county's part of Greenwood, and a small piece of Lee's Summit. The district serves an area of approximately 117 square miles (300 km^{2}) and has an enrollment of close to 18,000.

== Schools ==
There are 29 schools in the district, including:

Elementary

- Great Beginnings Early Education Center
- Cedar Creek Elementary School
- Greenwood Elementary School
- Hawthorn Hill Elementary School
- Hazel Grove Elementary School
- Highland Park Elementary School
- Lee's Summit Elementary School
- Longview Farm Elementary School
- Mason Elementary School
- Meadow Lane Elementary School
- Pleasant Lea Elementary School
- Prairie View Elementary School
- Richardson Elementary School
- Summit Pointe Elementary School
- Sunset Valley Elementary School
- Trailridge Elementary School
- Underwood Elementary School
- Westview Elementary School
- Woodland Elementary School

Middle Schools

- Bernard C. Campbell Middle School
- East Trails Middle School
- Pleasant Lea Middle School
- Summit Lakes Middle School

High Schools

- Lee's Summit High School
- Lee's Summit North High School
- Lee's Summit West High School
- Summit Ridge Academy
- Summit Technology Academy
- Miller Park Center

== Superintendent ==
David Buck is the superintendent. He began serving as the district's superintendent on July 1, 2020. Previously Emily Miller served as the district's interim superintendent.

Dennis L. Carpenter served as superintendent of the District from July 1, 2017, to July 23, 2019. He resigned amid racial-equity policy disagreements between himself and entities in the Lee's Summit community. Upon his exit from the school board, the District paid $750,000 to Carpenter as part of his negotiation to step down as superintendent. Carpenter was the first black superintendent of the Lee's Summit R-VII School District.
