= Somerset Lake =

Lake in New York, United States

- Location of Somerset Lake within New York
- Location: Delaware County, New York
- Coordinates: 41°54′37″N 75°13′44″W
- Primary inflows: Humphries Brook
- Primary outflows: Humphries Brook
- Basin countries: United States
- Surface area: 58 acres (23 ha)
- Surface elevation: 1,542 ft (470 m)
- Settlements: Lordville

Somerset Lake is a small lake located north-northwest of Lordville in Delaware County, New York. It drains southwest via Humphries Brook, which flows into the Delaware River. Black Ash Swamp is located southwest of Somerset Lake.

== See also ==
- List of lakes in New York
