= Unity Village, Missouri =

- Village
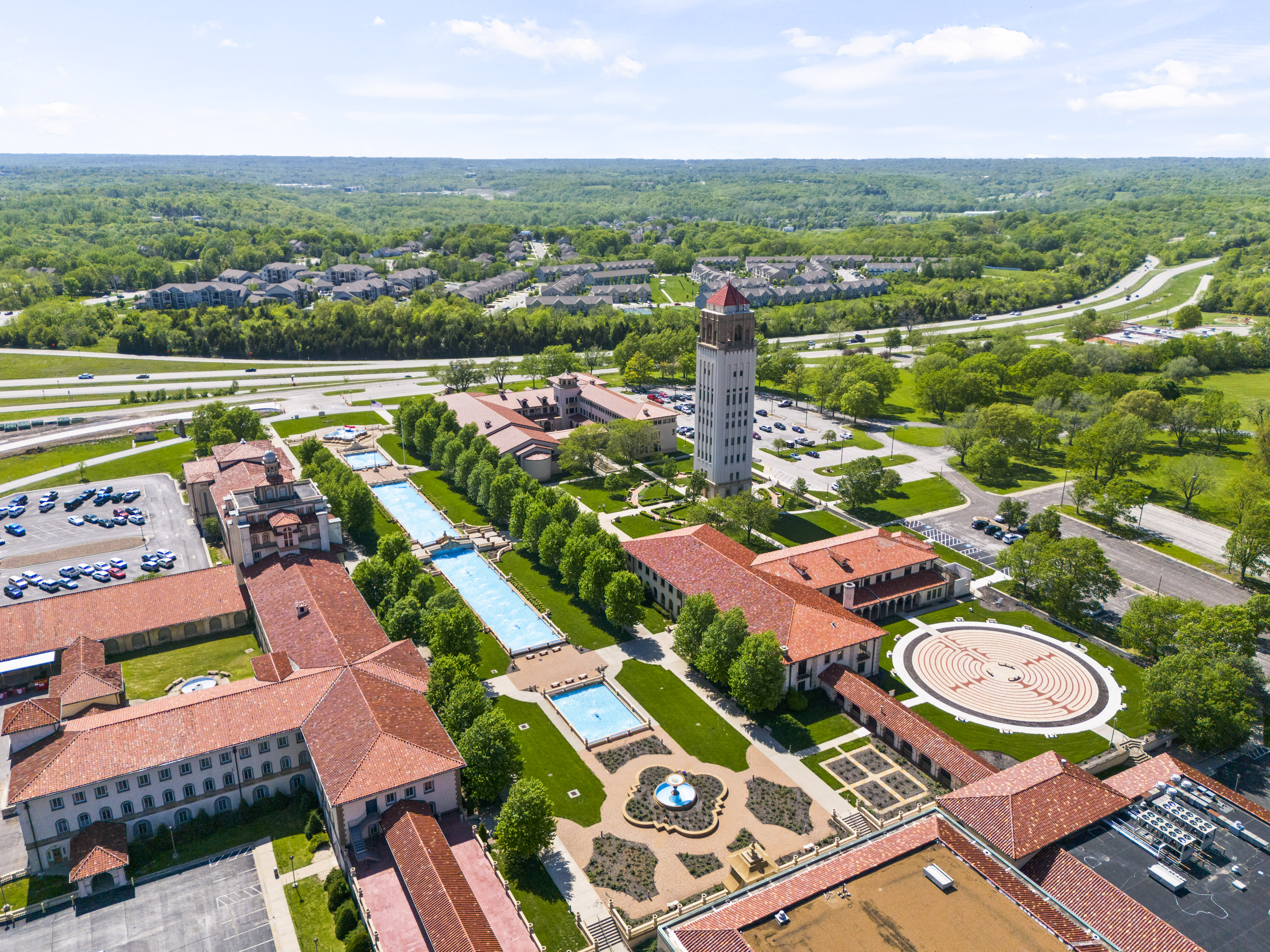
- Unity Village Campus

- Location of Unity Village, Missouri

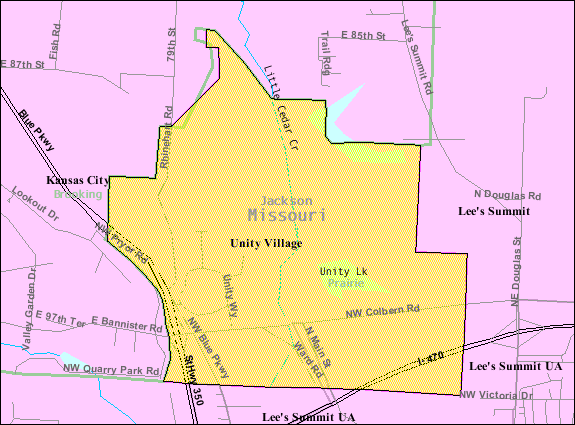
- U.S. Census Map
- Coordinates: 38°56′47″N 94°23′58″W
- Country: United States
- State: Missouri
- County: Jackson

Area
  - Total: 1.53 sq mi (3.95 km^{2})
  - Land: 1.46 sq mi (3.78 km^{2})
  - Water: 0.066 sq mi (0.17 km^{2})
- Elevation: 935 ft (285 m)

Population (2020)
  - Total: 66
  - Density: 45.2/sq mi (17.46/km^{2})
- Time zone: UTC-6 (Central (CST))
  - Summer (DST): UTC-5 (CDT)
- ZIP codes: 64065
- Area code: 816
- FIPS code: 29-75202
- GNIS feature ID: 0728064
- Website: unityvillage.org

Unity Village is a village in Jackson County, Missouri, United States, bordering Kansas City and Lee's Summit. It is part of the Kansas City metropolitan area. Its population was 66 at the 2020 census. The founders of the Unity spiritual movement, Charles and Myrtle Fillmore, purchased a 58-acre (23 ha) farm in 1919 as a weekend getaway for employees of their downtown Kansas City headquarters. In March 1920, the land came to be known as Unity Farm, and the following purchase of 12 surrounding farms expanded the land to nearly 1,500 acres.

The farm produced fruits and vegetables, including 7,500 apple trees, a 400-tree peach orchard, 12 acres of grapevines, cherry and plum trees, and fields of oats, corn, wheat, strawberries, asparagus, and soybeans. Unity Farm also supported a poultry house containing 2,000 white leghorn hens, whose eggs helped sustain a meatless menu at the Unity Inn cafeteria downtown.

The Fillmores’ work was consolidated at Unity Village after World War II, and it is now the world headquarters for the ongoing spiritual movement. On March 15, 1953, the State of Missouri officially incorporated the land as Unity Village. In the 2010 census, its population was 99.

The Unity Village is a campus with historic buildings. The grounds dwellings in the English Cotswold style as well as Mediterranean-inspired buildings designed by Waldo Rickert Fillmore (also known as Rickert), the second son of Charles and Myrtle Fillmore. The Tower and an office building then used for the Silent Unity Prayer Ministry opened in 1929 and are on the National Register of Historic Places.

Unity Village is also home to two artificial lakes. Lake Charles R. Fillmore (named for the grandson of the Unity cofounders) was created in 1926 to supply water to the farm and orchard that Unity maintained until the 1980s. A crew of 100 men built a concrete buttress dam, the only one of its kind in Missouri and one of the few west of the Mississippi River, at a cost of $100,000 to form the lake. The lake is 42 feet deep and covers 21 surface acres, holding about 75 million gallons of water. pumped to the on-campus water treatment plant. Unity is now served by Lees Summit water.

== Geography ==
Unity Village is 15 miles (24 km) southeast of downtown Kansas City,

at 38°56′47″N 94°23′58″W (38.946283, -94.399311).

According to the United States Census Bureau, the village has a total area of 1.97 square miles (5.10 km^{2}), of which 1.90 square miles (4.92 km^{2}) is land and 0.07 square miles (0.18 km^{2}) is water.

== Tornado ==
On July 1, 2015, a tornado damaged roofs in Unity Village.

== Demographics ==
Historical population
| Census | Pop. | Note | %± |
|---|---|---|---|
| 1960 | 153 | | — |
| 1970 | 242 | | 58.2% |
| 1980 | 202 | | −16.5% |
| 1990 | 138 | | −31.7% |
| 2000 | 140 | | 1.4% |
| 2010 | 99 | | −29.3% |
| 2020 | 66 | | −33.3% |
U.S. Decennial Census

=== Racial and ethnic composition ===
Unity Village village, Missouri – Racial and ethnic composition Note: the US Census treats Hispanic/Latino as an ethnic category. This table excludes Latinos from the racial categories and assigns them to a separate category. Hispanics/Latinos may be of any race.
| Race / Ethnicity (NH = Non-Hispanic) | Pop 2000 | Pop 2010 | Pop 2020 | % 2000 | % 2010 | % 2020 |
|---|---|---|---|---|---|---|
| White alone (NH) | 125 | 80 | 49 | 89.29% | 80.81% | 74.24% |
| Black or African American alone (NH) | 4 | 7 | 6 | 2.86% | 7.07% | 9.09% |
| Native American or Alaska Native alone (NH) | 0 | 0 | 1 | 0.00% | 0.00% | 1.52% |
| Asian alone (NH) | 1 | 2 | 2 | 0.71% | 2.02% | 3.03% |
| Native Hawaiian or Pacific Islander alone (NH) | 0 | 0 | 0 | 0.00% | 0.00% | 0.00% |
| Other race alone (NH) | 1 | 0 | 1 | 0.71% | 0.00% | 1.52% |
| Mixed race or Multiracial (NH) | 1 | 4 | 4 | 0.71% | 4.04% | 6.06% |
| Hispanic or Latino (any race) | 8 | 6 | 3 | 5.71% | 6.06% | 4.55% |
| Total | 140 | 99 | 66 | 100.00% | 100.00% | 100.00% |

=== 2010 census ===
At the 2010 census there were 99 people, 65 households, and 11 families living in the village. The population density was 52.1 inhabitants per square mile (20.1 inhabitants/km^{2}). There were 73 housing units at an average density of 38.4 units per square mile (14.8 units/km^{2}). The racial makeup of the village was 85.9% White, 7.1% African American, 2.0% Asian, and 5.1% from two or more races. Hispanic or Latino of any race were 6.1%.

Of the 65 households 7.7% had children under the age of 18 living with them, 9.2% were married couples living together, 4.6% had a female householder with no husband present, 3.1% had a male householder with no wife present, and 83.1% were non-families. 73.8% of households were one person and 16.9% were one person aged 65 or older. The average household size was 1.32 and the average family size was 2.36.

The median age in the village was 52.5 years. 6.1% of residents were under the age of 18; 5% were between the ages of 18 and 24; 17.2% were from 25 to 44; 55.6% were from 45 to 64; and 16.2% were 65 or older. The gender makeup of the village was 34.3% male and 65.7% female.

=== 2000 census ===
At the 2000 census there were 140 people, 81 households, and 19 families living in the village. The population density was 73.6 inhabitants per square mile (28.4 inhabitants/km^{2}). There were 82 housing units at an average density of 43.1 units per square mile (16.6 units/km^{2}). The racial makup of the village was 94.29% White, 2.86% African American, 0.71% Asian, 0.71% from other races, and 1.43% from two or more races. Hispanic or Latino of any race were 5.71%.

Of the 81 households 2.5% had children under the age of 18 living with them, 18.5% were married couples living together, 3.7% had a female householder with no husband present, and 76.5% were non-families. 71.6% of households were one person and 21.0% were one person aged 65 or older. The average household size was 1.35 and the average family size was 2.21.

The age distribution was 2.1% under the age of 18, 7.9% from 18 to 24, 31.4% from 25 to 44, 42.9% from 45 to 64, and 15.7% 65 or older. The median age was 50 years. For every 100 females, there were 62.8 males. For every 100 females age 18 and over, there were 63.1 males.

The median household income was $29,583 and the median family income was $87,667. Males had a median income of $41,765 versus $30,667 for females. The per capita income for the village was $31,836. There were none of the families and 11.9% of the population living below the poverty line, including no under eighteens and none of those over 64.

== Education ==
It is in the Lee's Summit R-VII School District.

Metropolitan Community College has the Lee's Summit school district in its taxation area.
