= Grain Valley High School =

Public school in Missouri, United States

Coordinates: 39.0090°N 94.2065°W

- 551 SW Eagles Parkway, Grain Valley, MO; 64029; United States

Information
- Principal: Drew Smith
- Staff: 87.28 (FTE)
- Enrollment: 1,482 (2024-2025)
- Student to teacher ratio: 16.98
- Colors: Blue and white
- Team name: Eagles
- Website: gvhs.grainvalleyschools.org

Grain Valley High School (GVHS) is a public high school in Grain Valley, Missouri, United States, operated by the Grain Valley R-V School District. It serves students in grades 9 through 12.

== History ==
Grain Valley's first school was built in 1887; it began as an elementary school and later added high school coursework. In 1906, six local school districts (Grain Valley, Pink Hill, Round Grove, Oak Hill, Stony Point, and Capelle) were consolidated, and a two-year high school opened in September 1907 with four students. A third year was added in 1916, and it became a four-year high school in 1918. The district dates its first high school graduating class, of four students, to 1909.

The school building was destroyed by fire on November 7, 1925. A replacement building on Main Street opened the following year and housed all grade levels until 1953, when an elementary school was built on the same lot. The Grain Valley R-V district (Reorganized School District No. 5 of Jackson County) was formed that same year. In 1988, the district purchased land on Route AA, now Eagles Parkway, where the current high school and Sni-A-Bar Elementary were built.

Enrollment grew quickly in the 2000s and 2010s: the district graduated its first class of more than 100 students in 2004, more than 200 in 2015, and more than 300 in 2018.

=== 2022 "Safe Space" sign removal ===
On April 25, 2022, the district told families that the Board of Education had directed administrators to remove "Safe Space for all" cards and stickers that some high school teachers had displayed to signal that students could approach them with personal questions related to LGBTQ topics. The district said the board acted after receiving a concern, and that its goal was for every classroom to be safe for all students rather than only those where a teacher chose to display a sign. The district's deputy superintendent told the local newspaper that the board did not hold a vote, describing the removal as an administrative decision made on the basis of board input.

The decision was criticized by some students, parents, teachers, and alumni, and about 50 people rallied in support of LGBTQ students on April 29. The district responded by announcing listening sessions. In late May and early June 2022, it surveyed middle and high school students on school climate, held student focus groups, and hosted a community session facilitated by an outside firm, CESO Communications.

== Academics ==
The school offers Advanced Placement (AP) courses and three Project Lead the Way (PLTW) pathways: engineering, biomedical science, and computer science. It is an A+ designated school under a Missouri program through which graduates who meet the program's requirements can receive state-funded scholarships to attend participating community colleges or technical schools. The school is accredited with distinction by the Missouri Department of Elementary and Secondary Education.

== Extracurricular activities ==
The school competes in Missouri State High School Activities Association (MSHSAA) speech and debate, theatre, music, and scholar bowl. Its broadcast journalism program, Grain Valley Television (GVTV), produces a weekly show and live broadcasts of school events.

In May 2015, the Grain Valley Marching Eagles were selected to march in the 2016 Macy's Thanksgiving Day Parade.

== Athletics ==
Grain Valley's teams, the Eagles, compete in MSHSAA and have been members of the Suburban Conference since the 2018–19 school year. Sanctioned sports include baseball, basketball, cross country, football, girls' flag football, golf, soccer, softball, swimming and diving, tennis, track and field, volleyball, and wrestling, along with sideline cheerleading and dance. MSHSAA credits the school with one state team championship (Class 1A, 1978) and top-four state finishes in baseball, softball, boys' and girls' soccer, girls' tennis, and wrestling.

== Notable alumni ==
- Rylan Childers, soccer midfielder drafted by the Kansas City Current in the 2023 NWSL Draft
- Jacob Misiorowski (2020), pitcher for the Milwaukee Brewers; 2025 MLB All-Star and member of the 2026 World Series champions
