= Black Ash Swamp =

Lake in New York, United States

- Location of Black Ash Swamp within New York
- Location: Delaware County, New York
- Coordinates: 41°54′04″N 75°14′48″W
- Primary inflows: Blue Mill Stream
- Primary outflows: Blue Mill Stream
- Surface area: 25 acres (0.039 mi^{2})
- Surface elevation: 1,358 feet (414 m)
- Settlements: Lordville

Black Ash Swamp is a small lake located northwest of Lordville in Delaware County, New York. Blue Mill Stream flows into the lake from the north, it drains south-southwest via Blue Mill Stream, which flows into the Delaware River. Somerset Lake is located northeast of Black Ash Swamp.

== See also ==
- List of lakes in New York
