= Lake Tapawingo, Missouri =

- City
- Location of Lake Tapawingo, Missouri
- Coordinates: 39°1′11″N 94°18′34″W
- Country: United States
- State: Missouri
- County: Jackson

Area
  - Total: 0.45 sq mi (1.17 km^{2})
  - Land: 0.32 sq mi (0.83 km^{2})
  - Water: 0.13 sq mi (0.34 km^{2})
- Elevation: 850 ft (259 m)

Population (2020)
  - Total: 794
  - Density: 2,480.4/sq mi (957.67/km^{2})
- Time zone: UTC-6 (Central (CST))
  - Summer (DST): UTC-5 (CDT)
- ZIP code: 64015
- Area code: 816
- FIPS code: 29-40196
- GNIS feature ID: 0755426
- Website: www.laketapawingomo.org

Lake Tapawingo is a city in Jackson County, Missouri, United States. As of the 2020 census, Lake Tapawingo had a population of 794.

== History ==
Lake Tapawingo was constructed by the Lake Tapawingo Development Company in 1926 as an "exclusive sports retreat and rest haven". The city was named after a lake within its borders. Derived from a Native American word meaning "beautiful water" or "beautiful place", it is also said to be named after a Native American princess. The City of Lake Tapawingo was officially formed in 1962 to prevent annexation by the larger cities of either Blue Springs, Missouri or Independence, Missouri.

== Geography ==
According to the United States Census Bureau, the city has a total area of 0.50 square miles (1.29 km^{2}), of which 0.37 square miles (0.96 km^{2}) is land and 0.13 square miles (0.34 km^{2}) is water.

== Demographics ==
Historical population
Census	Pop.	Note	%±
1970	867		—
1980	925		6.7%
1990	761		−17.7%
2000	843		10.8%
2010	730		−13.4%
2020	794		8.8%
U.S. Decennial Census

=== Racial and ethnic composition ===
Lake Tapawingo city, Missouri – Racial and ethnic composition Note: the US Census treats Hispanic/Latino as an ethnic category. This table excludes Latinos from the racial categories and assigns them to a separate category. Hispanics/Latinos may be of any race.
Race / Ethnicity (NH = Non-Hispanic)	Pop 2000	Pop 2010	Pop 2020	% 2000	% 2010	% 2020
White alone (NH)	819	692	728	97.15%	94.79%	91.69%
Black or African American alone (NH)	0	5	6	0.00%	0.68%	0.76%
Native American or Alaska Native alone (NH)	0	4	5	0.00%	0.55%	0.63%
Asian alone (NH)	1	3	1	0.12%	0.41%	0.13%
Native Hawaiian or Pacific Islander alone (NH)	0	0	0	0.00%	0.00%	0.00%
Other race alone (NH)	1	0	7	0.12%	0.00%	0.88%
Mixed race or Multiracial (NH)	3	13	27	0.36%	1.78%	3.40%
Hispanic or Latino (any race)	19	13	20	2.25%	1.78%	2.52%
Total	843	730	794	100.00%	100.00%	100.00%

=== 2010 census ===
As of the census of 2010, there were 730 people, 342 households, and 247 families residing in the city. The population density was 1,973.0 inhabitants per square mile (761.8/km^{2}). There were 377 housing units at an average density of 1,018.9 per square mile (393.4/km^{2}). The racial makeup of the city was 96.2% White, 0.7% African American, 0.5% Native American, 0.5% Asian, and 2.1% from two or more races. Hispanic or Latino of any race were 1.8% of the population.

There were 342 households, of which 18.1% had children under the age of 18 living with them, 62.0% were married couples living together, 7.3% had a female householder with no husband present, 2.9% had a male householder with no wife present, and 27.8% were non-families. 23.7% of all households were made up of individuals, and 9.6% had someone living alone who was 65 years of age or older. The average household size was 2.13 and the average family size was 2.45.

The median age in the city was 54.9 years. 11.2% of residents were under the age of 18; 5% were between the ages of 18 and 24; 16.8% were from 25 to 44; 42.4% were from 45 to 64; and 24.8% were 65 years of age or older. The gender makeup of the city was 48.5% male and 51.5% female.

=== 2000 census ===
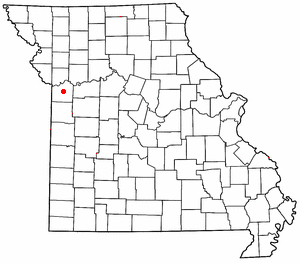
Lake Tapawingo, Missouri

As of the census of 2000, there were 843 people, 350 households, and 259 families residing in the city. The population density was 2,454.6 inhabitants per square mile (947.7/km^{2}). There were 373 housing units at an average density of 1,086.1 per square mile (419.3/km^{2}). The racial makeup of the city was 97.98% White, 0.12% Asian, 0.71% from other races, and 1.19% from two or more races. Hispanic or Latino of any race were 2.25% of the population.

There were 350 households, out of which 22.3% had children under the age of 18 living with them, 67.7% were married couples living together, 4.6% had a female householder with no husband present, and 26.0% were non-families. 20.6% of all households were made up of individuals, and 6.9% had someone living alone who was 65 years of age or older. The average household size was 2.41 and the average family size was 2.79.

In the city the population was spread out, with 19.6% under the age of 18, 5.5% from 18 to 24, 20.5% from 25 to 44, 38.2% from 45 to 64, and 16.3% who were 65 years of age or older. The median age was 47 years. For every 100 females, there were 99.3 males. For every 100 females age 18 and over, there were 96.0 males.

The median income for a household in the city was $73,500, and the median income for a family was $77,493. Males had a median income of $52,708 versus $31,518 for females. The per capita income for the city was $32,141. About 2.6% of families and 3.3% of the population were below the poverty line, including 5.5% of those under age 18 and 2.4% of those age 65 or over.

== Education ==
Lake Tapawingo is served by the Blue Springs R-IV School District.

Metropolitan Community College has the Blue Springs school district in its taxation area.
