= Blue Mills, Missouri =

Unincorporated community in Missouri

Coordinates: 39°08′58″N 94°18′11″W

Blue Mills is an unincorporated community in Jackson County, in the U.S. state of Missouri.

== History ==
The community was named for a watermill on the Little Blue River. A post office called Blue Mill was established in 1835, and remained in operation until 1895. A variant name was Twyman.
