= Pink Hill, Missouri =

Unincorporated community in Missouri, U.S.

Coordinates: 39°03′01″N 94°11′50″W

Pink Hill is an unincorporated community in Jackson County, in the U.S. state of Missouri.

== History ==
A post office called Pink Hill was established in 1854, and remained in operation until 1902. The community was named for a hill near the town site where pink flowers grew.
