= Cockrell, Missouri =

Unincorporated community in Missouri, U.S.

Coordinates: 38°53′08″N 94°14′16″W

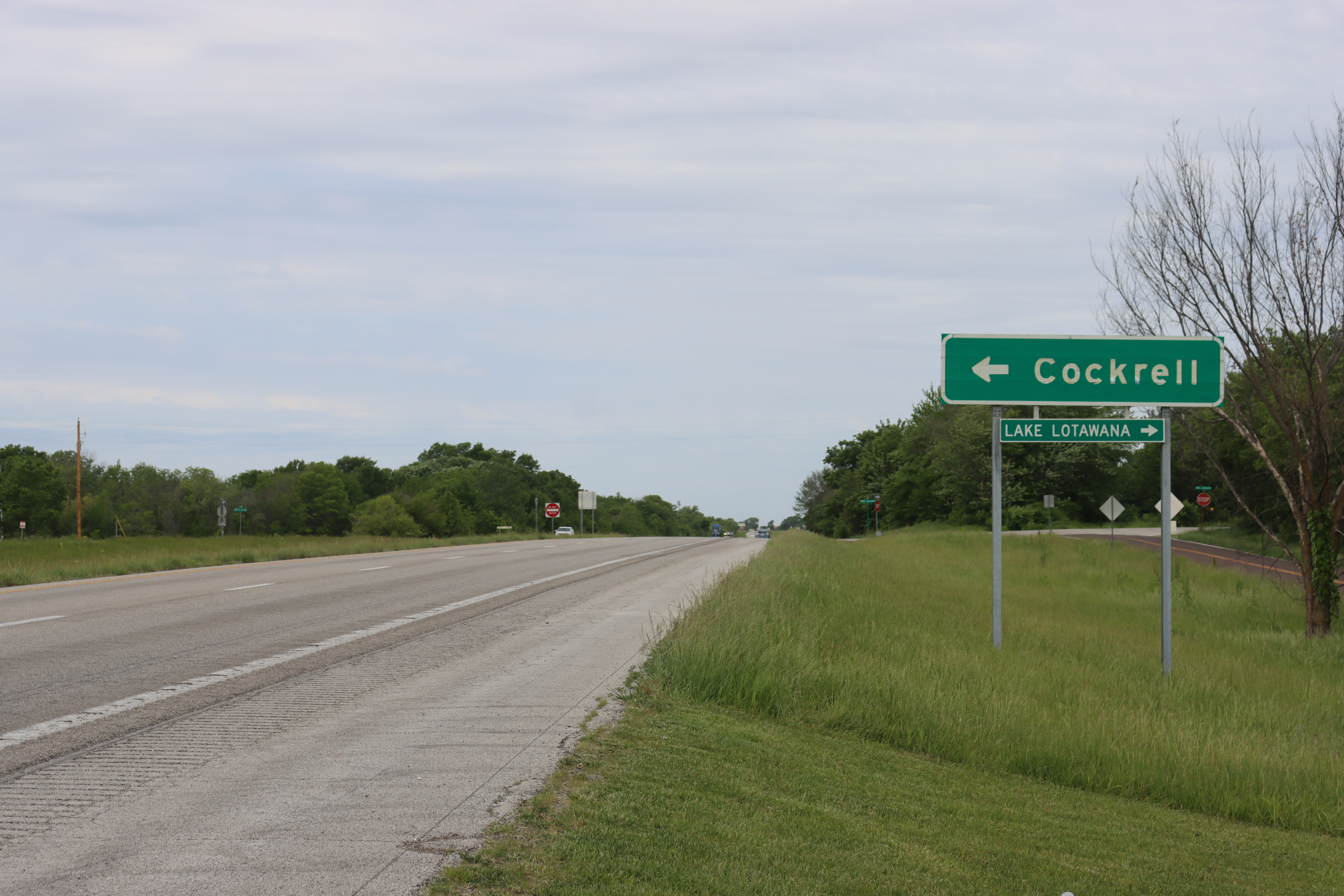
A sign on U.S. 50 signing the unincorporated community of Cockrell

Cockrell is an unincorporated community in Jackson County, in the U.S. state of Missouri.

== History ==
A post office called Cockrell was established in 1886, and remained in operation until 1902. The community has the name of Francis Cockrell, a state legislator.
