= USS Alvin C. Cockrell =

John C. Butler-class destroyer escort

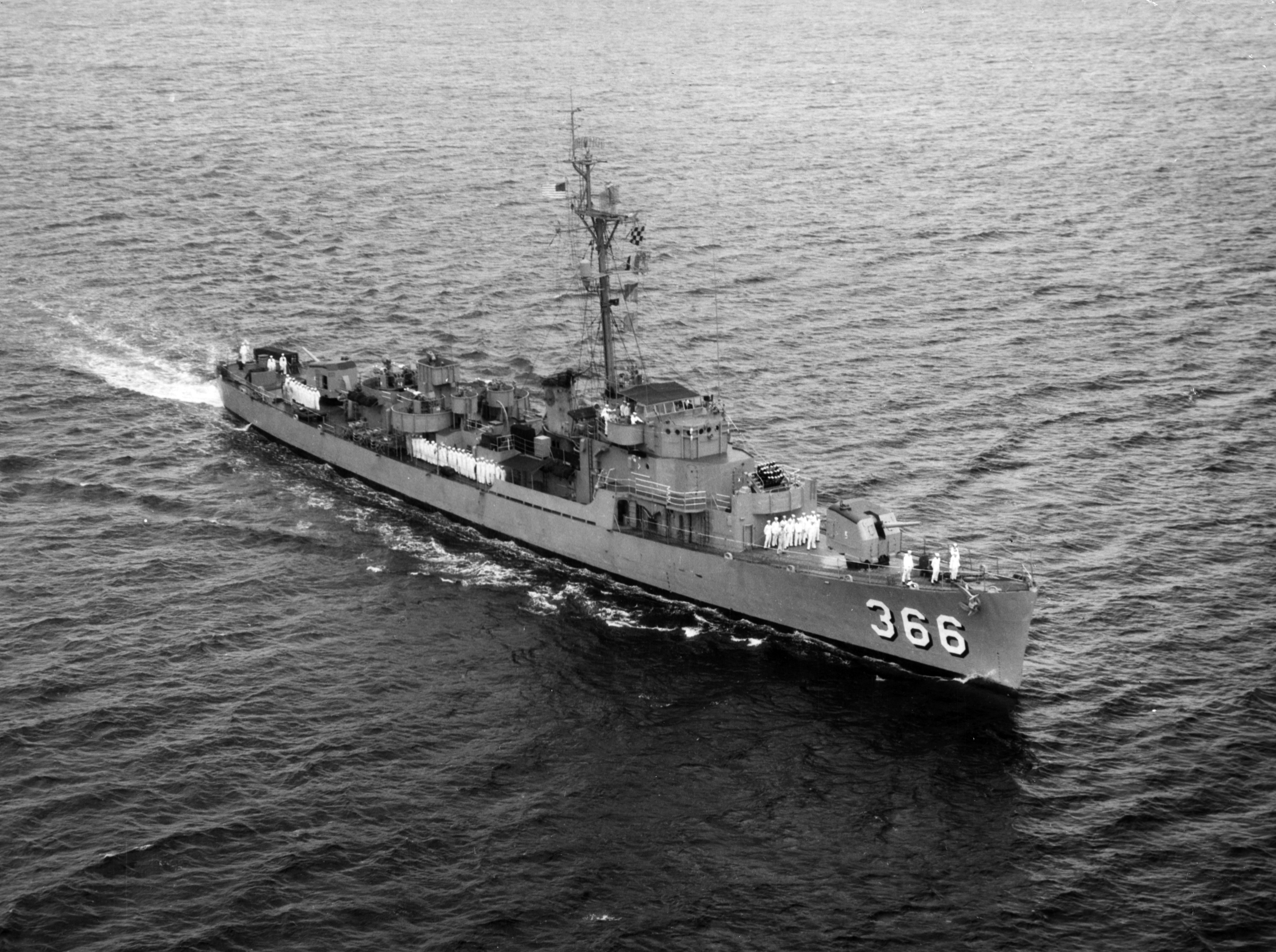
- USS Alvin C. Cockrell underway on 26 April 1958

History

United States
- Name: Alvin C. Cockrell
- Namesake: Alvin C. Cockrell
- Builder: Consolidated Steel Corporation, Orange, Texas
- Laid down: 1 May 1944
- Launched: 8 August 1944
- Commissioned: 7 October 1944 to 2 July 1946
- Decommissioned: 2 July 1946
- Recommissioned: 27 June 1951
- Decommissioned: 17 January 1959
- In service: 1 August 1962
- Out of service: 20 September 1968
- Stricken: 23 September 1968
- Fate: Sunk as target off California 19 September 1969

General characteristics
- Class & type: John C. Butler-class destroyer escort
- Displacement: 1,350 long tons (1,372 t)
- Length: 306 ft (93 m)
- Beam: 36 ft 8 in (11.18 m)
- Draft: 9 ft 5 in (2.87 m)
- Propulsion: 2 boilers, 2 geared turbine engines, 12,000 shp (8,900 kW); 2 propellers
- Speed: 24 knots (44 km/h)
- Range: 6,000 nmi (11,000 km) at 12 kn (22 km/h)
- Complement: 14 officers, 201 enlisted
- Armament: 2 × single 5 in (127 mm) guns; 2 × twin 40 mm (1.6 in) AA guns; 10 × single 20 mm (0.79 in) AA guns; 1 × triple 21 in (533 mm) torpedo tubes; 8 × depth charge throwers; 1 × Hedgehog ASW mortar; 2 × depth charge racks

USS Alvin C. Cockrell (DE-366) was a John C. Butler-class destroyer escort in service with the United States Navy from 1944 to 1946 and from 1951 to 1968. She was finally sunk as a target in 1969.

== Namesake ==
Alvin Chester Cockrell, Jr. was born on 18 September 1918 in Hazlehurst, Mississippi. He joined the United States Marine Corps and served as an enlisted man until accepting an appointment as 2nd lieutenant, USMCR, on 25 June 1940. Over the next two years he served at Marine barracks at Quantico, Guantanamo Bay, Parris Island and New River.

He was appointed a 1st lieutenant on 2 December 1941. Assigned to Company "B", 1st Battalion, 7th Marines, Fleet Marine Force, he landed with the 7th Marines on Guadalcanal on his 24th birthday, 18 September 1942. Within a week, the 1/7th Marines, was to conduct a reconnaissance in force of the region between the Matanikau River and the village of Kokumbona, led by Lieutenant Colonel Lewis B. "Chesty" Puller and departed the perimeter on 23 September. The point of Puller's battalion surprised elements of the Japanese Oka Detachment as they were sitting down cooking rice on the slopes of Mount Austen (Mambulo), late on the afternoon of 24 September south of Lunga Point. The sound of firing having alerted the enemy's main body, a brisk battle ensued; as it developed, Cockrell led his platoon in assaulting a strongly held Japanese position against heavy machine gun and rifle fire. He was killed in the ensuing action, one of seven marines who died in the engagement. He was posthumously awarded the Navy Cross.

== History ==
The ship's keel was laid down on 1 May 1944 at Orange, Texas, by the Consolidated Steel Corp.. Alvin C. Cockrell was launched on 27 June 1944, sponsored by Mrs. James A. Perkins, the sister of the late 1st Lt. Cockrell. The destroyer escort was commissioned on 7 August 1944 at her builder's yard.

=== World War II ===
After initial fitting out alongside the City Docks at Orange, Alvin C. Cockrell shifted to Galveston, Texas, arriving on 14 October, and continued fitting out at the Todd-Galveston Shipbuilding, Inc., yard. Completing these preparations for service on 25 October, she sailed for Bermuda that afternoon in company with her sister ship French, for shakedown training. Arriving at noon on the last day of October, the new destroyer escort carried out her shakedown training out of Bermuda until 29 November, after which time she sailed for Boston Navy Yard and post-shakedown availability. Underway from Boston, Massachusetts, on 10 December, Alvin C. Cockrell arrived at Norfolk, Virginia, the following day.

On 15 December, Alvin C. Cockrell sailed from Norfolk, and escorted the attack transport Thomas Jefferson to the Panama Canal Zone, arriving there on 20 December. Transiting the canal the same day, the destroyer escort then proceeded independently to San Diego, California, arriving there three days after Christmas of 1944. She sailed thence for the Hawaiian Islands, reaching Pearl Harbor on the afternoon of 7 January 1945.

Alvin C. Cockrell then spent the next several days operating locally out of Pearl Harbor, conducting target practice, serving as a target for a division of motor torpedo boats, undergoing an availability alongside the destroyer tender Yosemite, and carrying out gunnery exercises with student officers from the Destroyers, Pacific, gunnery school manning gun control stations. On 17 January, the destroyer escort, accompanied by French, sailed from Hawaiian waters for the Marshalls as escort for convoy PD-256-T—one transport and five attack transports. Reaching Eniwetok on 25 January, the destroyer escort remained there only briefly, getting underway for the Palaus the following day and convoying the same half-dozen ships she had shepherded from Hawaii. Detaching the transport Wharton to proceed independently to Ulithi Atoll, the convoy proceeded on, reaching its destination, Kossol Roads, on the last day of January.

Over the next several weeks, Alvin C. Cockrell escorted convoys between Eniwetok, Guam, Saipan, Ulithi, and Kossel Roads, and, when required, served as harbor patrol and air-sea rescue vessel. She carried out her first air-sea rescue mission on 23 February 1945, when she sailed from Ulithi to go to the assistance of a Martin PBM-3D Mariner flying boat from Patrol Bombing Squadron 22 that had been forced down by engine trouble. Underway at 1008, Alvin C. Cockrell proceeded at flank speed, guided to the scene by a "Dumbo" plane overhead.

She put her whaleboat over the side as she neared the Mariner, to take off the crew and attempt to take the aircraft in tow, and soon had seven of the nine enlisted men (two had remained on board to handle towlines), and the three officers from the crew on board. While the destroyer escort Manlove screened the operation, Alvin C. Cockrell managed to get the plane under tow by 0910 the following day, after which time the destroyer escort set out for Ulithi. Unfortunately, soon after the remaining crewmen from the plane were taken on board, the towline parted. Further attempts at salvage by Manlove proved fruitless and, ultimately, the Mariner (one wing of which had been damaged in the initial attempt to get a line to it) had to be sunk by gunfire.

The next instance of rescue occurred on 22 March 1945, while the ship was stationed on harbor entrance patrol at Apra Harbor, Guam. At 1540 on that day, Alvin C. Cockrell received orders to depart from her patrol station for an air-sea rescue mission 12 miles (19 km) from Orote Point. Once again guided by aircraft overhead, the destroyer escort spotted a life raft and its two occupants shortly before 1800, and by 1804 the ship had brought two members of the plane's crew. Transferring them to a picket boat sent out for that purpose, Alvin C. Cockrell then resumed patrolling her station.

In June, while at Kossol Passage, in the Palaus, she was directed to put to sea to search for reported airplane wreckage. In company with the destroyer escort Naifeh, she searched the assigned area on 14 June and the days following, but found nothing. A similar search conducted off Peleliu during the waning days of July 1945 also yielded no trace of downed planes or pilots reported in her vicinity.

The final month of the war, August 1945, began with Alvin C. Cockrell operating with the Palau Island Patrol and Escort Unit, keeping watch on the by-passed Palaus and the Japanese garrisons there. On 2 August, the ship departed her patrol station on orders to pick up two men from a raft reported by a patrol plane. The two turned out to be Japanese soldiers or laborers attempting to escape from Babelthuap and hoping for an American ship to pick them up. Alvin C. Cockrell turned them over to a small boat for transfer ashore, and resumed her patrol.

On 5 August, however, while operating in the Peleliu-Angaur antisubmarine screen, Alvin C. Cockrell received orders to proceed at full speed to the scene of the sinking of the heavy cruiser Indianapolis. She arrived in the area at 0600, and commenced a search in company with the destroyers Madison, Helm, and Ralph Talbot and the destroyer escort Dufilho. One flying boat orbited overhead.

With each ship proceeding to cover an assigned sector, Alvin C. Cockrell began finding grim evidence of the tragedy that had befallen the cruiser. She sighted two empty rubber rafts at 1007, and recovered an unidentified body at 1115, quickly burying it at sea. A half-hour later, at 1145, the ship spotted several other corpses—six of which were given a burial soon thereafter. Only one of the six was identifiable, and the advanced state of decomposition in all indicated that they had been dead for several days.

Many had life jackets, and a few had clothing. The destroyer escort sighted very little debris or wreckage by that point, and "no signs of any live survivors." Eventually ordered to break off the search and return to her regular operating base, Alvin C. Cockrell departed the area at 0622 on 6 August to return to Peleliu.

=== End-of-war activity ===
The end of the war in mid-August saw Alvin C. Cockrell still assigned local operations out of Peleliu. These lasted until 19 August, when she joined other units of Escort Division (CortDiv) 86 at Ulithi. She then proceeded to Okinawa for duty with the U.S. 3rd Fleet, reporting on 26 August.

Alvin C. Cockrell departed Buckner Bay on 9 September 1945, bound for Japan with Task Unit (TU) 56.5.2—one light cruiser, an escort carrier, a dock landing ship, two hospital ships, a seaplane tender and a United States Coast Guard cutter; three destroyer escorts (including Alvin C. Cockrell) and three fast transports (converted from destroyer escorts) rounded out the screen. Steaming for Wakanoura Wan to evacuate Allied prisoners of war (POWs), the task unit reached Kii Suido and entered Wakanoura Wan in the wake of the minesweeping group on 11 September. The task unit anchored at 1820 that day. With the completion of the evacuation—part of her ship's company serving on ashore during that time—on 15 September, the destroyer escort was assigned to Task Force 51 the same day.

After riding out a typhoon that swept through the area on 17 and 18 September, Alvin C. Cockrell operated as one of four destroyer escorts serving as the mine screen for the escort carriers Makin Island and Santee, as those ships' planes covered the occupation of Wakayama on 24 to 26 September. During this period, the destroyer escort sank two Japanese mines with gunfire.

Soon thereafter, Alvin C. Cockrell departed Wakanoura Wan in company with French and screening the escort carrier Siboney, putting to sea with a search group on 7 October to rendezvous with other ships looking for a PBM believed down at sea; among the Mariner's passengers was Rear Admiral William D. Sample, who was along on the flight to familiarize himself with the area. The special search mission continued on 8 October, and, with short breaks for refueling, continued over the ensuing days until the search was ordered abandoned on 17 October.

=== Occupation duties and decommissioning ===
Proceeding to Yokosuka, Japan, Alvin C. Cockrell stood out of that port on 24 October as part of the screen for Siboney and Puget Sound as the carriers' planes covered the occupation of Nagoya. The destroyer escort returned to Wakanoura Wan on 26 October, but sailed thence for Yokosuka the following day, arriving on the 28th. During November and December 1945, Alvin C. Cockrell served as courier ship between Yokosuka, Kure, and Wakayama, shuttling passengers and mail between those ports. She interrupted this routine briefly on 10 and 11 November when she operated with Siboney as the escort carrier conducted gunnery drills and flight training.

Relieved from duty with the 5th Fleet on 2 January 1946, Alvin C. Cockrell sailed for the United States. She touched briefly at Pearl Harbor on 14 January, and later proceeded thence to the west coast, reaching San Francisco, California, on 22 January. Decommissioned and placed in reserve at San Diego, California, on 2 July 1946, Alvin C. Cockrell remained inactive until returned to active duty with the buildup of the fleet during the Korean War.

=== Korean War ===
Recommissioned on 27 June 1951, Alvin C. Cockrell was assigned to Escort Squadron (CortRon) 3, and over the next two years served as a training ship for the Fleet Sonar School, San Diego. She conducted antisubmarine warfare (ASW) type-training exercises, and served as courier ship between San Diego and Long Beach, California.

Deploying to the western Pacific (WestPac) for the first time since the end of World War II, Alvin C. Cockrell sailed for the Far East in August 1953. She served as station ship at Hong Kong, for three months before she proceeded to the Philippine Islands and visited Sangley Point and Subic Bay. She also visited Bangkok, Thailand, during this deployment, and operated for two weeks in the Gulf of Siam, training sailors from the Thai Armed Forces Academy at Sattahip, in gunnery and engineering. Returning to San Diego by way of Guam, Midway Island, and Pearl Harbor, the destroyer escort reached San Diego in March 1954, and operated locally into the autumn of 1955. Her regular overhaul at the Long Beach Naval Shipyard, conducted during March and April 1955, punctuated that period of local operations, and saw the ship being converted for service as a flagship.

=== Deployed as CortRon 3 flagship ===
Deploying to the Far East again in October 1955, Alvin C. Cockrell was designated flagship of CortRon 3 in December 1955. During the course of this cruise, the ship participated in a wide variety of evolutions, ranging from hunter-killer exercises to covering U.S. Marine Corps amphibious landings and convoy escort duties. Her ports of call on this WestPac cruise encompassed Hong Kong, Keelung and Kaohsiung, Taiwan; Okinawa; and the Japanese ports of Atami, Sasebo and Yokosuka. Returning to San Diego at the end of March 1956, Alvin C. Cockrell spent the next nine months engaged in local operations out of that port, serving as sonar school ship and participating in several minor ASW training operations. Highlighting the latter period was the ship's participation in a fleet review at San Diego on 14 September 1956.

During 1957, Alvin C. Cockrell deployed to WestPac with CortRon 3, visiting the southern and western Pacific. During the course of this cruise, she visited Kwajalein Atoll, in the Marshalls; Auckland, New Zealand; Manus, in the Bismarck Archipelago; Yokosuka, Japan; Okinawa; Kaohsiung; Singapore; Hong Kong; Corregidor, Subic Bay, and Manila. She participated in exercise "Beacon Hill" in the Philippines; a SEATO (South East Asia Treaty Organization) exercise, "Astra", in the Gulf of Siam and South China Sea with units of the British, Australian, New Zealand, French, and Thai Navies; and spent a month on surveillance patrols in the Carolines, Marianas, and Bonins, visiting several islands famous in World War II: Guam, Ponape, Iwo Jima, Truk, Tinian, and Saipan. Returning to San Diego in early July, via Midway Island and Pearl Harbor, Alvin C. Cockrell underwent her regular overhaul at the Mare Island Naval Shipyard between October 1957 and January 1958.

For the first six months of 1958, the destroyer escort deployed to the central and western Pacific; her ports of call included Yokosuka, Hong Kong, and Subic Bay. She participated in a joint Air Force-Navy Operation Handclasp project, a U.S. 7th Fleet weapons demonstration for Asian political and military leaders, and spent two of the six months in the Carolines, Marianas, and Bonins, on surveillance patrol. She returned to San Diego in mid-June 1958, via Midway Island and Pearl Harbor as in previous deployments.

=== Reserve training and Berlin Crisis ===
After she had brought her fourth WestPac deployment to a close, Alvin C. Cockrell was assigned Naval Reserve Training (NRT) ship duties with Reserve Escort Squadron 1, on 1 July 1958, home-ported at San Francisco. Decommissioned on 17 January 1959, the ship was designated a Group II destroyer escort in the ASW surface component of the selected reserve and remained "in service" to provide underway training for her own selected reserve crew of inactive reserve officers and men. Two active duty officers and 36 enlisted men maintained the ship, and on the third weekend of each month, a reserve crew of 161 officers and men would embark to steam and train their own ship. For two weeks each year the reserve crew would embark, and, integrated with the active duty men, would carry out a two-week reserve training cruise. In May 1959, the ship moved to her new home port, the Naval and Marine Corps Reserve Training Center at Alameda, California.

For the next two years the ship maintained this routine, until the Berlin crisis in the autumn of 1961 resulted in a call-up of reserve units. In September 1961, President John F. Kennedy directed that all ASW surface components of the selected reserve forces report for active duty on 1 October 1961. Accordingly, Alvin C. Cockrell was recommissioned on 1 October 1961, Comdr. Robert A. Bush in command. After the ship underwent a routine overhaul, her home port was changed to Pearl Harbor. She sailed for Hawaii on 2 January 1962, and took part in a large-scale, opposed-entry exercise at Pearl Harbor ten days later.

Increased tensions in the Far East soon resulted in Alvin C. Cockrell's sailing for that area; following refresher training, the destroyer escort departed Hawaiian waters on 24 February 1962 with CortDiv 72, which consisted of Alvin C. Cockrell (flagship), and destroyer escorts Vammen, Marsh and Charles E. Brannon. Proceeding to Subic Bay via Guam and Midway Island, Alvin C. Cockrell reported for duty with Task Force 72 upon arrival at Subic on 11 March 1962.

=== Vietnam War ===
One week later, on 18 March, Alvin C. Cockrell sailed for Da Nang, Republic of Vietnam, for operations with units of the South Vietnamese Navy. She conducted intensive training assistance with units of that force, improving general ship-to-shore communications and providing on-the-job training for Vietnamese sailors.

Visiting Hong Kong from 5 to 11 April 1962, Alvin C. Cockrell then proceeded to Subic Bay, for tender availability alongside the repair ship Delta. Following that period of repairs and upkeep, the destroyer escort sailed for the Gulf of Siam, and conducted operations there between 20 April and 2 May. She conducted a four-day port visit to Saigon, the capital of South Vietnam, and then returned to Subic Bay. Alvin C. Cockrell ultimately sailed for Yokosuka on 21 May, and then participated in exercises the first week of June. Proceeding via Midway Island, the destroyer escort reached Pearl Harbor on 18 June 1962, and commenced a two-week availability alongside the destroyer tender Bryce Canyon.

=== Reserve duty and fate ===
Sailing thence for San Francisco, California, Alvin C. Cockrell reached her destination on 17 July 1962, and was decommissioned on 1 August 1962, reverting to "in service" status as a Group II NRT ship. She remained in that status for the rest of her career. During 1963 her two-week active training cruise took her to Hawaiian waters. In 1964 she conducted intensive refresher training at San Diego, California. The cruise for August 1965 found the ship visiting the Canadian ports of Vancouver and Esquimalt, British Columbia. In 1966 she operated out of San Diego. In the summer of 1967, the ship visited Vancouver and Seattle, Washington, in the course of her two-week cruise.

Decommissioned on 20 September 1968, Alvin C. Cockrell was struck from the Naval Vessel Register on 23 September 1968. Her hulk was subsequently utilized in weapons testing, and she was sunk on 19 September 1969.
