= Blues Mills, Nova Scotia =

Community in Nova Scotia, Canada

Coordinates: 45°55′58.82″N 61°10′45.94″W

Blues Mills in Nova Scotia

Blues Mills is a small community in the Canadian province of Nova Scotia, located in Inverness County on Cape Breton Island. The area is named after the miller Dugald Blue.

In 2017, the Boston Christmas Tree was donated by Bob and Marion Campbell of Blue's Mills.
