= Blue Mill Stream =

- Location of the mouth of Blue Mill Stream

Location
- Country: United States
- State: New York
- County: Delaware

Physical characteristics
- Source
  - coordinates: 41°54′20″N 75°14′16″W
- Mouth: Delaware River
  - coordinates: 41°52′49″N 75°15′28″W
  - elevation: 883 ft (269 m)

Blue Mill Stream is a river in Delaware County, New York. It flows through Black Ash Swamp before converging with the Delaware River west-northwest Lordville.
