= Oak Grove, Jackson County, Missouri =

- City
- Location within Jackson County
- Coordinates: 39°00′27″N 94°07′41″W
- Country: United States
- State: Missouri
- County: Jackson
- Incorporated: 1881

Area
  - Total: 6.43 sq mi (16.65 km^{2})
  - Land: 6.41 sq mi (16.60 km^{2})
  - Water: 0.019 sq mi (0.05 km^{2})
- Elevation: 863 ft (263 m)

Population (2020)
  - Total: 8,157
  - Density: 1,272.4/sq mi (491.28/km^{2})
- Time zone: UTC-6 (Central (CST))
  - Summer (DST): UTC-5 (CDT)
- FIPS code: 29-53624
- GNIS feature ID: 2395283
- Website: www.cityofoakgrove.com

Oak Grove is a city in Jackson and Lafayette counties in the U.S. state of Missouri. The population was 8,157 at the 2020 census. It is part of the Kansas City metropolitan area.

== History ==
A post office called Oak Grove has been in operation since 1840, however the town was originally called Lickskillet. The city was not platted until 1878. It was named for a grove of oak trees near the original town site.

=== 2017 tornado ===
On March 6, 2017, just before 9:00 pm CDT (03:00 UTC), a tornado touched down near the western edge of Oak Grove and tracked eastward across the city. 483 houses and 12 businesses were damaged, particularly between 25th and Broadway Streets across the southern part of the city. A total of fifteen people suffered injuries, but remarkably there were no fatalities. Communications were lost and power was knocked out to many areas. The National Weather Service rated the tornado EF3. Missouri Governor Eric Greitens declared a state of emergency for the area, and traveled to Oak Grove on March 7, where he visited first responders and tornado victims.

== Geography ==
According to the United States Census Bureau, the city has a total area of 6.19 square miles (16.03 km^{2}), of which 6.17 square miles (15.98 km^{2}) is land and 0.02 square miles (0.05 km^{2}) is water.

== Media ==
=== Print Media ===
Oak Grove has its own newspaper called "Focus on Oak Grove" the newspaper is owned by Spaar Publications LLC. Co-publishers are brothers, John and Joe Spaar. They also print the newspaper for the town of Odessa, that paper is called The Odessan.

=== Board Games ===
In the early 1980s an edition of the Monopoly board game that was themed around the town.

== Demographics ==
Historical population
| Census | Pop. | Note | %± |
|---|---|---|---|
| 1880 | 208 | | — |
| 1900 | 408 | | — |
| 1910 | 641 | | 57.1% |
| 1920 | 634 | | −1.1% |
| 1930 | 702 | | 10.7% |
| 1940 | 680 | | −3.1% |
| 1950 | 761 | | 11.9% |
| 1960 | 1,100 | | 44.5% |
| 1970 | 2,025 | | 84.1% |
| 1980 | 4,067 | | 100.8% |
| 1990 | 4,565 | | 12.2% |
| 2000 | 5,535 | | 21.2% |
| 2010 | 7,795 | | 40.8% |
| 2020 | 8,157 | | 4.6% |
U.S. Decennial Census

=== Racial and ethnic composition ===
Oak Grove city, Missouri – Racial and ethnic composition Note: the US Census treats Hispanic/Latino as an ethnic category. This table excludes Latinos from the racial categories and assigns them to a separate category. Hispanics/Latinos may be of any race.
| Race / Ethnicity (NH = Non-Hispanic) | Pop 2000 | Pop 2010 | Pop 2020 | % 2000 | % 2010 | % 2020 |
|---|---|---|---|---|---|---|
| White alone (NH) | 5,335 | 7,195 | 6,995 | 96.39% | 92.30% | 85.75% |
| Black or African American alone (NH) | 14 | 82 | 143 | 0.25% | 1.05% | 1.75% |
| Native American or Alaska Native alone (NH) | 14 | 55 | 32 | 0.25% | 0.71% | 0.39% |
| Asian alone (NH) | 23 | 54 | 55 | 0.42% | 0.69% | 0.67% |
| Native Hawaiian or Pacific Islander alone (NH) | 11 | 9 | 4 | 0.20% | 0.12% | 0.05% |
| Other race alone (NH) | 2 | 1 | 17 | 0.04% | 0.01% | 0.21% |
| Mixed race or Multiracial (NH) | 44 | 113 | 547 | 0.79% | 1.45% | 6.71% |
| Hispanic or Latino (any race) | 92 | 286 | 364 | 1.66% | 3.67% | 4.46% |
| Total | 5,535 | 7,795 | 8,157 | 100.00% | 100.00% | 100.00% |

=== 2010 census ===
As of the census of 2010, there were 7,795 people, 2,791 households, and 2,068 families living in the city. The population density was 1,263.4 inhabitants per square mile (487.8/km^{2}). There were 2,990 housing units at an average density of 484.6 per square mile (187.1/km^{2}). The racial makeup of the city was 94.7% White, 1.1% African American, 0.8% Native American, 0.7% Asian, 0.1% Pacific Islander, 0.8% from other races, and 1.8% from two or more races. Hispanic or Latino of any race were 3.7% of the population.

There were 2,791 households, of which 44.3% had children under the age of 18 living with them, 51.1% were married couples living together, 15.8% had a female householder with no husband present, 7.2% had a male householder with no wife present, and 25.9% were non-families. 21.1% of all households were made up of individuals, and 9.1% had someone living alone who was 65 years of age or older. The average household size was 2.76 and the average family size was 3.16.

The median age in the city was 32.4 years. 30.6% of residents were under the age of 18; 8.8% were between the ages of 18 and 24; 28.3% were from 25 to 44; 20.4% were from 45 to 64; and 11.8% were 65 years of age or older. The gender makeup of the city was 48.5% male and 51.5% female.

=== 2000 census ===
As of the census of 2000, there were 5,535 people, 1,944 households, and 1,479 families living in the city. The population density was 1,140.3 inhabitants per square mile (440.3/km^{2}). There were 2,016 housing units at an average density of 415.3 per square mile (160.3/km^{2}). The racial makeup of the city was 97.07% White, 0.25% African American, 0.25% Native American, 0.42% Asian, 0.20% Pacific Islander, 0.76% from other races, and 1.05% from two or more races. Hispanic or Latino of any race were 1.66% of the population.

There were 1,944 households, out of which 45.1% had children under the age of 18 living with them, 57.9% were married couples living together, 13.3% had a female householder with no husband present, and 23.9% were non-families. 20.2% of all households were made up of individuals, and 8.7% had someone living alone who was 65 years of age or older. The average household size was 2.80 and the average family size was 3.21.

In the city the population was spread out, with 31.8% under the age of 18, 8.7% from 18 to 24, 32.3% from 25 to 44, 17.3% from 45 to 64, and 9.8% who were 65 years of age or older. The median age was 31 years. For every 100 females, there were 95.0 males. For every 100 females age 18 and over, there were 87.9 males.

The median income for a household in the city was $44,952, and the median income for a family was $49,136. Males had a median income of $35,644 versus $25,238 for females. The per capita income for the city was $17,738. About 8.3% of families and 10.1% of the population were below the poverty line, including 11.2% of those under age 18 and 7.2% of those age 65 or over.

== Education ==
Most of Oak Grove in Jackson County is in the Oak Grove R-VI School District, while a small part is in the Grain Valley R-V School District. In regards to Lafayette County, a portion of Oak Grove there is in the Oak Grove school district, while another is in the Odessa R-VII School District.

The Oak Grove R-VI School District operates one primary school, one elementary school, one middle school, and Oak Grove High School.

Metropolitan Community College has the Oak Grove and Grain Valley school districts in its in-district taxation area. The Odessa school district is in MCC's out of district service area but not its in-district taxation area.

Oak Grove has a public library, a branch of the Mid-Continent Public Library.
