= Sni-A-Bar Creek =

Stream in the U.S. state of Missouri

Sni-A-Bar Creek (/ˈsnaɪ.ə.bɑːr/ SNY-ə-bar) is a stream in Jackson and Lafayette counties in the U.S. state of Missouri. It is a tributary of the Missouri River.

The stream headwaters arise in southwest Lafayette County at 38°55′53″N 94°05′53″W and the stream flows southwest into Jackson County. The stream turns north three miles north of Lone Jack. It continues to the north passing under Interstate 70 just east of Grain Valley. It then turns to the northeast and passes back into Lafayette County. It crosses under Missouri Route 131, U.S. Route 24, and Missouri Route 224 south and east of Wellington. It enters the Missouri River about one mile northeast of Wellington at 39°08′26″N 93°58′08″W.

Sni-A-Bar is possibly a corruption of chenail Hubert (French pronunciation: [ʃənaj ybɛʁ]), meaning "Hubert channel/slough" in French. Alternatively, the name may have come from a French frontiersman named Abar who was charting a course on the Missouri River in the early 1800s.

Alternate names include Big Sni-A-Bar Creek, Sni-A-Bar River, and Sniabar Creek. Alexander Majors, one of the founders of the Pony Express, called the creek Big Snye Bear River in his book Seventy Years on the Frontier.

== See also ==
- List of rivers of Missouri
