= Jackson County, Missouri =

County in Missouri, United States

- County
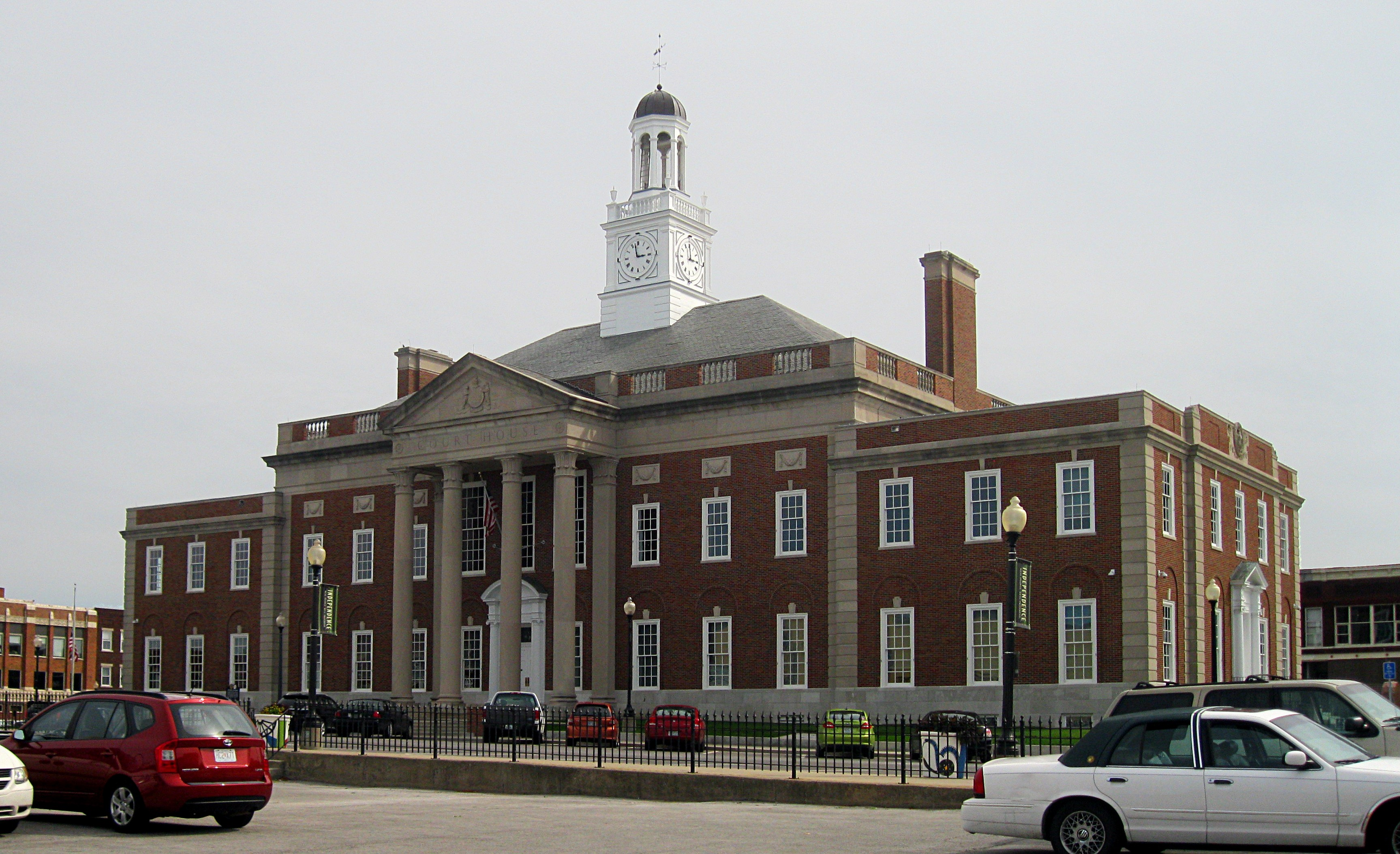
- The Jackson County Courthouse in Independence

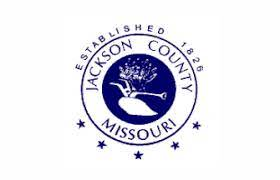
- Flag Seal

- Location within the U.S. state of Missouri
- Coordinates: 39.01°N 94.34°W
- Country: United States
- State: Missouri
- Founded: December 15, 1826
- Named for: Andrew Jackson
- Seat: Independence and Kansas City
- Largest city: Kansas City

Area
  - Total: 616 sq mi (1,600 km^{2})
  - Land: 604 sq mi (1,560 km^{2})
  - Water: 12 sq mi (31 km^{2}) 1.9%

Population (2020)
  - Total: 717,204
  - Estimate (2025): 732,994 ▲
  - Density: 1,190/sq mi (458/km^{2})
- Time zone: UTC−6 (Central)
  - Summer (DST): UTC−5 (CDT)
- Congressional districts: 4th, 5th, 6th
- Website: www.jacksongov.org

Jackson County is located in the western portion of the U.S. state of Missouri, on the border with Kansas. As of the 2020 census, the population was 717,204. making it the second-most populous county in the state (after St. Louis County in the east). The county seats are Independence and Kansas City, making Jackson County one of 33 U.S. counties with more than one county seat. The county was organized December 15, 1826, and named for former Tennessee senator Andrew Jackson, who became President of the United States in 1829.

== History ==
=== Early years ===
Jackson County was long home to members of the indigenous Osage tribe, who occupied this territory at the time of European encounter. The first known European explorers were French trappers who used the Missouri River as a highway for explorations and trading with regional Native American tribes. Jackson County was claimed as a part of the territory of New France, until 1763 and the British victory in the French and Indian War. After that, France ceded this territory west of the Mississippi River to Great Britain's ally, Spain. In 1800 Spain was forced by France in the Third Treaty of San Ildefonso to return its Louisiana Territory (of which modern Jackson County formed a part) to France. Soon abandoning its claims in North America, Napoleon of France sold the territory to the United States in the Louisiana Purchase of 1803.

Operating on behalf of President Thomas Jefferson, explorers Meriwether Lewis and William Clark passed through Jackson County on their notable Lewis and Clark Expedition in 1804, to survey peoples, property and resources of the Louisiana Territory. Among other items, their report indicated a "high, commanding position" along the river within the current boundaries of Jackson County; in 1808 Fort Osage was constructed there. This stockade and trading post was one of the first U.S. military installations within the Louisiana Purchase territory, and remained active until 1822.

In 1821, Jackson County was included in the newly admitted state of Missouri. Jackson County was organized on December 15, 1826, and named for Andrew Jackson, U.S. Senator from Tennessee and military hero of the War of 1812, who would ascend to the Presidency shortly after, in 1829. Its county seat was designated as Independence, then a minuscule settlement near a spring. However, the rapid increase in westward exploration and expansion ultimately resulted in Independence becoming the starting point for three of the great Westward Trails: the Santa Fe Trail, the Oregon Trail, and the California Trail. Following the American Civil War and construction of railroads through this area, nearby Kansas City, Missouri, ultimately eclipsed Independence, though both towns remain county seats.

In 1838, the "Town Company" bought a small piece of land along the Missouri River in northern Jackson County, establishing "Westport Landing" (today this is known as the River Market district). The area outside Westport Landing was renamed in 1839 as the "Town of Kansas", after the local Kanza or Kaw tribe.

The town was chartered by Jackson County in 1850 and incorporated by the State of Missouri in 1853 as the "City of Kansas". In 1889, with a population of around 60,000, the city adopted a new charter and changed its name to Kansas City. In 1897, Kansas City annexed Westport.

=== Latter Day Saints ===
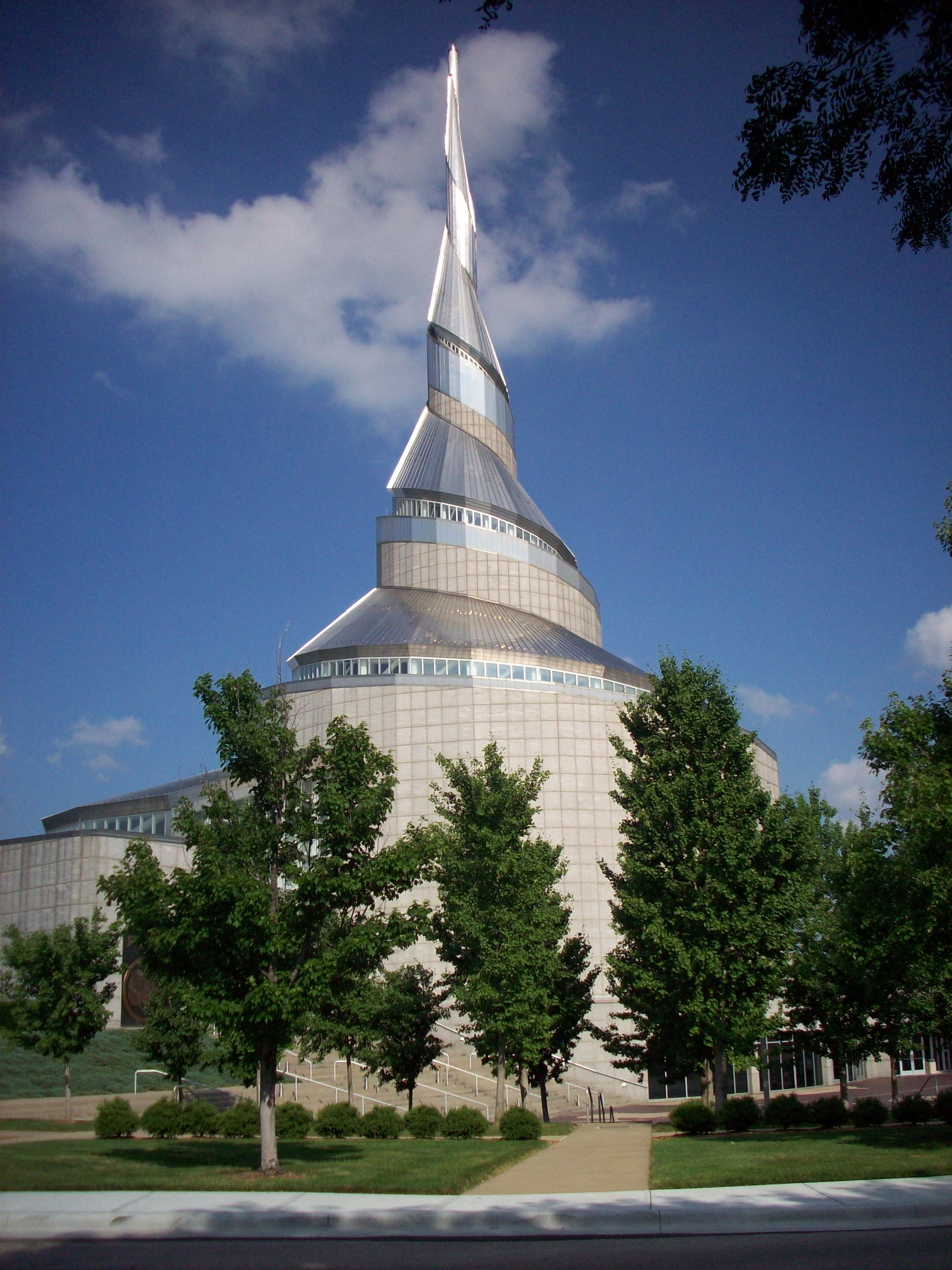
Community of Christ Temple in Independence, Missouri, USA. Dedicated 1994

Jackson County figures prominently in the history of the Church of Jesus Christ of Latter Day Saints, also known as Mormons. The Church was formed in Palmyra, New York, in 1830, located in Western New York, north of the Finger Lakes Region. March 1831 President Joseph Smith said that a location on the Missouri–Kansas border was to be the latter-day "New Jerusalem" with the "center place" located in Independence, the county seat. Traveling to the area in the summer of 1831, Smith and some associates formally proclaimed Jackson County as the site in a ceremony in August 1831.

Leadership and members of the Church began moving to Jackson County soon after but open conflict with earlier settlers ensued, driven by religious and cultural differences. Many early settlers along the Missouri River had come from the upper South: Kentucky and Tennessee, for instance, and brought their slaves and pro-slavery customs with them. They believed that the "Yankee" Mormons, from New York and northern states, were abolitionists.

Mobs in the public and private sector used force to drive individual Saints from Jackson to nearby counties within Missouri and put Latter Day Saints on notice that they had until November 6, 1833, to leave the county en masse. On November 23, 1833, the few remaining LDS residents were ordered to leave Jackson County. By mid-1839, following the Missouri Mormon War, the Mormons were driven from the state altogether. They did not return to Jackson County or Missouri in significant numbers until 1867, two years after the end of the Civil War.

=== Civil War ===
During the Civil War, Jackson County was the scene of several engagements, the most notable of which was the Battle of Westport in 1864, sometimes referred to as "the Gettysburg of Missouri". The Union victory here firmly established Northern control of Missouri, and led to the failure of Confederate General Sterling Price's Missouri expedition. Other noteworthy battles were fought in Independence in 1862, Lone Jack a few days later, and again in Independence in 1864.

Jackson County was strongly affected by Union General Thomas Ewing's infamous General Order No. 11 (1863). With large numbers of Confederate sympathizers living within its boundaries, and active Confederate operations in the area a frequent occurrence, the Union command was determined to deprive Confederate bushwhackers of all local support. Ewing's decree practically emptied the rural portions of the county, and resulted in the burning of large portions of Jackson and adjacent counties.

According to American artist George Caleb Bingham, who described the order as "imbecilic" and was a resident of Kansas City at the time, one could see the "dense columns of smoke arising in every direction", symbolic of what he termed "a ruthless military despotism which spared neither age, sex, character, nor condition". Because of the destruction carried out under the order, its legacy haunted Jackson County for decades after the war.

=== Twentieth century ===
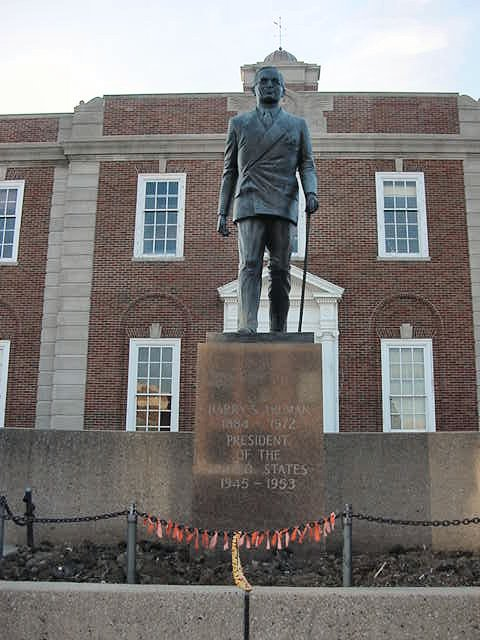
Harry S. Truman statue in Independence, Missouri

The coming of the railroads and the building of stockyards led to the rapid expansion of Kansas City in the late 19th century. During the 1920s and '30s, the city became a noted center for Jazz and Blues music, as well as the headquarters of Hallmark Cards and the site of Walt Disney's first animation studio. The county fared better than many during the Great Depression, as local political boss Thomas Pendergast worked to implement a $50,000,000 public works project that provided thousands of jobs.

One of Pendergast's political protegés was a young World War I veteran from Independence, Harry S. Truman, who had been his nephew's commanding officer in the war. Truman was elected Presiding Judge (equivalent to a County Executive) of Jackson County with Pendergast support in 1926. He later was elected as a U.S. Senator from Missouri, Vice President and, in 1945, following the death of Franklin D. Roosevelt, succeeded him to become the thirty-third President of the United States. Truman was also elected president in 1948 in his own right.

Following World War II, developers followed new highways and created subdivisions for new housing, which increasingly encroached on rural portions of the county. They provided housing for the nation's returning veterans and their young families. Independence, Blue Springs and Lee's Summit underwent growth during this period, which continues to the present. Kansas City, on the other hand, suffered problems of urban decay as jobs and families left the industrial city, problems common to many large American cities in the late 20th century.

Recent building projects have sought to reverse this trend, including work on the city's famous City Market, Westport district, 18th and Vine Historic District, and most recently, the Kansas City Power & Light District.

In 2024, the statues of Andrew Jackson were voted about whether to remove as to not idolize a slave owner or not. The plaques added in 2021 to the statues to hopefully add context and support for keeping the statues, wording it acknowledge Jackson was a slave owner and also supported the Indian Removal Act.

Some of the county's local history is presented at the Pleasant Hill Historical Society Museum, in Pleasant Hill on the southern edge of the county.

== Geography ==
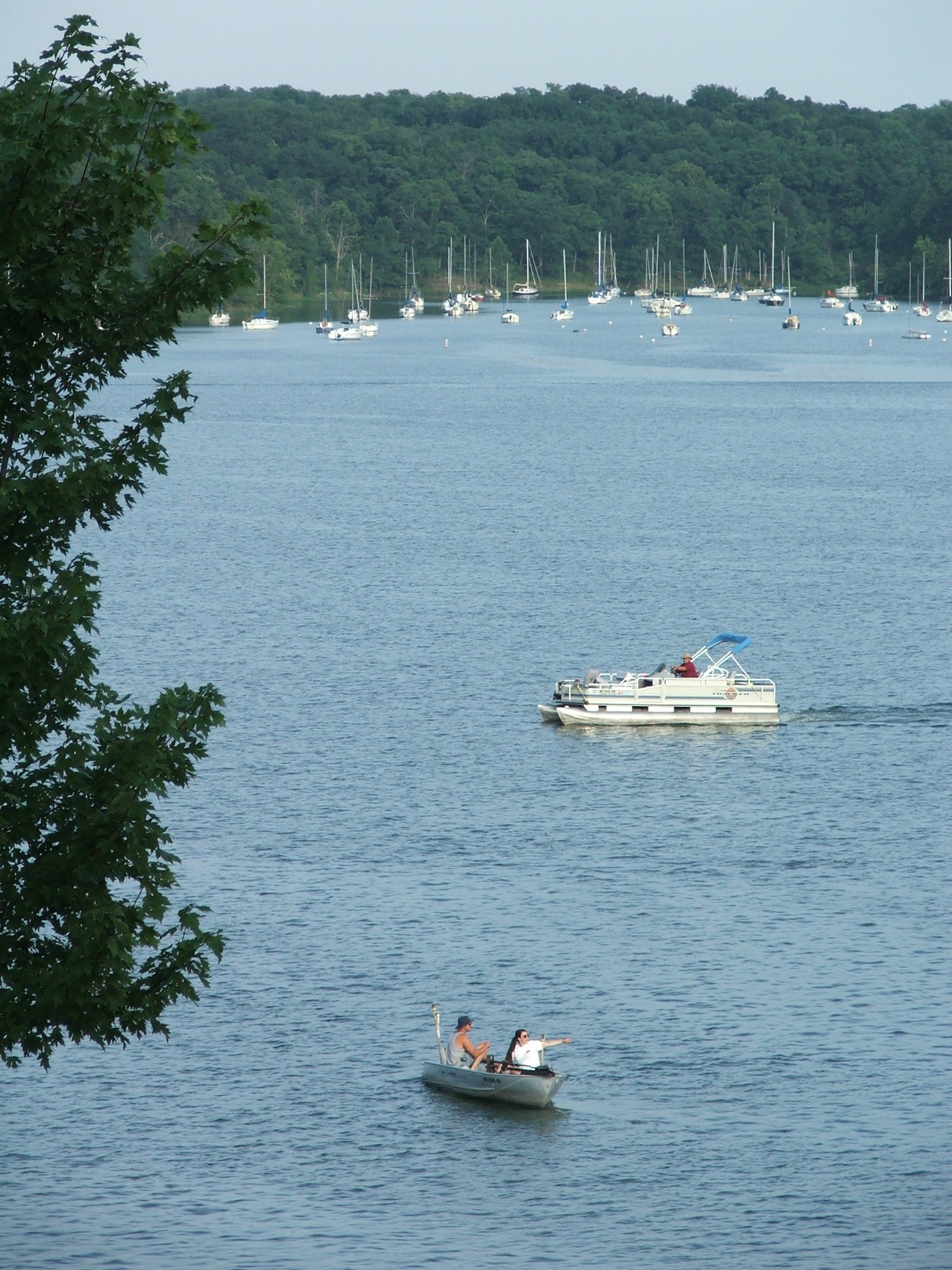
Lake Jacomo

According to the United States Census Bureau, the county has a total area of 616 square miles (1,600 km^{2}), of which 604 square miles (1,560 km^{2}) is land and 12 square miles (31 km^{2}) (1.9%) is water.

Notable lakes include

- Blue Springs Lake
- Lake Jacomo
- Lake Lotawana
- Lake Tapawingo
- Longview Lake
- Prairie Lee Lake

The Missouri River comprises Jackson County's northern border, with the exception of one small portion north of the river around the intersection of Highways 210 and 291 and all of the 291 bridge. The county has historically been a major traveling point for American river travel.

== Communities ==
=== Cities ===
- Blue Springs
- Buckner
- Grain Valley
- Grandview
- Greenwood
- Independence (co-county seat)
- Kansas City (partly in Platte and Clay counties and a small part in Cass County; co-county seat)
- Lake Lotawana
- Lake Tapawingo
- Lee's Summit
- Levasy
- Lone Jack
- Oak Grove
- Pleasant Hill (Mostly Cass County, but partly in Jackson County)
- Raytown
- Sugar Creek

=== Villages ===
- River Bend
- Sibley
- Unity Village

=== Census-designated places ===
- Blue Summit
- Tarsney Lakes

=== Unincorporated communities ===
- Atherton
- Blue Mills
- Cockrell
- Courtney
- Hiler
- Hicks City
- Pink Hill
- Sni Mills

=== Adjacent counties ===
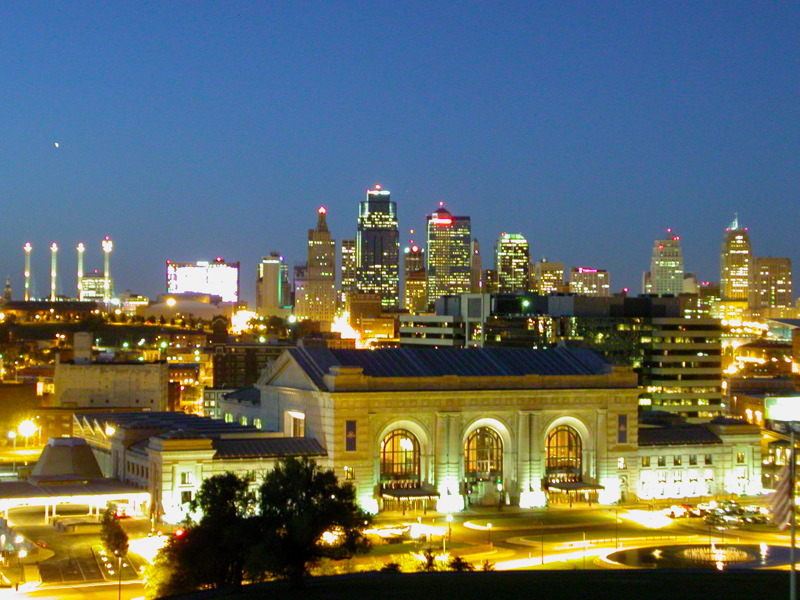
Downtown Kansas City, Missouri, at twilight

- Johnson County, Kansas (west/southwest)
- Clay County, Missouri (north)
- Wyandotte County, Kansas (west/northwest)
- Cass County, Missouri (south)
- Lafayette County, Missouri (east)
- Ray County (northeast)
- Johnson County, Missouri (southeast)—not part of the Kansas City metropolitan area

Jackson County is one of the few counties in the US to border two counties of the same name in different states (Johnson County, Kansas, and Johnson County, Missouri).

=== National protected area ===
- Harry S. Truman National Historic Site

== Demographics ==
Historical population
Census	Pop.	Note	%±
1830	2,823		—
1840	7,612		169.6%
1850	14,000		83.9%
1860	22,913		63.7%
1870	65,011		183.7%
1880	82,825		27.4%
1890	160,510		93.8%
1900	195,193		21.6%
1910	283,522		45.3%
1920	367,846		29.7%
1930	470,454		27.9%
1940	477,828		1.6%
1950	541,035		13.2%
1960	622,732		15.1%
1970	654,558		5.1%
1980	629,266		−3.9%
1990	633,232		0.6%
2000	654,880		3.4%
2010	674,158		2.9%
2020	717,204		6.4%
2025 (est.)	732,994	▲	2.2%
U.S. Decennial Census; 1790-1960 1900-1990; 1990-2000 2010-2020

=== 2020 census ===
In the 2020 census, the county had a population of 717,204 and a median age of 36.8 years. 22.7% of residents were under the age of 18 and 15.3% of residents were 65 years of age or older. For every 100 females there were 94.3 males, and for every 100 females age 18 and over there were 91.9 males age 18 and over.

There were 297,580 households in the county, of which 28.0% had children under the age of 18 living with them and 32.3% had a female householder with no spouse or partner present. About 33.5% of all households were made up of individuals and 11.2% had someone living alone who was 65 years of age or older. There were 329,579 housing units, of which 9.7% were vacant. Among occupied housing units, 56.5% were owner-occupied and 43.5% were renter-occupied. The homeowner vacancy rate was 1.8% and the rental vacancy rate was 10.4%.

Of residents, 95.7% lived in urban areas, while 4.3% lived in rural areas.

The racial makeup of the county was 60.8% White, 22.1% Black or African American, 0.6% American Indian and Alaska Native, 2.1% Asian, 0.3% Native Hawaiian and Pacific Islander, 5.0% from some other race, and 9.1% from two or more races. Hispanic or Latino residents of any race comprised 10.8% of the population.

=== Racial and ethnic composition ===
Jackson County, Missouri – Racial and ethnic composition Note: the US Census treats Hispanic/Latino as an ethnic category. This table excludes Latinos from the racial categories and assigns them to a separate category. Hispanics/Latinos may be of any race.
Race / Ethnicity (NH = Non-Hispanic)	Pop 1980	Pop 1990	Pop 2000	Pop 2010	Pop 2020	% 1980	% 1990	% 2000	% 2010	% 2020
White alone (NH)	479,663	470,011	443,427	426,574	419,542	76.23%	74.22%	67.71%	63.28%	58.50%
Black or African American alone (NH)	125,077	134,828	151,333	159,442	156,542	19.88%	21.29%	23.11%	23.65%	21.83%
Native American or Alaska Native alone (NH)	2,273	2,825	2,775	2,668	2,713	0.36%	0.45%	0.42%	0.40%	0.38%
Asian alone (NH)	4,476	6,145	8,307	10,621	14,981	0.71%	0.97%	1.27%	1.58%	2.09%
Native Hawaiian or Pacific Islander alone (NH)	x	x	1,093	1,492	1,727	x	x	0.17%	0.22%	0.24%
Other race alone (NH)	1,285	533	894	846	3,083	0.20%	0.08%	0.14%	0.13%	0.43%
Mixed race or Multiracial (NH)	x	x	11,891	16,081	40,831	x	x	1.82%	2.39%	5.69%
Hispanic or Latino (any race)	16,492	18,890	35,160	56,434	77,785	2.62%	2.98%	5.37%	8.37%	10.85%
Total	629,266	633,232	654,880	674,158	717,204	100.00%	100.00%	100.00%	100.00%	100.00%

Racial / Ethnic Profile of places in Jackson County (2020 Census)
Following is a table of cities, villages, and census designated places in Jackson County, Missouri. Data for the United States (with and without Puerto Rico), the state of Missouri, and Jackson County itself have been included for comparison purposes.
The majority racial/ethnic group is coded per the key below. Communities that extend into and adjacent county or counties are delineated with a ‡ followed by an accompanying explanatory note. The full population of each community has been tabulated including the population in adjacent counties.

Majority minority with no dominant group
Majority White
Majority Black
Majority Hispanic
Majority Asian

Racial and ethnic composition of places in Jackson County (2020 Census) (NH = Non-Hispanic) Note: the US Census treats Hispanic/Latino as an ethnic category. This table excludes Latinos from the racial categories and assigns them to a separate category. Hispanics/Latinos may be of any race.
Place	Designation	Total Population	White alone (NH)	%	Black or African American alone (NH)	%	Native American or Alaska Native alone (NH)	%	Asian alone (NH)	%	Pacific Islander alone (NH)	%	Other race alone (NH)	%	Mixed race or Multiracial (NH)	%	Hispanic or Latino (any race)	%
United States of America (50 states and D.C.)	x	331,449,281	191,697,647	57.84%	39,940,338	12.05%	2,251,699	0.68%	19,618,719	5.92%	622,018	0.19%	1,689,833	0.51%	13,548,983	4.09%	62,080,044	18.73%
United States of America (50 states, D.C., and Puerto Rico)	x	334,735,155	191,722,195	57.28%	39,944,624	11.93%	2,252,011	0.67%	19,621,465	5.86%	622,109	0.19%	1,692,341	0.51%	13,551,323	4.05%	65,329,087	19.52%
Missouri	State	6,154,913	4,663,907	75.78%	692,774	11.26%	23,496	0.38%	132,158	2.15%	9,293	0.15%	22,377	0.36%	307,840	5.00%	303,068	4.92%
Jackson County	County	717,204	419,542	58.50%	156,542	21.83%	2,713	0.38%	14,981	2.09%	1,727	0.24%	3,083	0.43%	40,831	5.69%	77,785	10.85%
Blue Springs	City	58,603	44,912	76.64%	4,475	7.64%	233	0.40%	864	1.47%	111	0.19%	177	0.30%	3,929	6.70%	3,902	6.66%
Buckner	City	2,945	2,553	86.69%	16	0.54%	13	0.44%	4	0.14%	0	0.00%	3	0.10%	241	8.18%	115	3.90%
Grain Valley	City	15,627	12,926	82.72%	426	2.73%	60	0.38%	152	0.97%	14	0.09%	38	0.24%	989	6.33%	1,022	6.54%
Grandview	City	26,209	10,477	39.97%	9,902	37.78%	112	0.43%	411	1.57%	40	0.15%	119	0.45%	1,691	6.45%	3,457	13.19%
Greenwood	City	6,021	5,043	83.76%	282	4.68%	11	0.18%	31	0.51%	5	0.08%	7	0.12%	351	5.83%	291	4.83%
Independence	City	123,011	85,754	69.71%	10,345	8.41%	609	0.50%	1,444	1.17%	796	0.65%	507	0.41%	8,514	6.92%	15,042	12.23%
Kansas City ‡	City	508,090	268,273	52.80%	130,983	25.78%	1,854	0.36%	15,793	3.11%	1,456	0.29%	2,366	0.47%	26,396	5.20%	60,969	12.00%
Lake Lotawana	City	2,310	2,083	90.17%	30	1.30%	4	0.17%	17	0.74%	4	0.17%	13	0.56%	95	4.11%	64	2.77%
Lake Tapawingo	City	794	728	91.69%	6	0.76%	5	0.63%	1	0.13%	0	0.00%	7	0.88%	27	3.40%	20	2.52%
Lee's Summit	City	101,108	78,003	77.15%	8,886	8.79%	232	0.23%	2,372	2.35%	142	0.14%	379	0.37%	5,696	5.63%	5,398	5.34%
Levasy	City	77	66	85.71%	0	0.00%	0	0.00%	1	1.30%	0	0.00%	2	2.60%	6	7.79%	2	2.60%
Lone Jack	City	1,492	1,301	87.20%	15	1.01%	9	0.60%	16	1.07%	0	0.00%	3	0.20%	96	6.43%	52	3.49%
Oak Grove	City	8,157	6,995	85.75%	143	1.75%	32	0.39%	55	0.67%	4	0.05%	17	0.21%	547	6.71%	364	4.46%
Pleasant Hill ‡	City	8,777	7,786	88.71%	58	0.66%	46	0.52%	31	0.35%	3	0.03%	28	0.32%	465	5.30%	360	4.10%
Raytown	City	30,012	15,443	51.46%	9,718	32.38%	119	0.40%	326	1.09%	61	0.20%	148	0.49%	1,869	6.23%	2,328	7.76%
Sugar Creek	City	3,271	2,521	77.07%	120	3.67%	22	0.67%	23	0.70%	17	0.52%	14	0.43%	230	7.03%	324	9.91%
River Bend	Village	3	3	100.00%	0	0.00%	0	0.00%	0	0.00%	0	0.00%	0	0.00%	0	0.00%	0	0.00%
Sibley	Village	314	294	93.63%	0	0.00%	1	0.32%	2	0.64%	0	0.00%	2	0.64%	8	2.55%	7	2.23%
Unity Village	Village	66	49	74.24%	6	9.09%	1	1.52%	2	3.03%	0	0.00%	1	1.52%	4	6.06%	3	4.55%
Blue Summit	CDP	658	371	56.38%	20	3.04%	8	1.22%	2	0.30%	1	0.15%	2	0.30%	30	4.56%	224	34.04%
Tarsney Lakes	CDP	250	216	86.40%	2	0.80%	1	0.40%	0	0.00%	1	0.40%	0	0.00%	24	9.60%	6	2.40%

The most reported ancestries in 2020 were:

- German (17.3%)
- English (16.4%)
- African American (13.8%)
- Irish (13.8%)
- Mexican (7.4%)
- Italian (3.3%)
- Scottish (2.9%)
- French (2.2%)
- Polish (1.2%)
- Swedish (1.2%)

=== 2010 census ===
In the 2010 census Jackson County had a population of 674,158. The racial and ethnic makeup of the population was 63.3% non-Hispanic white, 23.7% non-Hispanic black, 0.5% Native American, 1.6% Asian, 0.4% Pacific Islander alone or in combination with one or more other races, 0.1% non-Hispanic from some other race, 3.8% reporting two or more races and 8.4% Hispanic or Latino.

=== 2000 census ===
As of the census of 2000, there were 654,880 people, 266,294 households, and 166,167 families residing in the county. The population density was 1,083 inhabitants per square mile (418/km^{2}). There were 288,231 housing units at an average density of 476 per square mile (184/km^{2}). The racial makeup of the county was 70.10% White, 23.27% Black or African American, 0.48% Native American, 1.28% Asian, 0.18% Pacific Islander, 2.43% from other races, and 2.25% from two or more races. 5.37% of the population were Hispanic or Latino of any race. 16.7% were of German, 9.1% American, 8.9% Irish and 8.8% English ancestry.

There were 266,294 households, out of which 29.90% had children under the age of 18 living with them, 43.40% were married couples living together, 14.70% had a female householder with no husband present, and 37.60% were non-families. Of all households, 31.20% were made up of individuals, and 9.90% had someone living alone who was 65 years of age or older. The average household size was 2.42 and the average family size was 3.05.

25.80% were aged under 18, 9.10% were aged from 18 to 24, 31.10% from 25 to 44, 21.50% from 45 to 64, and 12.50% who were 65 years of age or older. The median age was 35 years. For every 100 females, there were 92.90 males. For every 100 females age 18 and over, there were 89.00 males.

The median income for a household in the county was $39,277, and the median income for a family was $48,435. Males had a median income of $35,798 versus $27,403 for females. The per capita income for the county was $20,788. About 9.00% of families and 11.90% of the population were below the poverty line, including 16.40% of those under age 18 and 8.70% of those age 65 or over.

=== Religion ===
According to the Association of Religion Data Archives County Membership Report (2010), Jackson County is sometimes regarded as being on the northern edge of the Bible Belt, with evangelical Protestantism being the most predominant religion. The most predominant denominations among residents in Jackson County who adhere to a religion are Roman Catholics (19.51%), Southern Baptists (17.96%), and non-denominational evangelical Christians (11.52%).

== Government ==
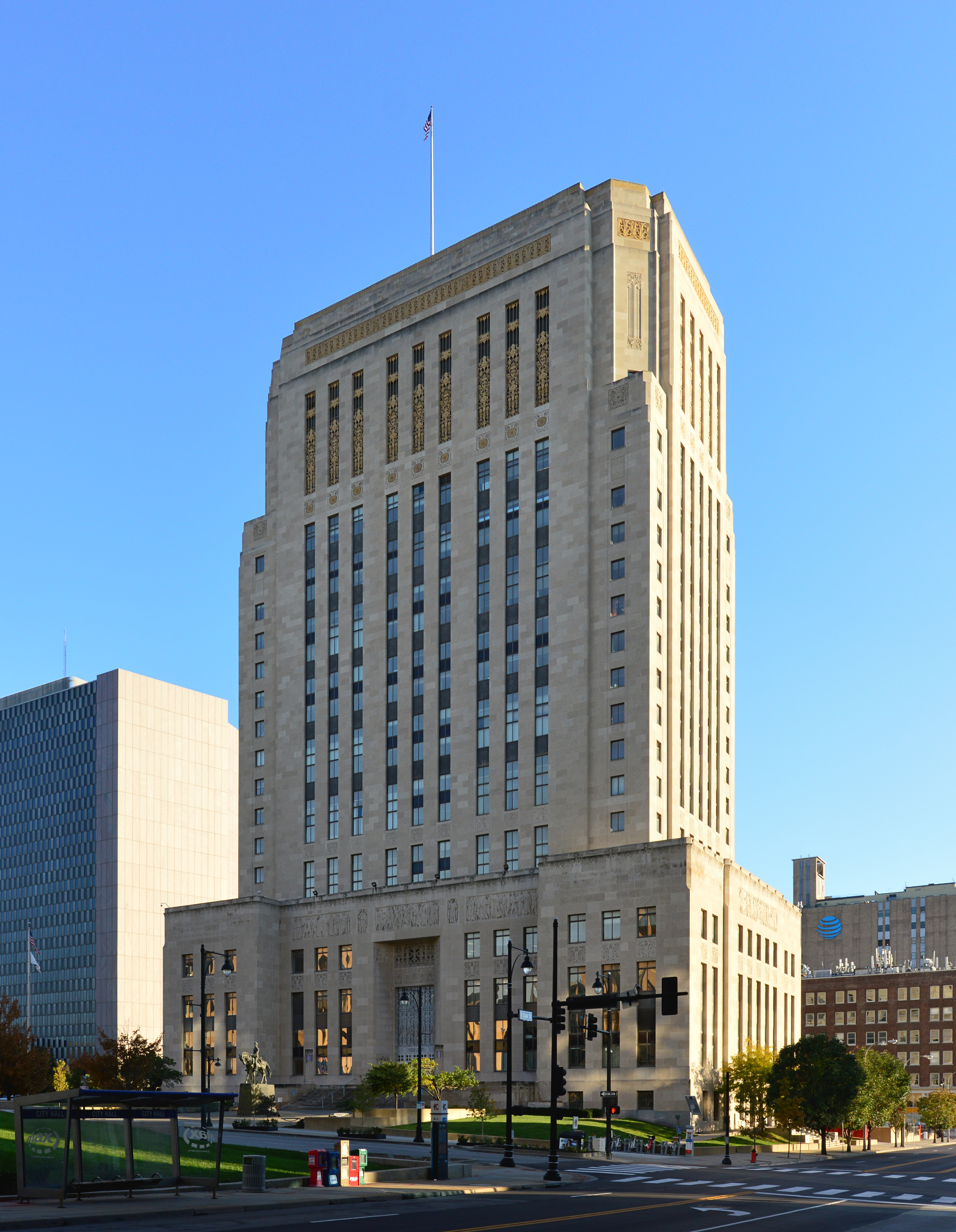
The Jackson County 16th Circuit courthouse in Kansas City

Jackson County was the second county to adopt a home-rule charter under the Missouri Constitution. The Jackson County Charter was adopted by the voters in 1970 and was amended in 1985 and 1986.

Executive power of the county is vested in the county executive, which is a full-time salaried position. The county executive is elected at-large by the general population of the county for a four-year term, but may be recalled by referendum.

The County Prosecutor is a full-time salaried position elected at-large by the general population of the county for a four-year term

Ordinances are passed by a county legislature. The legislature is made up of nine members: six are elected from smaller, single-member districts within the county. Three are elected "at large" from larger districts, each by voters of the whole county. Member terms are four years, beginning on January 1 following the election.

Position	Name	Party	First Elected
Executive	Phil LeVota	Democratic	2025
Prosecutor	Melesa Johnson	Democratic	2025
Sheriff	Darryl Forté	Democratic	2018
At-large Legislator	Jalen Anderson	Democratic	2018
At-large Legislator	Donna Peyton	Democratic	2022
At-large Legislator	Megan Marshall	Democratic	2022
Legislator District 1	Manny Abarca IV	Democratic	2022
Legislator District 2	Venessa Huskey	Democratic	2022
Legislator District 3	Charlie Franklin	Democratic	2018
Legislator District 4	DaRon McGee	Democratic	2022
Legislator District 5	Jeanie Lauer	Republican	2018
Legislator District 6	Sean Smith	Republican	2022

There are 244,570 registered voters.

=== Law enforcement ===
The County Sheriff is a full-time salaried position elected by the general population of the county for a four-year term As of 2021 the sheriff is Darryl Forté. The Sheriff's Office is also responsible for the county's jail.

Sheriff Mike Sharp resigned in April 2018 amidst scandal. He was the subject of a lawsuit that alleged sexual misconduct, personal use of public funds and sexual harassment. Sheriff Darryl Forté was then appointed. He had recently retired as the chief of the Kansas City Police Department. He was elected to a full term in November of that year.

In mid-2019, Sheriff Forté directed a more-restrictive policy on high-speed pursuits the day after one of his deputies was charged with injuring a bystander during such a chase in May 2018.

=== Courts ===
Jackson County is the only county that falls under the jurisdiction of the 16th Judicial Circuit of the Missouri Circuit Courts. The Court seats 19 Circuit Judges and 10 Associate Circuit Judges. All Judges of the court are appointed by the Governor of Missouri, Circuit Judges serve a term of six years and Associate judges serve a term of four years.

As of February 10, 2021:

Members of the 16th Circuit Court

Judges	Year Appointed	Appointed by	Term ends
Presiding Judge Jalilah Otto	2017	Eric Greitens (R)	2024
Judge Justine E. Del Muro	1993	Mel Carnahan (D)	2024
Judge Marco A. Roldan	1999	Mel Carnahan (D)	2024
Judge John M. Torrence	2001	Bob Holden (D)	2026
Judge Joel P. Fahnestock	2009	Matt Blunt (R)	2028
Judge J. Dale Youngs	2009	Jay Nixon (D)	2028
Judge James F. Kanatzar	2011	Jay Nixon (D)	2024
Judge Charles H. McKenzie	2011	Jay Nixon (D)	2024
Judge Kevin D. Harrell	2012	Jay Nixon (D)	2026
Judge Patrick W. Campbell	2013	Jay Nixon (D)	2026
Judge Kenneth R. Garrett III	2013	Jay Nixon (D)	2026
Judge S. Margene Burnett	2013	Jay Nixon (D)	2028
Judge Bryan E. Round	2014	Jay Nixon (D)	2028
Judge Jennifer M. Phillips	2015	Jay Nixon (D)	2028
Judge Mark A. Styles, Jr.	2016	Jay Nixon (D)	2024
Judge Cory L. Atkins	2019	Mike Parson (R)	2026
Judge Adam L. Caine	2020	Mike Parson (R)	2028
Judge Sarah A. Castle	2020	Mike Parson (R)	2028
Judge Jerri J. Zhang	2021	Mike Parson (R)	2028
Associate Judge Twila K. Rigby	1997	Mel Carnahan (D)	2026
Associate Judge Jeffrey L. Bushur	2000	Mel Carnahan (D)	2026
Associate Judge Mary F. Weir	2013	Jay Nixon (D)	2026
Associate Judge Jeffrey C. Keal	2013	Jay Nixon (D)	2024
Associate Judge Janette K. Rodecap	2014	Jay Nixon (D)	2024
Associate Judge Susan E. Long	2015	Jay Nixon (D)	2026
Associate Judge Kyndra J. Stockdale	2019	Mike Parson (R)	2024
Associate Judge R. Travis Willingham	2019	Mike Parson (R)	2026
Associate Judge Jessica Agnelly	2020	Mike Parson (R)	2026
Associate Judge Kea S. Bird-Riley	2020	Mike Parson (R)	2026

Jackson County also has a municipal court with one judge. The Municipal Judge is appointed by the County Executive with approval by the County Legislature and they serve a four-year term.

== Politics ==
United States presidential election results for Jackson County, Missouri
Year	Republican		Democratic		Third party(ies)	
Year	No.	%	No.	%	No.	%
1888	14,350	46.64%	15,663	50.91%	752	2.44%
1892	11,044	39.02%	15,825	55.90%	1,438	5.08%
1896	18,711	46.94%	20,705	51.94%	446	1.12%
1900	21,581	47.74%	22,542	49.87%	1,083	2.40%
1904	25,794	53.16%	20,582	42.42%	2,145	4.42%
1908	26,998	45.18%	31,461	52.65%	1,301	2.18%
1912	5,618	8.89%	32,209	50.97%	25,367	40.14%
1916	32,943	41.68%	44,556	56.38%	1,530	1.94%
1920	79,875	50.49%	76,791	48.54%	1,548	0.98%
1924	91,141	51.79%	76,002	43.19%	8,839	5.02%
1928	126,589	56.59%	96,703	43.23%	385	0.17%
1932	83,214	32.39%	172,456	67.13%	1,215	0.47%
1936	79,119	26.79%	215,120	72.84%	1,080	0.37%
1940	101,568	42.46%	137,285	57.39%	366	0.15%
1944	95,406	45.51%	113,803	54.29%	423	0.20%
1948	86,471	38.17%	139,186	61.44%	870	0.38%
1952	133,093	48.88%	138,792	50.97%	412	0.15%
1956	122,182	47.78%	133,522	52.22%	0	0.00%
1960	123,589	46.38%	142,869	53.62%	0	0.00%
1964	78,766	32.81%	161,290	67.19%	0	0.00%
1968	91,086	39.22%	112,154	48.30%	28,980	12.48%
1972	129,989	58.34%	92,830	41.66%	0	0.00%
1976	101,401	43.07%	130,120	55.27%	3,920	1.66%
1980	106,156	41.36%	135,805	52.91%	14,726	5.74%
1984	132,271	49.48%	135,067	50.52%	0	0.00%
1988	107,810	42.02%	147,964	57.67%	793	0.31%
1992	78,611	26.96%	145,999	50.06%	67,027	22.98%
1996	85,534	34.26%	140,317	56.20%	23,807	9.54%
2000	104,418	38.38%	160,419	58.96%	7,225	2.66%
2004	130,500	41.30%	183,654	58.12%	1,839	0.58%
2008	124,687	36.75%	210,824	62.14%	3,755	1.11%
2012	122,708	39.32%	183,953	58.95%	5,400	1.73%
2016	116,211	38.14%	168,972	55.46%	19,504	6.40%
2020	126,535	37.99%	199,842	60.00%	6,686	2.01%
2024	125,610	39.50%	187,026	58.81%	5,381	1.69%

Jackson County is a solidly Democratic county and has remained so even as most other parts of the state of Missouri have trended rightward. The last Republican presidential candidate to carry the county was Richard Nixon in 1972, the only Republican to do so since 1932. John Ashcroft was the last Republican gubernatorial candidate in 1988 and Kit Bond for the Senate in 1998. Tom Schweich is the last Statewide Republican candidate to win the county in his landslide victory for State Auditor in 2014.

The county's Democratic lean is due almost entirely to the presence of Kansas City. In 2008, for example, John McCain barely carried the areas of the county outside Kansas City, but Barack Obama carried Kansas City by a nearly 3-to-1 margin, enough for him to carry the county as a whole with 62 percent of the vote.

== Economy ==
The total employment as of September 2024 is 1,142,105.

== Transportation ==
=== Major highways ===
- Interstate 29
- Interstate 35
- Interstate 49
- Interstate 70
- Interstate 70 Alternate
- Interstate 435
- Interstate 470
- Interstate 670
- U.S. Route 24
- U.S. Route 24 Bus.
- U.S. Route 40
- U.S. Route 50
- U.S. Route 56
- U.S. Route 71
- U.S. Route 169
- Route 7
- Route 9
- Route 12
- Route 78
- Route 150
- Route 210
- Route 291
- Route 350

=== Transit ===
- RideKC
- KC Streetcar
- Kansas City Area Transportation Authority
- Amtrak at Kansas City Union Station
- Greyhound Lines and Jefferson Lines at Kansas City Bus Station

== Education ==
=== K–12 schools ===
School districts include:

- Blue Springs R-IV School District
- Center 58 School District
- Fort Osage R-I School District
- Grain Valley R-V School District
- Grandview C-4 School District
- Hickman Mills C-1 School District
- Independence 30 School District
- Kansas City 33 School District
- Lee's Summit R-VII School District
- Lone Jack C-6 School District
- Oak Grove R-VI School District
- Raytown C-2 School District

=== Colleges and universities ===
Metropolitan Community College has its taxation area in all parts of the county except for the one in the Lone Jack C-6 school district; in that portion, it is in the college's service area, but not the in-district taxation zone.

=== Archives ===
- Jackson County Historical Society

=== Libraries ===
- Kansas City Public Library
- Linda Hall Library
- Mid-Continent Public Library

=== Museums ===
- American Jazz Museum
- Fort Osage National Historic Landmark
- Harry S Truman National Historic Site
- Harry S. Truman Library and Museum
- Jackson County Jail and Marshal's House
- Kansas City Museum
- Kemper Museum of Contemporary Art
- Missouri Town 1855
- National Toy and Miniature Museum
- National World War I Museum and Memorial
- Negro Leagues Baseball Museum
- Nelson-Atkins Museum of Art
- Owens-Rogers Museum
- Vaile Mansion

== See also ==
- Kaw Township, Jackson County, Missouri
- List of counties in Missouri
- National Register of Historic Places listings in Jackson County, Missouri
