= List of schools in the Kansas City metropolitan area =

This is a list of universities, colleges, seminaries, and schools (and their school districts) in Kansas City, Missouri and the surrounding Kansas City metropolitan area. School districts included: Independence, North Kansas City, Park Hill, Kansas City, Kansas, Kansas City, Missouri, Belton, Hickman Mills, Oak Grove, Liberty, Platte County, Raymore-Peculiar and Raytown, Missouri.

== Universities and colleges ==
- Army Command and General Staff College, Fort Leavenworth, Ks.
- Avila University, Catholic university of the Sisters of St. Joseph of Carondelet, Kansas City, Mo.
- Baker University, branch of School of Professional and Graduate Studies (Overland Park, KS)
- Benedictine College Founded 1858. Only Catholic College in America with a Nobel Prize winning graduate. Atchison, Ks.
- Calvary University, Founded 1932, Kansas City, Mo.
- Columbia College, a private co-educational liberal arts university.
- DeVry University, Kansas City, Mo.
- Donnelly College, Two-year Catholic college founded in 1949, located in Kansas City, Ks.
- Friends University Kansas City Area Center, master's degree programs including Master of Science in Family Therapy, Lenexa, Ks.
- Graceland University, Independence, Mo.
- Johnson County Community College, Overland Park, Ks.
- Kansas Christian College, Overland Park, Ks.
- Kansas City Art Institute, four-year college of fine arts and design founded in 1885, Kansas City, Mo.
- Kansas City Kansas Community College, 2-year college, Kansas City, Ks.
- Kansas City University of Medicine and Biosciences, Kansas City, Mo.
- Kansas State University, Olathe, Ks.
- Metropolitan Community College), a 2-year college with several branches in the Kansas City, Mo. metropolitan area.
- MidAmerica Nazarene University, a 4-year private Nazarene liberal-arts university, Olathe, KS
- Ottawa University, Overland Park, Ks.
- Park University, Parkville, Independence, Lenexa, and downtown Kansas City, Mo.
- Rockhurst University, a notable Jesuit university founded in 1910, Kansas City, Mo.
- Rasmussen College, Overland Park, Ks.
- University of Kansas, Edwards Campus, Overland Park, Ks.
- University of Kansas Medical Center - Kansas City, Ks; branch of the University of Kansas (in nearby Lawrence, KS) that focuses on medical education.
- Saint Luke's College of Health Sciences, Kansas City Missouri.
- University of Missouri, Kansas City, Mo, one of four University of Missouri campuses, serving more than 14,000 undergraduates
- University of Saint Mary, Leavenworth, Ks
- Webster University, Kansas City, Mo, founded in 1915, in Kansas City since 1972. Evening programs for adult learners
- William Jewell College, Liberty, Mo.

== Seminaries ==
- Midwestern Baptist Theological Seminary, Southern Baptist Convention, Kansas City, Missouri.
- Nazarene Theological Seminary, Church of the Nazarene, Kansas City, Missouri.
- Calvary University, Kansas City, Missouri.
- Saint Paul School of Theology, Methodist, Leawood, Kansas.
- Expositors Seminary, TES, Kansas City, Missouri.

== High schools ==
- Academie Lafayette International High School (KCMO)
- Archbishop O'Hara High School (KCMO)
- Afrikan Centered Education Collegium Campus (KCMO)
- The Barstow School
- Belton High (Belton)
- Bishop Miege High School
- Bishop Ward High School (KCKS)
- Blue Springs High School (Blue Springs)
- Blue Springs South High School (Blue Springs)
- Center High School (C58)
- Central High (KCMO)
- Christ Prep Academy (Lenexa, KS)
- East High (KCMO)
- F.L. Schlagle High School (KCKS)
- Fort Osage High School (KCMO)
- Frontier School of Excellence-High School (KCMO)
- Frontier STEM High School (KCMO)
- Grain Valley High School (Grain Valley, Missouri)
- J.C. Harmon High (KCKS)
- Kalos Christian Academy (KCMO)
- Kansas City Academy (MO)
- Kansas City Christian School (KS)
- Kearney High School (Kearney, Missouri)
- Lee's Summit High School (Lee's Summit)
- Lee's Summit North High School (Lee's Summit)
- Lee's Summit West High School (Lee's Summit)
- Liberty High School (Liberty, Missouri) (Liberty)
- Liberty North High (Liberty)
- Lincoln College Preparatory Academy (KCMO)
- Maranatha Christian Academy (Shawnee)
- Maur Hill - Mount Academy (Founded 1863) (Benedictine Order) (Atchison, KS)
- Northeast High (KCMO)
- North Kansas City High (NKCSD)
- Northland Christian (KCMO)
- Notre Dame de Sion (KCMO)
- Oak Grove High (Oak Grove)
- Oak Park High (NKSCD)
- Overland Christian Schools (Overland Park, KS)
- Park Hill High (Park Hill)
- Park Hill South High (Park Hill)
- Paseo Academy (KCMO)
- Platte County High School (Platte County)
- Plaza Heights Christian Academy (Blue Springs)
- Raymore-Peculiar High School (Raymore & Peculiar towns)
- Raytown Senior High School (Raytown)
- Raytown South High (Raytown)
- The Pembroke Hill School (KCMO)
- Piper High School (KCKS)
- Refine KC (KCMO)
- Rockhurst High School (KCMO)
- Ruskin High School, Kansas City, Mo
- St. Michael the Archangel Catholic High School (Lee's Summit, MO)
- St. Thomas Aquinas High School (Overland Park, Kansas)
- Southeast High (KCMO)
- Southwest Early College Campus (KCMO)
- St. James Academy (Lenexa, KS)
- St. Pius X High School (KCMO)
- St. Teresa's Academy (KCMO)
- Staley High (NKCSD)
- Summit Christian Academy (Lee’s Summit)
- Sumner Academy of Arts & Science (KCKS)
- Truman High (Independence)
- University Academy Charter School (Kansas City, MO)
- Turner High School (KCKS)
- Van Horn High (Independence)
- Washington High School (KCKS)
- Westport High (KCMO)
- Whitefield Academy (KCMO)
- William Chrisman High (Independence)
- Winnetonka High (NKCSD)
- Wyandotte High (KCKS)

== Middle schools ==
- Academie Lafayette (KCMO)
- Afrikan Centered Education Collegium Campus (KCMO)
- Antioch Middle (NKCSD)
- Argentine Middle (KCKS)
- Arrowhead Middle (KCKS)
- Belton Middle (Belton)
- Bernard C. Campbell (Lee's Summit)
- Bingham Middle (Independence)
- Bridger Middle (Independence)
- Brittany Hill Middle (Blue Springs)
- Center Middle School (C58)
- Central Middle (KCKS)
- Christ the King (KCKS)
- Congress Middle (Park Hill)
- Coronado Middle (KCKS)
- Delta Woods Middle (Blue Springs)
- Discovery Middle (Liberty)
- Eisenhower Middle (KCKS)
- Eastgate 6th Grade Center (NKCSD)
- Gateway 6th Grade Center (NKCSD)
- Grandview Middle (Grandview)
- Heritage Middle (Liberty)
- Kalos Christian Academy (KCMO)
- Kansas City Academy (MO)
- Kansas City Middle School of the Arts (KCMO)
- Lakeview Middle (Park Hill)
- Liberty Middle (Liberty)
- Lincoln College Preparatory Academy (KCMO)
- Maple Park Middle (NKCSD)
- Moreland Ridge Middle (Blue Springs)
- New Mark Middle (NKCSD)
- Northgate Middle (NKCSD)
- Northland Christian (KCMO)
- Northeast Middle School (KCMO)
- Northwest Magnet Middle (KCKS)
- Nowlin Middle (Independence)
- Oak Grove Middle (Oak Grove)
- Osage Trail Middle (Ft. Osage-Independence)
- Overland Christian Schools (Overland Park, KS)
- Paul Kinder Middle (Blue Springs)
- Pioneer Ridge Middle (Independence)
- Platte City Middle School (Platte County)
- Plaza Middle (Park Hill)
- Pleasant Lea Middle (Lee's Summit)
- Raymore-Peculiar East Middle (Raymore)
- Raymore-Peculiar South Middle (Raymore) Opens in 2017
- Raytown Middle (Raytown)
- Raytown Central (Raytown)
- Raytown South (Raytown)
- Refine KC (KCMO)
- The Pembroke Hill School (KCMO)
- Rosedale Middle (KCKS)
- South Valley Middle School (Liberty)
- Smith-Hale Middle (Hickman Mills-KCMO)
- Summit Lakes Middle (Lee's Summit)
- Southwest Early College Campus (KCMO)
- University Academy Charter School (Kansas City, MO)
- Walden Middle (Park Hill)
- West Middle (KCKS)
- Whitefield Academy

== Elementary schools ==
- Academie Lafayette (KCMO)
- Afrikan Centered Education Collegium Campus (KCMO)
- Alexander Doniphan Elementary School (Liberty)
- Boone Elementary School (C58)
- Briarcliff Elementary (NKCSD)
- Benton Elementary (Independence)
- Bell Prairie Elementary (NKCSD)
- Cambridge Elementary School (Belton)
- Center Elementary School (C58)
- Chinn Elementary (Park Hill)
- Chouteau Elementary (NKCSD)
- Christian Ott Elementary (Independence)
- Emerson Elementary (KCKS)
- Douglass Elementary (KCKS)
- English Landing Elementary (Park Hill)
- Fox Hill Elementary (NKCSD)
- Fairmount Elementary (Independence)
- Franklin Elementary School (Liberty)
- Gashland Elementary (NKCSD)
- Gladden Elementary (Belton)
- Gracemor Elementary (NKCSD)
- Graden Elementary (Park Hill)
- Hazel Grove Elementary]] (KCKS)
- Hawthorn Elementary (Park Hill)
- Hopewell Elementary (Park Hill)
- Indian Creek Elementary School (C58)
- Kalos Christian Academy (KCMO)
- Kellybrook Elementary School (Liberty)
- Kentucky Trail Elementary School (Belton)
- Lewis and Clark Elementary School (Liberty)
- Liberty Oaks Elementary School (Liberty)
- Lillian Schumacher Elementary School (Liberty)
- Linden West Elementary (NKCSD)
- Line Creek Elementary (Park Hill)
- Manor Hill Elementary School (Liberty)
- Maple Elementary (Oak Grove)
- Maplewood Elementary (NKCSD)
- Nashua Elementary School (NKCSD)
- New Stanley Elementary (KCKS)
- Northland Christian (KCMO)
- Overland Christian Schools (Overland Park, KS)
- The Pembroke Hill School (KCMO)
- Prairie Point Elementary (Park Hill)
- Ravenwood Elementary (NKCSD)
- Red Bridge Academy
- Red Bridge Elementary School (C58)
- Refine KC School (KCMO)
- Regency Place Elementary School (Olathe)
- Renner Elementary (Park Hill)
- Ridgeview Elementary School (Liberty)
- Rising Hill Elementary (NKCSD)
- St. Paul's Episcopal Day School), (Westport)
- Santa Fe Trail Elementary (Independence)
- Scott Educational Center (Belton)
- Shoal Creek Elementary School (Liberty)
- St. Patrick School (Kansas City, MO)
- Southeast Elementary (Park Hill)
- Sugar Creek Elementary (Independence)
- Three Trails Elementary (Independence)
- Tiffany Ridge Elementary (Park Hill)
- Topping Elementary (NKCSD)
- University Academy Charter School (Kansas City, MO)
- Union Chapel Elementary (Park Hill)
- Warren Hills Elementary School (Liberty)
- Whitefield Academy
- Whittier Elementary (KCKS)
- Wilckens STEAM Academy at Hillcrest (Belton)
