= Bill Myles =

College football coach and administrator

Personal information
- Born: November 21, 1936; Kansas City, Missouri
- Died: May 12, 2020 (aged 83); Columbus, Ohio

Career information
- High school: Lincoln High School, Kansas City, Missouri
- College: Drake University

Career history

Coaching
- Manual High School (1962) Assistant Coach; Lincoln High School (1963-1964) Assistant Coach; Lincoln High School (1965-1968) Head coach; Southeast High School (1969-1972) Head coach; University of Nebraska (1972-1977) Assistant Coach; Ohio State (1977-1984) Assistant Coach

Operations
- Ohio State Athletics Department (1984-2007); Associate Athletic Director

Awards and highlights
- Coached in 13 Bowl Games; Coached 8 All-American Players; 2nd Black Football Coach ever for University of Nebraska; 3rd Black Football Coach ever for Ohio State

William “Bill” Myles (21 November 1936 - 12 May 2020) was a former high school and college football coach and college sports administrator.

== Early life ==
Bill Myles graduated from Lincoln High School in Kansas City, Missouri in 1954. Myles's performance at Lincoln (7 varsity letters in football, basketball, and track & field) earned him a football scholarship to Drake University, which he entered in the fall of 1954.

== College career ==
Myles played football for Drake University from 1954 to 1957. After his college football eligibility expired, Myles left Drake and returned to Kansas City. After working for 5 years in Kansas City and at the urging of family and friends, Myles returned to Drake University to finish his bachelor's degree in education in 1962. Later, Myles earned a master's degree from Central Missouri State University in 1967.

== High School Coaching Career ==
After graduating from Drake in 1962, Myles was hired as an assistant football and basketball coach at Manual High School in Kansas City, Missouri. In his first season at Manual in 1962, Myles helped the team to their first win in 18 years. In the 1963 season, despite Myles being transferred to Lincoln, Manual won the Interscholastic League football championship.

In 1965, after serving the prior two seasons as an assistant, Myles was hired as head coach at Lincoln High School in Kansas City, Missouri where he coached through the 1968 season.

In the spring of 1969, Myles was hired as head coach at Southeast High School in Kansas City, Missouri replacing Cecil Patterson. Myles coached the Southeast Knights from 1969 through 1972.

== College Coaching Career ==
On March 4, 1972, Myles was hired as an assistant coach of the University of Nebraska freshmen football team by Head Coach Bob Devaney. At Nebraska, Myles replaced Bill Thornton who had left to join the NFL's St. Louis Cardinals as an offensive backfield coach. Preceded only by Thornton, Myles was the second black coach in the history of the Nebraska football program. After serving as freshman assistant coach in 1972, Myles was promoted to offensive line coach in 1973 under new head coach Tom Osborne. In 1975, Osborne promoted Myles to linebackers coach (working with Husker defensive coordinator Monte Kiffin), a position he held until leaving for Ohio State after the 1976 season.

During his stint at Nebraska, the Cornhuskers won two Big 8 Conference football titles (1972 and 1975) and played in 5 bowls (1973 Orange Bowl, 1974 Cotton Bowl, 1974 Sugar Bowl, 1975 Fiesta Bowl, 1976 Astro-Bluebonnet Bowl). Myles also coached five All-American offensive linemen (Daryl White, Marvin Crenshaw, Rik Bonness, Tom Davis, and Kelvin Clark).

In March 1977, Myles was hired by Ohio State football head coach Woody Hayes as an offensive line coach. Myles was the third black coach hired by Ohio State preceded only by Rudy Hubbard (served from 1968 to 1973) and Mickey Jackson (served from 1974 to 1979).

After Woody Hayes was fired by Ohio State after the 1978 Gator Bowl in Myles’ second season, Myles was retained by new head coach Earle Bruce. In addition to Myles, among the other coaches on Bruce's first Ohio State coaching staff were former Seattle Seahawks head coach Pete Carroll, former University of Kansas and University of Minnesota head coach Glen Mason, and former Marshall and Navy head coach George Chaump.

Myles served as an assistant coach at Ohio State until retiring from coaching after the 1984 season. During his Buckeye coaching career, Myles coached Ohio State in eight bowl games (1978 Sugar Bowl, 1978 Gator Bowl, 1980 Rose Bowl, 1980 Fiesta Bowl, 1981 Liberty Bowl, 1982 Holiday Bowl, 1984 Fiesta Bowl, 1985 Rose Bowl). Myles also coached 3 Ohio State football All-American offensive linemen. (Chris Ward, Ken Fritz, and Jim Lachey).

== College Administrative Career ==
After the 1984 Ohio State football season, Myles was hired to an administrative role at Ohio State as an associate athletic director. Myles held that position for 22 years until retiring in 2007. During his tenure as an administrator, Ohio State football won eight Big 10 titles, appeared in 19 bowl games, and won the 2002 National Championship.

== Honors ==
- Drake University National Distinguished Alumni Award winner
- Earned the Drake University “Double D” Award in 1981. Awarded to former Drake athletes for achievements in their professions and or community service since earning their degree from Drake.
- First African American to win the Ohio Gold Award, given by the Columbus, Ohio Chapter of the National Football Foundation in 1998.

== Personal life ==
In 2012, Myles worked with Steve Davis to write the book, “Myles Traveled - My American Journey,” a biography about his life, released in 2014.
