= Manual High School =

Manual High School can refer to several different high schools:

- Manual High School (Peoria, Illinois)
- Manual High School (Denver)
- Manual High School (Kansas City)
- duPont Manual High School in Louisville, Kentucky
- Emmerich Manual High School in Indianapolis, Indiana
- Manual Training High School in New York City, later renamed John Jay High School and now the site of the John Jay Educational Campus (Brooklyn)
- Northeast Manual Training School, a high school from 1903 to 2009 in Philadelphia
- Stivers Manual Training High School, now Stivers School for the Arts, in Dayton, Ohio
