= Jeff Floyd =

American football coach

Playing career
- 1975–1978: William Jewell

Coaching career (HC unless noted)
- 1980–1983: Truman State (assistant)
- 1984–1987: Osceola HS (MO)
- 1988–1996: Central Missouri State (DC)
- 1996: Central Missouri State (interim HC)
- 1997–2000: William Jewell
- 2010–2012: Truman HS (MO)

Head coaching record
- Overall: 17–25 (college)

Jeff Floyd is an American former football coach. He served as the interim head football coach at Central Missouri State University for the final three games of 1996 season and as the head football coach at William Jewell College in Liberty, Missouri from 1997 to 2000, compiling a career college football coaching record of 17–25.

Floyd was the defensive coordinator at Central Missouri State until he was named interim head coach following the dismissal of Terry Noland.

== Head coaching record ==
=== College ===
Year	Team	Overall	Conference	Standing	Bowl/playoffs
Central Missouri State Mules (Mid-America Intercollegiate Athletics Association) (1996)
1996	Central Missouri State	1–2 (Note: Terry Noland served as head coach for the first eight games of the 1996 season before resigning. Floyd served as interim head coach for the final three games. Central Missouri State finished the season with an overall record of 4–7 and a mark of 2–7 in Mid-America Intercollegiate Athletics Association play.)	1–2	8th	
Central Missouri State:		1–2	1–2		
William Jewell Cardinals (Heart of America Athletic Conference) (1997–2000)
1997	William Jewell	5–5	5–4	T–4th	
1998	William Jewell	3–7	3–6	8th	
1999	William Jewell	5–4	5–4	T–5th	
2000	William Jewell	3–7	3–6	T–6th	
William Jewell:		16–23	16–20		
Total:		17–25			
