= Dwork =

Dwork is a surname. Notable people with the surname include:

- Bernard Dwork (1923–1998), mathematician;
- Cynthia Dwork (born 1958), computer scientist;
- Debórah Dwork, historian;
- Johnny Dwork (born 1959), flying disc freestyle athlete, author, event producer, and artist;
- Melvin Dwork (1922–2016), American interior designer and LGBT activist.
