= Blue Summit, Missouri =

- Census-Designated Place
- Interactive map of Blue Summit, Missouri
- Coordinates: 39°05′13″N 94°28′52″W
- Country: United States
- State: Missouri
- County: Jackson

Area
  - Total: 0.49 sq mi (1.26 km^{2})
  - Land: 0.49 sq mi (1.26 km^{2})
  - Water: 0 sq mi (0.00 km^{2})

Population (2020)
  - Total: 658
  - Density: 1,350/sq mi (521.3/km^{2})
- ZIP code: 64126
- Area codes: 816 and 975
- FIPS code: 29-06670

Blue Summit is an unincorporated community and census-designated place (CDP) lodged between Kansas City and Independence in Jackson County, Missouri, United States. It is part of the Kansas City metropolitan area. As of the 2020 census, Blue Summit had a population of 658.

It is located in the Independence School District, and is zoned to Korte Elementary, Nowlin Middle School, and Van Horn High School. It was previously in the Kansas City, Missouri School District, where it was zoned to West Rock Creek Elementary School, Nowlin Middle School, and Van Horn High School.

Metropolitan Community College has the Independence school district in its taxation area.

The community is served by Missouri Route 78, Missouri Route 12 and Interstate 435.

== Demographics ==
Historical population
Census	Pop.	Note	%±
2020	658		—
U.S. Decennial Census

Blue Summit first appeared as a census designated place in the 2020 U.S. census.

Blue Summit CDP, Missouri – Racial and ethnic composition Note: the US Census treats Hispanic/Latino as an ethnic category. This table excludes Latinos from the racial categories and assigns them to a separate category. Hispanics/Latinos may be of any race.
Race / Ethnicity (NH = Non-Hispanic)	Pop 2020	2020
White alone (NH)	371	56.38%
Black or African American alone (NH)	20	3.04%
Native American or Alaska Native alone (NH)	8	1.22%
Asian alone (NH)	2	0.30%
Native Hawaiian or Pacific Islander alone (NH)	1	0.15%
Other race alone (NH)	2	0.30%
Mixed race or Multiracial (NH)	30	4.56%
Hispanic or Latino (any race)	224	34.04%
Total	658	100.00%
