= Jack Bush (American football) =

American football coach

Current position
- Title: Outside linebackers coach, special teams coordinator
- Team: Mississippi Valley State
- Conference: SWAC

Biographical details
- Education: Lincoln (MO) (1970)

Coaching career (HC unless noted)
- 1980: Kansas City East HS (MO)
- 1988: Johnson C. Smith (DC)
- 1989–1990: Central State (OH) (DL)
- 1991–1992: Bowling Green (RB/RC)
- 1993: New England Patriots (scout)
- 1994: Randallstown HS (MD)
- 1995: Central State (OH) (DC)
- 1996: Central State (OH)
- 1997–1998: Lincoln (MO) (assistant)
- 2000–2001: Lincoln (MO)
- 2003–2004: Alabama State (TE)
- 2005: Tuskegee (DL)
- 2006: Jackson State (DL/ST)
- 2007–2010: Jackson State (dir. of football oper.)
- 2011–2013: Avila DB)
- 2014: Mississippi Valley State (RB)
- 2015–present: Mississippi Valley State OLB/ST)

Head coaching record
- Overall: 7–19 (college)

Jack Bush is an American football coach. He currently serves as the outside linebackers coach and special teams coordinator at Mississippi Valley State University in Itta Bena, Mississippi. Bush served as the head football coach at Central State University in Wilberforce, Ohio in 1996 and Lincoln University in Jefferson City, Missouri from to 2000 to 2001.

== Head coaching record ==
=== College ===
Year	Team	Overall	Conference	Standing	Bowl/playoffs
Central State Marauders (NAIA Division I football independent) (1996)
1996	Central State	4–4			
Central State:		4–4			
Lincoln Blue Tigers (Central States Football League) (2000)
2000	Lincoln	3–6	2–3	4th	
Lincoln Blue Tigers (NCAA Division II independent) (2001)
2001	Lincoln	0–9			
Lincoln:		3–15	2–3		
Total:		7–19			
