= Northeast High School (Missouri) =

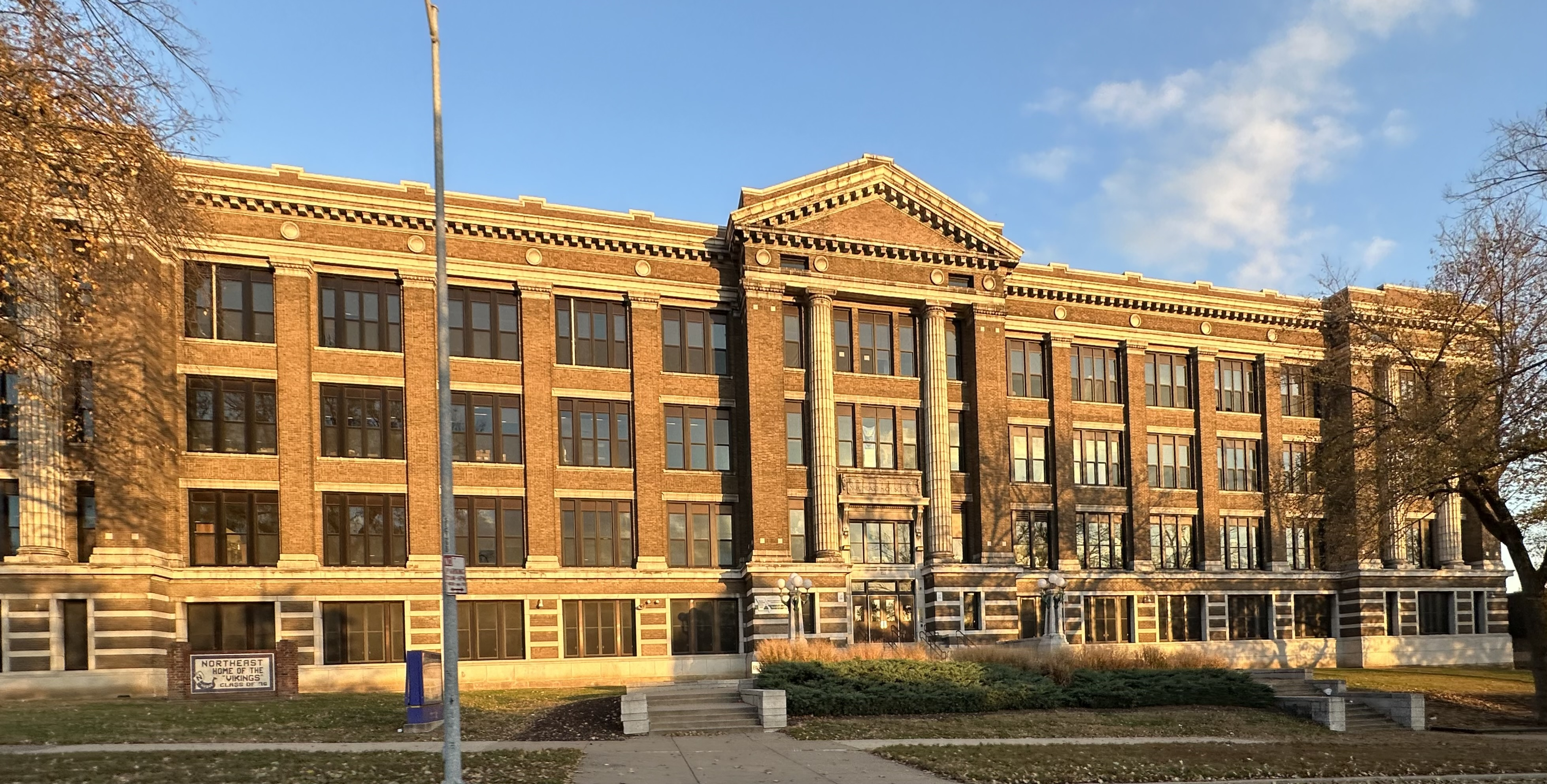

Location
- Kansas City, Missouri; United States; 39.10833°N 94.52523°W

Information
- Type: Public
- Motto: "The Best Getting Better"
- Established: 1914; 112 years ago
- School district: Kansas City Public Schools
- NCES School ID: 291640000860
- Principal: Douglas Bolden
- Teaching staff: 41.97 (FTE)
- Grades: 9–12
- Enrollment: 697 (2023–2024)
- Student to teacher ratio: 16.61
- Colors: Purple and White
- Athletics conference: Interscholastic League
- Mascot: Vikings
- Nickname: The Castle on the Hill
- Newspaper: The Nor'easter
- Yearbook: The Courier
- Website: Official website

Northeast High School is a public high school located at 415 Van Brunt Boulevard in the Historic Northeast area of Kansas City, Missouri. It is part of the Kansas City Public Schools and opened in 1914. Due to its prominent location and imposing architecture, the school is widely known by its nickname, "The Castle on the Hill".

The building was designed by architect Charles A. Smith in the Collegiate Gothic style. Upon its completion, it was one of the largest and most advanced schools in the state. During the city's lengthy desegregation case, Missouri v. Jenkins, Northeast was converted into a federally funded magnet school with a focus on law and public service, adding unique facilities such as a mock courtroom. In the 21st century, the school has become defined by its role as a hub for Kansas City's immigrant and refugee communities. It houses the school district's "New Americans" program and is noted for its exceptional cultural and linguistic diversity, with over 50 languages spoken by its students. The student body is composed overwhelmingly of economically disadvantaged backgrounds, with approximately 95% qualifying for free or reduced-price lunch. It has a large alumni association, which was founded in 1948 and is a key institution in the school's community. In 2022, the school faced a recommendation for closure from the school district, but was saved after significant mobilization from its alumni association.

== History ==
The establishment of a high school in the Northeast was first advocated by the local Northeast Improvement Association in May 1911. That November, the school district purchased a 6.5 acres (2.6 ha) plot for US$32,500 (equivalent to $1,100,000 in 2025). The building was designed by the district's in-house architect, Charles A. Smith, and constructed between 1912 and its opening in 1914 at a cost of approximately $500,000 (equivalent to $16,100,000 in 2025). Upon completion, it was one of the largest and most well-equipped schools in the state.

The student body chose purple and white as the school colors on October 28, 1913. The school newspaper, The Nor'easter, was founded one week later, followed by the school yearbook, The Courier.

As part of the remedy phase of the landmark federal desegregation case Missouri v. Jenkins, Northeast was converted into a magnet school with a focus on Law, Public Service, and Military Science. The court-ordered program aimed to reverse white flight by creating unique, high-quality curricula and facilities to achieve "desegregative attractiveness". This led to significant federal funding for capital improvements, including the construction of specialized facilities to support the magnet theme, including a mock trial courtroom.

In October 2022, as part of a long-term infrastructure plan named "Blueprint 2030", Kansas City Public Schools administration recommended closing ten schools to consolidate resources, including Northeast High School. The proposal cited the building's age and the high cost of needed renovations. The recommendation was met with significant opposition from the school's large and active alumni association, students, and community members. After several months of public feedback, the district reversed its position. In January 2023, the KCPS board voted on a revised plan that removed Northeast High School from the closure list, ensuring the school would remain open.

== Campus ==
The school occupies a full city block. The main building was designed by architect Charles A. Smith in the Collegiate Gothic style, intended to evoke the appearance of a European castle or university. Its defining features include a prominent central tower, castellated parapets, and decorative limestone and terra cotta ornamentation. The building's three-story, H-plan layout was a model for modern schools of its era, designed to maximize natural light and ventilation in classrooms. The construction utilized reinforced concrete, a relatively new technology for the time, making the building fireproof.

The campus includes outdoor athletic facilities located to the south, including a football field and track. A new gymnasium, weight room, and locker rooms were constructed on the south side of the building in 1988.

== Academics and demographics ==
For the 2023–2024 school year, Northeast had an enrollment of 697 students with the following demographic profile:

- Hispanic: 49.1%
- Black: 35.9%
- White: 8.2%
- Asian: 4.6%
- Two or more races: 2.2%
- Native American/Alaskan: 0.1%

Approximately 95% of students were designated as economically disadvantaged, qualifying for free or reduced-price lunch programs.

Reflecting its location as a hub for refugee and immigrant communities, the school has an exceptionally diverse student body. It houses the district's "New Americans" program for English Language Learners (ELL). The school reports that over 50 languages are spoken by its students.

Northeast follows the "College and Career Academies" model adopted by KCPS. Students can choose to enroll in specific pathways, including the Academy of Global & Diplomatic Studies and the Academy of Justice, Law, & Public Safety. The school also offers an Early College Academy in partnership with Metropolitan Community College, allowing students to earn an associate degree concurrently with their high school diploma.

== Alumni association ==
The Northeast High School Alumni Association was established in 1948. It is a registered 501(c)(3) organization that has been in continuous operation for over 75 years. The school's website states it has "one of the largest alumnae groups in the nation", and the association is the official custodian of the school's vast onsite historical archives.

== Athletics ==
The Northeast Vikings compete in the Interscholastic League. For much of its history, the school maintained a significant city rivalry with the now-closed Westport High School. The school has won three state championships in 1927, 1930, and 1935, according to the Missouri State High School Activities Association (MSHSAA).

== Notable alumni ==
- Bob Dernier (1975) – Major League Baseball outfielder; 1984 Gold Glove Award winner with the Chicago Cubs.
- Clarence M. Kelley (1930) – Chief of the Kansas City Police Department and second Director of the FBI.
- Dick Kenworthy (1959) – Major League Baseball infielder for the Chicago White Sox.
- William S. Sessions (1948) – Federal judge and fourth Director of the FBI.
- Maxwell D. Taylor (1917) – U.S. Army General; Commander of the 101st Airborne Division in World War II and Chairman of the Joint Chiefs of Staff.
- Harlene Wood (1931) – Actress and songwriter, co-wrote the international peace song "Let There Be Peace on Earth" under the name Jill Jackson-Miller.
