= William Chrisman High School =

Location
- 1223 North Noland Road; Independence, Missouri 64050-1947; United States; 39°6′12″N 94°24′42″W

Information
- Type: Public, grades 9–12
- Established: 1888
- School district: Independence School District
- Superintendent: Dale Herl
- Principal: Denise Textor
- Teaching staff: 83.63 (on an FTE basis)
- Enrollment: 1,441 (2023–2024)
- Student to teacher ratio: 17.23
- Colors: Navy and Vegas gold
- Nickname: Bears
- Website: chrisman.isdschools.org

William Chrisman High School is a high school located in Independence, Missouri, United States, as part of the Independence School District.

== History ==
The school was founded in 1888 and was known as Independence High School. The first building was located at the intersection of Pleasant and Truman Road, the current location of the Palmer/Central Office Building. It is from this location that President Harry S. Truman, First Lady Bess Truman, and Truman White House Press Secretary and Pulitzer Prize winner Charles Griffith Ross graduated in 1901.

In 1917 the Independence School District passed a levy and bond to build a new high school building. Margaret Chrisman Swope offered to sell the district land for the new school at the southeast corner of Union and Maple for $1 in exchange for naming the school after her father, William Chrisman. Chrisman had served as a member of the first school board in 1866 and was also a prominent lawyer and banker in the community. The new building opened in 1918 as William Chrisman High School. The high school moved to its current site in 1956, at the northeast corner of Noland Road and U.S. Route 24 (Independence Avenue), when a major addition was added to Ott Elementary School and the building was converted into the high school. Since that time the building has undergone numerous additions.

== Demographics ==
William Chrisman is home to 1,441 students from Independence, Missouri, and part of Sugar Creek, Missouri, (as of the 2025–2026 school year). The student population's racial breakdown is: 62.9% white, 17.8% Hispanic, 12.8% Black, 2.2% Asian and Pacific Islander, and 0.8% Native American, with 3.5% of students identifying as two or more races.

== Extracurricular ==
=== Sports and activities ===
William Chrisman is a member of the Greater Kansas City Suburban Conference: White Division. These divisions are realigned every two years. As of 2025, members of the White Division are as follows: Belton, Fort Osage, Grain Valley, Platte County, Raytown, Ruskin, Truman, and William Chrisman; Ruskin will depart this division in 2026.

William Chrisman also plays its local rivals, Truman, and Van Horn, which are also part of the Independence School District.

The William Chrisman Bears compete in the following sports:

- Fall
  - Boys: cross country, football, soccer, swimming
  - Girls: volleyball, cross country, golf, softball, tennis, dance, cheer
- Winter
  - Boys: basketball, wrestling
  - Girls: basketball, swimming, dance, cheer
- Spring
  - Boys: baseball, golf, tennis, track & field
  - Girls: soccer, track & field

== Robotics ==
The school district's FIRST Robotics Competition team, Team 1723 the FBI (First Bots of Independence), was founded in 2006. The student members from all three ISD high schools meet almost all year round at William Chrisman High school. The FBI is also active in the ISD community; many members from the team mentor ISD middle school and elementary school FIRST Lego League teams and host an annual FIRST Lego League tournament at George Caleb Bingham Middle School.

== Notable alumni ==
- Forrest "Phog" Allen, University of Kansas basketball coach
- Don Buschhorn, former MLB player (Kansas City Athletics)
- Mort Cooper, former MLB player (St. Louis Cardinals, Boston Braves, New York Giants, Chicago Cubs)
- Walker Cooper, former MLB player (St. Louis Cardinals, New York Giants, Boston Braves, Pittsburgh Pirates, Chicago Cubs)
- Don Ettinger, linebacker and guard (New York Giants of the National Football League (NFL) from 1948 season to 1950 season)
- Paul Henning, television producer (The Beverly Hillbillies, Petticoat Junction, Green Acres)
- Jared Huffman, U.S. Congressman for California's 2nd congressional district)
- Sharon Kinne, serial killer; one of the longest fugitives in American history
- Russ Morman, former MLB player (Florida Marlins, Chicago White Sox, Kansas City Royals); hitting coach (Fresno Grizzlies)
- Paul C. Nagel, historian; biographer
- Barbara J. Potts, first female mayor of Independence
- Charles Ross, White House Press Secretary (Harry S. Truman administration); Pulitzer Prize-winning journalist
- Ellis Short, billionaire investor
- Tava Smiley, television actress
- Orvar Swenson, pediatric surgeon
- Bess Wallace Truman, former first lady of the United States
- Harry S. Truman, 33rd president of the United States
- Madisen Ward, musician; member, folk duo Madisen Ward and The Mama Bear
