= Ida M. Bowman Becks =

American elocutionist, suffragist

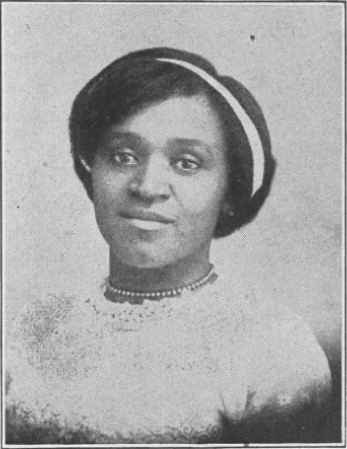
- Born: Ida M. Bowman; March 28, 1880; Armstrong, MO
- Died: ?
- Occupations: elocutionist, suffragist, community organizer
- Spouse: H. W. Becks

Ida M. Bowman Becks (March 28, 1880 – 1953), also known as Ida M. Becks, was an American elocutionist, suffragist, and African-American community organizer. She played prominent roles in establishing a number of community organizations, especially in Kansas City, Kansas, from the 1910s to the late 1940s.

== Life ==
Ida M. Bowman was born on March 28, 1880, in Armstrong, Missouri. She was the daughter of Milton Bowman.

Bowman finished grammar school in 1896, and then attended the Lincoln School in Carrollton, Missouri. She graduated in 1899 as class valedictorian. Bowman then did post-graduate studies in Wichita, Kansas.

She moved to Dayton, Ohio, and began working as the secretary of the Colored Women‘s League. While in Dayton, she met H. W. Becks. The two married in 1907. In 1908, the couple moved to Kansas City, Kansas.

Becks worked for two years as the field representative for the Florence Crittenton Home in Topeka, Kansas. She then became the field representative for the National Training School in Washington, D.C., under the auspices of the Women’s Auxiliary of the National Baptist Convention.

Becks was also a nationally-known elocutionist and an “ardent suffragist.” She trained at the Chicago School of Elocution and spoke publicly at Chautauqua schools and other public events. In 1919, she spoke at a memorial service for Theodore Roosevelt at Second Baptist Church in Kansas City (where Becks and her husband were members), discussing Roosevelt’s views on women's suffrage. In the same year, Becks led a debate about women’s suffrage at Ebenezer AME Church.^{: 144}

Becks continued her public health work as well. In 1919, she fundraised for the Red Cross, and led the drive to establish a chapter of the Urban League and a community center for African-American men. In the early 1920s she served on the board of directors of the Wheatley-Provident Hospital. She also helped establish a local chapter of the YWCA to serve the African-American community.^{: 145}

In 1921, Becks was one of five delegates to the NAACP convention in Detroit. That year, she also established a Kansas City chapter of the Negro Women’s National Republican League, of which she was elected chairman. Becks was also a delegate representing Kansas City at the 1925 National Negro Educational Congress. She and her fellow delegates “use[d] the congress as a forum for a critique of American society and of black responses within that society.”^{: 128,165}

By 1926, Becks was serving as the president of the City Federation of Colored Women's Clubs. That year, the Federation clashed with the local NAACP when the latter called for a boycott of a performance of The Miracle, due to the show's purportedly segregated seating. Becks and a friend eschewed the boycott; they purchased tickets and attended the show, in her words, "unmolested, in a section where very few colored people were seated."

Becks and her husband lived in Kansas City and remained active in the Baptist Church through the late 1940s.^{: 145}

== Selected works ==
Becks wrote a play entitled Up From Slavery: Evening's Entertainment in 8 Acts, which she copyrighted in 1916.
