= Barbara Potts =

American politician (born 1932)

Barbara J. Potts

46th Mayor of Independence, Missouri
- In office 1982–1990
- Preceded by: E.Lee Comer, Jr.
- Succeeded by: William Carpenter

Personal details
- Born: February 18, 1932 (age 94) Los Angeles, California, U.S.
- Spouse: Dr. Donald A. Potts
- Education: Graceland University
- Occupation: Former Executive Director, Jackson County Historical Society

Barbara J. Potts (born February 18, 1932) is an American politician and the first woman elected Mayor of Independence, Missouri (1990 population 112,304). Potts served in office at a time when fewer than 10% of US cities had women mayors. She also served on the Independence City Council. Potts graduated from William Chrisman High School in 1949 and Graceland University in 1951.

== Biography ==
Barbara Potts was the first woman mayor of Independence, Missouri, birthplace of Harry S. Truman, the 33rd president of the United States. She served two consecutive four-year terms as mayor after completing a four-year term on the city council. She initiated and oversaw a number of projects to address social concerns and historical preservation including the 1983 opening of Hope House, an emergency shelter for domestic-violence victims, and the Crossroads Homeless Center. Other achievements included the acceptance of the Truman Home by the National Park Service, the opening of National Frontier Trails Museum, and the establishment of the Truman Heartland Community Foundation

As mayor, Potts chaired the city's Harry S. Truman Public Service Award commission, a program of national scope. She served on the board for the Truman Library Institute after leaving political office in 1990 and remains an honorary trustee of the organization.

Potts also served on both the national and local committees for the 1984 Harry S. Truman Centennial, a series of events commemorating the 100th anniversary of the former president's birthday. In May 1988, Potts coordinated with United States Representative Alan Wheat to expand the Harry S. Truman National Historic Site.

In 1985, Potts published "Independence", a book highlighting the historic Missouri community.

In 1987, the FBI led an investigation in Independence looking into potential corruption involving local government and business leaders. In 1988, Potts revealed she had triggered the investigation by raising concerns with authorities, and also cooperated with them in an undercover role. A former city council member, John Carnes, eventually pled guilty to bribery and extortion.

In 1991, Potts was named executive director for the Jackson County Historical Society.

== Acknowledgements & Awards ==
In 1998, U.S. Rep. Karen McCarthy of Missouri recognized Barbara Potts in the US House of Representatives for establishing the Women's History Collection at the Jackson County Historical Society & Library.

In 2010, Potts received a Truman Award for Special Recognition from the Truman Library Institute, acknowledging her years of service to the organization.

In 2014, the city honored Potts by renaming the Independence Public Health Department building the Barbara J. Potts Public Health Center.

In 2017, Potts earned a Lifetime Achievement award from The Examiner's "Women of Distinction" program.

In 2018, Potts earned a Lifetime Achievement award from Hope House.
