= Southwest High School (Kansas City, Missouri) =

Southwest Early College Campus
- Southwest High School

Location
- 6512 Wornall Road; Kansas City, Missouri

Information
- Type: Public
- Established: 1925
- Status: Closed
- Closed: 2016
- School district: KCMOSD
- Grades: 10-12
- Campus: Urban
- Colors: Black and Orange
- Mascot: Indians
- Yearbook: Sachem

Southwest High School was a comprehensive high school located at 6512 Wornall Road in Kansas City, Missouri. It was part of the Kansas City, Missouri School District. The school is in the Brookside neighborhood, two blocks south of Border Star Montessori. It was the only school in the Kansas City, Missouri School District that had on-site planetarium and science laboratories.

The school was founded in 1925 and grew throughout the years. During the 1970s, the school experienced significant desegregation and civil unrest. The school slowly began to struggle, both financially and academically and closed in 1998. The school reopened the following year as Southwest Charter School, but closed again in 2005. The school reopened yet again in 2008 as Southwest Early College Campus, but closed at the end of the school year in 2016.

The school offered many academic and extracurricular activities and programs and competed as the "Indians." The school colors were black and orange and the school yearbook was known as "The Sachem," a reference to the school mascot. Throughout its history, the school produced many notable alumni including the filmmaker Robert Altman, writer Calvin Trillin, the founders of H&R Block, actor Chris Cooper and rapper Tech N9ne, among others.

== History ==
Southwest High School was established in 1927. From the 1930s through the 1960s, the school was recognized as one of the top schools in the area. For five decades, Southwest High School had a predominantly white student body. In the late 1960s, a few black students began attending. During the 1970s the black student population increased significantly at Southwest High. In 1973, Southwest had a black student population of 2%. In 1974 there was a six-week teacher's strike which led several students to transfer to other schools. By the late 1970s, the black student population was approximately 60% due to busing and attendance boundary changes that began during the 1975-1976 school year.

The school reorganized into a charter school in 1998, but failed and ended up closing. The building opened again in 1999 as Southwest Charter School. This lasted until 2005, when the school closed for a second time. Southwest became part of the school district again in August 2008, opening as Southwest Early College Campus. The new school was based on math and science, and allowed students to earn 20 to 60 hours of college credit from the University of Missouri-Kansas City before graduating.

Academie Lafayette, a French-immersion charter school, was scheduled to have high school classes in the Southwest building starting with the 2015-2016 school year. The Kansas City School District made the announcement June 9, 2014. After a group of ministers and public school advocates criticized the plan in March 2015, the Academie stepped back from the plan.

The school closed again after the last day of classes in 2016, with a graduating class of 70 students. The total student body at the time of the 2016 closing was 94% minority and 98% economically disadvantaged.

In the 2017-2018 school year, St. Peter's, a local Catholic school moved into Southwest for a semester while the school was undergoing construction. The school remains closed as of October 2018.

== Future ==
As of 2018, community groups and the Kansas City School District are considering uses for the building. One option that has been proposed is a hybrid that will serve as a traditional neighborhood school but will have more control over the curriculum than a district school. The proposed curriculum would employ “project-based learning” — an interactive, STEM-focused concept. There would be four primary points of emphasis: diversity by design, student-centered and project-based learning, autonomy with accountability and interaction with the surrounding community.

== Athletics ==
The athletic teams were known as the Indians and competed in several sports.

=== State championships ===
State Championships
Season	Sport	Number of Championships	Year
Spring	Golf, Boys	1	1965
Spring	Track and Field, Boys	4	1953, 1955, 1957, 1958
Total		5	

== Alumni ==
- Robert Altman – film director
- Henry Bloch – co-founder of H&R Block
- Richard Bloch – co-founder of H&R Block
- Evan S. Connell – novelist, poet, and short story writer
- Chris Cooper – actor
- Michael Harden – professional football player
- Michael Jones – professional football player
- Terry O'Sullivan - actor
- David Parsons – choreographer
- Berton Roueché – medical writer who wrote for The New Yorker magazine for almost fifty years
- Screamin' Scott Simon – member of rock and roll group Sha Na Na
- Richard Smalley – 1961 Nobel Prize winner
- Joseph Edward Stevens Jr. – U.S. District Judge
- Big Scoob - Rapper
- Tech N9ne – birth name Aaron Yates, rapper
- Calvin Trillin – journalist, humorist, and novelist
- Ruth Warrick – actor; original All My Children cast member
- Halbert White – econometrician, Class of 1968 salutatorian
- Chuck Wild – composer, producer, Emmy-nominated songwriter
- Larry Winn – businessman; U.S. Representative from Kansas 1967 to 1985
- Robert Worcester – British political commentator and market research pioneer
