= Gery Palmer =

American football player (1952-2014)

- Palmer in 1975

No. 71, 73
- Positions: Tackle, Guard, Defensive tackle

Personal information
- Born: December 25, 1950; Weimar, Texas, U.S.
- Listed height: 6 ft 4 in (1.93 m)
- Listed weight: 260 lb (118 kg)

Career information
- High school: Center (Kansas City, Missouri)
- College: Kansas
- NFL draft: 1973: 4th round, 83rd overall pick

Career history
- Baltimore Colts (1973-1974)*; Kansas City Chiefs (1975)
- * Offseason or practice squad member only

Career NFL statistics
- Games played: 2
- Starts: 2
- Stats at Pro Football Reference

Gery Dean Palmer (born December 25, 1952) is an American former professional football player who was an offensive lineman for the Baltimore Colts and Kansas City Chiefs of the National Football League (NFL). He played college football for the Kansas Jayhawks.

== Biography ==
=== Early life ===
Gery Palmer was born on Christmas Day, December 25, 1950, in Weimar, Texas. He attended Center High School in Kansas City, Missouri.

=== Football career ===
Palmer was a starting defensive tackle during his collegiate days but was moved to the offensive side of the ball by the Colts after they drafted him 83rd overall in the fourth round of the 1973 NFL draft. Although judged by the club as showing "excellent promise" at the position due to his size and quickness, he was deemed not yet ready for the NFL and was relegated to the Colts' "taxi squad" for the duration of the 1973 season.

Returning to the Colts for 1974 season with hopes of making the final roster, Palmer suffered a season-ending knee injury in a preseason game against the Cleveland Browns held in Tampa, Florida.

Palmer was back in Colts' camp ahead of the 1975 season but was cut from the team ahead of the season. He returned home to Lawrence, Kansas, and took a job selling used cars. It was there that the Kansas City Chiefs found him, signed him to a free agent contract and took a brief look at him before releasing him from the team.

Chief right guard Tom Condon went down due to injury, however, and the Chiefs scrambled to re-sign Palmer to fill the hole in the roster. Palmer got his first NFL start on November 23, 1975, against the Detroit Lions, even going in for two plays for his new club at defensive tackle during the game's overtime period after three Chiefs defensive linemen had come out of the game due to injuries. The Lions ran directly at the newcomer Palmer twice, on third and fourth down, but Palmer stood his ground and made both tackles, acquitting himself well in what would be his team's 24–21 loss.

His first NFL appearance would prove costly to Palmer, however, as he suffered a debilitating back injury in the game. Palmer would start only one more game for the Chiefs during the 1975 season.

Palmer tried to latch on with the New Orleans Saints for the 1976 season but early in July he failed the team physical, effectively ending his NFL career.

=== Worker's compensation lawsuit ===
In 1981, Palmer attempted a novel and groundbreaking administrative filing, arguing that his career-ending injury suffered on the field with the Chiefs should be covered under worker's compensation law as a job-related occupational injury. The Missouri Labor and Industrial Relations Commission initially awarded Palmer $4,800 in worker's compensation benefits, with the Chiefs suing to overturn the ruling.

A Jackson County Circuit Court initially found in Palmer's favor, but this decision was subsequently reversed on appeal, with the Missouri Court of Appeals issuing its ruling in August, and the Missouri Supreme Court silently letting this decision stand on October 13, 1981.

Attorney Margaret Lineberry for the victorious Chiefs characterized the court's ruling as clear under Missouri's worker's compensation law, stating: "To be eligible, you have to not only prove you were injured on the job, but that it also was an accident. His injury was not the result of an accident."
