= Reaner Shannon =

American academic (1936–2022)

- Reaner Gunnels (later Shannon), from the 1955 yearbook of Lincoln High School in Kansas City, MO.
- Born: Reaner Gunnels; October 6, 1936; Solgohachia, Arkansas
- Died: July 13, 2022 (aged 85); Kansas City, Missouri
- Occupations: Medical technologist, medical school dean

Reaner Gunnels Shannon (October 6, 1936 – July 13, 2022) was an American medical technologist, educator, and philanthropist. From 1998 to 2008, she was associate dean for minority affairs at the University of Missouri–Kansas City School of Medicine (UMKC).

== Early life and education ==
Reaner Gunnels was born in Solgohachia, Arkansas, and raised in Kansas City, Missouri, the daughter of Hosea D. Gunnels and Blanchia Hardy Gunnels. Her father was a maintenance worker at the Lake City Army Ammunition Plant. She graduated from Lincoln High School in 1955. She completed her doctoral studies in curriculum and instruction and healthcare administration at UMKC in 1983. Her dissertation was titled "A comparison of attitudes of medical students at different levels of medical education." She was a member of the Alpha Kappa Alpha sorority.

== Career ==
Shannon was chief lab technologist at the UMKC's Truman Medical Center, Department of Hematology. In 1990 she became the school's director of minority affairs, and in 1998 she was promoted to associate dean for minority affairs. She began the UMKC School of Medicine Diversity, Equity, and Inclusion Council in 2001. She launched Saturday Academy, a free weekend STEM program for teens, and Summer Scholars, a two-week summer program. She and her husband created the Dr. Reaner and Mr. Henry Shannon Lectureship in Minority Health in 2006. She retired from UMKC in 2008; she received the Bill French Alumni Service Award from UMKC in 2008.

Shannon was a member of the boards of directors of the Black Health Care Coalition and the Edgar Snow Foundation. She was appointed to the advisory commission of Missouri's Minority and Underrepresented Environmental Literacy Program.

== Publications ==
Reaner collaborated with physicians, nurses, and other medical researchers on publications that appeared in American Journal of Obstetrics and Gynecology, Clinical Pediatrics, and Annals of the New York Academy of Sciences. She also co-wrote a laboratory manual, Laboratory Evaluation of Hemostasis and Thrombosis (1983), with Marjorie S. Sirridge.

- "A study of blood coagulation parameters" (1976, with Robert L. Newman, Marjorie Sirridge, and Margaret Brinkman)
- Laboratory Evaluation of Hemostasis and Thrombosis (1983, with Marjorie S. Sirridge)
- "Heparin Lock Intravenous Line: Use in Newborns: A Clinical Trial" (1989, with John Taylor and Howard W. Kilbride)
- "Protein C Levels in Sickle Cell Diseases" (1989, with Raj Terkonda, Scot Ebbinghaus, T. Lee Willoughby, Marjorie Sirridge, and Alan Lichtin)

== Personal life ==
Gunnels married fellow medical technologist Henry Shannon in 1960. They had a daughter, Pamela. Both Shannons died in 2022; Reaner Shannon died in July 2022 at the age of 85, and her widower died in December 2022, at the age of 89.
