= Missouri Route 12 =

State highway in Missouri, U.S.

Route 12
- Truman Road

Route information
- Maintained by MoDOT
- Length: 3.787 mi (6.095 km)

Major junctions
- West end: I-435 in Kansas City
- East end: Spring Street / White Oak Street / Truman Road in Independence

Location
- Country: United States
- State: Missouri

Highway system
- Missouri State Highway System; Interstate; US; State; Supplemental
← Route 11	→ Route 13

Route 12 is a short highway in the Kansas City metropolitan area. Its eastern terminus is at Spring Street in Independence. Its western terminus is at Interstate 435 at the eastern edge of Kansas City. The highway is known as Truman Road in Independence, Missouri and passes by the home of Harry S. Truman. US 24 travels east-west about a half-mile north of Route 12 and Route 78 travels parallel about one mile south. Its busiest portion has a moderate traffic volume of roughly 13,000 vehicles per day in both direction Route 12 is a short but significant highway within the Kansas City metropolitan area, providing access to key historical landmarks and serving as an important local thoroughfare.

== Route description ==
Beginning at I-435 at the eastern edge of Kansas City, Route 12 travels eastward through Jackson County locally known as Truman Road. Shortly after its starting point, Route 12 passes through Blue Summit, a small community within the Kansas City metropolitan area.

Continuing eastward, Route 12 enters Independence, where it serves as a major arterial road. The highway passes near the Harry S. Truman National Historic Site, which includes the former home of Harry S. Truman. Route 12 continues through Independence, intersecting several local streets before reaching its eastern terminus at Spring Street, near the intersection with White Oak Street.

== History ==
Several other highways were known as Route 12 from the introduction of the Missouri state highway system in 1922, but Route 12 in Jackson County was designated in 1950.

== Major intersections ==
The entire route is in Jackson County.

Location	mi	km	Destinations	Notes
Blue Summit	0.000– 0.075	0.000– 0.121	I-435 / US 24 – Grandview, Claycomo	Diamond interchange; exit 60 on I-435
Independence	3.787	6.095	Spring Street / White Oak Street / Truman Road	Eastern terminus
1.000 mi = 1.609 km; 1.000 km = 0.621 mi
