= West High School (Kansas City, Missouri) =

High school in Kansas City, Missouri, USA

Coordinates: 39.089981°N 94.594247°W

- Kansas City, Missouri; United States

Information
- Closed: 1981
- School district: Kansas City Public Schools

West High School was a high school in Kansas City, Missouri, United States. It was a part of the Kansas City, Missouri School District.

West High School had the highest Latino population of any high school in the district. In 1978, Don Pecina led a group of parents who examined West High School; they wished to improve the education since many residents of western Kansas City committed crimes and died in violent manners. The group formed the Coalition to Preserve Education on the Westside. On August 7, 1980, the group hijacked the school. After three days of negotiations between the district and the coalition, the district agreed to open a new program at West High School in 1981. Instead, the school was closed that year. The high school building has since been converted into apartments.
