= Center High School (Missouri) =

Location
- 8715 Holmes Road, Kansas City, MO 64131; United States; 38.9683°N 94.5798°W

Information
- School district: Center School District #58
- Principal: Mark Wiegers
- Grades: 9–12
- Gender: Co-Ed
- Age range: 14–19
- Enrollment: 679 (2024–2025)
- Colors: Blue and gold
- Teams: Yellowjackets
- Yearbook: The Yellowjacket
- Website: www.center.k12.mo.us/o/chs

Center High School is a public high school in Kansas City, Missouri. It is the only high school within the Center School District.

== Sports teams ==
=== Conference ===
Missouri River Valley Conference (MRVC) West

=== Boys ===
- Baseball (spring season)
- Basketball
- Cross country
- Football
- Golf
- Soccer
- Track and field
- Wrestling

=== Girls ===
- Basketball
- Cross country
- Soccer
- Swimming and diving
- Tennis
- Track and field
- Volleyball
- Wrestling

== Alumni ==
- Jasmine Becket-Griffith (b. 1979), acrylic painter and fantasy artist known for her work with The Walt Disney Company
- Jon Koncak (b. 1963), professional basketball center with the Atlanta Hawks and Orlando Magic
- Gery Palmer (b. 1952), professional football lineman with the Baltimore Colts and Kansas City Chiefs
- Rachaad White (b. 1999), professional football running back with the Washington Commanders

== See also ==
- List of schools in the Kansas City metropolitan area
