= Center School District =

School district in Missouri, U.S.

Address
- 8701 Holmes Road Kansas City, Missouri, 64131; United States

District information
- Type: Public
- Grades: PreK–12
- NCES District ID: 2908250

Students and staff
- Students: 2,507
- Teachers: 221.87
- Staff: 227.42
- Student–teacher ratio: 11.3

Other information
- Website: www.center.k12.mo.us

Center School District 58 is a school district headquartered in Kansas City, Missouri.

== Schools ==
Secondary:

- Center High School
- Center Middle School

Elementary:

- Boone Elementary
- Center Elementary
- Indian Creek Elementary
- Red Bridge Elementary
- South City View Elementary School (permanently closed)
- Center Annex Elementary School (permanently closed)

Preschool:

- Early Childhood Center

Alternative:

- Center Academy for Success
