= William Chrisman =

American politician

Chrisman c. 1892

William Chrisman (November 23, 1822, near Lexington, Kentucky – January 27, 1897 in Independence, Missouri) was born to Joseph and Eleanor Chrisman. He attended Georgetown College and Center College in Kentucky where he received his degree in Law. In 1847 he was admitted to the bar and began practicing law in Danville, Kentucky.

== Career ==
On May 8 or May 10 1848, William Chrisman married Lucie A. Lee, a member of the distinguished Lee family of Virginia. That day, Mr. Chrisman and his bride set out for Independence, Missouri. Upon arrival, Chrisman was admitted to the bar in Missouri and began his law practice on the Independence Square.

Immediately an entrepreneur and community activist in addition to being a lawyer and banker, Mr. Chrisman soon managed "...the second largest tobacco plantation west of the Mississippi, and is the namesake of William Chrisman High School in Independence, Missouri...", A section of the 1877 book The Commonwealth of Missouri: A Centennial Record provides considerable information about William Chrisman. However, archaic syntax in the section initially gives a puzzling impression that William Chrisman (instead of his father, Joseph Chrisman) "...died in Clay County, Missouri in 1875".

In 1857, William Chrisman helped found the Chrisman-Sawyer Banking Company, which evolved directly from the already-established "Independence Savings Institution/Independence Savings Association". Over the years, with several changes in partners, the bank became Chrisman-Sawyer Banking Company. In 1995, the bank became known as Hillcrest Bank when Chrisman-Sawyer Bank merged with Hillcrest Bancshares company.

Hillcrest Bank headquarters remained in the same location as the original Chrisman-Sawyer Bank headquarters until offices were transferred to an Overland Park, Kansas location in 2007. An apparent casualty of the 2007-2010 U.S. Financial Crisis, the bank "failed" on Friday, October 22, 2010 and ownership was transferred for the time being to NBH Holdings Corporation of Boston, Massachusetts. Named one of the top "Most Efficient Bank Holding Companies" in the United States by American Banker Magazine in May 2008, Hillcrest Bank's condition nevertheless had come under scrutiny by banking regulators since October 2009. Hillcrest bank's failure was the largest in the Kansas City Metropolitan Area since 1991, and historically significant due to Chrisman-Sawyer Bank's legendary "survival" of the Panic of 1873.

In 1867 Chrisman was elected to the first Board of Education of the Independence School District. In that capacity he served as Secretary of the Board. He also helped found the Kansas City Ladies' College in Independence and paid for the financing of the college's principal buildings.

As a delegate to Missouri's 1875 Constitutional Convention, Chrisman helped craft the constitution of Missouri. The 1945 Constitution now used in Missouri is largely based on this document. Though relatively removed from politics, William Chrisman spent most of his life a member of the Whig Party and in later years switched to the Democratic Party.

William Chrisman suffered a stroke in 1888 and was forced to give up most of his law and financial business dealings.

== Death/Children ==
In February 1889, his wife Lucie died. William Chrisman died in 1897 and was buried in Mount Washington Cemetery in Independence, Missouri.

He was survived by his three children:

- George Chrisman – of Independence
- James Chrisman – who died at Fulton College
- Maggie Chrisman Swope. She married Logan Swope, the brother of Col. Thomas H. Swope, who was renowned in the area for his gift of Swope Park to Kansas City and his infamous murder.

== Posthumously ==
In 1917, the Independence School District pursued a campaign to build a new high school. The tax issue passed and a site was sought for the new home of Independence High School. Maggie Chrisman Swope offered the sale of a plot of land at Maple and Union for $1.00 in exchange for the high school being renamed after her father. Since the doors to the Maple Avenue building opened the school has been known as William Chrisman High School.

== Sources ==
- A Memorial Record of Kansas City and Jackson County, Missouri (1892)
