= Kansas City Public Schools =

School district in Missouri, U.S.

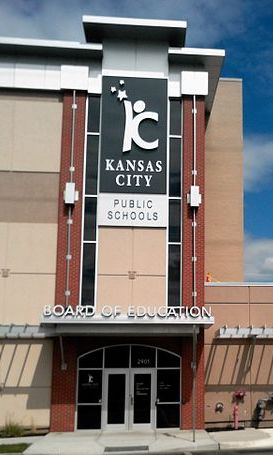

Location
- 2901 Troost Avenue; Kansas City, Missouri 64109 United States
- Coordinates: 39°05′58″N 94°34′45″W

District information
- Type: Public school district
- Motto: Destination: Excellence
- Grades: PreK - 12
- Established: 1867
- Superintendent: Dr. Jennifer Collier
- Accreditation: Fully Accredited
- Schools: 36
- Budget: $328 million
- NCES District ID: 2916400

Students and staff
- Students: 15,069, as of 2025-26
- Teachers: 1,175.89 (FTE) (2023–24)
- Staff: 1,464
- Student–teacher ratio: 12.50 (2023–24)

Other information
- Website: www.kcpublicschools.org

Kansas City 33 School District, operating as Kansas City Public Schools or KCPS (formerly Kansas City, Missouri School District, or KCMSD), is a school district headquartered at 2901 Troost Avenue in Kansas City, Missouri, United States.

The district regained full accreditation from the State Department of Education in 2022, beginning a time of upward trajectory for KCPS. Going into the 2026-27 school year, the district has had four consecutive years of enrollment growth, graduation rates, and state APR test improvements.

In April 2025, Kansas City voters approved the district's first public general obligation bond since 1967. The $474 million Bond effort was the largest bond outreach in the history of Missouri.

Since passing the Bond, the district has begun renovating each of its 36 school buildings, including major renovations to many schools and two new Family Empowerment Centers, which will each include an early childhood center, a family resource center, and an elementary school.

== Boundaries ==
The school district serves most of the residents of Kansas City, Missouri. The school district's borders are not contiguous with the boundaries of Kansas City; notably, it does not serve any of the city north of the Missouri River. Many areas that have been annexed by Kansas City over the years are served by 11 districts based in the suburbs.

It is bordered on the west by the Kansas/Missouri border line and on the east by the Independence and Raytown school districts. It is bordered on the north by the Missouri River. It is bordered on the south by the Hickman Mills school district and, at approximately 85th Street, by the Center school district.

== History ==
=== 1800s ===
At the end of the Civil War, there were no public schools in the entire state of Missouri. Aside from a limited number of private schools and colleges, there were few educational opportunities. During reconstruction, Radical Republicans advocated for strong statewide public education through several laws and the 1865 Constitution. As a response, the Kansas City Public School district was organized, with the first school board meeting taking place on 1 March 1867. At the time there was 2,150 school age children in the district. Funds were able to be scraped together for the formal start of the school year in October 1867. Eight rooms across the city, from church basements to abandoned dwellings, were secured. Ten teachers started the school year, which increased to 21 by the end of the first year. Bonds were issued for the first public school building, The Washington School, located on the corner of Independence Avenue and Cherry Street. By 1869, it had been enlarged to eight rooms and held seating for 500 pupils. A two room brick building named The Lincoln School, was built in 1869 on the corner of Ninth and Charlotte streets and was the first public segregated school for African American students in Kansas City.

During the Panic of 1873, school funding was stretched as teachers took 10% pay cuts. There was sharp opposition to public education particularly of high school, which was seen as "squandering the people's money." When the school board attempted to construct a high school on 9th Street between Cherry and Holmes, it was criticized for its "extravagance." Instead, it opened what was to become Central High School in a four room building on Eleventh and Locust streets. Originally named Kansas City High School, the school board changed the name to Central School in an effort to outwit the opposition.

By 1897, the district employed almost 500 teachers.

=== Annexations ===
Prior to 1957, areas annexed by the City of Kansas City were obligated to join the KCMO school district. Briana O'Higgins of KCUR wrote that prior to Brown v. Board of Education community members of smaller school districts "were happy to join KCMSD", which at the time was racially segregated.

==== Before 1900 ====
- April 1885: Portions of District #1 and the Oakley District.
- April 1886: Portions of the Ashland and Westport Districts.
- April 1887: Another portion of the Oakley District.
- February 16, 1899: Entire Westport District.

==== 1900 to 1950 ====
- April 16, 1903: Ivanhoe District.
- September 6, 1906: A portion of the Swope District.
- October 18, 1906; September 3, 1908; February 4, 1909; September 16, 1910: Four separate portions of the Seven Oaks District. Seven Oaks continued to exist.
- April 4, 1910: A portion of the Mount Washington District.
- May 18, 1910: Remaining portion of the Swope District.
- August 28, 1911: Entire District No. 101.
- September 7, 1911: Entire Border Star District.
- September 21, 1911: Another portion of the Seven Oaks District.
- November 2, 1911: Entire Briston District.
- November 16, 1911: Entire Mount Washington District.
- March 21, 1912: Part of the Boone District.
- August 27, 1912: Shiloh district.
- February 13, 1913: Remaining portion of the Seven Oaks District.
- September 2, 1913: A portion of the Center District.
- December 11, 1916: All of the Leeds District.
- August 7, 1947: The Ruhl–Hartman District.

==== 1950 to 2000 ====
- January 17, 1952: A portion of the Center District.
- May 11, 1955: Sugar Creek District.
- February 7, 1957: Rock Creek District.
- March 27, 1958: Pitcher–Fairview District.
- January 1, 1973: Pleasant Valley District.

According to O'Higgins, after Brown v. Board of Education, the KCMO district "started to quickly declined [sic]".

In 1957, legislation adopted by the Missouri government meant that areas annexed by the Kansas City municipal government no longer were required to join the KCMO school district. People moved to suburban areas away from the KCMO district, and O'Higgins stated that circa the 1970s "Facilities began to deteriorate and test scores fell."

=== State accreditation ===
From 1985 to 1999, a United States district court judge required the state of Missouri to fund the creation of magnet schools in the KCPS in order to reverse the white flight that had afflicted the school district since the 1960s. The district's annual budget more than tripled in the process. The expenditure per pupil and the student-teacher ratio were the best of any major school district in the nation. Many high schools were given college-level facilities. Despite all the largesse, test scores in the magnet schools did not rise; the black-white gap did not diminish; and there was less, not more, integration. On May 1, 2000, Kansas City Public Schools became the first district in the nation to lose accreditation. Finally, on September 20, 2011, the Missouri Board of Education voted unanimously to withdraw the district's accreditation status, effective January 1, 2012. In August 2014, the Board of Education granted provisional accreditation status to KCPS in recognition of the academic gains made by KCPS students. In 2022, the state restored full accreditation to KCPS.

=== Missouri v. Jenkins ===
Missouri v. Jenkins is a case decided by the U.S. Supreme Court. On June 12, 1995, the court, in a 5–4 decision, overturned a district court ruling that required the state of Missouri to correct de facto racial inequality in schools by funding salary increases and remedial education programs.

=== School closings since the 1980s ===
In the 1980s, 1990s, and 2000s, KCMSD closed at least 30 buildings. Some buildings were sold, some demolished, and some abandoned. In 2010, district superintendent John Covington submitted a plan calling for the closure of 29 of the district's remaining 61 schools. During that year, almost half of the KCMO schools closed. By that year, many students, instead of attending district schools, attended charter schools, private schools, parochial schools, and schools in suburban school districts. As of 2010, the school district had less than 18,000 students, half of its enrollment in 2000 and 25% of its peak population in the 1960s.

=== Transfer of schools to Independence in 2007-2008 ===
In November 2007, the voters of the Independence Public School District and the Kansas City, Missouri School District voted for seven schools (one high school, one middle school, and five elementary schools) to be taken over by the Independence School District. Victor Callahan, a state senator, supported the annexation and said that he hoped that KCMSD would disappear via annexations within a 10-year span. The teachers' union of Kansas City opposed the move. Gwendolyn Grant, the head of the Urban League of Greater Kansas City, supported the move; she said it would make the KCMSD school board more racially homogeneous and therefore reduce tensions within the school board. In November 2007 84% of voting residents within Independence and 66% of voting residents within Kansas City approved the transfer. Jim Hinson, the superintendent of the Independence district, believed that the KCMO district fought the annexation because it was a "pride issue" and because the KCMO district feared that other parts of the district could secede.

In April 2008, the Kansas City Missouri School District Buildings Corp. sued to receive a declaratory judgment on the value of the Independence buildings. In July 2008, Missouri Commissioner of Education D. Kent King asked for KCMSD to give up the schools. During that month, a judge ruled that Independence had a right to control the seven transferred schools and the closed Anderson Campus. In August 2008, the Independence School District wired more than $12.8 million dollars to the Kansas City, Missouri district. The building transfer was completed.

=== School openings in 2014 ===
In 2014, KCPS re-opened Hale Cook Elementary School at 7302 Pennsylvania Ave. in the Brookside neighborhood of Kansas City. This was in large part due to the grassroots effort by the Friends of Hale Cook community organization. The school had been mothballed since 2009. Hale Cook launched the school year with 108 students in pre-K through 2nd grade and will expand one grade every year until 6th grade.

The same summer, KCPS also re-opened Central Middle School at 3611 E. Linwood Boulevard and Northeast Middle School at 4904 Independence Avenue as neighborhood schools serving 7th graders. The schools will expand to include 8th graders in 2015.

In addition, KCPS expanded its pre-K program by opening a second Early Learning Center, Richardson, at 3515 Park Ave.

=== Broadcast station owner ===
Kansas City Public Television (KCPT) was signed on for the first time as Kansas City School District (KCSD), which owned the station until 1971. The school district put the license on the market in 1971. A group of civic leaders formed Public Television 19 and bought the license. The station relaunched in January 1972 as KCPT. That fall, it began broadcasting PBS shows in color for the first time.

== Superintendent ==
Dr. Jennifer Collier, a longtime teacher and administrator at Kansas City Public Schools, was named Interim Superintendent in 2022, taking over for Dr. Mark T. Bedell. Collier was hired as the district's full-time permanent Superintendent in February 2023.

Dr. Mark T. Bedell joined Kansas City Public Schools as Superintendent on July 1, 2016, serving through 2022, leaving to join the Anne Arundel County Public Schools, Maryland's fourth-largest school district.

Interim Superintendent Allan Tunis was named to the position on June 11, 2015. He was chosen by the Board of KCPS to maintain a focus on increasing individual student achievement in every KCPS school through academic best practices, top-flight employees, sound management, effective partnerships and public engagement.

Dr. R. Stephen Green was superintendent until June 2015. He was officially named to the position on April 2, 2012, after being interim superintendent since August 2011. On Wednesday, May 13, 2015, Dr. Green was announced as the sole finalist for superintendent of Dekalb County School District in Atlanta, Georgia. He will stay at the helm of the Kansas City Public Schools until 30 June 2015.

Dr. John Covington was superintendent from 2009 until his resignation in August 2011.

Anthony Amato was superintendent from July 2006 to January 2008.

Bernard Taylor was superintendent from at least May 2003 until 2005, when the school board declined to renew his contract.

Benjamin E. Demps Jr. was superintendent from August 2, 1999, until sometime before June 2003.

J. B. Bradley was elected the first as first superintendent in 1867 and also acted as a teacher for upper level students.

== Schools ==
All schools are in the City of Kansas City, Missouri.

=== High schools ===
Neighborhood

- Central High School - 3221 Indiana Avenue
- East High School - 1924 Van Brunt Boulevard
- Northeast High School - 415 Van Brunt Boulevard
- Southeast High School - 3500 East Meyer Boulevard

Special Options School

- Success Academy at Anderson -1601 Forest Ave.

Signature

- Lincoln College Preparatory Academy - 2111 Woodland Avenue
- Paseo Academy - 4747 Flora Avenue
- African-Centered College Preparatory Academy - 3500 East Meyer Boulevard
- Border Star Montessori - 6321 Wornall Road
- George Washington Carver Dual Language School - 4600 Elmwood Avenue
- Foreign Language Academy - 3450 Warwick Boulevard
- Harold Holliday, Sr. Montessori - 7227 Jackson Avenue

=== Career and technical centers ===
- Manual Career Tech - 1215 East Truman Road

=== Middle schools ===
- Central Middle School - 3611 E. Linwood Boulevard
- Northeast Middle School - 4904 Independence Avenue

=== Elementary schools ===
==== Neighborhood ====
- Banneker - 7050 Askew Avenue
- Faxon - 1320 E 32 Terrace
- Garcia - 1000 West 17th Street
- Garfield - 436 Prospect Boulevard
- Gladstone - 335 North Elmwood Avenue
- Hartman - 8111 Oak Street
- Hale Cook - 7302 Pennsylvania Avenue
- James - 5810 Scarritt Avenue
- Martin Luther King Elementary School - 4201-A Indiana Avenue
- Melcher - 3958 Chelsea Avenue
- Wendell Phillips K-6 - 2400 Prospect Ave.
- Pitcher - 9915 East 38th Terrace
- J. A. Rogers - 6400 E. 23rd Street
- Success Academy at Knotts - 1701 Jackson Avenue
- Trailwoods - 6201 E. 17th Street
- Wheatley - 2415 Agnes Avenue
- Whittier - 1012 Bales Avenue

==== Persons or places neighborhood elementary schools are named after ====
- Banneker: Benjamin Banneker (1731–1806), free African-American surveyor and almanac author
- Garcia: Primitivo Garcia (1943–1967), Mexican-American hero
- Garfield: James A. Garfield, (1831–1881), 20th President of the United States
- Gladstone: named after Gladstone Road.
- Hartman: John T. Hartman, Presbyterian missionary
- Hale Cook: Hale Cook (1857–?), Kansas City, Missouri, school board president
- James: J. Crawford James (?—1933), Kansas City, Missouri, school board president
- Martin Luther King: Martin Luther King Jr. (1929–1968), African-American minister and civil rights leader
- Melcher: George Melcher, Kansas City Public Schools Superintendent
- Wendell Phillips: Wendell Phillips (1811–1884), American abolitionist
- Pitcher: Thomas Pitcher (ca. 1806—1886), Jackson County, Missouri, landowner and sheriff
- J.A. Rogers: Joel Augustus Rogers (1880—1966), Jamaican-American author, journalist, and historian
- Wheatley: Phyllis Wheatley (c.1753—1784), first African-American author of a published book of poetry
- Whittier: John Greenleaf Whittier (1807—1892), American poet and abolitionist

==== Signature ====
- Carver Dual Language - 4600 Elmwood Avenue
- Border Star Montessori - 6321 Wornall Road
- Faxon Montessori - 1320 East 32nd Terrace
- Foreign Language Academy - 3450 Warwick Boulevard
- Holliday Montessori - 7227 Jackson Avenue

==== Persons signature schools are named after ====
- Carver Dual Language: George Washington Carver (c. 1864—1943), African-American agricultural scientist and inventor
- Faxon Montessori: Frank A. Faxon (1848—1912), Kansas City board of education member
- Holliday Montessori: Harold 'Doc' Holliday Sr. (1918—1985), Kansas City attorney and civil rights activist

=== Preschools ===
- Woodland Early Learning Center - 711 Woodland Avenue
- Richardson Early Learning Center - 3515 Park Avenue

== Former schools ==
=== Closed to K-8 transition ===
- J.S. Chick - 4101 East 53rd Street

=== Closed ===
High schools

- Southwest High School (Kansas City) - closed in 1998
- West High School (Kansas City) - closed in the 1980s
- Westport High School - 315 East 39th Street; closed in 2010
- Southwest Early College Campus - 6512 Wornall Road; closed in 2016.

Elementary and middle schools

- Horace Mann Elementary School
- Switzer School
- West Junior High School
- Switzer Annex (Kansas City) - closed in 1979

Middle Schools

- Bingham Junior High School (Kansas City) - closed in 2002
- Kansas City Middle School of the Arts - 4848 Woodland Avenue
- Paul Robeson Middle School (Kansas City) - became a classical Greek magnet school in 1990 and a regular middle school in 1998; closed in 2004
- Westport Middle School - 300 East 39th Street

Primary schools

- Askew - 2630 Topping Avenue
- Bancroft Elementary School (Kansas City) - opened as a one-room school house in 1904, closed in 2000
- Blenheim - 2411 East 70th Terrace
- Cook - 7302 Pennsylvania Avenue
- R.J. DeLano - 3708 East Linwood Boulevard - served students with special needs
- Douglas - 2640 Bellview Avenue
- East Elementary School - 6400 East 23rd Street
- Benjamin Franklin - 1325 Washington Street - opened in 1900, closed in 1973
- C. A. Franklin - 3400 Highland Avenue
- Greenwood School (Kansas City) - opened in 1900, closed in 1997
- Knotts - 7301 Jackson Avenue
- Henry C. Kumpf
- Ladd - 3640 Benton Boulevard
- Longan - 3421 Cherry Street
- Longfellow-
- Nelson School - the building is now part of UMKC, and is called "Grant Hall"
- Norman School (Kansas City) - opened in 1901; Kansas City's first stone exterior building; located in the Valentine neighborhood; the building served as a teacher resource center after being a school; the building closed in 2005
- Manchester School (Kansas City) - joined the Kansas City district in 1899; the final building, which opened in 1920, was delayed due to World War I
- Moore - 4510 East Linwood Boulevard
- Northeast Elementary School - 4904 Independence Avenue
- Pinkerton - 6409 Agnes Avenue
- Scarritt - 3509 Anderson Avenue
- Seven Oaks Elementary School (Kansas City) - was in its own school district before Kansas City annexed it in 1913; named after Sevenoaks in England; closed in 2003
- E F Swinney built in 1914 at 1106 W 47th closed 1998 now apartments. Original home of Plaza Library.
- Thacher Elementary School (Kansas City) - originally built in 1900, the facility was closed in the 1990s after being an annex to Northeast Middle School; for one year it served as an eighth grade center before closing in the summer of 2009; the former school was damaged by a fire in 2011
- Troost-
- Weeks - 4201 Indiana Avenue
- West Rock Creek - 8820 East 27th Street
- Frances Willard School (Kansas City) - closed in 1998
- Woodland - 711 Woodland Avenue

=== Transferred to Independence School District ===
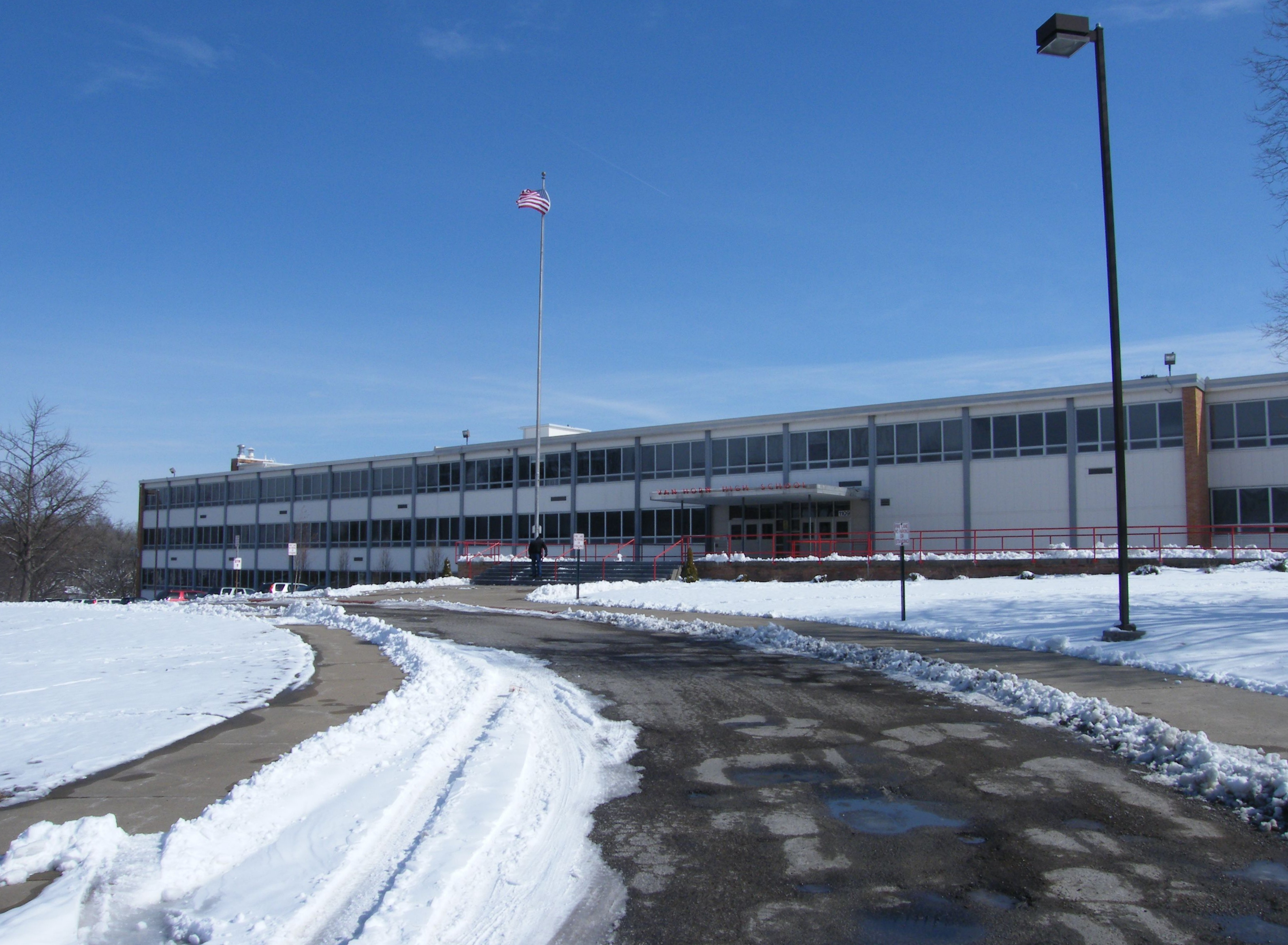
Van Horn High School prior to the 2011 renovations

- Van Horn High School (Independence)
- Nowlin Middle School (Independence)
- Fairmount Elementary (Independence)
- Mt. Washington Elementary (Independence)
- North Rock Creek/Korte Elementary (Independence)
- Sugar Creek Elementary (Sugar Creek)
- Three Trails Elementary (Independence)

=== Closed and later transferred ===
Primary and alternative schools

- C. R. Anderson School (Independence) - originally called the Pitcher School; KCMSD annexed it in 1957; became an alternative school for troubled students in the 1980s; closed in 2000; was transferred to the Independence School District in 2008
