= Paseo Academy =

Location
- 4747 Flora Avenue; Kansas City, Missouri 64110; USA; 39°02′20″N 94°33′56″W

Information
- Type: Public
- Established: 1926
- School district: KCPS
- Principal: Tyrone Bates
- Teaching staff: 59.81 (FTE)
- Grades: 7–12
- Enrollment: 677 (2023-2024)
- Student to teacher ratio: 11.32
- Color
- Mascot: Pirate
- Website: kcpublicschools.org/paseo

Paseo Academy, also referred to as Paseo Academy of Fine and Performing Arts and sometimes Paseo High School, is a magnet performing arts high school located at 4747 Flora Avenue in Kansas City, Missouri. It is part of the Kansas City Public Schools.

== Background ==
Paseo Academy is named for Paseo Boulevard, a main street in Kansas City, which is one block west of the school. The school sits on top of a hill with the Kansas City Middle School of the Arts behind it. The old Paseo High School building, designed by Charles A. Smith in 1924 and completed on September 9, 1926, was demolished on November 28, 1990. It was not a performing arts school until the current building was built.

Paseo Academy was formerly Paseo High School, which served the Blue Hills neighborhood.

During the 1960s, Paseo High School experienced rapid "white flight" and had a predominantly African American student body in the 1970s.

== Notable alumni ==
- Jeff Cook, former Major League Baseball player-Pittsburgh Pirates, St. Louis Cardinals (1985-1998) holds track and field records in 100m10.4 and 200m 21.4
- Joanna Drozda, actress, theatre director, and playwright
- Brian Kennedy, music producer
- Dick Kenworthy, former MLB player
- Lil' Ronnie, music producer
- Robert Long, admiral
- Robert Lowery, actor
- Angyil McNeal, world champion hip-hop dancer
- Harold O'Neal, music composer
- Anthony Peeler, former NBA player
- Logan Richardson, musician and producer
- Nick Schnebelen, blues rock musician
- Craig Stevens, actor who portrayed Peter Gunn
- Lucian Piane, musician, composer
