= East High School (Missouri) =

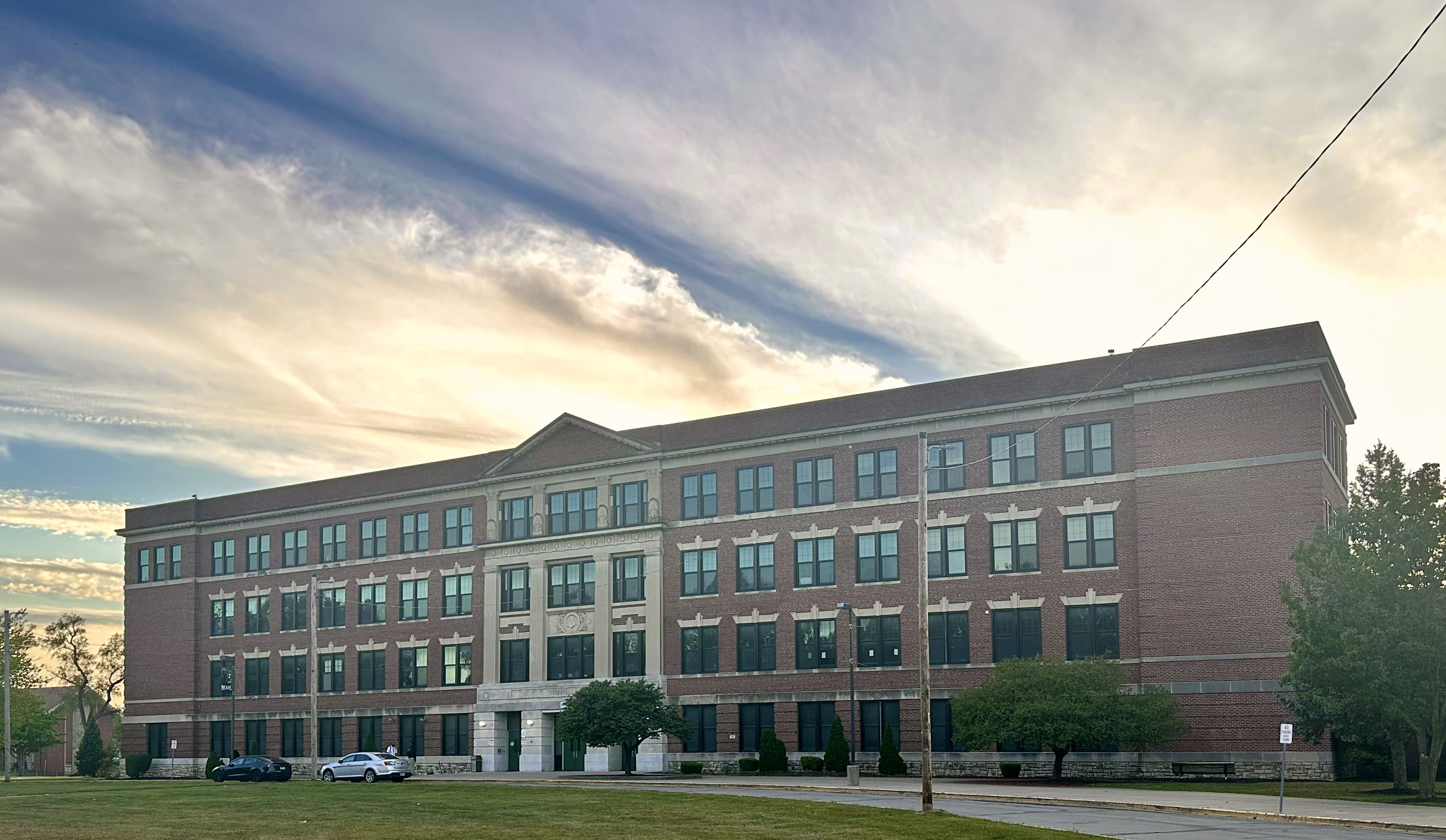
- 2025

Location
- 1924 Van Brunt Blvd; Kansas City, Missouri 64127; United States; 39°05′17″N 94°31′16″W

Information
- Type: Public
- Established: 1925; 101 years ago
- School district: Kansas City Public Schools
- NCES School ID: 291640000880
- Principal: Geoffrey Talboy
- Teaching staff: 73.42 (FTE)
- Grades: 9-12
- Enrollment: 1,155 (2024–2025)
- Student to teacher ratio: 15.73
- Colors: Black and Green
- Athletics conference: Interscholastic League
- Mascot: Bear
- Website: east.kcpublicschools.org

East High School is a comprehensive high school located at 1924 Van Brunt Boulevard in Kansas City, Missouri. It is part of the Kansas City Public Schools.

== History ==
East High School first opened in 1925. For the 2007–2008 school year, the building was used to house East Elementary School, which served grades K–8.

In November 2007, voters approved a boundary change that transferred seven schools from Kansas City Public Schools to the Independence Public School District, including the nearby Van Horn High School. Following this transfer, East was reestablished as a high school for the 2008–2009 school year, serving residents of eastern portions of the district who were previously served by Van Horn.

== Notable alumni ==
- Gene Roberts, football running back for the New York Giants

== See also ==
- Northeast High School (Missouri), a nearby KCPS high school
