= Westport High School (Missouri) =

Location
- 315 East 39th Street; Kansas City, Missouri 64111; United States; 39.055923°N 94.582019°W

Information
- Type: Public
- Motto: "Where Education Is Our Priority"
- Established: 1907
- Closed: 2010
- School district: KCMSD
- Superintendent: John Covington
- Grades: 9-12
- Colors: Blue and Gold
- Athletics: Football; Basketball; Volleyball; Cross Country; Track and Field
- Nickname: Tigers
- Rival: Central High School
- Newspaper: The Crier
- Yearbook: The Herald

Westport High School was a public high school located at 315 East 39th Street in Kansas City, Missouri. It was part of the Kansas City, Missouri School District. A trowel was used to lay the cornerstone of the school on June 8, 1907. The Class of 1957 presented a frame with the exact trowel on October 6, 2007 to coincide with their 50th anniversary and the 100th anniversary of the school. Westport closed in 2010; its building was listed on the National Register of Historic Places in 2015.

== History ==
The school was established in the 19th century, moving into its own building in 1891 with an 1897 addition coming subsequently, and joining the Kansas City school system in 1898 as Westport was annexed to Kansas City. The high school was across the street from Westport Middle School and it opened in the fall of 1908. It was considered the finest school in Kansas City and among the finest in the county, at a cost of nearly $500,000, and built of stone and vitrified brick.

Westport High School was the last school to become Achievement First in 2009-2010. The purpose was to prepare students for post-secondary education and high-quality careers.

=== Primitivo Garcia ===
Primitivo Garcia was a 23 year old Mexican immigrant who attended night classes at Westport High to learn English and become an American citizen. As class was letting out on November 15, 1967, a pregnant teacher, Margaret Kelso was attacked on the street by a gang of teenagers who stole her purse. Garcia and his brother Alfredo pulled the attackers off the woman and began fighting. Primitivo was shot once by the assailants and later died in the hospital from his wounds. His bravery was widely praised by the city and on the 25th anniversary of his death, an elementary school was named in his honor.

=== School closing ===
Westport High closed on June 3, 2010, because of school district Superintendent John Covington's right-sizing plan to close almost 30 schools. Mr. Harold Hawkins was the last principal of Westport High due to the school closing. He was called out of retirement to become principal on April 7, 2009.

After Westport closed in 2010, Southwest Early College Campus took the attendance zone of Westport.

=== Transformation into apartment complex ===
In April 2024, the building reopened as a luxury apartment complex called Residences at Park 39 with 138 units. The former high school is part of a 16-acre mixed use development called Park 39. Westport Middle School has been converted into office space as part of the Park 39 project.

=== Yearbook ===
The Herald was the name of the school yearbook.

The 2007-2008 yearbook was the first yearbook to be a DVD. The 2008-2009 yearbook was the second yearbook to be a DVD and the first in HD.

=== Newspaper ===
The Weekly Crier was the name of the school newspaper.

=== Student activities ===
- Student Council
- National Honor Society
- JROTC
- Drill Team
- Choir
- Debate
- Cheerleading
- Tutoring
- Various stage activities

Westport's last ROTC programs or drill teams were in the mid to late 1960s. There was a chapter of the Future Teachers of America.

== Principal ==
=== Partners in community service ===
Westport High School and Herndon Career Center were partners in community service with SkillsUSA, FBLA, and FCCLA. April 28, 2007 marked the first community service project for Westport and Herndon Career Center from Raytown, Missouri. The theme was "Restoring Westport High". April 19, 2008 marked the second community service project for both schools. The theme was "Schools Helping Schools."

== Notable alumni ==
- Sumner Blossom, editor of American Magazine
- Walt Bodine, Kansas City broadcaster
- Betty Caywood, 1948, one of first female MLB radio commentators when she was at the mike for Kansas City Athletics broadcasts in 1964
- Friz Freleng, 1923, animator and film director for Warner Bros. Cartoons and others
- Eilene Galloway (1923), space law researcher and editor
- Hugh Harman, 1922, animator, film director, and producer. Created Looney Tunes and Merrie Melodies.
- Ewing Kauffman, 1934, pharmaceutical executive and owner of Kansas City Royals
- Bob O'Brien, professional basketball player
- Bruce Pickens, former professional American football player, NFL Draft 1991 / Round: 1 / Pick: 3
- Brandon Rush, NBA guard for Golden State Warriors
