= Harold Holliday Sr. =

American politician

Member of the U.S. House of Representatives from Missouri's 5th, 14th, and 26th district

Missouri House of Representatives
- Incumbent
- Assumed office 1964

Personal details
- Born: 1918 Muskogee, Oklahoma, US
- Died: 1985 (aged 66–67)
- Party: Democratic
- Education: Lincoln University (bachelor's degree), University of Michigan (master's degree, economics), University of Missouri–Kansas City (law degree)

Harold Holliday Sr. (June 28, 1918 - March 21, 1985) was a civil rights activist, economist, army officer, judge, and Democratic politician who served 12 years in the Missouri House of Representatives.

== Early life ==
Harold Holliday was born in Muskogee, Oklahoma in 1918. He moved to Kansas City, Missouri with his mother Eliza and his sister Isola when he was two years old. He attended Dunbar Elementary School and graduated from Lincoln High School in 1935. He earned a bachelor's degree from Lincoln University in Jefferson City, Missouri in 1939, and a master's degree in economics from the University of Michigan in 1941. In 1952, he was the first African-American to receive a law degree from the school which would become the University of Missouri–Kansas City.

== Career ==
Holliday served in the U.S. Army Corps of Engineers from September 26, 1942, until November 1945, as a second lieutenant in the European theater. He represented the 5th, 14th, and 26th districts in the Missouri House of Representatives from 1964 to 1974. He was known for his passionate oratory skills and his progressive legislations. He founded Freedom, Inc., a black political organization in Jackson County, Missouri.

== Death ==
Holliday died of prostate cancer in 1985.
