= Manual Career & Technical Center =

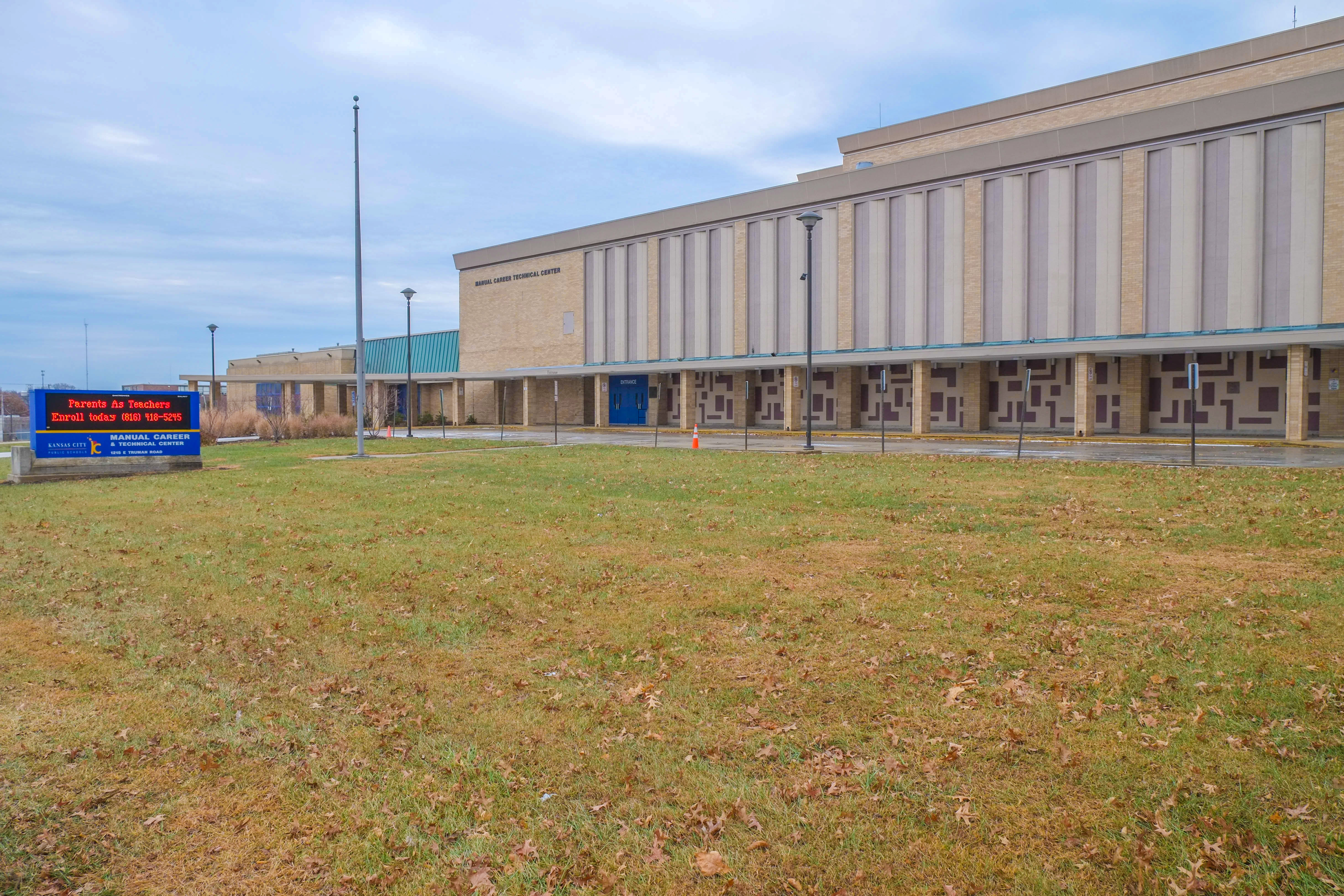
- Manual Career & Technical Center, December 2016

Location
- Main Campus; 1215 East Truman Road; Kansas City, Missouri 64106; East Campus; 1924 Van Brunt Boulevard; Kansas City, Missouri 64127; United States; 39°05′40″N 94°34′05″W

Information
- Type: Public
- Grades: 11–12
- Website: manual.kcpublicschools.org/o/manual

Manual Career & Technical Center, Manual, or Vo-Tech is a career and technical center located in Kansas City, Missouri, United States. The Main Campus is located at 1215 East Truman Road. The East Campus is located at 1924 Van Brunt Boulevard at East High School. They are both a part of the Kansas City, Missouri School District.

== History ==
Manual High School was a vocational high school which opened in the late 1800s. The original Manual High School was located at the current address.

After the Brown v. Board of Education decision to end segregation in schools, Manual Vocational High School was one of the first high schools in the KCSD to desegregate. After desegregation, Manual Vocational High School rapidly resegregated from an all-white student body to mostly African-American within a few years.

Manual served neighborhoods north of downtown, such as Guinotte Manor and Chateou Homes, and neighborhoods nearby, such as T.B Watkins Homes, Wayne Minor Homes, Parade Park, and Parker Square Homes.

The original building closed after the 1968–1969 school year. Manual High School was then relocated to the former Kansas City Junior College building, located across the street from Westport High School, while the original building was torn down and was replaced with the current building.

Manual High School was closed after the 1977–1978 school year. Many of its former students were sent to Northeast High School, Southwest High School, Lincoln High School, and other high schools in the KCSD.

It was situated in the same building with Southeast High School at the Main Campus.

== Programs ==
Manual Career & Technical Center offers 15 career and technical programs at two sites. Main Campus offers 11 programs and East Campus offers four. With successful completion of a designated program, an MCTC student might be eligible for articulated or dual college credit and access employment placement services. MCTC programs are designed for 12th-grade focused students who have demonstrated interests in career paths that include skill development in MCTC offerings.

== Notable alumni ==
- S. Herbert Hare, landscape architect
