= Missouri v. Jenkins =

- Supreme Court of the United States

Argued January 11, 1995 Decided June 12, 1995
- Full case name: State of Missouri, et al. v. Kalima Jenkins, et al.
- Citations: 515 U.S. 70 (more) 115 S. Ct. 2038; 132 L. Ed. 2d 63; 1995 U.S. LEXIS 4041

Case history
- Prior: Declaratory judgment, 593 F. Supp. 1485 (W.D. Mo. 1984); final appealable order, 639 F. Supp. 19 (W.D. Mo. 1984); affirmed, 855 F.2d 1295 (8th Cir. 1988); reversed, 495 U.S. 33 (1990); new orders affirmed, 11 F.3d 755 (8th Cir. 1993).
- Subsequent: appeal after remand, 103 F.3d 731 (8th Cir. 1997).

Holding
- The District Court's school desegregation orders, which required the State of Missouri to fund across-the-board salary increases and to continue to fund remedial education programs, went beyond the court's remedial authority.

Court membership
- Chief Justice William Rehnquist Associate Justices John P. Stevens · Sandra Day O'Connor; Antonin Scalia · Anthony Kennedy; David Souter · Clarence Thomas; Ruth Bader Ginsburg · Stephen Breyer

Case opinions
- Majority: Rehnquist, joined by O'Connor, Scalia, Kennedy, Thomas
- Concurrence: O'Connor
- Concurrence: Thomas
- Dissent: Souter, joined by Stevens, Ginsburg, Breyer
- Dissent: Ginsburg

Missouri v. Jenkins, 515 U.S. 70 (1995), is a case decided by the United States Supreme Court. On June 12, 1995 the Court, in a 5–4 decision, reversed a district court ruling that required the state of Missouri to correct intentional racial discrimination in Kansas City schools by funding salary increases and remedial education programs.

== Background ==
The case began in 1977, when a group of students and the Kansas City, Missouri School District (KCMSD) sued the State of Missouri, federal agencies, and suburban districts around Kansas City on behalf of the district's students. The district court then instead named the KCMSD school district as a defendant. The courts held that the state of Missouri was liable for segregated schools within the boundaries of KCMSD. Originally, the plaintiffs and the KCMSD school district wanted a "metropolitan plan," which would have included bus transfers to integrate and remedy the racial inequalities of inner-city and suburban schools. However, over the 18-year span of the case, the court ordered remedies that were focused instead on improving educational facilities and programs inside KCMSD.

In 1985, US District Court Judge Russell Clark ordered the legal remedy of educational improvement programs, school facility repairs, and magnet schools, which were thought to be the best way to attract white suburban students back into city schools. In 1987, the district courts ordered mandatory salary assistance, arguing that to end segregation in the schools the district needed higher-paid, quality teachers.

The U.S. Supreme Court ruled in this case twice earlier. First, in 1989, to address attorneys fees. Then, in 1990, the Supreme Court addressed whether a federal court could order a local government to raise taxes above the state statute amount to cover the cost of removing the "vestiges of discrimination." The Supreme Court ruled that while direct imposition of taxes is indeed beyond judicial authority, the district court could order the school district to levy the same tax: "Authorizing and directing local government institutions to devise and implement remedies not only protects the function of these institutions but, to the extent possible, also places the responsibility for solutions to the problems of segregation upon those themselves who have created the problem." The Supreme Court added, "To hold otherwise would fail to take account of the obligations of local governments, under the Supremacy Clause, to fulfill the requirements that the Constitution imposes upon them."

Later, on remand in 1993, the district court ordered the state to pay for salary increases for teaching and non-teaching personnel.

== Decision ==
The Supreme Court majority interpreted Brown v. Board of Education as restricting only de jure segregation and referred to Milliken v. Bradley and other precedents as applying only to intra-district desegregation. The Supreme Court argued that the lower courts had exceeded their authority in ordering measures such as across-the-board state-funded salary increases to fund continued quality education programs, which could not be sustained by local government.

The Court looked to Board of Education of Oklahoma City Public Schools v. Dowell for the decisive question of "'whether the [constitutional violator] ha[s] complied in good faith with the desegregation decree since it was entered, and whether the vestiges of past discrimination ha[ve] been eliminated to the extent practicable.'"

== See also ==
- List of United States Supreme Court cases, volume 515
- List of United States Supreme Court cases
- Lists of United States Supreme Court cases by volume
- List of United States Supreme Court cases by the Rehnquist Court
