= Melvin Dwork =

American designer and activist

- Born: February 9, 1922; Kansas City, Missouri, U.S.
- Died: June 14, 2016 (aged 94); New York City, U.S.
- Education: Southeast High School; Kansas City Art Institute; Parsons School of Design
- Occupation: Interior designer
- Partner: John Butler
- Parent(s): Henry Dwork; Esther Brown

Melvin Dwork (February 9, 1922 – June 14, 2016) was an American interior designer and LGBT activist. He was discharged from the United States Navy in World War II for his homosexuality. He eventually had his dishonorable discharge changed to honorable in 2011. Following the war, he studied design and won several awards.

== Early life and education ==
Dwork was born on February 9, 1922, at Kansas City, Missouri, to parents Henry Dwork and the former Esther Brown. After graduating from Southeast High School in 1939, he spent two years as a student at the Kansas City Art Institute.

Dwork then attended the Parsons School of Design in New York City in 1941 and 1942.

== Adult life ==
During World War II, Dwork served in the U.S. Navy and then applied for officer candidate school. In 1944, he began classes at the Medical University of South Carolina in Charleston, South Carolina. After his partner was arrested and revealed that Dwork was his partner, military police arrested Dwork in Charleston in 1944. He was jailed, labeled "deviant" by psychiatrists and then discharged as "undesirable."

After leaving the Navy, Dwork returned to New York City and went on to become a successful interior designer in New York City. He took classes at the Parsons School of Design, worked for antique dealers and worked alongside Yale Burge in the 1960s and James Maguire in the 1970s before striking out on his own. Dwork was elected to the Interior Design Hall of Fame in 1993.

== Naval discharge status ==
Dwork spent years trying to remove his naval discharge status from "undesirable" to "honorable." With support from pro-gay and lesbian military employees and veterans, Dwork succeeded in winning that status change in 2011, shortly before the U.S. military ended its "don't ask, don't tell" policy. Dwork is thought to have been the first World War II veteran to expunge an "undesirable" discharge. The ruling entitled him to veterans benefits.

Filmmaker Michael Jacoby made a still-unreleased documentary, titled The Undesirable, about Dwork's case.

== Personal life ==
According to Dwork, he and choreographer John Butler were companions from 1961 until 1993, when Butler died.

Dwork lived in Manhattan until his death on June 14, 2016, at the age of 94. He was survived by a brother, Irvin.
