= Southwest Early College Campus =

Location
- 6512 Wornall Road; Kansas City, Missouri; United States; 39°00′35″N 94°35′39″W

Information
- Type: Public
- Established: 1927, August 2008
- Closed: May 17, 2016
- School district: KCMSD
- Grades: 7–12
- Enrollment: 376 (2015-16)
- Colors: Orange and black
- Mascot: Indian
- Website: kcpublicschools.org/southwest

Southwest Early College Campus, often shortened to Southwest, was a university preparatory middle school and high school campus located at 6512 Wornall Road in Kansas City, Missouri, 64113, United States. It was part of the Kansas City, Missouri School District. The school closed on May 17, 2016.

== School background ==
Southwest Early College Campus was founded as Southwest High School of the district. It was in the Brookside neighborhood at 65th and Wornall, only two blocks from what is now Border Star Montessori.

Students had the opportunity to take college-level courses with the potential to earn from 20 to 60 college credits and prepare for the rigors of college through a mix of training and relationships with professors and master teachers from the University of Missouri-Kansas City. By the time a student graduated from Southwest, they would have earned those hours of college credit from the university.

The Southwest campus allowed students to utilize an on-site planetarium and science laboratories. The school offered a project-based curriculum with extended-day and extended-year opportunities.

The school opened in August 2008 for students in the 6th and 9th grade. The school later added grades 6, 7, 9, and 10.

The Early College Campus started with 240 students, and added approximately another 240 every year.

After the closure of Westport High School in 2010, Southwest Early College Campus took over the attendance zone of Westport.

== Partnerships ==
In late 2011, the school's partner institutions announced they would discontinue working with the school as they saw it as being unable to meet its obligations.

- Kansas City, Missouri School District
- UMKC
- Woodrow Wilson National Fellowship Foundation
- PREP-KC (Partnership for Regional Education Preparation - Kansas City)
- Kansas City Area Life Sciences Institute
- Donnelly College
