= Lincoln College Preparatory Academy =

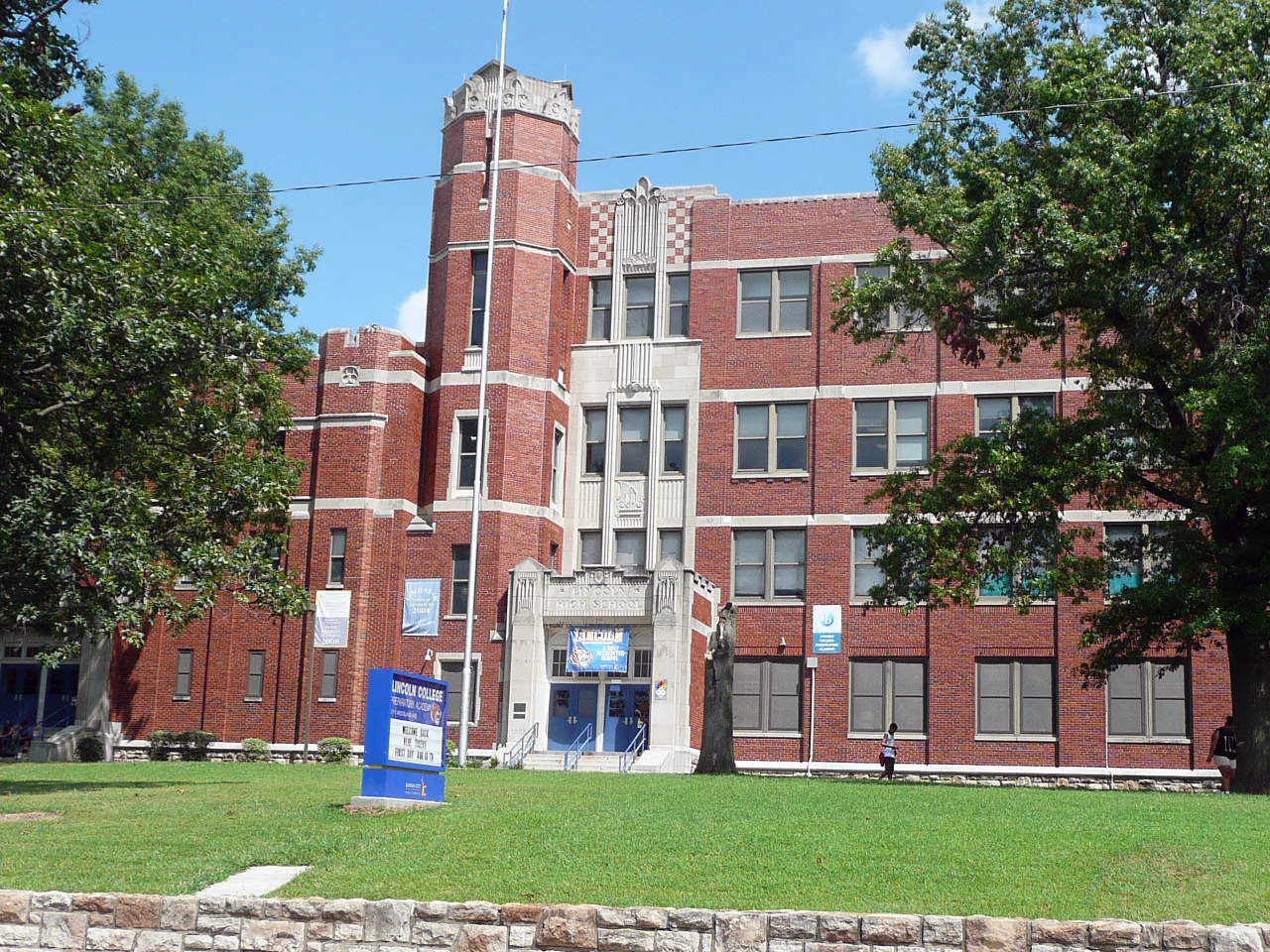

Location
- 2111 Woodland Avenue; Kansas City, Missouri 64108; United States; 39.087°N 94.56°W

Information
- Type: Public high school
- Established: 1865 as Lincoln High School, renamed LCPA in 1986
- School district: Kansas City Public Schools 33
- Teaching staff: 49.90 (FTE)
- Grades: 9–12
- Enrollment: 997 (2024–2025)
- Student to teacher ratio: 19.98
- Colors: Blue and Gold
- Athletics conference: Interscholastic League
- Mascot: Blue Tiger
- Nickname: The Castle on The Hill
- National ranking: 388th (2025–2026)
- Website: lcpa.kcpublicschools.org

Lincoln College Preparatory Academy (LCPA) (also known as Lincoln Prep Academy or The Castle on the Hill) is a three-year middle school and four-year college preparatory magnet school in the Kansas City, Missouri School District. The high school offers International Baccalaureate programs. Founded as a school for African Americans in 1865, it became a high school in 1890. It was not integrated until 1978 when it became a magnet school. The student body is now mostly black and hispanic. Less than 20 percent of students are white.

Lincoln was ranked by U.S. News & World Report as one of the "Top 100 High Schools" in the United States in 2012 and 2015. In 2008 and 2014, the school received the Blue Ribbon School Award of Excellence by the United States Department of Education, the highest award an American school can receive.

In 2015, the academy was named the best public school in the State of Missouri.

== History ==
The first school in Lincoln College Prep's lineage was founded in Kansas City, Missouri in 1865. Students were educated at a church. In 1890, under the leadership of Principal Gabriel N. Grisham, Lincoln became and moved into a high school.

Beginning in 1908, the high school was located at 19th and Tracy Avenue, now 1300 East 19th street. The school moved into an expanded facility at 2111 Woodland Avenue in 1936 under the leadership of Principal Hugh O. Cook. Lincoln High School remained an all-black school through most of segregation. Garrison School in Liberty stopped at 10th grade so atudents had to take buses to Kansas City and attend Lincoln High School in order to continue their education.

In 1978, the student body was integrated and the institution obtained a magnet school designation operating under the name Lincoln Academy for Accelerated Study. The name was changed to Lincoln College Preparatory Academy in 1986.

== Academics ==
Lincoln College Preparatory Academy is a high school. More than 90% of its graduates enroll in college. The 2014 graduating class of 151 students received $15.6 million in scholarships, grants and financial aid. High achievement has been consistent, as the 115 graduates in 2002 received scholarships and financial aid in excess of $3 million. The student-teacher ratio is 14.0:1.

== Athletics ==
The Lincoln Blue Tigers actively participate in the following sports:

- Baseball
- Boys' basketball
- Girls' basketball
- Cheerleading
- Dance
- Cross country
- Football
- Soccer
- Softball
- Swimming
- Tennis
- Track and field
- Volleyball
- Wrestling

== Extracurricular activities ==
- Art Club
- Band
- Black Student Union
- Chamber Choir
- Concert Choir
- Debate
- Drama Club
- FIRST Robotics Competition
- Jazz Band
- JROTC
- Key Club
- Math Club
- Muslim student Association
- National Honor Society
- Orchestra
- Poetry Club
- Spanish Honor Society
- Student Council
- Wind Ensemble
- First Priority
- K-Pop Club
- Asian Student Union
- Dungeons & Dragons Club
- Gender Sexuality Alliance
- Photography Club
- Model UN Club
- Crochet Club

== Notable alumni ==
- Ida M. Bowman Becks, class of 1899, renowned lecturer, clubwoman, suffragist, and civil rights activist
- Lucile Bluford, an African-American civil rights advocate and former editor of the Kansas City Call
- Charles Harris, former NFL player
- Jeff Hurd, former NFL player
- Florynce Kennedy, an American lawyer and civil rights advocate
- Bill Myles, former college football coach and administrator
- Charlie Parker, American jazz saxophonist
- Reaner Shannon, medical technologist and dean at UMKC School of Medicine
- Vernon Vanoy, former NFL and University of Kansas football player
- Robert Wedgeworth, librarian and founding President of ProLiteracy Worldwide, an adult literacy organization
- Greg Westbrooks, former NFL player
- Rachel Wilson, neurobiologist, MacArthur Fellowship winner, and member of the National Academy of Sciences
