= Van Horn High School (Missouri) =

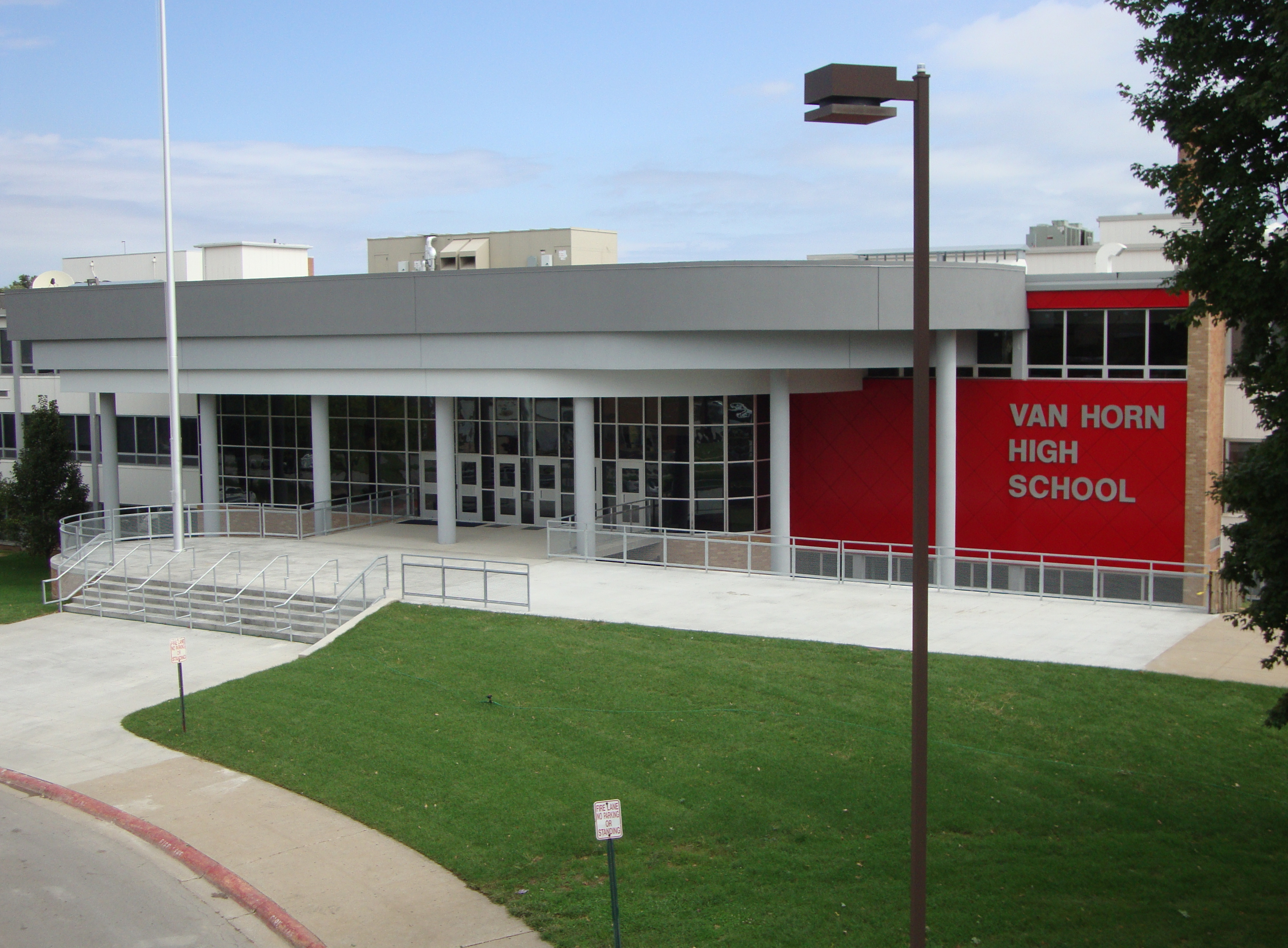
- The school after the 2011 renovation

Location
- 1109 S. Arlington; Independence, Missouri; United States; 39°5′47″N 94°27′47″W

Information
- Type: Public
- Motto: Sapere Aude - Dare To Be Wise
- Established: 1955
- School district: Independence School District (2008-present); Kansas City, Missouri School District (1955-2008)
- Principal: Justin Woods
- Staff: 61.31 (on an FTE basis)
- Grades: 9–12
- Enrollment: 1,113 (2023–24)
- Student to teacher ratio: 18.15
- Colours: Red and Gray
- Athletics conference: Crossroads Conference
- Nickname: Falcon
- Yearbook: The Falcon
- Website: sites.isdschools.org/vanhorn/

Van Horn High School is a public high school located at 1109 S. Arlington Ave. in Independence, Missouri, United States, in the Kansas City metropolitan area. As of 2008, it is part of the Independence School District. It previously was part of the Kansas City, Missouri School District when it opened in 1955.

== History ==
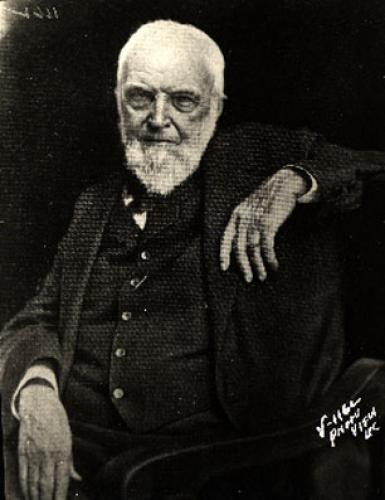
Robert T. Van Horn

Van Horn was originally constructed in 1955 on the site of "Honeywood", the house of former Civil War era Kansas City mayor Robert T. Van Horn, a prominent newspaper publisher and statesman. The area close to Van Horn is known as "Inner City" and was annexed by the city of Independence. Van Horn serves sections of Independence, Sugar Creek, and Blue Summit.

Van Horn opened in 1955 and its first class graduated in 1956. The school colors of gray and red were chosen by the first student council and the name "falcons" was selected because it was the mascot of the newly established U.S. Air Force Academy. The school was dubbed "The Factory" because of its new age metallic look that covered the exterior of the building. Patrons suggested that until the renovations of 2011, many people struggled to identify it as a school when they drove by as it looked much like a factory that one would see in an industrial area.

Van Horn was named the first "A+ designated school" of the Kansas City, Missouri School District. During the 1960s, continued to grow as many professionals and blue collar workers flocked to the area. The school ballooned to over 2000 students in the late 1960s and it became apparent that another high school was needed to ease overcrowding. A measure was put on the ballot for a new high school to be built at Cassell Park which was located in southwest Independence. The measure passed but the Kansas City School District decided to reallocate funds towards building a new middle school in another part of the city. Patrons suggested that this caused a great deal of frustration and planted the seeds for animosity between the community and the Kansas City School District.

At an attempt to compete with urban sprawl, the KCSD began busing students to Van Horn from all parts of Kansas City. This program led to students attending Van Horn who were not from the community. As the building and school spirit deteriorated, the school began to drop off academically during the 1980s. Time magazine conducted a story in which they called it one of America's "Dropout Factories." This was an instance in which the school's nickname was no longer flattering. The school continued to see a steady decline in attendance and academic progress throughout the 1990s.

=== 2008 change of district ===
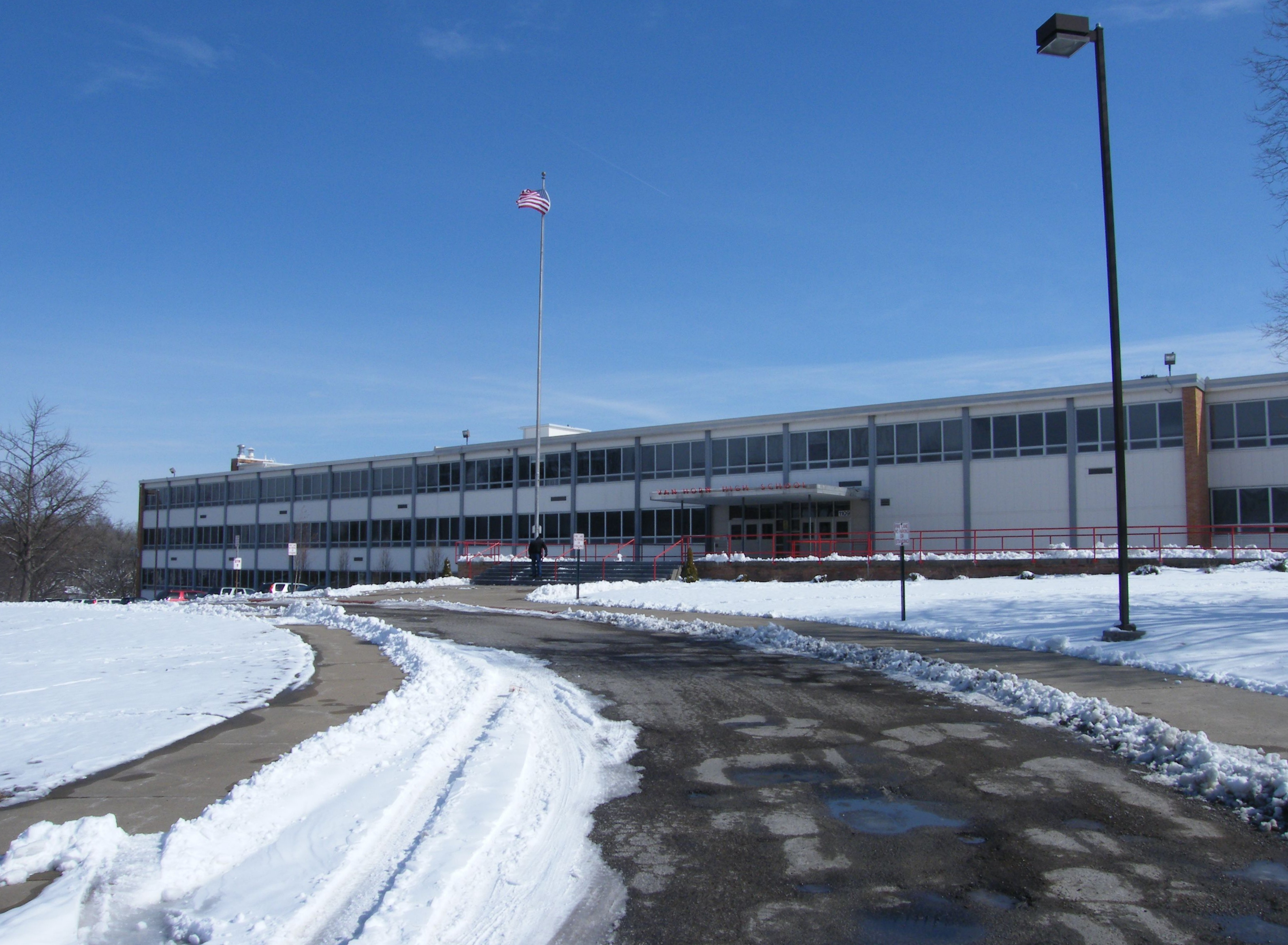
Van Horn prior to the renovation

In November 2007, the voters of Independence, the city in which Van Horn and its feeder schools are located, and Kansas City, the district that housed the school, voted for Van Horn, its feeder middle school, and three elementary schools to be taken over by the Independence School District. The change was made because of the poor performance of the Kansas City Missouri school district. Independence won after an election and a court battle.

Kansas City students formerly assigned to Van Horn were transferred to East High School, formerly East Elementary School.

=== 2018 building expansion ===
In 2017, the voters of the Independence School District unanimously passed a no-tax increase bond. This bond allowed for expansion at Van Horn. Construction began on a brand new competition gym which was located just east of the existing school. In addition to locker rooms and a new concession stand, this structure also provided a mezzanine suitable for the school's wrestling program. Van Horn also added a culinary kitchen and a metal shop which allowed the school to become the hub for these programs for the district's academy program. A new practice athletics field was also created just to the north of the Truman Road bridge. On the north side of Van Horn, the old "E" Building was destroyed and additional parking was added.

== Robotics ==
The school district's FIRST Robotics Competition team, Team 1723 the FBI (First Bots of Independence), was founded in 2006. The student members from all three ISD high schools meet almost all year round at William Chrisman High school. The FBI is also active in the ISD community; many members from the team mentor ISD middle school and elementary school FIRST LEGO League teams and host an annual FIRST Lego League tournament at George Caleb Bingham Middle School.

Van Horn also had a separate robotics team, Team 1981 - The Gearheads, before being taken over by Independence School District and combining teams.

== Notable alumni ==
- Tim Ballard (Class of 1966) - Kansas Music Hall of Fame vocalist, trumpeter, and saxophonist, inducted in 2008 as a member of the Capitol Records soul band, Garry Mac and the Mac Truque (1968-1971).
- Travis O'Guinn - CEO and co-owner of Strange Music
- Rick Sutcliffe - 1979 NL Rookie of the Year, 1984 Cy Young Award winner, three-time All Star
