= Southeast High School (Missouri) =

Location
- Kansas City, Missouri; USA; 39°05′40″N 94°34′05″W

Information
- Type: Public
- Established: 1937
- School district: KCMSD
- Teaching staff: 33.47 (FTE)
- Grades: 9-12
- Enrollment: 531 (2023–2024)
- Student to teacher ratio: 15.86
- Colors: Red and blue
- Athletics conference: Interscholastic League
- Mascot: Knight
- Website: www.kcpublicschools.org/o/southeast

Southeast High School is a high school located at 3500 East Meyer Boulevard in Kansas City, Missouri, United States. It is part of the Kansas City, Missouri School District. It was previously located at 3500 East Meyer Boulevard in the 2006-2007 school year. It was in the same building as Manual Career & Technical Center.

== School background ==
Southeast High School was founded in 1937 at 3500 East Meyer Boulevard, and is currently the African Centered Education Collegium Campus. The new magnet school was established as a means to reconnect African-American students with African traditions. The school mascot is the Scarlet Knight.

Southeast had been a KCMO public high school from the 1930s until it was reestablished in 1997. The mascot was simply "the Knights." Until the late 1960s, most of the students were white. As more black families moved from the inner city to the more middle-class southeastern section of KC, white families began to flee to the suburbs. As a result, Southeast's student body rapidly changed to majority black by the early 1970s.

For the 2016-17 school year, Southeast was reopened, with the combination of Southwest Early College Campus, and African Centered College Preparatory Academy.

The school remains known as "Southeast High School", with the African Centered College Preparatory Academy being identified as a school within a school model.

== Notable alumni ==
- Bud Abell, American football linebacker in the American Football League, played for the Kansas City Chiefs
- Kevin Brown, author
- Melvin Dwork (class of 1939), LGBT activist
- Dorsey Golston III, The Arena League head coach
- June James (class of 1981), NFL player
- Terry McDaniel (class of 1985), Major League Baseball player
- Corky Taylor (class of 1951), NFL player
- Russ Washington (class of 1964), NFL player
