= Central High School (Kansas City, Missouri) =

Coordinates: 39.067°N 94.542°W

Location
- 3221 Indiana Avenue; Kansas City, Missouri; United States

Information
- Type: Public secondary
- Established: 1867
- School district: KCMSD/KCPS
- Principal: Anthony Holland, Jr.
- Teaching staff: 35.58 (on an FTE basis)
- Grades: 9–12
- Enrollment: 519 (2024-2025)
- Student to teacher ratio: 14.59
- Colors: Blue and White
- Athletics conference: Interscholastic League
- Nickname: Blue Eagles
- Yearbook: The Centralian
- Website: www.kcpublicschools.org/central

Central High School is a high school located at 3221 Indiana Avenue in Kansas City, Missouri. It is part of the Kansas City Public Schools. Central was established in 1867 in order to help educate the growing population of Kansas City. Formally located in downtown Kansas City, Missouri on 11th and Locust St, Central moved to its current location in 1912. The school colors are blue and white and the school's athletic teams are referred to as the "Eagles". Central has an enrollment of approximately 500 students annually.

== School background ==
The high school is located in west of Central Middle School building at the corner of Linwood Boulevard and Indiana Avenue. It features a large, one-acre square field house, Greek-style theatre, and an Olympic-sized swimming pool with one- and three- meter diving boards.

Central High School was also part of the now defunct magnet program which was a response to a court-mandated, forced desegregation plan that was designed to try and lure students from the suburbs with targeted programs. As part of this effort, Central High School was rebuilt and renamed to Central Computers Unlimited / Classical Greek Magnet High School.

The two magnet themes were not complementary to each other and most of the money spent on the new facility went to the Classical Greek theme for sports-related facilities like a fully outfitted weight room (inspired by the weight room of the Kansas City Chiefs), two indoor racquetball courts, a field house, a fully equipped gymnastics training facility, and an Olympic-sized swimming pool.

The Computers Unlimited theme brought with it a fully networked classroom environment with computers in most classrooms and a Novell NetWare v3.11 network. There was also a small robotics lab; a video, photography, and graphics lab; and a CAD lab. The cost to taxpayers for the new facility was over $32 million. It was completed in 1991. Unfortunately, the new facilities and programs were not enough to bring in and retain suburban students in this and other magnet program schools. The program was an abject failure by any measure and was abandoned. The references to the magnet themes were removed from the school's name, and it was returned to a normal curriculum.

== Name change ==
In July 2012, KCPS unanimously approved the proposal to change the school's name from Central High School to Central Academy of Excellence. The name change officially went into effect for the 2012–2013 school year. The proposal had been heavily promoted by the school's former principal Linda Collins, who strives "to put a new name on what the principal hopes will be a transformed school on the inside." There are also hopes for getting more technology into the classrooms and instilling stronger discipline. Central High School became the official name after the KCPS Board of Directors unanimously approved the change in 2019.

== Notable alumni ==
- Ralph Barton, 1920s cartoonist
- Kutt Calhoun, rapper signed with Strange Music
- George Creel, journalist and head of the WWI-era Committee on Public Information
- Robert A. Heinlein Science Fiction Author; Aeronautical Engineer; Naval Officer, Class of 1924
- Derek Hood, professional basketball player, class of 1995
- Muna Lee, Olympic sprinter, class of 2000
- Irene C. Peden, first female American engineer or scientist to conduct research in the Antarctic
- William Powell, actor; three-time nominee for Academy Award for Best Actor
- Joe Shannon, Representative for Missouri's 5th congressional district and Democratic political boss
- Lee Shippey, writer and columnist
- Casey Stengel, Hall of Fame Major League Baseball player and manager; led the New York Yankees to 7 World Series Championships
