= Independence Public School District =

School district in Missouri, U.S.

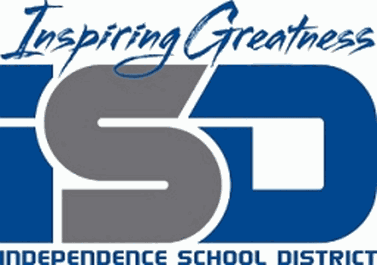

Location
- Independence, Missouri

District information
- Motto: Inspiring Greatness
- Grades: PreK - 12
- Schools: 29

Students and staff
- Students: 15,497 (K-12) and 2,000 (Pre-K) Total: 17,497

Other information
- Website: District website

Independence Public School District (usually referred to as the Independence School District, acronym is the ISD) is a school district headquartered in Independence, Missouri, United States. The district serves most of Independence and Sugar Creek, as well as Blue Summit and a portion of Kansas City.

== History ==
By 2023 the district made an incentive for more prospective teachers to work in the district by having school be four days per week instead of five.

== Schools ==
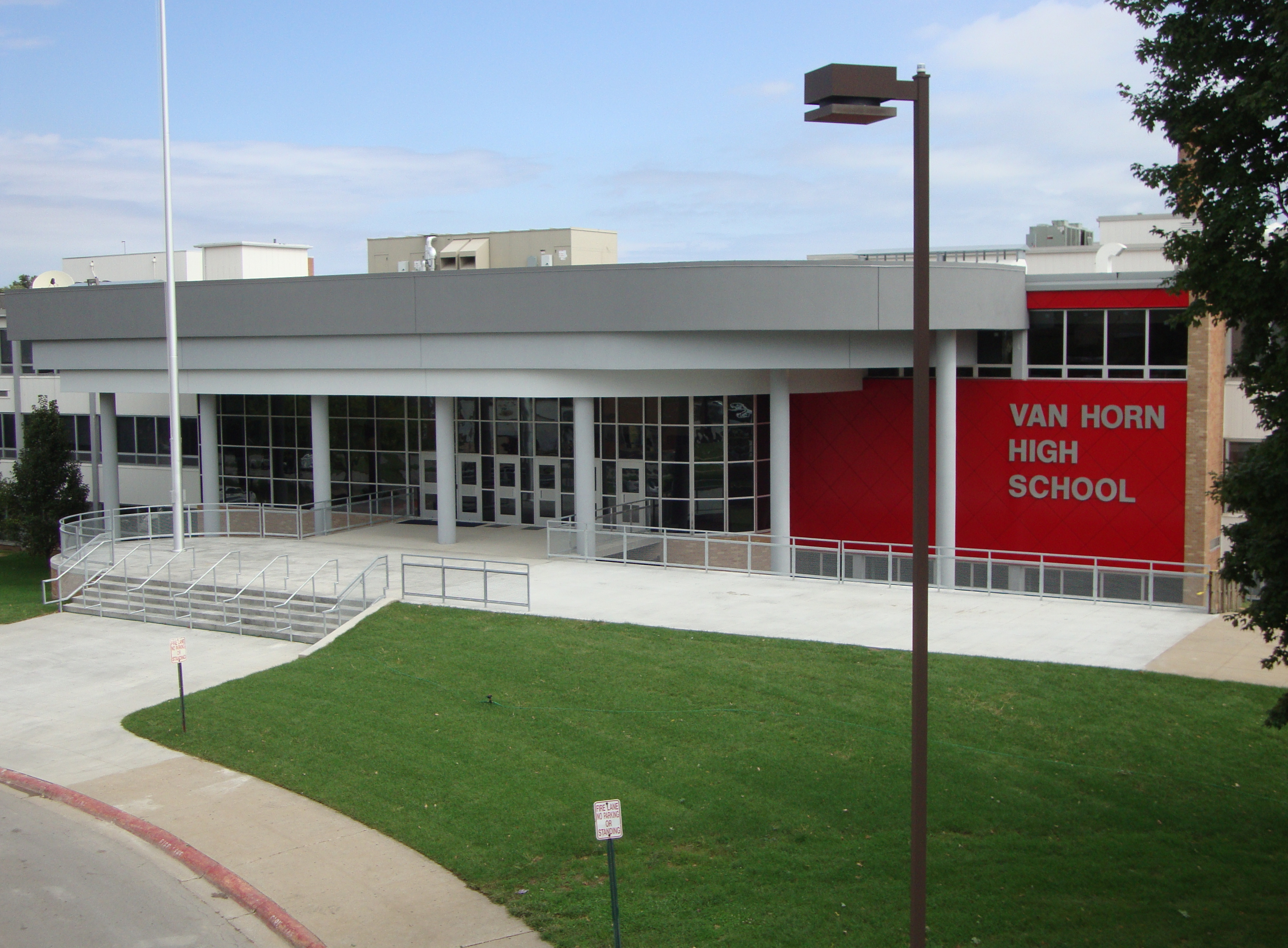
Van Horn High School

High schools

- William Chrisman High School
- Truman High School
- Van Horn High School

Alternative schools

- Independence Academy

Middle schools

- Pioneer Ridge Middle School
- George Caleb Bingham Middle School
- James Bridger Middle School
- Clifford H. Nowlin Middle School

Elementary schools

- Abraham Mallinson
- Thomas Hart Benton
- Blackburn
- Bryant
- Cassell Park
- Fairmount
- Glendale
- Korte (originally North Rock Creek)
- Little Blue
- John W. Luff
- Mill Creek
- Christian Ott
- Alexander Procter
- Randall
- Santa Fe Trail
- Spring Branch
- Sugar Creek
- Sycamore Hills
- Three Trails
- William Southern

Early education

- Hanthorn
- Sunshine Center

== Annexation boundary line debate ==
In November 2007, the voters of Independence and Kansas City voted for seven schools (one high school, one middle school, and five elementary schools) to be taken over by the Independence Public School District. Jim Hinson, the superintendent of the Independence district, believed that the KCMO district fought the annexation was because it was a "pride issue" and because the KCMO district feared that other parts of the district could secede.

The transfer did not include the C. R. Anderson School, which was originally called the Pitcher School. KCMSD annexed the school in 1957, and it became an alternative school for troubled students in the 1980s. It closed in 2000.

Transfer to Independence School District

- Van Horn High School (Independence)
- Nowlin Middle School (Independence)
- Fairmount Elementary (Independence)
- Mount Washington Elementary (Independence) (no longer part of the district, was sold)
- North Rock Creek / Korte Elementary (Independence)
- Sugar Creek Elementary (Sugar Creek)
- Three Trails Elementary (Independence)
