= List of populated places along the Missouri River =

This is a list of populated places along the Missouri River in the United States.

== Alphabetically ==
- Arrow Rock, Missouri
- Augusta, Missouri
- Atchison, Kansas
- Bellevue, Nebraska
- Bismarck, North Dakota
- Black Eagle, Montana
- Boonville, Missouri
- Bridgeton, Missouri
- Brockton, Montana
- Brownville, Nebraska
- Cannon Ball, North Dakota
- Carter Lake, Iowa
- Cascade, Montana
- Chamberlain, South Dakota
- Chamois, Missouri
- Chesterfield, Missouri
- Council Bluffs, Iowa
- Culbertson, Montana
- Dakota City, Nebraska
- Decatur, Nebraska
- Elwood, Kansas
- Florissant, Missouri
- Fort Benton, Montana
- Fort Peck, Montana
- Fort Pierre, South Dakota
- Fort Thompson, South Dakota
- Fort Yates, North Dakota
- Frazer, Montana
- Gasconade, Missouri
- Glasgow, Missouri
- Great Falls, Montana
- Hazelwood, Missouri
- Hermann, Missouri
- Huntsdale, Missouri
- Independence, Missouri
- Jefferson City, Missouri
- Kansas City, Kansas
- Kansas City, Missouri
- Lansing, Kansas
- Leavenworth, Kansas
- Lexington, Missouri
- Loma, Montana
- Lower Brule, South Dakota
- Lupus, Missouri
- Mandan, North Dakota
- Maryland Heights, Missouri
- Miami, Missouri
- Missouri City, Missouri
- Mobridge, South Dakota
- Mokane, Missouri
- Napoleon, Missouri
- Nebraska City, Nebraska
- New Haven, Missouri
- Niobrara, Nebraska
- North Kansas City, Missouri
- Oacoma, South Dakota
- Old Jamestown, Missouri
- Omaha, Nebraska
- Parkville, Missouri
- Pick City, North Dakota
- Pickstown, South Dakota
- Pierre, South Dakota
- Plattsmouth, Nebraska
- Poplar, Montana
- Portland, Missouri
- Randolph, Missouri
- Riverdale, North Dakota
- Riverside, Missouri
- River Bend, Missouri
- River Sioux, Iowa
- Rocheport, Missouri
- Rulo, Nebraska
- St. Albans, Missouri
- St. Charles, Missouri
- St. Joseph, Missouri
- Santee, Nebraska
- Sibley, Missouri
- Sioux City, Iowa
- South Sioux City, Nebraska
- Springfield, South Dakota
- Stanton, North Dakota
- Sugar Creek, Missouri
- Toston, Montana
- Townsend, Montana
- Ulm, Montana
- Washburn, North Dakota
- Washington, Missouri
- Waverly, Missouri
- Weldon Spring, Missouri
- Wellington, Missouri
- Weston, Missouri
- West Alton, Missouri
- White Cloud, Kansas
- Wildwood, Missouri
- Williston, North Dakota
- Wolf Point, Montana
- Yankton, South Dakota

== Alphabetically by state ==
=== Iowa ===
- Carter Lake
- Council Bluffs
- River Sioux
- Sioux City

=== Kansas ===
- Atchison
- Elwood
- Kansas City
- Lansing
- Leavenworth
- White Cloud

=== Missouri ===
- Arrow Rock
- Augusta
- Boonville
- Bridgeton
- Chamois
- Chesterfield
- Florissant
- Gasconade
- Glasgow
- Hazelwood
- Hermann
- Huntsdale
- Independence
- Jefferson City
- Kansas City
- Lexington
- Lupus
- Maryland Heights
- Miami
- Missouri City
- Mokane
- Napoleon
- New Haven
- North Kansas City
- Old Jamestown
- Parkville
- Portland
- Randolph
- Riverside
- River Bend
- Rocheport
- St. Albans
- St. Charles
- St. Joseph
- Sibley
- Sugar Creek
- Washington
- Waverly
- Weldon Spring
- Wellington
- Weston
- West Alton
- Wildwood

=== Montana ===
- Black Eagle
- Brockton
- Cascade
- Culbertson
- Fort Benton
- Fort Peck
- Frazer
- Great Falls
- Loma
- Poplar
- Toston
- Townsend
- Ulm
- Wolf Point

=== Nebraska ===
- Bellevue
- Blair
- Brownville
- Dakota City
- Decatur
- Nebraska City
- Niobrara
- Omaha
- Plattsmouth
- Rulo
- Santee
- South Sioux City

=== North Dakota ===
- Bismarck
- Cannon Ball
- Fort Yates
- Mandan
- Pick City
- Riverdale
- Stanton
- Washburn
- Williston

=== South Dakota ===
- Chamberlain
- Fort Pierre
- Fort Thompson
- Lower Brule
- Mobridge
- Oacoma
- Pickstown
- Pierre
- Springfield
- Yankton

== Downstream, Montana to Missouri ==
- Toston, Montana
- Townsend, Montana
- Cascade, Montana
- Ulm, Montana
- Great Falls, Montana
- Black Eagle, Montana
- Fort Benton, Montana
- Loma, Montana
- Fort Peck, Montana
- Frazer, Montana
- Wolf Point, Montana
- Poplar, Montana
- Brockton, Montana
- Culbertson, Montana
- Williston, North Dakota
- Pick City, North Dakota
- Riverdale, North Dakota
- Stanton, North Dakota
- Washburn, North Dakota
- Mandan, North Dakota
- Bismarck, North Dakota
- Cannon Ball, North Dakota
- Fort Yates, North Dakota
- Mobridge, South Dakota
- Pierre, South Dakota
- Fort Pierre, South Dakota
- Lower Brule, South Dakota
- Fort Thompson, South Dakota
- Chamberlain, South Dakota
- Oacoma, South Dakota
- Pickstown, South Dakota
- Niobrara, Nebraska
- Springfield, South Dakota
- Santee, Nebraska
- Yankton, South Dakota
- Sioux City, Iowa
- South Sioux City, Nebraska
- Dakota City, Nebraska
- Decatur, Nebraska
- River Sioux, Iowa
- Blair, Nebraska
- Omaha, Nebraska
- Council Bluffs, Iowa
- Carter Lake, Iowa
- Bellevue, Nebraska
- Plattsmouth, Nebraska
- Nebraska City, Nebraska
- Brownville, Nebraska
- Rulo, Nebraska
- White Cloud, Kansas
- St. Joseph, Missouri
- Elwood, Kansas
- Atchison, Kansas
- Weston, Missouri
- Leavenworth, Kansas
- Lansing, Kansas
- Kansas City, Kansas
- Parkville, Missouri
- Riverside, Missouri
- Kansas City, Missouri
- North Kansas City, Missouri
- Randolph, Missouri
- Independence, Missouri
- Sugar Creek, Missouri
- River Bend, Missouri
- Missouri City, Missouri
- Sibley, Missouri
- Napoleon, Missouri
- Wellington, Missouri
- Lexington, Missouri
- Waverly, Missouri
- Miami, Missouri
- Glasgow, Missouri
- Arrow Rock, Missouri
- Boonville, Missouri
- Rocheport, Missouri
- Huntsdale, Missouri
- Lupus, Missouri
- Jefferson City, Missouri
- Chamois, Missouri
- Portland, Missouri
- Gasconade, Missouri
- Hermann, Missouri
- New Haven, Missouri
- Washington, Missouri
- Augusta, Missouri
- St. Albans, Missouri
- Wildwood, Missouri
- Chesterfield, Missouri
- Weldon Spring, Missouri
- Maryland Heights, Missouri
- St. Charles, Missouri
- Bridgeton, Missouri
- Hazelwood, Missouri
- Florissant, Missouri
- Old Jamestown, Missouri
- West Alton, Missouri

== Downstream by state ==
=== Montana ===
- Toston
- Townsend
- Cascade
- Ulm
- Great Falls
- Black Eagle
- Fort Benton
- Loma
- Fort Peck
- Frazer
- Wolf Point
- Poplar
- Brockton
- Culbertson

=== North Dakota ===
- Williston
- Pick City
- Riverdale
- Stanton
- Washburn
- Mandan
- Bismarck
- Cannon Ball
- Fort Yates

=== South Dakota ===
- Mobridge
- Pierre
- Fort Pierre
- Lower Brule
- Fort Thompson
- Chamberlain
- Oacoma
- Pickstown
- Springfield
- Yankton

=== Nebraska ===
- Niobrara
- Santee
- South Sioux City
- Dakota City
- Decatur
- Blair
- Omaha
- Bellevue
- Plattsmouth
- Nebraska City
- Brownville
- Rulo

=== Iowa ===
- Sioux City
- River Sioux
- Council Bluffs
- Carter Lake

=== Kansas ===
- White Cloud
- Elwood
- Atchison
- Leavenworth
- Lansing
- Kansas City

=== Missouri ===
- St. Joseph
- Weston
- Parkville
- Riverside
- Kansas City
- North Kansas City
- Randolph
- Independence
- Sugar Creek
- River Bend
- Missouri City
- Sibley
- Napoleon
- Wellington
- Lexington
- Waverly
- Miami
- Glasgow
- Arrow Rock
- Boonville
- Rocheport
- Huntsdale
- Lupus
- Jefferson City
- Chamois
- Portland
- Gasconade
- Hermann
- New Haven
- Washington
- Augusta
- St. Albans
- Wildwood
- Chesterfield
- Weldon Spring
- Maryland Heights
- St. Charles
- Bridgeton
- Hazelwood
- Florissant
- Old Jamestown
- West Alton
