= Gasconade =

Gasconade may refer to:

- Gasconade County, Missouri
- Gasconade, Missouri, a town in Missouri
- Gasconade River, a river in the Ozarks
