= Buckner, Missouri =

- City
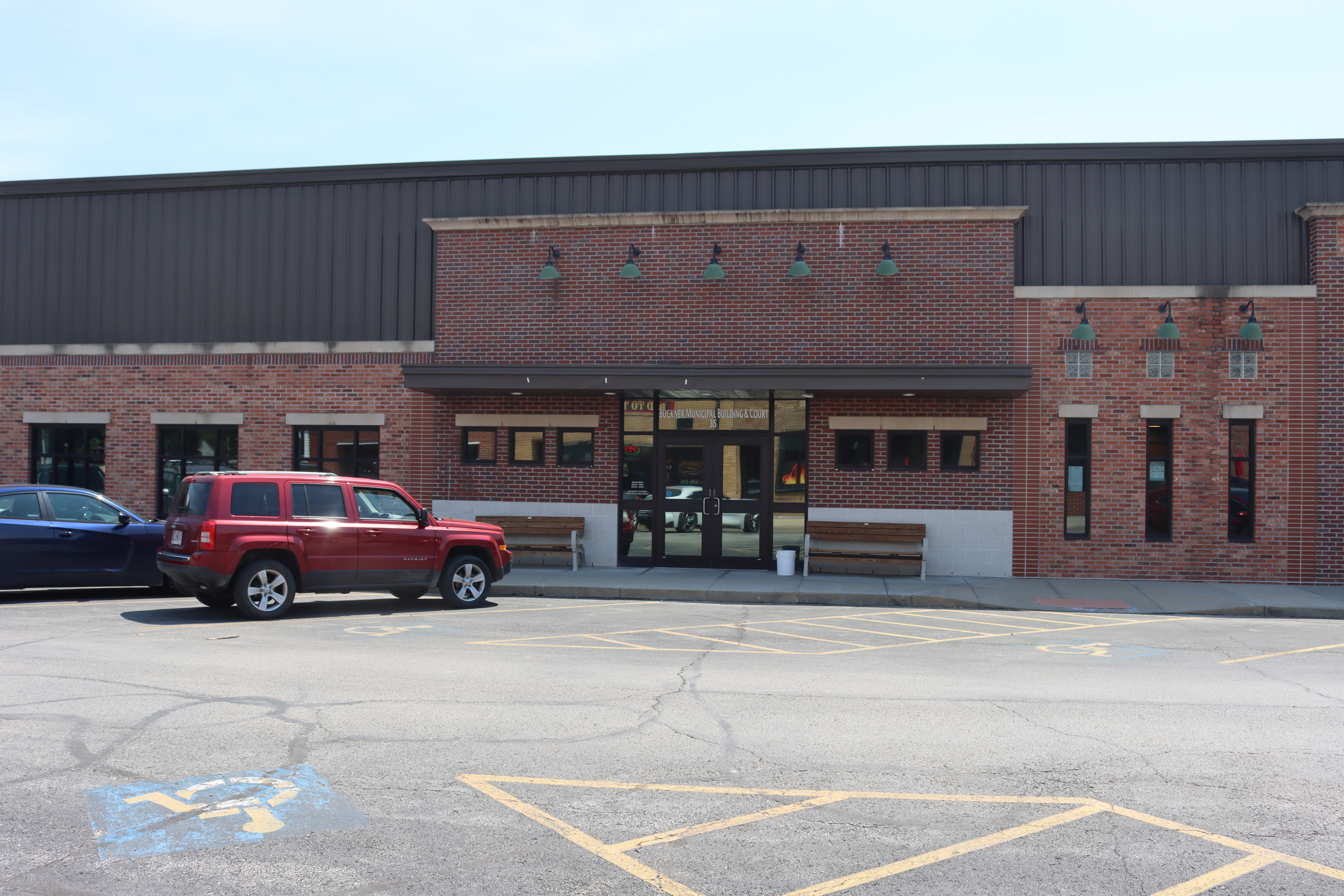
- City Hall
- Nickname: "The Little Village in the Valley"
- Location of Buckner, Missouri
- Coordinates: 39°8′5″N 94°11′54″W
- Country: United States
- State: Missouri
- County: Jackson
- Incorporated: 1930

Area
  - Total: 1.79 sq mi (4.63 km^{2})
  - Land: 1.78 sq mi (4.62 km^{2})
  - Water: 0.0039 sq mi (0.01 km^{2})
- Elevation: 751 ft (229 m)

Population (2020)
  - Total: 2,945
  - Density: 1,649.3/sq mi (636.81/km^{2})
- Time zone: UTC-6 (Central (CST))
  - Summer (DST): UTC-5 (CDT)
- ZIP code: 64016
- Area code: 816
- FIPS code: 29-09424
- GNIS feature ID: 0735540
- Website: www.cityofbucknermo.gov

Buckner is a city in Jackson County, Missouri, United States. The population was 2,945 at the 2020 census. For decades it was best known for TV and radio commercials promoting local automobile dealership Lasater Ford, run by the Lasater brothers, Wilson and Milton and later Halverson Ford. It is part of the Kansas City metropolitan area.

== Geography ==
According to the United States Census Bureau, the city has a total area of 1.79 square miles (4.64 km^{2}), all land.

The city of Buckner is split into three wards and is located in northeastern Jackson County along US 24.

== Demographics ==
Historical population
Census	Pop.	Note	%±
1880	88		—
1890	164		86.4%
1900	234		42.7%
1910	410		75.2%
1920	439		7.1%
1930	529		20.5%
1940	571		7.9%
1950	639		11.9%
1960	1,198		87.5%
1970	1,695		41.5%
1980	2,848		68.0%
1990	2,873		0.9%
2000	2,725		−5.2%
2010	3,076		12.9%
2020	2,945		−4.3%
U.S. Decennial Census

=== Racial and ethnic composition ===
Buckner city, Missouri – Racial and ethnic composition Note: the US Census treats Hispanic/Latino as an ethnic category. This table excludes Latinos from the racial categories and assigns them to a separate category. Hispanics/Latinos may be of any race.
Race / Ethnicity (NH = Non-Hispanic)	Pop 2000	Pop 2010	Pop 2020	% 2000	% 2010	% 2020
White alone (NH)	2,594	2,880	2,553	95.19%	93.63%	86.69%
Black or African American alone (NH)	3	11	16	0.11%	0.36%	0.54%
Native American or Alaska Native alone (NH)	12	11	13	0.44%	0.36%	0.44%
Asian alone (NH)	0	3	4	0.00%	0.10%	0.14%
Native Hawaiian or Pacific Islander alone (NH)	6	6	0	0.22%	0.20%	0.00%
Other race alone (NH)	2	3	3	0.07%	0.10%	0.10%
Mixed race or Multiracial (NH)	54	58	241	1.98%	1.89%	8.18%
Hispanic or Latino (any race)	54	104	115	1.98%	3.38%	3.90%
Total	2,725	3,076	2,945	100.00%	100.00%	100.00%

=== 2020 census ===
As of the 2020 census, Buckner had a population of 2,945. The median age was 36.8 years. 26.5% of residents were under the age of 18 and 13.3% of residents were 65 years of age or older. For every 100 females there were 95.8 males, and for every 100 females age 18 and over there were 94.0 males age 18 and over.

0.0% of residents lived in urban areas, while 100.0% lived in rural areas.

There were 1,129 households in Buckner, of which 36.7% had children under the age of 18 living in them. Of all households, 43.0% were married-couple households, 17.9% were households with a male householder and no spouse or partner present, and 29.1% were households with a female householder and no spouse or partner present. About 27.0% of all households were made up of individuals and 11.1% had someone living alone who was 65 years of age or older.

There were 1,205 housing units, of which 6.3% were vacant. The homeowner vacancy rate was 1.8% and the rental vacancy rate was 7.3%.

Racial composition as of the 2020 census
Race	Number	Percent
White	2,597	88.2%
Black or African American	16	0.5%
American Indian and Alaska Native	15	0.5%
Asian	6	0.2%
Native Hawaiian and Other Pacific Islander	0	0.0%
Some other race	22	0.7%
Two or more races	289	9.8%

=== 2010 census ===
As of the census of 2010, there were 3,076 people, 1,141 households, and 808 families residing in the city. The population density was 1,718.4 inhabitants per square mile (663.5/km^{2}). There were 1,243 housing units at an average density of 694.4 per square mile (268.1/km^{2}). The racial makeup of the city was 95.6% White, 0.4% African American, 0.4% Native American, 0.1% Asian, 0.2% Pacific Islander, 1.2% from other races, and 2.2% from two or more races. Hispanic or Latino of any race were 3.4% of the population.

There were 1,141 households, of which 41.0% had children under the age of 18 living with them, 50.7% were married couples living together, 13.1% had a female householder with no husband present, 6.9% had a male householder with no wife present, and 29.2% were non-families. 24.2% of all households were made up of individuals, and 10.2% had someone living alone who was 65 years of age or older. The average household size was 2.70 and the average family size was 3.19.

The median age in the city was 33.6 years. 29.5% of residents were under the age of 18; 8% were between the ages of 18 and 24; 28.1% were from 25 to 44; 24.1% were from 45 to 64; and 10.4% were 65 years of age or older. The gender makeup of the city was 50.3% male and 49.7% female.

=== 2000 census ===
As of the census of 2000, there were 2,725 people, 1,019 households, and 747 families residing in the city. The population density was 1,595.3 inhabitants per square mile (615.9/km^{2}). There were 1,065 housing units at an average density of 623.5 per square mile (240.7/km^{2}). The racial makeup of the city was 95.93% White, 0.11% African American, 0.44% Native American, 0.26% Pacific Islander, 0.84% from other races, and 2.42% from two or more races. Hispanic or Latino of any race were 1.98% of the population.

There were 1,019 households, out of which 39.1% had children under the age of 18 living with them, 54.0% were married couples living together, 13.7% had a female householder with no husband present, and 26.6% were non-families. 22.2% of all households were made up of individuals, and 10.4% had someone living alone who was 65 years of age or older. The average household size was 2.67 and the average family size was 3.14.

In the city the population was spread out, with 30.3% under the age of 18, 9.1% from 18 to 24, 29.6% from 25 to 44, 21.0% from 45 to 64, and 10.1% who were 65 years of age or older. The median age was 33 years. For every 100 females, there were 96.9 males. For every 100 females age 18 and over, there were 91.5 males.

The median income for a household in the city was $40,577, and the median income for a family was $45,313. Males had a median income of $36,010 versus $22,372 for females. The per capita income for the city was $16,748. About 7.3% of families and 8.4% of the population were below the poverty line, including 10.4% of those under age 18 and 10.4% of those age 65 or over.

== History ==
Buckner was established in 1875. In its inception Buckner was a railroad depot town for the newly built Wyandotte, Kansas City and Northwestern Railroad. In 1879, the line was purchased by the Missouri Pacific Railroad. Where Buckner derives its name from is a point of contention. It was likely named for Walker Buckner, who was a board member of the WKCNW Railroad that founded the town. Others suggest it was named after former US Senator Alexander Buckner (1830-1833) who served on the States Constitutional Convention in 1820, or named after Real Estate operator Simon Buckner. Yet another claim as namesake is Thomas W. Buckner, an original owner of the site.

The WGN America series Outlaw Country was set in Buckner.

== Education ==
Buckner is part of the Fort Osage R-1 School District. The only school within the city limits is Buckner Elementary, for middle school children attend Fire Prairie Middle School, and move onto Fort Osage High School to complete their secondary education.

Metropolitan Community College has the Fort Osage school district in its taxation area.

Buckner has a public library, a branch of the Mid-Continent Public Library.

== Media ==
=== Newspapers ===
The Gazette Weekly serves Buckner, Levasy, Sibley, and Eastern Independence on a weekly basis.
