= Bruce Van Dyke =

American football player (born 1944)

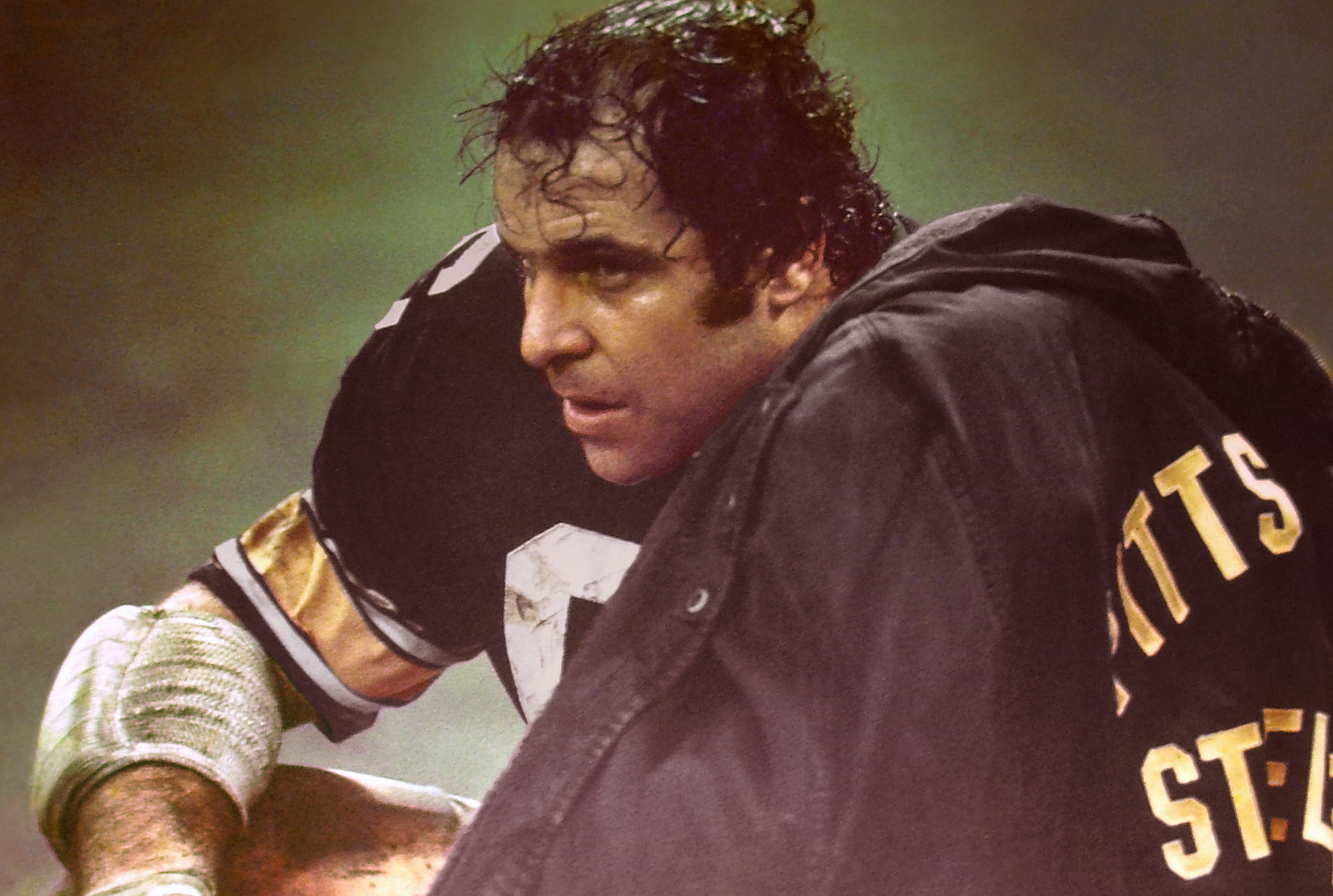
- Van Dyke with the Pittsburgh Steelers in 1973

No. 66, 61
- Position: Guard

Personal information
- Born: August 6, 1944 (age 82); Lancaster, California, U.S.
- Listed height: 6 ft 2 in (1.88 m)
- Listed weight: 255 lb (116 kg)

Career information
- High school: Fort Osage (Independence, Missouri)
- College: Missouri (1962-1965)
- NFL draft: 1966: 12th round, 174th overall pick
- AFL draft: 1966: 15th round, 133rd overall pick

Career history
- Philadelphia Eagles (1966); Pittsburgh Steelers (1967–1973); Green Bay Packers (1974–1976)

Awards and highlights
- 2× Second-team All-Pro (1972, 1973); Pro Bowl (1973); Pittsburgh Steelers Legends team; First-team All-Big Eight (1965); Missouri Sports Hall of Fame (2010); 1966 Sugar Bowl; Hula Bowl

Career NFL statistics
- Games played: 128
- Games started: 121
- Fumble recoveries: 9
- Stats at Pro Football Reference

Bruce Van Dyke (born August 6, 1944) is an American former professional football player who was a guard for eleven seasons in the National Football League (NFL) for the Philadelphia Eagles, Pittsburgh Steelers, and the Green Bay Packers. He played college football for the Missouri Tigers.

== Early life ==
Van Dyke grew up in Buckner, Missouri, and attended Fort Osage High School in Independence, Missouri. He played college football at the University of Missouri, where he was a two way starter, playing on both the offensive and defensive lines under head coach Dan Devine. As a first-team All-Big Eight Conference defensive tackle in 1965, Van Dyke played on Tigers teams that went a combined 21–8–2 from 1963 to 1965. The 1965 Missouri squad, on which he served as a captain, finished the year ranked sixth nationally, with a win over the Florida in the 1966 Sugar Bowl. Van Dyke was selected to play in the Hula Bowl in 1966, and was inducted into the University of Missouri's Intercollegiate Hall of Fame in 2001.

== Professional career ==
Van Dyke was selected in the 12th round of the 1966 NFL draft by the Philadelphia Eagles and in the 15th round of the 1966 AFL draft by the Kansas City Chiefs. He signed with the Eagles and played there his rookie year. The following season he was traded to the Pittsburgh Steelers where he played right guard for the next seven seasons. His first year with the Steelers the team had won only one game. In 1972 Pittsburgh finished the season with an 11–3 record and won the AFC Central title. In week 8 of the 1972 Steelers season Van Dyke was named A.P. Offensive player of the week after a 40–17 win over the Cincinnati Bengals. That same year the Steelers made their first playoff appearance since the 1947 season and won their first franchise playoff game beating the Oakland Raiders 13–7. During that game, one of the most memorable plays in both Van Dyke's career and NFL history occurred. Trailing 7–6 with 22 seconds left in the game, Franco Harris scored the winning touchdown on the final play of the game. This play, of course, is known as the Immaculate Reception. In 1974, Van Dyke was traded to the Green Bay Packers, where he was reunited with his former college coach Dan Devine. While in Green Bay, he switched to left guard and retired from football after the 1976 season. In 2008, Van Dyke was named to the Pittsburgh Steelers Legends team.
