= Sugar Creek Slavic Festival =

The Sugar Creek Slavic Festival is an annual two-day event held in Sugar Creek, Missouri celebrating Kansas City's rich Slavic heritage. The next Festival is Friday & Saturday, June 7th and 8th 2024.

The Sugar Creek Fair and Festival Board sponsors the Slavic Festival. The board consists of area civic and service organization members. In 2005, the Ambassador to the United States of the Slovak Republic, Mr. Ratislav Kačer, made an appearance at the festival to celebrate the event's 20th anniversary. Through their cooperative efforts, the Slavic Festival has continued to grow and help maintain the ethnic traditions of the people of Sugar Creek.

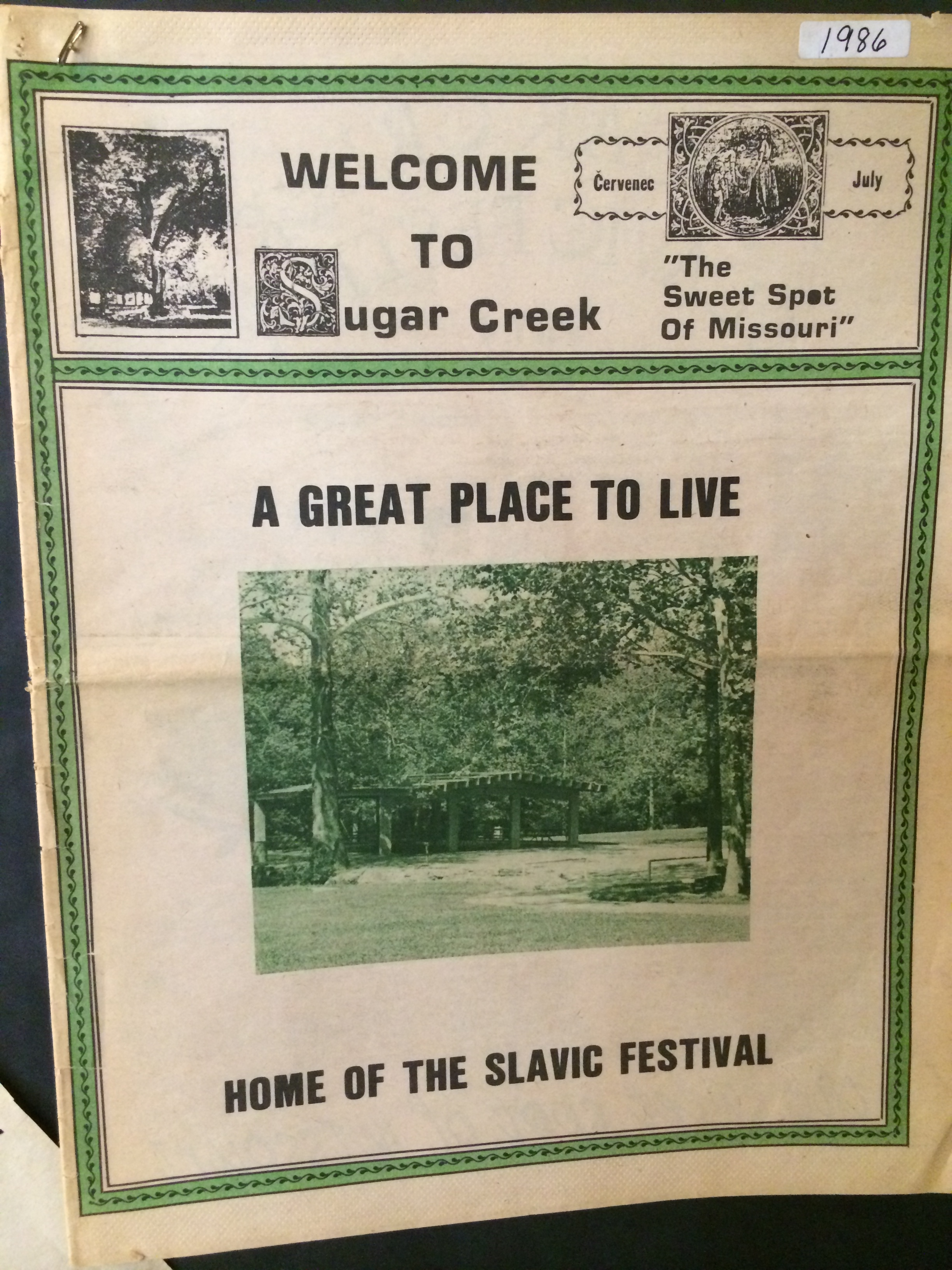
1986 Slavic Festival Ad

Traditions of Slavic culture brought by immigrants from Czechoslovakia, Croatia, and Poland had been present even in Sugar Creek's earliest days. Celebrations were carried out in a customary manner between the residents of the town throughout the late 19th and most of the 20th century. However, it was not until July 4, 1986, that the celebrations became a formal event. The Fair and Festival Board patterned the festival after the very successful Folk Festivals sponsored by St. Cyril's Catholic Church and its Altar and Rosary Society in the late 1970s.

== Slavic Heritage ==
The early Slavs came from Indo-European lands, spreading from various parts of Asia into Eastern Europe about 2000 BC. Under the pressure of nomadic hordes, the Slavic tribes crossed the Carpathian Mountains and pushed their way down to the Balkans. Others moved westward toward the upper Danube, and still others eastward toward the River Dniper and Black Sea. This migration continued from the fourth through the eighth century, giving birth to the Slavic nations that we know today.

For many centuries the Slavic tribes used the same common language. Starting with the migration into Eastern Europe some dialectical differences began to develop among the various tribes. Generally, linguists divide the Slavs into three main groups - Western Slavs, Southern or Yugoslavs, and Eastern Slavs. The Western Slavs embrace modern nations of Czechs, Slovaks, Lusitian Serbs and Poles. Southern Slavs include Serbs, Croats, Slovenians, Macedonians and Bulgarians. The Eastern Slavs are subdivided into three separate branches: Russians (or Muscovites), White (or Bielo-Russians) and Rusyns (or Ukrainian).

In the late 19th and early 20th centuries political and economic tension triggered a wave of emigration from the Slavic nations to America. These hard working people came to form settlements in cities and neighborhoods, like Sugar Creek, where jobs and the American Dream welcomed their arrival. Today, millions of Americans trace their family heritage to the Slavic nations. Celebrations, like the Sugar Creek Slavic Festival, remind us of those roots and the sacrifices made by those who came before us seeking a better life.

== Activities ==
The Festival is a living display of the various Slavic customs and events continued by the people of Sugar Creek. Groups and companies from across the Kansas City area serve traditional Slavic food, including Sarma (cabbage roll) meals with Croatian potato salad and slaw, Kielbasa (Polish sausage), Goulash (Slovak stew), Haluski, Peirogi and moe For those with a sweet tooth, authentic Slavic desserts such as Povitica, (walnut bread) Apple Strudel, Kolache, (fruit pastry) Kielflies, Bourekes, Medovik, savory Bierocks and other items.

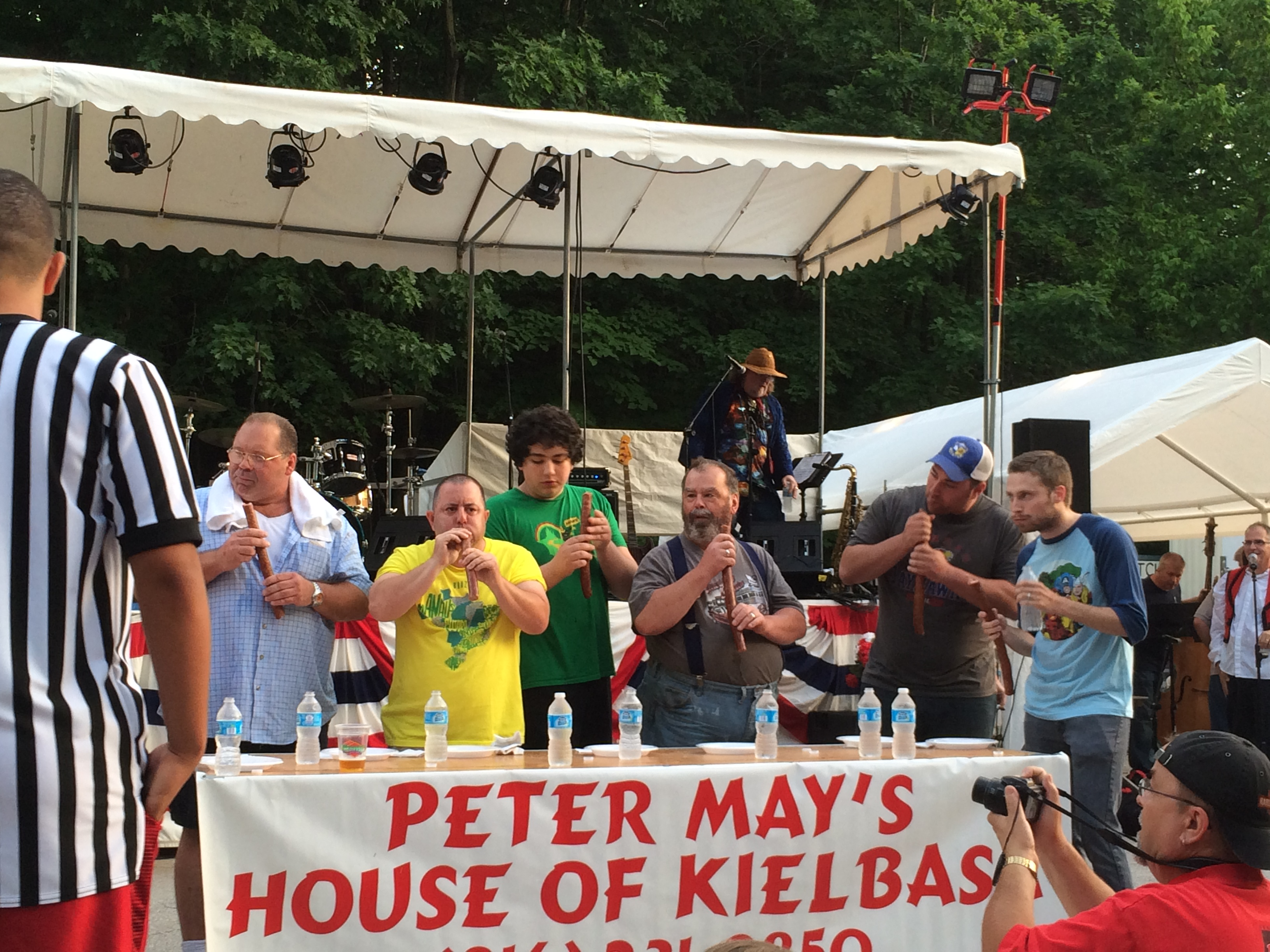
Photo of Kielbasa eating contest

Food isn't the only thing the festival offers, however. Music and dancing are, of course, mainstays as well. Tamburitzan musicians play on authentic instruments, and groups perform traditional songs and dances in kroj representative of Slavic countries. The Festival has featured such Grammy nominees as LynnMarie & The Nashville Polka Guys, Brave Combo and Alex Meixner. Each year, the festival holds North America's largest Kolo (circle) dances.

For those who live for competition, the festival holds an annual Kielbasa eating contest to see who will be crowned that year's Kielbasa King or Queen. It is also home to the Miss Czech-Slovak Missouri Pageant for young women to proudly represent their heritage while competing for a chance to represent the state at the annual Miss Czech-Slovak US Pageant in Wilber, Nebraska.

Folk are and fashion are also on display at the festival Visitors are able to see and take home a piece of Slavic history and culture. From the museum display of artifacts to hand-painted Ukrainian eggs, Baltic amber, imported crystal, Polish pottery, hand embroidered Ukrainian fashion and much more.

== Location ==
The Slavic Festival is held on the Mike Onka Memorial Building grounds, 11520 E. Putnam in Sugar Creek. Free parking and shuttles are available throughout the event. Visit the Festival website for more information.

== 2024 Festival ==
The Sugar Creek Slavic Festival will be held June 7 and 8 in Sugar Creek, Missouri. Scheduled entertainment include five-time Grammy nominee Lynn Marie and the Nashville Polka Guys, the Sugar Creek Kolo Kids and Ethnic Dance Troupe, Hvratski Obicaj, the Sugar Creek Tamburitzans, village musicians, Baric Brothers, We Like Pivo, Dandelion Lakewood, PromoUkraine, Irina Moma, Megan Luttrell, DJ Kolache and the annual sausage eating competition sponsored by Peter May's House of Kielbasa.

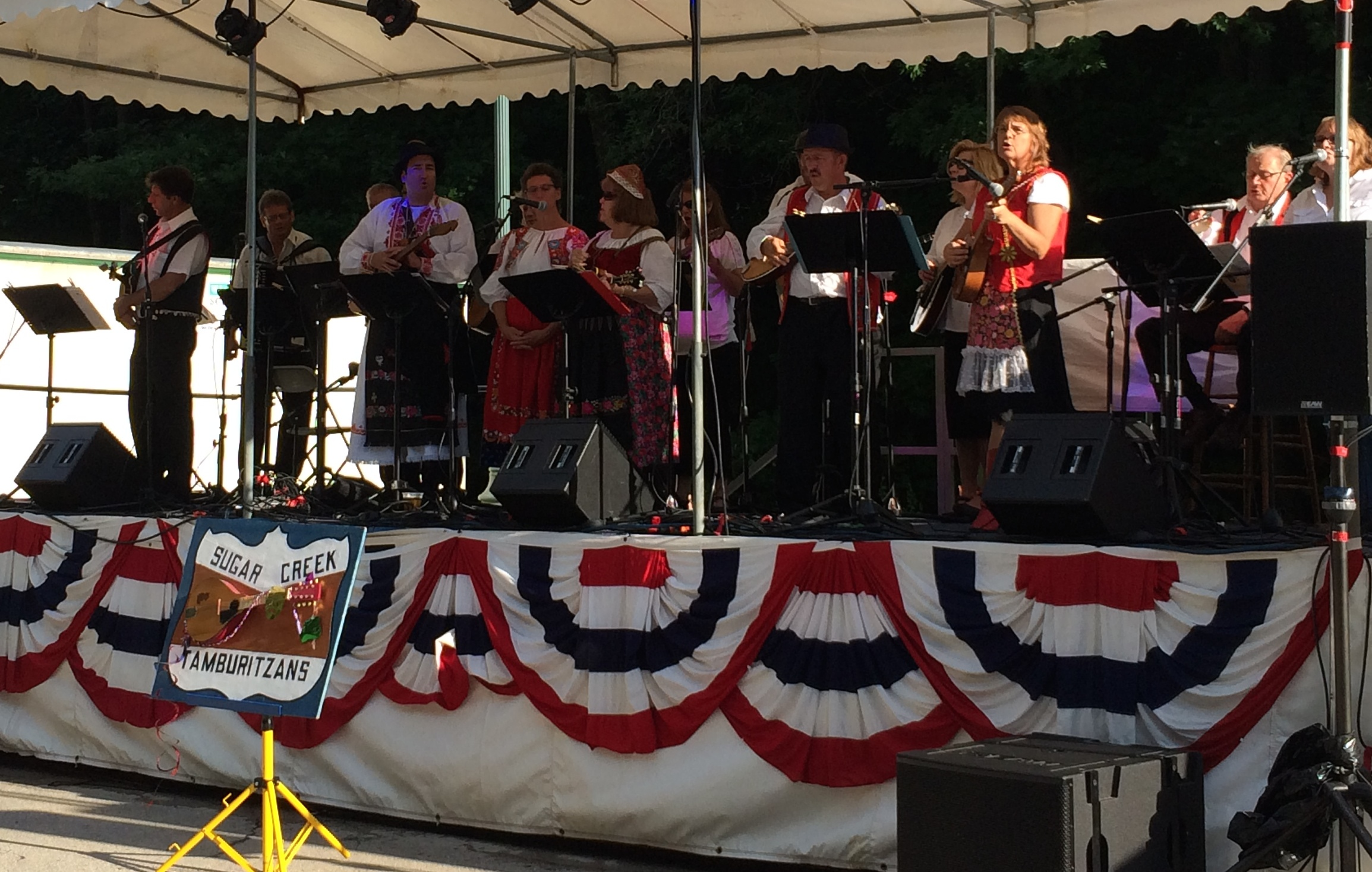
Sugar Creek Tamburitzans

== 2016 Festival ==
The Sugar Creek Slavic Festival was held June 10 and 11 in Sugar Creek, Missouri. Scheduled entertainment included Grammy Award nominee Alex Meixner, the Sugar Creek Kolo Kids, the Hrvatski Obicaj Ethnic Dance Troupe Tamburitzans and village musicians. It also included the annual sausage eating competition sponsored by Peter May's House of Kielbasa.

== 2015 Festival ==
The Sugar Creek Slavic Festival was held June 5 and 6 in Sugar Creek, Missouri. Scheduled entertainment included Grammy Award nominee Alex Meixner, the Sugar Creek Kolo Kids, Ethnic Dance Troupe Tamburitzans and village musicians. It also included the annual sausage eating competition sponsored by Peter May's House of Kielbasa.

== 2014 Festival ==
The Sugar Creek Slavic Festival was held June 6 and 7 in Sugar Creek, Missouri. Scheduled entertainment included music royalty and two-time Grammy Award winner Brave Combo, as well as a sausage eating competition sponsored by Peter May's House of Kielbasa.

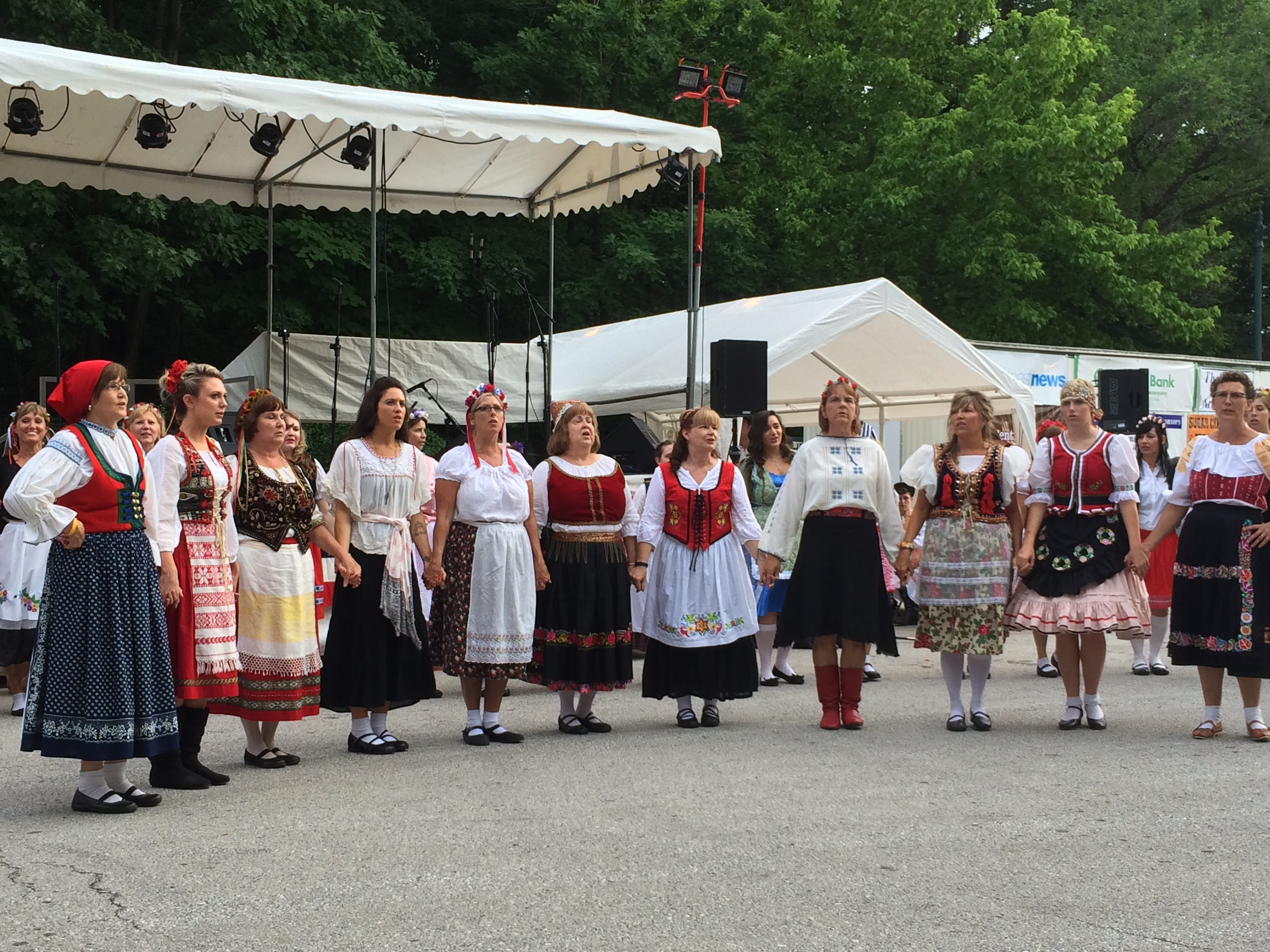
Photo of women participating in Polka dance

== 2013 Festival ==
The Sugar Creek Slavic Festival was held June 7 and 8 in Sugar Creek, Missouri. Scheduled entertainment included Grammy Award nominee Alex Meixner, The Ed Grisnik Orchestra, Sugar Creek Tamburitzans, Hrvatski Običaj, Kolo Kids and the Sugar Creek Ethnic Dance Troupe.

== 2012 Festival ==
The Sugar Creek Slavic Festival was held June 8 and 9 in Sugar Creek, Missouri. Scheduled entertainment included Grammy Award nominee Alex Meixner, The Ed Grisnik Orchestra, Sugar Creek Tamburitzans, Hrvatski Običaj, Kolo Kids and the Sugar Creek Ethnic Dance Troupe.

== 2011 Festival ==
The Sugar Creek Slavic Festival was held June 10 and 11 in Sugar Creek, Missouri. Scheduled entertainment included Grammy Award nominee Alex Meixner, The Ed Grisnik Orchestra, Sugar Creek Tamburitzans, Hrvatski Običaj, Kolo Kids and the Sugar Creek Ethnic Dance Troupe.

== 2010 Festival ==
The Sugar Creek Slavic Festival was held June 11 and 12 in Sugar Creek, Missouri. Scheduled entertainment included Grammy-winning artist, Brave Combo, The Ed Grisnik Orchestra, Sugar Creek Tamburitzans, Hrvatski Običaj, The Strawberry Hill Croatian Folk Ensemble, Kolo Kids and the Sugar Creek Ethnic Dance Troupe.

== 2009 Festival ==
The Sugar Creek Slavic Festival was held June 12 and 13 in Sugar Creek, Missouri. Scheduled entertainment included Grammy-winning artist, Brave Combo, The Ed Grisnik Orchestra, Sugar Creek Tamburitzans, The Strawberry Hill Croatian Folk Ensemble, Kolo Kids and the Sugar Creek Ethnic Dance Troupe.

== 2008 Festival ==
Sugar Creek Slavic Festival was held June 6 and 7 in Sugar Creek, Missouri. Scheduled entertainment included Grammy-nominated group LynnMarie & the Boxhounds, Polka Hall of Fame member Don Lipovac, Ed Grisnik Orchestra, Sugar Creek Tamburitzans, Strawberry Hill Croatian Folk Ensemble, Kolo Kids and the Sugar Creek Ethnic Dance Troupe.

== 2007 Festival ==
The 2007 Sugar Creek Slavic Festival was held June 8 and 9 in Sugar Creek, Missouri. Scheduled entertainment included Grammy Award Winner Brave Combo, Polka Hall of Fame member Don Lipovac, Ed Grisnik Orchestra, Sugar Creek Tamburitzans, Kolo Kids and the Sugar Creek Ethnic Dance Troupe.
