= American Crow Creek =

Stream in South Dakota, USA

American Crow Creek Tributary to Missouri River
- Location of American Crow Creek mouth American Crow Creek (the United States)

Location
- Country: United States
- State: South Dakota
- County: Lyman
- Town: Oacoma

Physical characteristics
- Source: Counselor Creek divide
  - location: about 0.5 miles east of Medicine Butte
  - coordinates: 43°57′56.97″N 099°36′4.39″W
  - elevation: 2,100 ft (640 m)
- Mouth: Missouri River
  - location: Oacoma, South Dakota
  - coordinates: 43°46′56.98″N 099°24′24.77″W
  - elevation: 1,355 ft (413 m)
- Length: 26.64 mi (42.87 km)
- Basin size: 112.17 square miles (290.5 km^{2})
- Discharge
  - location: Missouri River
  - average: 10.29 cu ft/s (0.291 m^{3}/s) at mouth with Missouri River

Basin features
- Progression: Missouri River → Mississippi River → Gulf of Mexico
- River system: Missouri River
- Tributaries
  - left: North Fork American Crow Creek
  - right: Big Creek
- Bridges: SD 47, 238th Street, 329th Avenue (x2), 241st Street, 242nd Street, 243rd Street, Service Road, I-90

American Crow Creek is a stream in the U.S. state of South Dakota.

According to tradition, American Crow Creek received its name directly from Lewis and Clark.

== See also ==
- List of rivers of South Dakota
