= Fort Osage R-1 School District =

School district in Missouri, U.S.

Coordinates: 39°08′20″N 94°17′27″W

Location
- Independence, Missouri United States

District information
- Grades: PreK–12
- Schools: 12

Students and staff
- Students: 4,880
- Teachers: 372.0 (on FTE basis)
- Student–teacher ratio: 13.1:1

Other information
- Website: www.fortosage.net

The Fort Osage R-1 School District is a public school district located in Jackson County, Missouri, in the Kansas City metropolitan area. The district headquarters is in an unincorporated area adjacent to the City of Independence. The district serves a section of northern Independence, a section of Sugar Creek, and the municipalities of Buckner, Levasy, River Bend, and Sibley.

The district includes the Woodland Early Childhood Center, Cler-Mont Elementary, Elm Grove Elementary, Blue Hills Elementary, Indian Trails Elementary, Buckner Elementary, Fire Prairie Upper Elementary, Osage Trail Middle School, Fort Osage High School, Career & Technology Center, and Lewis and Clark Academy.
