= Fort Osage High School =

Public school in Missouri, United States

Location
- 2101 N Twyman Rd; Independence, MO; 64058; 39.1384°N 94.2914°W

Information
- Type: Public School
- School district: Fort Osage R-1 School District
- Principal: John Luke
- Staff: 86.51 (on an FTE basis)
- Grades: 9-12
- Enrollment: 1,575 (2023–2024)
- Student to teacher ratio: 18.21
- Colors: Red and white
- Mascot: Indian
- Nickname: Indians
- Rivals: William Chrisman High School, Truman High School
- Information: Phone: 816-650-7063; Fax: 816-650-7088
- Athletic Director: Zach Dudley
- Website: Fort Osage High School

Fort Osage High School is a high school located at 2101 N. Twyman Rd. in unincorporated Jackson County, Missouri, in the Kansas City metropolitan area, adjacent to Independence. It belongs to the Fort Osage R-1 School District and serves a section of northern Independence, a section of Sugar Creek, and the municipalities of Buckner, Levasy, River Bend, and Sibley.

It currently serves approximately 1,500 students from grades 9-12. It is named after the Fort Osage National Historic Landmark along the Missouri River in nearby Sibley, Missouri.

== Athletics ==
Fort Osage's baseball team has appeared in three 4A state championships having won in 1991 and 1997, and finishing as runners up in 1996.

Since 2009, Fort Osage's football team has appeared in the Class 5 state championship game 5 times in 2009, 2012, 2015, 2018, and 2022. They won the state championship game in 2015.

=== Fall athletics ===
- Football
- Cross Country
- Golf (Girls)
- Soccer (Boys)
- Softball
- Tennis (Girls)
- Volleyball(girls)

=== Winter athletics ===
- Basketball (Boys)
- Basketball (Girls)
- Wrestling

=== Spring athletics ===
- Baseball
- Golf (Boys)
- Soccer (Girls)
- Tennis (Boys)
- Track & Field
- volleyball(boys)

=== Spirit squads ===
- Cheerleading
- Indianettes (dance team)

== Notable alumni ==
- Albert Pujols, former MLB player, most notably for the St. Louis Cardinals
- Betty Lennox, WNBA player for the Los Angeles Sparks
- Chris Metzler, documentary filmmaker
- Chad Troutwine, co-founder of Veritas Prep, movie producer
- E. J. Gaines, former NFL player
- Bruce Van Dyke, NFL drafted by Philadelphia Eagles, 1966, also played for the Pittsburgh Steelers, 1967-1973, and the Green Bay Packers, 1974-1976
- Skylar Thompson, quarterback for the Pittsburgh Steelers
