= River Bend, Missouri =

- Village
- Location of River Bend, Missouri
- Coordinates: 39°10′44″N 94°23′42″W
- Country: United States
- State: Missouri
- County: Jackson

Government
  - Mayor: Alex Dockler

Area
  - Total: 1.75 sq mi (4.52 km^{2})
  - Land: 1.52 sq mi (3.94 km^{2})
  - Water: 0.22 sq mi (0.58 km^{2})
- Elevation: 735 ft (224 m)

Population (2020)
  - Total: 3
  - Density: 2.0/sq mi (0.76/km^{2})
- Time zone: UTC-6 (Central (CST))
  - Summer (DST): UTC-5 (CDT)
- FIPS code: 29-62056
- GNIS feature ID: 1699794
- Website: villageofriverbendmo.gov

River Bend is a village in Jackson County, Missouri, United States. The population was 3 at the 2020 census. It is the only part of Jackson County that lies north of the Missouri River. In 1951, the Missouri River was relocated to a new channel, creating River Bend, (also known as Liberty Bend). The county line still follows the original riverbed. It is part of the Kansas City metropolitan area. The mayor is Alex Dockler.

== Geography ==
According to the United States Census Bureau, the village has a total area of 1.75 square miles (4.53 km^{2}), of which 1.52 square miles (3.94 km^{2}) is land and 0.23 square miles (0.60 km^{2}) is water.

== Demographics ==
Historical population
Census	Pop.	Note	%±
2000	10		—
2010	10		0.0%
2020	3		−70.0%
U.S. Decennial Census

=== Racial and ethnic composition ===
River Bend village, Missouri – Racial and ethnic composition Note: the US Census treats Hispanic/Latino as an ethnic category. This table excludes Latinos from the racial categories and assigns them to a separate category. Hispanics/Latinos may be of any race.
Race / Ethnicity (NH = Non-Hispanic)	Pop 2000	Pop 2010	Pop 2020	% 2000	% 2010	% 2020
White alone (NH)	10	10	3	100.00%	100.00%	100.00%
Black or African American alone (NH)	0	0	0	0.00%	0.00%	0.00%
Native American or Alaska Native alone (NH)	0	0	0	0.00%	0.00%	0.00%
Asian alone (NH)	0	0	0	0.00%	0.00%	0.00%
Native Hawaiian or Pacific Islander alone (NH)	0	0	0	0.00%	0.00%	0.00%
Other race alone (NH)	0	0	0	0.00%	0.00%	0.00%
Mixed race or Multiracial (NH)	0	0	0	0.00%	0.00%	0.00%
Hispanic or Latino (any race)	0	0	0	0.00%	0.00%	0.00%
Total	10	10	3	100.00%	100.00%	100.00%

=== 2010 census ===
As of the census of 2010, there were 10 people, 5 households, and 3 families living in the village. The population density was 6.6 inhabitants per square mile (2.5/km^{2}). There were 5 housing units at an average density of 3.3 per square mile (1.3/km^{2}). The racial makeup of the village was 100.0% White.

There were 5 households, of which 60.0% were married couples living together and 40.0% were non-families. 20.0% of all households were made up of individuals. The average household size was 2.00 and the average family size was 2.33.

The median age in the village was 52.5 years. 0.0% of residents were under the age of 18; 0.0% were between the ages of 18 and 24; 20% were from 25 to 44; 70% were from 45 to 64; and 10% were 65 years of age or older. The gender makeup of the village was 40.0% male and 60.0% female.

=== 2000 census ===
As of the census of 2000, there were 10 people, 5 households, and 4 families living in the village. The population density was 7.6 people per square mile (2.9/km^{2}). There were 5 housing units at an average density of 3.8 per square mile (1.5/km^{2}). The racial makeup of the village was 100.00% White.

There were 5 households, out of which none had children under the age of 18 living with them, 80.0% were married couples living together, and 20.0% were non-families. 20.0% of all households were made up of individuals, and none had someone living alone who was 65 years of age or older. The average household size was 2.00 and the average family size was 2.25.

In the village, the population was spread out, with 10.0% from 18 to 24, 30.0% from 25 to 44, 40.0% from 45 to 64, and 20.0% who were 65 years of age or older. The median age was 45 years. For every 100 females, there were 66.7 males. For every 100 females age 18 and over, there were 66.7 males.

The median income for a household in the village was $70,000, and the median income for a family was $70,000. Males had a median income of $46,667 versus $41,250 for females. The per capita income for the village was $27,820. None of the population and none of the families were below the poverty line.

== Education ==
It is located in the Fort Osage R-I School District. Fort Osage High School is the zoned comprehensive high school.

Metropolitan Community College has the Fort Osage school district in its taxation area.
