= Gasconade, Missouri =

City in Gasconade County, Missouri, United States

- City
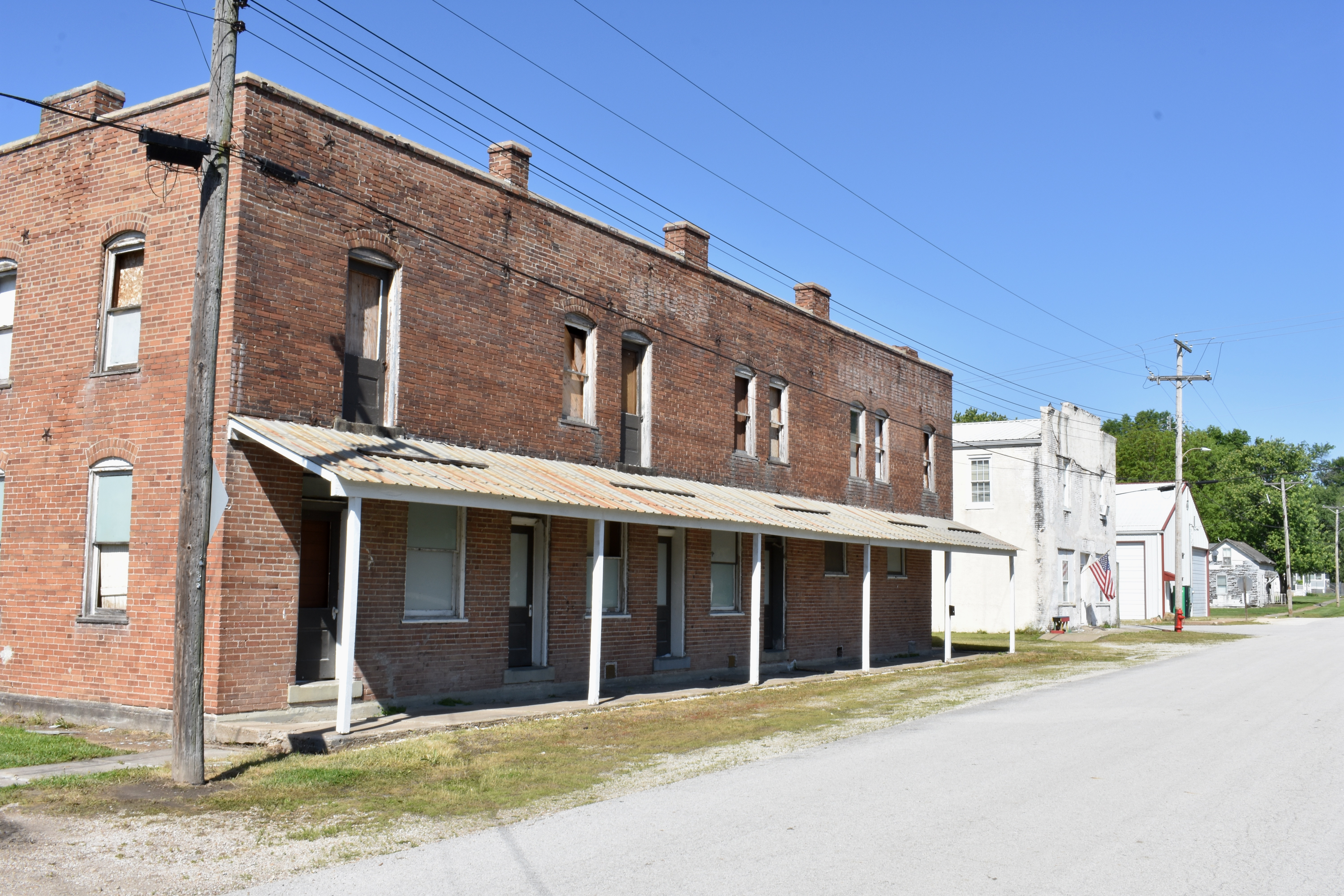
- The old Gasconade General Store Building

- Location of Gasconade, Missouri
- Coordinates: 38°40′13″N 91°33′36″W
- Country: United States
- State: Missouri
- County: Gasconade

Area
  - Total: 0.20 sq mi (0.53 km^{2})
  - Land: 0.20 sq mi (0.53 km^{2})
  - Water: 0 sq mi (0.00 km^{2})
- Elevation: 528 ft (161 m)

Population (2020)
  - Total: 172
  - Density: 847.5/sq mi (327.22/km^{2})
- Time zone: UTC-6 (Central (CST))
  - Summer (DST): UTC-5 (CDT)
- ZIP codes: 65036, 65061
- Area code: 573
- FIPS code: 29-26578
- GNIS feature ID: 2394867

Gasconade is a city in Gasconade County, Missouri, United States. The population is 172 as of the 2020 census.

== History ==
Gasconade was the original county seat of Gasconade County. The city was platted in 1857. It is situated at the mouth of the Gasconade River, from which it takes its name.

The Gasconade Bridge train disaster was a rail accident that took place in Gasconade on November 1, 1855, when the Gasconade bridge collapsed under the weight of the O'Sullivan locomotive. Thirty-one people were killed.

== Geography ==
According to the United States Census Bureau, the city has a total area of 0.20 square miles (0.52 km^{2}), all land.

== Demographics ==
Historical population
| Census | Pop. | Note | %± |
|---|---|---|---|
| 1930 | 375 | | — |
| 1940 | 494 | | 31.7% |
| 1950 | 448 | | −9.3% |
| 1960 | 333 | | −25.7% |
| 1970 | 235 | | −29.4% |
| 1980 | 250 | | 6.4% |
| 1990 | 253 | | 1.2% |
| 2000 | 267 | | 5.5% |
| 2010 | 223 | | −16.5% |
| 2020 | 172 | | −22.9% |
U.S. Decennial Census

=== 2010 census ===
As of the census of 2010, there were 223 people, 97 households, and 57 families residing in the city. The population density was 1,115.0 inhabitants per square mile (430.5/km^{2}). There were 138 housing units at an average density of 690.0 per square mile (266.4/km^{2}). The racial makeup of the city was 99.1% White, 0.4% African American, and 0.4% from two or more races.

There were 97 households, of which 23.7% had children under the age of 18 living with them, 38.1% were married couples living together, 14.4% had a female householder with no husband present, 6.2% had a male householder with no wife present, and 41.2% were non-families. 33.0% of all households were made up of individuals, and 21.6% had someone living alone who was 65 years of age or older. The average household size was 2.30 and the average family size was 2.89.

The median age in the city was 46.3 years. 23.3% of residents were under the age of 18; 5.7% were between the ages of 18 and 24; 17.9% were from 25 to 44; 29.2% were from 45 to 64; and 23.8% were 65 years of age or older. The gender makeup of the city was 47.5% male and 52.5% female.

=== 2000 census ===
As of the census of 2000, there were 267 people, 105 households, and 72 families residing in the city. The population density was 1,280.5 inhabitants per square mile (494.4/km^{2}). There were 141 housing units at an average density of 676.2 per square mile (261.1/km^{2}). The racial makeup of the city was 96.63% White, 0.75% Native American, 1.12% Asian, and 1.50% from two or more races.

There were 105 households, out of which 23.8% had children under the age of 18 living with them, 47.6% were married couples living together, 16.2% had a female householder with no husband present, and 31.4% were non-families. 28.6% of all households were made up of individuals, and 17.1% had someone living alone who was 65 years of age or older. The average household size was 2.54 and the average family size was 3.04.

In the city the population was spread out, with 26.6% under the age of 18, 7.5% from 18 to 24, 22.8% from 25 to 44, 22.8% from 45 to 64, and 20.2% who were 65 years of age or older. The median age was 39 years. For every 100 females, there were 81.6 males. For every 100 females age 18 and over, there were 78.2 males.

The median income for a household in the city was $27,404, and the median income for a family was $27,917. Males had a median income of $22,045 versus $18,594 for females. The per capita income for the city was $13,131. About 19.7% of families and 25.4% of the population were below the poverty line, including 40.5% of those under the age of eighteen and 13.7% of those 65 or over.

== Education ==
It is in the Gasconade County R-I School District.

== See also ==
- List of cities in Missouri
- List of populated places along the Missouri River
