= Frazer, Montana =

Frazer, Montana Watópʿana Oyą́ke (Assiniboine)
- CDP
- Location of Frazer, Montana
- Coordinates: 48°03′12″N 106°02′53″W
- Country: United States
- State: Montana
- County: Valley

Area
  - Total: 1.65 sq mi (4.27 km^{2})
  - Land: 1.62 sq mi (4.20 km^{2})
  - Water: 0.027 sq mi (0.07 km^{2})
- Elevation: 2,060 ft (630 m)

Population (2020)
  - Total: 354
  - Density: 218.2/sq mi (84.23/km^{2})
- Time zone: UTC-7 (Mountain (MST))
  - Summer (DST): UTC-6 (MDT)
- ZIP code: 59225
- Area code: 406
- FIPS code: 30-29275
- GNIS feature ID: 2408256

Frazer (Assiniboine: Watópʿana Oyą́ke) is a census-designated place (CDP) in Valley County, Montana, United States, located within the Fort Peck Indian Reservation, about 80 miles from the Canadian border. The population was 420 at the 2020 census.

The St. Paul, Minneapolis & Manitoba Railway established Frazer as a station in 1888. A post office opened in 1907.

== Geography ==
According to the United States Census Bureau, the CDP has a total area of 1.7 square miles (4.4 km^{2}), of which 1.7 square miles (4.4 km^{2}) is land and 0.04 square miles (0.10 km^{2}) (1.75%) is water.

== Demographics ==
Historical population
Census	Pop.	Note	%±
2020	354		—
U.S. Decennial Census

== Transportation ==
Amtrak’s Empire Builder, which operates between Seattle/Portland and Chicago, passes through the town on BNSF tracks, but makes no stop. The nearest station is located in Wolf Point, 19 miles (31 km) to the east.

== Education ==
Frazer School educates students from kindergarten through 12th grade. Frazer High School's team name is the Bearcubs.
