= Oacoma, South Dakota =

- Town
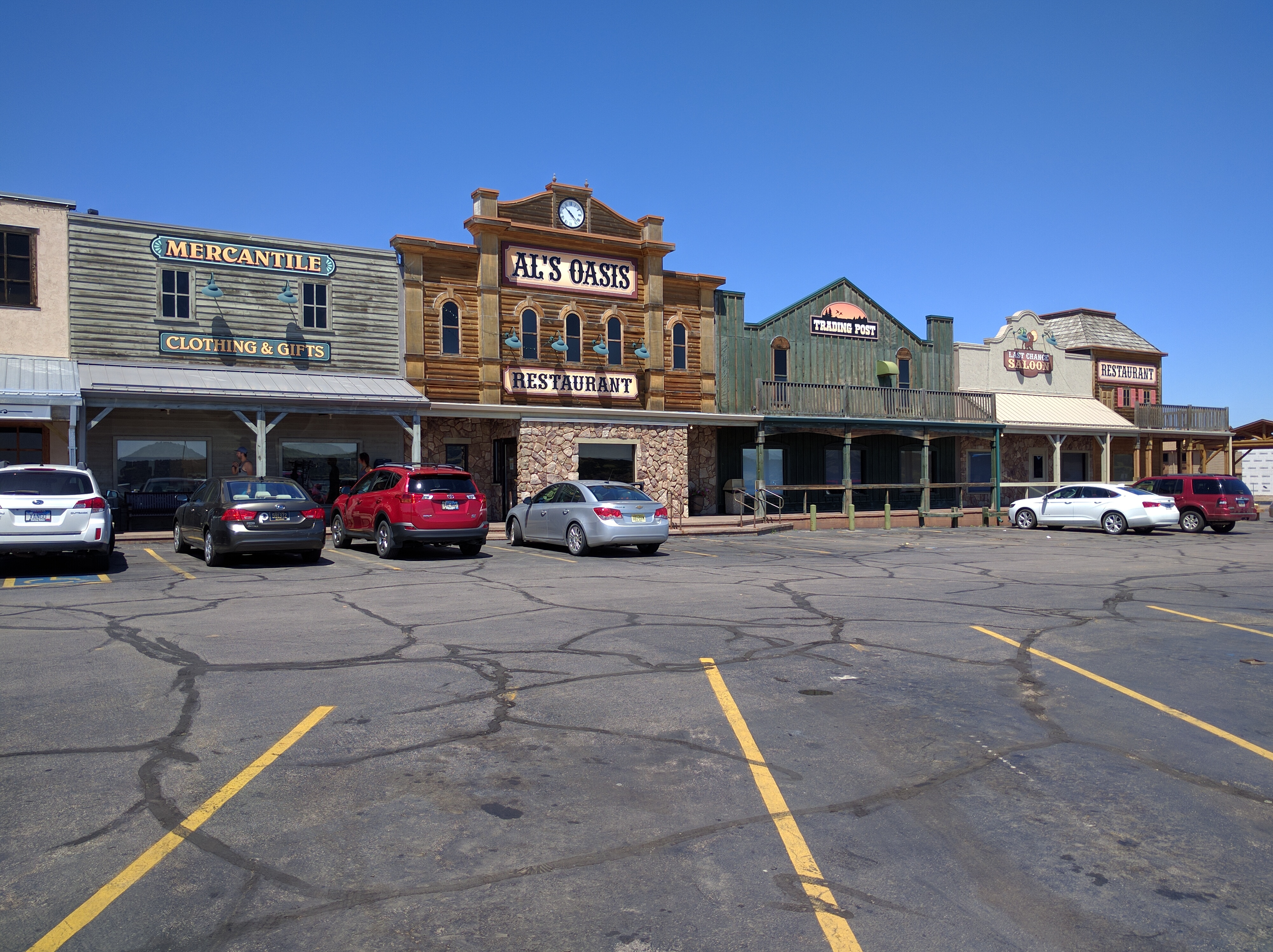
- Downtown Oacoma
- Motto: "One Day Just Isn't Enough"
- Location in Lyman County and the state of South Dakota
- Coordinates: 43°48′13″N 99°22′20″W
- Country: United States
- State: South Dakota
- County: Lyman
- Founded: 1890

Area
  - Total: 4.19 sq mi (10.86 km^{2})
  - Land: 2.61 sq mi (6.75 km^{2})
  - Water: 1.59 sq mi (4.11 km^{2})
- Elevation: 1,401 ft (427 m)

Population (2020)
  - Total: 386
  - Density: 148.2/sq mi (57.22/km^{2})
- Time zone: UTC-6 (Central (CST))
  - Summer (DST): UTC-5 (CDT)
- ZIP code: 57365
- Area code: 605
- FIPS code: 46-46180
- GNIS feature ID: 1267519
- Website: oacomasd.com

Oacoma is a town in Lyman County, South Dakota, United States. The population was 386 at the 2020 census. Oacoma is located on the west bank of the Missouri River, across from Chamberlain, South Dakota.

== History ==
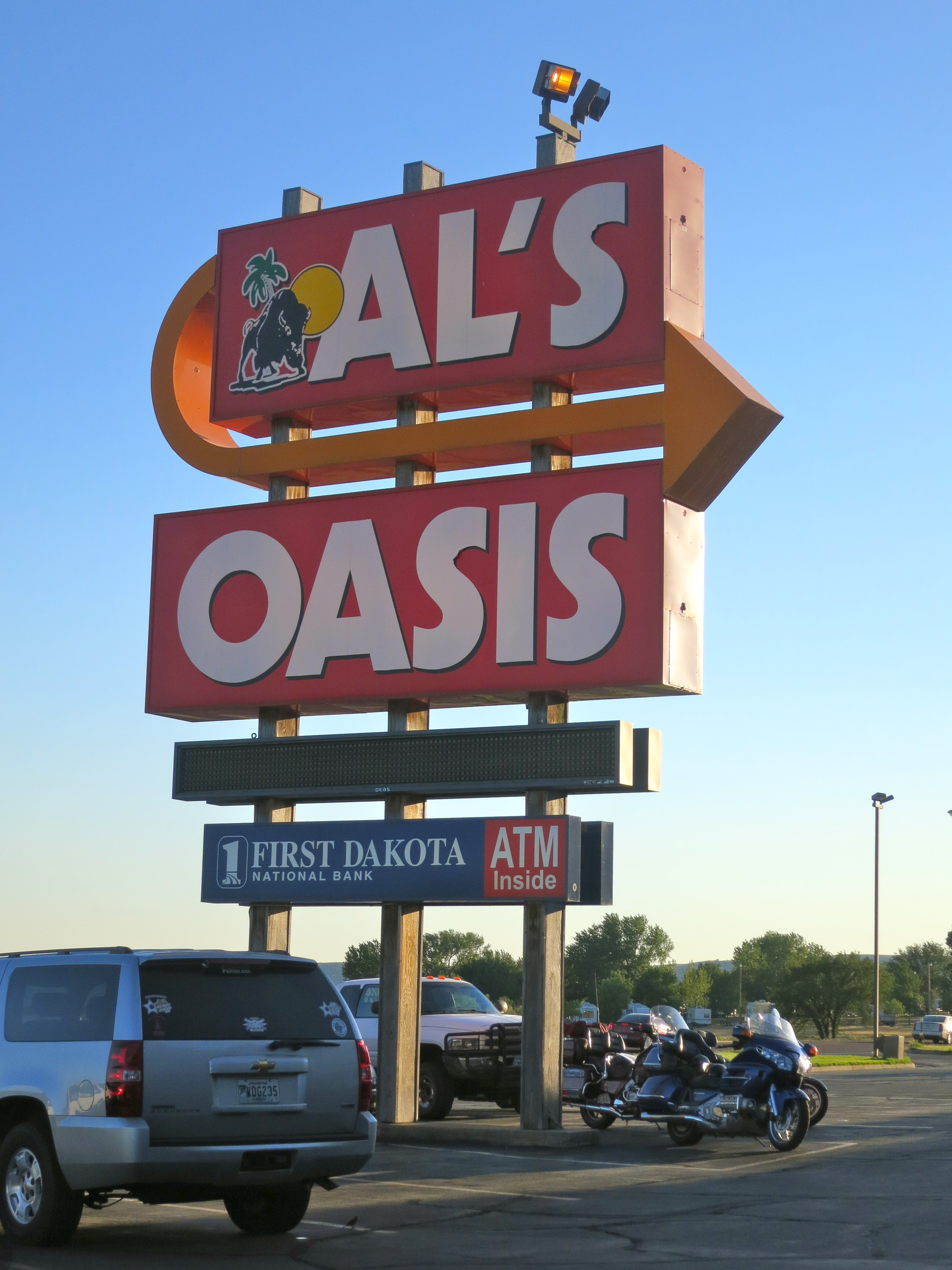
Al's Oasis, a stopping-off place in Oacoma along Interstate 90

On September 17, 1804, Lewis and Clark camped on the west bank of the Missouri River near American Island where Oacoma is now located. During the remainder of the 19th century the area was a stopping off place for explorers, fur traders and steamboat men. The township of Oacoma was laid out in 1891 as the county seat for the newly formed Lyman County; the County seat was transferred to the town of Kennebec in 1922. The Chicago, Milwaukee, St. Paul and Pacific Railroad arrived in Oacoma in 1905, and Oacoma was known as a "banking post-village". In the 21st century, it is a rest stop for travelers on Interstate 90.

== Geography ==
According to the United States Census Bureau, the town has a total area of 4.18 square miles (10.83 km^{2}), of which 2.59 square miles (6.71 km^{2}) is land and 1.59 square miles (4.12 km^{2}) is water.

American Crow Creek, a tributary to the Missouri River, enters the Missouri River in Oacoma.

The town is located approximately halfway between Sioux Falls and Rapid City.

== Demographics ==
Historical population
| Census | Pop. | Note | %± |
|---|---|---|---|
| 1910 | 235 | | — |
| 1920 | 224 | | −4.7% |
| 1930 | 167 | | −25.4% |
| 1940 | 197 | | 18.0% |
| 1950 | 231 | | 17.3% |
| 1960 | 312 | | 35.1% |
| 1970 | 215 | | −31.1% |
| 1980 | 289 | | 34.4% |
| 1990 | 367 | | 27.0% |
| 2000 | 390 | | 6.3% |
| 2010 | 451 | | 15.6% |
| 2020 | 386 | | −14.4% |
U.S. Decennial Census

=== 2010 census ===
As of the census of 2010, there were 451 people, 205 households, and 135 families residing in the town. The population density was 174.1 inhabitants per square mile (67.2/km^{2}). There were 236 housing units at an average density of 91.1 per square mile (35.2/km^{2}). The racial makeup of the town was 88.9% White, 0.2% African American, 6.4% Native American, 0.4% Asian, 0.7% from other races, and 3.3% from two or more races. Hispanic or Latino of any race were 1.8% of the population.

There were 205 households, of which 27.8% had children under the age of 18 living with them, 52.7% were married couples living together, 8.3% had a female householder with no husband present, 4.9% had a male householder with no wife present, and 34.1% were non-families. 30.2% of all households were made up of individuals, and 9.3% had someone living alone who was 65 years of age or older. The average household size was 2.20 and the average family size was 2.64.

The median age in the town was 44.3 years. 19.7% of residents were under the age of 18; 7.4% were between the ages of 18 and 24; 24.1% were from 25 to 44; 33.4% were from 45 to 64; and 15.3% were 65 years of age or older. The gender makeup of the town was 52.5% male and 47.5% female.

=== 2000 census ===
As of the census of 2000, there were 390 people, 169 households, and 111 families residing in the town. The population density was 192.8 inhabitants per square mile (74.4/km^{2}). There were 188 housing units at an average density of 92.9 per square mile (35.9/km^{2}). The racial makeup of the town was 94.36% White, 3.33% Native American, and 2.31% from two or more races. Hispanic or Latino of any race were 0.26% of the population.

There were 169 households, out of which 33.1% had children under the age of 18 living with them, 50.9% were married couples living together, 9.5% had a female householder with no husband present, and 34.3% were non-families. 29.0% of all households were made up of individuals, and 8.3% had someone living alone who was 65 years of age or older. The average household size was 2.31 and the average family size was 2.86.

In the town, the population was spread out, with 26.2% under the age of 18, 5.4% from 18 to 24, 30.3% from 25 to 44, 27.7% from 45 to 64, and 10.5% who were 65 years of age or older. The median age was 38 years. For every 100 females, there were 107.4 males. For every 100 females age 18 and over, there were 102.8 males.

The median income for a household in the town was $36,719, and the median income for a family was $44,250. Males had a median income of $26,500 versus $18,750 for females. The per capita income for the town was $17,206. About 8.4% of families and 7.4% of the population were below the poverty line, including 8.7% of those under age 18 and 16.7% of those age 65 or over.
