= Huntsdale, Missouri =

- Village
- Village of Huntsdale
- Location of Huntsdale in Missouri
- Coordinates: 38°54′43″N 92°28′43″W
- Country: United States
- State: Missouri
- County: Boone
- Incorporated: 1906
- Reincorporated: February 1, 2003

Area
  - Total: 0.30 sq mi (0.77 km^{2})
  - Land: 0.30 sq mi (0.77 km^{2})
  - Water: 0 sq mi (0.00 km^{2})
- Elevation: 574 ft (175 m)

Population (2020)
  - Total: 29
  - Density: 97.1/sq mi (37.49/km^{2})
- Time zone: UTC-6 (Central (CST))
  - Summer (DST): UTC-5 (CDT)
- ZIP code: 65203
- Area code: 573
- FIPS code: 29-33868
- GNIS feature ID: 2397004

Huntsdale is a village in Boone County, Missouri, United States. It is part of the Columbia, Missouri Metropolitan Statistical Area. The population was 31 at the 2010 census. The village was founded on August 1, 1892, and named after William Burch Hunt, a landowner. Huntsdale was first incorporated in 1906, but that status eventually fell into neglect and the last village council election took place in 1929. Due mainly to an influx of residential development in the area, Huntsdale was reincorporated in February 2003 and its first elections were held two months later. A center of activity in Huntsdale was Katfish Katy's, a small trail-side, seasonal restaurant along the Katy Trail State Park, until its closure in 2020.

== Geography ==
According to the United States Census Bureau, the village has a total area of 0.02 square miles (0.05 km^{2}), all land.

== Demographics ==
Historical population
Census	Pop.	Note	%±
1910	91		—
1930	151		—
2010	31		—
2020	29		−6.5%
U.S. Decennial Census

=== 2010 census ===
As of the census of 2010, there were 31 people, 15 households, and 11 families residing in the village. The population density was 1,550.0 inhabitants per square mile (598.5/km^{2}). There were 15 housing units at an average density of 750.0 per square mile (289.6/km^{2}). The racial makeup of the village was 100.0% White. Hispanic or Latino of any race were 3.2% of the population.

There were 15 households, of which 6.7% had children under the age of 18 living with them, 40.0% were married couples living together, 20.0% had a female householder with no husband present, 13.3% had a male householder with no wife present, and 26.7% were non-families. 20.0% of all households were made up of individuals, and 13.4% had someone living alone who was 65 years of age or older. The average household size was 2.07 and the average family size was 2.09.

The median age in the village was 50.5 years. 3.2% of residents were under the age of 18; 6.5% were between the ages of 18 and 24; 32.3% were from 25 to 44; 45.2% were from 45 to 64; and 12.9% were 65 years of age or older. The gender makeup of the village was 48.4% male and 51.6% female.

== Education ==
Its school district is Columbia 93 School District.
