= Sugar Creek, Missouri =

City in Jackson and Clay counties in Missouri, United States

- City
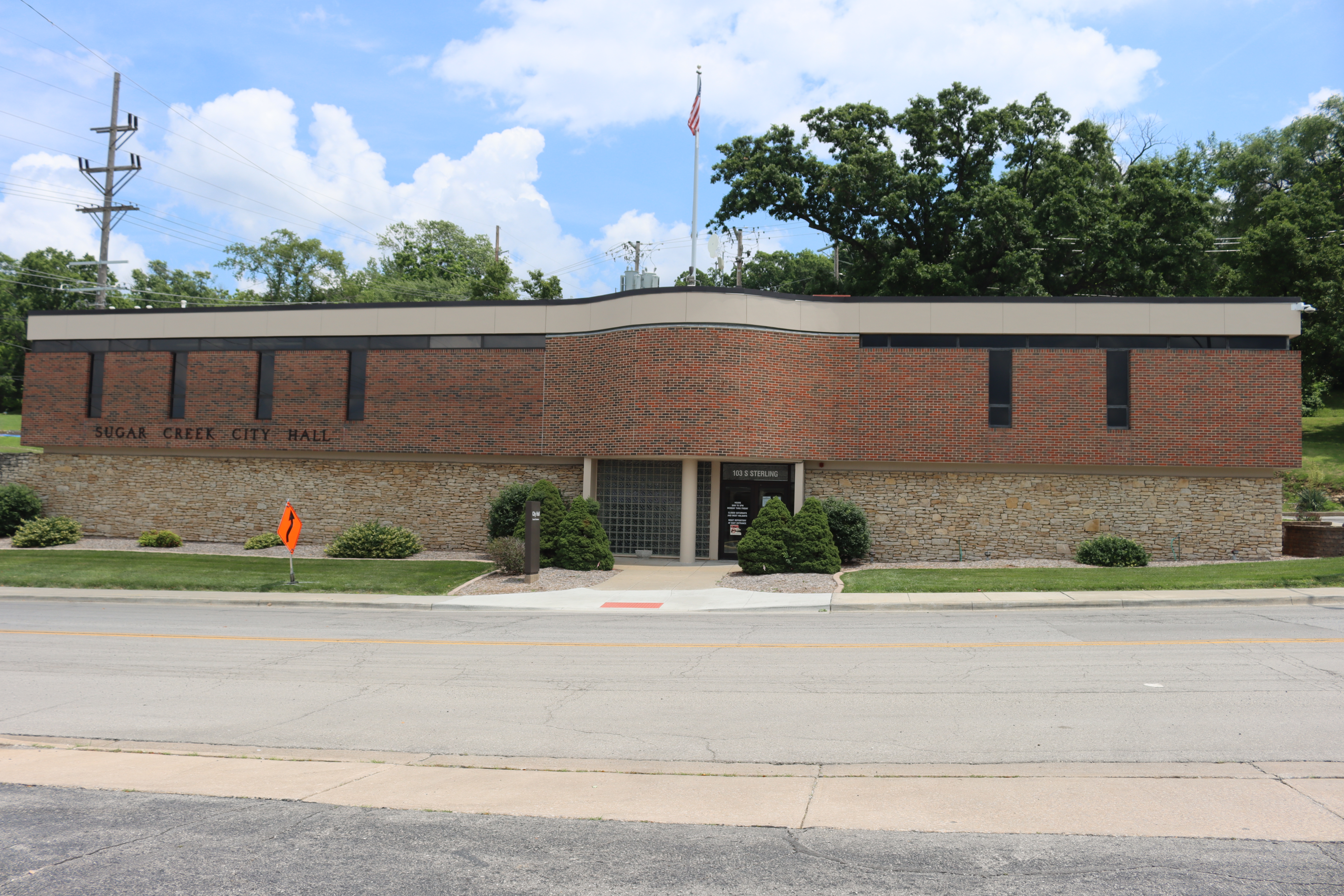
- City Hall

- Location of Sugar Creek, Missouri
- Coordinates: 39°08′36″N 94°23′58″W
- Country: United States
- State: Missouri
- Counties: Jackson, Clay

Area
  - Total: 11.65 sq mi (30.17 km^{2})
  - Land: 10.99 sq mi (28.46 km^{2})
  - Water: 0.66 sq mi (1.71 km^{2})
- Elevation: 886 ft (270 m)

Population (2020)
  - Total: 3,271
  - Density: 297.7/sq mi (114.93/km^{2})
- Time zone: UTC-6 (Central (CST))
  - Summer (DST): UTC-5 (CDT)
- ZIP code: 64054
- Area code: Area code 816
- FIPS code: 29-71368
- GNIS feature ID: 2395995
- Website: www.sugar-creek.mo.us

Sugar Creek is a city in both Jackson and Clay counties in Missouri, United States. The population was 3,271 at the 2020 census. It is part of the Kansas City metropolitan area.

== History ==
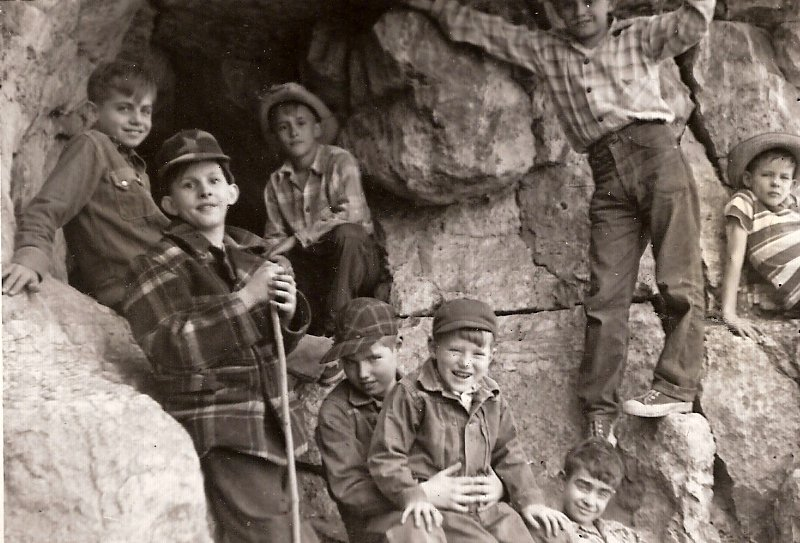
Kids exploring the Jesse James Cave, high on the bluffs overlooking the Missouri River near Sugar Creek, Missouri in 1950.

Like many cities along the Missouri River, Sugar Creek shows evidence of having once been the home of the Osage people. The city takes its name from nearby Sugar Creek.

On June 25, 1804, the Lewis and Clark Expedition camped on an island in the Missouri River opposite what is modern day Sugar Creek.

In the mid-1800s, the area now known as Sugar Creek served as an important link in America's westward expansion. Known as Upper Independence Landing originally, the territory along the Missouri River served as a port to receive supplies for early pioneers. It was renamed Wayne City Landing after an army lieutenant, Anthony Wayne. Wayne City, which is now on the national historic register, also received travelers who were headed west along the Oregon, California and Santa Fe Trails. In 1850, the first railroad west of the Mississippi River was constructed to join Wayne City and nearby Independence, Missouri.

From the early 1890s to the 1930s, the Sugar Creek area was home to a first-class pleasure resort, Fairmount Park. Among the park's attractions were a hotel, theater, lake, and carnival rides, including a roller coaster that at one time was the world's largest. A streetcar line brought visitors to the park from nearby Kansas City.

In 1903, Standard Oil of Indiana purchased land at the northern edge of the city. A new oil refinery was opened a year later and quickly spurred growth in the townsite of Sugar Creek. A number of immigrants from Eastern Europe came to work in the plant, and by 1918, the town had grown to more than 800 residents.

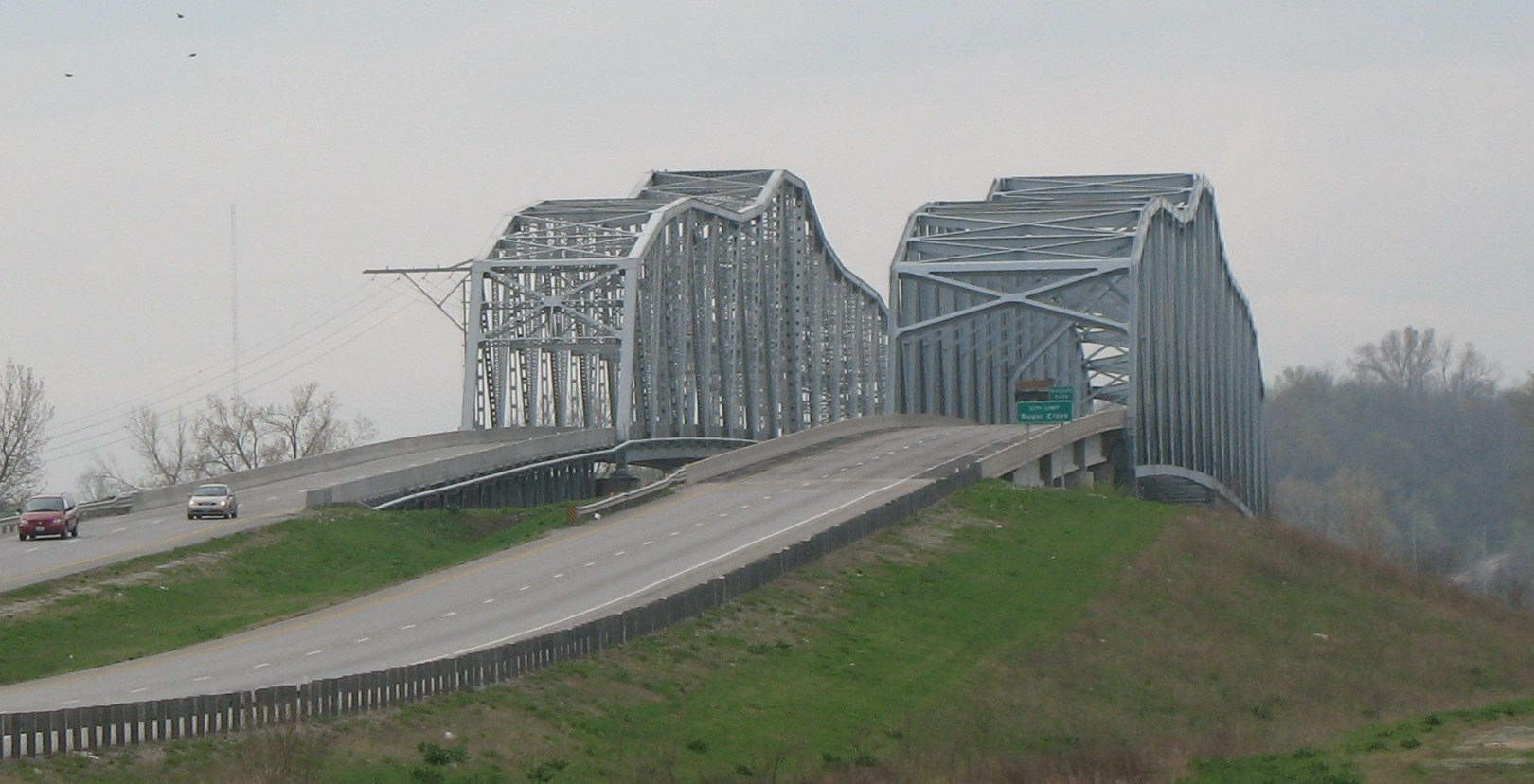
Liberty Bend Bridge, built in 1949 to replace the old Liberty Bend Bridge two miles north.

Shortly after World War I, businessmen and residents founded the Sugar Creek Improvement Association. The Association installed streetlights, set city limits and petitioned for incorporation as a city. On November 15, 1920, the City of Sugar Creek was officially born. The new town consisted of 564 acres (2.28 km^{2}) and had a population of around 1,800 residents. The city continued to grow and prosper in its early years. In 1958, an additional 294 acres (1.19 km^{2}) were annexed on the eastern side of the city, bringing new opportunities for development.

The Liberty Bend Bridge, in northeastern Sugar Creek, carries Route 291 across the Missouri River. The northbound bridge was built in 1949 when a new channel for the river was completed, and replaced the 1927 Liberty Bend Bridge which was about two miles to the north and crossed over the former river channel. Construction began in 1996 on the southbound bridge, which opened in 2001, and the northbound bridge was completely rehabilitated. It was part of an upgrade that changed Route 291 into a four-lane divided highway.

In the 2000s, BP America was involved in over 24 multimillion-dollar lawsuits for extreme polluting and causing unusual cancers in many people caused by its predecessors Amoco and Standard Oil at its Sugar Creek refinery which closed in 1982.

== Geography ==
According to the United States Census Bureau, the city has a total area of 11.33 square miles (29.34 km^{2}), of which 10.54 square miles (27.30 km^{2}) is land and 0.79 square miles (2.05 km^{2}) is water.

== Demographics ==
Historical population
| Census | Pop. | Note | %± |
|---|---|---|---|
| 1930 | 1,657 | | — |
| 1940 | 1,638 | | −1.1% |
| 1950 | 1,858 | | 13.4% |
| 1960 | 2,663 | | 43.3% |
| 1970 | 4,755 | | 78.6% |
| 1980 | 4,305 | | −9.5% |
| 1990 | 3,982 | | −7.5% |
| 2000 | 3,839 | | −3.6% |
| 2010 | 3,345 | | −12.9% |
| 2020 | 3,271 | | −2.2% |
U.S. Decennial Census

=== Racial and ethnic composition ===
Sugar Creek city, Missouri – Racial and ethnic composition Note: the US Census treats Hispanic/Latino as an ethnic category. This table excludes Latinos from the racial categories and assigns them to a separate category. Hispanics/Latinos may be of any race.
| Race / Ethnicity (NH = Non-Hispanic) | Pop 2000 | Pop 2010 | Pop 2020 | % 2000 | % 2010 | % 2020 |
|---|---|---|---|---|---|---|
| White alone (NH) | 3,532 | 2,911 | 2,521 | 92.00% | 87.03% | 77.07% |
| Black or African American alone (NH) | 30 | 81 | 120 | 0.78% | 2.42% | 3.67% |
| Native American or Alaska Native alone (NH) | 29 | 16 | 22 | 0.76% | 0.48% | 0.67% |
| Asian alone (NH) | 19 | 18 | 23 | 0.49% | 0.54% | 0.70% |
| Native Hawaiian or Pacific Islander alone (NH) | 17 | 20 | 17 | 0.44% | 0.60% | 0.52% |
| Other race alone (NH) | 2 | 0 | 14 | 0.05% | 0.00% | 0.43% |
| Mixed race or Multiracial (NH) | 54 | 63 | 230 | 1.41% | 1.88% | 7.03% |
| Hispanic or Latino (any race) | 156 | 236 | 324 | 4.06% | 7.06% | 9.91% |
| Total | 3,839 | 3,345 | 3,271 | 100.00% | 100.00% | 100.00% |

=== 2020 census ===
As of the 2020 census, Sugar Creek had a population of 3,271. The median age was 42.0 years. 20.1% of residents were under the age of 18 and 16.9% of residents were 65 years of age or older. For every 100 females there were 102.5 males, and for every 100 females age 18 and over there were 102.3 males age 18 and over.

95.4% of residents lived in urban areas, while 4.6% lived in rural areas.

There were 1,427 households in Sugar Creek, of which 24.8% had children under the age of 18 living in them. Of all households, 35.9% were married-couple households, 26.6% were households with a male householder and no spouse or partner present, and 28.1% were households with a female householder and no spouse or partner present. About 33.0% of all households were made up of individuals and 10.6% had someone living alone who was 65 years of age or older.

There were 1,580 housing units, of which 9.7% were vacant. The homeowner vacancy rate was 1.4% and the rental vacancy rate was 11.7%.

Racial composition as of the 2020 census
| Race | Number | Percent |
|---|---|---|
| White | 2,609 | 79.8% |
| Black or African American | 124 | 3.8% |
| American Indian and Alaska Native | 29 | 0.9% |
| Asian | 24 | 0.7% |
| Native Hawaiian and Other Pacific Islander | 17 | 0.5% |
| Some other race | 127 | 3.9% |
| Two or more races | 341 | 10.4% |

=== 2010 census ===
As of the census of 2010, there were 3,345 people, 1,420 households, and 852 families living in the city. The population density was 317.4 inhabitants per square mile (122.5/km^{2}). There were 1,627 housing units at an average density of 154.4 per square mile (59.6/km^{2}). The racial makeup of the city was 90.9% White, 2.5% African American, 0.5% Native American, 0.6% Asian, 0.6% Pacific Islander, 2.4% from other races, and 2.5% from two or more races. Hispanic or Latino of any race were 7.1% of the population.

There were 1,420 households, of which 27.5% had children under the age of 18 living with them, 39.0% were married couples living together, 14.9% had a female householder with no husband present, 6.1% had a male householder with no wife present, and 40.0% were non-families. 31.8% of all households were made up of individuals, and 11.2% had someone living alone who was 65 years of age or older. The average household size was 2.36 and the average family size was 2.96.

The median age in the city was 41.2 years. 21.4% of residents were under the age of 18; 8.8% were between the ages of 18 and 24; 24.1% were from 25 to 44; 30.4% were from 45 to 64; and 15.4% were 65 years of age or older. The gender makeup of the city was 50.3% male and 49.7% female.

=== 2000 census ===
As of the census of 2000, there were 3,839 people, 1,633 households, and 1,048 families living in the city. The population density was 465.0 inhabitants per square mile (179.5/km^{2}). There were 1,753 housing units at an average density of 212.4 per square mile (82.0/km^{2}). The racial makeup of the city was 93.83% White, 0.81% African American, 0.78% Native American, 0.52% Asian, 0.44% Pacific Islander, 1.67% from other races, and 1.95% from two or more races. Hispanic or Latino of any race were 4.06% of the population.

There were 1,633 households, out of which 24.8% had children under the age of 18 living with them, 46.2% were married couples living together, 12.1% had a female householder with no husband present, and 35.8% were non-families. 30.0% of all households were made up of individuals, and 10.4% had someone living alone who was 65 years of age or older. The average household size was 2.35 and the average family size was 2.87.

In the city the population was spread out, with 22.1% under the age of 18, 8.5% from 18 to 24, 29.9% from 25 to 44, 24.7% from 45 to 64, and 14.8% who were 65 years of age or older. The median age was 39 years. For every 100 females, there were 99.2 males. For every 100 females age 18 and over, there were 98.5 males.

The median income for a household in the city was $39,967, and the median income for a family was $46,208. Males had a median income of $35,341 versus $23,686 for females. The per capita income for the city was $20,784. About 10.3% of families and 10.8% of the population were below the poverty line, including 15.2% of those under age 18.

== Education ==
The majority of the city is within the Independence Public School District. The far eastern portions of Sugar Creek are in the Fort Osage School District.

Schools serving Sugar Creek residents include: Elm Grove, Abraham Mallinson, Sugar Creek and Mill Creek Elementary Schools; Bingham Middle School, Nowlin Middle School and Osage Trail Middle School; and Fort Osage High School, Van Horn High School and William Chrisman High School. Prior to Fall 2008, some of Sugar Creek and its schools were within the Kansas City, Missouri School District.

Metropolitan Community College has the Independence, Fort Osage, and Kansas City Missouri school districts in its taxation area.

Kansas City Public Library operates the Sugar Creek Library.

== Culture ==
- Sugar Creek Slavic Festival

== See also ==
- List of cities in Missouri
- Big Sugar Creek which is also in Missouri.
