= Toston, Montana =

- Census-designated place
- Location of Toston, Montana
- Coordinates: 46°09′57″N 111°26′45″W
- Country: United States
- State: Montana
- County: Broadwater

Area
  - Total: 2.84 sq mi (7.35 km^{2})
  - Land: 2.60 sq mi (6.73 km^{2})
  - Water: 0.24 sq mi (0.61 km^{2})
- Elevation: 3,914 ft (1,193 m)

Population (2020)
  - Total: 100
  - Density: 38.5/sq mi (14.85/km^{2})
- Time zone: UTC-7 (Mountain (MST))
  - Summer (DST): UTC-6 (MDT)
- ZIP codes: 59641, 59643
- Area code: 406
- FIPS code: 30-74500
- GNIS feature ID: 2409341

Toston is a census-designated place (CDP) in Broadwater County, Montana, United States. As of the 2020 census, Toston had a population of 100.

Thomas Toston settled in the area in 1871, establishing a ferry across the Missouri River. The post office opened in 1882. The Toston Smelting Company processed gold and silver ore from 1883 to 1899.

== Geography ==
Toston lies along Montana Highway 287. The Missouri River flows next to the town.

According to the United States Census Bureau, the CDP has a total area of 2.8 square miles (7.3 km^{2}), of which 2.6 square miles (6.7 km^{2}) is land and 0.23 square miles (0.6 km^{2}), or 8.35%, is water.

== Demographics ==
Historical population
Census	Pop.	Note	%±
2020	100		—
U.S. Decennial Census

As of the census of 2000, there were 105 people, 44 households, and 28 families residing in the CDP. The population density was 58.5 inhabitants per square mile (22.6/km^{2}). There were 51 housing units at an average density of 28.4 per square mile (11.0/km^{2}). The racial makeup of the CDP was 94.29% White, 0.95% Native American, and 4.76% from two or more races.

There were 44 households, out of which 27.3% had children under the age of 18 living with them, 56.8% were married couples living together, 6.8% had a female householder with no husband present, and 34.1% were non-families. 29.5% of all households were made up of individuals, and 6.8% had someone living alone who was 65 years of age or older. The average household size was 2.39 and the average family size was 2.97.

In the CDP, the population was spread out, with 25.7% under the age of 18, 4.8% from 18 to 24, 26.7% from 25 to 44, 35.2% from 45 to 64, and 7.6% who were 65 years of age or older. The median age was 40 years. For every 100 females, there were 118.8 males. For every 100 females age 18 and over, there were 122.9 males.

The median income for a household in the CDP was $21,250, and the median income for a family was $22,778. Males had a median income of $16,000 versus $0 for females. The per capita income for the CDP was $11,945. There were 26.5% of families and 42.2% of the population living below the poverty line, including 100.0% of under eighteens and 47.1% of those over 64.

== Education ==
It is within the Townsend K-12 Schools school district.

Toston students attend Townsend Elementary and Broadwater High School.
