= Levasy, Missouri =

- City
- Location of Levasy, Missouri
- Coordinates: 39°8′7″N 94°7′56″W
- Country: United States
- State: Missouri
- County: Jackson
- Incorporated: 1901

Government
  - Mayor: Phyllis Dieckmann

Area
  - Total: 0.60 sq mi (1.56 km^{2})
  - Land: 0.60 sq mi (1.56 km^{2})
  - Water: 0 sq mi (0.00 km^{2})
- Elevation: 709 ft (216 m)

Population (2020)
  - Total: 77
  - Density: 127.9/sq mi (49.37/km^{2})
- Time zone: UTC-6 (Central (CST))
  - Summer (DST): UTC-5 (CDT)
- ZIP code: 64066
- Area code: 816
- FIPS code: 29-41762
- GNIS feature ID: 0720926

Levasy is a city in Jackson County, Missouri, United States. The population was 77 at the 2020 census. It is part of the Kansas City metropolitan area.

== History ==
A post office called Levasy has been in operation since 1877. The city was named after William Wallace Livesay, an early settler.

== Geography ==
According to the United States Census Bureau, the city has a total area of 0.60 square miles (1.55 km^{2}), all land.

== Demographics ==
Historical population
Census	Pop.	Note	%±
1910	66		—
1920	146		121.2%
1930	215		47.3%
1940	126		−41.4%
1950	139		10.3%
1960	140		0.7%
1970	283		102.1%
1980	235		−17.0%
1990	279		18.7%
2000	108		−61.3%
2010	83		−23.1%
2020	77		−7.2%
U.S. Decennial Census

=== Racial and ethnic composition ===
Levasy city, Missouri – Racial and ethnic composition Note: the US Census treats Hispanic/Latino as an ethnic category. This table excludes Latinos from the racial categories and assigns them to a separate category. Hispanics/Latinos may be of any race.
Race / Ethnicity (NH = Non-Hispanic)	Pop 2000	Pop 2010	Pop 2020	% 2000	% 2010	% 2020
White alone (NH)	107	78	66	99.07%	93.98%	85.71%
Black or African American alone (NH)	0	0	0	0.00%	0.00%	0.00%
Native American or Alaska Native alone (NH)	1	0	0	0.93%	0.00%	0.00%
Asian alone (NH)	0	0	1	0.00%	0.00%	1.30%
Native Hawaiian or Pacific Islander alone (NH)	0	0	0	0.00%	0.00%	0.00%
Other race alone (NH)	0	0	2	0.00%	0.00%	2.60%
Mixed race or Multiracial (NH)	0	2	6	0.00%	2.41%	7.79%
Hispanic or Latino (any race)	0	3	2	0.00%	3.61%	2.60%
Total	108	83	77	100.00%	100.00%	100.00%

=== 2010 census ===
At the 2010 census there were 83 people in 39 households, including 27 families, in the city. The population density was 138.3 inhabitants per square mile (53.4/km^{2}). There were 47 housing units at an average density of 78.3 per square mile (30.2/km^{2}). The racial makup of the city was 97.6% White and 2.4% from two or more races. Hispanic or Latino of any race were 3.6%.

Of the 39 households, 20.5% had children under the age of 18 living with them, 56.4% were married couples living together, 5.1% had a female householder with no husband present, 7.7% had a male householder with no wife present, and 30.8% were non-families. 28.2% of households were one person, and 10.3% were one person aged 65 or older. The average household size was 2.13 and the average family size was 2.56.

The median age was 50.3 years. 14.5% of residents were under the age of 18; 4.7% were between the ages of 18 and 24; 24% were from 25 to 44; 39.7% were from 45 to 64; and 16.9% were 65 or older. The gender makeup of the city was 48.2% male and 51.8% female.

=== 2000 census ===
As of the census of 2000, there were 108 people in 40 households, including 33 families, in the city. The population density was 187.1 inhabitants per square mile (72.2/km^{2}). There were 46 housing units at an average density of 79.7 per square mile (30.8/km^{2}). The racial makup of the city was 99.07% White and 0.93% Native American.

Of the 40 households, 25.0% had children under the age of 18 living with them, 70.0% were married couples living together, 7.5% had a female householder with no husband present, and 17.5% were non-families. 17.5% of households were one person, and 7.5% were one person aged 65 or older. The average household size was 2.70 and the average family size was 2.97.

In the city the population was spread out, with 24.1% under the age of 18, 5.6% from 18 to 24, 29.6% from 25 to 44, 25.0% from 45 to 64, and 15.7% 65 or older. The median age was 42 years. For every 100 females, there were 107.7 males. For every 100 females age 18 and over, there were 105.0 males.

The median household income was $51,250 and the median family income was $60,250. Males had a median income of $40,000 versus $24,688 for females. The per capita income for the city was $17,016. There were 3.2% of families and 5.1% of the population living below the poverty line, including 3.3% of under eighteens and 23.1% of those over 64.

== Education ==
It is in the Fort Osage R-I School District. Fort Osage High School is the zoned comprehensive high school.

Metropolitan Community College has the Fort Osage school district in its taxation area.
