= Sibley, Missouri =

- Village
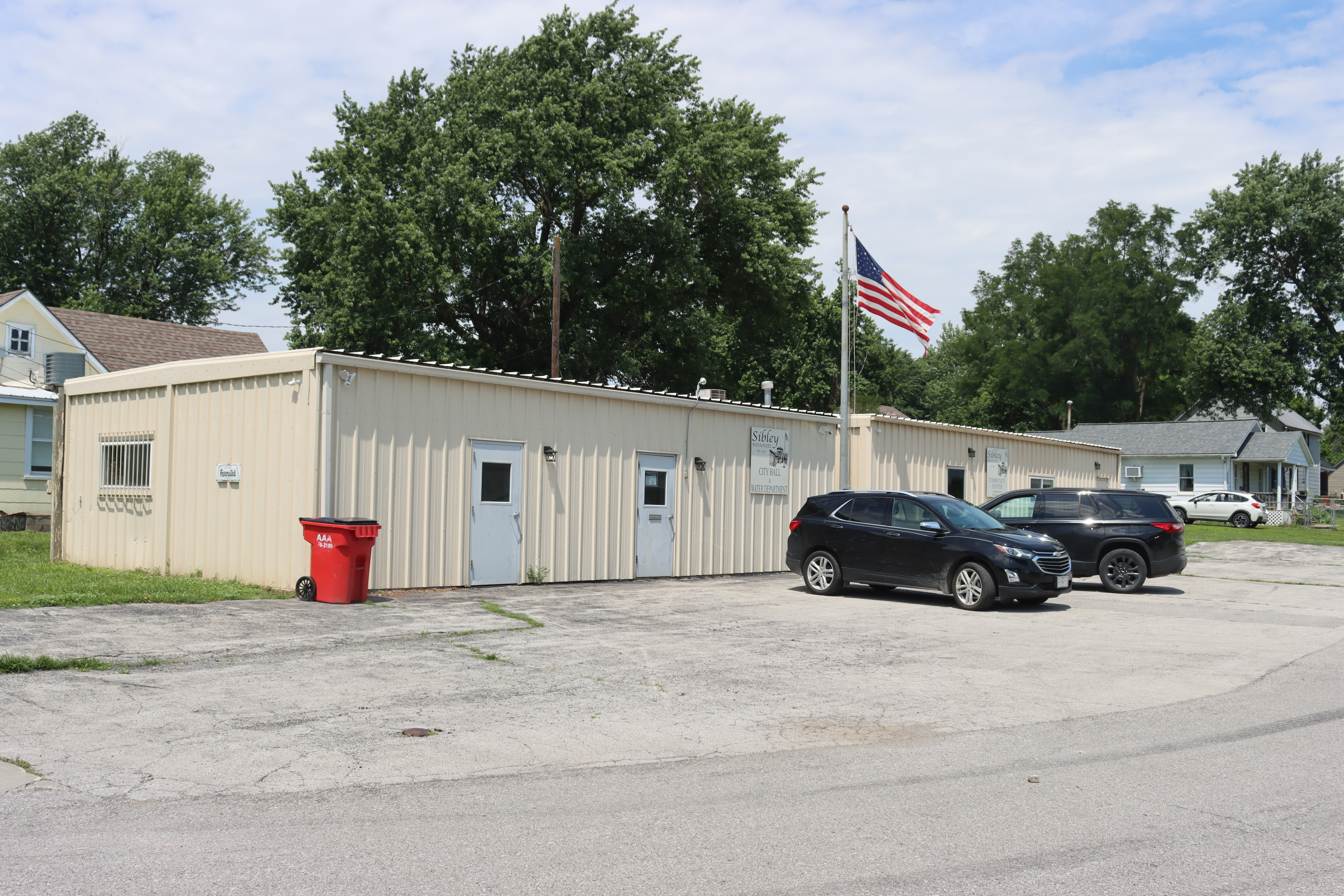
- City Hall

- Location of Sibley, Missouri
- Coordinates: 39°10′49″N 94°11′45″W
- Country: United States
- State: Missouri
- County: Jackson
- Incorporated: 1957

Area
  - Total: 1.04 sq mi (2.70 km^{2})
  - Land: 1.04 sq mi (2.70 km^{2})
  - Water: 0 sq mi (0.00 km^{2})
- Elevation: 807 ft (246 m)

Population (2020)
  - Total: 314
  - Density: 301.0/sq mi (116.22/km^{2})
- Time zone: UTC-6 (Central (CST))
  - Summer (DST): UTC-5 (CDT)
- ZIP code: 64088
- Area code: 816
- FIPS code: 29-67718
- GNIS feature ID: 0735854

Sibley is a village in Jackson County, Missouri, United States. The population was 314 at the 2020 census. It is known as the home of Fort Osage National Historic Landmark. It is part of the Kansas City metropolitan area.

== History ==
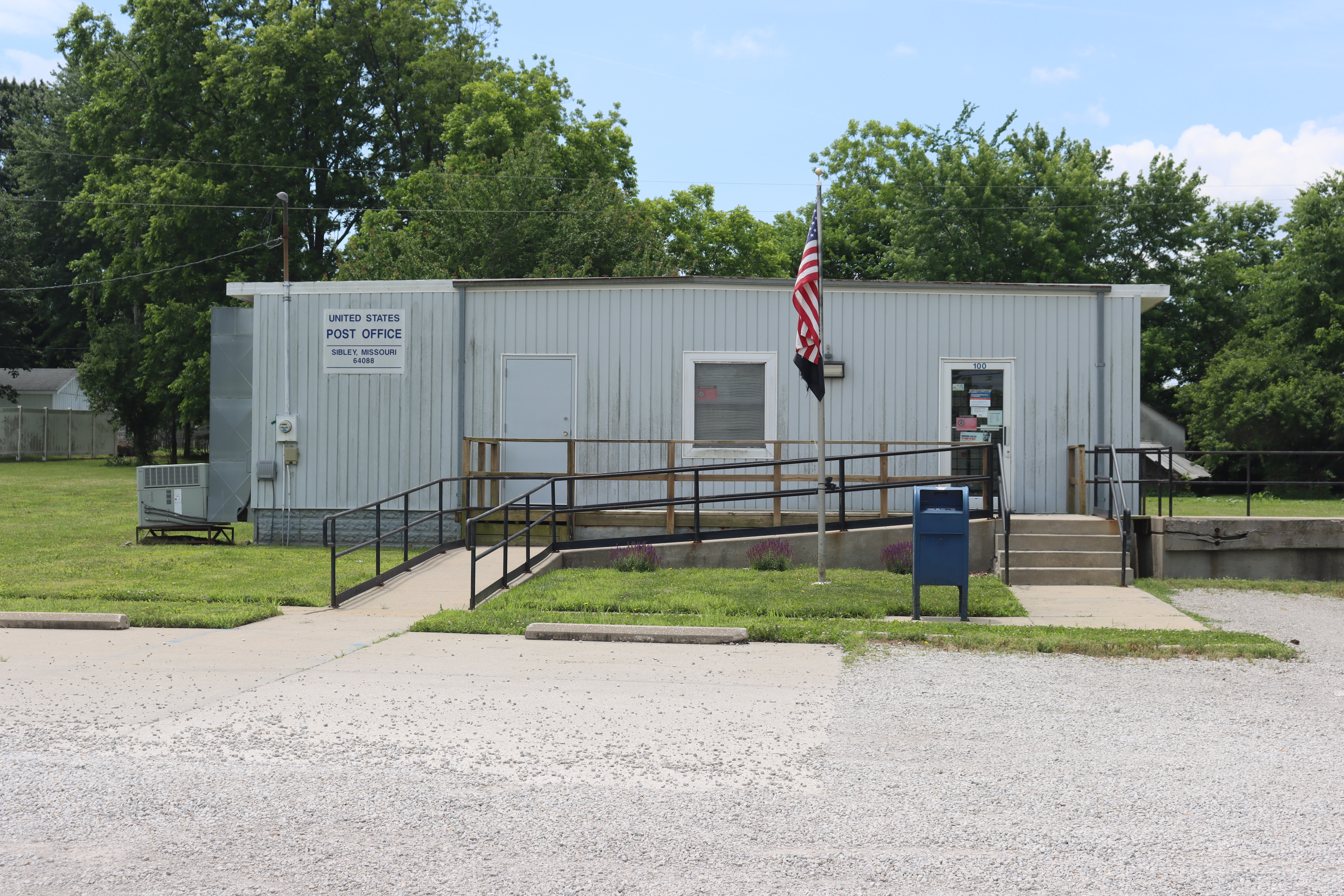
The Sibley Post Office

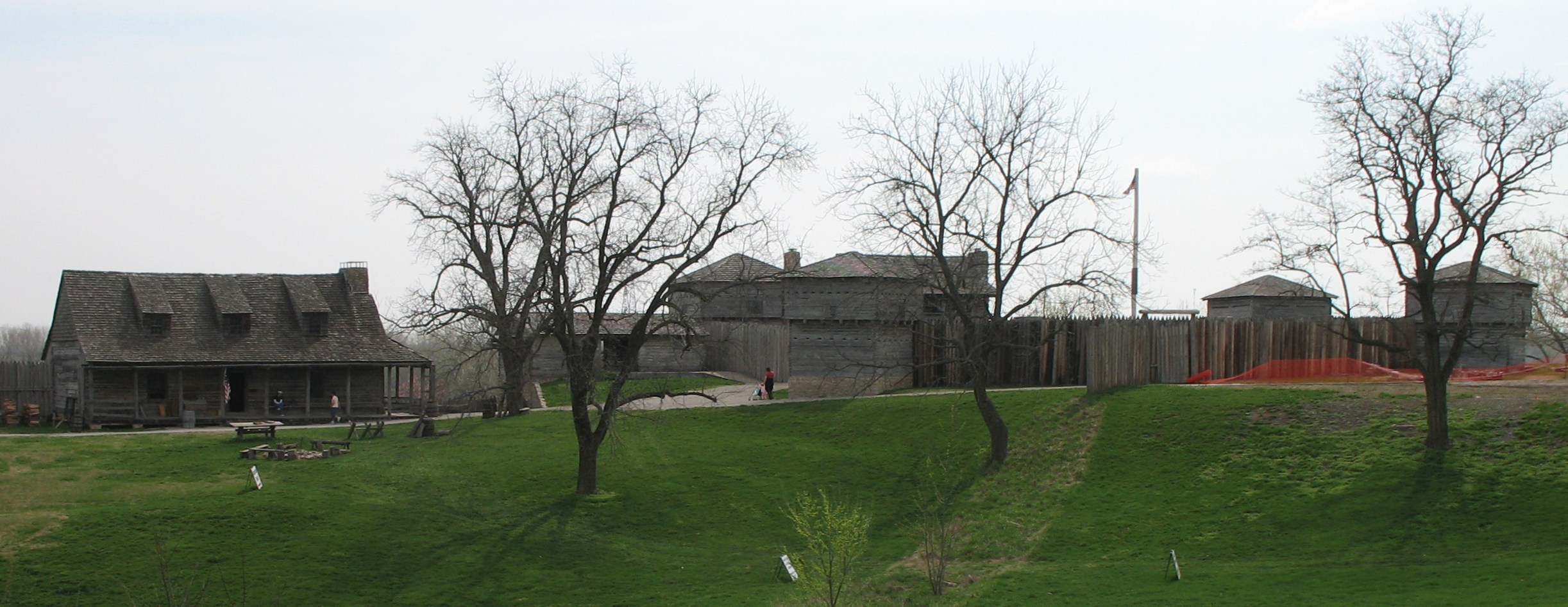
Fort Osage from the west. The "factory" trading post is on the left.

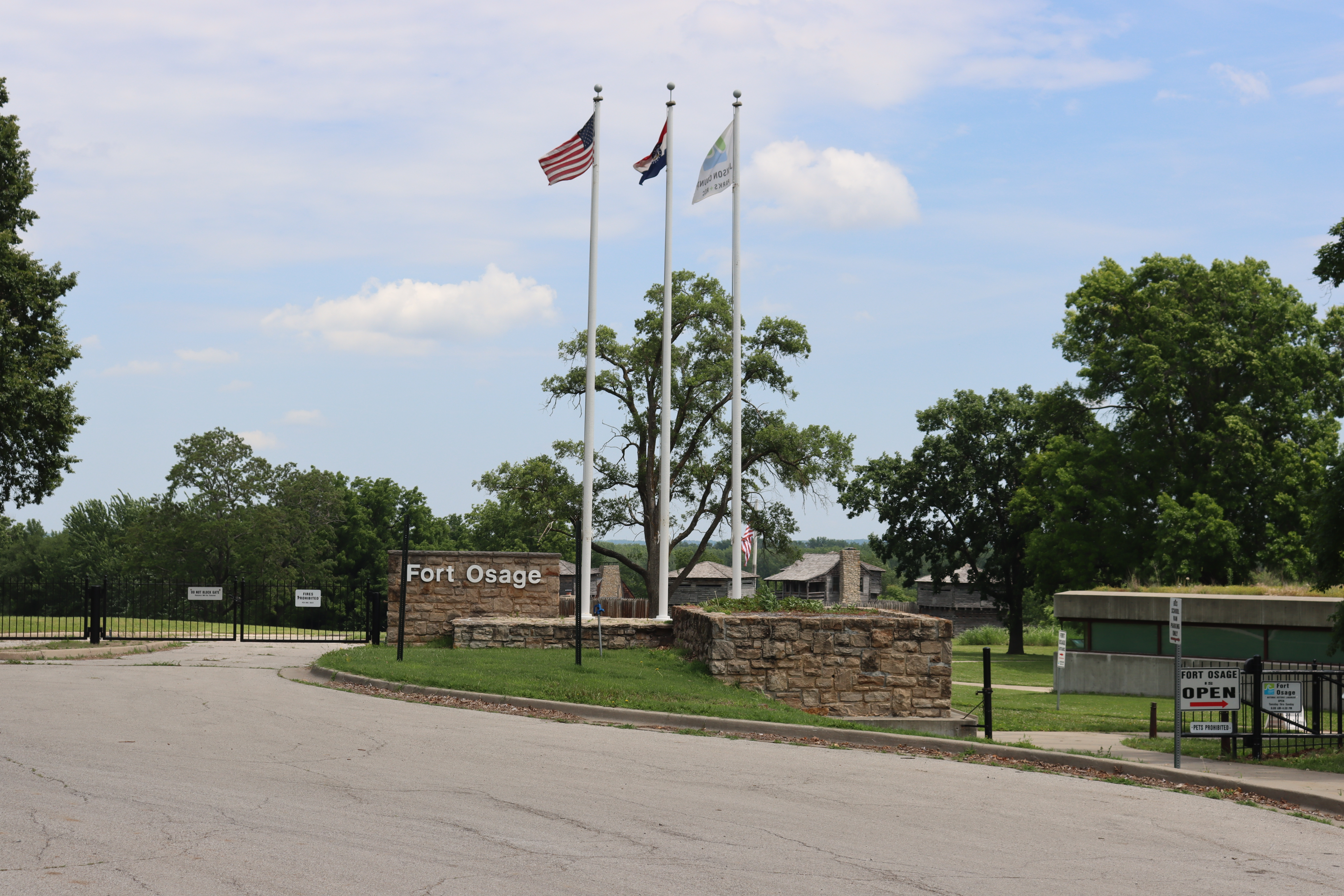
The entrance to Fort Osage

Sibley was platted in 1836 as one of the oldest communities in Jackson County. The village was named for George C. Sibley, the first Indian agent and postmaster of Fort Osage from 1818 to 1825.

It was settled on a bluff overlooking the Missouri River in the northeast corner of the county. One of its first homes was built by George C. Sibley. The second home was erected in 1822 by Abraham McCellan. A post office called Sibley has been in operation since 1842.

During the Civil War, most of the village was burned by federal soldiers who decided it was a stronghold of opposing forces because bushwhackers fired upon them as they moved along the river. At least 50 total houses were in the village, of which at least 36 were burned.

== Geography ==
Sibley is located at 39°10′49″N 94°11′45″W (39.180338, -94.195940).

According to the United States Census Bureau, the village has a total area of 1.04 square miles (2.69 km^{2}), all land.

== Demographics ==
Historical population
Census	Pop.	Note	%±
1960	177		—
1970	279		57.6%
1980	382		36.9%
1990	367		−3.9%
2000	347		−5.4%
2010	357		2.9%
2020	314		−12.0%
U.S. Decennial Census

=== Racial and ethnic composition ===
Sibley village, Missouri – Racial and ethnic composition Note: the US Census treats Hispanic/Latino as an ethnic category. This table excludes Latinos from the racial categories and assigns them to a separate category. Hispanics/Latinos may be of any race.
Race / Ethnicity (NH = Non-Hispanic)	Pop 2000	Pop 2010	Pop 2020	% 2000	% 2010	% 2020
White alone (NH)	326	330	294	93.95%	92.44%	93.63%
Black or African American alone (NH)	4	0	0	1.15%	0.00%	0.00%
Native American or Alaska Native alone (NH)	4	3	1	1.15%	0.84%	0.32%
Asian alone (NH)	1	0	2	0.29%	0.00%	0.64%
Native Hawaiian or Pacific Islander alone (NH)	0	0	0	0.00%	0.00%	0.00%
Other race alone (NH)	0	0	2	0.00%	0.00%	0.64%
Mixed race or Multiracial (NH)	1	10	8	0.29%	2.80%	2.55%
Hispanic or Latino (any race)	11	14	7	3.17%	3.92%	2.23%
Total	347	357	314	100.00%	100.00%	100.00%

=== 2010 census ===
As of the census of 2010, there were 357 people, 129 households, and 98 families living in the village. The population density was 343.3 inhabitants per square mile (132.5/km^{2}). There were 141 housing units at an average density of 135.6 per square mile (52.4/km^{2}). The racial makeup of the village was 96.4% White, 0.8% Native American, and 2.8% from two or more races. Hispanic or Latino of any race were 3.9% of the population.

There were 129 households, of which 37.2% had children under the age of 18 living with them, 61.2% were married couples living together, 8.5% had a female householder with no husband present, 6.2% had a male householder with no wife present, and 24.0% were non-families. 19.4% of all households were made up of individuals, and 10.1% had someone living alone who was 65 years of age or older. The average household size was 2.77 and the average family size was 3.14.

The median age in the village was 40.1 years. 24.4% of residents were under the age of 18; 9.8% were between the ages of 18 and 24; 23.1% were from 25 to 44; 25.5% were from 45 to 64; and 17.4% were 65 years of age or older. The gender makeup of the village was 49.6% male and 50.4% female.

=== 2000 census ===
As of the census of 2000, there were 347 people, 128 households, and 94 families living in the village. The population density was 332.9 inhabitants per square mile (128.5/km^{2}). There were 133 housing units at an average density of 127.6 per square mile (49.3/km^{2}). The racial makeup of the village was 95.97% White, 1.44% African American, 1.15% Native American, 0.29% Asian, 0.86% from other races, and 0.29% from two or more races. Hispanic or Latino of any race were 3.17% of the population.

There were 128 households, out of which 37.5% had children under the age of 18 living with them, 70.3% were married couples living together, 2.3% had a female householder with no husband present, and 25.8% were non-families. 20.3% of all households were made up of individuals, and 9.4% had someone living alone who was 65 years of age or older. The average household size was 2.71 and the average family size was 3.18.

In the village, the population was spread out, with 25.9% under the age of 18, 8.4% from 18 to 24, 28.8% from 25 to 44, 23.9% from 45 to 64, and 13.0% who were 65 years of age or older. The median age was 37 years. For every 100 females, there were 112.9 males. For every 100 females age 18 and over, there were 97.7 males.

The median income for a household in the village was $45,000, and the median income for a family was $50,417. Males had a median income of $40,313 versus $28,125 for females. The per capita income for the village was $17,100. About 2.1% of families and 5.4% of the population were below the poverty line, including 2.2% of those under age 18 and 16.7% of those age 65 or over.

== Education ==
It is in the Fort Osage R-I School District. Fort Osage High School is the zoned comprehensive high school.

Metropolitan Community College has the Fort Osage school district in its taxation area.

== Transportation ==
Sibley is located on the Marceline Subdivision of the Southern Transcon route of the BNSF Railway. This is the main transcontinental route between Los Angeles and Chicago, and carries an average of 90 freight trains per day. By October 2018, the entire Southern Transcon was double-tracked, except for the Sibley Railroad Bridge and one other bridge; the crossing of the Salt Fork Arkansas River at Alva, Oklahoma.
