= Missouri's 11th Senate district =

American legislative district

Missouri's 11th State Senate district
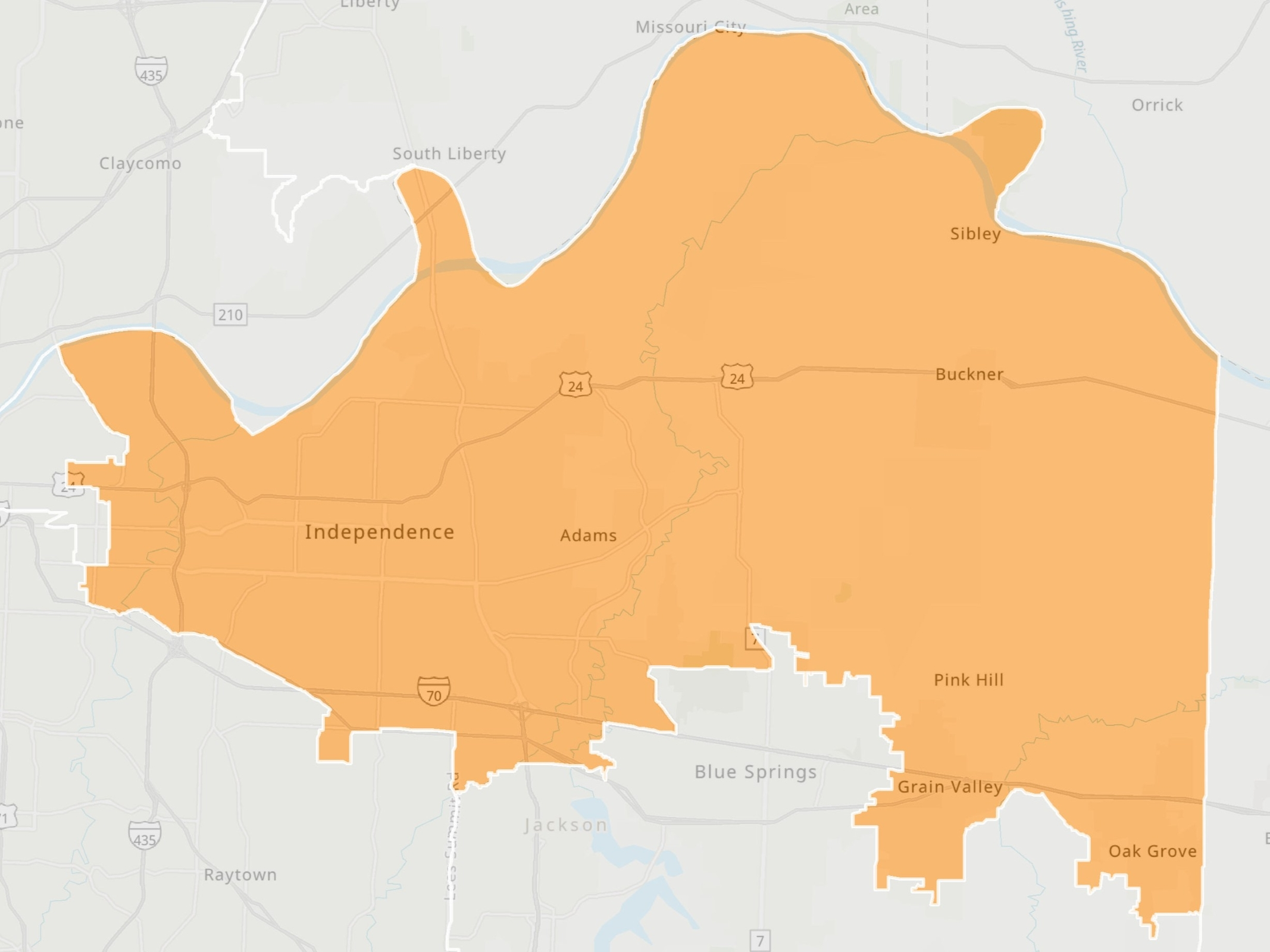
Senator
Joe Nicola; R–Grain Valley
- Demographics: 69% White; 9% Black; 15% Hispanic; 1% Asian; 1% Hawaiian/Pacific Islander; 1% Other; 4% Multiracial
- Population (2023): 184,023

Missouri's 11th Senatorial District is one of 34 districts in the Missouri Senate. The district has been represented by Republican Joe Nicola since 2025.

== Geography ==
The district is based in the Kansas City metropolitan area, stretching from eastern Kansas City to exurbs on the edge of Jackson County. Major cities in the district include Buckner, Grain Valley, Independence, and Oak Grove. The district is also home to the Harry S. Truman Presidential Library and Museum, the Harry S. Truman National Historic Site, and the Midwest Genealogy Center.

== Election results (1996–2024) ==
=== 1996 ===
Missouri's 11th Senatorial District election (1996)
Party	Candidate	Votes	%
Democratic	Ronnie DePasco	36,252	100.00
Total votes		36,252	100.00
Democratic hold			

=== 2000 ===
Missouri's 11th Senatorial District election (2000)
Party	Candidate	Votes	%
Democratic	Ronnie DePasco (incumbent)	35,519	87.41
Libertarian	Jeanne Bojarski	5,118	12.59
Total votes		40,637	100.00
Democratic hold			

=== 2003 ===
Missouri's 11th Senatorial District special election (2003)
Party	Candidate	Votes	%
Democratic	Victor Callahan	5,738	61.99
Republican	Lynn Vogel	2,529	27.32
Write-In	Sharon Kelley	989	10.69
Total votes		9,256	100.00
Democratic hold			

=== 2004 ===
Missouri's 11th Senatorial District election (2004)
Party	Candidate	Votes	%
Democratic	Victor Callahan (incumbent)	47,517	62.62
Republican	Chet Southworth	27,257	35.92
Constitution	Keith M. Kadlec	1,111	1.46
Total votes		75,885	100.00
Democratic hold			

=== 2008 ===
Missouri's 11th Senatorial District election (2008)
Party	Candidate	Votes	%
Democratic	Victor Callahan (incumbent)	62,128	100.00
Total votes		62,128	100.00
Democratic hold			

=== 2012 ===
Missouri's 11th Senatorial District election (2012)
Party	Candidate	Votes	%
Democratic	Paul LeVota	50,824	100.00
Total votes		50,824	100.00
Democratic hold			

=== 2016 ===
Missouri's 11th Senatorial District election (2016)
Party	Candidate	Votes	%
Democratic	John Joseph Rizzo	33,071	52.17
Republican	Brent Thurston Lasater	30,318	47.83
Total votes		63,389	100.00
Democratic hold			

=== 2020 ===
Missouri's 11th Senatorial District election (2020)
Party	Candidate	Votes	%
Democratic	John Joseph Rizzo (incumbent)	50,065	100.00
Total votes		50,065	100.00
Democratic hold			

=== 2024 ===
Missouri's 11th Senatorial District election (2024)
Party	Candidate	Votes	%
Republican	Joe Nicola	37,008	52.35
Democratic	Robert Sauls	33,680	47.65
Total votes		70,688	100.00
Republican gain from Democratic			

== Statewide election results ==
Year	Office	Results
2008	President	Obama 50.6 – 47.6%
2012	President	Romney 51.6 – 48.4%
2016	President	Trump 54.6 – 39.4%
2016	Senate	Kander 49.6 – 44.1%
2016	Governor	Greitens 48.4 – 47.2%
2018	Senate	Hawley 48.6 – 47.4%
2020	President	Trump 54.6 – 43.3%
2020	Governor	Parson 53.9 – 43.1%
