= 2025 Jackson County Executive recall election =

- September 30, 2025
- Recall Jackson County Executive Frank White Jr.

Results
Choice	Votes	%
Yes	64,469	85.21%
No	11,191	14.79%

The 2025 Jackson County, Missouri Executive recall election took place on September 30, 2025. Incumbent County Executive Frank White, who has served as County Executive since 2016, was recalled in a landslide, with 85 percent of voters supporting White's removal. The County Legislature will select a replacement to serve out the remainder of White's term, which expires in 2027.

== Background ==
White was first appointed as Jackson County Executive in 2016, following the resignation of Mike Sanders, who was ultimately sentenced to prison for fraud. White was elected to serve out the remainder of Sanders' term in a special election later that year, and was re-elected in 2018 and 2022.

Controversy over rising real estate assessments prompted several unsuccessful recall campaigns against White. In 2024, Democracy in Action, a dark money group, began financing the recall campaign against Jackson, which he alleged was backed by construction firms who wanted to build a new stadium for the Kansas City Royals.

On June 30, 2025, the Jackson County Election Board announced that enough signatures had been collected to present the recall election to the County Legislature. The County Legislature approved the recall and scheduled it for August 26, 2025, over the protests of the Election Board, which argued that the date was too soon. White subsequently vetoed the recall election, which the County Legislature overrode. The County Election Board sought to move the recall election to November 4, 2025, and 16th Circuit Court Judge Marty Wayne Seaton ultimately scheduled the election for September 30, 2025.

White subsequently appealed Seaton's decision, and on September 26, 2025, asked the Missouri Court of Appeals to schedule the election for November. It denied the request on September 29, allowing the recall election to proceed. White appealed to the Missouri Supreme Court, which denied his petition.

== Results ==
2025 Jackson County Executive recall election
Choice	Votes	%
For	64,469	85.21
Against	11,191	14.79
Total	75,660	100.00
Source: Jackson County Election Board, Kansas City Election Board
