= 2002 Jackson County Executive election =

- November 5, 2002

| Nominee | Katheryn Shields | Pat Kelley |
| Party | Democratic | Republican |
| Popular vote | 116,720 | 74,633 |
| Percentage | 59.54% | 38.07% |
County Executive before election
Katheryn Shields
Democratic
Elected County Executive
Katheryn Shields
Democratic

The 2002 Jackson County Executive election took place on November 5, 2002. Incumbent Democratic County Executive Katheryn Shields ran for re-election to a third term.

Shields initially faced a challenge in the Democratic primary from State Senator Ronnie DePasco, but he ultimately withdrew from the race. Shields won the primary in a landslide, and faced Republican State Representative Pat Kelley in the general election. She defeated Kelley by a wide margin, becoming the first County Executive to be elected to three terms.

== Democratic primary ==
=== Candidates ===
- Katheryn Shields, incumbent County Executive
- John Speakman Cowboy, convenience store worker

==== Withdrawn ====
- Ronnie DePasco, State Senator

==== Declined ====
- Greg Grounds, Mayor of Blue Springs
- Karen Messerli, Mayor of Lee's Summit
- Pat McInerney, former Assistant U.S. Attorney

=== Results ===
Democratic primary results
| Party | Candidate | Votes | % |
|---|---|---|---|
| Democratic | Katheryn Shields (inc.) | 36,648 | 81.56% |
| Democratic | John Speakman Cowboy | 8,285 | 18.44% |
| Total votes | | 44,933 | 100.00% |

== Republican primary ==
=== Candidates ===
- Pat Kelley, State Representative

=== Results ===
Republican primary results
| Party | Candidate | Votes | % |
|---|---|---|---|
| Republican | Pat Kelley | 26,052 | 100.00% |
| Total votes | | 26,052 | 100.00% |

== Reform primary ==
=== Candidates ===
- Richard Charles Tolbert, former Kansas City Councilman

=== Results ===
Reform primary results
| Party | Candidate | Votes | % |
|---|---|---|---|
| Reform | Richard Charles Tolbert | 108 | 100.00% |
| Total votes | | 108 | 100.00% |

== General election ==
=== Results ===
2002 Jackson County Executive election
| Party | Candidate | Votes | % |
|---|---|---|---|
| Democratic | Katheryn Shields (inc.) | 116,720 | 59.54% |
| Republican | Pat Kelley | 74,633 | 38.07% |
| Reform | Richard Charles Tolbert | 4,686 | 2.39% |
| Total votes | | 196,039 | 100.00% |
| Democratic hold | | | |
