= 2007 Kansas City mayoral election =

- March 2, 2007 (primary); April 4, 2007 (general)
- Turnout: 18.8% (primary); 27.1% (general)
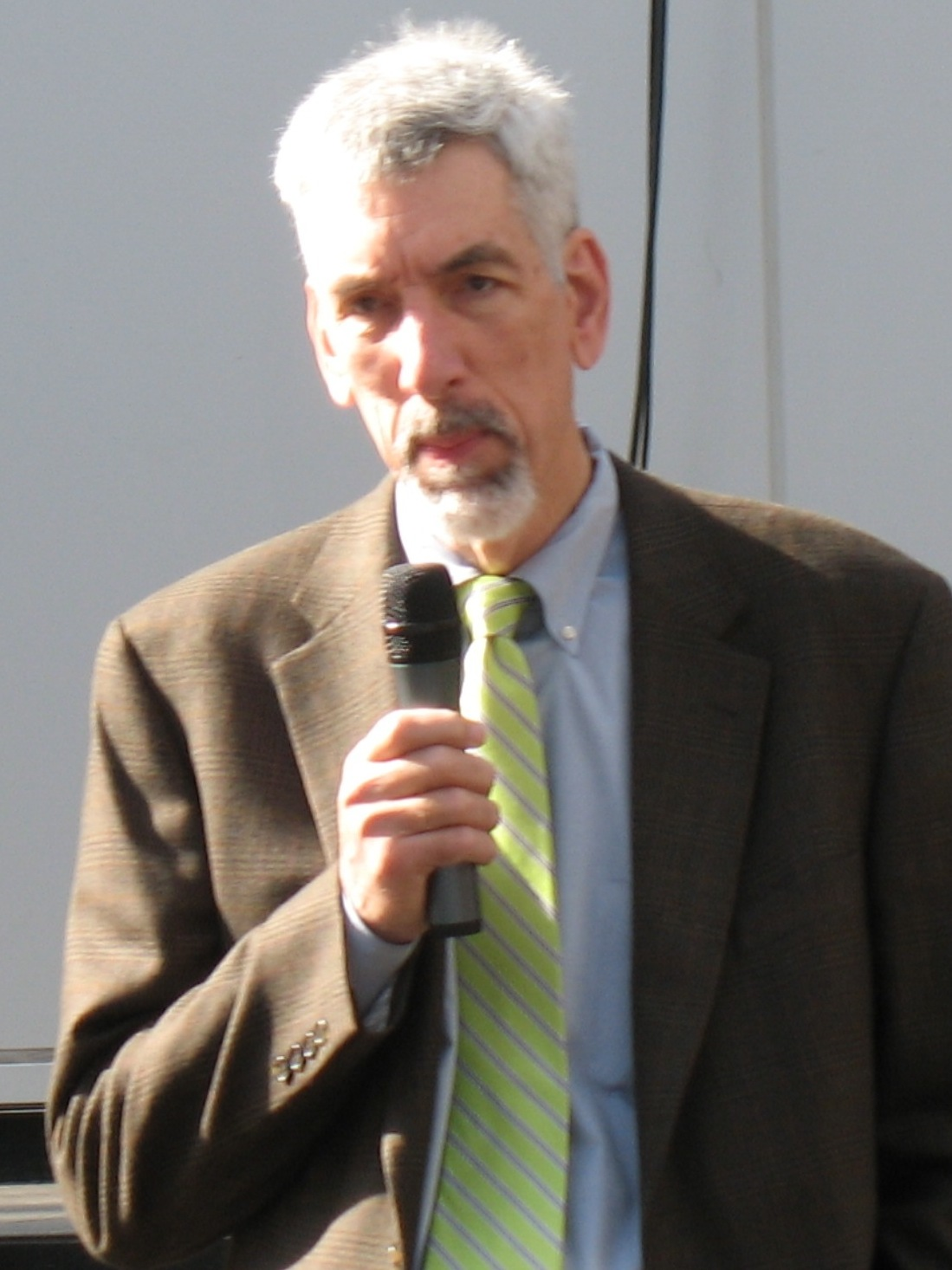

Candidate	Mark Funkhouser	Alvin Brooks
Party	nonpartisan candidate	nonpartisan candidate
Popular vote	35,964	27,027
Percentage	57.01%	42.84%
Mayor before election
Kay Barnes
Democratic
Elected mayor
Mark Funkhouser
Democratic

The 2007 Kansas City mayoral election was held March 2 and April 4, 2007, to elect the mayor of Kansas City, Missouri. It saw the election of Mark Funkhouser.

== Results ==
=== Primary ===
First round results
Party	Candidate	Votes	%
Nonpartisan	Alvin Brooks	14,214	32.19
Nonpartisan	Mark Funkhouser	10,489	23.75
Nonpartisan	Albert Riederer	5,573	12.62
Nonpartisan	Becky Nace	3,425	7.76
Nonpartisan	Jim Glover	4,098	9.28
Nonpartisan	Janice S. Ellis	3,522	7.98
Nonpartisan	Chuck Eddy	668	1.51
Nonpartisan	Henry Klein	558	1.26
Nonpartisan	Stanford P. Glazer	506	1.15
Nonpartisan	Katheryn Shields	482	1.09
Nonpartisan	John Fairfield	385	0.87
Nonpartisan	John DiCapo	237	0.54

=== General election ===
General election results
Party	Candidate	Votes	%
Nonpartisan	Mark Funkhouser	35,964	57.01
Nonpartisan	Alvin Brooks	27,027	42.84
