= Senator Callahan =

Senator Callahan may refer to:

- Donald A. Callahan (1876–1951), Idaho State Senate
- Sonny Callahan (born 1932), Alabama State Senate
- Victor Callahan (born 1963), Missouri State Senate
