= 1974 Missouri State Auditor election =

- November 5, 1974
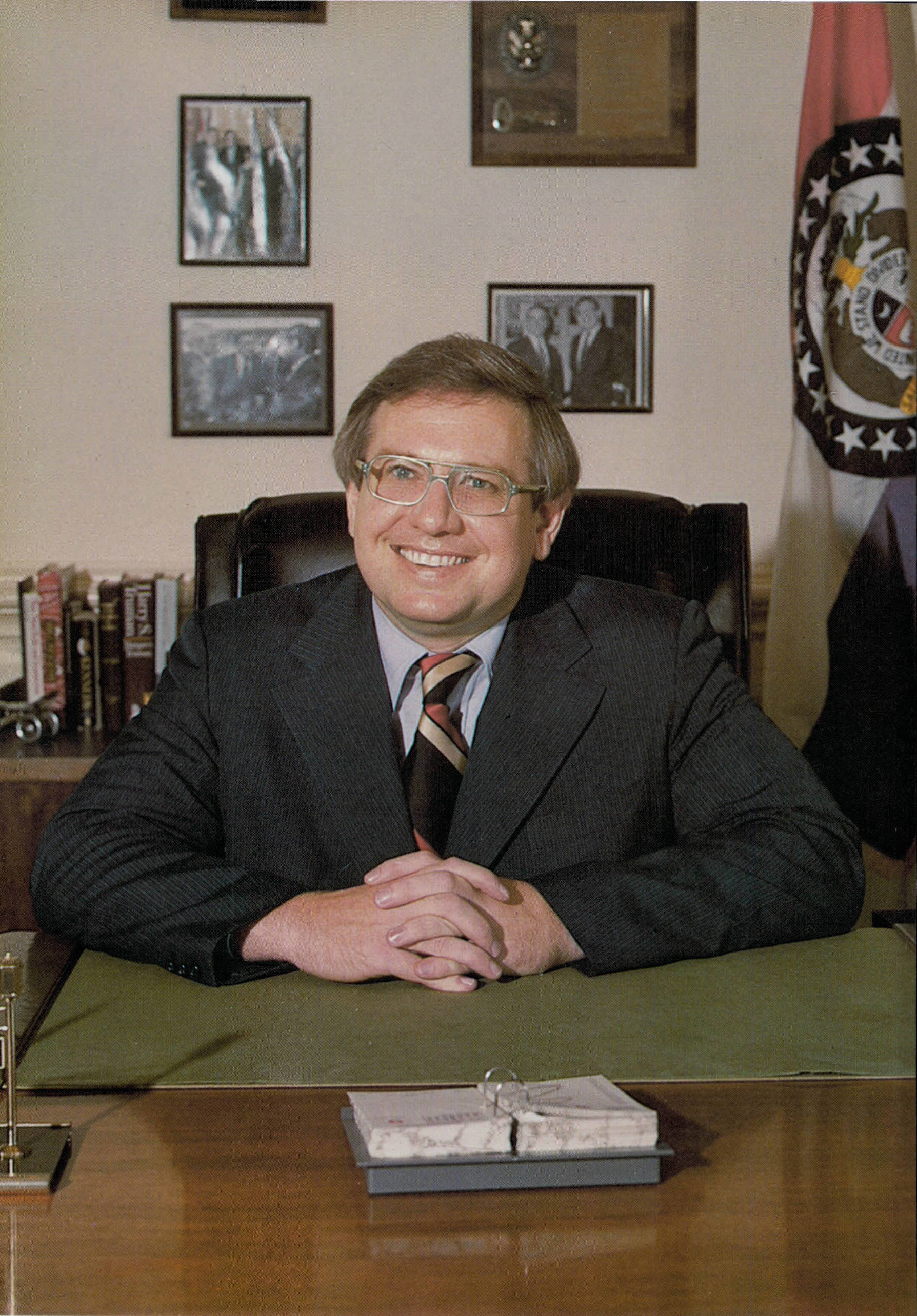

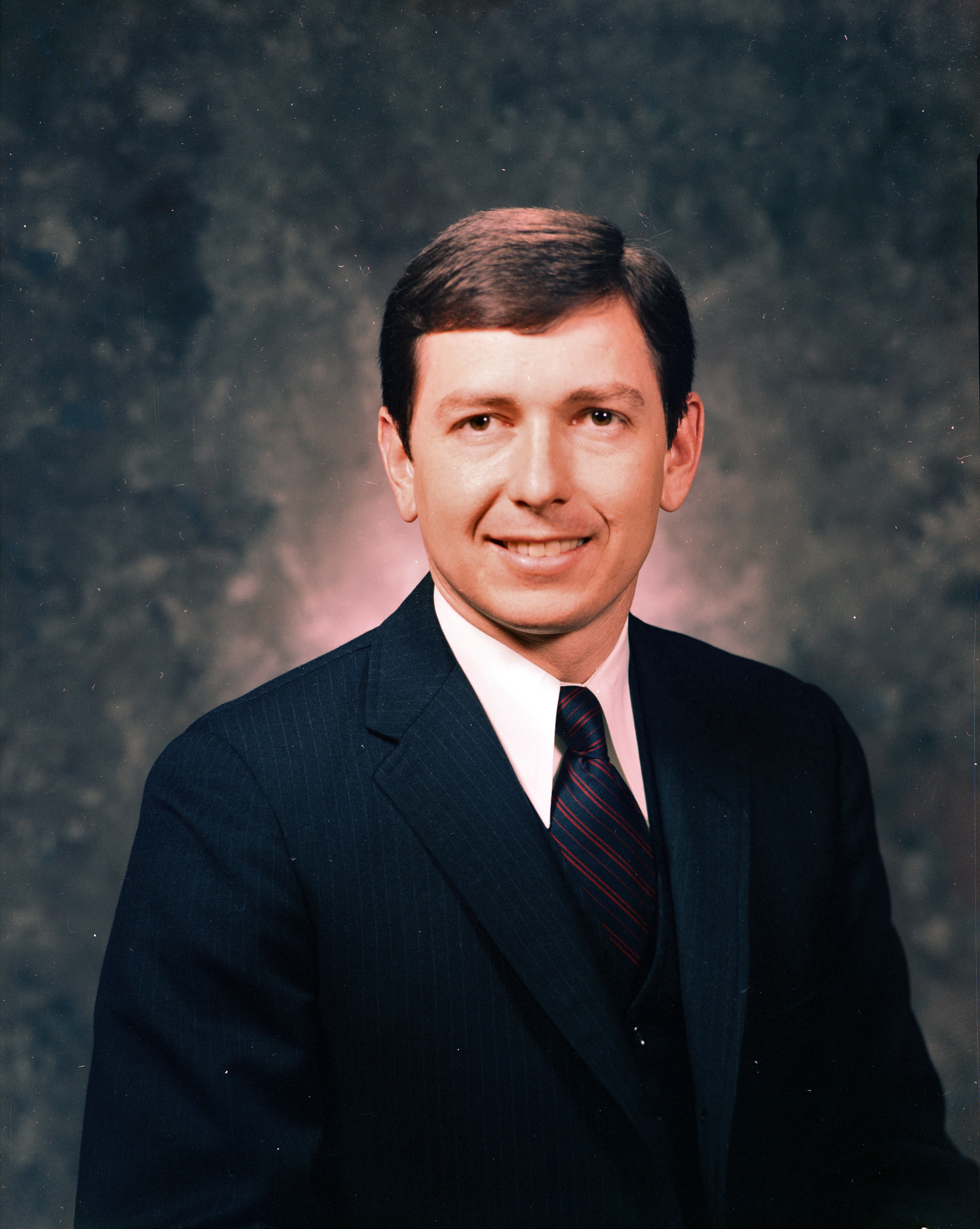
Nominee	George W. Lehr	John Ashcroft
Party	Democratic	Republican
Popular vote	635,855	562,564
Percentage	53.06%	46.94%
State Auditor before election
John Ashcroft (Acting)
Republican
Elected State Auditor
George W. Lehr
Democratic

The 1974 Missouri State Auditor election was held on November 5, 1974, in order to elect the state auditor of Missouri. Democratic nominee George W. Lehr defeated Republican nominee and incumbent acting state auditor John Ashcroft.

== General election ==
On election day, November 5, 1974, Democratic nominee George W. Lehr won the election by a margin of 73,291 votes against his opponent Republican nominee John Ashcroft, thereby gaining Democratic control over the office of state auditor. Lehr was sworn in as the 30th state auditor of Missouri on January 14, 1975.

=== Results ===
Missouri State Auditor election, 1974
Party	Candidate	Votes	%
Democratic	George W. Lehr	635,855	53.06
Republican	John Ashcroft (incumbent)	562,564	46.94
Total votes		1,198,419	100.00
Democratic gain from Republican			
