= 2018 Jackson County Executive election =

- November 6, 2018

Nominee	Frank White	Nathan Kline
Party	Democratic	Green
Popular vote	182,721	50,813
Percentage	77.30%	21.50%
County Executive before election
Frank White
Democratic
Elected County Executive
Frank White
Democratic

The 2018 Jackson Executive election took place on November 6, 2018. County Executive Frank White, who was appointed in 2016 upon the resignation of former County Executive Mike Sanders, and elected in a special election later that year to serve out the remaining two years of Sanders's term, ran for re-election. White faced controversy as he sought a second term, including personal financial difficulties and mismanagement of the county detention center. White won the Democratic primary with 68 percent of the vote and faced only Green Party nominee Nathan Kline in the general election. White defeated Kline by a wide margin, winning re-election with 77 percent of the vote.

== Democratic primary ==
=== Candidates ===
- Frank White, incumbent County Executive
- Matthew T. Merryman, attorney
- Jeremy Raines

=== Results ===
Democratic primary results
Party	Candidate	Votes	%
Democratic	Frank White (inc.)	55,586	68.43%
Democratic	Matthew T. Merryman	17,133	21.09%
Democratic	Jeremy Raines	8,513	10.48%
Total votes		81,232	100.00%

== Green primary ==
=== Candidates ===
- Nathan Kline
- Richard Charles Tolbert, perennial candidate

=== Results ===
Green primary results
Party	Candidate	Votes	%
Green	Richard Charles Tolbert	199	62.78%
Green	Richard Charles Tolbert	118	37.22%
Total votes		317	100.00%

== General election ==
=== Results ===
2018 Jackson County Executive election
Party	Candidate	Votes	%
Democratic	Frank White (inc.)	182,721	77.30%
Green	Nathan Kline	50,813	21.50%
Write-in		2,840	1.20%
Total votes		236,374	100.00%
Democratic hold			
