= 1998 Jackson County Executive election =

- November 3, 1998

Nominee	Katheryn Shields	Reed A. Chambers II
Party	Democratic	Republican
Popular vote	115,389	53,132
Percentage	66.08%	30.43%
County Executive before election
Katheryn Shields
Democratic
Elected County Executive
Katheryn Shields
Democratic

The 1998 Jackson County Executive election took place on November 3, 1998. Incumbent Democratic County Executive Katheryn Shields ran for re-election to a second term. Shields was challenged for renomination by former County Executive Dale Baumgardner, whom she narrowly defeated in the 1994 Democratic primary. However, despite the closeness of her 1994 campaign, Shields defeated Baumgardner in a landslide, winning the Democratic primary with 70 percent of the vote.

In the general election, Shields faced Republican Reed A. Chambers II, a paralegal, and former City Councilman Richard Charles Tolbert, the Reform Party nominee. She defeated both by a wide margin, winning re-election with 66 percent of the vote.

== Democratic primary ==
=== Candidates ===
- Katheryn Shields, incumbent County Executive
- Dale Baumgardner, former County Executive

==== Withdrawn ====
- Jack Hackley, Democratic committeeman

=== Results ===
Democratic primary results
Party	Candidate	Votes	%
Democratic	Katheryn Shields (inc.)	32,347	70.31%
Democratic	Dale Baumgardner	13,657	29.69%
Total votes		46,004	100.00%

== Republican primary ==
=== Candidates ===
- Reed A. Chambers II, paralegal

=== Results ===
Republican primary results
Party	Candidate	Votes	%
Republican	Reed A. Chambers II	14,665	100.00%
Total votes		14,665	100.00%

== Reform primary ==
=== Candidates ===
- Richard Charles Tolbert, former Kansas City Councilman

=== Results ===
Reform primary results
Party	Candidate	Votes	%
Reform	Richard Charles Tolbert	112	100.00%
Total votes		112	100.00%

== General election ==
=== Results ===
1998 Jackson County Executive election
Party	Candidate	Votes	%
Democratic	Katheryn Shields (inc.)	115,389	66.08%
Republican	Reed A. Chambers II	53,132	30.43%
Reform	Richard Charles Tolbert	6,099	3.49%
Total votes		174,620	100.00%
Democratic hold			
