= 2014 Jackson County Executive election =

- November 4, 2014

Nominee	Mike Sanders	Brice Stewart
Party	Democratic	Republican
Popular vote	82,303	48,077
Percentage	60.35%	35.25%
County Executive before election
Mike Sanders
Democratic
Elected County Executive
Mike Sanders
Democratic

The 2014 Jackson Executive election took place on November 4, 2014. Incumbent Democratic County Executive Mike Sanders ran for re-election to a third term. He was challenged by Republican nominee Brice Stewart, a county employee, and Libertarian nominee Richard Tolbert, a former Kansas City Councilman and perennial candidate. Sanders won re-election by a wide margin, receiving 60 percent of the vote to Stewart's 35 percent and Tolbert's 4 percent. Less than a year into his third term, Sanders resigned, citing a desire to spend more time with his family, triggering a 2016 special election.

== Democratic primary ==
=== Candidates ===
- Mike Sanders, incumbent County Executive

=== Results ===
Democratic primary results
Party	Candidate	Votes	%
Democratic	Mike Sanders (inc.)	35,223	100.00%
Total votes		35,223	100.00%

== Republican primary ==
=== Candidates ===
- Brice Stewart, county network support technician, part-time police captain

=== Results ===
Republican primary results
Party	Candidate	Votes	%
Republican	Brice Stewart	26,576	100.00%
Total votes		26,576	100.00%

== Libertarian primary ==
=== Candidates ===
- Richard Charles Tolbert, former Kansas City Councilman, perennial candidate

=== Results ===
Libertarian primary results
Party	Candidate	Votes	%
Libertarian	Richard Charles Tolbert	827	100.00%
Total votes		827	100.00%

== General election ==
=== Results ===
2014 Jackson County Executive election
Party	Candidate	Votes	%
Democratic	Mike Sanders (inc.)	82,303	60.35%
Republican	Brice Stewart	48,077	35.25%
Libertarian	Richard Charles Tolbert	5,945	4.36%
Write-in		52	0.04%
Total votes		136,377	100.00%
Democratic hold			
