= John Rizzo (politician) =

American politician (born 1980)

Minority Leader of the Missouri Senate
- In office January 6, 2021 – June 30, 2024
- Preceded by: Gina Walsh
- Succeeded by: Doug Beck

Member of the Missouri Senate from the 11th district
- In office January 4, 2017 – June 30, 2024
- Preceded by: Paul LeVota
- Succeeded by: Joe Nicola

Member of the Missouri House of Representatives
- In office January 9, 2013 – January 4, 2017
- Preceded by: Ed Schieffer
- Succeeded by: Ingrid Burnett
- Constituency: 19th district
- In office January 5, 2011 – January 9, 2013
- Preceded by: John Burnett
- Succeeded by: Jim Hansen
- Constituency: 40th district

Personal details
- Born: John Joseph Rizzo; October 3, 1980 (age 45) Kansas City, Missouri, U.S.
- Party: Democratic
- Spouse: Lindsay
- Children: 2
- Education: Rockhurst University (BA, BS)
- Website: Campaign website

John Joseph Rizzo (born October 3, 1980) is an American politician who served as a Democratic member of the Missouri Senate from 2017 to 2024. In 2020, Rizzo was elected by his colleagues to serve as Minority Leader. Prior to his election into the Senate, Rizzo was a member of the Missouri House of Representatives, serving the 19th and 40th districts from 2011 to 2017. In the House, Rizzo also served as Democratic Minority Whip.

== Early life, education and career ==
Rizzo was born in Kansas City, Missouri, on October 3, 1980, to Henry and Silvia Rizzo. His father was a Missouri State Representative from 1985 until 2002 and in recent years served as chairman of the Jackson County legislature. His mother, like her husband and son, was also a Jackson County legislator. He has one older brother, Tony, who works for the Kansas City Police Department.

Rizzo went on to earn his BA in English and BS in political science from Rockhurst University in his hometown. At Rockhurst, Rizzo was on the board of directors of Old Northeast, Inc., a non-profit that worked to restore homes in the Old Northeast neighborhood of Kansas City. He also became a Jackson County Committeeman as a Young Democrat, serving Ward 11.

Upon his graduation, he was appointed to the board of directors at Truman Medical Centers, serving on the fiscal responsibility committee there until his election to the Missouri House of Representatives in 2011.

== Missouri state legislature ==
Rizzo is an opponent of Missouri's new "right-to-work" legislation arguing, "When you look at dollars and cents, I was told in politics years ago, when it's not about the money, it's about the money. I think we all know obviously what it's about. It's about lower wages.

Rizzo has voted against setting a higher bar for discrimination lawsuits, tightening restrictions on lifetime government benefits and unemployment benefits as well as implementing voter identification laws. He has voted for an increase in the sales tax and against any cuts in income or corporate tax rates. His record indicates a pro-choice stance and support for an expansion of insurance coverage.

Rizzo resigned from the Missouri Senate in June 2024 in order to take a position as executive director of the Jackson County Sports Authority.

== Controversy ==
After all the votes were tallied in the highly competitive House District 40 race in 2010, Rizzo led fellow Democrat Will Royster by 6 votes (650-644). After an automatic recount was triggered, Rizzo held on to his lead by a single vote, which led Royster to take his case to the Jackson County circuit court over several alleged voting irregularities. Although Kansas City election officials confirmed more than 24 voting discrepancies, Rizzo prevailed.

The Missouri Court of Appeals heard the case but expressed concern that there wasn't enough time for a new primary election. The court ultimately denied Royster's appeal before new evidence was brought forth including three voters who had admitted on camera to KCTV to using a false address in the district in order to vote there.

Three years later, Rizzo's aunt and uncle pleaded guilty to charges filed by Jackson County Prosecutor Jean Peters Baker of illegally voting in 2010, though Rizzo denied any knowledge of the illegal act. The pair was fined and are barred from voting in Missouri for life.

== Electoral history ==
Missouri's 40th House District election, 2006
Primary election
| Party | Candidate | Votes | % |
|---|---|---|---|
| Democratic | John P. Burnett | 841 | 48.7 |
| Democratic | John Joseph Rizzo | 834 | 48.3 |
| Democratic | Christopher Hanf | 51 | 3.0 |

Missouri's 40th House District election, 2008
Primary election
| Party | Candidate | Votes | % |
|---|---|---|---|
| Democratic | John P. Burnett | 1,000 | 59.0 |
| Democratic | John Joseph Rizzo | 694 | 41.0 |

Missouri's 40th House District election, 2010
Primary election
| Party | Candidate | Votes | % |
|---|---|---|---|
| Democratic | John Joseph Rizzo | 664 | 50.0 |
| Democratic | Will Royster | 663 | 50.0 |
General election
| Democratic | John Joseph Rizzo | 2,373 | 66.7 |
| Libertarian | Sean O'Toole | 1,187 | 33.3 |

Missouri's 19th House District election, 2012
Primary election
| Party | Candidate | Votes | % |
|---|---|---|---|
| Democratic | John Joseph Rizzo | 870 | 100.0 |
General election
| Democratic | John Joseph Rizzo | 6,570 | 100.0 |

Missouri's 19th House District election, 2014
Primary election
| Party | Candidate | Votes | % |
|---|---|---|---|
| Democratic | John Joseph Rizzo | 995 | 100.0 |
General election
| Democratic | John Joseph Rizzo | 2,115 | 100.0 |

Missouri's 11th Senate District election, 2016
Primary election
| Party | Candidate | Votes | % |
|---|---|---|---|
| Democratic | John Joseph Rizzo | 4,571 | 46.2 |
| Democratic | Jessica Podhola | 3,750 | 37.9 |
| Democratic | Anthony Banks | 718 | 7.3 |
| Democratic | Mary Catherine DiCarlo | 862 | 8.7 |
General election
| Democratic | John Joseph Rizzo | 33,071 | 52.2 |
| Republican | Brent Thurston Lasater | 30,318 | 47.8 |

Missouri's 11th Senate District election, 2020
Primary election
| Party | Candidate | Votes | % |
|---|---|---|---|
| Democratic | John Joseph Rizzo | 12,012 | 100.0 |
General election
| Democratic | John Joseph Rizzo | 50,065 | 100.0 |

Missouri Senate
| Preceded by Gina Walsh | Minority Leader of the Missouri Senate; 2021–2024 | Succeeded by Doug Beck |
