= 2010 Jackson County Executive election =

- November 2, 2010

Nominee	Mike Sanders	Robert A. Stringfield
Party	Democratic	Republican
Popular vote	127,082	66,468
Percentage	63.70%	33.32%
County Executive before election
Mike Sanders
Democratic
Elected County Executive
Mike Sanders
Democratic

The 2010 Jackson Executive election took place on November 2, 2010. Incumbent Democratic County Executive Mike Sanders contemplated running for Mayor of Kansas City in 2011, but ultimately decided to run for re-election to a second term. He was unopposed in the Democratic primary, and faced former County Legislator Robert Stringfield, the Republican nominee, and retiree Junior Tolbert, the Reform Party nominee, in the general election. Sanders, a "popular incumbent," significantly outraged his opponents, and won the endorsement of the Kansas City Star, and won his second term in a landslide, receiving 64 percent of the vote.

== Democratic primary ==
=== Candidates ===
- Mike Sanders, incumbent County Executive

=== Results ===
Democratic primary results
Party	Candidate	Votes	%
Democratic	Mike Sanders (inc.)	35,223	100.00%
Total votes		35,223	100.00%

== Republican primary ==
=== Candidates ===
- Robert A. Stringfield, former County Legislator

=== Results ===
Republican primary results
Party	Candidate	Votes	%
Republican	Robert A. Stringfield	28,400	100.00%
Total votes		28,400	100.00%

== Reform primary ==
=== Candidates ===
- Ellsworth Tolbert, Jr., retiree

=== Results ===
Reform primary results
Party	Candidate	Votes	%
Reform	Ellsworth Tolbert, Jr.	43	100.00%
Total votes		43	100.00%

== General election ==
=== Results ===
2010 Jackson County Executive election
Party	Candidate	Votes	%
Democratic	Mike Sanders (inc.)	127,082	63.70%
Republican	Robert A. Stringfield	66,468	33.32%
Reform	Ellsworth Tolbert, Jr.	5,937	2.98%
Total votes		199,487	100.00%
Democratic hold			
