= John Burnett (Missouri politician) =

American politician

John Patrick Burnett

Member of the Missouri House of Representatives from the 40th district
- In office 2003–2011
- Succeeded by: John Rizzo

Personal details
- Party: Democratic
- Spouse: Ingrid Burnett
- Children: 3

John Patrick Burnett is an American politician. He was member of the Missouri House of Representatives for the 40th district.

In 2018, Burnett ran for the Jackson County Legislature.

== Personal life ==
Burnett is married to Ingrid Burnett, who served in the Missouri House of Representatives from 2017 to 2025. They have three children.
