= Kay Barnes =

Former Kansas City, Missouri mayor (born 1938)

- Barnes in 2007

Acting Jackson County Executive
- In office October 8, 2025 – October 16, 2025
- Preceded by: Frank White
- Succeeded by: Phil LeVota (interim)

52nd Mayor of Kansas City
- In office April 10, 1999 – May 1, 2007
- Preceded by: Emanuel Cleaver
- Succeeded by: Mark Funkhouser

Personal details
- Born: Beverly Kay Cronkite; March 30, 1938 (age 88) St. Joseph, Missouri, U.S.
- Party: Democratic
- Spouse: Frank Barnes
- Education: University of Kansas, University of Missouri–Kansas City
- Occupation: Senior Director for University Engagement at Park University

Kay Waldo Barnes (born March 30, 1938) is an American politician who served as Mayor of Kansas City, Missouri from 1999 to 2007. She was the first woman to be elected to the office and was elected in 1999 and re-elected in 2003.

She was the Democratic nominee for Missouri's 6th congressional district of the United States House of Representatives in 2008, but lost to incumbent Republican Congressman Sam Graves in a landslide.

In 2025, following the recall of Jackson County Executive Frank White, Barnes was appointed by Jackson County Legislature Chair DaRon McGee as the acting County Executive, effective October 8, 2025, and served until an interim County Executive was selected to serve out the remainder of White's term on October 16.

== Biography ==
Born Beverly Kay Cronkite in St. Joseph, Missouri, she was the daughter of Frederick Pierce "Fritz" Cronkite Jr. (1911-1962) and Helen F. [Morford] Cronkite St. John (1912-2016). Her father was the younger brother of Walter L. Cronkite, making her a niece of famous journalist Walter Cronkite.

She earned a bachelor's degree in secondary education from the University of Kansas, where she was a member of Kappa Kappa Gamma sorority, a master's in secondary education, and a Master of Public Administration degree from the University of Missouri–Kansas City. She was president of Kay Waldo, Inc., a human resources development firm, until her retirement.

== Career ==
In 1974, she was one of the first two women in the Jackson County Legislature. She was elected to the Kansas City council in 1979.

Barnes was the first female mayor of Kansas City. Mayor Barnes has received the most credit for her work in improving Downtown Kansas City and working for beginning the revitalization of the urban core. She is also credited with the Sprint Center arena in Kansas City that opened on October 10, 2007. She was first elected mayor on her birthday in 1999, and re-elected for a second term in 2003. She was succeeded as mayor of Kansas City on May 1, 2007, when Mark Funkhouser took office.

At Missouri Democratic functions, beginning in April, 2007, Mayor Barnes made it clear that she was seriously considering a run for Congress in 2008, and on May 14, 2007, she officially announced her candidacy.for Missouri's 6th congressional district, held by four-term Republican Sam Graves. She had spent most of her life in the district; she lives in the 6th's portion of Kansas City, and grew up in St. Joseph, the largest city entirely in the 6th.

On August 5, 2008, Barnes won against Ali Allon Sherkat in the Democratic primary with 84.5% of the vote. Although the race was initially thought to be competitive, Barnes was soundly defeated, taking only 37 percent of the vote. She even lost the district's share of Kansas City.

Soon after completing her second term as Kansas City's mayor, Barnes joined Park University as the director of the Center for Leadership in May 2007. From 2008 until her retirement on July 31, 2024, Barnes served the University as senior director for university engagement, representing Park within the Greater Kansas City community and as a staff liaison to Park's Civic Advisory Council, a group of Kansas City business, civic and nonprofit leaders.

Barnes is a Fellow of the National Academy of Public Administration.

== Personal life ==
On February 6, 1960 in St. Joseph, she married Douglas Byers Waldo Jr. (1937-2021), kin of the large North American Waldo family, descendant of John Alden, and distant cousin of United States Presidents John Adams and John Quincy Adams. They had two children: Frederick Douglas "Fritz" Waldo and Kelly Kay Waldo. They would divorce some time before 1973, when Douglas remarried.

She married secondly Frank Merritt Barnes (1925-2000) on December 6, 1988 in Kansas City. He died after 11 years of marriage.

She married for a third time to Thomas Van Dyke (b. 1938) on May 30, 2015 in Kansas City.

She is a cousin of United States Presidents George H. W. Bush and George W. Bush through the Pierce family, her great-grandmother being a Pierce at birth.

== See also ==
- 2008 United States House of Representatives elections in Missouri#District 6

Political offices
Preceded by Emanuel Cleaver	Mayors of Kansas City, Missouri; 1999-2007	Succeeded by Mark Funkhouser
