= Wick Thomas =

American politician

Member of the Missouri House of Representatives from the 19th district
- Incumbent
- Assumed office January 8, 2025
- Preceded by: Ingrid Burnett

Personal details
- Party: Democratic
- Spouse: Clay Jarratt
- Education: University of Missouri-Kansas City (B.A.); Emporia State University (M.L.S.)
- Occupation: Legislator; Librarian

Wick Thomas is an American politician from Kansas City, Missouri. They were elected to represent District 19 in the Missouri House of Representatives on November 5, 2024, and assumed office on January 8, 2025. A member of the Democratic Party, they are the first openly transgender or non-binary state legislator in Missouri.

== Early life ==
Thomas is originally from Drexel, Missouri, where they say they experienced bullying in high school. They moved to Kansas City after being homeless as a teenager. They attended the University of Missouri-Kansas City, receiving a B.A. in communications, before getting their M.L.S. from Emporia State University.

They worked at Kansas City Public Library, Nelson-Atkins Museum of Art, and Metropolitan Community College prior to taking political office.

== Political career ==
Thomas began their political career in 2020 by running against incumbent Ingrid Burnett to represent District 19 in the Missouri House of Representatives. They ultimately lost in the democratic primaries. They unsuccessfully attempted to run against Burnett again in 2022.

After Burnett's retirement, Thomas ran for office in 2024 against Democrat Patricia Hernandez and Republican Karen Spalding. Thomas won the election on November 5, 2024, making them the first openly transgender person elected to a state-level office in Missouri.

In 2025, Republican members of the Missouri Legislature introduced bills to put permanent restrictions on access to sports and gender-affirming care by transgender youth. Thomas, whose initial legislative priorities focused on education, libraries and the arts, made news when they spoke in opposition to the bill.

== Electoral history ==
Missouri House of Representatives Primary Election, August 4, 2020, District 19
Party	Candidate	Votes	%	±%
Democratic	Ingrid Burnett	892	40.27%	−10.34
Democratic	Phyllis Harwick	779	35.17%	n/a
Democratic	Nicholas (Wick) Thomas	544	24.56%	n/a
Total votes		2,215	100.00%	

Missouri House of Representatives Primary Election, August 2, 2022, District 19
Party	Candidate	Votes	%	±%
Democratic	Ingrid Burnett	1,146	58.53%	+18.26
Democratic	Wick Thomas	812	41.47%	+16.91
Total votes		1,958	100.00%	

Missouri House of Representatives Primary Election, August 6, 2024, District 19
Party	Candidate	Votes	%	±%
Democratic	Wick Thomas	951	50.06%	+8.59
Democratic	Patricia Ann Geronima Hernandez	930	49.94%	n/a
Total votes		1,881	100.00%	

Missouri House of Representatives Election, November 5, 2024, District 19
Party	Candidate	Votes	%	±%
Democratic	Wick Thomas	6,180	74.51	n/a
Republican	Karen I Spalding	2,114	25.49	+3.83
Total votes		8,294	100.00%	

== Personal life ==
Thomas is non-binary and uses they/them pronouns. They live in Kansas City with their spouse Clay. The couple run a small art business, with Clay making pots and Wick making candles.

== See also ==
- List of transgender public officeholders in the United States
