= 2003 Kansas City mayoral election =

Kansas City mayoral election, 2003
- February 25, 2003 (primary); March 31, 2003 (general)
- Turnout: 9.62% (primary); 18.51% (general)

Candidate	Kay Barnes	Stanford P. Glazer
Party	nonpartisan candidate	nonpartisan candidate
Popular vote	22,990	15,589
Percentage	59.59%	40.41%
Mayor before election
Kay Barnes
Democratic
Elected mayor
Kay Barnes
Democratic

The 2003 Kansas City mayoral election was held February 25 and March 31, 2003 to elect the mayor of Kansas City, Missouri. It saw the reelection of incumbent mayor Kay Barnes.

== Results ==
=== Primary ===
First round results
Party	Candidate	Votes	%
Nonpartisan	Kay Barnes (incumbent)	9,276	46.94
Nonpartisan	Stanford P. Glazer	6,458	32.68
Nonpartisan	Mary M. DeShon	2,195	11.11
Nonpartisan	Anne Wedow	1,831	9.27
Total votes		19,760	

=== General election ===
General election results
Party	Candidate	Votes	%
Nonpartisan	Kay Barnes (incumbent)	22,990	59.59
Nonpartisan	Stanford P. Glazer	15,589	40.41
Total votes		38,579	
