= Paul LeVota =

American politician

Member of the Missouri Senate from the 11th district
- In office January 7, 2013 – August 23, 2015
- Preceded by: Victor Callahan
- Succeeded by: John Rizzo

Personal details
- Born: March 22, 1968 (age 58) Kansas City, Missouri
- Party: Democratic Party
- Spouse: Nancy
- Education: Central Missouri State University, Baker University
- Occupation: Small Businessman, Consulting

Paul LeVota was an American politician who served as the State Senator from Missouri's 11th District. This district includes Independence, Sugar Creek, parts of East Kansas City, Buckner, and unincorporated Jackson County. On July 25, 2015 LeVota resigned from the Missouri Senate effective August 23, 2015 over multiple allegations of sexual harassment made by his current and former interns.

== Biography ==
LeVota attended Truman High School in Independence, Missouri, where he served as student body president. He then received a bachelor's degree in speech communications and political science from Central Missouri State University (CMSU). LeVota was a member of Sigma Phi Epsilon fraternity and student body vice president. Later, he received a Master of Science in management from Baker University.

Before being elected to the Missouri General Assembly, LeVota worked for Sprint Corporation in training and development.

== Legislative career ==
LeVota served in the Missouri House of Representatives for eight years. In 2007, he was elected by his peers as House Democratic Leader. LeVota was awarded the "Best New Legislator of the Year" by the Show Me Council for Responsibility and Accountability in Government. He has also received "The Hero for Healthcare Award" from the AFT Healthcare Midwest, and was named the "Defender of Patient's Safety" from Missouri Watch Coalition. In 2006, he was named a "Champion of Justice" from the Missouri Association of Trial Attorneys. He was also awarded the Horace Mann Friend of Education Award by the Missouri NEA in 2007.

In 2008, LeVota was awarded the Missouri Homebuilders Association's Legislator of the Year, the MS Society Legislator of the Years, and an honor "Doctor of Bio Science" from The Missouri Biotechnology Association. LeVota also received the 2008 James C. Kirkpatrick Excellence in Governance Award from the University of Central Missouri, along with The St. Louis Business Journal 2008 Legislative Award.

LeVota received recognition in 2010 from the Missouri Association of Sheltered Workshop Managers for his service to people with disabilities and from the Partnership for Children for his dedication to the betterment of children in Missouri. LeVota has also received distinction as a national delegate to the American Council of Young Political Leaders exchange program with the People's Republic of China.

== Controversy ==
A female student legislative intern filed a Title IX civil rights complaint, making allegations of sexual harassment against him. The student claimed LeVota had pressured her for sex and her refusal led to a hostile working environment. Shortly after going public, another student intern came forward publicly alleging the senator had invited her over to his duplex with photographs of inappropriate text messages she had received from the senator nearly 5 years earlier.

After an investigation concluded the accusations were more credible than LeVota's denial, LeVota resigned from the state senate, effective August 23, 2015. Missouri Governor Jay Nixon, a Democrat, Missouri Democratic Party Chairman Roy Temple, and Democratic Senator Claire McCaskill strongly supported LeVota's departure.

LeVota is currently working as a small businessman in consulting.

== Personal ==
LeVota is a lifelong resident of Independence, Missouri. He has been married to his wife Nancy since 1992. The couple has two daughters, Meghan and Madeline. His brother, Phil, served as Jackson County, Missouri Executive, appointed in 2025 and served until 2026.

LeVota belongs to Saint Mark's Catholic Church in Independence, where he is a member of the Knights of Columbus, Third Degree. He is a member of Independence Mason Lodge 76 and the Ararat Shrine. He belongs to the Tomasha Home Owner's Association and the Independence PTA. He is an avid reader and an outdoor sportsman.
