= Frank White (baseball) =

American politician and former baseball player (born 1950)

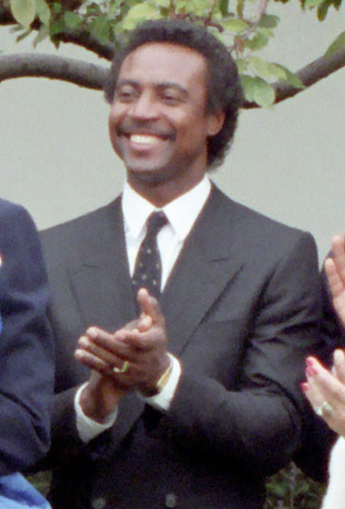
- White in 1985
- Second baseman
- Born: September 4, 1950 (age 76); Greenville, Mississippi, U.S.
- Batted: Right Threw: Right

MLB debut
- June 12, 1973, for the Kansas City Royals

Last MLB appearance
- September 30, 1990, for the Kansas City Royals

MLB statistics
- Batting average: .255
- Hits: 2,006
- Home runs: 160
- Runs batted in: 886
- Stats at Baseball Reference

Teams
- Kansas City Royals (1973–1990)

Career highlights and awards
- 5× All-Star (1978, 1979, 1981, 1982, 1986); World Series champion (1985); ALCS MVP (1980); 8× Gold Glove Award (1977–1982, 1986, 1987); Silver Slugger Award (1986); Kansas City Royals No. 20 retired; Kansas City Royals Hall of Fame
County executive of Jackson County, Missouri
In office January 11, 2016 – October 8, 2025
| Preceded by | Mike Sanders; Fred Arbanas (acting) |
| Succeeded by | Kay Barnes (acting) |
Personal details
| Party | Democratic |
| Education | Longview Community College |

Frank White Jr. (born September 4, 1950) is an American politician and former professional baseball player, coach, and television sports commentator who is currently the first base coach for the Kansas City Monarchs of the American Association of Professional Baseball. He played his entire eighteen-year career in Major League Baseball as a second baseman for the Kansas City Royals from 1973 to 1990 and was an integral member of the 1985 World Series winning team.

A five-time All-Star player, White was considered one of the best defensive second basemen of his era, winning eight Gold Glove Awards between 1977 and 1987. He was the first American League (AL) second baseman to win the award eight times. Although he was recognized more for his solid defensive play, he posted a .545 batting average during the 1980 American League Championship Series to be named the Most Valuable Player of the series. White also won the Silver Slugger Award at second base in 1986. A two-time Royals Player of the Year Award winner, in 1995 his uniform number 20 was retired and he was inducted into the Kansas City Royals Hall of Fame.

After his playing career, he has worked as a professional baseball coach and television color commentator. In 2016, he was appointed as the County Executive of Jackson County, Missouri, after the resignation of Mike Sanders. He was elected to serve out the remainder of Sanders' term in a 2016 special election, and was re-elected in 2018 and 2022. In 2025, White was recalled from office.

== Early years ==
White was born in Greenville, Mississippi. After attending Longview Community College in Lee's Summit, Missouri, he rose through Minor League Baseball to reach the big leagues. Within the Royals' farm system, he played for the rookie league Gulf Coast League Royals (1971), Class A San Jose Bees (1972), Class AA Jacksonville Suns (1972), and Class AAA Omaha Royals (1973).

== Playing career ==
White is one of only three MLB players, along with Ron Washington and U L Washington, who were products of the Royals Academy. Though initially disliked by Kansas City fans because he displaced the popular Cookie Rojas at second base, he went on to set a major-league record jointly with teammate George Brett, by appearing in 1,914 games together. The record stood until 1995, when it was broken by the Detroit Tigers' Alan Trammell and Lou Whitaker.

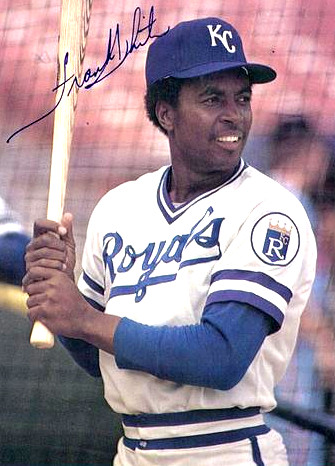
White with the Kansas City Royals in 1980

A smooth fielder, White was a five-time All-Star. He won the Gold Glove Award eight times, including six consecutive seasons from 1977 to 1982. In 1977, he played 62 consecutive errorless games. In 1980, White was awarded the inaugural American League Championship Series MVP award in the 1980 ALCS against the New York Yankees, leading the Royals to their first World Series appearance.

Although in his early years he was a singles hitter who contributed little to the Royals' run column, White improved markedly as an offensive player during his career, hitting 22 home runs two years in a row, in 1985 and 1986. Since the 1985 World Series was played without the designated hitter, White hit cleanup during that series, in place of Hal McRae. Until White, the only other second baseman to hit cleanup in a World Series was Jackie Robinson. In the 1986 Major League Baseball All-Star Game, his solo home run in the seventh off Mike Scott was the deciding run in a 3–2 American League victory.

White retired as a player in 1990, after 18 seasons with Kansas City, having played 2324 regular season games with a .255 average, 160 home runs and 886 RBIs. Defensively, White posted a .984 fielding percentage at second base and .983 fielding percentage overall. He also hit for the cycle twice in his major league career, on September 26, 1979, in a 4–0 victory over the California Angels and on August 3, 1982, in a 6–5 win over the Detroit Tigers.

== Post-playing career ==
Frank White's number 20 was retired by the Kansas City Royals in 1995.

=== Coaching and front office ===
After the end of White's playing career, he was a first base coach with both the Boston Red Sox from 1994 to 1996, and with the Kansas City Royals from 1997 to 2001, wearing uniform number 20 for both teams. He then managed the Wichita Wranglers for three years before moving to Kansas City's front office. White was mentioned as a possible candidate for Royals' general manager Dayton Moore to consider as the successor to manager Buddy Bell after the 2007 season; the job ultimately went to Trey Hillman. White resigned from his position in the front office in January 2011.

White is currently on the coaching staff of the Kansas City Monarchs in the American Association of Professional Baseball.

=== Broadcasting ===
In February 2008, it was announced that White was joining FSN Kansas City to serve as a part-time color commentator on Royals telecasts (filling in for Paul Splittorff on select games), as well as an analyst on the channel's Royals Live postgame show.

FSN Kansas City announced in early December 2011 that White's broadcasting contract wouldn't be renewed as the Royals' television color commentator.

== Politics ==
White ran for the Jackson County Legislature in 2014 as a Democrat, winning the election of an at-large seat.

On January 11, 2016, White was appointed county executive by the Jackson County Legislature, for the remainder of 2016 following the resignation of Mike Sanders. In November 2016, White was elected to the same position, for a two-year term. He was reelected in 2018 and 2022.

In 2024, White vetoed an ordinance that would have created a ballot measure on renewing a 3/8th-cent sales tax to subsidize sports stadiums for the Kansas City Chiefs and the Kansas City Royals. White argued that providing more than $2 billion of taxpayer money towards stadiums without any guarantee of long-term commitments from the teams would be a bad deal for taxpayers.

White faced a recall election on September 30, 2025. He has also stated that he will not seek re-election in 2026, but left the door open to run for legislature. Voters voted overwhelmingly to remove White from office.

== Honors ==
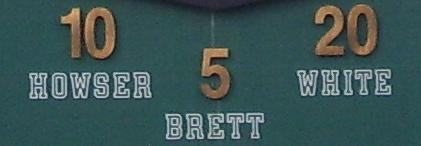
In 1995, White's number 20 was retired alongside George Brett and Dick Howser.

White was inducted into the Missouri Sports Hall of Fame in 1994. On Sunday July 2, 1995, the Royals retired White's number 20, and the same year he was inducted into the Royals' Hall of Fame. A bronze statue of White was dedicated outside of Kauffman Stadium in 2004, joining Royals founders Ewing & Muriel Kauffman, George Brett, and as of 2009, Dick Howser.

== See also ==
- List of American professional sports figures who held elective office
- List of Major League Baseball career hits leaders
- List of Major League Baseball career doubles leaders
- List of Major League Baseball career stolen bases leaders
- List of Major League Baseball players who spent their entire career with one franchise
- List of Major League Baseball players to hit for the cycle

Achievements
| Preceded by Bob Watson; Charlie Moore | Hitting for the cycle September 26, 1979; August 3, 1982 | Succeeded by Iván DeJesús; Cal Ripken Jr. |
Sporting positions
| Preceded by Félix Maldonado | Gulf Coast League Red Sox manager 1992 | Succeeded by Félix Maldonado |
| Preceded by Al Bumbry | Boston Red Sox First-Base Coach; 1994–1996 | Succeeded by Dave Jauss |
