= 2016 Jackson County Executive special election =

- November 8, 2016

Nominee	Frank White	Stacey Lindgren
Party	Democratic	Green
Popular vote	224,055	46,858
Percentage	82.11%	17.17%
County Executive before election
Frank White
Democratic
Elected County Executive
Frank White
Democratic

The 2016 Jackson Executive special election took place on November 8, 2016. County Executive Mike Sanders, who was re-elected to a third term in 2014, resigned from office on December 31, 2015. Former County Legislator Fred Arbanas was briefly appointed to serve as acting County Executive until the County Legislature selected an interim replacement to serve until the special election. On January 11, 2016, County Legislator Frank White, a former Kansas City Royals player, was selected as interim County Executive.

White ran in the special election to serve out the final two years of Sanders's term. He faced no major-party opposition, and his only opponent was Green Party nominee Stacey Lindgreen, a business strategist and marketing consultant. White won the election in a landslide, receiving 81 percent of the vote to Lindgren's 17 percent.

== Democratic primary ==
=== Candidates ===
- Frank White, incumbent County Executive

=== Results ===
Democratic primary results
Party	Candidate	Votes	%
Democratic	Frank White (inc.)	47,127	100.00%
Total votes		47,127	100.00%

== General election ==
=== Candidates ===
- Frank White, incumbent County Executive (Democratic)
- Stacey Lindgreen, business strategist and marketing consultant (Green)

=== Results ===
2016 Jackson County Executive special election
Party	Candidate	Votes	%
Democratic	Frank White (inc.)	224,055	82.11%
Green	Stacey Lindgren	46,858	17.17%
Write-in		1,963	0.72%
Total votes		272,876	100.00%
Democratic hold			
