= Ingrid Burnett =

American politician and educator

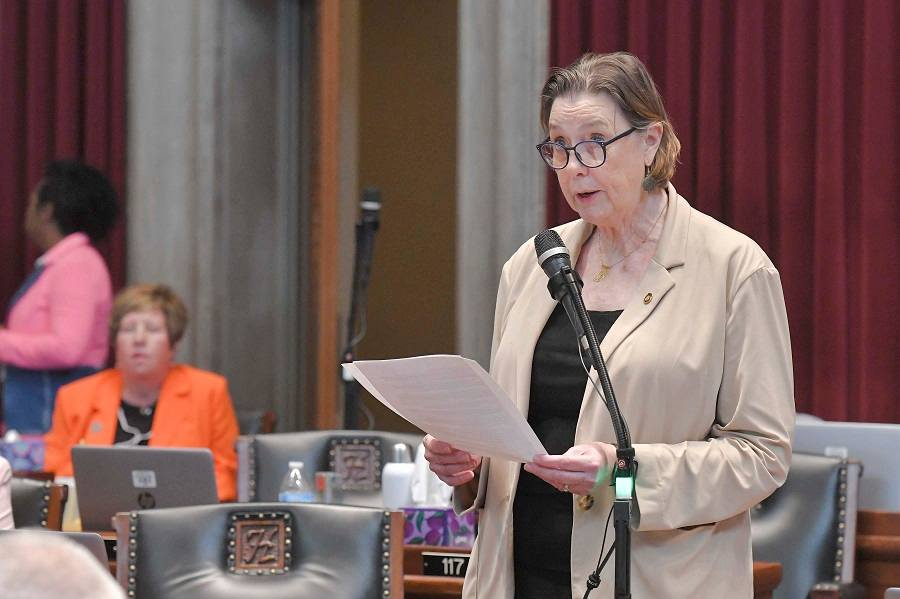
- Rep. Ingrid Burnett

Minority Caucus Chair of the Missouri House of Representatives
- In office 2019–2025
- Leader: Crystal Quade
- Preceded by: Gina Mitten
- Succeeded by: Emily Weber

Member of the Missouri House of Representatives from the 19th district
- In office January 2017 – January 8, 2025
- Preceded by: John Joseph Rizzo
- Succeeded by: Wick Thomas

KCPS Board
- In office 2002–2008

Personal details
- Born: St. Louis, Missouri, U.S.
- Party: Democratic
- Spouse: John Burnett
- Children: 3
- Education: Webster Groves High School (1971); University of Missouri–Kansas City (BA); Avila University (MS)

Ingrid Burnett is an American politician and former educator from Missouri. She was a member of the Kansas City Public Schools (KCPS) Board of Directors from 2002 to 2008, including as vice president. This was during the final resolution of the Missouri v. Jenkins federal desegregation case, a landmark remedy for the district's unconstitutional racial segregation that had made KCPS the first in the nation to be stripped of its accreditation. She later stated she played "a key role in resolving the district's long-running federal desegregation lawsuit". She represented District 19 in the Missouri House of Representatives from 2017 until 2025, serving as House Minority Caucus Chair from 2019 to 2025.

== Early life and education ==
Burnett was born in St. Louis, Missouri. She is a long-time resident of Kansas City's Historic Northeast area. She graduated from Webster Groves High School in 1971. She earned a Bachelor of Arts (BA) in music education and music therapy from the University of Missouri–Kansas City (UMKC) in 1979. In 1998, she earned a Master of Science (MS) in counseling psychology from Avila University.

== Career ==
=== Education and politics ===
Burnett was the principal of Holy Family School in Independence until the school's closure in 1996. After receiving her master's degree, she worked as an elementary counselor in the Independence School District.

In 2002, she joined the Kansas City Public Schools (KCPS) Board of Directors, including as vice president, and left in 2008. Her tenure coincided with the academic and financial fallout from the conclusion of the Missouri v. Jenkins case. In 2000, KCPS had become the first in the nation to lose its accreditation, and regained a provisional status in 2002, the year she joined the board. In this landmark case about the school district's historic loss of state accreditation due to its unconstitutional racial segregation, the major legal rulings were issued by the U.S. Supreme Court in 1995, followed by a final settlement between the state and KCPS in 1997, prior to her tenure on the board. Closure of the case still required the board's complete administrative actions. Her website states she had "a key role in resolving the district's long-running federal desegregation lawsuit".

In 2002, she also became the Jackson County Democratic Committee representative for Ward 11.

=== Missouri House of Representatives ===
Burnett was first elected to the Missouri House of Representatives in 2016 and served until she was term-limited in 2025, serving as the House Minority Caucus Chair from 2019 to 2025. Her legislative work focused on themes from her career in education and on government transparency.

==== Education policy ====
The landmark case made the front page of the Kansas City Star, and its article quoted Burnett: "The ruling validates what teachers are doing. ... That's powerful for teachers."

Burnett's policy positions were informed by her 30-year career as an educator and counselor. She became one of four legislators appointed to the Blue Ribbon Commission on Teacher Recruitment and Retention, defining her motivation to KCUR-FM: "We can't continue to treat our teachers this way ... That was the passion that I came to the commission with, that we would find a way to get support staff in the classroom". She noted that she successfully allocated money for support staff in the previous year's budget, but Governor Mike Parson vetoed it. She argued that low teacher pay was driving educators to neighboring states, telling KCUR that "oftentimes, there's more political advantage to being critical of the public schools than there is to supporting them".

She championed the state's Career Ladder program and its salary supplements: "It allowed me to pay for my kid's braces. I couldn't have done that without the Career Ladder Program." She took public stances on curriculum censorship, and in 2022, was quoted in Mother Jones denouncing a one-sided legislative hearing on critical race theory: "It is the height of irony that a hearing to consider censoring curriculum would censor those who are allowed to speak".

Her work was recognized with several advocacy awards from educational groups. In 2022, she received the Horace Mann Award from the Missouri National Education Association, given to officials who have "worked for the passage of important educational legislation". In 2024, she received the Otto Bean Jr. Award from the Missouri Art Education Association, which honors "elected officials who have significantly advanced the arts and art education in Missouri". In 2024, she received the "Government Advocate Award" from the Missouri Alliance for Arts Education.

==== Legislative stances ====
In 2018, Burnett emerged as a vocal critic of the Eric Greitens administration's use of Confide, a messaging app that destroys messages after they are read. She argued that the practice violated the state's public records Sunshine Law, and told the PBS NewsHour, "We should not be allowed to conduct state business using invisible ink".

In 2024, she opposed a bill to fund the deployment of Missouri State Highway Patrol troopers to the U.S. border in Texas. She argued that the resources were needed locally, telling the press it was "a reckless move to deplete our service people".

In 2024, she cast the single dissenting vote on housing policy, when the House passed a bill (145–1) to prohibit local governments from enacting eviction moratoriums. She explained to KCUR, "We can't anticipate the kinds of disasters that could require some extraordinary circumstance, extraordinary rules".

=== Electoral history ===
Missouri House of Representatives Primary Election, August 2, 2016, District 19
Party	Candidate	Votes	%	±%
Democratic	Ingrid Burnett	787	50.61%	
Democratic	Manny Abarca IV	768	49.39%	
Total votes		1,555	100.00%	

Missouri House of Representatives Election, November 8, 2016, District 19
Party	Candidate	Votes	%	±%
Democratic	Ingrid Burnett	5,479	76.60%	
Green	Valorie Engholm	1,674	23.40%	
Total votes		7,153	100.00%	

Missouri House of Representatives Election, November 6, 2018, District 19
Party	Candidate	Votes	%	±%
Democratic	Ingrid Burnett	4,904	79.35%	+2.75
Green	Valorie Engholm	1,276	20.65%	−2.75
Total votes		6,180	100.00%	

Missouri House of Representatives Primary Election, August 4, 2020, District 19
Party	Candidate	Votes	%	±%
Democratic	Ingrid Burnett	892	40.27%	−10.34
Democratic	Phyllis Harwick	779	35.17%	n/a
Democratic	Nicholas (Wick) Thomas	544	24.56%	n/a
Total votes		2,215	100.00%	

Missouri House of Representatives Election, November 3, 2020, District 19
Party	Candidate	Votes	%	±%
Democratic	Ingrid Burnett	7,026	100.00%	+20.65
Total votes		7,026	100.00%	

Missouri House of Representatives Primary Election, August 2, 2022, District 19
Party	Candidate	Votes	%	±%
Democratic	Ingrid Burnett	1,146	58.53%	+18.26
Democratic	Wick Thomas	812	41.47%	+16.91
Total votes		1,958	100.00%	

Missouri House of Representatives Election, November 8, 2022, District 19
Party	Candidate	Votes	%	±%
Democratic	Ingrid Burnett	4,099	78.34%	−21.66
Republican	Karen I. Spalding	1,133	21.66%	+21.66
Total votes		5,232	100.00%	

== Personal life ==
Burnett is married to John Burnett, who previously served in the Missouri House of Representatives. They have three children.
