= List of county executives of Jackson County, Missouri =

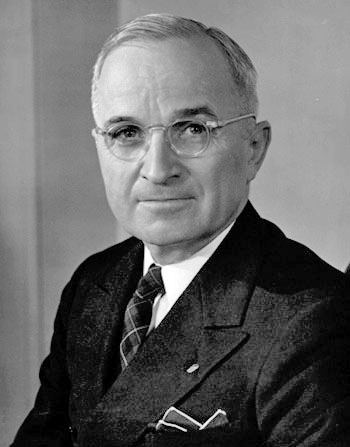
Harry S. Truman, who was a Presiding Judge in 1927

Following is a list of the county executives of Jackson County, Missouri.

== Presiding Judge ==
From 1827 until 1972 Jackson County was headed by a three-member County Commission called a County Court, with a Presiding Judge as the county's chief executive. There was no requirement that a judge be a lawyer, and these "judges" had no judicial authority. The Court reflected the county's divided nature with one judge representing the then-rural eastern areas around the county seat of Independence, while the western judge represented the more urban areas closer to Kansas City. The presiding judge was elected countywide. Courthouses were built in both cities. The most famous presiding judge was Harry S. Truman (later the 33rd U.S. President) who represented the Eastern District before later winning election as presiding judge. The last presiding judge, George W. Lehr, later served as Missouri State Auditor from 1974 until 1977.

- 1827 - Richard Fristoe
- 1834 - Moses G. Wilson
- 1838 - John Davis (county executive)
- 1842 - James B. Yager
- 1846 - Alvin Brooking
- 1850 - Richard D. Stanley
- 1862 - Jacob Leader
- 1865 - M. T. Graham
- 1866 - Andrew G. Newgent
- 1867 - G. W. Gates
- 1869 - James B. Yager
- 1875 - Albert Gallatin Williams
- 1877 - Josiah Collins
- 1879 - James B. Yager
- 1883 - Robert L. Adkins
- 1887 - John A. McDonald
- 1891 - Daniel Murphy
- 1895 - John B. Stone
- 1899 - G.L. Chrisman
- 1907 - J. M. Patterson
- 1911 - H. C. Gilbert
- 1915 - Miles Bulger
- 1923 - Elihu W. Hayes
- 1927 - Harry S. Truman
- 1935 - Eugene I. Purcell
- 1937 - David E. Long
- 1941 - George S. Montgomery
- 1947 - Harry M. Gambrel
- 1951 - Harry M. Fleming
- 1955 - Ray G. Cowan
- 1959 - John J. Kopp
- 1963 - Charles E. Curry
- 1971 - George W. Lehr

== County Executive ==
In 1970 a new county charter approved effective January 1973 replaced the County Court with a stronger County Commission, with representatives elected from 11 districts. The 11 districts were reduced to 6 in 1987. A County Executive serves as presiding officer.

- 1973 - George W. Lehr
- 1975 - Mike White
- 1979 - Dale Baumgardner
- 1983 - William F. Waris
- 1991 - Marsha Murphy
- 1995 - Katheryn Shields
- 2007 - Mike Sanders
- 2016 - Fred Arbanas (Temporary)*
- 2016 - Frank White
- 2025 - Kay Barnes (Temporary)*
- 2025 - Phil LeVota
