= George W. Lehr =

American politician

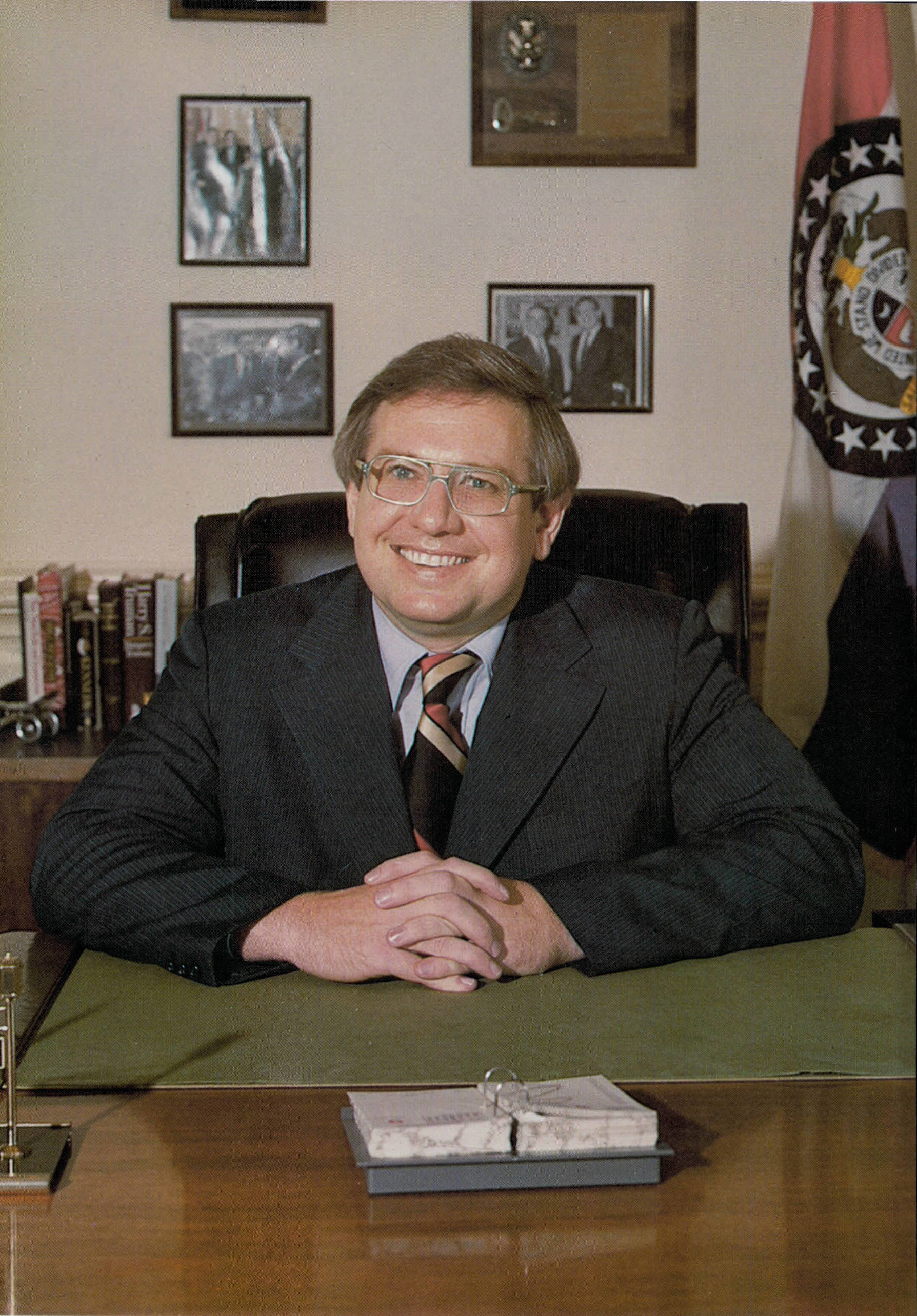
- Official portrait (1975)

30th State Auditor of Missouri
- In office January 14, 1975 – January 11, 1977
- Governor: Kit Bond
- Preceded by: John Ashcroft
- Succeeded by: Thomas M. Keyes

County Executive of Jackson County, Missouri
- In office 1973–1975
- Preceded by: Himself (as Presiding Judge)
- Succeeded by: Mike White

Presiding Judge of Jackson County, Missouri
- In office 1971–1973
- Preceded by: Charles E. Curry
- Succeeded by: Himself (as County Executive)

Personal details
- Born: George Warwick Lehr; March 10, 1937 Kirksville, Missouri, U.S.
- Died: March 21, 1988 (aged 51) Chicago, Illinois, U.S.
- Party: Democratic
- Spouse: Barbara Lehr (1957-1988)
- Children: 3
- Education: University of Iowa
- Profession: Accountant

George Warwick Lehr (March 10, 1937 – March 21, 1988) was an American Democratic politician from Missouri who served as the state auditor from 1975 to 1977. He started his career when in 1963, he was appointed auditor of Jackson County, Missouri. When Jackson County replaced its three-member court, which governed as a commission, with a legislature and county executive, Lehr won the election to become the first county executive. He was elected state auditor in 1974, defeating future U.S. Attorney General John Ashcroft. Lehr resigned in 1977 to spend more time with his family, including his son who had suffered muscular dystrophy. After leaving office, he was credited with helping to clean the Teamster's pension fund. Lehr developed brain tumors and died in 1988.

== Early life and career ==
He was born in Kirksville, Missouri, in 1937. He attended Kirksville High School and was halfback on the football team, where he was coached by John Spainhower, the brother of future Missouri Treasurer Jim Spainhower. In his senior year of high school, Lehr became afflicted with Polio. He would walk with the aid of crutches afterwards.

After graduating from the University of Iowa in 1959 with a Bachelor of Science degree in accounting, he was worked as an accountant for Arthur Young and Company. In 1963, he was appointed auditor of Jackson County, Missouri. At the age of 29, he became the youngest major elected office holder in the history of Jackson County by being elected collector of revenue. He was the first elected county executive, serving from 1971 to 1975, replacing the old system of having a County Judge, and replacing it with a legislature and Executive. During his watch the County built the Truman Sports Complex, and Lehr on one occasion, mediated during a possible strike that threatened the project. Also during his tenure, Lehr once helped diffuse a prison hostage situation by offering himself as a hostage, and remaining so until there was a resolution.

== State Auditor of Missouri ==
In 1974, Lehr was elected Missouri auditor by a margin of about 73,000 votes, defeating the appointed incumbent John Ashcroft. Lehr argued that as a certified public accountant, he would be better able to do the job. He became the first certified public accountant to serve as State Auditor.

Lehr was seen as a potential contender for the Democratic nomination for governor in 1976. Polling at the time showed Lehr to be the best polling candidate against incumbent Governor Kit Bond, albeit trailing by a large margin. Later polls showed that Lehr was the best polling candidate in the Democratic primary, edging out State Treasurer James Spainhower and Jackson County Prosecuting Attorney Joseph Teasdale. Lehr considered running, even before he was elected Auditor, but would ultimately decline to enter the race. There had been speculation that Teasdale's candidacy affected Lehr's plans, though he would deny this.

On September 18, 1976, Lehr announced his intent to resign to spend more time with his family and terminally ill son, George Lehr Jr. who had muscular dystrophy. The day before, Lehr's son had passed out attending a high school football game, and the amount of strain his son's health put on his family influenced Lehr to make the decision. Lehr planned to resign after that November's election if Kit Bond won re-election, but opted to delay his resignation for when Joseph Teasdale won, so that the new Governor, a fellow Democrat, could name his replacement. His resignation went into effect at noon January 11, 1977. He was succeeded by Thomas M. Keyes.

== Post-Auditor career ==
After leaving office, Lehr was named the president of the Empire Bank and Trust Company in Kansas City. Later, he was chairman and chief executive officer of Traders Bank. Lehr's son died on December 8, 1977 at the age of 18. In 1981, Lehr accepted a post as executive director of the Teamsters Union Central States pension fund. He was credited with helping to clean up the scandal-plagued fund. Lehr declined to make a bid for the open 5th congressional district seat in 1981.

== Death ==
On March 5, 1987, Lehr had a seizure on the way to Washington National Airport and was rushed to George Washington University Hospital. Afterwards, he underwent tests, including a brain biopsy. Shortly afterwards, he was sent to the Mayo Clinic, where he was diagnosed with brain tumors. The tumors were considered inoperable. Lehr died on March 21, 1988, at the age of 51. He was survived by his wife Barbara and two daughters.

Party political offices
Preceded by Haskell Holman	Democratic nominee for Auditor of Missouri; 1974	Succeeded by Warren E. Hearnes
Political offices
Preceded by John Ashcroft	Missouri State Auditor; 1974–1977	Succeeded by Thomas M. Keyes
