= Victor Callahan =

American politician (born 1963)

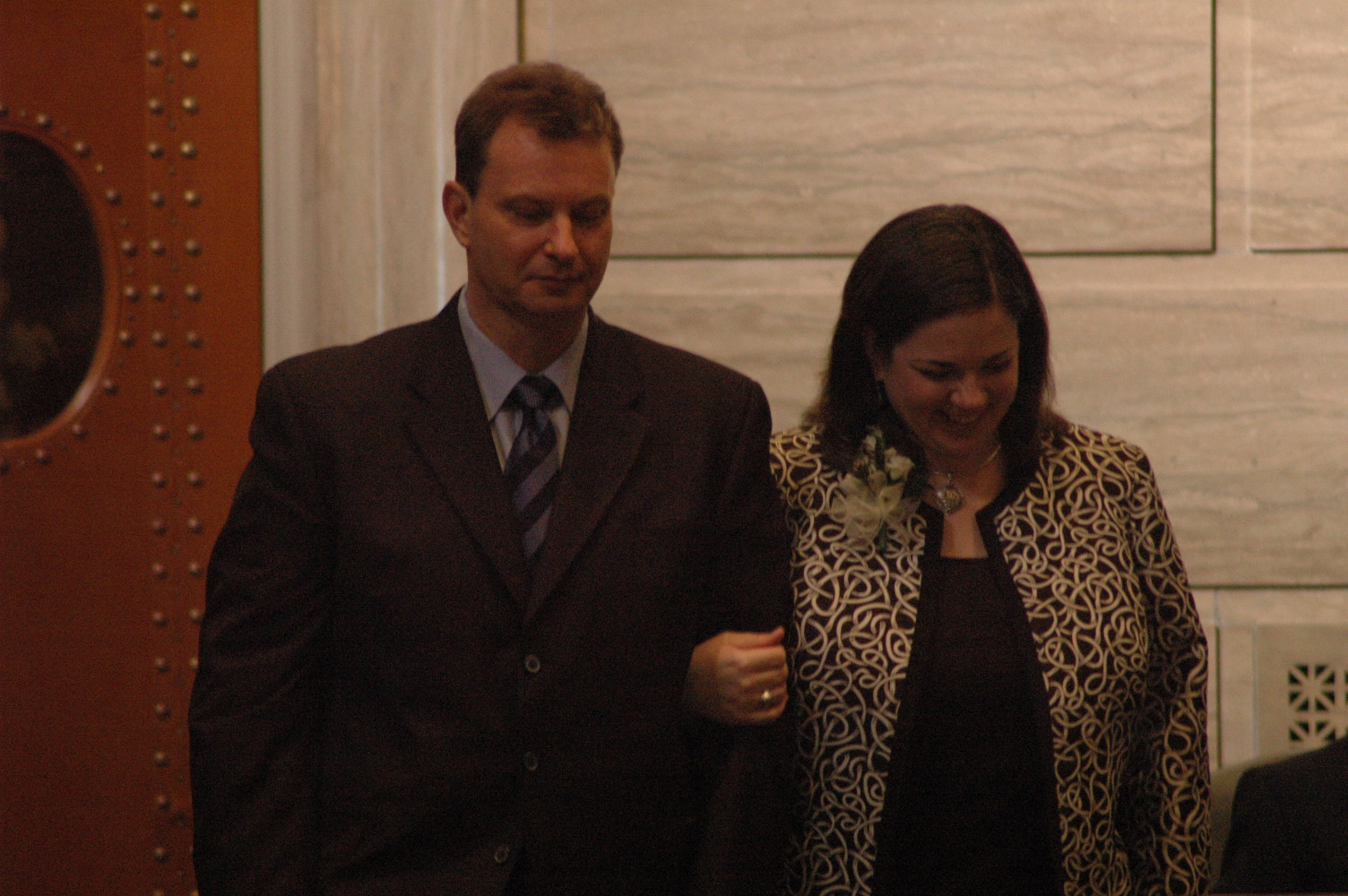

Member of the Missouri Senate from the 11th district
- In office 2003–2013
- Preceded by: Ronnie DePasco
- Succeeded by: Paul LeVota

Personal details
- Born: July 4, 1963 (age 63) Independence, Missouri
- Party: Democratic

Victor Callahan (born July 4, 1963, in Independence, Missouri) was a Democratic member of the Missouri Senate, representing the 11th District from 2003 to 2013.

In 1988, Victor Callahan was elected to the city council of Independence, Missouri, and continued to serve in that capacity until 1992. He then went on to serve as a legislative assistant to State Senator Ronnie DePasco. In November, 1994, Callahan was elected to represent the 1st District At-Large in the Jackson County, Missouri Legislature. At the end of September, 1996, he was elected by fellow legislators as Chairman of the Legislature, a position he held until January, 2003. Upon the death of Senator DePasco in late May 2003, Callahan ran for the then-vacant seat and was elected in a special election in November 2003, winning re-election in a regular election in November 2004.

In 2006 and 2007, Callahan spearheaded a move to annex seven schools from the Kansas City, Missouri School District into the Independence School District. Voters in both districts approved the measure in a special election on November 6, 2007. The schools in question were formally annexed on July 1, 2008 and re-opened as Independence schools on August 18, 2008.

The success of the measure boosted Senator Callahan's popularity in Jackson County, Missouri, also raising his profile in the statewide political arena, and he was unanimously elected as Floor Leader of Missouri State Senate Democrats, in a vote on November 6, 2008, two days after he was re-elected in the general election.

Senator Callahan served on the following committees:

- Administration
- Gubernatorial Appointments
- Jobs, Economic Development and Local Government
- Progress and Development, Chairman
- Small Business, Insurance and Industry
- Select Committee on Oversight of Federal Stimulus
- Joint Committee on Gaming and Wagering
- Joint Committee on Government Accountability
