= 2022 Jackson County Executive election =

- November 8, 2022

Nominee	Frank White	Theresa Cass Galvin
Party	Democratic	Republican
Popular vote	118,479	95,412
Percentage	55.23%	44.48%
County Executive before election
Frank White
Democratic
Elected County Executive
Frank White
Democratic

The 2022 Jackson Executive election took place on November 8, 2022. County Executive Frank White ran for re-election to a second full term. Owing to voter anger at property tax assessments, White faced a difficult campaign. He narrowly defeated attorney Stacy Lake in the Democratic primary, winning 53-47 percent, and then faced County Legislator Theresa Cass Galvin, the Republican nominee, in the general election. The Kansas City Star endorsed Galvin over White, critiquing White's tenure as "one of inattention and failure." White defeated Galvin by a wide margin, but reduced from previous elections, winning 55 percent of the vote to Galvin's 44 percent.

== Democratic primary ==
=== Candidates ===
- Frank White, incumbent County Executive
- Stacy Lake, attorney

=== Results ===
Democratic primary results
Party	Candidate	Votes	%
Democratic	Frank White (inc.)	34,007	53.27%
Democratic	Stacy Lake	29,836	46.73%
Total votes		63,843	100.00%

== Republican primary ==
=== Candidates ===
- Theresa Cass Galvin, County Legislator
- Preston Smith, member of the County Board of Equalization, participant in the January 6 United States Capitol attack
- Jason Pearson, county employee

=== Results ===
Republican primary results
Party	Candidate	Votes	%
Republican	Theresa Cass Galvin	16,790	43.67%
Republican	Preston Smith	12,283	31.95%
Republican	Jason Pearson	9,376	24.39%
Total votes		38,449	100.00%

== General election ==
=== Results ===
2022 Jackson County Executive election
Party	Candidate	Votes	%
Democratic	Frank White (inc.)	118,479	55.23%
Republican	Theresa Cass Galvin	95,412	44.48%
Write-in		621	0.29%
Total votes		214,512	100.00%
Democratic hold			
