= Katheryn Shields =

American politician (born 1946)

Katherine Shields

Member of the Kansas City, Missouri City Council
- Incumbent
- Assumed office August 1, 2015
- Preceded by: Jim Glover

County Executive of Jackson County, Missouri
- In office 1995–2007
- Preceded by: Marsha Murphy
- Succeeded by: Mike Sanders

Katheryn Shields (born October 24, 1946) is a Kansas City, Missouri Democratic Party politician who has served as the Kansas City councilwoman for the 4th district at-large since 2015. She previously served as Jackson County, Missouri County Executive from 1995 to 2006.

== Early life ==
Shields was born north of the Missouri River in Kansas City, attended Park Hill High School and graduated from North Kansas City High School in 1964.

At the University of Missouri - Kansas City, she received a Bachelor of Arts Degree in 1968, a master's degree in 1971, and a law degree in 1978.

After serving as an assistant Jackson County prosecutor in 1978 and 1979, she went into private practice.

== Political offices ==
She served on the Kansas City, Missouri City Council from 1987 until 1994, when she was elected county executive. While on the Council, she championed the 1% for Art Program and an ordinance to prohibit discrimination based on sexual orientation.

During her tenure as Jackson County Executive, the county launched a $20 million renovation of county buildings, including the Jackson County Courthouse and construction of a visitor center at Fort Osage, and negotiated an extension to keep the Kansas City Royals and Kansas City Chiefs at a renovated Truman Sports Complex through at least 2031. She instituted "green" policies that earned the county over two dozen environmental awards.

Shields was the area's highest ranking Democratic elected local official, and a prominent supporter of John Kerry in 2004.

As 2006 ended, Shields opted not to seek a fourth term as County Executive, but to run for Mayor of Kansas City in the 2007 Kansas City mayoral election.

In 2015, Shields narrowly defeated incumbent Kansas City councilman Jim Glover for re-election and was re-elected in 2019.

== 2007 court case ==
On January 6, 2007, the day before she was scheduled to file for Mayor of Kansas City (a race in which she was a frontrunner in the polls), she and her husband Phil Cardarella were indicted on federal charges of wire fraud in connection with the sale of their Sunset Hills house; prosecutors said the sale was at an inflated price. According to the alleged scheme Shields and her husband would receive $707,000 if they agreed to let an appraiser appraise it at $1.2 million with the appraiser and cohorts collecting the difference (the house had been on the market for $700,000) She claimed the charges were politically motivated by federal prosecutor Bradley Schlozman, who had been appointed by George W. Bush.

At trial, it came to light that neither Shields nor her husband had signed any documents that were not entirely truthful, that crucial documents had been forged, and that the FBI had instructed one appraiser to perform a false appraisal and told the loan company to approve a loan without verifying values on the false appraisal. Shields and Cardarella were found not guilty of all charges, although co-defendant appraiser and co-horts were convicted.

Thereafter, Shields—who had lost the race for Mayor—became Executive Director of Westside Housing Organization, a non-profit organization that built and ran low-income housing. In 2015, she ran for City Council and was narrowly elected over an incumbent councilmember. She was re-elected in 2019 and currently serves as Chair of the Finance Committee.

Political offices
Preceded by Marsha Murphy	Jackson County, Missouri County Executive; 1995-2006	Succeeded by Mike Sanders
