= Ronnie DePasco =

American politician

Ronnie DePasco (March 19, 1943 – May 24, 2003) was an American Democratic politician who served in the Missouri House of Representatives from 1977 until 1993 and the Missouri Senate from 1993 until his death in 2003.

DePasco attended Maple Woods Junior College and Rockhurst College. He died of lung cancer in 2003.
