= Mike Sanders (Missouri politician) =

American politician (born 1967)

Michael Sanders

County Executive of Jackson County, Missouri
- In office 2007–2015
- Preceded by: Katheryn Shields
- Succeeded by: Fred Arbanas (temporary), Frank White

Personal details
- Born: March 19, 1967 (age 59) Kansas City, Missouri, U.S.
- Education: University of Missouri-Kansas City (BA); Ohio State University (JD)

Military service
- Allegiance: United States
- Branch/service: United States Army
- Rank: First lieutenant

Michael David Sanders (born March 19, 1967) is a Democratic Party politician in Independence, Missouri, who served as Jackson County, Missouri Prosecuting Attorney from 2002 to 2006, Jackson County executive from 2007 to 2015, and Chairman of the Missouri Democratic Party from 2011 to 2013.

== Personal life and education ==
Michael David Sanders was born to parents Bruce David Sanders and Lynda Jean (Lamb) Sanders on March 19, 1967, in Kansas City, Missouri. His father retired from the United States Post Office after 38 years of service, promoted to the position of Tour Superintendent for downtown Kansas City, Missouri. Sanders' paternal grandfather, Archie David Sanders, served in the United States Army during World War II, stationed overseas as an airplane mechanic.

Raised in Gladstone, Missouri, Sanders received his primary kindergarten - 12 education at Big Shoal School (elementary; Kansas City, Missouri), Antioch Middle School (Gladstone, Missouri), and Winnetonka High School (Kansas City, Missouri). Sanders served in the Army ROTC during college. After earning a Bachelor of Arts degree in philosophy from the University of Missouri-Kansas City, Sanders attended law school at Ohio State University. After an initial semester at law school, Sanders took a leave of absence and volunteered for military service during the Gulf War. He was a commissioned officer in the United States Army, rising to the rank of first lieutenant. Upon completing military service, Sanders resumed his legal studies and earned a Juris Doctor from The Ohio State University - Moritz College of Law in 1994. Sanders and his wife Georgia Cardwell Sanders have two sons, John Michael and Patrick David.

== Career ==
Assistant Jackson County, Missouri Prosecuting Attorney

Sanders served as an assistant Jackson County, Missouri prosecuting attorney from 1994 to 1997. He served as a special prosecutor for the Jackson County Drug Task Force and was the lead attorney for D.A.R.T. (Drug Abatement Response Team). In 1995, Sanders received the Rookie Prosecutor of the Year award from the Jackson County Prosecutor's Office. That same year Mothers Against Drunk Driving (MADD) named him the Top Prosecutor of the Year for the state of Missouri. MADD's Heartland Chapter also presented him the Law Enforcement Officer of the Year award.

Jackson County, Missouri Prosecuting Attorney

In private practice until 2002, Sanders ran for and was elected Jackson County Prosecutor. He was re-elected for a second term in 2004.

Jackson County Executive

In 2006, Sanders was elected Jackson County Executive defeating Charles Wheeler. Sanders was re-elected to second and third terms 2010 and 2014.

Upon taking office in 2007, Sanders inherited a budget crisis of a $6.3 million shortfall in the County's General Fund — a deficit that threatened to shut down County operations. By overseeing cuts to the County budget each year, the County's finances were in order by the 2010 independent Jackson County Legislator audit.

In his first inaugural address, Sanders quoted President Harry S Truman: "America was not built on fear. America was built on courage, on imagination and an unbeatable determination to do the job at hand." During his tenure as County Executive, Sanders pushed through several key reforms and special projects including passage of Jackson County's first-ever comprehensive Code of Ethics, reorganization of the COMBAT program, opening of a new Regional Correctional Center, completion of renovations saving the Jackson County Historic Truman Courthouse, adoption of an updated county charter, and implementation of the Kansas City Streetcar - Ride KC public transportation system.

In 2008, Sanders was selected as one of just 24 elected officials from across the nation to be a fellow of the Aspen Institute-Rodel Fellowships in Public Leadership program. Founded in 1950, the Aspen Institute is an international nonprofit organization based in Washington, D.C.that fosters enlightened leadership and open-minded nonpartisan dialogue.

In 2015 after the loss of his father, Sanders resigned from office stating he wished to spend more time with his family and resume his legal career.

Missouri Democratic Party Chairman

Sanders served as the head of the Missouri Democratic Party from 2011 - 2013.

Criminal Charges

In January 2018, Sanders pleaded guilty to conspiracy to commit wire fraud in federal court.

Sanders served an 11 month, 6 day sentence in prison and paid a $17,000 fine.

Political offices
Preceded by Katheryn Shields	Jackson County, Missouri County Executive; 2007-2015	Succeeded by Fred Arbanas (temporary), Frank White
